= Inspector Hornleigh (film) =

1938 British film by Eugene Forde

- Directed by: Eugene Forde
- Written by: Bryan Edgar Wallace (Screenplay), Gerald Elliott (Dialogue), Richard Llewellyn
- Based on: The character 'Inspector Hornleigh' created by Hans Wolfgang Priwin
- Produced by: Robert Kane
- Starring: Gordon Harker; Alastair Sim
- Cinematography: Philip Tannura, Derick Williams
- Edited by: James B. Clark (Supervising Editor), Douglas Robertson (Film Editor)
- Production company: Twentieth Century Productions Ltd
- Distributed by: Twentieth Century Fox
- Release dates: 2 April 1939 (UK); 14 June 1939 (USA)
- Running time: 87 minutes
- Country: United Kingdom
- Language: English

Inspector Hornleigh is a 1938 British detective film directed by Eugene Forde, starring Gordon Harker and Alastair Sim, with Miki Hood, Wally Patch, Steven Geray, and Edward Underdown. It was written by Bryan Edgar Wallace, Gerald Elliott and Richard Llewellyn, and shot at Pinewood Studios.

== Plot ==
Inspector Hornleigh of Scotland Yard stumbles upon the theft of the Chancellor of the Exchequer's budget secrets, a crime which he ties to a murder he is investigating.

== Cast ==
- Gordon Harker as Inspector Hornleigh
- Alastair Sim as Sergeant Bingham
- Miki Hood as Ann Gordon
- Wally Patch as Sam Holt
- Steven Geray as Michael Kavanos
- Edward Underdown as Peter Dench
- Hugh Williams as Bill Gordon
- Gibb McLaughlin as Alfred Cooper
- Ronald Adam as Wittens
- Eliot Makeham as Alexander Parkinson, leather worker

== Production ==
The film was made by Twentieth Century Productions Ltd in October–November 1938 and released in April 1939.

It is a spin-off from a popular BBC radio series Inspector Hornleigh Investigates (1937–1940), created and written by Hans Wolfgang Priwin.

The screenplay was not written by Priwin and the leading characters are somewhat modified. The actor who played Inspector Hornleigh on the BBC, S.J. Warmington, is replaced by comedian Gordon Harker, and is given a bumbling sidekick, played by Alastair Sim.

The film was followed by two sequels written by Frank Launder and Sidney Gilliat: Inspector Hornleigh on Holiday (1939), and Inspector Hornleigh Goes To It (1940).

== Reception ==
The Monthly Film Bulletin wrote: "The story is far-fetched, and the surprise ending strains credulity still more, but it is well told, and the realistic atmosphere and succession of thrills should make it very popular. Gordon Harker is excellent as the Inspector and is ably supported by Alastair Sim as a comic sergeant. Among the more youthful parts, Hugh Williams is outsstandingly good as Bill, Ann's good-for-nothing brother."

Kine Weekly wrote: "It does not quite live up to its credentials, for it is a bit talkative and pedestrian. The difference between promise and fulfilment is not, however, wide enough seriously to impair popular appeal or pull."

The New York Times called the film "A neat bit of British detective fictionizing, as tailor-made as a Bond Street jacket".

TV Guide wrote: "Though the film is well-plotted and well-acted (Sim is hilarious), the thick English and Scottish accents were often incomprehensible to American audiences. Aside from that, the suspense is nicely built towards a good denouement".
