= 1961 in television =

The following television-related events took place during 1961.

== Events ==
- January 20 – John F. Kennedy is the first U.S. president to be inaugurated with a color telecast. NBC covers the inauguration in color.
- January 25
  - John F. Kennedy holds the first live televised presidential press conference.
  - Danger Man (United Kingdom) (1960–1961, 1964–1966) is cancelled due to lack of interest from Australian broadcasters. The series will be revived later.
- February 19 – CFTM-TV, future flagship station of Quebec's TVA network, begins broadcasting in Montreal.
- March 1 – Venevision officially renamed from Televisa of Venezuela.
- April 11 – The Eichmann trial is the first televised trial, shown on a one-day delay basis in the U.S. with videotape flown in daily from Jerusalem.
- April 24 – The world's television cameras record the Swedish warship Vasa break surface in Stockholm harbor as she is raised from the seabed for the first time since she sank on her maiden voyage in 1628.
- April 29
  - Westward Television, the first ITV franchise for South West England, begins broadcasting.
  - Wide World of Sports debuts on the American Broadcasting Company.
- May 5 – Alan B. Shepard is the first U.S. astronaut in space aboard the spacecraft Freedom 7 in a 15-min. suborbital flight. The launch is watched by 45 million U.S. viewers.
- May 9 – In a speech on "Television and the Public Interest" to the National Association of Broadcasters in the United States, Federal Communications Commission chairman Newton N. Minow describes commercial television programming as a "vast wasteland" and tells the broadcasters that they could do a better job of serving the public.
- May 29 – Dave Garroway announces his decision to quit the Today show on NBC in the United States.
- July 1 – The soap opera series The Brighter Day airs its first episode after taping locations are moved from New York City to Los Angeles. As a result, key character Babby Dennis and her love interest are written out of the series: the actors who played them didn't want to relocate.
- July 21 – Dicon Television Canal 11, as predecessor for Telefe, a major television network in Argentina, starts its first official regular broadcasting service from Buenos Aires.
- September 1 – Border Television, the ITV franchise for the English-Scottish Border and Isle of Man, begins broadcasting.
- September 21 – In France, the Organisation de l'armée secrète (OAS) slips an anti-de Gaulle message into TV programming.
- September 23 – NBC begins its long-running NBC Saturday Night at the Movies participating, with a broadcast of the 1953 Marilyn Monroe picture How to Marry a Millionaire.
- September 30 – Grampian Television, the ITV franchise for North East Scotland, begins broadcasting.
- October 1 – CTV Television Network (CTV) is launched in Canada, the first privately owned network in the country.
- October 29 – DZBB-TV Channel 7, the fourth television station in the Philippines owned by Republic Broadcasting System (modern-day GMA Network) of American war correspondent Robert "Uncle Bob" Stewart, is launched after the success of radio station DZBB.
- November 4 – Radiotelevisione italiana's second television channel, Rete 2 (later named Rai 2), first broadcasts to 52% of the available households in Italy.
- November 19 – Lucille Ball marries Gary Morton in New York City.
- December 15 – Sam and Friends broadcasts its last episode in the United States.
- December 31
  - Telefís Éireann (later known as RTÉ) starts television broadcasts, bringing television to Ireland for the first time.
  - KBS1, a major television station in South Korea, starts its first regular broadcasting service from Seoul.
  - WBNB airs the first television broadcast in the Virgin Islands. (The station would be destroyed by Hurricane Hugo in 1989.)
- Prudencia Grifell (born 1879 in Spain) makes the first of many Mexican telenovela appearances in Niebla.

== Debuts ==
- January 5 – Mister Ed on CBS (1961–1966)
- January 7 – The Avengers on ITV in UK (1961–1969)
- January 23 – The Americans on NBC
- January 30 – The Yogi Bear Show in syndication (1961-1962)
- February 27 – Acapulco on NBC (1961)
- March 17 – Five Star Jubilee on NBC
- April 3 – Minna no Uta on NHK
- Mat 26 – Inspector Hornleigh Intervenes on West Germany's WDR
- June 4 – Sportschau on ARD
- April 29 – ABC's Wide World of Sports (1961–2006)
- August 19 – Four Corners, Australia's first current affairs program (1961–present)
- September 9 – The Jo Stafford Show on ITV (1961)
- September 17 – Car 54, Where Are You? on NBC (1961–1963)
- September 26 – Ichabod and Me on CBS (1961-1962)
- September 27 – Top Cat on ABC (1961-1962)
- September 28 – Hazel on NBC (1961–1966)
- October 1 –
  - Bus Stop on ABC (1961–1962)
  - CTV National News (1961–present)
  - Songs of Praise on BBC (1961–present)
- October 2 –
  - Ben Casey on ABC (1961–1966)
  - Password on CBS (1961–1967)
  - Window on Main Street on CBS (1961–1962)
- October 3 – The Dick Van Dyke Show on CBS (1961–1966)
- October 4 –
  - The Alvin Show on CBS (1961–1962)
  - Playdate on CBC (Canada) (1961–1964)
- October 5
  - The Investigators (1961)
  - The New Bob Cummings Show (1961–1962)
- October 6 – Straightaway (1961–1962)
- October 7 – It's Academic (1961–present)
- October 30 – The News with Uncle Bob (1961-1972)
- November 8 – KVN (Клуб, Весёлых и Находчивых, Klub Vesyólykh i Nakhódchivykh, "Club of the Funny and Inventive") on The First Channel in the Soviet Union (1961–1972, 1986–present)
- November 13 – Camera Canada on CBC Television (1961-1963)
- December 11 – The Mike Douglas Show (1961–1981)
- December 31 – RTÉ News: Nine O'Clock on RTÉ One

== Programs/programmes ==
- Alfred Hitchcock Presents (1955–1962)
- American Bandstand (1952–1989)
- Armchair Theatre (UK) (1956–1968)
- As the World Turns (1956–2010)
- Blue Peter (UK) (1958–present)
- Bonanza (1959–1973)
- Bozo the Clown (1949–present)
- Bringing Up Buddy, 1960–1961
- Candid Camera (1948–present)
- Captain Kangaroo (1955–1984)
- Carols by Candlelight (1952–present)
- Cheyenne (1955–1962)
- Come Dancing (UK) (1949–1995)
- Coronation Street (UK) (1960–present)
- Danger Man (UK) (1960–1961, 1964–1966)
- Dixon of Dock Green (UK) (1955–1976)
- Face the Nation (1954–present)
- Grandstand (UK) (1958–2007)
- Gunsmoke (1955–1975)
- Hallmark Hall of Fame (1951–present)
- Hancock's Half Hour (1956–1962)
- Hato no kyujitsu (1953-2001)
- Hawaiian Eye (1959–1963)
- Inspector Hornleigh Intervenes (West Germany) (1961)
- Juke Box Jury (1959–1967, 1979, 1989–1990)
- Leave It to Beaver (1957–1963)
- Love of Life (1951–1980)
- Margie, 1961–1962
- Meet the Press (1947–present)
- My Three Sons (1960–1972)
- Dagsrevyen (1958–present)
- Opportunity Knocks (UK) (1956–1978)
- Panorama (UK) (1953–present)
- Rocky and His Friends (1959-1961) ends earlier in 1961 to resume later in 1961 on NBC as The Bullwinkle Show (1961–1964)
- Search for Tomorrow (1951–1986)
- The Adventures of Ozzie and Harriet (1952–1966)
- The Andy Griffith Show (1960–1968)
- The Alvin Show (1961-1962)
- The Bell Telephone Hour (1959–1968)
- The Bugs Bunny Show (1960-2000)
- The Donna Reed Show (1958–1966)
- The Ed Sullivan Show (1948–1971)
- The Edge of Night (1956–1984)
- The Flintstones (1960–1966)
- The Good Old Days (UK) (1953–1983)
- The Guiding Light (1952–2009)
- The Huckleberry Hound Show (1958–1962)
- The Jack Benny Show (1950–1965)
- The Lawrence Welk Show (1955–1982)
- The Milton Berle Show (1954–1967)
- The Price Is Right (1956–1965)
- The Quick Draw McGraw Show (1959–1962)
- The Secret Storm (1954–1974)
- The Sky at Night (UK) (1957–present)
- The Yogi Bear Show (1961-1962)
- The Today Show (1952–present)
- The Tonight Show (1954–present)
- The Twilight Zone (1959–1964, 1985–1989, 2002–2003)
- The Voice of Firestone (1949–1963)
- This Is Your Life (UK) (1955–2003)
- Top Cat (1961-1962)
- Truth or Consequences (1950–1988)
- Walt Disney Presents (1958–1961) ends on September 17 to resume on September 24 on NBC as Walt Disney's Wonderful World of Color (1961–1969)
- What the Papers Say (UK) (1956–2008)
- What's My Line (1950–1967)
- WIN News (1960–present)
- Window on Main Street (1961–1962)
- Zoo Quest (UK) (1954–1964)

== Ending this year ==
Date	Show	Debut
January 1	General Motors Presents (Can)	1958
January 6	Dan Raven	1960
February 13	Klondike	1960
April 7	Happy	1960
April 12	My Sister Eileen	1960
April 24	Acapulco	1961
April 30	The Tab Hunter Show	1960
May 15	The Americans	1961
May 23	The Tom Ewell Show	1960
May 31	Peter Loves Mary	1960
June 20	The Army Game (UK)	1957
June 27	Stagecoach West	1960
June 29	The Ford Show	1956
June 30	Hancock's Half Hour	1956
July 3	Bringing Up Buddy	1960
September 18	Peter Gunn	1958
September 22	Five Star Jubilee	1961
December 1	The Huckleberry Hound Show	1958
December 2	Deadline Midnight	1960
December 15	Sam and Friends	1955
December 28	The Investigators	1961
Unknown	This Is Your Life (US)	1952

== Changes of network affiliation ==
Show	Moved from	Moved to
Walt Disney Presents	ABC	NBC
The Detectives	ABC	NBC
Rocky and His Friends	ABC	NBC
The Wonderful World of Disney	ABC	NBC
Bachelor Father	NBC	ABC
Mister Ed	Syndication	CBS

== Births ==
Date	Name	Notability
January 2	Gabrielle Carteris	Actress (Beverly Hills, 90210)
January 4	Graham McTavish	Actor
January 7	Jeff Richmond	Actor
January 9	Candi Milo	Actress (Swat Kats: The Radical Squadron, Dexter's Laboratory, ChalkZone, The Adventures of Jimmy Neutron, Boy Genius, ¡Mucha Lucha!, My Life as a Teenage Robot, Foster's Home for Imaginary Friends, Maya & Miguel, The Life and Times of Juniper Lee, The Replacements)
January 9	Al Jean	Writer
January 10	Evan Handler	Actor
January 13	Julia Louis-Dreyfus	Actress (Seinfeld, Veep)
January 19	Paul McCrane	Actor (ER)
January 19	Mark Roberts	TV producer
January 26	Sharyl Attkisson	American journalist
January 31	Oren Koules	Film producer
February 2	Lauren Lane	Actress (The Nanny)
February 5	Tim Meadows	Actor (Saturday Night Live)
February 5	Bruce Timm	Producer and animator (DC Animated Universe, Green Lantern: The Animated Series, Freakazoid!)
February 9	Clayton Townsend	TV producer
February 10	George Stephanopoulos	TV host
February 10	Jay Pickett	Actor (died 2021)
February 18	Alison Owen	English film producer
February 21	Christopher Atkins	Actor (Dallas)
February 23	Trent Lehman	Actor (Nanny and the Professor) (died 1982)
February 24	Kasi Lemmons	Actress
February 27	Grant Shaud	Actor (Murphy Brown)
February 27	James Worthy	NBA basketball player
March 3	Mary Page Keller	Actress (Duet)
March 4	Steven Weber	Actor (Wings, Once and Again)
March 8	Camryn Manheim	Actress (The Practice, Ghost Whisperer, Person of Interest)
March 11	Elias Koteas	Actor
March 14	Penny Johnson Jerald	Actress
March 17	Casey Siemaszko	Actor (NYPD Blue)
March 18	Geoffrey Owens	Actor (The Cosby Show)
March 21	Kassie DePaiva	Actress (One Life to Live)
March 26	Billy Warlock	Actor (Baywatch)
March 28	Byron Scott	NBA basketball player and coach
April 2	Christopher Meloni	Actor (NYPD Blue, Oz, Law & Order: Special Victims Unit)
April 3	Eddie Murphy	Comedian, actor (Saturday Night Live)
April 6	Gene Eugene	Singer (Adam Again), actor (The Amazing Chan and the Chan Clan) (died 2000)
April 7	Teri Ann Linn	Actress, singer (The Bold and the Beautiful)
April 10	Nicky Campbell	Scottish television presenter
April 14	Robert Carlyle	Scottish actor (Stargate Universe, Once Upon a Time)
April 17	Carlo Rota	Canadian actor (24)
April 18	Jane Leeves	English actress (Daphne Moon on Frasier)
April 19	Alan Kirschenbaum	Writer (died 2012)
April 21	Cathy Cavadini	Voice actress (Blossom on The Powerpuff Girls)
April 22	Byron Allen	Producer
April 23	Dirk Bach	Comedian, actor and TV host (died 2012)
April 23	Þröstur Leó Gunnarsson	Actor
April 23	George Lopez	Comedian, actor (George Lopez)
April 29	Stacey Snider	American film industry executive
April 30	Isiah Thomas	NBA basketball player and TV commentator
May 1	Marilyn Milian	Judge
May 3	Joe Murray	Animator and voice actor (Rocko's Modern Life, Camp Lazlo)
May 4	Mary Elizabeth McDonough	Actress (The Waltons)
May 6	George Clooney	Actor (ER)
May 6	Wally Wingert	Actor
May 6	Gina Riley	Actress, comedian (Fast Forward)
May 9	John Corbett	Actor (Northern Exposure, Sex and the City)
May 12	Lar Park Lincoln	Actress (Knots Landing)
May 13	Dennis Rodman	NBA basketball player
May 14	Tim Roth	Actor
May 15	Giselle Fernández	American television journalist
May 16	Kevin McDonald	Actor (The Kids in the Hall, Lilo & Stitch: The Series, Catscratch)
May 22	Jeremy Gelbwaks	Actor (The Partridge Family)
May 27	Peri Gilpin	Actress (Frasier, Make It or Break It)
May 27	Cathy Silvers	Actress (Happy Days)
May 29	Melissa Etheridge	Singer, voice actress
May 29	Linda Wallem	Actress (Rocko's Modern Life, Nurse Jackie)
May 30	Ralph Carter	Actor (Michael Evans on Good Times)
May 31	Lea Thompson	Actress (Caroline in the City)
June 1	Mark Curry	Actor (Hangin' with Mr. Cooper)
June 1	Aaron Sorkin	Screenwriter
June 5	Mary Kay Bergman	Voice actress (Every female character on South Park seasons 1–3) (died 1999)
June 6	Wes Johnson	Actor
June 9	Michael J. Fox	Actor (Alex P. Keaton on Family Ties)
June 15	Jim Hanks	Actor
June 24	Iain Glen	Actor
June 25	Ricky Gervais	English actor and comedian (The Office)
June 29	Kimberlin Brown	Actress (The Young and the Restless, The Bold and the Beautiful)
June 29	Sharon Lawrence	Actress (NYPD Blue)
July 1	Diana, Princess of Wales	Member of the British royal family (died 1997)
July 1	Carl Lewis	Track and field athlete
July 1	Dominic Keating	English actor (Star Trek: Enterprise)
July 9	Raymond Cruz	Actor
July 15	Forest Whitaker	Actor
July 18	Elizabeth McGovern	Actress (Downton Abbey)
July 19	Pat Gibson	Irish quizzer
July 19	Campbell Scott	Actor
July 21	Kym Whitley	Actress and comedian (My Brother and Me, College Road Trip)
July 22	Calvin Fish	English-born sports commentator, previously racing driver
July 22	Keith Sweat	Singer
July 23	Woody Harrelson	Actor (Woody Boyd on Cheers)
July 23	David Kaufman	Voice actor (Freakazoid!, Danny Phantom, Superman: The Animated Series, The Buzz on Maggie)
July 25	Bobbie Eakes	Actress and singer (The Bold and the Beautiful, One Life to Live)
July 25	Katherine Kelly Lang	Actress (The Bold and the Beautiful)
July 27	Janet Tamaro	Writer
July 27	E. D. Hill	American journalist
July 30	Laurence Fishburne	Actor (CSI: Crime Scene Investigation, Black-ish)
August 4	Barack Obama	Politician and 44th president of the United States
August 4	Lauren Tom	American actress (Pepper Ann, Futurama, Rocket Power, Teacher's Pet, Kim Possible, Fillmore!, Codename: Kids Next Door, Teen Titans, American Dragon: Jake Long, The Replacements)
August 4	Michael Gelman	American executive producer of Live with Kelly and Ryan
August 5	Janet McTeer	English actress
August 7	Maggie Wheeler	American actress
August 7	Brian Conley	English actor
August 13	Dawnn Lewis	American actress (A Different World, Hangin' with Mr. Cooper)
August 13	Sam Champion	American weather anchor
August 14	Susan Olsen	Actress (Cindy on The Brady Bunch)
August 18	Bob Woodruff	American television journalist
August 20	Joe Pasquale	English actor
August 20	Asha Blake	Actor
August 21	Stephen Hillenburg	American creator of SpongeBob SquarePants (died 2018)
August 24	Jared Harris	English actor (Mad Men, Fringe, The Expanse)
August 25	Billy Ray Cyrus	American singer and actor (Hannah Montana)
August 25	Ally Walker	American actress (Santa Barbara, Profiler)
August 25	Joanne Whalley	English actress
August 26	Kari Lizer	American actress
August 27	Mark Curry	English presenter
August 28	Jennifer Coolidge	American actress
August 29	Artur Zheji	Albanian television host (died 2025)
September 1	Eugenio Derbez	Actor
September 6	Bruce W. Smith	Producer
September 11	Elizabeth Daily	Voice actress (Rugrats, The Powerpuff Girls, ChalkZone)
September 15	Dan Marino	NFL football player and analyst (The NFL Today)
September 15	Colin McFarlane	Actor, voice actor and narrator (Outlander, Doctor Who)
September 15	Noel MacNeal	Actor
September 16	Jen Tolley	Actress
September 21	Nancy Travis	Actress (Last Man Standing)
September 22	Bonnie Hunt	Actress, comedian (The Bonnie Hunt Show)
September 22	Catherine Oxenberg	Actress
September 23	Chi McBride	Actor (The John Larroquette Show, Boston Public)
September 24	Allen Bestwick	American sportscaster
September 25	Heather Locklear	Actress (Melrose Place)
September 27	Andy Lau	Actor
September 28	Gregory Jbara	Actor
September 30	Crystal Bernard	Actress (Wings)
September 30	Erica Ehm	TV host and VJ (MuchMusic)
September 30	Eric Stoltz	Actor
October 3	Marcus Giamatti	Actor (Judging Amy)
October 4	David W. Harper	Actor (The Waltons)
October 4	Kazuki Takahashi	Manga creator (Yu-Gi-Oh!, Yu-Gi-Oh! GX, Yu-Gi-Oh! 5D's, Yu-Gi-Oh! Zexal) (died 2022)
October 8	Simon Burke	Actor (Devil's Playground)
October 9	Ellen Wheeler	Actress (Another World, All My Children)
October 13	Doc Rivers	NBA basketball player and coach
October 16	Kim Wayans	Actress, comedian (In Living Color)
October 25	Chad Smith	American musician
October 26	Dylan McDermott	Actor (The Practice)
October 30	Larry Wilmore	Actor
November 3	Kari Michaelsen	Actress (Gimme a Break!)
November 4	Jeff Probst	Host (Survivor)
November 4	Ralph Macchio	Actor
November 8	Leif Garrett	Actor
November 9	Lisa McRee	News anchor
November 11	Luca Zingaretti	Italian actor (Inspector Montalbano)
November 14	Elizabeth Keifer	Actress (Guiding Light)
November 19	Meg Ryan	Actress (As the World Turns)
November 22	Gary Valentine	Actor and comedian (The King of Queens)
November 22	Mariel Hemingway	Actress
November 26	Marcy Walker	Soap opera actress
November 28	Martin Clunes	English actor and comedian (Doc Martin)
November 29	Kim Delaney	Actress (NYPD Blue)
December 1	Jeremy Northam	Actor
December 2	Gaby Köster	Actress, comedian
December 8	Mikey Robins	Australian media personality
December 9	Joe Lando	Actor (Dr. Quinn, Medicine Woman)
December 9	David Anthony Higgins	Actor (Malcolm in the Middle)
December 13	Karen Witter	Actress
December 16	Jon Tenney	Actor
December 16	Bill Hicks	Comedian (died 1994)
December 23	Carol Smillie	Scottish television presenter
December 24	Eriko Kitagawa	Screenwriter (Aishiteiru to Itte Kure)
December 24	Wade Williams	Actor (Prison Break)
December 30	Sean Hannity	Talk show host (Hannity)
December 31	Joanna Johnson	Actress (The Bold and the Beautiful)

== Deaths ==
Date	Name	Age	Notability
February 3	Anna May Wong	56	American actress
May 22	Joan Davis	53	Actress (I Married Joan)
August 26	Gail Russell	36	American actress
August 30	Charles Coburn	84	Actor
September 10	Leo Carrillo	80	Actor (The Cisco Kid)
October 11	Chico Marx	74	Actor (member of the Marx Brothers)
November 24	Ruth Chatterton	68	Actress

== Television debuts ==
- James Brolin – Follow the Sun
- James Caan – Route 66
- John Davis Chandler – The Asphalt Jungle
- Julie Christie – A for Andromeda
- Dabney Coleman – Naked City
- Samantha Eggar – Rob Roy
- Jane Fonda – A String of Beads
- Gene Hackman – Tallahassee 7000
- Dustin Hoffman – Naked City
- John Hurt – Probation Officer
- Derek Jacobi – BBC Sunday-Night Play
- Tim Matheson – Window on Main Street
- Sarah Miles – Deadline Midnight
- Millie Perkins – Wagon Train
- Rob Reiner – Manhunt
- Andy Romano – Alfred Hitchcock Presents
- W. Morgan Sheppard – Theatre Night
- Glynn Turman – Play of the Week
- Gene Wilder – Play of the Week

== See also ==
- 1961–62 United States network television schedule
