= Persons Unknown =

Persons Unknown may refer to:

- Persons Unknown (play), a 1929 play by Edgar Wallace
- Persons Unknown (1958 film), Italian comedy a/k/a Big Deal on Madonna Street
- "Persons Unknown", 1967 episode of British TV series Dr. Finlay's Casebook
- "Persons Unknown" (song), 1980 release by English anarcho-punk band Poison Girls#Singles
- Persons Unknown, 1996 American crime thriller directed by George Hickenlooper#Narrative films
- Persons Unknown (TV series), 2010 American miniseries
