= Betty Jardine =

English actress (1903–1945)

- Born: 17 April 1903; Stockport, Cheshire, England
- Died: 28 February 1945 (aged 41); Bournemouth, Hampshire, England
- Occupation: Actress
- Years active: 1926–1944 (film and theatre)

Betty Jardine (17 April 1903 – 28 February 1945) was a British stage and film actress.

She began as an actress in Manchester in 1926. In 1934, she made her West End debut in Disharmony at the Fortune Theatre. Subsequent roles were in the Emlyn Williams plays Night Must Fall in 1935 and The Corn Is Green in 1938.

Jardine was married to the psychoanalyst Wilfred Bion with whom she had a daughter, Parthenope. Jardine died a few days after the birth, from a pulmonary embolism.

== Filmography ==
Year	Title	Role	Notes
1937	Oh, Mr Porter!	Secretary	Uncredited
1938	Almost a Honeymoon	Lavinia Pepper	
1938	Badger's Green	Unknown	TV movie
1938	Nine Till Six	Unknown	TV movie
1939	Sun Up	Emmy	TV movie
1939	Inspector Hornleigh on Holiday	Alfred's Girlfriend	Uncredited
1940	The Girl in the News	Elsie	
1940	Night Train to Munich	Girl Singing on Stage	Uncredited
1941	The Ghost Train	Edna	
1941	Kipps	Doris	
1941	Inspector Hornleigh Goes To It	Daisy	
1942	We Serve	Private Dickson	Short film
1943	We'll Meet Again	Miss Bohne	
1943	Rhythm Serenade	Helen	
1944	A Canterbury Tale	Fee Baker	
1944	Two Thousand Women	Teresa King	(final film role)

== Bibliography ==
- Gomez, Lavinia. Developments in Object Relations: Controversies, Conflicts, and Common Ground. Taylor & Francis, 2017.
- Wearing, J.P. The London Stage 1930-1939: A Calendar of Productions, Performers, and Personnel. Rowman & Littlefield, 2014.
