= Inspector Hornleigh on Holiday =

1939 film by Walter Forde

- Directed by: Walter Forde
- Written by: Sidney Gilliat; Frank Launder; J.O.C. Orton
- Produced by: Edward Black
- Starring: Gordon Harker; Alastair Sim; Linden Travers
- Cinematography: Jack E. Cox
- Edited by: R.E. Dearing
- Production company: 20th Century-Fox
- Distributed by: 20th Century-Fox
- Release dates: 4 October 1939 (United Kingdom); 1 December 1939 (United States)
- Running time: 90 minutes
- Country: United Kingdom
- Language: English

Inspector Hornleigh on Holiday is a 1939 British detective film directed by Walter Forde and starring Gordon Harker, Alastair Sim and Linden Travers. It is the sequel to the 1938 film Inspector Hornleigh, and both films are based on the novels by Leo Grex. A third and final film, Inspector Hornleigh Goes To It, followed in 1941.

== Plot summary ==
During a holiday by the British seaside, Inspector Hornleigh and Sergeant Bingham grow bored and turn their hand to investigating a local crime.

== Cast ==
- Gordon Harker as Inspector Hornleigh
- Alastair Sim as Sergeant Bingham
- Linden Travers as Miss Angela Meadows
- Wally Patch as Police Sergeant
- Edward Chapman as Captain Edwin Fraser
- Philip Leaver as Bradfield
- Kynaston Reeves as Dr. Manners
- John Turnbull as Chief Constable
- Wyndham Goldie as Sir George Winbeck
