= White Face =

1932 film

- Directed by: T. Hayes Hunter
- Written by: Angus MacPhail (scenario); Bryan Edgar Wallace (adaptation)
- Based on: play Persons Unknown by Edgar Wallace
- Produced by: Michael Balcon
- Starring: Hugh Williams; Gordon Harker; Renee Gadd
- Cinematography: Alex Bryce; Bernard Knowles
- Music by: Louis Levy
- Production companies: British Lion Film Corporation; Gainsborough Pictures
- Distributed by: Woolf & Freedman Film Service (UK)
- Release date: May 1932 (London)
- Running time: 70 minutes
- Country: United Kingdom
- Language: English

White Face (also known as Edgar Wallace's White Face the Fiend) is a lost 1932 British crime film directed by T. Hayes Hunter and starring Hugh Williams, Gordon Harker and Renee Gadd. It was written by Angus MacPhail and Bryan Edgar Wallace based on the 1929 play Persons Unknown by Edgar Wallace.

== Plot ==
A doctor becomes a blackmailer and a jewel thief in order to raise funds for a hospital in East London but is uncovered by an ambitious reporter.

== Cast ==
- Hugh Williams as Michael Seeley
- Gordon Harker as Sam Hackett
- Norman McKinnel as Inspector Mason
- Renee Gadd as Janice Harman
- Richard Bird as Donald Bateman
- Nora Swinburne as Inez Landor
- Leslie Perrins as Louis Landor
- J.H. Roberts as Doctor Marford
- D. A. Clarke-Smith as Dr. Rudd
- Gibb McLaughlin as Sgt. Elk
- Jeanne Stuart as Gloria Gaye
- Clare Greet aa Mrs. Albert

== Preservation status ==
The film is considered a lost film, but the screenplay still exists. The British Film Institute National Archive holds a collection of stills, but no video or film materials.

== Critical reception ==
The Daily Film Renter wrote: "Intriguing murder mystery melodrama in the ingenious Wallace vein. ... Tense drama, Cockney comedy and finely conceived situations blended expertly by Director T. Hayes Hunter into a really holding and entertaining film. Norman McKinnel as detective-inspector and Gordon Harker as wisecracking pickpocket take acting honours with magnificent portrayals. Photography and settings a high standard. Sure top-line booking with all halls."

The New York Times wrote, "The British studios contribute a well-bred little mystery picture to the Broadway market in White Face, which is at the Broadway Theatre. An Edgar Wallace product, tailor-made according to the formula for these matters, it places a corpse in a slummy London street at midnight, sets the hounds of Scotland Yard baying up several wrong trees, and in good time whips the mask off the mysterious White Face. On Hollywood standards it is a pleasant enough item for the homicide enthusiasts, suffering generally from a faintly anemic quality and specifically from an absence of humor."

Variety wrote: "Third picture imported from London and dubbed here by Helber with American voices, on the theory that it will be easier to book where the accent is more familiar. Good in theory, perhaps, but not working out in practice. This was dubbed by Jay Kemp, who made a better job than on the second release, but it remains a question whether the picture would not have fared better with the original voices. Easy to dub English into English, since the lip movements are the same, but it seems to be impossible to get naturalness. The lip movements of the players suggest different intonations than the voices heard and the result is unnatural and far from pleasing. This story, done from an Edgar Wallace yarn, is well plotted and well staged. A little too much talking, but still a fair proportion of movement. Story moves logically to its denouement and then speeds up. Some good characterization and fair amount of comedy, though much of the comedy is spoiled through a voice which does not fit the screen character. Gordon Harker handles the comedy well as a Cockney character, with good performances turned in by Renee Gadd, Jeanne Stuart, Norah Swinburne, Norman McKinnel and Richard Bird."

== Bibliography ==
- Sweet, Matthew. Shepperton Babylon: The Lost Worlds of British Cinema (Faber and Faber, 2005)
