= Niebla =

Niebla, a Spanish word (from Latin nebula, also meaning) "mist, fog", may refer to:

== Places and jurisdiction ==
- Niebla, Spain, a town, former bishopric and titular see in Andalusia, southern Spain
  - Taifa of Niebla, a medieval Moorish 'taifa' kingdom on the Iberian peninsula
- Niebla, Chile, a coastal town in the municipality of Valdivia

== People ==
- Mr. Niebla (1973–2019), Mexican masked wrestler
- Eduardo Niebla (born 1955), Spanish guitarist
- Ruben Niebla (born 1971), baseball player from California

== Other ==
- Niebla (dinosaur), a genus
- Niebla (lichen), a genus
- Niebla (novel), a novel by Miguel de Unamuno, published 1914
- Niebla (telenovela), Mexican telenovela
