= Jean Kent =

English actress (1921–2013)

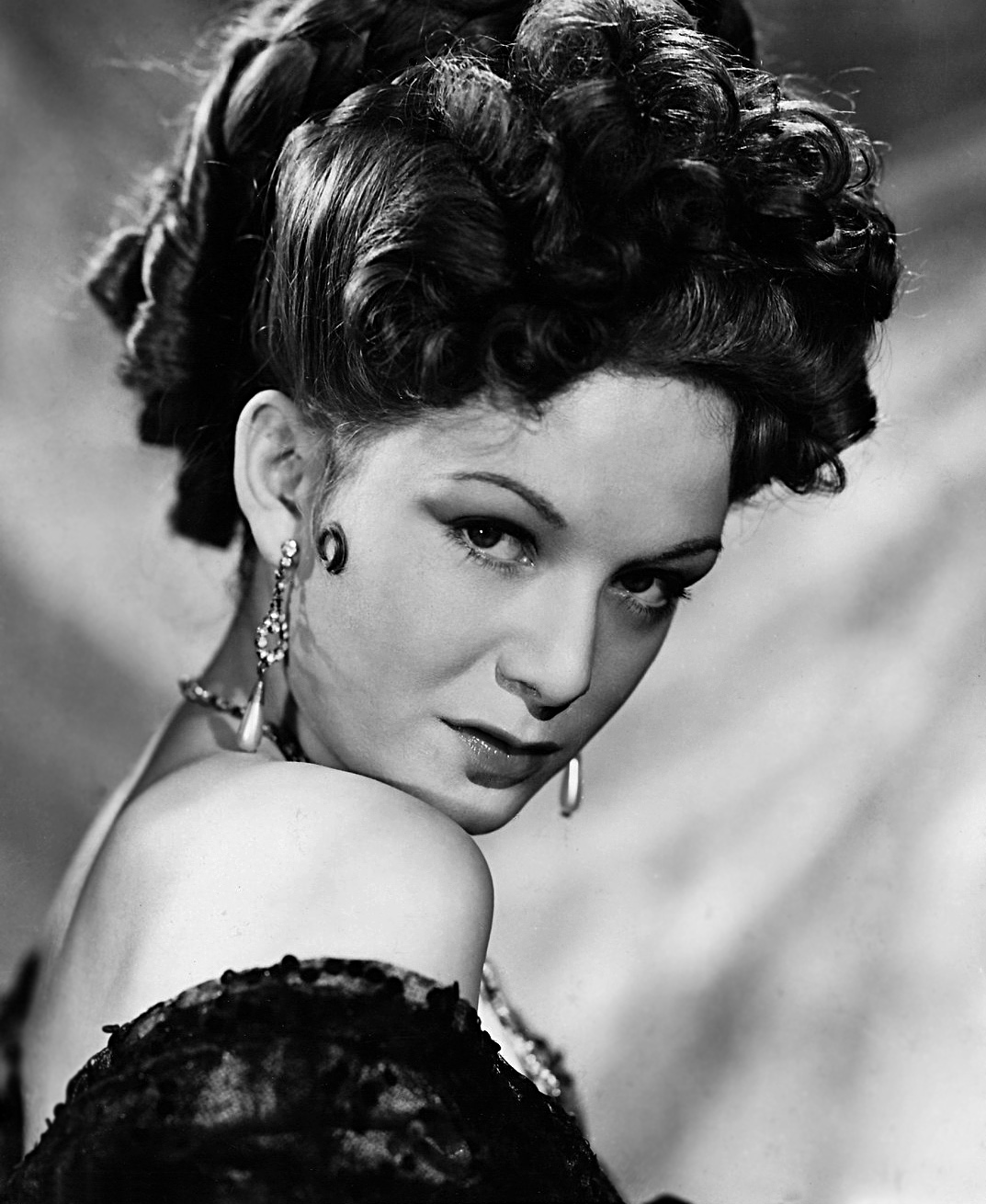
- Kent in 1947
- Born: Joan Mildred Field; 29 June 1921; Brixton, London, England
- Died: 30 November 2013 (aged 92); Bury St Edmunds, Suffolk, England
- Occupation: Actress
- Years active: 1935–1991
- Spouse: Josef Ramart (m. 1946; died 1989)

Jean Kent (born Joan Mildred Field; 29 June 1921 − 30 November 2013) was an English film and television actress.

== Biography ==
Kent was born Joan Mildred Field (sometimes incorrectly cited as Summerfield) in Brixton, London, in 1921, the only child of variety performers Norman Carpenter Summerfield, who used the name "Norman Field", and Mildred Lilian (née Noaks), known as "Nina Norre". She started her theatrical career at age 10 in 1931 as a dancer. She used the stage name Jean Carr when she appeared as a chorus girl in the Windmill Theatre in London, from which she was fired by Vivian Van Damm.

=== Gainsborough Pictures ===
Kent signed to Gainsborough Pictures during the Second World War. She had small roles in It's That Man Again (1943), Miss London Ltd. (1943) and Warn That Man (1944). Kent appeared in Two Thousand Women (1944), playing a stripper who is interned by the Germans. She portrayed a Pacific Islander in Bees in Paradise (1944) with Arthur Askey and the ingenue in a Tommy Trinder musical Champagne Charlie (1944).

The turning point in her career came when she was given a dramatic part in the Gainsborough melodrama film Fanny by Gaslight (1944). She played a part turned down by Margaret Lockwood, that of the childhood friend of the character played by Phyllis Calvert, who becomes the mistress of James Mason's character. The movie, also starring Stewart Granger, was a box-office success in Britain and established Kent as Gainsborough's back up to Margaret Lockwood.

Kent played another sexually aggressive young woman in Madonna of the Seven Moons (1945), another financial success, with Calvert and Granger. Rank borrowed her to support Rex Harrison in The Rake's Progress (1945), after which she returned to Gainsborough, appearing in Waterloo Road (1945) with John Mills and Granger.

=== Stardom ===
Kent shared top billing with Granger in Caravan (1946), playing a gypsy girl in another melodrama. It was a financial success and Kent was given a new contract. Granger and Kent were reunited in The Magic Bow (1946), with Kent again taking a part originally meant for Margaret Lockwood.

"There was a pecking order at Gainsborough," Kent later recalled. "First Margaret, then Pat, then Phyllis, then me. I was the odds-and-sods girl. I used to mop up the parts that other people didn't want."

After a support role in Carnival (1946) with Michael Wilding, Kent was the female lead in The Man Within (1947), a costume adventure from a novel by Graham Greene. Kent had a good part in The Loves of Joanna Godden (1947), and was given a star role in Good-Time Girl (1948), a melodrama about a girl who goes bad. Kent was top billed as one of several names in Bond Street (1948), and was the female lead in a thriller Sleeping Car to Trieste (1948), playing a spy.

Kent appeared as the lead in a musical Trottie True (1949), which became her favourite film. She made a comedy in Italy, Her Favourite Husband (1950), and appeared opposite Dirk Bogarde in The Woman in Question (1950). In 1950, Kent was voted the 9th biggest British star in Britain; the following year she moved up to 8th. Kent starred in the melodrama The Reluctant Widow (1951) then had a good role as the unfaithful wife in The Browning Version (1951).

Kent was in a thriller The Lost Hours (1952) with American actor Mark Stevens and Before I Wake (1955). She appeared in Arthur Watkyn's historical play The Moonraker in 1952, and in 1953 was in a play Uncertain Joy. That year she appeared on a TV play with Michael Craig, who said she "was on the wane after a successful career as a film star. She didn't like slumming it in television at all and was very grand and one scary lady."

In 1954, Kent fell ill while touring in a stage production of The Deep Blue Sea in South Africa.

=== Later career ===
Kent's film appearances grew less frequent from the mid-1950s onward. She had supporting roles in The Prince and the Showgirl (1957), Bonjour Tristesse (1958), and the horror film The Haunted Strangler (1959). She was in the comedy Please Turn Over (1959) and the thriller Beyond This Place (1959). She was one of several female stars in Bluebeard's Ten Honeymoons (1960) with George Sanders.

She played Queen Elizabeth I in the historical TV adventure series Sir Francis Drake filmed in 1961–62.

In 1981, she played Jennifer Lamont in the soap opera Crossroads.

== Personal life ==
Kent was married to Austrian actor Josef Ramart from 1946 until his death in 1989, aged 70. They met on the set of Caravan, in which both appeared. Actor Stewart Granger, a co-star in the picture, was the best man at their wedding. Kent and Ramart also both had roles in the film Trottie True.

Kent was the subject of This Is Your Life in 1974, being surprised by Eamonn Andrews at the Strand Theatre. Kent made her last public appearance in June 2011, when she was honoured by the British Film Institute on her 90th birthday. She was a guest at a screening of Caravan at the BFI Southbank.

== Death ==
Kent died in the West Suffolk Hospital, Bury St. Edmunds, on 30 November 2013, following a fall at her home in Westhorpe. The coroner determined that Kent died from accidental injuries received during a fall that may have been caused by cardiac disease.

== Filmography ==
=== Film ===
Year	Title	Role	Notes
1935	The Rocks of Valpre		Credited as Joan Summerfield
1935	Who's Your Father	Mary Radcliffe	
1939	A Ship in the Bay	Iris	Credited as Jean Carr
1943	It's That Man Again	Kitty	
1943	Warn That Man	Frances Lane	
1943	Miss London Ltd.	The Encyclopaedia Girl	
1944	Bees in Paradise	Jani	
1944	Fanny by Gaslight	Lucy Beckett	AKA, Man of Evil
1944	Champagne Charlie	Dolly Bellwood	
1944	Two Thousand Women	Bridie Johnson	
1945	Madonna of the Seven Moons	Vittoria	
1945	Waterloo Road	Toni	
1945	The Wicked Lady	Captain Jerry Jackson's doxy	
1945	The Rake's Progress	Jill Duncan	AKA, Notorious Gentleman
1946	Caravan	Rosal	
1946	The Magic Bow	Bianca	
1946	Carnival	Irene Dale	
1947	The Man Within	Lucy	AKA, The Smugglers
1947	The Loves of Joanna Godden	Ellen Godden	
1948	Good-Time Girl	Gwen Rawlings	
1948	Bond Street	Ricki Merritt	
1948	Sleeping Car to Trieste	Valya	
1949	Trottie True	Trottie True	AKA, The Gay Lady
1950	The Reluctant Widow	Helena	
1950	Her Favourite Husband	Dorothy Pellegrini	AKA, The Taming of Dorothy
1950	The Woman in Question	Agnes / Astra	AKA, Five Angles on Murder
1951	The Browning Version	Millie Crocker-Harris	
1952	The Lost Hours	Louise Parker	AKA, The Big Frame
1955	Before I Wake	Florence Haddon	AKA, Shadow of Fear
1957	The Prince and the Showgirl	Maisie Springfield	
1958	Bonjour Tristesse	Helen Lombard	
1958	The Haunted Strangler	Cora Seth	
1959	Beyond This Place	Louise Burt	AKA, Web of Evidence
1959	Please Turn Over	Janet Halliday	
1960	Bluebeard's Ten Honeymoons	Julienne Guillin	
1976	Shout at the Devil	Mrs. Smythe	

=== Television ===
Year	Title	Role	Notes
1947	Cinderella	Prince Charming	TV miniseries
1949	Big Ben	Grace Green	TV film
1955	London Playhouse	Elsa Carter	Episode: "A Call on the Widow"
1956	Theatre Royal	Ada Weston	Episode: "The Lovebirds"
1956	Pantomania, or Dick Whittington	Dick Whittington	TV film
1956	The Errol Flynn Theatre	Henrietta	Episode: "1000th Night of Don Juan"
1956, 1958	Sunday Night Theatre	Polly Tremayne, Jeanne Liron	Episodes: "Morning Star", "The Sulky Fire"
1957	The Twelve Pound Look	Lady Sims	TV film
1957	ITV Television Playhouse	Alicia Collins	Episode: "Love Her to Death"
1958	Web	Rita Carpenter	Episodes: "The Painting", "The Other Warren", "The Gallery"
1958	Sword of Freedom	Valeska	Episode: "The Lion and the Mouse"
1958	Dick Whittington and His Cat	Dick Whittington	TV film
1959	Epilogue to Capricorn	Lady Kerwin	TV series
1959, 1962	ITV Play of the Week	Molly, Ariane	Episodes: "The Signal", "Coach 7, Seat 15"
1960	Hotel Imperial	Madame Trazini	Episode: "The Leopardess in 424"
1961	Debt to a Spy	Madame Sophie	TV short
1961–62	Sir Francis Drake	Queen Elizabeth I	Main role
1963	Maupassant	Marquise Obardi	Episode: "Yvette"
1963, 1965	No Hiding Place	Paula Hudson, Paula Kelledy	Episodes: "A Pocketful of Bones", "Rat in a Trap"
1963–1965	Emergency Ward 10	Gillian Blaine	Guest role
1964	Love Story	Zoe Slater	Episode: "The Smile on the Face of a Tiger"
1964	The Indian Tales of Rudyard Kipling	Mrs. Threegan	Episodes: "Three: And an Extra", "The Sending of Dana Da", "The Rescue of Pluffles"
1966	This Man Craig	Joyce Maitland	Episode: "Period of Adjustment"
1966–67	United!	Margie Stringer	Guest role
1967	Vanity Fair	Mrs. O'Dowd	Episode: "The Celebrated Battle Scene"
1968	Comedy Playhouse	Aggie Plunkett	Episode: "The Family of Fred"
1968	Detective	Miss Mayberry	Episode: "The Deadly Climate"
1968	The Wednesday Play	Mrs. Da Tanka	Episode: "A Night with Mrs. Da Tanka"
1968–69	Thicker Than Water	Aggie Plunkett	TV series
1969	The Doctors	Mrs. Randall	Episodes: "1.8", "1.9"
1970	ITV Playhouse	Beatrice	Episode: "Brother and Sister"
1970	Up Pompeii!	Aphrodite	Episode: "Exodus"
1970	Steptoe and Son	Daphne Goodlace	Episode: "Two's Company"
1971	Doctor at Large	Mrs. Bentinck	Episode: "Trains & Notes & Veins"
1971	A Family at War	Dora Martin	Episode: "Flesh and Blood"
1972	Public Eye	Mrs. Podmore	Episode: "Mrs. Podmore's Cat"
1974	Thriller	Mrs. Garrick	Episode: "Color Him Dead"
1976	Angels	Miss Buckle	Episode: "Legacies"
1978	Do You Remember?	Milly Billet	Episode: "Night School"
1978	Tycoon	Mary Clark	TV series
1980	Time of My Life	Mrs. Wordsworth	Episodes: "1.4", "1.5"
1981	Crossroads	Jennifer Lamont	Episode: "1.3543"
1985	Lytton's Diary	Margot Shelley	Episode: "The Silly Season"
1990	Missing Persons	Phillida Meadowhite	TV film
1990	After Henry	Mrs Judd Skefferton	Episode: Party Politics
1991	Lovejoy	Madelene Gilbert	Episode: "National Wealth"
1991	Shrinks	Charlotte Merrick	Episode: "1.5"

== Box office ranking ==
For a number of years, British film exhibitors voted her among the top ten British stars at the box office via an annual poll in the Motion Picture Herald.

- 1950 – 9th
- 1951 – 8th
