= Inspector Hornleigh =

Fictional British police detective

- First appearance: Inspector Hornleigh Investigates
- Created by: Hans Wolfgang Priwin
- Portrayed by: S.J. Warmington (radio); John Longden (stage); Gordon Harker (film); Helmut Peine (television)

In-universe information
- Gender: Male
- Occupation: Police inspector
- Nationality: British

Inspector Hornleigh is a fictional British detective from Scotland Yard, the protagonist of a popular BBC radio series of the 1930s, three British films, a German television series, and three books (two of them language text books).

== Radio ==
The radio series Inspector Hornleigh Investigates was devised by Hans Wolfgang Priwin (later known as John Peter Priwin and, from 1948, John Peter Wynn), a German-Jewish refugee, and Hornleigh was played by S. J. Warmington. According to Priwin, Hornleigh was devised in an Italian restaurant in Great Portland Street in April 1937 during a meal with John Watt.

The series ran on the BBC's National station from 1937 to 1940, eventually as one element in the 50-minute show Monday Night at Seven (changed to Monday Night at Eight at the start of the Second World War). Each week Inspector Hornleigh interrogates various witnesses, one of whom makes some slip that incriminates him. Listeners were invited to match their wits against Hornleigh's by identifying the criminal. The mistake made by the witness is not disclosed until the end of the programme, when the story was partially rebroadcast until the clue was reached, when a voice would call 'Stop'.

Hornleigh was such a success that Priwin had received 75,000 appreciative (and sometimes not so appreciative) letters from listeners by December 1937. These included a number of suggested stories or actual scripts. Only two of these proved suitable for adaptation, however. One, "Kidnapped", a script by two 13 year-old schoolgirls, Noreen Scott and Stella Reichenberg, who had written a Hornleigh play for a school concert and then sent it in to the BBC, was adapted by Priwin and broadcast on 23 August 1937. Hornleigh was eventually replaced on Monday Night at Eight by another detective, Ernest Dudley's Dr. Morelle, a Harley Street psychiatrist and amateur sleuth.

By the end of 1937 Hornleigh stories had been broadcast in eighteen countries. Two stations ran the series in Hawaii. Anglophone territories were provided with recordings using the original cast, while Scandinavian countries broadcast translations set in the UK using the original name. A German-language version was broadcast in Switzerland with Hornleigh renamed Kriminalbeamten Hornli. In the Netherlands, Hornleigh's name was completely changed to Inspecteur Vlijmscherp.

Priwin wrote an article about Hornleigh for the Radio Times in 1937, and a Hornleigh story, "Hornleigh's Christmas", was published in the Radio Times Christmas number for 1938.

== Theatre ==
Earlier in 1938 Inspector Hornleigh had appeared in a play, The Mayfair Murder Mystery, performed at the Prince's Theatre (today the Shaftesbury Theatre), Shaftesbury Avenue. Hornleigh was played by John Longden. The play, Hornleigh's first full-length case, received a favourable review in The Manchester Guardian.

== Film ==
Between 1938 and 1940 a trilogy of films was made about Hornleigh, starring Gordon Harker in the title role: Inspector Hornleigh (1938), Inspector Hornleigh on Holiday (1939) and Inspector Hornleigh Goes To It (1940). All the films were made at Pinewood Studios in England. In the films Hornleigh is a cockney detective with the Metropolitan Police. He is accompanied by his inept Scottish sidekick Sergeant Bingham, played by Alastair Sim. The BBC radio series presented straight "whodunit" dramas, but the films were made as comedies. Despite their popularity, no further films were made because Sim wished to move on to other projects in order to avoid being typecast.

== Books ==
Priwin published a Hornleigh book, published by Hodder & Stoughton, in 1939. A Dutch translation, Inspecteur Vlijmscherp ondervraagt, Het eerste boek van een avontuur van Inspecteur Vlijmscherp, was published in 1940.

In 1939 L'Inspecteur Hornleigh sur la Piste, a French-language British school textbook adapted from the radio series by E. Schaerli, Senior Languages Master at Bancroft's School, was published by G. Bell and Sons. Schaerli wrote that 'L'Inspecteur Hornleigh sur la Piste is confidently expected to add variety to the lessons and to stimulate and sustain the keenness of the students'. Schaerli also published a German version, Kriminalkommissar Hornleighs Erlebnisse, in 1939 in the UK and in 1940 in the USA.

== Television ==
A television adaptation was made in West Germany in 1961, with Helmut Peine as Hornleigh.
