= Call signs in North America =

North American broadcast call signs

Call signs are frequently still used by North American broadcast stations, in addition to amateur radio and other international radio stations that continue to identify by call signs worldwide. Each country has a different set of patterns for its own call signs. Call signs are allocated to ham radio stations in Barbados, Canada, Mexico and the United States.

Many countries have specific conventions for classifying call signs by transmitter characteristics and location. The call sign format for radio and television call signs follows a number of conventions. All call signs begin with a prefix assigned by the International Telecommunication Union (ITU). For example, the United States has been assigned the following prefixes: AAA–ALZ, K, N, W. For a complete list, see international call sign allocations.

== Bermuda, Bahamas, and the Caribbean ==
Pertaining to their status as former or current colonies, all of the British West Indies islands shared the VS, ZB–ZJ, and ZN–ZO prefixes. The current, largely post-independence, allocation list is as follows:

- Anguilla (in amateur radio VP2E prefix)
- Antigua and Barbuda (uses V2 prefix)
- Bahamas (has the C6 prefix)
- Barbados (uses 8P)
- Bermuda (also uses VS, in amateur radio normally VP9)
- British Virgin Islands (for amateur radio uses VP2V)
- Cayman Islands (ZF for amateur operation, ZF1 for Grand Cayman, ZF8 for Little Cayman and ZF9 for Cayman Brac islands. Visiting reciprocal for all islands is ZF2)
- Dominica (Commonwealth of Dominica, uses J7)
- Grenada (uses J3)
- Jamaica (uses 6Y)
- Montserrat (for amateur operation VP2M prefix)
- St. Kitts and Nevis (uses V4)
- St. Lucia (uses J6)
- St. Vincent and the Grenadines (uses J8)
- Turks and Caicos Islands (typically uses VP5)

=== Cuba ===
Cuba uses the prefixes CL–CM, CO, and T4, with district numbers from 0 to 9 for amateur operations.

=== Dominican Republic ===
The Dominican Republic uses the prefixes HI–HJ.

=== French West Indies ===
All of the French possessions share the prefix F. Further divisions that are used by amateur stations are:

- Guadeloupe – uses FG
- Martinique – uses FM
- Saint Martin – uses FS
- Saint-Barthélemy – uses FJ

=== Haiti ===
Haiti has been assigned the call sign prefixes HH and 4V.

=== Netherlands Antilles ===
The Kingdom of the Netherlands use the PA–PI prefixes, while the Netherlands Antilles use the PJ prefix. Aruba has been assigned P4 by the ITU.

=== Trinidad and Tobago ===
The island nation of Trinidad and Tobago use the 9Y–9Z prefixes.

== Canada ==
Canadian broadcast stations are assigned a three-, four-, or five-letter base call sign (not including the "-FM", "-TV" or "-DT" suffix) beginning with CB, CF, CH, CI, CJ, CK, VF, or VO. The "CB" series calls are assigned to Chile by the ITU, but Canada makes de facto use of this series anyway for stations belonging to, but not exclusively broadcasting programs from, the Canadian Broadcasting Corporation (CBC).

Several other prefixes, including CG, CY-CZ, VA-VE, VG, and the XJ-XO range, are available, but are not used in broadcasting. Conventional radio and television stations almost exclusively use "C" call signs; with the exception of a few commercial radio stations in St. John's, Newfoundland and Labrador which existed prior to the admission of Newfoundland as a province in 1949, the "V" calls are restricted to specialized uses such as amateur radio.

== Mexico ==
Mexican broadcast stations are assigned call signs beginning with "XE" (for mediumwave and shortwave stations) or "XH" (for FM radio and television stations), followed by one and up to five letters and a suffix according to the band in which they broadcast, these suffixes are: "-AM", "-OC" (shortwave or Onda Corta), "-FM" and "-TDT" (Terrestrial Digital Television). The "-OL" (longwave or Onda Larga) and "-TV" suffixes are currently phased out as those bands are no longer used. Some FM and television stations have call signs beginning with "XE", usually reserved for AM radio stations. Most of these "XE" cases in FM and television stations were solicited by the concessionaires themselves so the stations would have the same call sign as an existing AM station (as it is the case of XEW-AM, XEW-TV and XEW-FM, all founded and owned by the Azcárraga family), while others are for disambiguation (like XHTV-TV and XETV-TV or XEIMT-TV and XHIMT-TV). All TV stations originally assigned with the "-TV" suffix, had been given the "-TDT" suffix as they made the digital switchover.

Television stations are required to identify every 30 minutes; there has been no equivalent requirement in radio since 2014. Television rebroadcasters are assigned the call signs of the station they are licensed to retransmit; for instance, XEZ-TDT, located on Cerro El Zamorano in Querétaro, has a repeater on Cerro Culiacán serving Celaya, Guanajuato, which is also XEZ-TV. Digital subchannels are not assigned a distinctive call sign; they keep the call sign of the station. The technical guidelines for digital television stations stipulate the use of PSIP short names matching the parent station (e.g. XHTDMX2, XHTDMX3).

Amateur radio stations in Mexico use "XE1" for the central region, "XE2" for the northern region, and "XE3" for the southern region. "XF" prefixes indicate islands. "XF4" is usually used for the Revillagigedo Islands and nearby islets. Special call signs for contests or celebrations are occasionally issued, often in the 4A and 6D series, although these will follow the usual district numbering system (4A3 for the south, etc.).

== United States ==
The earliest identification, used in the 1910s and into the early 1920s, was arbitrary. The U.S. government began requiring stations to use three-letter call signs around 1912, but they could be chosen at random. This system was replaced by the basic form of the current system in the early 1920s. Examples of pre-1920 stations include 8XK in Pittsburgh, Pennsylvania, which became KDKA in November 1920, and Charles Herrold's series of identifiers from 1909 in San Jose, California: first "This is the Herrold Station" or "San Jose calling", then the call signs FN, SJN, 6XF, and 6XE, then, with the advent of modern call signs, KQW in December 1921, and eventually KCBS from 1949 onward.

All broadcast call signs in the United States begin with either K or W, with "K" usually west of the Mississippi River and "W" usually east of it. Initial letters AA through AL, as well as N, are internationally allocated to the United States but are not used for broadcast stations.

In the United States, broadcast stations have call signs of three to seven characters in length, including suffixes for certain types of service, but the minimum length for new stations is four characters, and seven-character call signs result only from rare combinations of suffixes.

== See also ==
- City of license, another element of station licensing
- Facility ID, used by the FCC in the United States to distinguish broadcast stations without regard to call sign changes
