= Kipps (1941 film) =

1941 film by Carol Reed

- Directed by: Carol Reed
- Written by: H. G. Wells (novel); Sidney Gilliat; Frank Launder (uncredited)
- Produced by: Edward Black
- Starring: Michael Redgrave; Diana Wynyard; Phyllis Calvert
- Cinematography: Arthur Crabtree
- Edited by: R. E. Dearing
- Music by: Charles Williams
- Distributed by: 20th Century Fox
- Release dates: 28 June 1941 (UK); 24 May 1942 (USA)
- Running time: 111 minutes (UK); 82 minutes (USA)
- Country: United Kingdom
- Language: English

Kipps (US title The Remarkable Mr. Kipps) is a 1941 British comedy-drama film adaptation of H. G. Wells's 1905 novel of the same name. The film was directed by Carol Reed and stars Michael Redgrave as a draper's assistant who inherits a large fortune. The film's costumes were designed by Cecil Beaton.

The film is set on the south coast of England in Edwardian times, around 1902.

== Plot ==
The day before the fourteen-year-old Arthur "Artie" Kipps leaves to begin a seven-year apprenticeship, he asks his friend's sister, Ann Pornick, to be his girl. She gladly agrees. They split a silver sixpence and each keeps half.

Kipps goes to work for Mr. Shalford in a Folkestone drapery store. Years pass and Kipps grows up into an unremarkable young man. One day, he attends a free lecture on self-improvement presented by Chester Coote and decides to take a course. Coote steers the young man away from the literature class he would prefer to a woodworking class taught by Helen Walshingham, a member of the local gentry. Kipps is soon smitten with his lovely teacher, but she is mindful of his social inferiority and keeps her distance.

One night, actor and playwright Chitterlow rides his bicycle into Kipps and tears his trousers. Taking Kipps back to his lodgings to repair his clothes, they get drunk together, while Chitterlow tells Kipps about his latest play. By coincidence, one of Chitterlow's characters is also called Kipps, a name the writer got from a newspaper advertisement.

When Kipps arrives late for work, he is sacked for breaking one of Mr. Shalford's strict rules for live-in employees. Chitterlow arrives while he is working out his notice to tell Kipps that the advertisement was about him. It turns out that Kipps has inherited a large house and a fortune (£26,000) from a grandfather he had never met.

Chitterlow talks Kipps into investing £300 in his new play for a half share. At the bank, they run into Mr. Coote. Coote suggests that Kipps employ new solicitor Ronnie Walshingham to look after his fortune. When Kipps finds out that the man is Helen's brother, he becomes interested.

Soon, Coote and the Walshinghams have manoeuvred the naive Kipps into an engagement with Helen, though he is uncomfortable at her attempts at his self-improvement.

Kipps meets Ann paddling at the seaside, and they clearly still like each other. However he does not realise that she is now a parlour maid. When he re-encounters her at a formal tea party in the house where she serves, he is embarrassed, and his fiancée is also there. Ann puts her half sixpence into his hand. His feelings for her resurface. Kipps finds her in the scullery and kisses her and tells her he loves her. With the servant bells ringing for Ann, they impulsively rush off to get married.

The newlyweds quarrel over Kipps' insistence on maintaining his social position. Then Kipps receives a request to go to Ronnie Walshingham's office. He suspects it is for a breach-of-promise suit. Instead, Kipps is surprised to meet only Helen there. She has come to confess to him that Ronnie has speculated away all of Kipps' and her own family's money and fled. Kipps reassures Helen that he will not set the police on her brother, and she reassures him that she is resourceful enough to get by herself.

As all seems bleakest for Kipps, Chitterlow arrives from the theatre late at night. He informs Kipps that his play is a great success. It will have a long run, and Kipps will profit from his half-share in the show. It is enough for Kipps to open a bookshop and live comfortably with Ann and their baby son.

== Cast ==
- Philip Frost as Arthur Kipps as a boy
- Michael Redgrave as Arthur Kipps as a man
- Diana Wynyard as Helen Walshingham
- Diana Calderwood as Ann Pornick as a girl
- Phyllis Calvert as Ann Pornick as a woman
- Arthur Riscoe as Chitterlow
- Max Adrian as Chester Coote
- Helen Haye as Mrs. Walshingham
- Michael Wilding as Ronnie Walshingham
- Lloyd Pearson as Shalford
- Edward Rigby as Buggins, an older Shalford employee
- Mackenzie Ward as Pearce
- Hermione Baddeley as Miss Mergle
- Betty Ann Davies as Flo Bates
- Arthur Denton as Carshot
- Betty Jardine as Doris
- Frank Pettingell as old Kipps
- Beatrice Varley as Mrs. Kipps
- George Carney as old Pornick (scenes deleted)
- Irene Browne as Mrs. Bindon-Botting
- Peter Graves as Sidney Revel
- Viscount Castlerosse as man in bath chair

== Critical reception ==
The Monthly Film Bulletin wrote: "The discarding of preconceived ideas as to the physical appearance of the characters in the novel is necessary for the complete enjoyment of the film, which is well directed and admirably acted. Attention to detail of the period is most praiseworthy. Michael Redgrave is pathetically lovable as Kipps, and Diana Wynyard charmingly aloof as the proud Helen, who nevertheless could find a lot of use for Kipps' money. There is a perfect performance by Edward Rigby as a floor manager at the drapery stores and an admirable cameo study by Helen Haye as Mrs. Walshingham. Phyllis Calvert makes a very attractive Ann Pornick, while Max Adrian as Chester Cook and Arthur Riscoe as Chitterlow are to be congratulated on their performances. This story of a simple soul is well told."

Variety wrote: "Any effort to give impetus or sharpness to this late Victorian yarn isn’t discernible. Sidney Gilliat’s screenplay [from H.G. Wells novel], while in excellent taste and character, remains sprawled writing. Impression sneaks through that Carol Reed wasn’t exactly comfortable in the director chore on this type of limp yarn...Michael Redgrave is believable as the hick; Phyllis Calvert as the peachy domestic; Diana Wynyard as the tony milady for whom the lower-case Kipps almost sells his heart".
