= Naomi Sim =

English actress and writer (1913–1999)

- As a maid in Wedding Group (1936)
- Born: Naomi Merlith Plaskitt; 30 November 1913; Bedford, England
- Died: 3 August 1999 (aged 85); Henley-on-Thames, Oxfordshire, England
- Spouse: Alastair Sim (m. 1932; died 1976)
- Children: 1

Naomi Merlith Sim (née Plaskitt; 30 November 1913 – 3 August 1999) was an English actress and writer.

== Life ==
Naomi Plaskitt was born in Bedford in 1913, second daughter of solicitor Hugh Plaskitt and his wife Norah. Her parents, who were cousins, had an unhappy marriage due to Hugh's descent into alcoholism by the time of their elder daughter's birth; when Norah was pregnant with Naomi, she left the marriage and went to live in Bedford with her sister. Naomi was "effectively born into a single-parent family", having "little if any contact with her father"; Hugh Plaskitt died of malaria in Africa in 1917 whilst serving as a soldier during the First World War. Norah's lack of an income and financial dependence upon her relatives meant they "offered security but in return wielded enormous influence over the lives of Norah and Naomi".

She was initially educated in Bedford and later Scotland. When she was 12 years old she met Alastair Sim while appearing in a play, The Land of Heart's Desire, organised by Scottish Community Drama Association. Sim was an elocution teacher at an Edinburgh school at the time and was 25 years of age when they met. Plaskitt left school aged 14 and joined Sim's school of drama as his secretary after her mother gave her permission. Meanwhile, Sim was the Fulton lecturer in elocution at New College, Edinburgh.

In 1932 she had completed two years at the Royal Academy of Dramatic Art under a scholarship when she replaced her ambition for drama with her love for Sim. They married and they appeared in one film together, Wedding Group, in 1936.

In 1947 they built a house, "Forrigan", near Henley on Thames. Naomi would help Sim and give him advice, and he called her his "director". Together they unofficially adopted several boys who generally came from unhappy homes. The most noted of these was George Cole, who went on to have a career in acting. Cole appeared with Alastair Sim in 11 films, and in time he bought a house near 'Forrigan'.

After her husband's death in 1976, she wrote her autobiography that featured their life together. Dance and Skylark was published in 1988, She also wrote articles for The Oldie magazine.

Sim died in Henley-on-Thames in 1999.
