= Escape! (film) =

1930 film

- Directed by: Basil Dean
- Screenplay by: Basil Dean
- Based on: Escape; 1926 play by John Galsworthy
- Produced by: Basil Dean
- Starring: Gerald du Maurier; Edna Best; Gordon Harker; Madeleine Carroll
- Cinematography: Jack MacKenzie
- Edited by: Jack Kitchin
- Music by: Ernest Irving
- Production company: Associated Talking Pictures
- Distributed by: RKO Pictures
- Release dates: 28 August 1930 (London [press screening], UK)
- Running time: 70 minutes
- Country: United Kingdom
- Language: English
- Budget: £40,000 or $200,000
- Box office: $550,000

Escape! is a 1930 British crime film directed by Basil Dean and starring Gerald du Maurier, Edna Best and Gordon Harker. It was based on the 1926 play of the same title by John Galsworthy, which was adapted again as a film in 1948.

== Plot ==
Captain Matt Denant is a former army officer who had been pursued by Germans during the war. He is riding at a hunt and, though he enjoys the sport, he empathises with the fox who stands little chance against the hounds.

Later, after a dinner in London he decides to walk on his own through a busy Hyde Park. Denant begins talking with a girl in the park, who reveals herself to be a prostitute. Denant declines the woman's proposition and turns to continue on his walk. At that moment a plain clothes police officer accosts the woman and accuses her of harassing Denant. Denant protests her innocence, maintaining that she had committed no crime. Denant then distracts the policeman, in order to give the woman time to escape. He is then involved in a scuffle, which results in Denant punching the officer to the ground, who hits his head on a rail and promptly dies. Denant is charged with manslaughter and sentenced to five years' imprisonment at Dartmoor.

Two years later Denant is part of a prison party working on the moor when heavy fog quickly descends on the area. Emboldened by his experiences in Germany, he decides to attempt to escape in the mist. He passes the Warren House Inn, a remote country pub and sees that his disappearance has been reported by the local newspaper. Narrowly evading the local constabulary, he finds himself after two days back only a mile from the prison. Exhausted, he rests in a country house bedroom and the next morning is discovered by the lady of the house. Rather than report Denant, she gives him chocolate and a drink and allows him to shave. Empathising with Denant as a gentleman, she allows him to disguise himself in her husband's fishing gear and clears his path out of the estate.

Whilst fishing he is approached by another gentleman who realises Denant's identity and, reflecting on the case, offers him a cigar and "winks the other eye". Denant later hijacks a motorcar from a picnicking party and asks two walkers for directions to Bovey. They tell a pursuing police officer that they did not suspect the man due to him being a gentleman.

Overwhelmed by his ordeal, Denant reaches a quarry where he collapses from exhaustion. He is again discovered but evades the workers, eventually making his way into an upper-class home where he is again protected, this time by two girls named Dora and Grace. Finally, he runs into the village church as the net closes around him. The parson distracts the surrounding policemen, but rather than let the vicar break his honour and lie to the inspector, Denant reveals himself and surrenders. The vicar shakes Denant's hand as he is led away, reflecting that he was a "fine" and "loyal" fellow who had committed a noble act of martyrdom.

== Cast ==
- Gerald du Maurier as Captain Matt Denant
- Edna Best as Shingled Lady
- Gordon Harker as Convict
- Horace Hodges as Gentleman
- Madeleine Carroll as Dora
- Mabel Poulton as Girl of the Town
- Lewis Casson as Farmer
- Ian Hunter as Detective
- Austin Trevor as Parson
- Marie Ney as Grace
- Felix Aylmer as Governor
- Ben Field as Captain
- Fred Groves as Shopkeeper
- Nigel Bruce as Constable
- S. J. Warmington as Warder
- Phyllis Konstam as Wife
- Ann Casson as Girl
- George Curzon as Constable

== Production ==
Escape! was the first film produced by Associated Talking Pictures (ATP), a company formed by Basil Dean, a prominent theatre director who had recently been increasingly involved in film, enlisting the distinguished actor-manager Sir Gerald du Maurier as the company's chairman. ATP had been intended to capitalise on the shift from silent cinema to sound and, in January 1930, Dean announced that ATP had reached an agreement with RKO, then one of the major Hollywood film studios, to produce joined UK/US films in British studios. As well as receive national release in the UK, the agreement indicated ATP's films would also be released widely in America, benefiting from RKO's chain of cinemas. RKO and RCA technicians were dispatched to England to demonstrate to British crews how to set up sound recording equipment on location shoots. Escape!, based on a John Galsworthy play, was to the first film produced under this agreement after the rights were purchased from Paramount Pictures.

Dean knew this presented a major opportunity to demonstrate to the American studios that prestigious films could be produced in England, setting to work on engaging a high-profile cast with experience of the theatre. His first choice for the central role of Capt Matt Denant was Colin Clive, who turned Dean down in order to travel to Hollywood where he was to star in the role of Henry Frankenstein, creator of the monster in Universal's wildly successful horror film Frankenstein. In his place, Dean persuaded his reluctant chairman of ATP, Gerald du Maurier, a pre-eminent stage actor, to take the role himself.

For his supporting cast, Dean approached actors from the stage production, reducing the time needed to dedicate to rehearsals. Austin Trevor who had played the role of the Parson in London's West End in 1926 and New York City on Broadway the following year, reprised the role one more. The cast included Madeleine Carroll who would later become the world's highest-paid actress, George Curzon in his first film role, and Sir Lewis Casson in a rare on-screen credit.

As ATP did not yet have their own production facility (Dean would soon develop a full sound studio at Ealing Studios), Beaconsfield Studios, recently equipped to make sound films, was used instead. Dean's intention was to use Escape! to showcase England's picturesque scenery, with shoots arranged for Hyde Park Corner, a variety of locations around Dartmoor, and hunting scenes filmed in the village of Wansford. The Hyde Park night shoot attracted controversy, as Dean arranged to use amateur extras to populate the busy scenes rather than pay an excess for professional artists. In the face of pressure from acting unions, Dean eventually relented. The first attempt to film the Hyde Park scenes were compromised when Dean tried to record the music of the Welsh Guards band whom he had engaged for this purpose. A thrush landed on the microphone and refused to move. Frustrated, the musical director threw a piece of wood at the bird, which missed, hitting and destroying the microphone. The night's shooting was abandoned. It was the first film wholly intended as a sound film to be released in the UK.

== Critical response ==
The Bioscope declared Escape! to be a "brilliant" adaptation, but noting that it "struck an occasional theatrical note". The location scenes were also praised, with du Maurier's performance declared to be "effective", with the climax displaying "deep sincerity". However, the paper felt that "too much of his time is spent clambering over walls, hiding in barns and driving an old Ford car over the downs". Overall, the reviewer believed that the potential of the film "to be a great popular success can hardly be questioned". Kinematograph Weekly believed the film was technically "flawless", acknowledging that Dean has worked hard to make the picture a success, with "imagination and good camera consciousness". However, it also noted that, though du Maurier's performance was "polished", he was "rather stilted and inclined to put too much stress on the sportsmanship, nobility, and breeding of the character that he interprets".

Though the film was critical success in England, it failed to recoup its £40,000 budget. Immediately following its British release, Escape! was released in the United States, appearing in over 700 cinemas nationally. This was an unprecedented release for a British film, but it ultimately failed to make any impact on American audiences.
