= XEW =

XEW is the call sign of the following broadcast stations in Mexico City, Mexico:

- XEW-TV, channel 2
- XEW-AM, 900 kHz branded as W-Radio
- XEW-FM, 96.9 MHz
