= The Woman with No Name =

1950 film

- Directed by: Ladislao Vajda
- Written by: Guy Morgan; Ladislao Vajda
- Based on: novel Happy Now I Go by Theresa Charles
- Produced by: John Stafford
- Starring: Phyllis Calvert; Edward Underdown; Helen Cherry; Richard Burton
- Cinematography: Otto Heller
- Edited by: Richard Best
- Music by: Allan Gray
- Production company: Independent Film Producers
- Distributed by: Associated British-Pathé (UK)
- Release date: October 1950 (UK)
- Running time: 84 minutes
- Country: United Kingdom
- Language: English
- Budget: £116,500
- Box office: £113,268 (UK)

The Woman with No Name (U.S.: Her Panelled Door) is a 1950 British drama film directed by Ladislao Vajda and starring Phyllis Calvert, Edward Underdown, Helen Cherry, Richard Burton and James Hayter. It was written by Guy Morgan and Ladislao Vajda based on the 1947 novel Happy Now I Go by Theresa Charles.

== Plot ==
Yvonne Winter is an amnesiac, a victim of the wartime bombing of the London hotel where she is staying. At a country hospital she meets the pilot, Nick Chamerd, who saved her life. They fall in love and plan to marry, but he is killed on active duty. Yvonne's real husband hires detectives to find her. She is brought home and starts to piece together her past, but not everything she finds there brings her happiness.

== Cast ==
- Phyllis Calvert as Yvonne Winter
- Edward Underdown as Lake Winter
- Helen Cherry as Sybil
- Richard Burton as Nick Charmerd
- Anthony Nicholls as doctor
- James Hayter as Captain Bradshawe
- Betty Ann Davies as Beatrice
- Amy Veness as Sophie
- Andrew Osborn as Paul Hammond
- Patrick Troughton as Colin
- Leslie Phillips as 1st sapper officer
- Terence Alexander as 2nd sapper officer
- Richard Pearson as Tony

== Production ==
Calvert invested her own savings in the film, estimated between £12,000-£15,000.

== Reception ==
=== Box office ===
The film earned £105,000 to the producers.

=== Critical ===
The Monthly Film Bulletin wrote: "A portentous and improbable melodrama, indifferently acted, and complete with explorations of moorland country in mist and thunder-storm, a nightmare dream sequence in negative, and thundering background music, which fails to supply the suspense lacking in the direction."

Variety wrote: "Boxoffice barometer for Her Panelled Door won't rise much above fair, since it is a somber affair based on the old amnesia gimmick and presented with comparatively little imagination. ... The whole business is acted with a heavy hand, but the uninspired screenplay by Guy Morgan and Ladislas Vajda seldom affords opportunity for much more than staid, spotty sequences. Direction by Vajda is no more inspiring than the story; photography by Otto Heller is firstrate; music by Allan Gray is excellont."
