= Two Thousand Women =

1944 war film by Frank Launder

- Directed by: Frank Launder
- Screenplay by: Frank Launder add dialogue Michael Pertwee
- Produced by: Edward Black executive Maurice Ostrer
- Starring: Phyllis Calvert; Flora Robson; Patricia Roc; Renée Houston
- Cinematography: Jack E. Cox
- Edited by: R. E. Dearing
- Music by: Hans May
- Production company: Gainsborough Studios
- Distributed by: Gainsborough Studios; Ellis Films (US)
- Release dates: 6 November 1944 (UK); October 1951 (US)
- Running time: 97 min. (UK); 81 min. (US)
- Country: United Kingdom
- Language: English
- Box office: 547,159 admissions (France, 1945)

Two Thousand Women is a 1944 British comedy-drama war film about a German internment camp in Occupied France which holds British women who have been resident in the country. Three RAF aircrewmen, whose bomber has been shot down, enter the camp and are hidden by the women from the Germans.

The film was released in the United States in 1951 in a severely cut-down version under the title of House of 1,000 Women. Per the British Film Institute database, this is the second in an "unofficial trilogy" by Launder and Gilliat, along with Millions Like Us (1943) and Waterloo Road (1945).

== Plot ==
During the 1940 Battle of France, Rosemary Brown (Patricia Roc), an English novice nun, is apprehended by French soldiers who have mistaken her for a fifth columnist. She is sentenced to face a firing squad, but the Germans arrive and she is sent (without her habit, which is being cleaned) to an internment camp in a grand hotel at the spa town of Marneville. She journeys there in the back of a lorry with journalist Freda (Phyllis Calvert), stripper Bridie (Jean Kent), and posh Muriel (Flora Robson) and her travelling companion, Miss Meredith (Muriel Aked). At the camp, they meet Maud (Renée Houston), Margaret (Anne Crawford), Nellie (Dulcie Gray), Mrs Burtshaw (Thora Hird) and Teresa King (Betty Jardine). While two women are allocated to each room, Bridie uses her charms with Sergeant Hentzner (Carl Jaffe) to obtain a room to herself. Although the hotel is very luxurious, not all the baths have a water supply. The hotel proprietor, Monsieur Boper (Guy Le Feuvre), is believed to be collaborating with the Germans.

The women receive a radio from an unknown source, but it is swiftly confiscated by the Germans. The women conclude that they have a stool pigeon, nicknamed "Poison Ivy", amongst the dozen who knew about the radio. Nellie reports that she saw the German file on Rosemary; the charge of being a fifth columnist causes suspicion to fall on her. However, Freda and Maud do not believe it. They warn Rosemary, who reveals she is a nun.

Freda deliberately violates the blackout during a night-time air raid by the RAF. One plane crashes nearby after its crew bail out. Pilot Officer Jimmy Moore (James McKechnie), Sergeant Alec Harvey (Reginald Purdell) and Dave Kennedy (Robert Arden) seek refuge in the hotel. The women hide them, but have to conceal the fact from Teresa King, who is revealed to be a Nazi spy. Later, Alec recognises Rosemary as Mary Maugham, a singer whose boyfriend murdered his wife; she became a nun as a result. Jimmy and Rosemary begin to fall for each other, as do Dave and Bridie. Hentzner finds Dave, who manages to strangle him quietly, and his body is hidden.

The women devise a plan to enable the men to escape during a concert they will put on. To ensure the Germans stay until the end, Freda persuades Bridie to perform her act last. However, when Bridie overhears what Dave thinks of her (due to her fraternisation with the Germans), she slips Teresa a note betraying all. Freda makes Dave write an apology professing his love, which she delivers to Bridie. Bridie then goes to Teresa's room and sees that she has already read the note. The two women fight. Teresa wins and alerts Frau Holweg, but Maud knocks Holweg out. However, Teresa sees the airmen escaping and warns the commandant, but it is too late. The trio escape, with the aid of Monsieur Boper, who is not a collaborator after all. The women defiantly sing "There'll Always Be an England".

== Cast ==
- Phyllis Calvert as Freda Thompson
- Flora Robson as Miss Muriel Manningford
- Patricia Roc as Rosemary Brown
- Renée Houston as Maud Wright
- Reginald Purdell as Alec Harvey
- Anne Crawford as Margaret Long
- Jean Kent as Bridie Johnson
- James McKechnie as Jimmy Moore
- Robert Arden as Dave Kennedy (credited as Rob Arden)
- Carl Jaffe as Sergeant Hentzner
- Muriel Aked as Miss Claire Meredith
- Kathleen Boutall as Mrs. Hadfield
- Hilda Campbell-Russell as Mrs. Cornelia Hope Latimer
- Christiana Forbes as Frau Holweg
- Thora Hird as Mrs. Burtshaw
- Dulcie Gray as Nellie Skinner
- Joan Ingram as Mrs. Tatmarsh
- Betty Jardine as Teresa King
- Christiane De Maurin as Annette
- Guy Le Feuvre as Monsieur Boper (credited as Guy Lefeuvre)
- Paul Sheridan as French Officer

== Production ==
It was one of the last films produced at Gainsborough by Edward Black.

Frank Launder stated later that he "should have treated the subject more seriously...that it would have been a bigger film if I concentrated less on the comedy and more on the drama".

Phyllis Calvert said she was offered the part of the nun who falls in love with a pilot, but turned it down and Patricia Roc played it instead. Calvert played Freda Thompson, even though she felt Launder and Gilliat "didn't like me turning down a part they had written for me, which I can understand". According to Calvert, Renée Houston and Flora Robson "didn't get on at all" while the film was being made.

== Reception ==
According to trade papers, the film was a success at the British box office in 1944.

== American release ==
Perhaps because of the success of Three Came Home, the film was released in the USA in 1951 in a severely cut version under the title of House of 1,000 Women. The American version of the film available on DVD ignores Patricia Roc's adventures as well as several subplots and starts the film with the transport to the internment hotel.
