= Epilogue to Capricorn =

1959 British TV series

Epilogue to Capricorn is a British television mini-series. It was a six-part serial which aired in 1959. Cast included Jean Kent and Peter Wyngarde. It was produced by Associated Television and aired on ITV. Unlike most British television series of the 1950s, it survives intact.
