= Edward Underdown =

English actor (1908–1989)

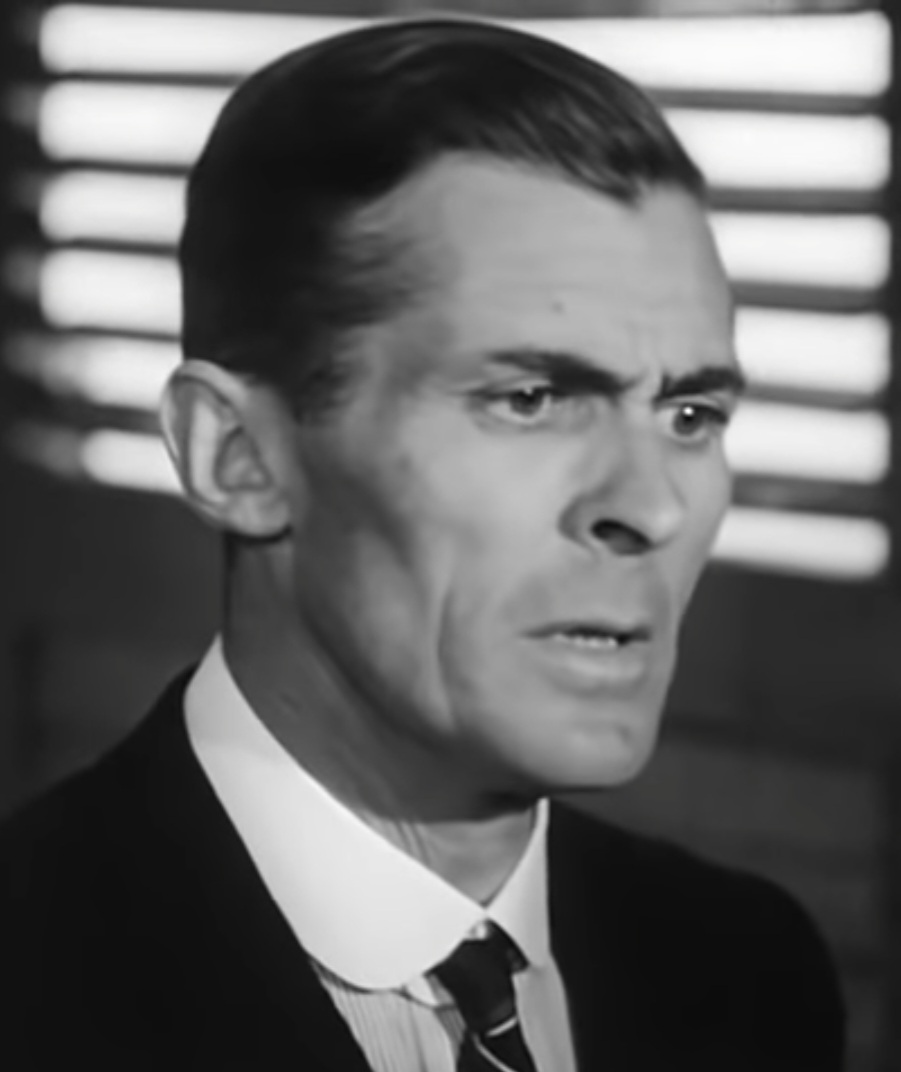
- Underdown in Beat the Devil (1953)
- Born: Charles Edward Underdown; 3 December 1908; London, England
- Died: 15 December 1989 (aged 81); Hampshire, England
- Occupations: Actor, jockey
- Years active: 1932–1980
- Spouse: Hon. Rosemary Sybella Violet Grimston (m. 1953; div. 1964)

Charles Edward Underdown (3 December 1908 – 15 December 1989) was an English theatre, cinema and television actor.

== Early life ==
Underdown was the son of Harry Charles Baillie Underdown and Rachel Elizabeth Orr. Born in London, he was educated at Eton College. There his looks resulted in him being nominated 'Pop Bitch' – the prettiest boy available to the senior students of Pop, the Eton Society.

== Notable work ==
Underdown's early theatre credits include: Noël Coward's Words and Music and Tonight at 8.30; Cole Porter's Nymph Errant; Moss Hart & Irving Berlin's Stop Press; and Streamline.

His film credits include: They Were Not Divided, Beat the Devil, Wings of the Morning, The Rainbow Jacket, The Woman's Angle, Her Panelled Door, The Camp on Blood Island, Dr. Terror's House of Horrors, Thunderball, Khartoum, The Magic Christian and Digby, the Biggest Dog in the World.

Television appearances include: Dad's Army, Danger Man, The Saint, The Avengers, The Rat Catchers, Weavers Green, Man in a Suitcase, Doomwatch, The Regiment, Colditz, Upstairs, Downstairs, Survivors, The Duchess of Duke Street and Doctor Who.

Both Wings of the Morning and The Rainbow Jacket were set in his beloved racing world, the former being set on Epsom Downs. Wings of the Morning, starring Henry Fonda, was Britain's first Technicolor film.

Edward Underdown was also a gentleman jockey and rode with great aplomb in both flat and hurdle races (see references to his riding career in John Hislop's books).

In 1950 he was voted by British exhibitors as the most promising male screen newcomer.

According to Ian Fleming's stepson, Underdown was the novelist's preferred choice for James Bond.

== Personal life ==
Underdown married Hon. Rosemary Sybella Violet Grimston, daughter of Robert Grimston, 1st Baron Grimston of Westbury and Sybil Rose Neumann, on 10 February 1953. Charles Underdown and Rosemary Grimston were sixth cousins through their common ancestors Thomas Villiers, 1st Earl of Clarendon and Lady Charlotte Capell.

He died on 15 December 1989 in Hampshire aged 81.

== Theatre appearances ==
- Words and Music, Adelphi Theatre, London (1932–1933). The production was written and directed by Noël Coward.
- Nymph Errant, Adelphi Theatre, London (1933–1934). The production featured music and lyrics by Cole Porter.
- Streamline (revue), Palace Theatre, London (1932–1933).
- Stop Press, Adelphi Theatre, London (1934–1935). This was the London production of Moss Hart and Irving Berlin's revue, As Thousands Cheer.
- Tonight at 8.30 (billed as To-night at 7:30, due to the local curtain time), Liverpool Empire Theatre, Liverpool (November 1935)
- Tonight at 8.30, Phoenix Theatre, London (opened 9 January 1936) and New York (opened 24 November 1936).
- You Can't Take It with You, St. James's Theatre, London (opened 1937).
- The Grass is Greener, St Martin's Theatre, London (1958) and Theatre Royal, Brighton.
- The Long Sunset, Mermaid Theatre, London (1961).
- Past Imperfect, Theatre Royal, Brighton (1965).

== Filmography ==
- The Warren Case (1934) – Hugh Waddon
- Girls, Please! (1934) – Jim Arundel
- Annie, Leave the Room! (1935) – John Brandon
- Wings of the Morning (1937) – Don Diego
- The Drum (1938) – Undetermined Role (uncredited)
- Inspector Hornleigh (1939) – Peter Dench the Chancellor's Secretary
- Lucky to Me (1939) – Malden's Friend (uncredited)
- Inspector Hornleigh Goes To It (1941)
- The October Man (1947) – Passport Official
- The Woman in the Hall (1947) – Neil Ingelfield
- Brass Monkey (1948) – Max Taylor
- Man on the Run (1949) – Slim Elfey
- They Were Not Divided (1950) – Philip
- The Woman with No Name (1950) – Lake Winter
- The Dark Man (1951) – Detective Inspector Viner
- The Promise (1952) – Stephen Harker (story based on John 4)
- The Woman's Angle (1952) – Robert Mansell
- The Voice of Merrill (1952) – Hugh Allen
- Street of Shadows (1953) – Det. Insp. Johnstone
- Recoil (1953) – Michael Conway
- Beat the Devil (1953) – Harry Chelm
- The Rainbow Jacket (1954) – Tyler
- The Camp on Blood Island (1958) – Major Dawes
- The Two-Headed Spy (1958) – Kaltenbrunner
- Information Received (1961) – Drake
- The Third Alibi (1961) – Dr. Murdoch
- The Day the Earth Caught Fire (1961) – Dick Sanderson
- Edgar Wallace Mysteries (Locker 69) (1962) – Bennett Sanders
- The Bay of St Michel (1963) – Col. Harvey
- Dr. Crippen (1963) – The Prison Governor
- Man in the Middle (1963) – Major Wyclif
- Woman of Straw (1964) – First Executive (uncredited)
- Traitor's Gate (1964) – Inspector Adams
- Dr. Terror's House of Horrors (1965) – Tod (segment 1 "Werewolf")
- Thunderball (1965) – Sir John, Air Vice Marshal
- Khartoum (1966) – Col. William Hicks
- Triple Cross (1966) – Air Marshal
- The Great Pony Raid (1968) – Snowy
- The Hand of Night (1968) – Otto Gunhter
- The Magic Christian (1969) – Prince Henry (uncredited)
- The Last Valley (1971) – Gnarled Peasant
- Running Scared (1972) – Mr. Betancourt
- Digby, the Biggest Dog in the World (1973) – Grandfather
- The Abdication (1974) – Gustav II Adolf, Christina's father
- Tarka the Otter (1979) – Hibbert

== Television appearances ==
- Dial 999 (TV series) (1959) – Heads or Tails, Episode 36, (filmed in 1958). Harley.
- One Step Beyond (1961) -The Tiger, Season 3, Episode 34, 20 June 1961. Mr. Hayes.
- Danger Man (1964–1966) – Max Dell / Capt. Morgan / Lord Anthony Denby
- The Saint (1965) – Jack Laurie
- The Avengers – episodes The Murder Market, The Living Dead (1965, 1967) – Jonathan Stone / Rupert Staplow
- The Rat Catchers (1966) – Lemnitz
- Weavers Green (1966) – Bobby Brent
- Man in a Suitcase (1967–1968) – Maxted / Ranki
- Doomwatch (1970) – Chairman of Tribunal
- Dad's Army (1972) – Major General Sir Charles Holland
- The Regiment (1973) – ICS Man
- Colditz (1974) – Col. Mansell
- Upstairs, Downstairs – episode News from the Front (1974) – General Nesfield
- Survivors (1977) – Frank Garner
- The Duchess of Duke Street (1977) – Adjutant-General
- Doctor Who (in the serial Meglos) (1980) – Zastor (final appearance)

== Love of horses ==
Edward Underdown's father owned a Norfolk estate in the Stanford Battle area. It was here that Edward learnt and developed his riding.

Before his career as an actor Edward was a gentleman jockey and rode with great aplomb both on the flat and over sticks (see references to his riding career in John Hislop's books).

The Norfolk estate is mentioned in Bill Pertwee's book about the making of Dad's Army. One of the Dad's Army episodes was by co-incidence filmed at the estate. By this time the estate was owned by the War Office and nothing was left except for the verandah and stables. As soon as John Le Mesurier arrived he realised it was familiar to him from weekend parties Edward's father had invited him to in the 1930s. So it was that Edward found himself working in a television series that featured part of his old home.

The films Wings of the Morning and The Rainbow Jacket were set in the horse racing world, the former being set on Epsom Downs.

Finally, after his acting career he worked as a steward at Newbury Racecourse. This was described by Bill Pertwee as "fitting for a man who not only loved horses but was also an expert rider." (ibit, page 86).

== Military service ==
On wanting to sign-up, Edward Underdown's first approach was to the Wiltshire Yeomanry. He reputedly appeared at the depot with his friend, Sandy Carlos Clarke, who had recently returned from Canada working as a ranch hand. When asked by the recruiting Sergeant to state their professions, Underdown replied, "film star" and Carlos Clarke answered, "cowboy" and thinking this was a joke, the sergeant stated that their services were not required. Underdown did subsequently join the Wiltshire Yeomanry whilst Clarke found a post with another Yeomanry regiment.

Underdown went on to have a distinguished Second World War record as an officer in the Wiltshire Yeomanry serving in the 8th Army in Africa.

After the war Edward resumed his acting career but remained in the Territorial Army. He remained in the Territorial Army Reserve of Officers until he reached the age limit. He retired as captain on 7 November 1959 and retained the rank of honorary major.
