= Wedding Group =

- Feature on the film in Picture Show magazine
- Directed by: Alex Bryce; Campbell Gullan
- Written by: Hugh Brooke; Selwyn Jepson
- Based on: Wedding Group (radio play) by Philip Wade
- Produced by: Leslie Landau
- Starring: Fay Compton; Patric Knowles; Barbara Greene
- Cinematography: Roy Kellino
- Edited by: Reginald Beck
- Music by: Charles Cowlrick; Colin Wark
- Production company: Fox Film Company
- Distributed by: Twentieth Century Fox Film Company
- Release date: March 1936
- Running time: 68 minutes
- Country: United Kingdom
- Language: English

Wedding Group (also known as The Nurse in Grey; U.S. title: Wrath of Jealousy) is a 1936 British drama film directed by Alex Bryce and Campbell Gullan and starring Fay Compton, Patric Knowles and Barbara Greene. It was written by Hugh Brooke and Selwyn Jepson based on the 1935 radio play of the same title by Philip Wade, and made at Wembley Studios as a quota quickie.

== Plot ==
In 1850s Scotland Janet Graham, the young daughter of the village's Minister, falls in love with dashing army lieutenant Robert Smith. Because of the trickery of her jealous elder sister Margaret, Janet and Robert are separated. Robert goes to war, and Janet joins Florence Nightingale in the Crimea, where she again meets Robert, who is now injured, and nurses him. They are eventually reconciled when Margaret's subterfuge is revealed.

== Cast ==
- Fay Compton as Florence Nightingale
- Patric Knowles as Robert Smith
- Barbara Greene as Janet Graham
- Alastair Sim as Angus Graham
- Bruce Seton as Dr. Jock Carnegie
- Ethel Glendinning as Margaret Graham
- Arthur Young as Dr. Granger
- Naomi Plaskitt as Jessie, the maid
- David Hutcheson as George Harkness
- Michael Wilding as Dr. Hutherford
- Derek Blomfield
- Polly Emery
- Billy Dear

== Reception ==
The Monthly Film Bulletin wrote: "This picture of life in a Scottish village is, on the whole, delightful. The atmosphere is realistic; there is some dry humour, pathos, and unaffected sentiment. ... The later scenes in the Crimea are less convincing, and Fay Compton, as Florence Nightingale, has a comparatively unimportant part. Alastair Sim, Ethel Glendinning, and Patric Knowles support most capably the very young Barbara Greene, who makes a promising début. The direction is, in the main, sympathetic, and the recording of the dialect dialogue particularly clear."

The Daily Film Renter wrote: "Sympathetically directed story of Highland girl's romance with Army officer coveted by jealous sister, who uses unscrupulous methods to separate them. Highlights take in scenes of Florence Nightingale engaged on work of mercy in Crimea, and striking portrayal of heroine by Barbara Greene, highly promising recruit to British screen. Development obvious early on, but subject's inherent sincerity, and strong acting put it into useful support class for popular patrons."

Kine Weekly wrote: "Tender, sentimental period romantic drama, Barriesque in design and execution. The fragile plot is told with a charm that invests it with strength and feminine appeal, the acting is sincere, the atmosphere picturesque, and the direction smooth and understanding. Restful and friendly, the entertainment is admirably designed for the consumption of the family."

Picture Show wrote: "Pleasant romance set chiefly in a little Scottish village in the early Victorian age. Barbara Greene, a newcomer, shows decided promise as Janet, whose path of romance is decidedly rough, and gives a charming performance. Fay Compton makes a brief appearance in the latter part of the film as Florence Nightingale, but has little opportunity. There are some delightful touches of Scottish humour."
