= Her Favourite Husband =

1950 film by Mario Soldati

- Directed by: Mario Soldati
- Written by: Noel Langley; Mario Monicelli; Steno; Mario Soldati
- Based on: play by Peppino De Filippo
- Produced by: Colin Lesslie; Carlo Ponti; John Sutro
- Starring: Jean Kent; Robert Beatty; Gordon Harker; Margaret Rutherford; Rona Anderson
- Cinematography: Mario Bava
- Edited by: Douglas Robertson
- Music by: Nino Rota
- Production company: Lux Film
- Distributed by: Renown Pictures; Lux Film
- Release date: September 1950
- Running time: 79 minutes
- Countries: United Kingdom; Italy
- Language: English

Her Favourite Husband (also known as The Taming of Dorothy and Quel bandito sono io) is a 1950 British-Italian comedy film directed by Mario Soldati and starring Jean Kent, Robert Beatty and Margaret Rutherford. The screenplay was by Noel Langley, based on an adaptation by Stefano Vanzina (as Steno), Mario Monicelli and Soldati of the 1947 play Quel bandito sono io! by Peppino De Filippo. The film's art direction was by Piero Gherardi.

== Plot ==
Mild mannered Italian bank clerk Antonio, dominated by his English wife Dorothy, is the double of Leo L'Americano, a local gangster. The gangster kidnaps Antonio and takes his place as husband in the family, to give him cover for a big bank robbery, which he plans to pin on Antonio. Farcical confusions ensue.

== Cast ==
- Jean Kent as Dorothy Pellegrini
- Robert Beatty as Antonio Pellegrini
- Gordon Harker as Godfrey Dotherington
- Margaret Rutherford as Mrs. Dotherington
- Rona Anderson as Stellina
- Walter Crisham as Caradiotto
- Max Adrian as Catoni
- Tamara Lees as Rosana
- Michael Balfour as Pete
- Jack McNaughton as El Greco
- Norman Shelley as Mr. Dobson
- Danny Green as Angel Face
- Joss Ambler as Mr. Wilson
- Mary Hinton as Mrs. Wilson
- Peter Illing as Commissario Scaletti
- Jimmy Ventola as Ciocio Pellegrini
- Andreas Malandrinos as customs officer

== Critical reception ==
The Monthly Film Bulletin wrote: "Gangster comedy which suffers from a profusion of English actors posing unsuccessfully as comic Italians, and from direction based on the principle that noise and muddle on the screen amounts to comedy. The whole effect is that of a charade which has got completely out of hand."

In British Sound Films: The Studio Years 1928–1959 David Quinlan rated the film as "mediocre", writing: "Film mistakes noise and muddle for comedy."

Leslie Halliwell said: "Rather tiresome Italian-set comedy with funny moments."

TV Guide wrote, "corny dialog bogs this film down much of the time."

Allmovie described it as "a genial romp distinguished by a sizeable supporting cast of familiar British players."
