= XHTV-TDT =

Television station in Mexico City

- Mexico City; Mexico
- Channels: Digital: 15 (UHF); Virtual: 4
- Branding: N+ Foro

Programming
- Affiliations: 4.1: N+ Foro; 4.2: CV Directo

Ownership
- Owner: Grupo Televisa; (Televimex, S.A. de C.V.)
- Sister stations: XEW-TDT, XHGC-TDT, XEQ-TDT, Televisa Regional

History
- First air date: August 31, 1950
- Former call signs: XHTV-TV (1950–2015)
- Former names: Canal 4 (1950–1997); Central 4 (1997–2001); 4TV (2001–2010); Foro TV (2010–2022); Foro (2022–2024)
- Former channel numbers: Analog: 4 (VHF, 1950–2015); Digital: 49 (UHF, 2005–2018)
- Call sign meaning: XH Televisión

Technical information
- Licensing authority: CRT
- ERP: 270 kW
- HAAT: 612.7 m (2,010 ft)
- Transmitter coordinates: 19°35′22.5″N 99°06′55.54″W
- Repeaters: RF 15 Ixtapaluca, State of Mexico

Links
- Website: www.nmas.com.mx/foro-tv

XHTV-TDT (channel 4) is a television station in Mexico City, Mexico, serving as the flagship transmitter of the N+ Foro channel. It is owned and operated by Grupo Televisa alongside XEW-TDT, XHGC-TDT and XEQ-TDT carrying Las Estrellas, El 5* and NU9VE respectively; all four channels are run by TelevisaUnivision, which Grupo Televisa owns a majority stake in the company. Foro itself is operated by Triton Comunicaciones, which was Televisa's news division prior to the 2022 split.

Prior to 2010, channel 4 was a general entertainment network, carrying a variety of programs throughout its existence. Beginning that year, the Televisa Networks–owned Foro TV moved to channel 4, effectively dropping all non-news programming and as a result, Foro TV's oversight was moved to Televisa's broadcast division. The station is the first television station in Mexico and the oldest television channel in said country and Latin America.

== History ==
Logo as 4-TV Canal de la Ciudad, used full-time from September 2008 to August 2010.

XHTV was Mexico's first television station and one of the building blocks of Telesistema Mexicano, which became Televisa in 1973.

Romulo O'Farril received the concession for XHTV in 1949, granted to Televisora de México S.A., owned by Novedades, O'Farril's existing newspaper. The station received equipment starting in March 1950, ending with the delivery of a mobile studio in July that year. Test broadcasts started on July 5. Its facilities were located at the National Lottery Building, the highest in the city at the time. Around 2,000 sets picked up its signal. Its broadcasts started on September 1 with the live coverage of the annual presidential message to the opening of the Congress, followed by regular programming from 5pm (the first program being Teatro de la Fantasía) to 7:30pm, which included an extended news bulletin with comments of the presidential ceremony. The official inauguration, however, took place the previous day, on August 31, with a "artistic musical" program from the Jockey Club of the Hipódromo de las Américas with the participation of the Secretary of Communications, Agustín García López. Initially, it aired regular programming for two hours a day each evening, from 5pm to 7pm, with longer programming on Sundays from 4pm to 7pm. In order to increase its production capacities, the station moved to two new premises in 1951, with studios at Bucareli street number 4 and Balderas street.

An American survey from a correspondent to TV-Radio Life magazine in 1952 said that O'Farrill's programs were "poorly produced", that the films seen on the station were older than in the United States at the time and that the quality of the technical staff was "questionable", paling in contrast to XEW. At the end of the year, XHTV triumphed over XEW in theatrical performances and remote broadcasts, but lost its grip on operatic broadcasts when XEW's program presented by Raúl Chávez beat XETV's analog in the second half of the year.

In 1955, XHTV became a part of Telesistema Mexicano, and, as consequence, it moved to the new Televicentro facilities shared by the three stations. The station produced telenovelas until 1961, with Niebla being the last one. Since then, telenovelas were largely produced for Canal 2.

In 2001, XHTV began using the name 4TV with a program lineup targeted at the Mexico City area; from January 2003 it adopted a new logo and the slogan El Canal de la Ciudad (The City Channel). For the 2009-2010 season of the channel, its morning program Matutino Express increased its length by one hour and Ellas con estrellas moved to an 11am timeslot. Its former late afternoon slot was filled by canned programming.

On August 30, 2010 (sixty years after the channel was founded), the channel's name was changed to FOROtv (literally "Forum TV"), with most of Televisa's news programs moved here, such as Las Noticias por Adela (from XEQ), and with new news and talk programs being created. Prior to this, the channel, under the name of Canal de la Ciudad ("The City's Channel"), broadcast programs targeted at Mexico City's metro area, as well as reruns of American series and blocks of Mexican movies.

Under this format, the channel seeks to emulate the success achieved by its predecessor ECO (which operated from 1988 to 2001). It competes in a crowded cable news space with such channels as TV Azteca's adn40 and Azteca Noticias, Telefórmula, Efekto TV, CNN en Español, Excélsior TV, and Milenio Televisión, among others.

== Technical information ==
=== Subchannels ===
The station's signal is multiplexed:

Subchannels of XHTV-TDT
Subchannel	Res.	Short name	Programming
4.1	1080i	XHTV	FORO
4.2	480i	XHTV	CV Shopping

=== Analog-to-digital conversion ===
XHTV, along with other Mexico City TV stations, shut off its analog signal on VHF channel 4, on December 17, 2015, at midnight, as part of the federally mandated transition from analog to digital television. The station's digital signal remained on its pre-transition UHF channel 49, using virtual channel 4.

In October 2016, XHTV added shopping channel CJ Grand Shopping as subchannel 4.2; this channel was deleted in March 2019 and replaced in June with a new CV Shopping channel wholly owned by Televisa.

On November 3, 2018, XHTV relocated from channel 49 to 15 to allow the 600 MHz band to be used for mobile services. It was the last station to repack in Mexico City.

== See also ==
- Noticieros Televisa
