= Inspector Hornleigh Intervenes =

German television series

- Genre: Crime drama
- Created by: Hans Wolfgang Priwin
- Written by: Hans Wolfgang Priwin
- Directed by: Hermann Pfeiffer
- Starring: Helmut Peine; Wolfgang Forester; Horst Breitkreuz; Paul Klinger
- Country of origin: West Germany
- Original language: German
- No. of series: 1
- No. of episodes: 4

Production
- Producer: Hermann Pfeiffer
- Cinematography: Bruno Stephan
- Editor: Alexandra Anatra
- Production company: Westdeutscher Rundfunk

Original release
- Network: ARD
- Release: 26 May – 4 August 1961

Inspector Hornleigh Intervenes (German: Inspektor Hornleigh greift ein...) is a 1961 West German crime television series broadcast on WDR in four episodes. It is based on the fictional Scotland Yard detective Inspector Hornleigh, who had previously appeared in British radio and film series. The episodes were scripted by Hans Wolfgang Priwin, who had previously co-written the BBC radio series but was a German by birth. The sets were designed by the art director Alfred Bütow.

Helmut Peine played Hornleigh, while Wolfgang Forester played his sidekick Sergeant Bingham. Paul Klinger hosted each episode. Other actors appearing in the series included Horst Breitkreuz, Siegfried Wischnewski, Alf Marholm and Joachim Teege.

The four episodes were Der Mann aus Tanganjika, Der Schuß fiel gegenüber, Zwei Stühle mit Vergangenheit and Mord ohne Motiv.

== Bibliography ==
- Ingrid Brück, Andrea Guder, Reinhold Viehoff & Karin When. Der deutsche Fernsehkrimi: Eine Programm- und Produktionsgeschichte von den Anfängen bis heute. Springer-Verlag, 2017.
- Martin Compart. Crime TV: Lexikon der Krimi-Serien. Bertz + Fischer, 2000.
