= S. J. Warmington =

English actor (1884–1941)

Stanley James Warmington
- S. J. Warmington in Murder! (1930)
- Born: 16 December 1884; Hertfordshire, England
- Died: 10 May 1941 (aged 56); London, England
- Occupation: Actor

Stanley James Warmington (16 December 1884 – 10 May 1941), or just S. J. Warmington, was an English actor who appeared on film, stage, radio, and television in the early 20th century.

== Life and career ==
Warmington was born in Hertfordshire, England on 16 December 1884. Warmington studied for the stage at the Royal Academy of Dramatic Art after working as a journalist. Beginning in the 1910s he appeared in numerous stage productions in West End theatre in London and Broadway theatre in New York City. In 1919 Warmington landed his first cinematic role in the silent film Wisp o' the Woods and he went on to play supporting roles, typically a detective or police officer, in some of Alfred Hitchcock’s earliest films including Sabotage, The 39 Steps, The Man Who Knew Too Much, and Murder!. In the late 1930s Warmington gained national fame for playing the title role in the BBC radio drama Inspector Hornleigh Investigates. In 1939 Warmington also acted in some of the earliest made-for-TV films. In 1934 Warmington married film and stage actress Ms. Victoria Olga Edwine Slade (b. 1891 – d. 1949)

== Warmington’s death ==
S. J. Warmington was killed at the age of 56 during the Second World War when the German Luftwaffe intentionally bombed residential areas in Great Britain. On the evening of 10 May 1941 Warmington was in bed at his home, Number 39, Elvaston Place, in Kensington, London, when his neighbourhood was showered with incendiary bombs. Warmington, a volunteer Fire Guard, went out to help extinguish the resulting fires and was amongst those killed, at Number 22, when a high-explosive bomb fell. The civilian casualties from the bombing campaign lasting more than a year were high, with tens of thousands killed and injured. Warmington's death received a minor mention in The Times.

== Filmography ==
- 1919: A Smart Set – Herbert Sterne
- 1919: Wisp o' the Woods – James Whitmore
- 1920: The Amateur Wife – Randolph Ferguson
- 1928: A South Sea Bubble – Frank Sullivan
- 1930: Murder! – Bennett
- 1930: Escape! – Warder
- 1931: The Calendar
- 1932: The Crooked Lady – Inspector Hilton
- 1934: The Man Who Knew Too Much – Rawlings – Gang Member (uncredited)
- 1935: The 39 Steps – Scotland Yard Man (uncredited)
- 1936: Sabotage – Hollingshead
- 1939: Bees on the Boat-Deck (TV Movie)
- 1939: The Little Father of the Wilderness (TV Movie) – Captain Chevillon (final film role)

== Stage performances ==
- March 1920 – King Richard III as Sir William Catesby at Plymouth Theatre in New York.
- February 1920 – Trimmed in Scarlet as Charles Knight at Maxine Elliott's Theatre in New York.
- October 1914 – My Lady's Dress at the Playhouse Theatre in New York.
