= Phyllis Calvert =

English film actress (1915–2002)

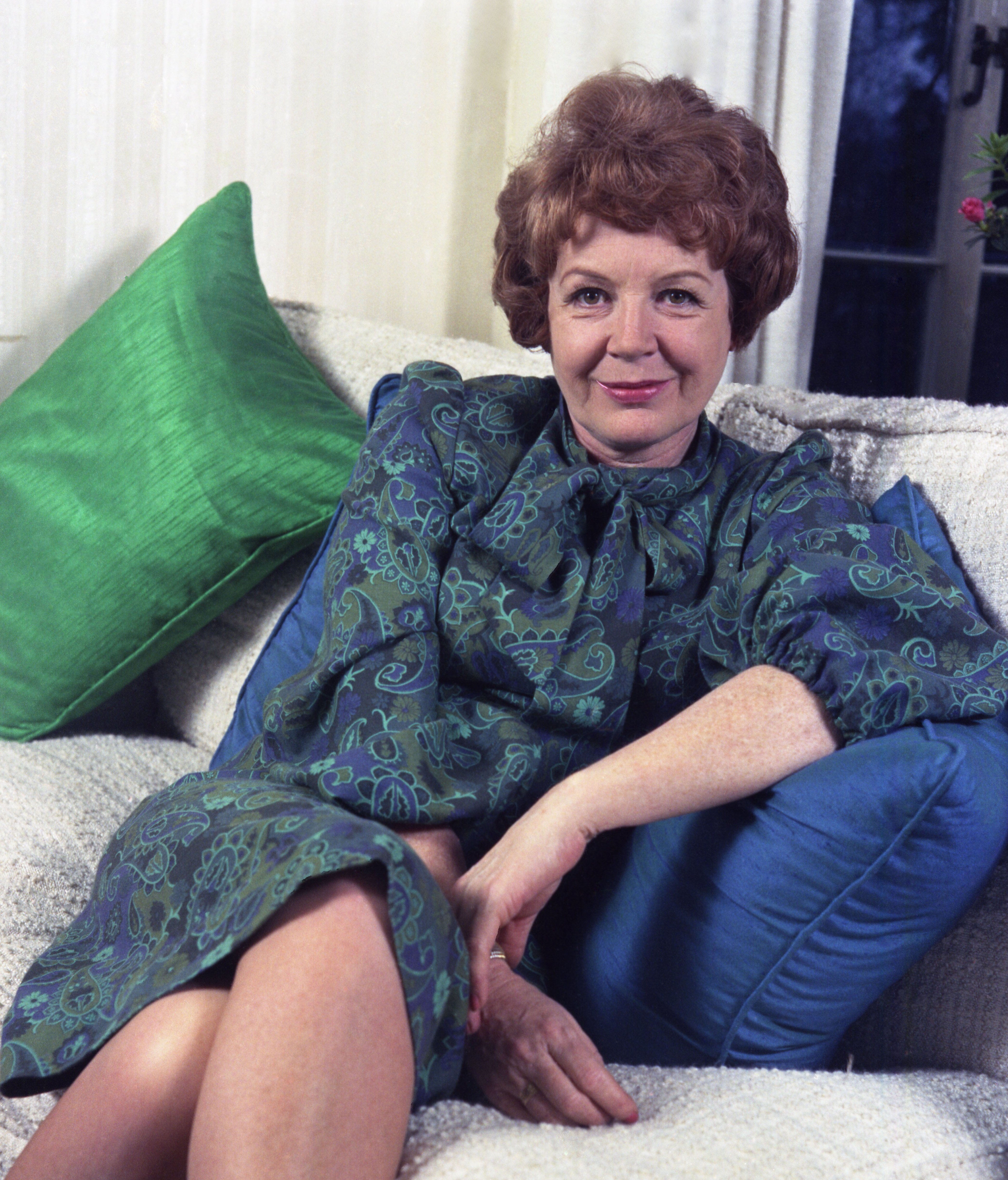
- Calvert in 1974
- Born: Phyllis Hannah Bickle; 18 February 1915; Chelsea, London, England
- Died: 8 October 2002 (aged 87); London, England
- Education: Royal Central School of Speech and Drama
- Years active: 1927–2000
- Spouse: Peter Murray-Hill (m. 1941; died 1957)
- Children: 2

Phyllis Hannah Murray-Hill (née Bickle; 18 February 1915 – 8 October 2002), known professionally as Phyllis Calvert, was an English actress. She was one of the leading stars of the Gainsborough melodramas of the 1940s such as The Man in Grey (1943) and was one of the most popular movie stars in Britain in the 1940s. She continued her acting career for another 50 years.

In the words of an article by Michael Brooke for the BFI's Screenonline website: "Most of the time she drew what looked like the short straw, playing the 'good girl' in films that revelled in the exploits of her wicked opposite number, and it says much for her talent and charisma that she was able to hold attention in what must have seemed thankless parts – she herself acknowledged that 'I do think it is much more difficult to establish a really charming, nice person than a wicked one – and make it real'."

== Biography ==
Calvert was born on 18 February 1915 in Chelsea, London, and trained at the Margaret Morris School of Dancing. She began performing from the age of ten, appearing with Ellen Terry in Crossings. She gained her first film role at the age of 12, in The Arcadians (1927), also known as The Land of Heart's Desire.

Calvert performed in repertory theatre in Malvern and Coventry. She made her London stage debut in A Woman's Privilege in 1939. Her early films include Two Days to Live (1939).

=== Gainsborough Pictures ===
Calvert was spotted in a play Punch without Judy, and was signed to a contract by Gainsborough Pictures which gave her the lead in They Came by Night (1940), opposite Will Fyffe. She was George Formby's love interest in Let George Do It! (1940) and had a support part in Charley's (Big-Hearted) Aunt (1940), starring Arthur Askey. Calvert was championed by the head of Gainsborough, Ted Black.

Calvert was in a war movie, Neutral Port (1940), then had a good role as Michael Redgrave's love interest in Kipps (1941), directed by Carol Reed. After a detective film Inspector Hornleigh Goes To It (1941) she had the co-lead in Uncensored (1942), a war movie with Eric Portman. Reed used her again in The Young Mr. Pitt (1942), playing Eleanor Eden.

In 1942, she had the lead role as Patricia Graham in the West End production of Terence Rattigan's play Flare Path.

=== Stardom ===
Calvert was by now well established in British films. She did not become a star, however, until given one of the four leading roles in the Gainsborough melodrama The Man in Grey (1943). The movie was a huge success, making her and her three co-stars – Stewart Granger, James Mason and Margaret Lockwood – genuine box office stars in Britain.

Calvert followed it with Fanny by Gaslight (1944), co-starring Granger and Mason, which was another big hit. Also popular was Two Thousand Women (1944), made by Launder and Gilliat, about British women interned in occupied France. It co-starred Patricia Roc, who appeared with Calvert and Granger in Madonna of the Seven Moons (1945), another Gainsborough melodrama, and another hit. Calvert's successful run at the box office continued when she and Mason were reunited in They Were Sisters (1945), a more contemporary-set Gainsborough melodrama. Exhibitors voted her the fifth-most popular star of 1945 in Britain.

She was one of Stewart Granger's loves in The Magic Bow (1946), a biopic about Niccolo Paganini, and had the female lead in a drama about colonialism in Africa Men of Two Worlds (1946), made a few years before being released. It was a success, though not profitable because of its high cost. The Root of All Evil (1947) was one of the last of the Gainsborough melodramas. She was voted the sixth most popular British star at the box office in 1946.

=== Hollywood ===
Calvert's success had been noticed in the US, although her films had not been as popular there. Universal-International signed her to star in Time Out of Mind (1947), which was a box office disappointment. She received several offers from studios and eventually decided to sign a six-picture deal with Paramount.

She returned to Britain to make Broken Journey (1948) playing a role written especially for her, but the film failed at the box-office.

Calvert went to Hollywood to make two films, both for Paramount: My Own True Love (1949), with Melvyn Douglas, and Appointment with Danger (1951 but made two years earlier) with Alan Ladd, in which she played a nun. She did Peter Pan on stage in Britain.

=== Producer ===
Back in Britain she made two films with director Ladislao Vajda, neither particularly successful: Golden Madonna (1950), shot in Italy, and The Woman with No Name (1950). She invested her own money in the latter. She wanted to produce other films: Eastward Ho, about an Englishwoman who romances a cowboy, and Equilibrium, about a trapeze artist, as well as star in a third film for Paramount but none of these were made.

Calvert was in a thriller Mr. Denning Drives North (1951) with John Mills and a BBC TV production The Holly and the Ivy (1951). She had her first big hit in a while, Mandy (1952).

Calvert was a wife in The Net (1953), then was off screen for a while. She acted on stage in It's Never Too Late (1956), then appeared in the film version. She followed it with Child in the House (1956).

On TV she was in Strindberg's The Father for ITV's Television Playhouse, and played the lead in Tatiana, the Czar's Daughter. She also played Mrs March in a six-part BBC adaptation of Little Women.

Calvert had a support part in the Hollywood-financed Indiscreet (1958), then played a concerned mother in The Young and the Guilty (1958) and a wacky spinster in A Lady Mislaid (1959). On TV she was in "The Break" for Armchair Theatre (1959) and played Katharine O'Shea in Parnell for Play of the Week (1959), then reprised her role as Mrs March for the BBC in Good Wives (1959). She was Constance Wilde in Oscar Wilde (1960) with Robert Morley and A Righteous Woman on Play of the Week (1962).

The only time people recall Calvert risking loss of sympathy for an apparent lapse of taste, grace or charm was during her stage career at the Lyric in 1963, and at the Duke of York's in 1964. In the first, as the wife in Ronald Duncan's Ménage à Trois, she condoned his misconduct – as long as it took place off the premises, herself departing as a lesbian with his mistress as the curtain fell. Then, as the cold, insensitive stepmother in James Saunders's A Scent Of Flowers, she left no trace of "the rose that sings". Phyllis Calvert

=== Later career ===
In all, Calvert acted in over 40 films, her later work including The Battle of the Villa Fiorita (1965), Twisted Nerve (1968), Oh! What a Lovely War (1969) and The Walking Stick (1970).

From 1970 to 1972, she starred in her own TV series, Kate, playing the part of an agony aunt with problems of her own. The series was a moderate success.

She made TV appearances in programmes such as Crown Court, Ladykillers, Tales of the Unexpected, Boon, After Henry, Victoria Wood and Limelight: The Film Years – The Lime Grove Story. She also played D.I. Barnaby's Aunt Alice (Alice Bly) in a Midsomer Murders episode, "Blue Herrings", in 2000. She was the subject of This Is Your Life in 1972 when she was surprised by Eamonn Andrews. In 1993, Calvert had a small uncredited role as the Old Lady in the comedy series Mr. Bean in the episode "Mr. Bean in Room 426".

== Personal life ==
She was married to the actor and antiquarian bookseller Peter Murray-Hill until his sudden death in 1957. The couple had two children, Ann Murray-Hill (born 1943) and Piers Murray-Hill (born 1954). Calvert never remarried. She died in her sleep in London in 2002 from natural causes, aged 87.

== Partial filmography ==
- The Arcadians (1927) – Young Girl (uncredited)
- Discord (1933) – (uncredited)
- Anne One Hundred (1933) – (uncredited)
- School for Stars (1935) – (uncredited)
- They Came by Night (1940) – Sally
- Let George Do It! (1940) – Mary Wilson
- Charley's (Big-Hearted) Aunt (1940) – Betty Forsythe
- Neutral Port (1940) – Helen Carter
- Kipps (1941) – Ann Pornick – as a woman
- Inspector Hornleigh Goes To It (1941) – Mrs. Wilkinson
- Uncensored (1942) – Julie Lanvin
- The Young Mr. Pitt (1942) – Eleanor Eden
- The Man in Grey (1943) – Clarissa Marr
- Fanny by Gaslight (1944) – Fanny
- Two Thousand Women (1944) – Freda Thompson
- Madonna of the Seven Moons (1945) – Maddalena
- They Were Sisters (1945) – Lucy Moore
- The Magic Bow (1946) – Jeanne de Vermond
- Men of Two Worlds (1946) – Dr. Caroline Munro
- The Root of All Evil (1947) – Jeckie Farnish
- Time Out of Mind (1947) – Kate Fernald
- Broken Journey (1948) – Mary Johnstone
- My Own True Love (1949) – Joan Clews
- Golden Madonna (1949) – Patricia Chandler
- The Woman with No Name (1950) – Yvonne Winter
- Appointment with Danger (1951) – Sister Augustine
- Mr. Denning Drives North (1951) – Kay Denning
- Mandy (1952) – Christine
- The Net (1953) – Lydia Heathley
- It's Never Too Late (1956) – Laura Hammond
- Child in the House (1956) – Evelyn Acheson
- Indiscreet (1958) – Mrs. Margaret Munson
- The Young and the Guilty (1958) – Gladys Connor
- A Lady Mislaid (1958) – Esther Williams
- Oscar Wilde (1960) – Constance Wilde
- The Battle of the Villa Fiorita (1965) – Margot
- Twisted Nerve (1968) – Enid Durnley
- Oh! What a Lovely War (1969) – Lady Dorothy Haig
- The Walking Stick (1970) – Erica Dainton
- Lady Killers (1981) – Rosaline Fox
- Mr. Bean (1993) – Old Woman
- Mrs Dalloway (1997) – Aunt Helena
- Midsomer Murders (2000) – Alice Bly

== Box office ranking ==
For a number of years, British film exhibitors voted her among the top ten British stars at the box office via an annual poll in the Motion Picture Herald.

- 1944 – 8th
- 1945 – 5th
- 1946 – 6th
