= Persons Unknown (play) =

1929 play by Edgar Wallace

- Written by: Edgar Wallace
- Original language: English
- Genre: Mystery

Premiere
- Date premiered: 8 May 1929

Persons Unknown is a 1929 mystery play by the British writer Edgar Wallace. The plot revolves around the murder of a "person unknown" in a street by a mysterious blackmailer. It features the character of Sergeant Elk, a Scotland Yard detective who appeared in several of Wallace's novels.

Its original run lasted for 108 performances, from 8 May 1929 to 10 August 1929, at London's Shaftesbury Theatre. The cast included Gordon Harker and Minnie Rayner.

== Bibliography ==
- Kabatchnik, Amnon. Blood on the Stage, 1975-2000: Milestone Plays of Crime, Mystery, and Detection : an Annotated Repertoire. Rowman & Littlefield, 2012.
- Wearing, J. P. The London Stage 1920-1929: A Calendar of Productions, Performers, and Personnel. Rowman & Littlefield, 2014.
