= Helmut Peine =

German film

- Born: 5 May 1902; Magdeburg, German Empire
- Died: 28 August 1970 (aged 68); Düsseldorf, West Germany
- Occupation: Actor
- Years active: 1950-1969 (film & TV)

Helmut Peine (1902–1970) was a German film, radio and television actor.

In 1961 he played the title role in the four-part television crime series Inspector Hornleigh Intervenes.

== Selected filmography ==
- Only One Night (1950)
- Professor Nachtfalter (1951)
- Sensation in San Remo (1951)
- Poison in the Zoo (1952)
- Operation Sleeping Bag (1955)
- Made in Germany (1957)
- Die Schlüssel (1965, TV miniseries)
- The Investigation (1966, TV film)

== Bibliography ==
- Martin Compart. Crime TV: Lexikon der Krimi-Serien. Bertz + Fischer, 2000.
