= Inspector Hornleigh Goes To It =

1941 film by Walter Forde

Inspector Hornleigh Goes to It
- Directed by: Walter Forde
- Written by: Val Guest; Frank Launder; J. O. C. Orton; Hans Wolfgang Priwin (radio series)
- Produced by: Edward Black (producer)
- Starring: Gordon Harker; Alastair Sim; Phyllis Calvert; Edward Chapman
- Cinematography: Jack E. Cox; Arthur Crabtree
- Edited by: R. E. Dearing
- Music by: Louis Levy (uncredited); Charles Williams (uncredited)
- Release date: 5 May 1941 (UK)
- Running time: 87 minutes
- Country: United Kingdom
- Language: English

Inspector Hornleigh Goes To It (U.S. title: Mail Train) is a 1941 British detective film directed by Walter Forde and starring Gordon Harker, Alastair Sim, Phyllis Calvert and Edward Chapman. It was written by J.O.C. Orton and Val Guest based on a story by Frank Launder, and was the third and final film adaptation of the Inspector Hornleigh stories. It was released in America by 20th-Century Fox.

== Plot summary ==
Hornleigh and Sergeant Bingham join the army in an effort to uncover a ring of German spies.

== Cast ==
- Gordon Harker as Inspector Hornleigh
- Alastair Sim as Sergeant Bingham
- Phyllis Calvert as Mrs. Wilkinson
- Edward Chapman as Mr. Blenkinsop
- Charles Oliver as Dr. Wilkinson
- Raymond Huntley as Dr. Kerbishley
- Percy Walsh as Inspector Blow
- David Horne as Commissioner
- Peter Gawthorne as Colonel
- Wally Patch as Sergeant Major
- Betty Jardine as Daisy
- O. B. Clarence as Professor Mackenzie
- John Salew as Mr. Tomboy
- Cyril Cusack as postal sorter
- Bill Shine as hotel porter
- Sylvia Cecil
- Edward Underdown
- Marie Makine
- Richard Cooper

== Soundtrack ==
- "The Beer Barrel Polka" (written by Lew Brown, Wladimir A. Timm, Jaromir Vejvoda & Vasek Zeman)
- "Jungle Lullaby" (written by Art Noel, Don Pelosi and John Rivers)

== Reception ==
The Monthly Film Bulletin wrote: "Though the plot is a little far-fetched, it is easy to overlook this when one is confronted by the spectacle of Gordon Harker impersonating a history master, or Alastair Sim as a dentist's assistant, taking out two teeth instead of one from an infuriated patient. The film gives both these actors fine scope for their particular brand of humour with the ever-resourceful Hornleigh constantly righting the wrongs perpetrated by the well-meaning Sergeant. The rest of the cast back up well and are cleverly directed. O. B. Clarence gives a complete and very amusing little character study in his part of Professor Mackenzie."

Kine Weekly wrote: "The film is responsible for grand popular entertainment. Its secret is the way in which it distributes the laughs without robbing salient situations of essential suspense. The comedy highlights, in the army, Bingham as a dentist, Hornleigh as a schoolmaster and as post-office sorter, are cunningly made the stepping stone to sterner stuff. An exciting climax seals the cast-iron show. ... Ingenious story, neat dramatic twists, grand comedy situations, great teamwork by Harker and Sim, versatile supporting cast, good atmosphere, thrilling climax and big title and star values."
