= Niebla (TV series) =

1961 Mexican telenovela

- Genre: Telenovela
- Created by: Marissa Garrido
- Directed by: José Morris
- Starring: Amparo Rivelles; Ernesto Alonso
- Country of origin: Mexico
- Original language: Spanish

Production
- Executive producer: Ernesto Alonso

Original release
- Network: XHTV-TV (Telesistema Mexicano)
- Release: 1961

Niebla (English: Fog) is a Mexican telenovela produced by Televisa and broadcast by Telesistema Mexicano in 1961. It was the last telenovela to be produced for Canal 4 (XHTV). Later telenovelas were produced for Canal 2.

== Cast ==
- Amparo Rivelles
- Ernesto Alonso
- Prudencia Griffel
- Susana Cabrera
- Luis Bayardo
- Bertha Moss
- Judy Ponte
- Jana Kleinburg
- Ramón Bugarini
