= Gordon Harker =

English film actor (1885–1967)

- Born: William Gordon Harker; 7 August 1885; Wandsworth, London, England
- Died: 2 March 1967 (aged 81); London, England
- Occupation: Actor
- Years active: 1902–1959
- Parents: Joseph Harker (father); Sarah Elizabeth Hall (mother)

William Gordon Harker (7 August 1885 – 2 March 1967) was an English stage and film actor.

Harker was one of the sons of Sarah Elizabeth Harker, née Hall, (1856–1927), and Joseph Harker (1855–1927), a much admired theatrical set painter, after whom the Dracula character Jonathan Harker was named.

Harker had a long career on the stage, from 1902 to the 1950s. In addition, he appeared in 68 films between 1921 and 1959, including three silent films directed by Alfred Hitchcock and in several scenes in Elstree Calling (1930), a revue film co-directed by Hitchcock. He was known for his performance as Inspector Hornleigh in a trilogy of films produced between 1938 and 1940, as well in Saloon Bar (1940), based on the stage play he had starred in and another one of his stage successes The Poltergeist made into the film Things Happen at Night (1947), a poltergeist comedy he co-starred in with Alfred Drayton and Robertson Hare. His last major screen role was as the wily waiter Albert in the 1957 motion picture version of Small Hotel.

== Filmography ==
- General John Regan (1921)
- The Ring (1927)
- The Farmer's Wife (1928)
- Champagne (1928)
- The Flying Scotsman (1929)
- The Wrecker (1929)
- Taxi for Two (1929)
- The Crooked Billet (1929)
- The Return of the Rat (1929)
- Elstree Calling (1930)
- The Squeaker (1930)
- The W Plan (1930)
- Escape (1930)
- The Professional Guest (1931, short)
- Shadows (1931)
- The Stronger Sex (1931)
- Third Time Lucky (1931)
- The Ringer (1931)
- The Sport of Kings (1931)
- The Calendar (1931)
- The Man They Couldn't Arrest (1931)
- Love on Wheels (1932)
- The Frightened Lady (1932)
- The Lucky Number (1932)
- Rome Express (1932)
- White Face (1932)
- Condemned to Death (1932)
- This Is the Life (1933)
- Britannia of Billingsgate (1933)
- Friday the Thirteenth (1933)
- Road House (1934)
- Dirty Work (1934)
- My Old Dutch (1934)
- Admirals All (1935)
- The Lad (1935)
- Boys Will Be Boys (1935)
- The Phantom Light (1935)
- Hyde Park Corner (1935)
- Squibs (1935)
- The Story of Papworth, the Village of Hope (1935, short)
- Wolf's Clothing (1936)
- Two's Company (1936)
- The Amateur Gentleman (1936)
- Millions (1937)
- Beauty and the Barge (1937)
- The Frog (1937)
- Lightning Conductor (1938)
- Blondes for Danger (1938)
- No Parking (1938)
- The Return of the Frog (1938)
- Inspector Hornleigh (1938)
- Inspector Hornleigh on Holiday (1939)
- Saloon Bar (1940)
- Channel Incident (1940, short)
- Inspector Hornleigh Goes To It (1941)
- Once a Crook (1941)
- Warn That Man (1943)
- 29 Acacia Avenue (1945)
- Things Happen at Night (1947)
- Her Favourite Husband (1950)
- The Second Mate (1950)
- Derby Day (1952)
- Bang! You're Dead (1954)
- Out of the Clouds (1955)
- A Touch of the Sun (1956)
- Small Hotel (1957)
- Left Right and Centre (1959)

== Selected stage roles ==
- London Life (1924)
- The Combined Maze (1927)
- Suspense (1930)
- Road House (1932)
- Afterwards (1933)
- Saloon Bar (1939)
- Warn That Man! (1941)
