= Alastair Sim =

Scottish actor (1900–1976)

Alastair Sim CBE
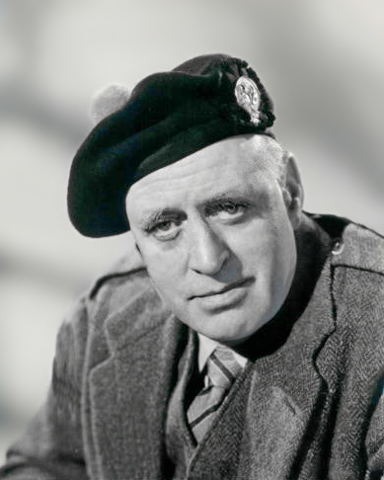
- Sim as the Laird in Geordie, 1955
- Born: Alastair George Bell Sim; 9 October 1900; Edinburgh, Scotland
- Died: 19 August 1976 (aged 75); London, England
- Education: University of Edinburgh
- Occupation: Actor
- Years active: 1930–1976
- Spouse: Naomi Plaskitt (m. 1932)
- Children: 1

Alastair George Bell Sim (9 October 1900 – 19 August 1976) was a Scottish actor. He began his theatrical career at the age of thirty and quickly became established as a popular West End performer, remaining so until his death in 1976. Starting in 1935, he also appeared in more than fifty British films, including an iconic adaptation of Charles Dickens' novella A Christmas Carol, released in 1951 as Scrooge in Great Britain and as A Christmas Carol in the United States. Though an accomplished dramatic actor, he is often remembered for his comically sinister performances.

After a series of false starts, including a spell as a jobbing labourer and another as a clerk in a local government office, Sim's love of and talent for poetry reading won him several prizes and led to his appointment as a lecturer in elocution at the University of Edinburgh in 1925. He also ran his own private elocution and drama school, from which, with the help of the playwright John Drinkwater, he made the transition to the professional stage in 1930.

Despite his late start, Sim soon became well known on the London stage. A period of more than a year as a member of the Old Vic company brought him wide experience of playing Shakespeare and other classics, to which he returned throughout his career. In the modern repertoire, he formed a close professional association with the author James Bridie, which lasted from 1939 until the dramatist's death in 1951. Sim not only acted in Bridie's works but also directed them.

In the later 1940s and for most of the 1950s, Sim was a leading star of British cinema. His films included Green for Danger (1946), Hue and Cry (1947), The Happiest Days of Your Life (1950), Scrooge (1951), The Belles of St. Trinian's (1954) and An Inspector Calls (1954). Later, he made fewer films and generally concentrated on stage work, including successful productions at the Chichester Festival and regular appearances in new and old works in the West End.

== Early life ==
Sim was born in Edinburgh, the youngest child and second son of Alexander Sim, a ladies' tailor and clothier who served on several Edinburgh committees and was a school governor and justice of the peace, and Isabella (née McIntyre). His mother moved to Edinburgh as a teenager from Eigg, one of the Small Isles in the Hebrides, and was a native Gaelic speaker. The family lived above his father's shop at 96–98, Lothian Road; later, improved finances allowed for a move to 73, Viewforth, in the wealthier Bruntsfield area of the city. Sim was educated at Bruntsfield Primary school, and received his secondary education at James Gillespie's High School and George Heriot's School. He worked—probably part time (Note: In her memoirs, Sim's widow, Naomi, wrote that he worked after leaving school at fourteen; in his 2011 biography of Sim, Mark Simpson questions this, observing that Sim took his Intermediate School Certificate at the age of sixteen)—in his father's shop and then for the men's outfitters Gieve's, displaying no talent for the retail trade. In 1918 he was admitted to the University of Edinburgh to study analytical chemistry, but was called up for army training.

After the end of the First World War in November 1918, Sim was released from military service. On his return home, he told his family that he did not intend to resume his studies at the university but instead would become an actor. His announcement was so badly received that he left the parental home and spent about a year in the Scottish Highlands with a group of itinerant jobbing workers. Returning to Edinburgh, he took a post in the burgh assessor's office. In his spare time, he joined poetry reading classes, winning the gold medal for verse speaking at the Edinburgh Music Festival. This led to his engagement to teach elocution at a further education college in Dalry, Edinburgh. He held this post from 1922 to 1924. After taking an advanced training course in his subject, in 1925 he successfully applied to the University of Edinburgh for the post of Fulton Lecturer in Elocution, which he held for five years.

While maintaining his university position, Sim also taught private pupils and later founded and ran his own drama school for children in Edinburgh. This developed his skills as a director and occasional actor. One of his pupils, Naomi Merlith Plaskitt, aged 12 when they met, became his wife six years later. The dramatist John Drinkwater saw one of Sim's productions for the school and encouraged him to become a professional actor. Through Drinkwater's influence, Sim was cast in his first professional production, Othello at the Savoy Theatre, London, in 1930; he understudied the three principal male roles (played by Paul Robeson, Maurice Browne and Ralph Richardson) and played the small role of the messenger.

== Early stage and screen career ==
Sim followed Othello with productions ranging from a musical revue to a medieval costume drama by Clifford Bax, in whose The Venetian he made his Broadway debut in October 1931. In 1932–33 he was engaged for sixteen months as a member of the Old Vic company, headed by Peggy Ashcroft. He performed in ten plays by Shakespeare, two each by Shaw and Drinkwater, and one by Sheridan. He began to attract the attention of reviewers. The Times said that in As You Like It Sim as Duke Senior and George Devine as Duke Frederick "endowed the dukes with the properly fabulous touch of fairyland". In The Observer, Ivor Brown wrote that Sim's Claudius in Hamlet had "a sly roguishness that was immensely alive." During the Old Vic season, Sim married his former pupil, Naomi Plaskitt, on 2 August 1932. They had one daughter, Merlith Naomi.

For several months in 1934, Sim was incapacitated by a slipped disc, which was successfully treated by osteopathy. When he recovered, he made a strong impression on West End audiences as Ponsonby, a sycophantic bank director in the comedy Youth at the Helm. Ivor Brown called his performance "a joy … a marvellous mixture of soap and vinegar". On the strength of this success Sim was cast in his first film, The Riverside Murder (1935), in the role of the earnest but dim Sergeant McKay. There followed a sequence of films, a mixture of comedies and detective stories, including Wedding Group (1936), in which Sim and his wife both appeared, he as a Scottish minister, she as the maid; Edgar Wallace's The Squeaker (1937), after a stage production of the same piece; Alf's Button Afloat (1938) with the Crazy Gang; also in 1938 he played a revengeful ex-con Soapy Marks in the Associated British Picture film The Terror, and the "Inspector Hornleigh" series (1939–41), as the bumbling assistant of Gordon Harker.

== Starring roles ==
Sim returned to substantial stage roles at the last Malvern Festival; in James Bridie's comedy What Say They? he played Professor Hayman, making him, as The Manchester Guardian put it, "baleful as a shaven John Knox and lean as a buzzard… a grand performance". This was the start of an association between Sim and Bridie that lasted until the latter's death in 1951, with Sim starring in, and directing, Holy Isle (1942), Mr Bolfry (1943), The Forrigan Reel (1945), Dr Angelus (1947) and Mr Gillie (1950).

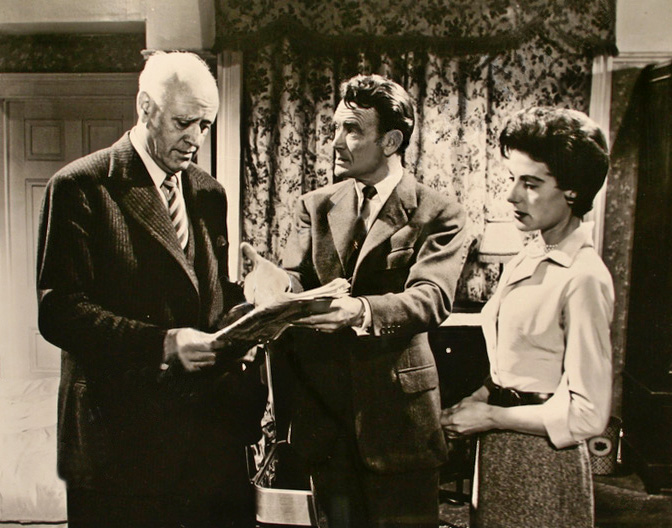
With John Mills and Yvonne Mitchell in the comedy-thriller Escapade, 1955

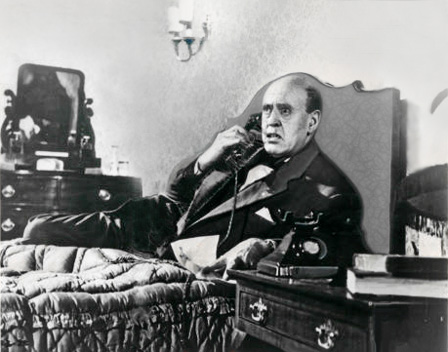
As Hawkins, the assassin, in The Green Man, 1956

By the mid-1940s, Sim was being cast in starring roles in films. His earliest successes as a leading man included the police detective in the thriller Green for Danger (1946); the headmaster of Nutbourne College, co-starring with Margaret Rutherford, in the farcical comedy The Happiest Days of Your Life (1950); and a writer of lurid crime fiction in the comedy Laughter in Paradise (1951). His other films included Waterloo Road (1944), London Belongs to Me (1948), Alfred Hitchcock's Stage Fright (1950), Scrooge (A Christmas Carol) (1951), Folly to Be Wise (1953) and An Inspector Calls (1954).

Sim turned down the role of Joseph Macroon in Whisky Galore! (1949), saying, "I can't bear professional Scotsmen". An even more central role for which he was intended was the mad criminal mastermind Professor Marcus in The Ladykillers (1955). The role was written with him in mind but was finally taken by Alec Guinness, who, in the words of Mark Duguid of the British Film Institute, played it "with more than a hint of Sim about him", to the extent that according to Simpson many people thought then and still think that Sim played the part.

Sim's performance in Scrooge (1951) is considered by many to be the best portrayal of the title character on screen, and it is among his best-known film roles, particularly in the U.S. (Note: The American critic Greg Ferrara wrote, "Although there will always be dispute over which is Alastair Sim's finest screen performance, there's little doubt as to which is the best known. His 1951 characterisation of Charles Dickens' notorious curmudgeon Ebenezer Scrooge is ... generally regarded as definitive", and in 2002 John Corry of The American Spectator called the film "the gold standard by which all the other versions must be judged: the 1951 film in which Alastair Sim, as Scrooge, gives the performance of his career". In Sim's own country he was at least as celebrated for other film roles: in The Oxford Dictionary of National Biography, Michael Gilbert identifies Sim's harassed headmaster in The Happiest Days of Your Life as "the fondest memory for many". and in 2005, Michael Brooke wrote in the British Film Institute's Sight and Sound, "The St Trinian's films may be the first we think of, but Alastair Sim was a vastly versatile actor without whom the landscape of British cinema's heyday would be a less joyful place." Brooke describes Sim's Scrooge as the "unimpeachably definitive" cinema portrayal.) In the farcical The Belles of St. Trinian's (1954) he played the dual roles of Millicent and Clarence Fritton, the headmistress of St Trinian's and her shady brother. Having originally accepted the part of Clarence, Sim agreed to play in drag as Miss Fritton when Margaret Rutherford proved unavailable, and the director and co-producer, Frank Launder could find no suitable actress as an alternative. His "Burke and Hare" film The Anatomist debuted on British television (on "International Theatre") on 6 February 1956, and was later released theatrically in the U.S. in 1961, leading some reference sources to list it as a 1961 movie.

Sim was among the top British film stars of the early and mid 1950s, (Note: For a number of years in the 1950s, British film exhibitors voted him among the top ten local stars at the box office in an annual poll for the Motion Picture Herald: 1950 – equal eighth with Margaret Rutherford; 1951 – 6th; 1952 – 2nd; 1953 – 4th; 1955 – 4th (8th overall).) but his films of the late 1950s are considered by the critic Michael Brooke to be of lesser quality, because of poor scripts or lack of innovative direction. Sim made no films in the decade between 1961 and 1971; it is not clear whether this was, as Brooke suggests, because he found the scripts offered to him unacceptable or, as Simpson proposes, because film makers in the 1960s thought him unsuited to the kitchen sink dramas then fashionable.

After Bridie's death in 1951, Sim appeared in only two stage productions during the rest of the decade. The first was a revival of Bridie's Mr Bolfry in 1956, in which Sim moved from the role of the puritanical clergyman to that of the Devil. The second was William Golding's The Brass Butterfly, a 1958 comedy described by The Times as portraying the relations between an urbane Roman emperor (Sim) and a Greek inventor with wildly anachronistic scientific ideas (George Cole).

In 1959, Sim sued the food company H J Heinz over a television advertisement for its baked beans; the advertisement had a voiceover sounding remarkably like him, and he insisted that he would not "prostitute his art" by advertising anything. (Note: The voice was that of the actor Ron Moody, who regularly imitated Sim, along with many others, as part of Moody's stage act. Sim evidently bore Moody no ill will, and they appeared together in the 1975 revival of The Clandestine Marriage.) He lost the case and attracted some ridicule for his action, but he was conscious of the importance of his highly recognisable voice to his professional success. Brooke comments on Sim's "crowning glory: that extraordinary voice. Only Gielgud rivalled his tonal control and sensitivity to the musicality of the English language."

== 1960s and last years ==
After doing little stage work in the 1950s, Sim resumed his theatre career in earnest in the 1960s. His range was wide, from Prospero in The Tempest (1962) and Shylock in The Merchant of Venice (1964), to the villainous Captain Hook in Barrie's Peter Pan (1963, 1964 and 1968) and the hapless Mr Posket in Pinero's farce The Magistrate (1969). The new plays in which Sim appeared were Michael Gilbert's Windfall (1963), William Trevor's The Elephant's Foot (1965) and Ronald Millar's Number Ten (1967); he directed all three productions. The first was dismissed by The Times as a tepid comedy about a progressive young headmaster thwarted by a reactionary member of his staff; the second, billed as a pre-London tour, started and finished in the provinces; the last was castigated by Philip Hope-Wallace in The Guardian as "maladroit playmaking" with a tedious plot about political machinations. Sim's performances provided some consolation: in the first, The Times said, his "treacherously sweet smiles, triple takes and unheralded spasms of apoplectic fury almost make the evening worth while".

Much more successful among Sim's 1960s appearances were two productions at the Chichester Festival: Colman and Garrick's 1766 comedy The Clandestine Marriage (1966) and The Magistrate. In the former he co-starred once more with Rutherford, whom J. C. Trewin in The Illustrated London News praised for her "irresistible comic effect"; he thought Sim "enchantingly right". In the Pinero farce three years later, Trewin was equally approving of Sim and his co-star Patricia Routledge.

On television, Sim portrayed Mr Justice Swallow in the comedy series Misleading Cases (1967–71), written by A. P. Herbert, with Roy Dotrice as the litigious Mr Haddock over whose court cases Swallow presided with benign shrewdness. Sim returned to the cinema in 1971 as the voice of Scrooge in an animated adaptation of A Christmas Carol. The following year he appeared as the Bishop in Peter Medak's The Ruling Class (1972) with Peter O'Toole and he played a cameo in Richard Lester's Royal Flash (1975) with Malcolm McDowell. After playing Lord Harrogate in the 1976 Disney film Escape from the Dark, his last role was as the Earl in the 1976 remake of Rogue Male opposite Peter O'Toole, a role for which he literally climbed out of his sick bed, saying, "Peter needs me".

On stage Sim returned to Pinero farce, playing Augustin Jedd in Dandy Dick at Chichester and then in the West End. Once again he co-starred with Patricia Routledge. His last stage appearance was in a return to the role of Lord Ogleby in a new production of The Clandestine Marriage at the Savoy in April 1975.

== Personal life and honours ==
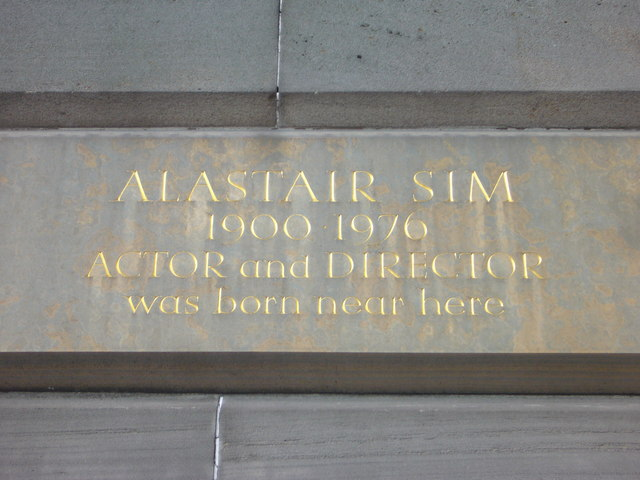
Memorial stone near Sim's birthplace, Lothian Road, Edinburgh

Sim and his family guarded their privacy carefully. He seldom gave press interviews and refused to sign autographs. In his view, the public's interest in him should be solely confined to his stage or screen performances. In a rare interview with the magazine Focus on Film he said, "I stand or fall in my profession by the public's judgement of my performances. No amount of publicity can dampen a good one or gloss over a bad one."

Sim and his wife Naomi promoted and encouraged young acting talent. Among their protégés was George Cole, who lived with them on and off from 1940, when he was 15 years old, until 1952, when he married and bought a house nearby. Cole appeared with Sim in eight films from Cottage to Let (1941), to Blue Murder at St Trinian's (1957). An obituary of Naomi Sim noted in 1999: "Cole wasn't the only youngster to benefit from the Sims' generosity and love of youthful spirits. At least half a dozen others – 'our boys' as Naomi called them – mostly unhappy at home, have cherished memories of life at Forrigan, the welcoming woodland retreat built by the couple near Henley-on-Thames in 1947". They had a daughter, Merlith, who lived at Forrigan with her family.

In 1948, Sim was elected Rector of the University of Edinburgh. He held the post until 1951; when he stood down he was made an honorary Doctor of Law. He was appointed CBE in 1953, and refused a knighthood in the early 1970s. An English Heritage blue plaque was unveiled in July 2008 at his former home at 8 Frognal Gardens, Hampstead, by his daughter Merlith McKendrick at a ceremony attended by George Cole. There is a plaque commemorating Sim's birth outside the Filmhouse Cinema in Lothian Road, Edinburgh.

Sim died in 1976, aged 75, in London, from complications of lung cancer. His widow Naomi published a memoir, Dance and Skylark: Fifty Years with Alastair Sim in 1987. She died on 3 August 1999.

== Notes and references ==
Notes

== Sources ==
- Gaye, Freda, ed. (1967). Who's Who in the Theatre (fourteenth ed.). London: Sir Isaac Pitman and Sons. OCLC 5997224.
- McArthur, Colin (2003). "Whiskey Galore!" and "The Maggie". New York: Tauris. ISBN 1417520396.
- Simpson, Mark (2009). Alastair Sim: The Star of "Scrooge" and "The Belles of St Trinian's". Stroud, UK: History Press. ISBN 978-0-7524-5372-9.

Academic offices
Preceded by Viscount Cunningham of Hyndhope	Rector of the University of Edinburgh; 1948–1951	Succeeded by Alexander Fleming
