= Gainsborough melodramas =

Group of films produced by Gainsborough Pictures

The Gainsborough melodramas were a sequence of films produced by the British film studio Gainsborough Pictures between 1943 and 1947 that conformed to a melodramatic style. The melodramas were not a film series but an unrelated sequence of films that had similar themes that were usually developed by the same film crew and frequently recurring actors who played similar characters in each. They were mostly based on popular books by female novelists and they encompassed costume dramas, such as The Man in Grey (1943) and The Wicked Lady (1945), and modern-dress dramas, such as Love Story (1944) and They Were Sisters (1945). The popularity of the films with audiences peaked in the mid-1940s, when cinema audiences consisted primarily of women. The influence of the films led to other British producers releasing similarly themed works, such as The Seventh Veil (1945), Pink String and Sealing Wax (1945), Hungry Hill (1947), The White Unicorn (1947), Idol of Paris (1948), and The Reluctant Widow (1950) and often with the talent that made Gainsborough melodramas successful.

== History ==
During the mid-1940s, with many of the men fighting in the Second World War, and many of the children evacuated to rural areas, women attained more financial responsibility and independence by having to work, and Gainsborough Pictures took advantage of this by providing films with powerful images of female independence and rebellion that resonated deeply with audiences. Maurice Ostrer, who was head of production at Gainsborough, pushed forward escapism, in contrast to Ealing's focus on the war, as he contended that the public did not need to see "patriotic war settings" for enjoyment, since many could find it "too near home", and that audiences wanted "good themes and good laughs".

Previously, Gainsborough had made films in a variety of genres during its twenty-five-year existence, and had been particularly known for its comedy films; however, with the advent of war, and the paying viewing public consisting mainly of women, the studio rapidly became closely associated with melodrama, to the extent that these films have become synonymous with the studios, in a manner resembling the Ealing comedies (1947–1957) and the Hammer Horrors (1955–1974). Gainsborough also produced other films during the war that featured strong women as the protagonist, such as the Launder and Gilliat "unofficial trilogy", Millions Like Us (1943) Two Thousand Women (1944) and Waterloo Road (1945). The Huggetts (1947–1949) film series were also notable in this regard. However, it was the melodramas that were the biggest financial successes for Gainsborough.

The dynamics of the paying viewing public changed in 1946, with men returning from war, and this brought about a change in the successful formula of the melodramas, in that, on the release of Caravan (1946) and The Magic Bow (1946), there was more focus on men and masculinity, rather than on women, who were relegated to supporting roles. However, 1947 would see a return to the previous formula of putting the women front and centre, which had been central to the previous films' success. It has been argued Rank "ran the Gainsborough melodramas into the ground".

== Reception ==
The critics had a scathing analysis upon their initial reception of the films, and they were not alone, as some of the films' stars also expressed their dissatisfaction with the releases. Stewart Granger described Love Story (1944) as "a load of crap – and a smash hit!", while calling Madonna of the Seven Moons (1945) and Caravan (1946) "terrible films" and saying that he "didn't like" Fanny by Gaslight (1944) because of its "drippy characters". Meanwhile, Phyllis Calvert said in a 1983 British Film Institute interview "I hated the films [...] in retrospect, they're even worse now than they seemed at the time. I find it very difficult to say anything nice about them."

Despite this, the films were popular with the public to an extent that they catapulted Granger, Calvert and their co-stars Margaret Lockwood, James Mason, Patricia Roc, and Jean Kent into stardom, and in subsequent years the films have become the subject of more favourable study. Following the positive reception by the public of The Man in Grey (1943), a number of similar pictures were made, often based on melodramatic period novels. The films dominated the British box office, out-grossing top Hollywood productions and breaking a number of records. In 2004, the British Film Institute compiled a list of the 100 biggest UK cinematic hits of all time, based on audience figures, as opposed to gross takings. Two Gainsborough melodramas appeared on this list: The Wicked Lady (1945) was placed 9th, with an estimated attendance of 18.4 million people, while Fanny by Gaslight (1944) was placed 40th, with an estimated attendance of 11.7 million people.

In regards solely to British productions, the same list identified that the most popular films were The Wicked Lady (1945), which was ranked second of all time, just behind Spring in Park Lane (1948), and Fanny by Gaslight, ranked as 13th in the twentieth century and 15th in the all-time ranking. The first Daily Mail National Film Awards in 1946, which are seen as the predecessor to the British Film Academy Awards (later BAFTA) and inspiration for the current National Film Awards UK, saw The Man in Grey (1943) voted second in the category for "Best Film" made between 1939 and 1945, behind The Way to the Stars (1945). Two other Gainsborough melodramas, Madonna of the Seven Moons (1945) and They Were Sisters (1945), were voted third and fourth, respectively. Margaret Lockwood took the honour of "most popular and outstanding British actress during the war years", ahead of Phyllis Calvert in second place, and Patricia Roc, who was third. James Mason was voted as the "most popular and outstanding British actor during the war years", with Stewart Granger in third place.

In the 1947 awards, The Wicked Lady (1945) came second behind Piccadilly Incident (1946) for the "Best Film Award", with Lockwood and Mason claiming the renamed "Best Actress Award" and "Best Actor Award" for their roles in the former film. Lockwood would attain the "Best Actress Award" for a third time in a row in 1948, for her role in Jassy (1947), while her co-stars in the film, Patricia Roc and Dennis Price, were voted third and fourth in their respective Best Actress Award and Best Actor Award categories . Despite the film coming in fourth in the "Best Film Award" category behind The Courtneys of Curzon Street (1947), Great Expectations (1946), and Odd Man Out (1947), Jassy was officially the final Gainsborough melodrama film, and the only one to be made in Technicolor.

=== Melodramas ===
The first film in the sequence, The Man in Grey (1943), was based on a novel of the same name by Eleanor Smith. It tells the story of a young woman and a cold aristocrat who enter into a marriage of convenience. When the young woman falls in love with a strolling actor, her hopes of eloping to happiness are constantly wrecked by the aristocrat who cares more for the reputation of the family name, and by an old school friend who has designs on marrying her husband. The film proved to be a major success on its release. It was the seventh most popular movie at the British box office in 1943. Phyllis Calvert later recalled it "had two West End premieres. It had one premiere, got terrible notices, went through the provinces and made so much money that it had to come back to London". On the film's release in Australia in 1945, it was the only British film listed in the top ten most popular films.

Love Story (1944) was adapted from the short story "Love and Forget" by J. W. Drawbell, although director and co-screenwriter Leslie Arliss would later say he was also inspired by two other short magazine stories, "The Ship Sailed at Night" and "A Night in Algiers". The film explores a contemporary rivalrous love triangle between a concert pianist (Lockwood) who, due to a heart condition, has months to live, a former RAF pilot who is going blind from a wartime injury (Granger), and the pilot's childhood friend (Roc), who is secretly in love with him. The film was a huge success at the British box-office.

The third film in the sequence, and the second of the costume dramas, was Fanny by Gaslight (1944). Adapted from the novel of the same name by Michael Sadleir, the film details the obstacles a young woman, who is born illegitimate and raised by her birth mother and step father, encounters to marry the man she loves, who is defined as "well born". Upon its release, the film was a big hit, and claimed the accolade of being the second most popular film in Britain during 1944, after This Happy Breed (1944). However, it performed very badly at the box office in the US.

Due to the success of the previous three films over the two years, Gainsborough released four melodramas in 1945. The first, Madonna of the Seven Moons (1945), was adapted from the novel by Margery Lawrence. The film tells the story of a woman who developed dual personalities as a result of having been raped as a young girl, and unbeknownst to her and her loved ones, leads a double life: the first as a respectable wife and mother, the second as the mistress to a jewel thief in the house of the Seven Moons. The film was very popular at the British box office, being one of the most seen films of that year. When it was released in Australia in 1946, it was the only British film among the ten most popular films.

The next film in the sequence, A Place of One's Own (1945), was adapted from a novel by Osbert Sitwell, and tells the story of a newly retired elderly couple who purchase a house that has been vacant for many years. The house is haunted by its previous occupier, who may have died under suspicious circumstances, and now takes possession of the couple's newly employed companion, Annette, who resembles the spirit physically. Despite the film performing well at the British box office, it was viewed as a financial disappointment, considering that it starred two of the most popular actors in British cinema at the time, James Mason and Margaret Lockwood.

The next film, They Were Sisters (1945), fared much better, and was one of the biggest hits of the year. The story was adapted from the popular novel by Dorothy Whipple, and explored the diversity of marital relationships of three sisters and the effect on their children. The first sister is in a loving, but childless marriage; the second sister, who has a child, is egocentric and indulges in multiple flirtations (sometimes in front of her husband) and an extramarital affair to relieve her of her boredom; while the third sister, who also has children, is in an emotionally abusive marriage to a brutal, sadistic, and controlling man.

The final melodrama released by Gainsborough in 1945 was The Wicked Lady. The film was adapted from the novel Life And Death of the Wicked Lady Skelton by Magdalen King-Hall and tells the story of a selfish, manipulative and vindictive woman who engages in a double life, as noble lady and highwaywoman, for excitement and gratification. Released in December 1945, The Wicked Lady was not only the most popular film at the British box office in 1946, but also the most successful film Gainsborough Pictures produced overall. It was shortlisted for the "Best British Film" award for 1946 at the Daily Mail National Film Awards, held in 1947, finishing second behind Piccadilly Incident (1946); it also claimed "Best Actor" and "Best Actress" awards for James Mason and Margaret Lockwood, respectively. Head of Production at Gainsborough Maurice Ostrer wanted to capitalize on the success of the film by making a sequel; however, J. Arthur Rank, whose company owned Gainsborough, was not in favour, and subsequently vetoed any plans to make a follow-up film.

Leslie Arliss did go on to write a sequel for the film, titled The Wicked Lady's Daughter, in 1950, but it was never made into a film. Ironically, Arliss's last film credit was as screenwriter for the remake of The Wicked Lady (1983), which was directed by Michael Winner and starred Faye Dunaway. However the film was not successful, and it received a "Worst Actress" Razzie nomination for Dunaway.

Gainsborough released two melodramas in 1946 that took a change in the direction from the previous melodramas, in that both were more focused on men and masculinity. The first film, Caravan, was adapted from the novel of the same name by Eleanor Smith. It was the second novel by Smith to be transformed into a Gainsborough melodrama after The Man in Grey (1943). The film tells the story of a love triangle that begins in childhood and concludes with a double love triangle in adulthood, involving violence and larceny. Following a young aspiring writer's intervention in an attempted robbery of a valuable necklace from its guardian, he agrees to transport the item to its owners in Spain, so that he can earn the money he requires to marry his childhood sweetheart. However, while in Spain, he is robbed, injured, and left for dead by his love rival's agent, and is saved from death by a young gypsy girl. Caravan was a notable box office attraction at British cinemas in 1946, becoming the sixth most successful film after The Wicked Lady, The Bells of St Marys, Piccadilly Incident, The Captive Heart and Road to Utopia. It was shortlisted for the "Best British Film" for 1946 at the 1947 Daily Mail National Film Awards. The second melodrama released by Gainsborough in 1946, The Magic Bow, was adapted from the biographic novel, The Magic Bow: A Romance of Paganini by Manuel Komroff. The film tells the story of the Italian violinist and composer Niccolò Paganini before he becomes famous, and deals with his determination to attain the admiration that he feels he deserves. However, on his journey to greatness, he engages in an affair with a French noble lady, whose parents wish for her to marry a respectable high ranking French military officer, rather than a common musician. The film was again successful at the British box office. It was the only new release British film to be entered into the 1946 Cannes Film Festival.

The final three Gainsborough melodrama films, released in 1947, reverted to placing women as the protagonist. The first, The Root of All Evil, was adapted from the J. S. Fletcher novel of the same name, and tells the story of a woman who vows to never again face the public ignominy from a man's duplicity and ruthlessness, following being jilted by her fiancé at the behest of his wealthy grocer father, and his father's inaction to prevent the eviction of her and her family from their farm. However, the more wealthy she becomes, the more her behaviour resembles that of her antagonist. Despite the film having a big budget, it could not entice an audience at the box office, and subsequently made big financial losses.

The penultimate Gainsborough melodrama, The Brothers (1947) did not fare any better, and made massive losses for Gainsborough at the box office, although the film has been reviewed more favourably in more recent years. Adapted from the novel of the same name by L. A. G. Strong, the film tells the story of a young orphaned woman, who, after leaving the convent where she was raised from childhood, arrives on the Isle of Skye to become a servant to a clan chief and his two sons. Whilst there, she discovers life to be austere, and she is treated no better than livestock. She soon becomes embroiled in an old clan feud between her employer and a rival clan, and is at the centre of a tug of war battle between the two brothers.

The next film, Jassy (1947), marked the official end of the Gainsborough melodrama period, and was the only one of the sequence of films to be made in Technicolor. Adapted from the novel of the same name by Norah Lofts, the film tells the story of a young gypsy woman pursued by superstitious villagers as a witch, due to her being gifted with second sight, and how she is saved from persecution and employed as a housekeeper by the son of a country gentleman and his family. However, the family has lost their stately country home due to the father's drinking and gambling, and the young woman plans to use her talent to raise her social standing and return the property to the son, whom she loves. Gainsborough described the box office performance of the film as "excellent", and it was the seventh most popular movie at the British box office upon its release in 1947; by 1953, it had accumulated a net revenue of £200,000.

=== Problems with the US Censor ===
A number of the melodramas encountered problems with the US censor code, which required significant portions of the films to be cut, modified or reshot, and in some cases, this resulted in delays in their US release dates. The Motion Picture Production Code, referred to as the Hays Code after Will H. Hays, the then president of the Motion Picture Producers and Distributors of America (MPPDA), was not law, but rather an agreement between MPPDA members' studios and theatres to censor to clean up the image of motion pictures viewed by the American public, and to avoid Federal and/or State legislators becoming involved in the film industry. Films that did not adhere to the code were denied a certificate from the Production Code Administration (PCA), and therefore could not be released in American theatres.

In contrast to the PCA's written code, the British Board of Film Censors (BBFC) model, which was established in 1912 for similar reasons to why the MPPDA had set up the PCA, was not a written code, and producers considered it to be abstruse, with violations transmitted after the film was submitted for certification. However, the BBFC strove to provide some clarity for producers in the forthcoming years; first in 1916, during the National Council of Public Morals: Cinema Commission of Inquiry, when the then president of the BBFC, T.P. O'Connor, listed forty-three infractions from the BBFC 1913–1915 annual reports, where a cut in a film may be required; and secondly in 1926, when the BBFC annual report outlined grounds in seven broad categories that justified censorship, including issues related to religion, politics, military, social themes, and questions of sex, crime and cruelty.

There are suggestions that these clarifications to the BBFC model had an effect on the authors of the Motion Picture Production Code, whereby they had practically adapted the BBFC model to suit their cultural tastes; however, the PCA would go on to influence the BBFC model, to such an extent that both codes would go on to look very similar to each other, and regarded similar acts as constituting violations to their codes. The significant difference between the two models was that the BBFC were more inclined to be lenient on American films with issues that were culturally relevant to Americans, because they assumed the British public would understand this cultural difference, such as with issues related to gangsters and bootlegging. On the other hand, the PCA were not so lenient on British or other foreign productions that featured themes of cultural importance, and were more likely to seek changes to the film before it could be viewed by the American public. European film executives, including those from Britain, had long complained that Hollywood deliberately used the code to stifle foreign competition (which increased the financial burden of foreign studios) and poach talent, to therefore dominate the film industry.

Amongst the British big-budget films to encounter frivolous or questionable problems with the PCA were Black Narcissus (1947) and Oliver Twist (1948), both due to religious and moral grounds; Henry V, for the use of the word bastard, and Bad Lord Byron (1949), not for the film itself, but because the PCA objected to Lord Byron as a character. However, more recent analysis by film historians has concluded that the PCA were sympathetic towards British productions, and tried to help them succeed in the American market.

Love Story (1944) ran into trouble with the PCA on the use of language the censors deemed provocative. Although this was mild in comparison to what other Gainsborough melodramas would encounter, the PCA would become much stricter on language, such as what they deemed to be lines containing a double meaning, and were insinuating sex. The PCA refused to grant Fanny by Gaslight (1944) a certificate for its US release until the title of the film was changed, the illegitimacy of Fanny was altered, scenes set in a brothel were changed to a dancehall or a gambling house, the scene of Fanny as a little girl talking to two prostitutes on the street was deleted, and the scenes of Fanny and Somerford living together outside of marriage were removed, as they perceived these issues violated the Hays purity Code, whilst also normalising fallen women and immoral behaviour. The film's US release was delayed by three years, with Gainsborough changing the title to the PCA's recommended title Man of Evil, the deletion of eighteen minutes of the film, including the scene of Fanny talking to the two prostitutes, fewer scenes of Fanny and Somerford living together outside of marriage, and the lowering of the tone of the scenes concerning the brothel.

Changes had also to be made to Madonna of the Seven Moons (1945) before it could receive its US release. These included the toning down of the rape scene, in which the sections with the perpetrator removing his belt and the close up of young Maddalena's face filled with fear as she is running from the pursuing man were cut, and shortened to the preceding scene, in which the man is seen following her out of the audience's view. The subsequent scene with Maddalena returning to her room was also shortened. Rather than see her cry, fall onto her bed and clasp her stomach in pain, the US viewers see her cry and fall onto her bed. Calvert was critical of the interference by the PCA on alterations to lighting: whereas scenes between Maddalena and Nino were darkened, in contrast to scenes with Maddalena and her husband Giuseppe, as the censors deemed, despite Maddalena having a mental illness that impacted on her cognitive awareness, that she was still committing adultery, and adulterous women were taboo.

Another act that Madonna of the Seven Moons was adjudged to have violated the Hays code was two people being on a bed with no feet on the ground, as the PCA perceived this indicated sexual intercourse. Of one such incident, Calvert says "we weren't allowed to be two on a bed without somebody's feet being on the floor. And so when Granger and I had the bedroom scene in Madonna of the Seven Moons, we did in fact do it on a bed with all our feet off the ground – but they showed it very dark with just two cigarettes, so the audience wouldn't know where we were." However, the BBFC had the same violation in their code of conduct in films, which the American comedian Fred Allen would also recall in a letter to Groucho Marx. In the scene between Maddalena's daughter Angela and Nino's brother Sandro, Allen wrote "I hope you noted the item that involved the reshooting of a scene in the film "Madonna of the seven Moons", the scene was an attempted rape of the chaste Angela and the actor kept forgetting that the British Board of Censors will not pass any seduction scene unless the seducer has one foot on the floor, apparently sex in England is something like snooker."

Scenes of rape and adultery in The Wicked Lady (1945) were also highlighted by the PCA, which led them to define the film as "making adultery look like too much fun". While the ending of the film complied with the BBFC's code stipulating that criminals should get their comeuppance, it did not go far enough for the PCA, who added that the villain showed no remorse for her crimes and "died as she lived, happy and unrepented". However, the biggest criticism the PCA had was for the women's dress bodices (appropriate for the era portrayed), which they perceived to be very low-cut, and showing too much cleavage for their Motion Picture Production Code. This was the first time the word cleavage had been applied in reference to an area of a woman's anatomy; previously, the PCA had used the term décolletage when assessing films. The American media were also outraged by the design of the dresses, declaring "Americans do not want half naked women like Patricia Roc in this movie". To remedy the situation, extensive re-shooting was required before the film could be released in the United States; however, the damage was done, and exhibitors later publicised that the film had "suffered too much from the censors to be entirely satisfactory".

The stars of the film were furious at the response of the PCA, with Margaret Lockwood saying "We had to do nine days of retakes to satisfy the censor on that film and it all seemed very foolish". James Mason added "I don't like it now", referring to the film after the changes. Meanwhile, Patricia Roc highlighted inconsistencies with the PCA's treatment of the film to that of an American feature of the same year (1945), saying that "The Breen Office, which was responsible for code enforcement was ever vigilant, but inconsistent if you consider the scantily dressed Betty Grable and June Haver in the American film The Dolly Sisters, which slipped through their own censorship".

The British film industry were also confused at the inconsistencies of the PCA's decisions, which they believed were an attempt to exclude British films from the US market. J. Arthur Rank invited Joseph Breen, the then head of the PCA, to Britain for a meeting with the British Film Producers Association to advise them on how they could modify their films to be US code compliant before the films were released in the United States. The British press pressured Breen on the PCA's treatment of British films during his interviews with them, which they concluded was evidence of anti-British sentiment. They argued the PCA's double standards when it came to British films, such as The Wicked Lady, Pink String and Sealing Wax (1945), and Bedelia (1946, starring Lockwood), in comparison to American films, such as Double Indemnity (1944), The Miracle of Morgan's Creek (1944), Scarlet Street (1945), The Postman Always Rings Twice (1946) and specifically Forever Amber (1947) (which was due to be released) equally contained similar themes of adultery, premeditated murder, suicide, and rape to their British counterparts. However, whilst the American films seemed to get warnings, the British films were instructed to re-title films, alternate storylines, and perform cuts and/or reshoots of scenes to a degree whereby the film lost its appeal to the general public, and which impacted financially on the British film studios.

Despite these protestations, another British film and Gainsborough melodrama, They Were Sisters (1945), was treated much more leniently in comparison to other Gainsborough melodramas by the PCA on similar issues that they had previously deemed as being extremely offensive. The PCA recommended a toning down of infractions to their code in scenes related to adultery by the character of Vera, the suicide by Charlotte, and the inferred incestuous fantasies Geoffrey harboured towards his eldest daughter Margaret. The most serious infringement for the PCA was that the marital single beds of Lucy and William were too close to each other, a violation that Lockwood claimed her film The White Unicorn (1947) also incurred.

The impact of the scrutiny by the PCA on British films had an effect upon the direction of Gainsborough Pictures, with Maurice Ostrer capitulating to the US censor's norms in his final three Gainsborough melodramas, Caravan (1946), The Magic Bow (1946) and The Root of All Evil (1947), which resulted in an easier transition to the US market, and fewer modifications required to be made to the films. While making The Magic Bow, producer R. J. Minney said that "We are doing it as delicately as possible, as a study of sacred and profane love. Paganini's relationship with Bianca is rather a tricky business to get past the Hays Office, but we hope, with tact, to manage it." Caravan was also required to deviate from its script to satisfy the US censor; however, the final product retained some scenes that may suggest either a relaxation by the PCA, or negligence on behalf of the reviewer in comparison to previous complaints by the PCA. Examples of this are Francis inviting a group of prostitutes to dinner to humiliate his wife Oriana, and the interaction between his assistant Wycroft and Richard, which includes the way Wycroft feels Richard's bicep during the voyage from England to Spain. The latter example is more pronounced, as it suggested homosexual motives by Wycroft, played by Robert Helpmann (himself a gay actor), and homosexuality was deemed to be deviant in nature. It was also illegal in both Britain and the United States during the year of the film's release.

Sydney Box's first film during his period in charge at Gainsborough, Jassy (1947), passed through the PCA with relative ease, despite some public outcry that the film glorified witchcraft. However, this would prove to be the exception rather than the norm for Box, who encountered numerous battles with the US censor, even after he had left Gainsborough. The director of The Brothers (1947), David MacDonald, knew before the film's release that it would be in trouble with the censor due to the film containing, as he put it "Rape, murder and nature, that's about all", but added that "We hope to get by in the French way." One such scene was when Patricia Roc's character is skinny dipping. A precedent was established by the BBFC's assessment of the Gainsborough film Two Thousand Women (1944), whereby viewers see Phyllis Calvert's naked back and Roc's naked back and side of breast, which they passed without cuts. However, the PCA were not so lenient with the latter title, and held up the film's release in the United States for seven years, until the film was retitled to House of 1,000 Women with sixteen minutes of the film cut, including amongst others, scenes showing Calvert's and Roc's naked backs.

Box cited the rulings by Lord Cromer, the then Lord Chamberlain and censor for all theatrical performances in London, in regard to the Windmill Girls show in the Windmill Theatre, and the New York Censor Review Board in relation to the pre-code film Four Frightened People (1934), when arguing for the inclusion of the skinny dipping scene in his film. In regards to the Windmill Girls, Lord Cromer found that nude statutes or paintings in museums were not considered as obscene, but art, and therefore a live nude woman standing stationary, as a Tableau vivant, could not be considered as obscene, but instead also as art, unless there was movement by the nude woman, in which case it would be rude and obscene. Meanwhile, the New York Censor Review Board permitted a scene with Claudette Colbert bathing under a jungle waterfall nude, following director Cecil DeMille's prevaricated intervention, highlighting that it was only shot in extreme long shot, and a flesh-coloured body suit was worn.

Box argued the scene with Roc was not perversion or pornographic, but rather it was art, and that the scene was filmed in extreme long shot, which provided context to the isolation of the film's setting, while also minimising Roc, who was shot with her back to the camera. The BBFC were satisfied with Box's explanation, and certified the film with the skinny dipping scene intact, whilst the PCA were not convinced, and demanded it be removed. Box would go on to use the same Tableau vivant argument for the film Broken Journey (1948), in which air stewardess Mary Johnstone (played by Phyllis Calvert) hands passenger Jimmy Marshall (played by David Tomlinson) an airline folder that contained a hidden magazine titled Beauté modern, which featured a topless woman on the cover. In the subsequent scenes, Marshall is seen flicking through the pages, revealing a number of full-frontal nude women in a number of different poses. Other challenges The Brothers (1947) encountered with the PCA before its US release were with its depiction of illicit whiskey manufacturing, and the finale, which culminated in the tragic deaths of two characters. Despite this, however, Box managed to satisfy the censor by adding some shots in which detectives arrived on the island to break up the whiskey operation, and by filming an ending in which "the good characters" survived, instead of being murdered.

== Style ==
Many of the films make use of chiaroscuro lighting and mildly expressionist imagery, influenced by the earlier style of German cinema. The producer Edward Black played a major role in overseeing a number of the earlier films. Later, Sydney Box became head of production at Gainsborough. The films were made either at Gainsborough's Islington Studios or the larger Lime Grove Studios in Shepherd's Bush.

Following the end of the war, the films began to make losses at the box office as they fell out of fashion. To try to re-kindle interest, Jassy, the only Gainsborough melodrama made in Technicolor was released in 1947; however, it was not successful and this marked the official end of the Gainsborough melodrama period. Sydney Box, who had taken over at Gainsborough Pictures in 1946, hoped to move away from melodramas to social realism, but subsequent films that followed Jassy, such as Good-Time Girl, When the Bough Breaks, and Boys in Brown bore a resemblance to the old Gainsborough melodrama formula.

== Attempts at Revival ==
There have been attempts to revive the success of the Gainsborough melodramas, including The Gypsy and the Gentleman, but they have been unsuccessful.

== Personnel ==
A large number of actors appeared in the films, but they are particularly associated with James Mason, Margaret Lockwood, Phyllis Calvert, Stewart Granger, Patricia Roc, Jean Kent, Anne Crawford, Dennis Price and Dulcie Gray. Leslie Arliss directed several of the most successful films. Other directors included Arthur Crabtree, Anthony Asquith and Bernard Knowles.

== Selected films ==
- The Man in Grey (1943)
- Love Story (1944)
- Fanny by Gaslight (1944)
- Madonna of the Seven Moons (1945)
- A Place of One's Own (1945)
- They Were Sisters (1945)
- The Wicked Lady (1945)
- Caravan (1946)
- The Magic Bow (1946)
- The Root of All Evil (1947)
- The Brothers (1947)
- Jassy (1947)

== See also ==
- List of Gainsborough Pictures films

== Bibliography ==
- Aldgate, Anthony & Richards, Jeffrey. Britain Can Take It: British Cinema in the Second World War. I.B. Tauris, 2007.
- Cook, Pam (ed.). Gainsborough Pictures. Cassell, 1997.
- Murphy, Robert. Realism and Tinsel: Cinema and Society in Britain 1939–48. Routledge, 1992.
