= Jassy (film) =

- UK release poster
- Directed by: Bernard Knowles
- Written by: Dorothy Christie; Campbell Christie; Geoffrey Kerr
- Based on: novel by Norah Lofts
- Produced by: Sydney Box executive J. Arthur Rank
- Starring: Margaret Lockwood; Patricia Roc; Dennis Price; Dermot Walsh; Basil Sydney
- Cinematography: Geoffrey Unsworth
- Edited by: Charles Knott
- Music by: Henry Geehl
- Production company: Gainsborough Pictures
- Distributed by: General Film Distributors (UK); Universal Pictures (US)
- Release date: 12 August 1947 (UK)
- Running time: 100 minutes
- Country: United Kingdom
- Language: English
- Box office: £200,000

Jassy is a 1947 British colour film historical melodrama directed by Bernard Knowles and starring Margaret Lockwood, Patricia Roc and Dennis Price. It was written by Dorothy Christie, Campbell Christie and Geoffrey Kerr based on the 1944 novel by Norah Lofts. Set in the early 19th century, it is a Gainsborough melodrama, the only one to be made in Technicolor, and was the last "official" Gainsborough melodrama.

== Plot ==
Christopher Hatton owns the country estate Mordelaine. While Hatton's son Barney has a romantic tryst with Dilys Helmar, Hatton loses his estate in a game of dice to Dilys' father Nick.

The Hattons have to move out to a cottage in a nearby village. One day, Barney sees some villagers attacking a young woman, whom he rescues. She is Jassy Woodroofe, daughter of Tom Woodroofe and a gypsy mother. Jassy has the gift of second sight which causes the villagers to regard her as a witch.

Mrs Hatton hires Jassy as a domestic servant. Meanwhile, blacksmith Bob Wicks whips his daughter Lindy so badly she becomes mute, despite Tom Woodroofe coming to her rescue.

Nick Helmar and his family move into Mordelaine. Nick allows Christopher Hatton to continue gambling. When Hatton is caught cheating, he kills himself.

Nick finds his wife has been unfaithful and expels her from Mordelaine.

Tom Woodroofe leads a crowd of villagers to march on the Helmars, who are now their landlords, to demand better pay and conditions. Back in the village, Jassy senses something bad will happen and asks Barney to help. A drunken Nick confronts Tom and accidentally shoots him.

Jassy and Barney become close which worries Barney's mother. She sends her to a ladies' finishing school with a good recommendation and she starts work as a maid, but becomes friends with some of the young ladies, particularly Dilys Helmar. Dilys sneaks out for a romantic tryst one night and when Jassy covers for her, Jassy is dismissed.

Dilys takes Jassy home with her to Mordelaine, giving her some of her own clothes and pretending that she is a school friend. Nick says he feels he has seen Jassy before, or at least knows her surname. Jassy says he should remember that name, since he shot her father dead outside the house door. He later tells her it was an accident and that he hopes she'll "let bygones be bygones."

Dilys and Jassy go to see Barney. Dilys and Barney resume their romance, which upsets Jassy, who still loves Barney and knows that Dilys is also seeing Stephen Fennell.

Nick offers Jassy the job of running Mordelaine. Jassy restructures the staff, hiring the mute Lindy at the recommendation of Mrs Wicks, but firing almost all the female staff, including the maid Nick had been having an affair with.

One day, Jassy catches Dilys and Stephen together. Nick horsewhips Dilys, who runs out into the arms and carriage of Stephen. Barney goes to see Stephen and finds that he and Dilys are engaged.

Nick proposes marriage to Jassy, who agrees on condition he gives her Mordelaine as a wedding gift. They marry, but Jassy insists on living separately as their legal agreement says nothing of sleeping together. In a fury, Nick goes out riding and has an accident.

He is brought back to Mordelaine, where the doctor prescribes a strict diet and no alcohol, which Jassy enforces, even though Nick is increasingly violent towards her. When Jassy goes to visit Dilys and Stephen, Lindy decides to poison Nick for what he's done to Jassy, slipping rat poison into a bottle of brandy, which Nick drinks greedily.

Nick's murder is sensed by Jassy, who cries out that he's dead. Stephen thinks that this means that she has murdered him, and has her arrested along with Lindy.

At the trial, despite Jassy's alibi, both she and Lindy are found guilty, but the shock goads Lindy into speech. She confesses to the murder which exonerates Jassy, dropping dead with the stress.

Barney reads a letter where Jassy had signed over Mordelaine to himself in expectation of her impending sentence: with her exoneration Barney refuses it and realises he loves Jassy as much as he loves Mordelaine.

== Cast ==
- Margaret Lockwood as Jassy Woodroofe
- Patricia Roc as Dilys Helmar
- Dennis Price as Christopher Hatton
- Basil Sydney as Nick Helmar
- Dermot Walsh as Barney Hatton
- Esma Cannon as Lindy Wicks
- Cathleen Nesbitt as Elizabeth Twisdale
- Linden Travers as Beatrice Helmar
- Nora Swinburne as Mrs Hatton
- Ernest Thesiger as Sir Edward Follesmark
- Jean Cadell as Meggie
- Grace Arnold as Housemaid
- John Laurie as Tom Woodroofe
- Grey Blake as Stephen Fennell
- Bryan Coleman as Sedley – the architect
- Clive Morton as Sir William Fennell
- Torin Thatcher as Bob Wicks
- Beatrice Varley as Mrs Wicks
- Eliot Makeham as Moult – the butler
- Maurice Denham as Jim Stoner
- Alan Wheatley as Sir Edward Walker – Prosecuting Counsel
- Hugh Pryse as Sir John Penty – Defending Counsel

== Production ==
The film was based on a novel by Norah Lofts, originally published in 1944. Film rights were bought by Gainsborough Pictures who in 1946 saw Maurice Ostrer replaced as head of production by Sydney Box. In his last years, Ostrer had specialized in making melodramas that had been highly lucrative to the studio, many of which starred Margaret Lockwood. Box wanted to expand the variety of Gainsborough's output, but when he arrived Jassy was the only script ready to go into production. It would have been more expensive to let the sound stages go idle so the film went ahead. In August 1946 Box announced Gainsborough would make Jassy.

By this stage Gainsborough had lost the services of a number of people crucial to the success of the Gainsborough melodramas, including Leslie Arliss, Ted Black, Maurice Ostrer, Harold Huth and R. J. Minney.

John Cromwell was originally announced as director.

The film was given a large budget. It was considered a "special", i.e. one of the most expensive made by Gainsborough, and the first film shot in Technicolor there.

According to Dermot Walsh "they offered the part of my father to Peter Graves who turned it down on the grounds that playing father to a twenty one year old boy would make him look too old. So poor old Denis [Price] was trundled out."

Susan Shaw has a small role. Wilfred Bramble is one of the servants

== Reception ==
=== Box Office ===
The film was the seventh most popular movie at the British box office in 1947. Kinematograph Weekly called it "a notable attraction" at the box office in 1947.

By 1953 Jassy had earned net revenue of £200,000 and its box office performance was described as "excellent".

This encouraged Sydney Box to make two more costume film "specials", The Bad Lord Byron and Christopher Columbus, the financial failure of which ended the cycle.

=== Critical ===
The Monthly Film Bulletin wrote: "This is a long film, but during its whole course it does not seem to absorb one's attention. The plot is artificial and rather in the convention of the novelette, and the dialogue is trite to the point of pathos. There does not appear to be a convincing character in the whole affair, and there is certainly not a decent one among those who purport to be anything but bad. ... This is not a good film of its kind, and with the galaxy of stars in the minor parts, it seems a pity that something better could not have been achieved."

The Los Angeles Times liked the photography but criticised the acting and direction.

The New York Times said that:

With plot ramifications providing for infidelity, suicide, murders and a gypsy beauty endowed with second sight, it would seem that "Jassy" would add up to a swift and exciting movie. But this period piece, brilliantly accoutered in Technicolor and imported from England to begin a stand at the Winter Garden yesterday, is unimaginative drama, hampered rather than helped by its story lines and not too greatly aided by some broad and stylized characterizations. Boiled down to essentials, "Jassy" is a combination of several plots, mostly familiar, the sum of which makes for a rather rambling and routine entertainment.

== Bibliography ==
- Cook, Pam (ed.). Gainsborough Pictures. Cassell, 1997.
