= Maurice Ostrer =

British film executive (1896–1975)

Maurice Ostrer (né Morris Ostravitch; 9 May 1896 – 3 December 1975) was a British film executive. He was best known for overseeing the Gainsborough melodramas. He was head of production at Gainsborough Studios from 1943–46, taking over from Edward Black. He resigned from the studio in 1946 after a disagreement with J. Arthur Rank, who had taken over the studio. Ostrer left the film industry and went to work in textiles.

Ostrer was born in Bow, London, to Jewish emigrants Nathan Ostravitch from Minsk and Fanny Schäfer from Loslau, Prussia.

He was married to actress Renee Clama, with whom he had two sons, Darryl (1934–2012) and Nigel (born 1935).

According to writer Robert Murphy, "Maurice's subsequent disappearance from the film industry... makes it easy to dismiss him as a dilettante whose success owed more to luck than judgement. The break-up of the partnership with [producer Ted] Black was unfortunate and Gainsborough became severely debilitated in terms of acting, writing and directing talent. But of the ten films Maurice Ostrer was directly responsible for, seven were big box-office successes and his vision of an efficiently run studio dedicated to medium budget entertainment films with the emphasis on a particular genre was unique and it was to provide a model for Hammer a decade later."

He died in 1975 in Cannes.

== Premier Productions ==
In 1946 Ostrer set up his own production company, Premiere Productions. He put a number of actors under contract including Michael Redgrave, Michael Rennie, Andrew Cruickshank, Ethne Dunn,Beryl Baxter, Frederick Bradshaw, April Stride, and June Holden. e signed with R.J. Minney to make The Queen of Love (which became The Idol of Paris. Ostrer announced six other films:

- D. L. Murray Enter Three Witches;
- Lady Eleanor Smith's Magic Lantern;
- To Save My Life;
- 'Gamblers Sometimes Win;
- How Frail the Threads, a novel about present-day conditions in England; and
- Other Gods, a story of atomic age.

However after the box office failure of Idol of Paris, Premiere wound up. It briefly announced a return in 1952 to make Dare Devil Conquest but it was not made.

== Select credits ==
=== As Head of Production at Gainsborough ===
- Ask a Policeman (1939)
- A Girl Must Live (1939)
- Where's That Fire? (1939)
- The Frozen Limits (1939)
- Inspector Hornleigh on Holiday (1939)
- Band Waggon (1940)
- They Came by Night (1940)
- For Freedom (1940)
- Charley's (Big-Hearted) Aunt (1940)
- Night Train to Munich (1940)
- Girl in the News (1940)
- Gasbags (1940)
- Neutral Port (1940)
- The Ghost Train (1941)
- Inspector Hornleigh Goes To It (1941)
- Kipps (1941)
- Once a Crook (1941)
- Cottage to Let (1941)
- I Thank You (1941)
- Hi Gang! (1941)
- Back-Room Boy (1942)
- The Young Mr. Pitt (1942)
- Uncensored (1942)
- King Arthur Was a Gentleman(1942)
- It's That Man Again (1943)
- We Dive at Dawn (1943)
- Miss London Ltd (1943)
- The Man in Grey (1943)
- Dear Octopus (1943)
- Millions Like Us (1943)
- Time Flies (1944)
- Bees in Paradise (1944)
- Fanny By Gaslight (1944)
- Give Us the Moon (1944)
- Two Thousand Women (1944)
- Love Story (1944)
- Madonna of the Seven Moons (1944)
- Victory Wedding (1944)
- Waterloo Road (1945)
- A Place of One's Own (1945)
- They Were Sisters (1945)
- I'll Be Your Sweetheart (1945)
- The Wicked Lady (1945)
- Caravan (1946)
- The Magic Bow (1946)
- The Root of All Evil (1947)

=== Executive producer ===
- Love Story (1944)
- Madonna of the Seven Moons (1944)
- A Place of One's Own (1944)
- They Were Sisters (1945)
- I'll Be Your Sweetheart (1945)
- The Wicked Lady (1945)
- The Magic Bow (1946)
- Caravan (1946)
- The Root of All Evil (1947)
- Idol of Paris (1948)

== Notes ==
- Murphy, Robert (1997). "Gainsborough's producers". In Pam Cook (ed.). Gainsborough Pictures. Cassell.
