= The Man Who Disappeared =

The Man Who Disappeared may refer to:

- The Man Who Disappeared (film serial), a 1914 American drama film serial
- The Man Who Disappeared (1951 film), a short television film adaptation of "The Man With the Twisted Lip"
- Amerika (novel) novel by Franz Kafka which is also known as The Man Who Disappeared
