= University of Hertfordshire Press =

History of the University of Hertfordshire Press

University of Hertfordshire Press was formed in 1992 as the publishing wing of the University of Hertfordshire. Its first publication was a book celebrating the institution's change in status from polytechnic to university. Our Heritage (University of Hertfordshire Press, 1992) was a short history of the campuses of the new university, written by Anthony Ralph Gardner, a member of staff from the Library and Media Services Department.

UH Press grew out of the Hertfordshire Technical Information Service (HERTIS) which was a county-wide knowledge-sharing service for local industry, based at Hatfield Polytechnic. So much information was produced by this initiative that a HERTIS imprint was started to collate and publish the material. This early publishing activity was overseen by Bill Forster who became the head of UH Press when it was born. It is considered one of the leading UK university publishing houses.

== Subject areas ==
UH Press publishes in the following subject areas:

- Local and regional history
- Theatre studies
- Psychology
- Education
- Sustainable communities
- Law
- Romani studies

=== Romani studies ===
UH Press publishes books in the area of Romany Gypsy life, culture and history. English Gypsies and State Policies by David Mayall (UH Press, 1995) and On the Verge: The Gypsies of England by Donald Kenrick and Siam Bakewell (UH Press, 1995) were the first titles to be published in this area. UH Press was invited to join Interface, a Europe-wide consortium of publishers set up to disseminate research about the Romany peoples.

=== Literature and Theatre studies ===
It also publishes in the area of literature and theatre studies, often in partnership with the Society for Theatre Research. Among the titles in this area are Professor Graham Holderness’s Shakespeare trilogy: Cultural Shakespeare (2001), Visual Shakespeare (2002) and Textual Shakespeare (2003). Reflecting the Audience: London Theatregoing, 1840–1880 by Jim Davis and Victor Emeljanow (Iowa University Press/University of Hertfordshire Press, 2001) won the 2001 Theatre Book Prize. The playtext The Al-Hamlet Summit by Sulayman Al-Bassam published by the press in 2006, won a Fringe First award at the 2002 Edinburgh Festival Fringe. In 2016 UH Press published a new critical edition of the 1944 novel Life and Death of the Wicked Lady Skelton by Magdalen King-Hall, with notes and an introduction by Rowland Hughes, "Shocking and entertaining in equal measures: a true gem from a bygone era. ★★★★★" The Lady Magazine. The novel was inspired by the legend of Lady Katherine Ferrers and was adapted into the classic British film The Wicked Lady, produced by Gainsborough Studios in 1945, starring Margaret Lockwood, Patricia Roc and James Mason.

=== History ===
The series Studies in Regional and Local History began in 2003 with A Hertfordshire Demesne of Westminster Abbey: Profits, productivity and weather by Derek Vincent Stern and Chris Thornton (UH Press, 2003). This series reached volume 14 in 2016 with Custom and Commercialisation in English Rural Society: Revisiting Tawney and Postan by J.P. Bowen and A.T. Brown (eds) (UH Press, 2016). Another series, Explorations in Local and Regional History, is a continuation and development of the 'Occasional Papers' of the University of Leicester's Department of English Local History, a series started by Herbert Finberg in 1952.

Hertfordshire Publications became an imprint of UH Press in 2001 and publishes local history books with a focus on Hertfordshire. The imprint is an association between UH Press and the Hertfordshire Association for Local History. In 2015 it published Archaeology in Hertfordshire: Festschrift for Tony Rook by Kris Lockyear (ed) to celebrate the life and work of Tony Rook, a leading practitioner of archaeology in the county and is "based on a conference marking Mr Rook's 80th birthday".
