= Build a Better Mousetrap =

- The Avengers episode
- Screen title
- Episode no.: Season 3 Episode 21
- Directed by: Peter Hammond
- Written by: Brian Clemens
- Production code: 3610
- Original air date: 15 February 1964

Guest appearances
- Athene Seyler; Nora Nicholson; Harold Goodwin; John Tate; Alison Seebohm

Episode chronology
| ← Previous "Trojan Horse" | Next → "The Outside-In Man" |

"Build a Better Mousetrap" is the twenty-first episode of the third series of the 1960s cult British spy-fi television series The Avengers, starring Patrick Macnee and Honor Blackman. It was first broadcast by ABC on 15 February 1964. The episode was directed by Peter Hammond and written by Brian Clemens.

== Plot ==
Cathy joins a motorcycle gang. Steed investigates an atomic plant which appears to be causing mechanical failure within a 2 mile radius. The gang and Cathy mention to Steed that the bikes also failed and mention two old sisters, Cynthia and Ermyntrude Peck, living in an old watermill, who warn the gang away from the area and threaten to cast a spell on them. Steed organizes a rally cross at night with a £25 prize. The two old ladies in hearing the noisy bikes then appear to do something with a jamming device which makes the bikes fail and again make reference to their witchcraft. The sisters catch a large mouse and put it in a bag as Steed arrives to visit them, claiming to be an "inspector of the National Distrust" and inspects the place.

Steed meets with the operator of the atomic plant who mentions that he believes the sisters to be the daughters of a late nuclear scientist of considerable renown. The daughters investigate the "National Distrust" in their directories and realize Steed is a spy. Steed revisits and battles with an assailant outside the mill and discovers the body of the atomic plant operator. Later, Dave, a gang member, tells Cathy that he has investigated the mill and has discovered the lock on one of the side doors is faulty which gives Steed and Cathy a chance to investigate whilst the sisters are at church. As Steed is about to leave the bar to visit the mill he is chatted up by a woman who offers him a whisky and drugs it and asks why he is interested in the old mill. Steed detects that it has been drugged, pours it behind his back and pretends to be knocked out, and then departs when the woman leaves the room. Cathy and Dave arrives at the mill first and enter and discover the jamming device. At that moment "Dave" removes his helmet and is discovered to be an imposter. Dave is later found tied up in the barn in which the motorcycle gang have been partying. The woman who attempted to drug Steed arrives with another accomplice and when the sisters return it appears that it is a gang attempting to steal their secret jamming system. Steed arrives as Cathy fends off the gang who flee leaving a distraught Cynthia who has to come to terms with the gang taking her "mousestrap" which she had spent all her life perfecting, only to then find the trap subdues the leader of the gang as he attempts to leave and is returned safely to her.

== Cast ==
- Patrick Macnee as John Steed
- Honor Blackman as Cathy Gale
- Athene Seyler as Cynthia Peck
- Nora Nicholson as Ermyntrude Peck
- Harold Goodwin as Harris
- John Tate as Colonel Wesker
- Alison Seebohm as Caroline Wesker
- Donald Webster as Dave
- Marian Diamond as Jessy
- Allan McClelland as Stigant
- Dave Anderson as Gordon

== Production ==
Production for the episode was completed on 28 August 1963.

== Reception ==
Doug Pratt describes the episode as "an enjoyable blend of absurd components".
