= The Outside-In Man =

- The Avengers episode
- Episode no.: Season 3 Episode 22
- Directed by: Jonathan Alwyn
- Written by: Philip Chambers
- Production code: 3622
- Original air date: 22 February 1964

Guest appearances
- Ronald Radd; James Maxwell; William Devlin; Basil Hoskins; Beryl Baxter; Arthur Lovegrove

Episode chronology
← Previous "Build a Better Mousetrap"	Next → "The Charmers"

"The Outside-In Man" is the twenty-second episode of the third series of the 1960s cult British spy-fi television series The Avengers, starring Patrick Macnee and Honor Blackman. It was first broadcast by ABC on 22 February 1964. The episode was directed by Jonathan Alwyn and written by Philip Chambers.

== Plot ==
Steed finds himself protecting a British defector, formerly Steed's target and now an enemy diplomat, from an assassin. Selling a used car is part of the scheme.

== Cast ==
- Patrick Macnee as John Steed
- Honor Blackman as Cathy Gale
- Ronald Radd as Quilpie
- James Maxwell as Mark Charter
- William Devlin as Ambassador
- Basil Hoskins as Major Zulficar
- Beryl Baxter as Helen Rayner
- Arthur Lovegrove as Michael Lynden
- Virginia Stride as Alice Brisket
- Philip Anthony as General Sharp
- Anthony Dawes as Edwards
- Ronald Mansell as Jenkins
- Valentino Musetti as Guard
- Eddie Powell as Guard
- Paul Blomley as Butcher
