= Clive of India (play) =

Play written by R. J. Minney

Clive of India is a play by the British author R.J. Minney. It portrays the life of the eighteenth century soldier and politician Robert Clive, particularly focusing on his victory at the Battle of Plassey. It was based on a biography of Clive that Minney had written two years earlier. First staged at the Theatre Royal at Windsor in 1933, it had a lengthy West End run from January 1934 to January 1935, originally at Wyndham's Theatre before a transfer to the Savoy, encompassing a total 413 performances. Leslie Banks played the title role, while the cast also included Raymond Huntley, Winifred Evans, Gillian Lind and Leo Genn.

== Film adaptation ==
The play drew immediate interest from production companies in both Britain and Hollywood. Twentieth Century's Darryl F. Zanuck secured the film rights, and hired Minney to work on the screenplay. Ronald Colman starred as Clive, alongside Loretta Young.

Lipscomb later adapted the script into a 1938 television play for the BBC.

== Bibliography ==
- Wearing, J.P. The London Stage 1930-1939: A Calendar of Productions, Performers, and Personnel. Rowman & Littlefield, 2014.
