= Michael Billington (critic) =

British author and arts critic (born 1939)

Michael Billington OBE
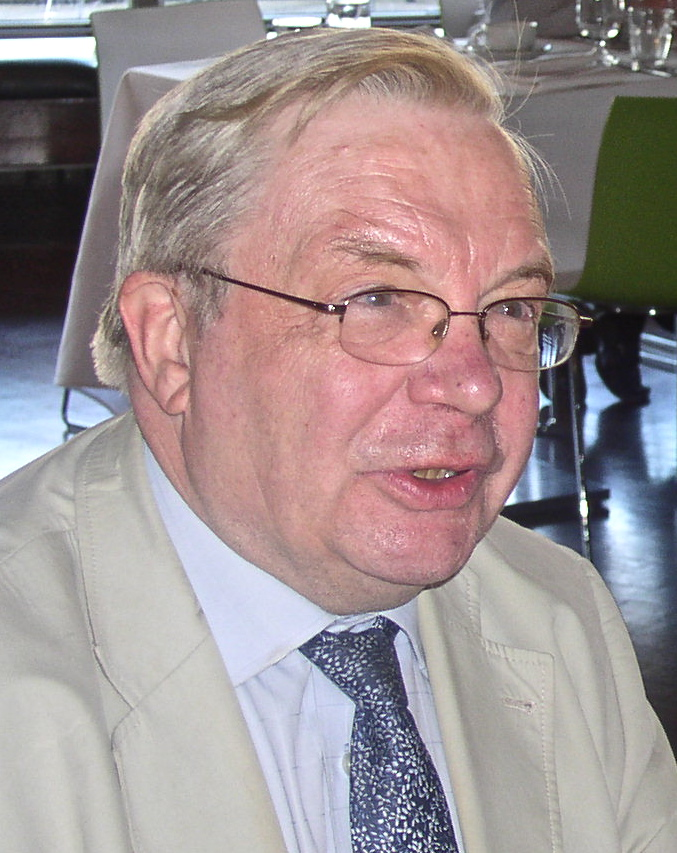
- Billington in 2010
- Born: Michael Keith Billington; 16 November 1939 (age 86); Leamington Spa, Warwickshire, England
- Education: Warwick School; St Catherine's College, Oxford (BA)
- Occupations: Author; arts critic
- Spouse: Jeanine Bradlaugh (m. 1978)
- Children: 1
- Writing career
- Period: 1961–present
- Genres: Criticism; biography
- Notable works: Harold Pinter (biography); State of the Nation: British Theatre Since 1945; The 101 Greatest Plays: From Antiquity to the Present
- Notable awards: Theatre Book Prize

Michael Keith Billington (born 16 November 1939) is a British author and arts critic. He writes for The Guardian, and was the paper's chief drama critic from 1971 to 2019. Billington is "Britain's longest-serving theatre critic" and the author of biographical and critical studies relating to British theatre and the arts. He is the authorised biographer of the playwright Harold Pinter (1930–2008).

== Early life and education ==
Billington was born on 16 November 1939, in Leamington Spa, Warwickshire, England, and attended Warwick School, an independent boys' school in Warwick. He attended St Catherine's College, Oxford, from 1958 to 1961, where he studied English and was appointed theatre critic of Cherwell. He graduated with a BA degree.

As a member of Oxford University Dramatic Society (OUDS), in 1959, Billington played the Priest in The Birds, by Aristophanes, his only appearance as an actor, and, in 1960, he directed a production of Eugène Ionesco's The Bald Prima Donna, a performance of which was attended by Harold Hobson, the drama critic for The Sunday Times. Although it won "an Oxford drama competition" and was an entry in that year's National Student Drama Festival (NSDF 1960), which Hobson had co-founded in 1956, Billington's directorial debut was not well received at the Festival, yet Billington credits Hobson with having "changed my life". After the Festival, he decided to forgo pursuing a career as a theatre practitioner to "follow" Hobson's "footsteps" and become a critic of theatre too; five years later, they would become colleagues at The Times.

== Career ==
After leaving Oxford in 1961, Billington began working as an arts critic in Liverpool for the Liverpool Daily Post & Echo. From 1962 to 1964, he served as public liaison officer and director for the Lincoln Theatre Company, in Lincolnshire. From 1965 to 1971, he reviewed television, films, and plays as an arts critic for The Times; from 1968 to 1978, he was also film reviewer for the Birmingham Post, and from 1968 to 1981, for The Illustrated London News. In October 1971, he left The Times to become theatre critic for The Guardian. Beginning in the 1980s, he was a London arts correspondent for The New York Times, and, since 1988, he has also served as drama critic for Country Life.

Billington's broadcasting career had begun by 1965. Philip French, then a BBC radio producer, asked him to review two short radio plays by the then virtually unknown Tom Stoppard which were being broadcast on the BBC Third Programme. Later, he was a presenter (and participant) in Critics Forum (Radio 3), which ended in 1990, and the Kaleidoscope arts programme (Radio 4). He has contributed to other British arts and drama radio and television programmes.

Billington blogs for guardian.co.uk and previously also blogged for WhatsOnStage.com. Billington left his role as The Guardian's chief theatre critic at the end of 2019, although he continues to write for the newspaper.

=== Academic work and conferences ===
Billington has taught in the University of Pennsylvania's Penn-in-London program since at least as early as 1997, and he teaches courses in theatre at King's College London, where he has been a visiting professor since 2002.

After attending the December 2005 Nobel Banquet, in Stockholm, on the occasion of Harold Pinter's being awarded the Nobel Prize in Literature, Billington attended the international symposium "Pinter: Passion, Poetry, Politics", which he had organised, in part celebrating Pinter's being awarded the Europe Theatre Prize, in Turin, Italy, in March 2006.

In April 2007, Billington presented an invited paper on "Is British Theatre As Good As It Claims?" to the Elizabethan Club, at Yale University, in New Haven, Connecticut, prior to moderating a panel discussion at the conference Artist and Citizen: 50 Years of Performing Pinter", at Leeds University, where he attended and later reviewed the production Being Harold Pinter, by the Belarus Free Theatre.

=== Biographical and critical studies ===
Billington is the author of several biographical and critical studies of subjects relating to British theatre and the arts, including books about Peggy Ashcroft (1907–1991), Tom Stoppard (born 1937), and Alan Ayckbourn (born 1939). He also wrote the official authorised biography of 2005 Nobel Laureate in Literature prizewinner Harold Pinter (1930–2008), which first appeared in 1996.

In March 2007 Faber and Faber published Billington's book State of the Nation: British Theatre Since 1945, which won the 2007 annual Theatre Book Prize from The Society for Theatre Research, presented to Billington by Sir Donald Sinden on 1 April 2008. Billington has spoken about the book at various venues, including the Warwick Arts Centre at the University of Warwick, and has reviewed his reviews.

Following Pinter's death on 24 December 2008, The Bookseller reported that Faber and Faber planned "to rush out an updated version" of Harold Pinter, "which will take account of the international response to Pinter's death, ... at the end of January [2009]" and that it "will be released first as an e-book."

=== Theatre work ===
As a director his work also includes The Will by Marivaux at the Barbican Conservatory, London, with an ensemble from the Royal Shakespeare Company in 1987; Pinter's The Lover and Strindberg's The Stronger at the Battersea Arts Centre in 1997, and in 2008 at the MacOwan Theatre, Kensington, Pinter's Party Time and Celebration with students from the London Academy of Music and Dramatic Art.

== Personal life ==
Billington lives in Chiswick, London, with his wife, Jeanine Bradlaugh; the couple have one daughter. Billington is a supporter of the Labour Party.

== In popular culture ==
In fiction, Billington's name was introduced in Death of a Hollow Man by Caroline Graham, later adapted for the Midsomer Murders television mystery series, in which DCI Tom Barnaby coaxes deluded local director, and double murderer, Harold Winstanly into accompanying him to the police station by suggesting Michael Billington and journalists from various respectable publications would be waiting to discuss his work.

== Honours ==
Billington was made an honorary fellow of St Catherine's College, Oxford, in 2005 and was awarded an honorary doctorate by The University of Warwick in July 2009.

He was appointed Officer of the Order of the British Empire (OBE) in the 2013 New Year Honours for services to the theatre.

== Bibliography ==
Books by Billington

- The Modern Actor. London: Hamilton, 1973. ISBN 978-0-241-02094-4.
- How Tickled I Am: A Celebration of Ken Dodd. London: Elm Tree Books, 1977. ISBN 978-0-241-89345-6.
- Alan Ayckbourn. London: Macmillan, 1984. ISBN 978-0-394-53856-3. Revised edition 1990. ISBN 978-0-394-62051-0.
- Stoppard: The Playwright. London: Methuen, 1987. ISBN 978-0-413-45850-6. ISBN 978-0-413-45860-5.
- Peggy Ashcroft. London: John Murray, 1988. ISBN 978-0-7195-4436-1.
- Approaches to Twelfth Night (editor). London: Nick Hern Books, 1990. ISBN 978-1-85459-007-7.
- One Night Stands: A Critic's View of British Theatre 1971–1991. London: Nick Hern Books, 1993. ISBN 978-1-85459-185-2. (Collection of reprinted reviews.)
- The Life and Work of Harold Pinter. London: Faber and Faber, 1996. ISBN 978-0-571-17103-3. 1997 [paperback] edition ISBN 978-0-571-19065-2. (Revised as Harold Pinter in 2007.)
- Stage and Screen Lives (editor). London: Oxford University Press, 2001. ISBN 978-0-19-860407-5.
- Harold Pinter. London: Faber and Faber, 2007. ISBN 978-0-571-17103-3. (Revised & updated [paperback] edition of The Life and Work of Harold Pinter [1997].)
- State of the Nation: British Theatre since 1945. London: Faber and Faber, 2007. ISBN 978-0-571-21034-3.

Book reviews

- "The Life and Work of Harold Pinter (Magill Book Reviews)". Salem on Literature: Magill Book Reviews. eNotes.com. Web. (Book review of the 1996 edition; later revised & enlarged as Harold Pinter [2007].)

Biographical profiles

- "Billington, Michael". Who's Who 2007: An Annual Biographical Dictionary. London: A & C Black (Bloomsbury Publishing), 2007. ISBN 978-0-7136-7527-6 (159th edn). Online site: Who's Who 2008. Accessed 6 June 2008.
- "Featured Alumni: Michael Billington: Author and Arts Critic, St Catherine's College". University of Oxford, alumni.ox.ac.uk. Last updated 29 October 2007. Accessed 8 June 2008.
- "Michael Billington". Contemporary Writers in the UK. British Council. Copyright, 2007. Accessed 6 June 2008. (Searchable database.)
- Sleeman, Elizabeth. "Billington, Michael". International Who's Who of Authors and Writers 2004. London:Routledge, 2003. 55. ISBN 1-85743-179-0

Media participation and clips

- "Michael Billington" – On the BBC, including "Results from BBC Audio & Video" (RealMedia audio clips). Accessed 8 June 2008.
- "Michael Billington: Q&A". Pinter at the BBC. BBC Four. 6 November 2002. Accessed 8 June 2008. ("Harold Pinter's biographer Michael Billington answered your questions about the playwright on Wednesday 6 November 2002.")
