= Arthur Young (actor) =

English actor (1898–1959)

- in An Inspector Calls (1954)
- Born: Arthur Henry Young; 2 September 1898; Bristol, England
- Died: 24 February 1959 (aged 60); London, England
- Occupation: Actor
- Spouse: Beatrice Kane (m. 1924–1959)

Arthur Young (2 September 1898 – 24 February 1959) was an English actor, notable for roles including Gladstone in the 1951 The Lady with a Lamp. He can be seen as a window cleaner in the film Radio Parade of 1935. He regularly appeared in BBC radio plays and was a member of the Corporation’s Drama Repertory Company in the late 1950s. His stage work encompassed West End revue, as well as Stratford.

== Personal life ==
Young was born on 2 September 1898 in Bristol. His parents were Henry Young and Elizabeth Wales Young (1876–1972).

== Filmography ==
Year	Title	Role	Notes
1934	Lorna Doone	King's Messenger	Film debut (Uncredited)
1935	No Limit	Doctor	
1936	Wedding Group	Dr. Granger	
1937	Victoria the Great	William Gladstone	
1940	21 Days	Asher	
1943	San Demetrio London	Captain George Waite	
1945	I'll Be Your Sweetheart	Judge	Uncredited
1947	The Root of All Evil	Grice	
1948	My Brother Jonathan	Sir Joseph Higgins	
1949	Portrait from Life	Club Pianist	Uncredited
1949	The Perfect Alibi	Edward Carter	TV Movie
1949	The Singing Princess	Calif Oman	Voice
1950	The Twenty Questions Murder Mystery	Doctor	
1951	The Lady with a Lamp	William Gladstone	
1953	Isn't Life Wonderful!	Sir George Probus	
1954	John of the Fair	'Doc' Claydon	
1954	An Inspector Calls	Mr Birling	
1954	John Wesley	King George II	
1954	Five Days	Hyson	
1954	Misalliance	Mr. Tarleton	TV Movie
1954	Stranger from Venus	Scientist	
1955	No Smoking	Joe Dawson	
1956	The Gelignite Gang	Scobie	Final film
