= Michael Rennie =

British actor (1909–1971)

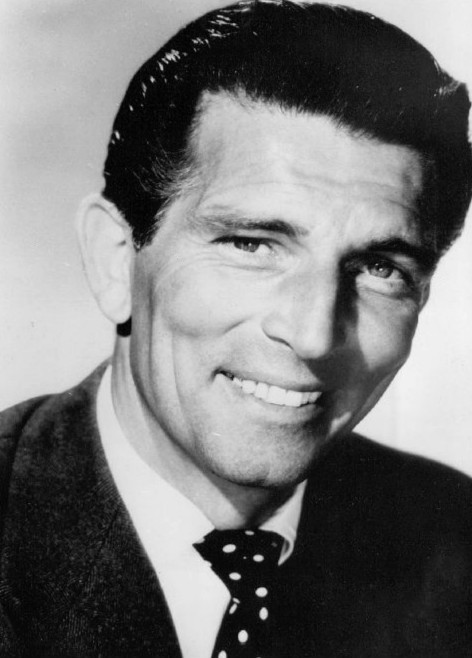
- Rennie in 1958
- Born: Eric Alexander Rennie; 25 August 1909; Idle, (Bradford) West Riding of Yorkshire, England
- Died: 10 June 1971 (aged 61); Harrogate, West Riding of Yorkshire, England
- Resting place: Harlow Hill Cemetery, Harrogate, North Yorkshire
- Education: The Leys School
- Occupation: Actor
- Years active: 1936–1971
- Spouses: Maggie McGrath (1919-2017) (m. 1947; div. 1960) Joan England (1912-1974) (m. 1938; div. 1945)
- Partner: Renee Taylor (née Gilbert)
- Children: 2

Michael Rennie (born Eric Alexander Rennie; 25 August 1909 – 10 June 1971) was a British film, television and stage actor who had leading roles in a number of Hollywood films, including his portrayal of the space visitor Klaatu in the science fiction film The Day the Earth Stood Still (1951). In a career spanning more than 30 years, Rennie appeared in more than 50 films and in several American television series.

== Early years and career ==
Rennie was born in Idle near Bradford, West Riding of Yorkshire, the second son of a Scottish wool mill owner, James Rennie, and his English wife Amelia (née Dobby). He had an elder brother William, younger brother Gordon and sister Edith. The Rennie business had operated for over 150 years, and the family was relatively well off. He was educated at the Leys School, Cambridge.

He went to work at the family mill in Bradford, but did not enjoy it. He worked in a number of occupations, including a stint as a car salesman, and sweeping floors in his uncle's steel ropes factory. He eventually decided (at the time of his 26th birthday, in 1935) on a career as an actor. He retained his surname but adopted Michael as his professional name. He cited Ronald Colman as his role model.

=== Early British films ===
The 6' 4" tall Rennie attracted the interest of a casting director at Gaumont British, who took him on as an extra. Rennie said entering the film industry at this level was a deliberate strategy, so he could learn how pictures were made. Head of production Michael Balcon said Rennie was taken on "because he was good-looking and athletic. He knew nothing of acting, but was given a contract to play small parts and to work as stand-in for players such as Robert Young and John Loder."

Rennie's first screen acting was an uncredited bit part in the Alfred Hitchcock film Secret Agent (1936), standing in for Robert Young. Balcon says he saw Rennie act in a scene in East Meets West (1936) and fired him immediately afterwards. Balcon wrote "I had seen the rushes of that day's filming and had at once decided that Rennie was far too inexperienced to justify big screen parts."

The 1937 screen test, which exists in the British Film Institute (BFI) archives under the title "Marguerite Allan and Michael Rennie Screen Test", did not lead to a film career for either performer.

Balcon says Rennie "took his setback well, left the studios, and went off to learn his job in repertory." Rennie worked mostly in Yorkshire, eventually becoming a star with the York Repertory Company. One of his roles was Professor Henry Higgins in Pygmalion.

He also played other bit parts and minor unbilled roles in other films, including The Man Who Could Work Miracles (1936), Conquest of the Air (1937), The Squeaker (1937), Gangway (1937), The Divorce of Lady X (1938), Bank Holiday (1938), This Man in Paris (1939) and The Briggs Family (1940). He later said he strove to perfect a "mid-Atlantic accent" that could easily be understood by American as well as British audiences which resulted in people thinking he was Canadian.

== World War II ==
=== Rising fame ===
Shortly after the outbreak of war in Europe on 1 September 1939, Rennie began to receive offers for larger film roles, including This Man Is Dangerous (1940), Dangerous Moonlight (1941) and Pimpernel Smith (1941). Rennie auditioned again for Michael Balcon, now head of Ealing Studios, and was cast in Ships with Wings.

While that film was being prepared, Rennie continued repertory work and accepted a one-line role in George Formby's Turned Out Nice Again. Balcon says Rennie "declared that he enjoyed it as he was playing a motor salesman, and this reminded him of the days when he tried to sell cars – without securing a single buyer."

Rennie had his first big film role in the suspense drama Tower of Terror (1941). This starred Wilfrid Lawson in the lead role as a crazed Dutch lighthouse keeper in the German-occupied Netherlands, while the second-billed Rennie and third-billed Movita had the romantic leads. In a 1951 interview Rennie said this was his worst part.

Michael Balcon also used him in The Big Blockade (1942). He was called a "rapidly rising newcomer". Another profile referred to him as an "athletic, Gable-ish young man."

=== War service ===
Rennie enlisted in the RAF Volunteer Reserve on 27 May 1941. "There has been a pause in Rennie's film career", wrote Balcon in 1942. "But there will be parts awaiting him when the war is over".

He was officially discharged on 4 August 1942, and then on the following day, he was commissioned "for the emergency" as pilot officer number 127347 on probation in the General Duties Branch of the RAFVR. On 5 February 1943, he was promoted to flying officer on probation. He resigned his commission on 1 May 1944 (not discharged on disability, as the studio publicity stated).

Rennie had carried out his basic training near Torquay in Devon, after which he was sent to the United States for fighter pilot training under the Arnold Plan. In this programme, pilots of the RAF were trained by United States Army Air Forces instructors. One of his fellow students was RAF Sergeant Jack Morton, who told an anecdote about when he and Rennie were in the same class:

At the end of our primary course we were posted to a Basic Flying School at Cochran Field, Macon, Georgia. The class which completed the course at Cochran Field was now split up, half were posted to Napier Field, Dothan, Alabama, to train on single-engine planes, and the remainder were posted to twin-engine schools. Like Cochran, Napier Field was a large permanent Air Corps Base and most of us were quite content to stay on the camp when we had time off. One of the cadets on our course had told us that he was a film actor, but no one took him seriously. We had to admit that he was right however when a film came to the camp cinema called Ships with Wings starring Michael Rennie.

== Film stardom ==
=== I'll Be Your Sweetheart and The Wicked Lady ===
With the end of the war in Europe in May 1945, Rennie was given his first film break, when he was cast alongside Margaret Lockwood—then at the peak of her popularity—in the musical I'll Be Your Sweetheart (1945), directed by Val Guest for Gainsborough Studios. Rennie was billed below Lockwood and Vic Oliver, given an "introducing" credit, but his character was the actual protagonist of the film. The movie was not a large hit, but Rennie received excellent notices, including a review from the US trade paper Variety which said his performance made the film "noteworthy" and that he was:

... likely Hollywood material... the best bet in the way of a new male star to have come out of a British studio in many years. Rennie not only has a lot on the ball as a straight lead, he knows the value of visual tricks. Femmes will go for him in a big way.

He followed this with another movie with Lockwood at Gainsborough, the costume adventure The Wicked Lady (1945). Rennie was billed fifth, beneath Lockwood, James Mason, Patricia Roc and Griffith Jones, but he played the one true love of Lockwood's character. It was the year's biggest box-office hit, subsequently ninth out of the ten highest-grossing British films of all time.

Rennie's prestige was also raised when he was given a single prominent scene as a commander of Roman centurions in Gabriel Pascal's production of George Bernard Shaw's Caesar and Cleopatra (also 1945), starring Vivien Leigh and Claude Rains. The film's expense caused it to lose a large amount of money, despite its being highly successful at the box office, particularly in the U.S.

Rennie was now established as a leading actor. One report called him "the bobbysoxers' dark idol... Gainsborough's 1945 discovery." He was mobbed by female fans on a personal appearance tour.

Gainsborough teamed him with one of their biggest female stars, Phyllis Calvert, in the melodrama The Root of All Evil (1947).

=== Maurice Ostrer ===
In July 1946 it was announced Rennie had signed a five-year contract with Maurice Ostrer's new company, Premiere Productions, worth £300,000, making him the highest paid film star in Britain. Rennie was first "loaned out" to another company for White Cradle Inn (1947), shot in Switzerland with Madeleine Carroll. Then he made his first film for Ostrer at Premiere, The Idol of Paris (1948). The film did so badly that Ostrer left the film industry.

Rennie made films for independent producers, and his career momentum began to fade: Uneasy Terms (1948); Golden Madonna (1949) (again with Calvert); and two comedies for Val Guest: Miss Pilgrim's Progress (1949) and The Body Said No! (1950). He did play one of two central characters in the 47-minute episode "Sanatorium", the longest of the Somerset Maugham tales constituting the omnibus film Trio (1950); the 40-year-old Rennie and the 20-year-old Jean Simmons play patients and doomed lovers in the title institution.

== Hollywood career ==
=== 20th Century Fox ===
Rennie was one of several English actors cast in the 20th Century Fox medieval adventure story The Black Rose (1950), shot in England starring Tyrone Power and Orson Welles. Rennie was specifically cast as the 13th-century King Edward I, whose 6 ft 2 in (1.88 m) frame gave origin to his historical nickname "Longshanks". He was fifth-billed after Cécile Aubry and Jack Hawkins. Rennie became good friends with Power, who spoke well of the actor to Fox executives.

Rennie's performance impressed Fox's studio head, Darryl F. Zanuck, who offered him a role in a film shot in Canada, The 13th Letter (1951). Directed by Otto Preminger, it was a remake of the French film Le Corbeau (The Raven, 1943), with the setting changed to the Canadian province of Quebec.

Fox was so pleased with Rennie's work that it offered him a seven-year contract in November 1950.

=== The Day the Earth Stood Still ===
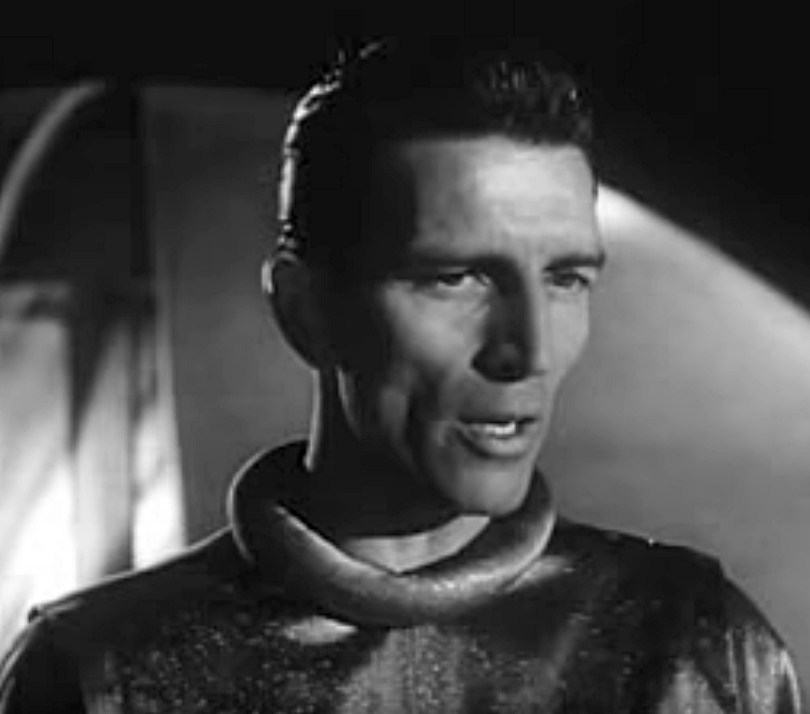
Rennie as Klaatu in The Day the Earth Stood Still.

After Claude Rains turned down the role, Rennie received top billing in his next film, The Day the Earth Stood Still (also 1951), the first postwar, large-budget, "A" science-fiction film. It was a serious, high-minded exploration of mid-20th century suspicion and paranoia, combined with a philosophical overview of humanity's coming place in the larger universe. Rennie said director Robert Wise told him to do the role "with dignity but not with superiority". (The story was later dramatised in 1954 on Lux Radio Theatre, with Rennie and Billy Gray recreating their original film roles. Seven years later, on 3 March 1962, when The Day the Earth Stood Still made its television premiere on NBC's NBC Saturday Night at the Movies, Rennie appeared in a two-minute introductory prologue before the start of the film.)

Rennie went on to support Power in I'll Never Forget You (1951) then had good roles in the ensemble drama Phone Call from a Stranger (1952) (where he played an American) and in the wartime spy thriller, 5 Fingers (1952), as the agent who tracks down James Mason's spy. He did some narration for The Desert Fox: The Story of Rommel (1951) and provided voiceovers for several Fox films, such as Pony Soldier (1952), Titanic (1953), The Desert Rats (1953) and Prince Valiant (1954).

=== Les Misérables ===
Buoyed by the strong critical reception and profitability of The Day the Earth Stood Still, Fox assigned much of the credit to the central performance of Rennie. Convinced that it had a potential leading man under contract, the studio decided to produce a new version of Les Misérables (1952) as a vehicle for him. The film was directed by Lewis Milestone, known for his early sound version of All Quiet on the Western Front. Rennie's performance was respectfully, but not enthusiastically, received by the critics. Ultimately, Les Misérables returned an extremely modest profit and put an end to any further attempts to promote the 43-year-old Rennie as a potential star. This caused the studio to cancel a project he was attached to in 1952—Arms of Venus.

He was, however, launched on a thriving career as a top supporting actor at Fox, often playing figures of authority, such as doctors or military officers.

=== Supporting actor at Fox ===
Rennie was second-billed in Sailor of the King (also known as Single-Handed, 1953), playing an admiral, as supporting actor to Jeffrey Hunter. He was the leading man to Jeanne Crain in a thriller, Dangerous Crossing (1953), which re-used sets and props from Titanic (also 1953), for which Rennie spoke the closing narration. He had a showy role as Saint Peter in The Robe (1953), the first movie in CinemaScope and the biggest hit of the year. The star was Richard Burton, who had essentially taken Rennie's place on the Fox lot as their "resident British star".

Rennie supported Tyrone Power once more in King of the Khyber Rifles (1954), as a brigadier in British India, then he played his first villain for Fox, an evil "Rama Khan" in the "eastern" Princess of the Nile (1954), opposite Jeffrey Hunter. He reprised his role as Peter in Demetrius and the Gladiators (1954) and was lent out for Mambo (1954).

In Désirée (1954), Rennie played the future Charles XIV John of Sweden opposite Marlon Brando as Napoleon Bonaparte. The film was popular although not as highly regarded as other Brando films from this time. Soldier of Fortune (1955), was another hit, with Rennie as a British police inspector in Hong Kong supporting Clark Gable and Susan Hayward.

On TV he played the attorney in an adaptation of The Letter (1955) with John Mills. He also received good reviews for his performance as an art dealer in the episode "A Man of Taste" (1955) for Climax! with Zsa Zsa Gabor. Rennie enjoyed live TV. "You have greater performances as opposed to those in a filmed series", he said. "You are able to build and sustain a role in live TV whereas you have the problem of cutting, stopping and starting in a filmed show."

Based on the positive reaction to his two turns as the Apostle Peter, Fox assigned him another third-billed, top-tier role as a stalwart man of God, Franciscan friar Junípero Serra, who, between 1749 and his death in 1784, founded missions in Alta California. The film was Seven Cities of Gold (1955), with Richard Egan and Anthony Quinn.

His next film was The Rains of Ranchipur (1955), assigned him fifth billing after the lead romantic teaming of Lana Turner and Richard Burton. As Turner's character's cuckolded husband, Lord Esketh, Rennie maintained his typical dignity and stiff upper lip. He supported Ginger Rogers in Teenage Rebel (1956) and had a good role as the man murdered by James Mason in Island in the Sun (1957), Darryl Zanuck's popular melodrama. His contract with Fox then wound up.

== Post–20th Century-Fox ==
Rennie began his freelancing career supporting Cornel Wilde in Omar Khayyam (1957) at Paramount. He returned to Britain to play the lead in a war film Battle of the V-1 (1958). He was going to co-produce and star in a war film for Eros Films about bomb disposal experts, Getaway, but it was not made.

Scheduling conflicts meant he missed out on a role in The Vikings (1958), being replaced by James Donald.

He had top billing in a mountaineering film for Disney, Third Man on the Mountain (1959), although he was really the support for James MacArthur.

Irwin Allen gave him a leading part at Fox, casting him as adventurer Lord John Roxton in an adaptation of Sir Arthur Conan Doyle's The Lost World (1960), a tale of a jungle expedition that finds prehistoric monsters in South America; the film also starred Claude Rains, Jill St. John and Richard Haydn. Then, no longer bound by the no-television clause in his studio contract, he began his association with the medium.

=== The Third Man and Mary Mary ===
Rennie became a familiar face on television, taking the role of Harry Lime in The Third Man (1959–65), an Anglo-American syndicated television series very loosely derived from the film. It ran for several years but the schedule meant Rennie had plenty of time off to work on other projects. "Every scene of every show I do for money", he said.

At the start of the 1960s, Michael Rennie made his only Broadway appearance in Mary, Mary playing Dirk Winsten, a jaded film star. After two previews, the sophisticated five-character marital comedy written by Jean Kerr and directed by Joseph Anthony opened at the Helen Hayes Theatre on 8 March 1961. It ran for a very successful 1,572 performances, closing at the Morosco Theatre on 12 December 1964. Rennie stayed with the production less than five months and was replaced by Michael Wilding in July 1961.

When Warner Bros. cast the film version in early 1963, Rennie, along with leading man Barry Nelson and supporting actor Hiram Sherman (who joined the play two years after the opening in the part first played by John Cromwell), were the only Broadway cast members to carry over. Debbie Reynolds was given the title role created by Barbara Bel Geddes, and Warner's contract player Diane McBain, whom the studio saw as a potential star of the future, took over "the socialite part" essayed by Betsy von Furstenberg. Mervyn LeRoy produced and directed the film, which opened at Radio City Music Hall on 25 October 1963.

Rennie was cast in a lead role in the comedy play Any Wednesday but left the project during out of town try outs. He was replaced by Don Porter and the play was a huge success.

== Later career ==
During the 1960s, Rennie made guest appearances on such series as The Barbara Stanwyck Show, The Americans, Route 66 (a portrayal of a doomed pilot in the two-part episode "Fly Away Home"); Alfred Hitchcock Presents; Perry Mason (one of four actors in four consecutive episodes substituting for series star Raymond Burr, who was recovering from surgery); Wagon Train (a 90-minute colour episode as an English big game hunter). He played in The Great Adventure, an anthology series about remarkable events in American history, he portrayed Confederate president Jefferson Davis. He played Daniel Boone in the episodes "The Sound of Wings" and "First in War, First in Peace"; Lost in Space (another two-part episode). He played an all-powerful alien zookeeper in "The Keeper." He worked one last time with his Third Man co-star Jonathan Harris; The Time Tunnel as Captain Smith of the Titanic, in the series' premiere episode. He played in Batman (as the villainous Sandman, in league with Julie Newmar's Catwoman). He was in three episodes of The Invaders (as a malign variation of the Klaatu persona, culminating in a parallel plot also involving an assembly of world leaders). He was in an episode of I Spy ("Lana"). He was in two episodes of The F.B.I.; and was a THRUSH agent in an episode of The Man From U.N.C.L.E. (1967 TV series) ("The Thrush Roulette Affair"/Barnaby Partridge).

=== Final films ===
Rennie's later films included Ride Beyond Vengeance (1966), Cyborg 2087 (1967) and the all-star Hotel (1967).

He completed what amounted to guest roles in two films, The Power and The Devil's Brigade as Lieutenant General Mark W. Clark (both 1968), before moving to Switzerland in the latter part of that year. His final seven feature films were filmed in Britain (Subterfuge (1968)), Italy (Death on the Run (1968) and The Young, the Evil and the Savage (1968)) and Spain (Giugno '44 – Sbarcheremo in Normandia AKA Seven into Hell (1968), The Battle of El Alamein (1969) as General Bernard Law Montgomery and Los Monstruos del Terror, also known as Dracula vs. Frankenstein (1970), then the Philippines (Surabaya Conspiracy AKA Stoney (1969)).

== Personal life ==
Rennie was married twice: first to Joan England, from 1938 to 1945, then to actress Margaret (Maggie) McGrath from 1947 to 1960; their son, David Rennie, is an English circuit judge in Lewes, Sussex, England. Both marriages ended in divorce. During the divorce hearing with his second wife, she fainted on the stand during cross-examination. Rennie revealed he had been separated from her since November 1953. (Her mother had been murdered in 1954.)

He had a son, John Marshall, with his longtime friend and mistress, Renée (née Gilbert), whose later married name was Taylor. Renée was the sister of the British film director Lewis Gilbert. During the war years, they lived coincidentally in flats in the White House in Albany Street near Regent's Park in London, (now a hotel). The White House was a favourite location to live during the war years. It was built in the shape of a white cross and was such a good navigation mark for the Luftwaffe that it was rumoured that there were standing orders to avoid bombing it, hence its popularity with celebrities and the wealthy.

Although Rennie offered to accept paternity on discovering the news of her pregnancy, Renée refused, as she was unwilling to jeopardise his growing success as a romantic lead in major feature films. However, Rennie kept a watchful eye on John Marshall over the years, even after his marriage to Maggie McGrath, and both families remained in constant touch until Rennie's death. In fact Renée and Maggie lived for many years in the 1970s and 1980s within 200 yards of each other in Barnes and were close friends. Both Michael Rennie and his sister Bunny were very fond of Renée's family. Coincidentally the British Film Institute's database lists Rennie as also having a son, John M. Taylor, who is described as "a producer." John Marshall Rennie used the pseudonym "Taylor" during his long career in the industry to avoid accusations of nepotism.

Michael Rennie was also briefly engaged to Mary Gardner, the former wife of Hollywood director Otto Preminger. In 1959, Preminger was divorcing Mary and claimed Rennie was having an affair with her.

In 1958, Rennie said he earned $117,000 a year which provided him with $36,000 net.

=== Death ===
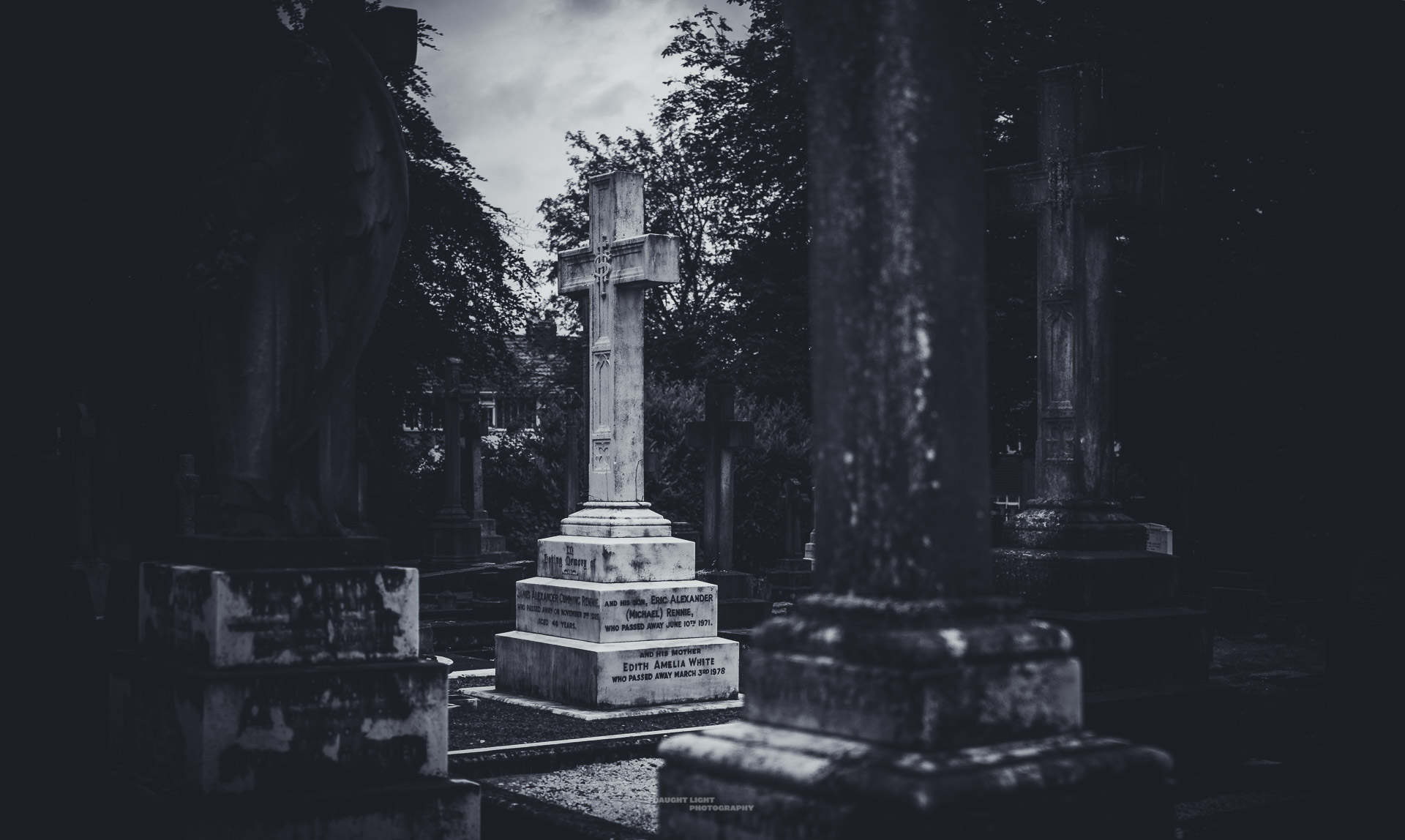
Michael Rennie's grave in Harlow Hill Cemetery, Harrogate, North Yorkshire

Within three years of leaving Hollywood, he journeyed to his mother's home in Harrogate, Yorkshire, following the death of his brother. It was there that he died on 10 June 1971. He was buried in Harlow Hill Cemetery in Harrogate.

His death has been variously attributed to heart attack, emphysema, an aortic aneurysm and to natural causes of death.

== Complete filmography ==
- Secret Agent (1936) as Army Captain (uncredited)
- The Man Who Could Work Miracles (1936) (uncredited)
- Conquest of the Air (1936) (uncredited)
- Gypsy (1937) (uncredited)
- Gangway (1937) as Ship's Officer (uncredited)
- The Squeaker (1937) as Medical Examiner (uncredited)
- The Divorce of Lady X (1938) (uncredited)
- Bank Holiday (1938) as Guardsman (uncredited)
- This Man in Paris (1939) (uncredited)
- The Briggs Family (1940) as Plainclothes Policeman (uncredited)
- This Man Is Dangerous (1941) as Inspector
- Turned Out Nice Again (1941) as Diner (uncredited)
- Dangerous Moonlight (1941) as Kapulski
- "Pimpernel" Smith (1941) as Prison Camp Officer (uncredited)
- Tower of Terror (1941) as Anthony Hale
- Ships with Wings (1942) as Lieutenant Maxwell
- The Big Blockade (1942) as Royal Air Force: George
- The Sky's the Limit (1943, Short) as George
- I'll Be Your Sweetheart (1945) as Bob Fielding
- The Wicked Lady (1945) as Kit Locksby
- Caesar and Cleopatra (1945) as 1st Centurion
- The Root of All Evil (1947) as Charles Mortimer
- White Cradle Inn (1947) as Rudolph
- Morning Departure (1948, TV Movie) as Lieutenant-Commander Stanford
- The Idol of Paris (1948) as Hertz
- Uneasy Terms (1948) as Slim Callaghan
- The Golden Madonna (1949) as Mike Christie
- Miss Pilgrim's Progress (1950) as Bob Thane
- Trio (1950) as Major Templeton (segment "Sanatorium")
- The Black Rose (1950) as King Edward
- The Body Said No! (1950) as himself
- The 13th Letter (1951) as Dr. Pearson
- The Day the Earth Stood Still (1951) as Klaatu
- The House in the Square, also known as I'll Never Forget You (1951) as Roger Forsyth
- The Desert Fox: The Story of Rommel (1951) as Narrator (uncredited)
- Phone Call from a Stranger (1952) as Dr. Robert Fortness
- Five Fingers (1952) as Colin Travers
- Les Misérables (1952) as Jean Valjean
- Pony Soldier (1952) as Ending Narrator (uncredited)
- Titanic (1953) as End Narrator (uncredited)
- The Desert Rats (1953) as narrator (uncredited)
- Sailor of the King (1953) as Lieutenant Richard Saville
- Dangerous Crossing (1953) as Dr. Paul Manning
- The Robe (1953) as Apostle Peter
- King of the Khyber Rifles (1953) as Brigadier General J. R. Maitland
- Prince Valiant (1954) as Narrator (uncredited)
- Princess of the Nile (1954) as Rama Khan
- Demetrius and the Gladiators (1954) as Peter
- Mambo (1954) as Enrico Marisoni
- Désirée (1954) as Jean-Baptiste Bernadotte
- Soldier of Fortune (1955) as Inspector Merryweather
- Seven Cities of Gold (1955) as Father Junipero Serra
- The Rains of Ranchipur (1955) as Lord Albert Esketh
- Teenage Rebel (1956) as Jay Fallon
- Island in the Sun (1957) as Hilary Carson
- Omar Khayyam (1957) as Hasani Sabah
- Battle of the V-1 (1958) as Stefan
- Third Man on the Mountain (1959) as Captain John Winter
- The Lost World (1960) as Lord John Roxton
- Mary, Mary (1963) as Dirk Winsten
- Mark Dolphin (1965, TV Movie)
- Ride Beyond Vengeance (1966) as Brooks Durham
- Mr. Paracelaus, Who Are You? (1966, TV Movie)
- Cyborg 2087 (1966) as Garth A7
- Hotel (1967) as Geoffrey – Duke of Lanbourne
- Death on the Run (1967) as Major Worthington Clark
- The Young, the Evil, and the Savage (1968) as Inspector Durand
- The Power (1968) as Arthur Nordlund
- The Devil's Brigade (1968) as General Mark Clark
- The Last Chance (1968) as George McConnell
- European Eye (1968, TV Movie) as Martin Purcell
- Giugno '44 – Sbarcheremo in Normandia (Seven into Hell) (1968) as Blynn
- Subterfuge (1968) as Goldsmith
- The Battle of El Alamein (1969) as General Bernard Law Montgomery
- Stoney (1969) as Harvey Ward
- Los Monstruos del Terror, also known as Dracula vs. Frankenstein (1970), as Dr. Odo Warnoff

== Partial list of TV appearances ==
- Wagon Train (1957 episode "The John Cameron Story") as John Cameron
- Alfred Hitchcock Presents (1958 episode "The Foghorn") as Allen Bliss
- Decision (1958 episode "The Tall Man") as Colonel T. J. Allan
- DuPont Show of the Month (1960 episode "The Scarlet Pimpernel") as Sir Percy Blakeney
- Route 66 (1961 episode "Fly Away Home") as Summers
- Alfred Hitchcock Presents (1962 episode "The Silk Petticoat") as Sir Humphrey J. Orford
- The Virginian (1963 episode "Vengeance Is the Spur") as Michael O'Rourke
- Perry Mason (1963 episode "The Case of the Libelous Locket") as Professor Edward Lindley
- The Alfred Hitchcock Hour (1963 episode "The Long Silence") as Ralph Manson
- Daniel Boone (1964 episode "The Sound of Wings") as Maj. Wellington
- Lost in Space (1965 two-part episode "The Keeper") as The Keeper
- Bonanza (1965 episode "Once a Doctor") as Professor Poppy / Dr. P. A. Mundy
- Batman (1966) as The Sandman – two episodes
- The Time Tunnel (1966 episode #1 "Rendezvous With Yesterday") as the Captain of the Titanic
- The F.B.I. (1967 episode "The Conspirators") as Conrad Letterman
- The Man from U.N.C.L.E. (1967 episode "The THRUSH Roulette Affair") as Barnaby Partridge
- The Invaders (1967 episode "The Innocent") as Magnus
- The Invaders (1968 two-part episode "Summit Meeting") as Vice Chancellor Pierre Alquist

== In popular culture ==
The Rocky Horror Show's opening song Science Fiction/Double Feature starts with the line:

Michael Rennie was ill the day the Earth stood still
