= The Magic Bow =

1946 film

- Italian theatrical poster
- Directed by: Bernard Knowles
- Written by: Roland Pertwee; Harry Ostrer (Scenario Editor); Norman Ginsbury (additional dialogue)
- Based on: The Magic Bow: a Romance of Paganini by Manuel Komroff
- Produced by: R. J. Minney
- Starring: Stewart Granger; Phyllis Calvert
- Cinematography: Jack Asher; Jack E. Cox
- Edited by: Alfred Roome
- Music by: Henry Geehl; Beethoven; Paganini; Edric Cundell (conductor)
- Production company: Gainsborough Pictures
- Distributed by: General Film Distributors (UK)
- Release date: 25 November 1946
- Running time: 106 minutes
- Country: United Kingdom
- Language: English
- Box office: 5,067 admissions (France)

The Magic Bow is a 1946 British musical film based on the life and loves of the Italian violinist and composer Niccolò Paganini. It was directed by Bernard Knowles. The film was entered into the 1946 Cannes Film Festival.

== Cast ==
- Stewart Granger as Niccolò Paganini
- Phyllis Calvert as Jeanne de Vermond
- Jean Kent as Bianca
- Dennis Price as Paul de la Rochelle
- Cecil Parker as Luigi Germi
- Felix Aylmer as Signor Fazzini
- Frank Cellier as Antonio
- Marie Lohr as Countess de Vermond
- Henry Edwards as Count de Vermond
- Mary Jerrold as Teresa Paganini
- Betty Warren as Landlady
- Anthony Holles as Manager
- David Horne as Rizzi
- Robert Speaight as Cardinal
- Charles Victor as Peasant Driver

== Production ==
The film was based on a 1941 book. Maurice Ostrer announced the project in July 1945.

The lead role was offered to James Mason who was excited to accept it and started practising the violin. However, when he read the script, he was disappointed to find it focused on Paganini's love life and turned it down. The part went to Stewart Granger.

Yehudi Menuhin was hired to perform the violin solos heard in the film. He arrived in London in May 1945 to record the tracks. In August it was announced Stewart Granger would play the lead role as part of his last two films for Gainsborough Pictures; the other project was Caravan. Phyllis Calvert was to be his co-star. Filming had to be postponed due to an illness to Phyllis Calvert, so Caravan was rushed into production and made first.

Phyllis Calvert's character was fictitious, a composite of various women who had helped Paganini.

The character of Bianca, the Italian singer, was real. Margaret Lockwood was originally announced to play the role, but was replaced by Jean Kent. Lockwood wrote in her memoirs that she felt it was "a very poor and unsuitable role... I was so offended by the script that, although I was under contract, I had made up my mind I would not accept it." At the suggestion of Phyllis Calvert they went to see J. Arthur Rank, who neither had met. Lockwood said "he was absolutely charming, heard both of us voice our opinions on various scripts, and, as far as I was concerned, upheld my determination not to accept the part of Bianca."

Kent later recalled "I had marvellous costumes in that bit not a very good part. You expect she [Bianca] is going to do something and she never does. It's a film that went wrong. Originally I believe they wanted Margaret Lockwood to play it. Presumably then it would have been a much better part, I don't know what happened. Bernard Knowles was a very good cameraman but not a director." (Kent routinely played roles devised for Lockwood.)

Producer R. J. Minner said that:

We are doing it [the film] as delicately as possible, as a study of sacred and profane love. Paganini's relationship with Bianca is rather a tricky business to get past the Hays Office, but we hope, with tact, to manage it. He knew Bianca all his life. He couldn't do it without her. She sang at all his concerts. He kept quarrelling with her and coming back to her. She made him ill and nearly killed him, and in the end he left her.

Granger was given two violin tutors. Menuhin used two violins and spent six weeks recording tracks.

== Reception ==
=== Box office ===
More traditional Gainsborough melodramas like The Wicked Lady and Caravan made the list of popular British films for 1946 but not The Magic Bow.

=== Critical reception ===
In their review, The New York Times concluded, "...the behind-the-scenes playing of Yehudi Menuhin as the violinist, drawing his magic bow over the compositions of Paganini, Tartini and Beethoven, is in itself almost worth the price of admission. Stewart Granger, playing Paganini, offers creditable make-believe as a violinist and does his best to play the man in a forthright manner. Considering the script, that is something of an accomplishment. Phyllis Calvert, as the other half of the romance, does well under the same handicaps, while Jean Kent and Dennis Price, aso [sic] facing script difficulties, do the best they can as a couple of jilted lovers. What few pleasant moments occur in the film — outside of the splendid musical sequences — fall to Cecil Parker as Paganini's manager. He presided over the two or three occasions when the audience laughed."

The film was entered in the 1946 Cannes Film Festival.
