= Theatre Book Prize =

The Theatre Book Prize is a prize given by the Society for Theatre Research annually.

== History ==
It was established to celebrate the Jubilee of the Society for Theatre Research (founded in Britain in 1948), and to encourage writing and publication of books on theatre history and practice—both those that present the theatre of the past and those that record contemporary theatre for the future. It was first awarded in 1998 for the best new theatre title published in English during 1997. It is now presented annually for a book on British or British related theatre that an independent panel of judges considers the best published in the preceding year.

== The judges ==
There are three judges, who are different each year. They are drawn from the ranks of people working in theatre: performers, directors, theatre critics, senior academics concerned with theatre, and theatre archivists.

== Criteria ==
All new works of original research first published in English are eligible, except for play texts and studies of drama as literature. The Prize embraces all aspects and genres of theatre from opera and ballet to circus and music hall, mime and puppetry as well as 'legitimate' forms and, as the list of previous winners shows, entries are drawn from right across the publishing spectrum.

== Prize winners ==
By year of publication

- 2023 Out for Blood: a Cultural History of Carrie the Musical by Chris Adams (Bloomsbury)
- 2022 An Actor's Life in 12 Productions by Oliver Ford Davies (Book Guild)
- 2021 Stirring up Sheffield by Colin and Tedd George (Wordville)
- 2020 Black British Women’s Theatre by Nicola Abram (Palgrave Macmillan)
- 2019 Dark Star: A Biography of Vivien Leigh by Alan Strachan (I B Tauris)
- 2018 Year of the Mad King: The Lear Diaries by Antony Sher (Nick Hern Books)
- 2017 Balancing Acts by Nicholas Hytner (Jonathan Cape)
- 2016 Stage Managing Chaos by Jackie Harvey with Tim Kelleher (McFarland)
- 2015 The Censorship of British Drama 1900-1968 by Steve Nicholson (University of Exeter Press)
- 2014 Oliver! by Marc Napolitano (Oxford University Press)
- 2013 The National Theatre Story by Daniel Rosenthal (Oberon)
- 2012 Mr Foote’s Other Leg by Ian Kelly (Picador)
- 2011 Covering McKellen: An Understudy's Tale by David Weston (Rickshaw Publishing)
- 2010 The Reluctant Escapologist by Mike Bradwell (Nick Hern Books)
- 2009 Different Drummer: The Life of Kenneth Macmillan by Jann Parry (Faber)
- 2008 Theatre and Globalisation: Irish Drama in the Celtic Tiger Era by Patrick Lonergan (Palgrave Macmillan)
- 2007 State of the Nation by Michael Billington (Faber)
- 2006 John Osborne: a patriot for us by John Heilpern (Chatto and Windus)
- 2005 1599: A Year in the Life of William Shakespeare by James Shapiro (Faber & Faber)
- 2004 Margot Fonteyn by Meredith Daneman (Penguin/Viking)
- 2003 National Service by Richard Eyre (Bloomsbury)
- 2002 A History of Irish Theatre 1601-2000 by Christopher Morash (Cambridge University Press)
- 2001 Reflecting the Audience: London Theatregoing, 1840-1880 by Jim Davis & Victor Emeljanow (University of Iowa Press/University of Hertfordshire Press)
- 2000 Politics, Prudery and Perversion.... Censorship 1906-68 by Nicholas de Jongh (Methuen)
- 1999 Garrick by Ian McIntyre (Allen Lane)
- 1998 Threads of Time by Peter Brook (Methuen)
- 1997 The Life of Margaret Ramsay, Play Agent by Colin Chambers (Nick Hern)
