= Idol of Paris =

The Idol of Paris
- Directed by: Leslie Arliss
- Written by: Stafford Dickens; Norman Lee; Harry Ostrer
- Based on: Paiva, Queen of Love (novel) by Alfred Schirokauer
- Produced by: R. J. Minney executive Maurice Ostrer
- Starring: Beryl Baxter; Michael Rennie; Christine Norden; Andrew Cruickshank; Kenneth Kent; Margaretta Scott; Miles Malleson
- Cinematography: Jack E. Cox
- Edited by: Bert Bates
- Music by: Mischa Spoliansky (composer), Louis Levy (musical director)
- Distributed by: Premier Productions Ltd; Warner Brothers (US)
- Release date: 1948
- Running time: 106 min
- Country: United Kingdom
- Language: English
- Budget: less than £100,000

Idol of Paris is a 1948 British drama film directed by Leslie Arliss and starring Beryl Baxter, Michael Rennie, Christine Norden and Andrew Cruickshank. It was written by Stafford Dickens, Norman Lee and Harry Ostrer, based on the 1935 novel Paiva, Queen of Love by Alfred Schirokauer, about a mid-19th century French courtesan Theresa who sleeps her way from poverty to the top of Second Empire society.

== Plot ==
In the 1860s, a woman rises from poverty to become the toast of Paris.

== Cast ==
- Beryl Baxter as Theresa
- Michael Rennie as Hertz, one of Theresa's lovers
- Christine Norden as Cora Pearl
- Miles Malleson as Offenbach
- Andrew Osborn as Antoine
- Andrew Cruickshank as Prince Nicholas
- Kenneth Kent as Emperor Napoleon III
- Margaretta Scott as Empress Eugenie
- Patti Morgan as Bellanger
- Genine Graham as Barucci
- Henry Oscar as Lachman
- Sybille Binder as Mrs. Lachman
- Leslie Perrins as Count Paiva
- Campbell Cotts as George Tremer Sr.
- John Penrose as George Cremer Jr.
- April Stride as Countess de Molney
- Donald Gray as Police Inspector
- June Holden as Marie
- Frederick Bradshaw as Chamberlain
- Marianne Stone as Theresa's secretary

== Production ==
The film was produced by Maurice Ostrer who moved into independent production after leaving Gainsborough Pictures. He set up his own company, Premier Productions, and made the film in association with R. J. Minney and Leslie Arliss who had all collaborated on The Wicked Lady (1945).

Filming started in August 1947. It was shot at MGM's British studios.

The cast includes Australian Patti Morgan, who Ostrer put under a seven-year contract.

== Reception ==
=== Critical ===
The Monthly Film Bulletin wrote that "the film is over-exaggerated in every detail and will appeal only to the very unsophisticated."

Kine Weekly wrote: "Its rags-to-riches tale is magnificently staged, but the very fine sets fail to conceal the unevenness of the acting or the ingenuousness of its drama and sentiment. ...The play is incredibly hammy in the first half and, in spite ol the range and splendour or its settings, very nearly borders on burlesque. Fortunately, the acting, direction and dialogue improve as the extravagant tale progresses, and towards the finish some genuine wit and excitement are sandwiched between its music and mush."

Variety said Ostrer "forgot that recent successful mellers leaned on stars for clicks with this 'first independent production. He boasts that the team that made his Wicked Lady has turned out this picture, but he has no James Mason and no Margaret Lockwood to carry the burden of an ill-written, corny script, Instead, he has comparative newcomers, who unfortunately do not merit leads in an ambitious picture. Its boxoffice prospects are dim. It would be a waste to export it to America."

Historian Alan Wood wrote "it aimed straight at the box-office by repeating the Gainsborough formula of salacity and sadism, but carried both so far that the result became merely silly."

Leslie Halliwell said: "Unintentionally hilarious copy of the Gainsborough period romances which had been so popular; much criticised because the leading ladies fight a duel with whips, but that's the least of its faults."

=== Box office ===
The movie was not a financial success and led to Maurice Ostrer quitting the film business for good. He cancelled plans to make a film Wild Marriage and dropped eight artists who he had under contract.

The careers of Leslie Arliss and Beryl Baxter never recovered either.
