= I'll Be Your Sweetheart =

- Original British trade ad
- Directed by: Val Guest
- Written by: Val Valentine; Val Guest additional dialogue Edward Percy
- Based on: original story by Valentine and Guest
- Produced by: associate Louis Levy executive Maurice Ostrer
- Starring: Margaret Lockwood; Vic Oliver; Michael Rennie; Peter Graves
- Cinematography: Phil Grindrod
- Edited by: Alfred Roome
- Music by: Louis Levy
- Production company: Gainsborough Pictures
- Distributed by: General Film Distributors
- Release date: 30 July 1945
- Running time: 104 minutes
- Country: United Kingdom
- Language: English

I'll Be Your Sweetheart is a 1945 British historical musical film directed by Val Guest and starring Margaret Lockwood, Vic Oliver and Michael Rennie. It was written by Val Valentine, Guest and Edward Percy, and was the only musical film produced by Gainsborough Studios.

Commissioned by the British Ministry of Information, it is set at the beginning of the 20th century, and is about the composers of popular music hall songs fighting for a new copyright law that will protect them from having their songs stolen.

== Plot ==
In 1900 Bob Fielding arrives in London from the north of England determined to make it as a song publisher. He visits a music hall where he hears Edie Story singing "Oh Mr Porter" by George Le Brunn.

Songwriters Kahn and Kelly sell their latest song, "I'll Be Your Sweetheart" to Jim Knight, who also wants to be a publisher. Knight doesn't give them an advance so they sell it to Jim. This causes a rivalry between Bob and Jim, which is increased when both men fall in love with Edie.

Bob leads a movement to smash the music pirates. He asks Edie to speak out against them but she refuses, reluctant to get involved with what she sees is a political issue. However, when composer Le Brunn dies impoverished, Edie makes an on-stage appeal to her audience to fight piracy.

Eventually the copyright bill is passed with the help of MP T.P. O'Connor. Bob leads a group of song writers to smash the printing presses of the pirates, resulting in a large brawl where Bob and his allies are victorious.

Bob and Edie decide to get married. Bob and Jim bury the hatchet as the copyright bill is passed.

== Cast ==
- Margaret Lockwood as Edie Story
- Vic Oliver as Sam Kahn
- Michael Rennie as Bob Fielding
- Peter Graves as Jim Knight
- Moore Marriott as George Le Brunn
- Frederick Burtwell as Pacey
- Garry Marsh as Wallace
- George Merritt as T.P. O'Connor
- Muriel George as Mrs Le Brunn
- Ella Retford as Dresser
- Joss Ambler as Dugan
- Eliot Makeham as John Friar
- Maudie Edwards as Mrs Jones
- Jonathan Field as Kelly
- Deryck Guyler as politician
- Gordon McLeod as Prime Minister
- Arthur Young as Judge
- Dave Crowley as 1st henchman
- Alf Goddard as 2nd henchman
- Jack Vyvian as 3rd henchman

== Production ==
The film was based on the real life copyright battles of Abbott and Preston in the early 1900s. Val Guest, the writer-director, was familiar with these struggles having been a former songwriter.

Margaret Lockwood's singing voice was dubbed by Maudie Edwards. Michael Rennie went to see Val Guest for a small role and Guest decided to make him the male lead.

Vic Oliver was billed above the title, just below Margaret Lockwood. However his role was fairly minor. It was the first major part for Michael Rennie who is given an "and introducing" credit in the film's opening credits.

It was the last film Val Guest made under his contract with Gainsborough. He says the film was made while the Blitz was on.

== Songs ==
- "I'll Be Your Sweetheart" (Harry Dacre)
- "Oh! Mr Porter" (Thomas Le Brunn, George Le Brunn)
- "Honeysuckle and the Bee" (W.H. Penn, A.H. Fitz)
- "I Wouldn't Leave My Little Wooden Hut" (Tom Mellor, Charles Collins)
- "Liza Johnson" by (George Le Brunn, Edgar Bateman)
- "I'm Banking Everything On You", "Sooner or Later" and "Mary Anna" (Manning Sherwin, Val Guest)

== Reception ==
Lockwood later wrote the film "had a vigorous period story – based on true facts – and I could never understand why it received such harsh handling from the critics. The public loved it, however – that was the main thing."

=== Box office ===
According to Kinematograph Weekly the film performed well at the British box office in 1945, and called the film, along with The Seventh Veil, Madonna of the Seven Moons, and They Were Sisters "four dazzling examples of the box office wizardry of (Gainsborough) Ostrer."

=== Critical ===
The Monthly Film Bulletin wrote: "One who emerges from the production with full marks is Margaret Lockwood, who refuses to be dominated by the limitations and produces a vigorous, sympathetic performance much better than her role."

In the Radio Times, David Parkinson wrote, "Val Guest directs with brio, but the songs he's saddled with are decidedly second-rate";

In The Independent, Tom Vallance described the film as an "under-rated musical... a film that combined the pace and vitality of the best Fox musicals with a trenchant look at flourishing music piracy at the turn of the century."

Filmink called it "quite fun".

Copyright scholar Adrian Johns has called the film "propaganda" and "a one-dimensional account of the piracy crisis [about sheet music in the early 20th century] from the publishers' perspective", but also highlighted its value as historical document, with large parts of the dialogue "closely culled from the actual raids, court cases, and arguments of 1901–1905."

== Adaptation ==
The film was adapted for radio on the BBC in 1945.

== Bibliography ==
- Harper, Sue. Picturing the Past: The Rise and Fall of the British Costume Film. British Film Institute, 1994.
- Murphy, Robert. Realism and Tinsel: Cinema and Society in Britain, 1939-1949. Routledge, 1989.
