= The Man Who Disappeared (1951 film) =

British television mystery film

- Genre: Crime; Horror; Mystery
- Based on: The Man with the Twisted Lip by Arthur Conan Doyle
- Directed by: Richard M. Grey
- Starring: John Longden; Campbell Singer
- Country of origin: United Kingdom
- Original language: English

Production
- Producer: Rudolph Cartier
- Running time: 26 minutes
- Production companies: Dryer & Weenolsen Productions

Original release
- Release: April 1951

The Man Who Disappeared (a.k.a. Sherlock Holmes: The Man Who Disappeared) is a 1951 British made-for-television mystery film directed by Richard M. Grey and starring John Longden as Sherlock Holmes and Campbell Singer as Dr. John H. Watson. The movie is based on Arthur Conan Doyle's 1891 Sherlock Holmes story "The Man with the Twisted Lip". It was the first British attempt to create a Sherlock Holmes television series.

== Production ==
The initial plan was to make six, one-hour adaptations but only one film was made and it was ultimately released cinematically. It was filmed both on location in London and on various studio sets.

== Cast ==
- John Longden as Sherlock Holmes
- Campbell Singer as Dr. John H. Watson
- Hector Ross as Neville St. Clair
- Ninka Dolega as Kate St. Clair
- Beryl Baxter as Doreen
- Walter Gotell (billed as Walther) as Luzatto

== Reception ==
The film was not well regarded upon release with one reviewer saying "This three-reeler is directed and acted in a most shoddy manor and the plot development moves at some points at the most startling speed." Kinematograph described the direction as "uninspired" causing the film "to border on the burlesque."
