= Magdalen King-Hall =

English novelist, journalist and children's fiction writer

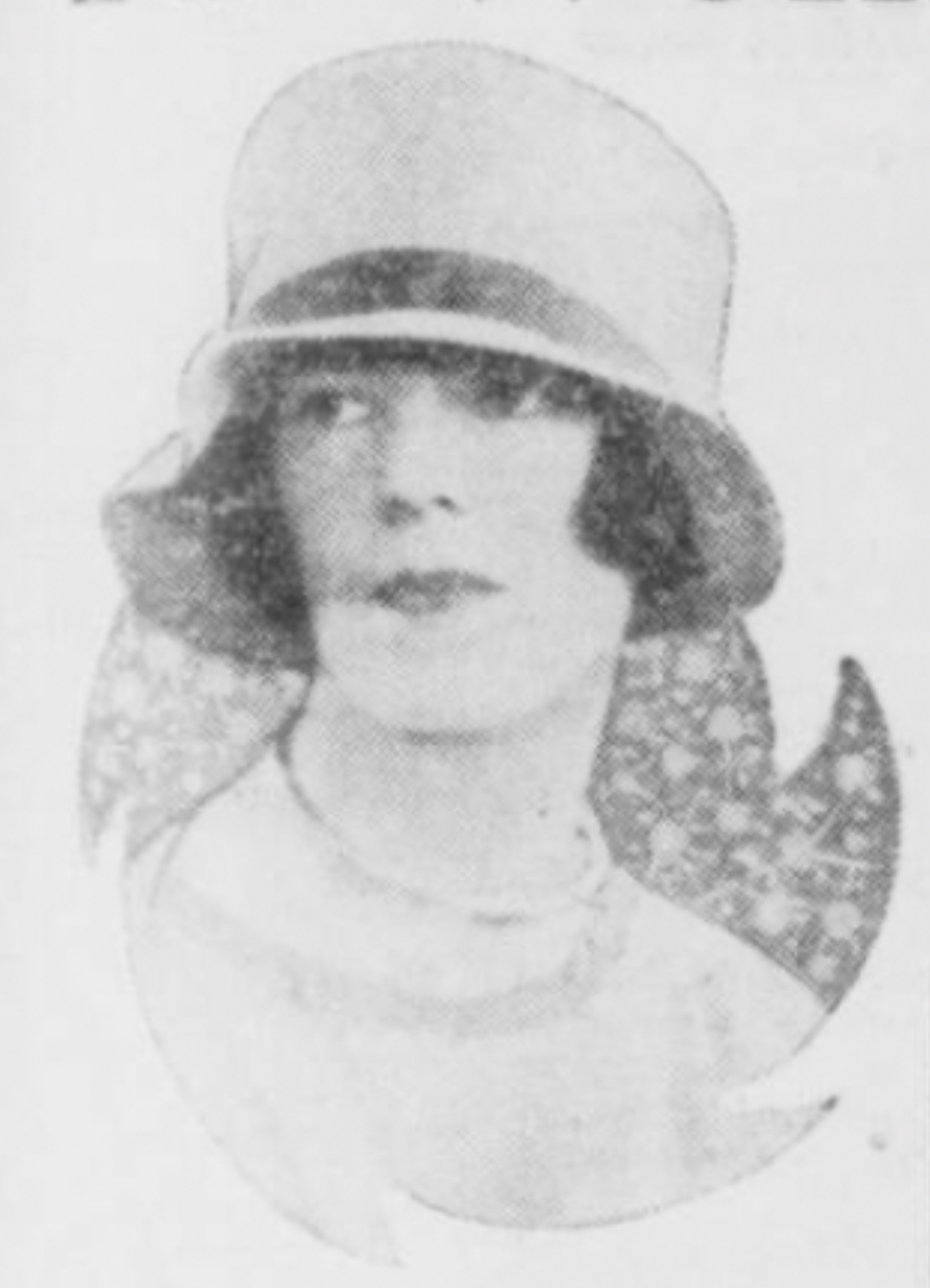
- Sunday Express, 1927
- Born: 22 July 1904; Chelsea, London, England
- Died: 1 January 1971 (aged 66); Hemel Hempstead, Hertfordshire, England
- Occupations: Writer, novelist, journalist
- Spouse: Patrick Perceval Maxwell
- Children: two sons, one daughter
- Writing career
- Pen name: Cleone Knox
- Genres: Fiction, novels, children's fiction

Magdalen King-Hall (22 July 1904 – 1 January 1971) was an English novelist, journalist and children's fiction writer. Her novel Life and Death of the Wicked Lady Skelton was made into a film twice: The Wicked Lady (1945), starring Margaret Lockwood and James Mason, and the 1983 remake, also called The Wicked Lady, starring Faye Dunaway and Alan Bates.

== Life ==
Born in Chelsea, Magdalen King-Hall was the daughter of Admiral Sir George Fowler King-Hall and sister of Stephen King-Hall. Her sister Olga Elizabeth Louisa King-Hall published the near-future speculative fiction novel Fly Envious Time (1944) under the name Lou King-Hall.

== Publications ==
=== Novels ===
- Diary of a Young Lady of Fashion 1764-5. (1924) New edition – London: Elek, 1967.
- I Think I Remember, Being the Random Recollections of Sir Wickham Woolicomb, An ordinary English snob and gentleman. London: Thornton Butterworth, 1927.
- Gay Crusaders. London: Peter Davies, 1934. An historical novel set at the end of the 12th century, about the 3rd Crusade.
- Maid of Honour. London: Peter Davies, 1936. The background is 16th century England and Ireland.
- Lady Sarah: A Novel. London: Peter Davies, 1939. Set in the 2nd half of the 18th century, this romantic historical novel, tells the story of Lady Sarah Lennox, daughter of the Duke of Richmond.
- Lord Edward. London: Peter Davies, 1943. A novel about the united Irish Leader, Lord Edward Fitzgerald and his wife Pamela.
- Life And Death of the Wicked Lady Skelton. (1945) University of Hertfordshire Press, 2016. Based on actual events in the 17th century, this is the story of Barbara Skelton, her secret partnership with a highwayman and her appalling crimes.
- How Small a Part of Time. London: Peter Davies, 1945. Sub-titled: 'The biography of the two beautiful Miss Lynch's of Cabragena.' The story is based on the lives of the Coughlan sisters of Ardo House near Ardmore.
- Lady Shane's Daughter. London: Peter Davies, 1947. When Lady Shane separated from her husband in 1787, she went with her daughter Lucilla to live in Europe, in Paris, Venice, Russia and Germany.
- Tea At Crumbo Castle. London: Peter Davies, 1949. The narrator is invited to tea at Crumbo Castle by old Mrs Toye and there sees the ghost of a young woman. The rest of the book is a flash back to 1878.
- The Fox Sisters. London: Peter Davies, 1950. A reconstruction of the lives of two sisters who lived in New England in the 1840s, who became notorious as professional mediums.
- Venetian Bride. London: Peter Davies, 1954. Ireland and Venice in the 18th century form the background of this love story about Ned Gascoigne who inherits his father's title, estate and debts.
- Hag Khalida. London: Peter Davies, 1954. Hag Khalida was the name of a house on the Sudan Cotton Plantation. A young married couple move in, and the story tells how a tragedy re-enacts itself.
- 18th Century Story. London: Peter Davies, 1956. Founded on the fact, this novel is packed with drama and incident including an elopement and a duel. The last trial of a nobleman by his peers in the Irish House of Lords in Dublin forms a fitting climax.
- The Noble Savages. London: Geoffrey Bles, 1962. The eccentric Landlord Mr Crumlin tries out Rousseau's educational theories when his sweet-heart's son Jonathan is left in his care. The setting is on the Blackwater in Co. Waterford and in Brighton.

=== Children's fiction ===
- Jehan of the Ready Fists. London: Newnes, [1936.] Also published as a Puffin Story Book in 1944. A story for children set during the 3rd Crusade at the time of Richard the Lionheart.
- Sturdy Rogue. London: T. Nelson & Sons, 1941. A children's book set in Elizabethan England.

=== Non-fiction ===
- Somehow Overdone: A Sudan scrapbook. London: Peter Davies, 1942. The author's memoirs of her time in the Sudan, where her husband worked for the Sudan Cotton Plantation Syndicate.
- The Edifying Bishop. London: Peter Davies, 1951. The story of the eccentric Frederick Hervey, Earl of Bristol and Bishop of Derry.
- Story of the Nursery. London: Routledge & Kegan Paul: London, 1958. A history of the Nursery from the Middle Ages to the present day.

== Sources ==
- British Library Catalogue at www.bl.uk.
- Waterford County Museum – The Ardmore Journal: http://www.waterfordcountymuseum.org/exhibit/web/Display/article/166/
