= Madonna of the Seven Moons =

1945 British film by Arthur Crabtree

- UK promotional poster
- Directed by: Arthur Crabtree
- Screenplay by: Roland Pertwee
- Based on: The Madonna of Seven Moons; 1931 novel by Margery Lawrence
- Produced by: R. J. Minney
- Starring: Phyllis Calvert; Stewart Granger
- Cinematography: Jack E. Cox
- Edited by: Lito Carruthers
- Music by: Hans May
- Production company: Gainsborough Pictures
- Distributed by: Eagle-Lion Distributors
- Release dates: 22 January 1945; 1947 (France)
- Running time: 110 minutes
- Country: United Kingdom
- Language: English
- Budget: £125,000
- Box office: over £1 million or over £300,000; 675,949 admissions (France)

Madonna of the Seven Moons is a 1945 British drama film starring Phyllis Calvert, Stewart Granger and Patricia Roc. Directed by Arthur Crabtree for Gainsborough Pictures, the film was produced by Rubeigh James Minney, with cinematography from Jack Cox and screenplay by Roland Pertwee. It was one of the Gainsborough melodramas of the mid-1940s popular with WW2-era female audiences.

== Plot ==
1910. Florence convent schoolgirl Maddalena is raped by a gypsy while picking flowers. In 1919 she leaves the convent to marry Giuseppe Labardi in Rome and has a daughter, Angela. In 1940, Angela returns to Rome after five years in school in England. She discovers her mother sometimes behaves oddly and once vanished for a year. A gigolo she's met, Sandro Barruci, turns up at her birthday party. Maddalena faints, and that night puts on gypsy clothing, draws seven moons on her mirror and vanishes again. She reappears at the House of the Seven Moons in a seedy part of Florence, where she's welcomed as Rosanna, mistress of gypsy thief Nino (Sandro's brother), whom she'd met during her earlier disappearance. The Labardis' family doctor, Ackroyd, guesses early trauma has left her with a dual personality, with neither half knowing about the other. Sandro goes to Florence with Angela to search for her mother, but drugs her and tries to rape her. Maddalena finds them and, thinking he's Nino being unfaithful, stabs him; he does the same to her. Maddalena is reunited with Angela before dying; Nino comes to her deathbed jealously planning to kill Giuseppe, but changes his mind when he realises they were married.

== Cast ==
- Phyllis Calvert as Maddalena Labardi
- Stewart Granger as Nino Barucci
- Patricia Roc as Angela Labardi
- Peter Glenville as Sandro Barucci
- John Stuart as Giuseppe Labardi
- Nancy Price as Mama Barucci
- Reginald Tate as Doctor Charles Ackroyd
- Jean Kent as Vittoria
- Peter Murray-Hill as Jimmy Logan
- Dulcie Gray as Nesta Logan
- Alan Haines as Evelyn
- Hilda Bayley as Mrs. Fiske
- Evelyn Darvell as Millie Fiske
- Amy Veness as Tessa
- Robert Speaight as Priest
- Eliot Makeham as Bossi
- Danny Green as Scorpi
- Helen Haye as Mother Superior

== Background ==
Film rights to the 1931 Margery Lawrence novel were bought by Gaumont British in 1938, which wanted to turn it into a vehicle for Renée Saint-Cyr as part of an ambitious slate for Gainsborough in 1939. However the advent of World War II disrupted these plans, and Madonna was put on the backburner.

The project was re-activated in 1944 following the box office successes of The Man in Grey and Fanny by Gaslight. Vernon Sewell said he was going to direct A Place of One's Own but was told to do Madonna of the Seven Moons instead and refused. The movie wound up being the first film directed by Arthur Crabtree. He had spent many years previously working for Gainsborough as a cinematographer. Phyllis Calvert later recalled:

Arthur was a very good cinematographer, but there weren't enough directors, and so people who were scriptwriters or were behind the camera were suddenly made directors. It wasn't that Crabtree was an unsatisfactory director, just that we found ourselves very satisfactory – we did it ourselves. But the fact that he had been a lighting cameraman was wonderful for us, because he knew exactly how to photograph us.

Academic Sue Harper later wrote an analysis of the film, where she attributed producer R.J. Minney as being the main creative force behind it. The story, which is supposed to be based on a real case history, begins with a rather explicit suggestion of rape of a devout, convent-educated young woman that causes her to develop split personalities. Calvert, who played Patricia Roc's mother, was only four months her senior in real life.

Filmink dubbed Jean Kent the "back up Margaret Lockwood".

== Reception ==
=== Box office ===
The movie was very popular at the British box office, being one of the most seen films of its year. In 1946, readers of the Daily Mail voted the film their third most popular British movie from 1939 to 1945.

Kinematograph Weekly called The Seventh Veil, Madonna of the Seven Moons, They Were Sisters and I'll Be Your Sweetheart "four dazzling examples of the box office wizardry of (Gainsborough) Ostrer." It was called "the film of the month" at the British box office in January 1945.

It was the only British film among the ten most popular films of 1946 in Australia.

In Latin America the film earned $282,367.

Stewart Granger later called the film "terrible".

=== US release ===
British films had not traditionally performed well in the US, but screenings to American soldiers in Britain led J. Arthur Rank to feel that Madonna of the Seven Moons would do well there. It became the first of a series of Rank films distributed in the US by Universal.
