= Beryl Baxter =

British actress (1926–2012)

- Born: Beryl Mavis Ivory; 8 April 1926; Birmingham, England, UK
- Died: 29 November 2012 (aged 86); Wimbledon, London, England, UK
- Occupation: Actress
- Years active: 1948–1971
- Spouse: Bernard A. Gross (1952–19??)

Beryl Baxter (8 April 1926 – 29 November 2012) was a British film actress whose career spanned the 1940s to the 1970s.

== Early and personal life ==
Beryl Ivory was born in Birmingham, England on 8 April 1926. Adopting the stage name Beryl Baxter, she had hopes of becoming the new Margaret Lockwood. She made her film debut in 1948, taking a leading role in Idol of Paris. She married Bernard Gross in 1952.

== Filmography ==
- The Idol of Paris – Theresa (1948)
- The Man Who Disappeared – Doreen (1951)
- Counterspy – (uncredited; 1953)
- The Mayerling Affair – Princess Stephanie (1956)
- Encounter (TV series) – Pamela Brooks (one episode: "Depth 300"; 1958)
- Charles Tupper: The Big Man – (1961)
- The Avengers (TV series) – Helen Rayner (one episode: "The Outside-In Man"; 1964)
- The Protectors – Miss. Nicholson (one episode: "The Stamp Collection"; 1964)
- Undermind (TV series) – Veronica (one episode: "End Signal"; 1965)
- Love Story (TV series) – Ivy Burns (one episode: "The Sad Smile of the Mona Lisa"; 1965)
- Thirteen Against Fate – Madame Fabien (one episode, entitled 'The Son') (1966)
- Detective (TV Series) – Mrs. Stephenson (one episode, entitled 'The Public School Murder') (1969)
- Crime of Passion (TV series) – Mme. Juhan (episode: "Magdalena"; 1971)
