= The Root of All Evil (1947 film) =

- Theatrical release poster
- Directed by: Brock Williams
- Written by: Brock Williams
- Based on: The Root of All Evil (1921) by J. S. Fletcher
- Produced by: Harold Huth
- Starring: Phyllis Calvert; Michael Rennie
- Cinematography: Stephen Dade
- Edited by: Charles Knott
- Music by: Bretton Byrd
- Production company: Gainsborough Pictures
- Distributed by: General Film Distributors
- Release date: 5 February 1947
- Running time: 110 minutes
- Country: United Kingdom
- Language: English
- Budget: over $1 million or £155,000
- Box office: £90,700

The Root of All Evil is a 1947 British drama film, directed by Brock Williams for Gainsborough Pictures and starring Phyllis Calvert and Michael Rennie. The film was the first directorial assignment for Williams, who was better known as a screenwriter, and also produced the screenplay based on the 1921 novel of the same name by J. S. Fletcher.

It was one of the less successful Gainsborough melodramas.

== Plot ==
Jeckie Farnish has grown up in a grindingly poor household, and as she reaches adulthood falls in love with a local grocers son. She is loved by her childhood playmate Joe Bartle, but takes him for granted and feels that he lacks the spark or ambition to match her determination to make something of herself. Instead she pursues Albert Grice, son of a wealthy grocery store owner, and believes they have an understanding. She is horrified when Albert goes on holiday and returns newly married to another woman, heartbroken, she resolves to do whatever is necessary to claw her way out of poverty.

Seeing a possible payday as compensation for her disappointment, Jeckie sues Albert for breach of promise and emotional distress, and after she plays up her status as jilted victim to a local lawyer, she is awarded a considerable out of court settlement for damages. Seeing the chance for revenge, she uses her windfall to set up her own grocery store, directly opposite that of the Grice emporium. By undercutting on prices and offering customer perks, she soon succeeds in poaching nearly all of their business and starts to accumulate a tidy sum in profits. Her ambition however stretches beyond a grocery store and its relatively modest financial potential. She is intrigued to meet a handsome stranger Charles Mortimer, who tells her that there are large deposits of oil on the edge of town and he is looking for a financial backer to help him exploit them.

Jeckie agrees to throw her lot in with Charles to get their hands on the land under which the oil can be drilled. It belongs to an elderly man Scholes, who is of the opinion that it is a stony, barren and useless plot, and is happy to sell for what seems on the surface a generous price. The oil operation quickly proves to have huge financial potential, and soon becomes a sizeable industry raking in vast profits. Now a wealthy woman, Jeckie buys the grandest house in the area and lives a life of luxury. She has fallen in love with Charles, but when she learns that he has misled her and is in fact married, she orders him to leave and says he will get no more share of the profits.

Meanwhile, Scholes' resentment at being swindled had been simmering in the background, and finally explodes when he decides to set fire to the refinery to exact his revenge. The whole operation is destroyed in a spectacular blaze. Faced with losing everything, Jeckie finally starts to analyse her own ruthlessness and avarice. She realises that she has made many enemies and has few real friends. But the faithful Joe has never criticised or judged her, and she finally sees that he was the man for her all along.

== Cast ==
- Phyllis Calvert as Jeckie Farnish
- Michael Rennie as Charles Mortimer
- John McCallum as Joe Bartle
- Brefni O'Rorke as Farnish
- Moore Marriott as Scholes
- Hazel Court as Rushie Farnish
- Hubert Gregg as Albert Grice
- Arthur Young as George Grice
- Reginald Purdell as Perkins
- Stewart Rome as Sir George
- George Carney as Bowser
- George Merritt as landlord
- Ellis Irving as auctioneer

== Production ==
It was the first English movie for Australian actor John McCallum. He tested for a small part but was given the second male lead instead.

The film was initiated by Maurice Ostrer who put McCallum under personal contract. During filming, Ostrer left Gainsborough.

Filming started in February 1946. The film was one of a number of expensive dramas financed by J. Arthur Rank with budgets over $1 million.

== Reception ==
=== Box office ===
The film earned producer's receipts in the UK of £71,300 and overseas of £19,400.

=== Critical ===
The Monthly Film Bulletin wrote: "Better characterisation and motivation might have made this plot just palatable, but nothing could overcome the heavy-handed narrative style evident in the scripting, direction and cutting. The production department produces a spectacular oil-refinery fire, but, again, inept handling robs it of most of its dramatic value. Phyllis Calvert puts a great deal into a weak part and she is competently supported by an experienced cast, including a newcomer, Joe McCallum, who promises to be an interesting addition to England's male leads."

Variety wrote: "Pedestrian in production, it savors of those dramas of the twenties when feminine emancipation was quite a topic. Film never actually leaves the covers of the novel, and with suitable sub-titling and appropriate music it could have passed for a period piece. ... Michael Rennie, as the engineer, shows star potentialities. Given the right grooming and the proper parts – he is now under contract to Maurice Ostrer – he should become marquee value. Rest of the cast is adequate, but with all their talents and all the goodwill in the world, they couldn't breathe life into the yarn."

The Irish Times called it "a slightly turgid film of the kind of book one reads only during a long convalescence."
