= R. J. Minney =

British film producer and writer (1895–1979)

Rubeigh James Minney (29 August 1895 – 5 January 1979) was a British film producer, journalist, playwright, editor and author. He was author of over 40 books including novels and biographies. As a film-maker and film producer, he worked with British film companies such as Gainsborough Pictures, and was invited to Hollywood by Darryl F. Zanuck. He was also a journalist in India and London, and editor of several newspapers.

== Early life and education ==
Rubeigh James was the son of JR Minney and was born in Calcutta, India on 29 August 1895. Often known as "RJ", he was educated at St. Paul's School, Darjeeling, and studied history at King's College London, but left in 1914 to join the Indian Army.

== Career ==
He was on the editorial staff of The Pioneer in Allahabad and The Englishman in Calcutta, where he also represented The Times. He was a special reporter attached to the staff of the Duke of Connaught for the opening of India's first Parliament in 1920. In London, he was a drama critic for the Daily Chronicle, Sunday News and Everybody's Weekly (1925–1935); he was also director of Everybody's Publication Ltd (until 1935), where he eventually became editor. Furthermore, he was managing editor of The Sunday Referee (1935–39); editor of The Era, War Weekly, which was published from October 1939 to August 1941 by Newnes, and eventually stopped only because of the shortage of paper; and The Strand Magazine (1941–42), to which many famous writers contributed. He also wrote for the Daily Express. Minney was listed as editor of Men Only in 1955, published by Newnes, and there was a tie-in book with many leading contributors called A Stag Party with Men Only, printed by Newnes in that same year.

Travel was one of his great interests: he went to Tibet on horseback across the Himalayas and flew across India in a plane that arrived in a packing case. He also visited Japan, China, Hong Kong, Vietnam, Cambodia, Thailand, Malaya, East Africa, Morocco, Egypt, the Middle East, Russia, South America, Turkey and most of the countries in Europe.

Minney wrote a number of books. His first non-fiction book, Shiva, or The Future of India was published in 1929 and banned; and Earl Winterton, Under-Secretary of State for India said it was debarred entry because it was offensive to the people of India. Minney's first big best seller was his 1931 biography Clive of India. He also wrote Carve Her Name with Pride (1956) about the brave secret agent Violette Szabo, who was posthumously awarded the George Cross, and which was later turned into a successful film starring Virginia McKenna. Another of his non-fiction works was I Shall Fear No Evil, a harrowing but inspiring account of Dr Alina Brewda, who survived Auschwitz concentration camp and The Holocaust, which was published in 1966.

W. P. Lipscomb was co-author of Clive of India in 1933, which was first produced for the stage by the village players of Great Hucklow in Derbyshire. It ran for over a year in London, and was made into a film by 20th Century Fox. Minney was hired to write the screenplay for this 1935 adaptation by producer Darryl F. Zanuck; however, he did not settle in Hollywood, and returned to Britain. With Sir Osbert Sitwell, he wrote Gentle Caesar, a biography of Tsar Nicholas II, which was first produced at the Alexandra Theatre in Birmingham in 1943, and Red Horizon. With Juliet Rhys-Williams, They Had His Number was first produced at the Hippodrome in Bolton in 1942, and Minney's own play, The Voice of the People, was first produced in Southend in 1950.

From 1942, he became a leading figure in the Gainsborough Pictures production team, and with producer Ted Edward Black, they produced a series of costume melodramas, which dominated the market from 1942 to 1946. He produced films including The Wicked Lady (1945), which showed that British films could compete with Hollywood, Madonna of the Seven Moons, The Magic Bow and Osbert Sitwell's A Place of One's Own, with settings designed by Rex Whistler. He also produced a film of Terence Rattigan's The Final Test. These films helped boost the careers of new stars including Stewart Granger, James Mason, Patricia Roc and Margaret Lockwood. However, he resigned from the Rank Organisation on 23 January 1947, unhappy with the direction of the company. He was Hon. President of the London School of Economics Film Society (1948–49), a member of the Executive and General Council at the Association of Cine Technicians (1953–1956), Vice Chairman of ACT Films Ltd (1951–1968) and chairman of the same company from 1968.

Minney was also politically active, and was twice a candidate for the Labour Party at UK general elections. His first attempt was for the newly created Southend East in 1950, when he came a close second to the Conservative candidate. In 1955, he stood for Bexley, which was won by the Conservative incumbent, future party leader and Prime Minister Edward Heath with 28,610 votes (54.27%), whilst Minney, for Labour, won 24,111 votes (45.73%).

In July 1956, Minney went to Peking to speak at the centenary celebrations for George Bernard Shaw. This was covered in his book Next Stop--Peking: Record of a 16,000 Mile Journey Through Russia, Siberia, and China. The Times reviewer (28 November 1957) wrote, "Mr Minney does not pretend to know. He was invited to China to take part in the Shaw centenary celebrations and stayed to do the regular tour and be impressed. This is another delegate's view among the many we have lately had from China – easily readable, superficial."

== Personal life ==
Minney married Edith Anne Murielle Fox in 1918. In 1933, he was living at "Little Walcott", on Bishops Avenue in Hampstead Garden Suburb, London; they later they lived at Lawford House, Manningtree in Essex. They had two children, Primrose and Robin Paul. The first marriage was dissolved and he married Hetty (née Bolsom), becoming stepfather of Penelope Janet Chisholm. They lived in Hook House, Cousley Wood, Wadhurst, Sussex, and Bewl Water reservoir came close to the house when it was filled in 1975.

He was a member of the Savage Club.

== Death ==
He died in Ticehurst, Sussex on 5 January 1979, aged 83. A memorial service was held at St James's, Piccadilly on 5 April 1979; former Labour Prime Minister Sir Harold Wilson MP read the lesson, whilst actress Virginia McKenna read a poem from her film Carve Her Name with Pride. The address was given by Dulcie Gray, and Muriel Pavlow said the prayer of St Francis.

== Filmography ==
- Clive of India (1935)
- Dear Octopus (1943)
- Madonna of the Seven Moons (1944)
- A Place of One's Own (1944)
- Love Story (1944)
- They Were Sisters (1945)
- The Wicked Lady (1945)
- Caravan (1946)
- The Magic Bow (1947)
- The Idol of Paris (1948)
- Time Gentlemen Please! (1952)
- The Final Test (1953)
- Carve Her Name with Pride (1958)

== Bibliography ==
=== Novels ===
- Maki (1921)
- The Road to Delhi (1923)
- Distant Drums (1935)
- How Vainly Men (1940)
- A Woman of France (1945)
- Nothing to Lose (1946) (filmed as Time Gentlemen, Please!, 1952)
- Bring Out the Drum (1950)
- The Governor's Wife (1951)
- Anne of the Sealed Knot (1972)

=== Biographies ===
- Clive of India (1931, also 1957)
- Governor General (1935) a love story about Warren Hastings
- Gentle Caesar, Tsar Nicholas II
- Charlie Chaplin – The Immortal Tramp 1954
- Viscount Southwood (1954)
- Carve Her Name with Pride (1956)
- Viscount Addison (Leader of the Lords) (1958)
- Fanny and the Regent of Siam (1962)
- I Shall Fear No Evil (1966)
- Rasputin (1972/3)
- Puffin Asquith (1973) (about Anthony Asquith)
- Lola Montez (1976)

=== Other non-fiction ===
- Shiva, or the Future of India (1929)
- India Marches Past (1933)
- Hollywood by Starlight (1935)
- Midst Himalayan Mists
- Excursions in Ink
- Across India by Air
- The Journalist
- Night Life of Calcutta
- Talking of Films (1947)
- A Stag Party with Men Only (1955)
- Next Stop Peking (1957)
- The Private Papers of Hore Belisha (1960)
- No 10 Downing Street, a House in History (1963)
- The Film Maker and His World (1964)
- The Edwardian Age (1964)
- The Two Pillars of Charing Cross (1967)
- Recollections of George Bernard Shaw (1969)
- The Tower of London (1970)
- Hampton Court (1972)

=== Plays ===
- Clive of India (1933)
- Gentle Caesar (1942)
- They Had His Number (1942)
- The Red Horizon (1943)
- The Voice of the People (1950)
