= The Wicked Lady =

1945 British film

- Promotional poster
- Directed by: Leslie Arliss
- Written by: Leslie Arliss additional dialogue Gordon Glennon; Aimee Stuart
- Based on: novel Life and Death of the Wicked Lady Skelton by Magdalen King-Hall
- Produced by: R. J. Minney executive Maurice Ostrer
- Starring: James Mason; Margaret Lockwood; Patricia Roc; Griffith Jones; Jean Kent; Michael Rennie; Felix Aylmer; Enid Stamp Taylor
- Cinematography: Jack E. Cox
- Edited by: Terence Fisher
- Music by: Hans May
- Production company: Gainsborough Pictures
- Distributed by: Eagle-Lion Distributors Limited (U.K.); Universal (U.S.)
- Release date: 15 November 1945
- Running time: 104 minutes
- Country: United Kingdom
- Language: English
- Budget: £900,000 or $672,000
- Box office: over $1 million (US rentals) £375,000 (UK rentals) or $2,250,000 (UK gross)

The Wicked Lady is a 1945 British costume drama film directed by Leslie Arliss and starring Margaret Lockwood in the title role as a nobleman's wife who becomes a highwaywoman for the excitement. It had one of the largest audiences for a film of its period, with an estimated British attendance of 18.4 million seeing it in cinemas, according to a 2004 ranking of the most popular sound films in Britain. In the list, compiled by the British Film Institute for Channel 4, it was placed ninth overall, and was the second-most successful British film, behind only Spring in Park Lane (1948).

It was one of the Gainsborough melodramas, a sequence of very popular films made during the 1940s.

The story was based on the 1945 novel Life and Death of the Wicked Lady Skelton by Magdalen King-Hall which, in turn, was based upon the (disputed) events surrounding the life of Lady Katherine Ferrers, the wife of the major landowner in Markyate on the main London–Birmingham road.

A remake, also named The Wicked Lady, was made by Michael Winner in 1983.

== Plot ==
In rural England in the late 17th century, Caroline invites her beautiful friend Barbara to attend her marriage to wealthy landowner and local magistrate Sir Ralph Skelton. However, the scheming Barbara soon has Skelton entranced, and it is Barbara who becomes Lady Skelton, as Caroline looks on. At the wedding reception, however, Barbara meets a handsome stranger, Kit Locksby. It is love at first sight for both, but it is too late.

Married life in the country becomes a bore for Lady Skelton—that is, until a visit from her detested sister-in-law Henrietta. In a game of Ombre, Henrietta wins Barbara's prized jewels, including her late mother's ruby brooch. A chance remark about a notorious highwayman, Jerry Jackson, gives Barbara an idea. Masquerading as Jackson, Barbara stops Henrietta's coach and retrieves her brooch and the rest of her jewels. Intoxicated by the experience, she continues to waylay coaches until one night, she and the real Jerry Jackson finally meet. Jackson is amused to find his imitator a beautiful woman. They become lovers and partners in crime, with Barbara warning Jackson never to be unfaithful to her with another woman.

Together, they profit off of unfortunate travellers. However, their plot to rob a huge gold shipment goes awry, resulting in Barbara shooting and killing one of Sir Ralph Skelton's tenants. One of Skelton's servants discovers Barbara's involvement, but she manages to convince him that Jackson forced her to be his accomplice. She also manipulates the servant's religious piety, telling him that she wants to live an honest, clean life and is relying on him to show her the way.

Pretending to be newly devout and honest, Barbara secretly poisons the servant. When he falls gravely ill and realizes what she's been doing, Barbara smothers him with a pillow. Ecstatic at being free again, she rushes to the inn where she and Jackson often stayed, but finds him in bed with another woman. Enraged, Barbara anonymously betrays his whereabouts to her husband. Jackson is captured and sentenced to be hanged.

In London, Barbara attends the execution with Caroline, who refuses to watch. In his speech from the scaffold, Jackson talks only of faithless women but does not refer specifically to Barbara. At his request (conveyed in a note by a priest on site), Barbara tries to give Jackson's other woman some money, but the woman attacks Barbara's carriage in a rage and a riot breaks out.

The two ladies are rescued by Kit Locksby, who has recently become engaged to Caroline. After the hanging, Jackson's accomplices cut him down and revive him. He later breaks into Barbara's bedroom at the estate and rapes her. Fearing his next move, she begs Kit to run away with her. However, he will not betray Caroline.

Late one evening, Ralph is due to return home in his coach after driving Caroline and Kit back to London. Barbara, in highwayman's gear, awaits her husband's coach with a loaded pistol. Jackson shows up and realises Barbara's scheme. He plans to warn Skelton, but Barbara shoots him; just before he dies he says they'll meet again in hell. When the coach comes, Barbara, still in disguise, hijacks it and attempts to shoot her husband, not knowing that Caroline and Kit have returned with him, the three having agreed to find a way for both couples to be together. As she aims the gun at Ralph, Kit emerges from the coach and fires first. She is wounded, but rides off, and Caroline stops Kit from firing again. Back at the estate, a mortally wounded Barbara confesses all to Kit, including her murders, and pleads that he stay with her until the end, but he is horrified at what she has done and leaves. After her death, Caroline and Skelton reunite, determined to put the past behind them.

== Cast ==
- Margaret Lockwood as Barbara Worth
- James Mason as Captain Jerry Jackson
- Patricia Roc as Caroline
- Griffith Jones as Sir Ralph Skelton
- Michael Rennie as Kit Locksby
- Felix Aylmer as Hogarth
- Enid Stamp Taylor as Lady Kingsclere
- Francis Lister as Lord Kingsclere
- Beatrice Varley as Aunt Moll
- Amy Dalby as Aunt Doll
- Martita Hunt as Cousin Agatha
- David Horne as Martin Worth
- Emrys Jones as Ned Cotterill
- Helen Goss as Mistress Betsy
- Muriel Aked as Mrs. Munce
- Jean Kent as Jackson's doxy

== Production ==
The source novel for the film, Magdalen King-Hall's Life and Death of the Wicked Lady Skelton, was published in 1944. Mason and Lockwood's involvement in the movie adaptation was announced in November of that year, together with that of director Leslie Arliss.

In a 1945 issue of Picturegoer, Arliss indicated that it was Eleanor Smith (author of the book which had inspired his 1943 hit The Man in Grey) who gave him King-Hall's novel, continuing:

I told Maurice Ostrer of Gainsborough Pictures that I had found my ideal film subject and found that he had already purchased the rights himself! The character of Barbara is wicked enough even for me, and how vastly interesting is this most complex character as it develops through the action of the story.

Lockwood later wrote in her memoirs, "This was an enchantingly 'wicked' part. At first, as usual, I did not like the thought of playing a villainous role again, but it was such a good one that I knew it would be madness to refuse it."

Stewart Granger, who'd played the romantic lead in The Man in Grey, turned down the role that Mason played. Lockwood practiced riding for the role and added a black beauty spot.

Caroline, the character played by Roc, is a movie script addition, not existing in the novel.

=== Shooting ===
Filming started March 1945. The film was made at Gainsborough Studios in London, with location shooting at Blickling Hall in Norfolk.

Lockwood wrote "we enjoyed making that film together. We did not enjoy remaking it, exactly one year later", when they had to re shoot scenes for American censors.

== British reception ==
=== Release ===
Queen Mary wished to attend the film's premiere, which caused some concern in light of the film's subject matter; reportedly, the operator in the projection box turned down the sound during key exchanges of dialogue. However, Queen Mary told J. Arthur Rank that she enjoyed the film, and felt it had "a fine moral". Rank later said:

Queen Mary is the only person to see in the film what I see myself. I only agreed to it because there’s a moral in it. You have two pretty girls, Margaret Lockwood and Pat Roc. One of them falls to temptation, and gets shot in the end; the other lives happily. That’s the moral. Both girls are pretty, you see; it wouldn’t have meant anything if one of them had been plain.

=== Box office ===
The Wicked Lady was the most popular film at the British box office in 1946. According to Kinematograph Weekly, the "biggest winner" at the box office in 1946 Britain was The Wicked Lady, with "runners up" being The Bells of St. Mary's, Piccadilly Incident, Road to Utopia, Tomorrow is Forever, Brief Encounter, Wonder Man, Anchors Aweigh, Kitty, The Captive Heart, The Corn is Green, The Spanish Main, Leave Her to Heaven, Gilda, Caravan, Mildred Pierce, The Blue Dahlia, The Years Between, O.S.S., Spellbound, Courage of Lassie, My Reputation, London Town, Caesar and Cleopatra, Meet the Navy, Men of Two Worlds, Theirs is the Glory, The Overlanders, and Bedelia.

In a 2004 British Film Institute list of the most popular sound films in British cinemas, The Wicked Lady was ninth overall, with an estimated attendance of 18.4 million. It was second only to Spring in Park Lane among British films, in a ranking broadcast by Channel 4.

In Latin America, The Wicked Lady earned $160,475 in box office takings.

== US release ==
Problems with American censors made extensive re-shooting necessary before the film was released in the United States (according to Robert Osborne of Turner Classic Movies).

The problems were that the women's dress bodices (appropriate for the era portrayed) were very low-cut and showed too much cleavage for the USA motion picture production code. It was a problem Jane Russell had in The Outlaw (1943). TCM sometimes airs the original, uncensored version on its USA basic cable network.

Margaret Lockwood said "We had to do nine days of retakes to satisfy the censor on that film and it all seemed very foolish."

Mason said "I don't like it now", referring to the film after the changes.

== Proposed sequel ==
Executive producer Maurice Ostrer reportedly wanted to make a sequel, but this was vetoed by J. Arthur Rank, who had taken over ownership of Gainsborough Studios. In 1950, it was announced that Arliss had written a sequel, The Wicked Lady's Daughter, but the film was never made.
