= The Tenant of Wildfell Hall (disambiguation) =

The Tenant of Wildfell Hall is an 1848 novel by Anne Brontë.

The Tenant of Wildfell Hall may also refer to:

- The Tenant of Wildfell Hall (1968 TV series), starring Janet Munro, Corin Redgrave and Bryan Marshall
- The Tenant of Wildfell Hall (1996 TV series), starring Tara Fitzgerald, Rupert Graves, James Purefoy and Toby Stephens
