= Llandudno Pier Pavilion Theatre =

Theatre in Llandudno, Wales (1886–1994)

Coordinates: 53°19′40.8″N 3°49′47″W

- Llandudno Pier Pavilion Theatre - Exterior in context
- Location: Llandudno
- Area: North Wales
- Built: 1886
- Demolished: 1994

Detailed view of the Theatre's exterior

Llandudno Pier Pavilion Theatre - Interior

Llandudno Pier Pavilion Theatre was a Victorian seaside theatre in the holiday resort of Llandudno in North Wales, UK.

== Construction ==
The Directors of the Llandudno Pier Company had successfully opened the new pier in 1878 and were now looking to expand their business to take advantage of Llandudno's growing popularity as a seaside resort. The existing sundeck pavilion at the end of the pier was proving inadequate to cope with the demand for musical recitals, so the decision was taken to build a bigger and better pavilion near the promenade entrance to the pier extension then under construction.

Work started in 1881 and the plans called for a 2,000-seat three-storey structure, to be built in the typically flamboyant Victorian style, complete with a superbly detailed cast-iron veranda, running the length of the entire seaward side of the building. The pavilion was unusual in that it had two main entrances, the first from the pier entering at Stall level and the other on Happy Valley Road, which emerged onto the Balcony. More unusually, the pavilion basement housed what was then the largest indoor swimming pool in Britain. Unfortunately for the pier company, problems with water quality meant that this novel idea did not prove successful, and the pool was filled in shortly afterwards.

The pavilion was scheduled to open in the Spring of 1883, but a ferocious storm on the night of 25 January 1883 resulted in severe damage to the glass roof. Following a rethink of the roof's design (and much embarrassment to the building's architects, who were promptly dismissed by the pier company), the decision was taken to replace the original glass roof with a sturdy lead one, more suited to the demands of a North Wales location in winter. Extensive rebuilding work was required, and the building did not open officially until September 1886. The pavilion was 204 ft long (62 m), with a width ranging from 84 ft (26 m) to 104 ft (32 m). The canopy roof was 60 ft across (18 m). One end of the building housed the Egyptian Hall, which featured hieroglyphics on its wall decorations.

== Orchestra (1886–1936) ==
Rivière's Orchestra at the Llandudno pier pavilion was a great success and was quickly trebled in size to symphony proportions. It contributed to the development of that great British summer entertainment, the promenade concert. The young Henry Wood came to Llandudno to observe the then elderly Rivière at work. Following Rivière, the locally renowned Arthur Payne held the baton for many years until 1925 when he was followed in 1926 by Malcolm Sargent for two notable seasons then by others from season to season including, as a guest conductor on several occasions, Sir Adrian Boult. The pier pavilion orchestra continued its summer seasons until 1936 when it gave way to variety shows, a victim of changing entertainment tastes. A small orchestra survived, this was taken over in 1938 by John Morava who maintained the pier's orchestral tradition to the very end in 1974, when the orchestra (by then confined to the pierhead pavilion) was finally disbanded.

== Variety Entertainment (1936–1984) ==
Thus, in 1936, the pavilion prepared to enter its second era - that of variety entertainment. This was to be the theatre's golden age, with the Pavilion firmly on the tour list of every major artist. Thousands of top acts appeared there over the years, including household names like George Formby, Ted Ray, Semprini, Petula Clark, Arthur Askey, Bryan Johnson, Bill Maynard ("Greengrass" in Heartbeat), Jimmy Edwards (Whacko!), Russ Conway, the Beverley Sisters, Cyril Fletcher and Cliff Richard. Special mention should be made of Welsh singer Ivor Emmanuel, who appeared regularly on Sunday night bills for many years. David Hughes also was a Sunday Night concert regular.

During its long history, the theatre has regularly hosted political rallies and conferences, with the vast auditorium resounding to the voices of David Lloyd George, Stanley Baldwin, Ramsay MacDonald, Oswald Mosley, Neville Chamberlain, Clement Attlee, Harold Macmillan, Edward Heath and Winston Churchill. It is reputed that, during the Conservative Party's conference at the pavilion in 1948, a young lady decided to abandon her previous career plans and enter politics. Her name was Margaret Thatcher.

In the decades following the war, the pavilion was as popular as ever with the thousands of holidaymakers returning to Llandudno year after year. It was not until the end of the 1960s that the popularity of the pavilion's variety shows began to flag - victims of the twin threats of television and cheap foreign holidays.

A full programme of summer shows was carried on through the 1970s but the audiences were falling away steadily and the length of the summer season began to shorten. By now, the theatre was under the creative control of local impresario and comedian Alex Munro, who introduced new initiatives to bring back the audiences, including the pavilion's first pantomime in 1972, an event which was marred by the sad death of Munro's daughter Janet Munro, who died in tragic circumstances days before she was due to begin rehearsals for the show.

== Closure and subsequent uses (1984–1990) ==
On 6 December 1983, the Llandudno Pier Company sold the pavilion for £10,000 to Llandudno Pavilion Ltd, a sister company of Uttoxeter Investments Ltd, a leisure company that already operated the Llandudno Cabin Lift. Despite the high quality of the Summer shows, the audiences were still falling and in 1984, it was decided that the theatre would close at the end of the summer season. The final show at the pavilion was Startime Follies, a variety show featuring Tommy Trafford, Lynda Lee Lewis, Kay Carman and the Marie Ashton Dancers, with performances at 8pm nightly and a high season only matinee at 3pm daily. Ticket prices ranged from £2 to £2.60. The lack of audiences, increasing costs of maintaining the old building and new fire regulations had finally put paid to the pavilion's theatrical tradition—98 years after it had first opened.

The pavilion's days as an entertainment venue were not entirely over, however. A few months before the theatre closed, a new attraction opened in the basement. The huge basement area (originally built as the country's largest indoor swimming pool back in 1886 but which closed shortly afterwards due to problems with water quality) had been home over the years to a small amusement arcade called Tusons and, later, a ghost train ride and vintage car 'round the world' ride. These were all cleared out to make way for the Llandudno Dungeon, a walk through horror waxworks exhibition, featuring scenes from the more gruesome aspects of human history, all built at a cost of over £100,000. Scenes depicted included a full size replica of a Victorian London street, complete with Sweeney Todd's barber shop and opium den, the 1665 Great Plague of London, body snatchers at work and a full size model of a guillotine. This novel attraction proved successful for a few years but closed at the end of 1990, when the entire exhibition was sold and shipped to France. For the first time in over a hundred years, the entire pavilion stood empty and unused.

== Destruction and aftermath (1994–present) ==
Lack of maintenance meant that the exterior of the building deteriorated rapidly but the interior remained in surprisingly good condition, with most of the original architectural and theatre features still in situ. January 1992 saw ownership of the building pass to the London-based Launchsign Ltd, which announced their intention to completely restore the building and introduce a Covent Garden-style indoor market to the former theatre area. Despite the grandiose plans, no effort was made to repair or even secure the theatre building, which became increasingly vandalised and a meeting place for local youths. The process of decay accelerated, until the almost inevitable arson attack in 1994 destroyed the main theatre building. The site has never been cleared properly and remains an eyesore until the present day. Attempts by Conwy County Council to redevelop the site have been constantly rebuffed by the current owner, a Worcester businessman called David Taylor.

In 2011, the owner's agent and architects put forward plans for a modern, glass fronted, 110 bedroom hotel on the site. The design and scale of the proposed building was rejected by both local and national authorities but the owner has proved reluctant to submit a revised, more sympathetic design. The stalemate continued for several more years until a surprise announcement in April 2016 by local property developer, Alan Waldron, stated that he had secured the site and planned a new Pavilion building, incorporating underground car parking, commercial space and residential apartments.

In 2021 the Tir Prince Leisure Group, the owners of the pier, announced they had purchased the derelict site with intent to develop it.

== Sources ==
- Ivor Wynne Jones. Llandudno Queen of Welsh Resorts Landmark, Ashbourne Derbyshire 2002 ISBN 1-84306-048-5 .
