= Time Remembered (film) =

- Hallmark Hall of Fame episode
- Directed by: George Schaefer
- Based on: play by Jean Anouilh
- Original air date: 1961

Time Remembered is a 1961 American television film for the Hallmark Hall of Fame. It was based on the play by Jean Anouilh and directed by George Schaefer.

== Cast ==
- Christopher Plummer as Prince Albert
- Edith Evans as Duchess
- Janet Munro as Amanda
- Barry Jones as Lord Hector
- Paul Hartman as Landlord
- Sig Arno as Ferdinand
- Sybil Bowan as Madame Rensada

== Production ==
The play had been performed on Broadway in 1957-58 starring Helen Hayes. It was Edith Evans' American debut and Janet Munro's second performance for American television.

== Reception ==
The Los Angeles Times thought Munro carried "off the acting honours". Variety said it was done with "flawless taste".
