= Alex Munro (comedian) =

Scottish actor and comedian

Alex Munro (6 March 1911 – 20 January 1986) was a Scottish actor and comedian.

== Career ==
Born as Alexander Neilson Horsburgh in Shettleston, Glasgow, he joined his brother Archie and sister June in an acrobatic act called The Star Trio. They later changed their name to The Horsburgh Brothers and Agnes and became part of Florrie Forde's music hall company with Flanagan and Allen.

During World War Two, Munro toured with the RAF show, Contact, and had his own BBC radio series The Size of It. He headlined in a number of British variety theatres, before finally making his home in Llandudno, Wales. He was given creative control of the Llandudno Pier Pavilion Theatre in the 1970s. The Alex Munro Show ran at the Happy Valley in Llandudno for 30 years.

== Personal life ==
Munro and his first wife, Phyllis (née Robertshaw), were the parents of actress Janet Munro (1934–1972), who predeceased her father. Alex Munro had two grandchildren by his daughter. He died in Llandudno in 1986, aged 74.

== Memorial ==
In honour of Alex Munro's contribution to the town of Llandudno, a short stretch of road leading up to the former site of his Open Air Theatre in Happy Valley was renamed 'Alex Munro Way' in March 2014.

== Filmography ==
- Holiday on the Buses (1973)
- Mr. Rose (1 episode, 1968)
- Z-Cars (1 episode, 1963)
