= Small Hotel =

1957 British film by David MacDonald

- Directed by: David MacDonald
- Written by: Wilfred Eades
- Based on: the play Small Hotel by Rex Frost
- Produced by: Robert Hall
- Starring: Gordon Harker; Marie Lohr; Janet Munro
- Cinematography: Norman Warwick
- Edited by: Seymour Logie
- Music by: Louis Levy
- Production company: A Welwyn Films Ltd. Production
- Distributed by: Associated British-Pathé (UK)
- Release date: October 1957 (UK)
- Running time: 58 min
- Country: United Kingdom
- Language: English

Small Hotel is a 1957 British 'B' comedy film directed by David MacDonald and starring Gordon Harker, Marie Lohr, John Loder, and Janet Munro. It was written by Wilfred Eades based on the 1955 play of the same name by Rex Frost.

== Plot ==
Albert, a crafty old waiter in a country hotel known as The Jolly Fiddler, teaches the younger staff how to maximise their tips and get rid of surplus food in the kitchen.

He suddenly finds he must work new tricks on management after being told he is too old for the job and will be replaced by a hard-nosed young waitress, named Miss Mallet.

== Cast ==
- Gordon Harker as Albert
- Marie Lohr as Mrs Samson-Fox
- John Loder as Mr. Finch
- Irene Handl as Mrs Gammon
- Janet Munro as Effie Rigler
- Billie Whitelaw as Caroline Mallet
- Ruth Trouncer as Sheila
- Francis Matthews as Alan Pryor
- Frederick Schiller as foreigner [speaking in German and then in English]
- Derek Blomfield as Roland
- Dorothy Bromiley as Rosemary

== Production ==
Gordon Harker starred in Rex Frost's play originally called The Jolly Fiddler which debuted in Liverpool 1954. Frost had once been a waiter and he and his wife had managed a small hotel. Variety called it "a pleasant vehicle for the thesping talents of Gordon Harker."

The play was produced again in 1955 under the title Small Hotel, eventually travelling to London in October where it ran until January and then had a long life in amateur companies. The Guardian called it "a gentle, pensive comedy". Variety, reviewing it again, called it "modest, but amusing." Peggy Ramsay, who was the agent for the play, attributed most of its success to Gordon Harker.

The film was shot at Elstree Studios. Janet Munro says she took the role because she was bored in her marriage to Tony Wright and that her performance led to her casting in The Young and the Guilty.

== Critical reception ==
TV Guide gave the film two out of five stars and called it an "Average comedy." Filmink said Munro was "very sweet".

In the Radio Times, David McGillivray rated the film two out of five stars, calling it "no great shakes as comedy, but interesting as a vehicle built around a much-loved British star at the end of his career."

Britmovie noted, "Twenty years after appearing on stage in this lively Rex Frost play, in his penultimate film Gordon Harker reprises the role of a belligerent hotel waiter having to use all his wit and cunning to save his job. This low-budget film features Harker in typically jovial form, dominating comic proceedings with typical polished expertise, and with a less assured cast this thin comedy wouldn’t be worthwhile. There are early roles for Billie Whitelaw and Janet Munro, and the doughty Irene Handl is cast as the hotel’s spirited cook."

It was one of 15 films selected by Steve Chibnall and Brian McFarlane in The British 'B' Film, as among the most meritorious of the B films made in Britain between World War II and 1970. They especially praised the performances of Lohr, Handl and Harker.
