= The Tenant of Wildfell Hall =

1848 novel by Anne Brontë

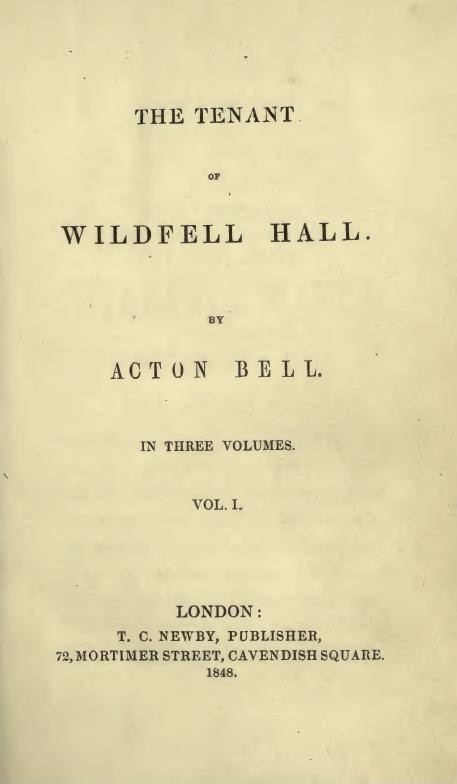
- Title page of the first edition, 1848
- Author: Anne Brontë (as "Acton Bell")
- Language: English
- Genre: Epistolary novel, social criticism
- Publisher: Thomas Cautley Newby
- Publication date: 24 June 1848
- Publication place: United Kingdom
- Media type: Print (Hardcover)
- Pages: 3 vols: 358, 366, 342
- OCLC: 162118830
- Dewey Decimal: 823.8
- LC Class: PR4162 .T4
- Preceded by: Agnes Grey
- Text: The Tenant of Wildfell Hall at Wikisource

The Tenant of Wildfell Hall is the second and final novel written by the English author Anne Brontë. It was first published in 1848 under the pseudonym Acton Bell. Probably the most shocking of the Brontës' novels, it was an instant success, but after Anne's death, her sister Charlotte prevented its re-publication in England until 1854.

The novel is framed as letters from Gilbert Markham to a friend. In them he describes meeting a mysterious young widow, Helen Graham, who arrives with her young son and a servant to Wildfell Hall, an Elizabethan mansion which has been empty for many years. Contrary to early 19th-century norms, she pursues an artist's career and makes an income by selling her pictures. Her strict seclusion soon gives rise to gossip in the neighbouring village and she becomes a social outcast. Gilbert comes to understand that she has fled with her son from an abusive relationship, to save him from his father's influence. The novel is notable for its depiction of marital strife and women's professional work. It also expresses Anne Brontë's belief in universal salvation.

Most critics now consider The Tenant of Wildfell Hall to be one of the first feminist novels. In leaving her husband and taking their child, Helen violates not only social conventions but also early 19th-century English law.

== Background ==
Some aspects of the life and character of the author's brother Branwell Brontë correspond to those of Helen's husband Arthur Huntingdon in The Tenant. He resembles Branwell Brontë in three ways: physical good looks; sexual adventures (before his affair with his employer's wife, Mrs Robinson, Branwell is believed by some to have fathered an illegitimate child who died at birth) and especially in his alcoholism. Another character in the novel, Lord Lowborough, has an association with opium that may also reflect Branwell's behaviour.

Another possible source is the story of Mrs Collins, the wife of a local curate, who in November 1840 came to Anne's father Patrick Brontë seeking advice regarding her alcoholic husband's abusive conduct, and was advised by him to leave her husband. Mrs Collins returned to Haworth in the spring of 1847, while Anne was writing The Tenant, and told how she had managed to build a new life for herself and her two children.

== Locations ==
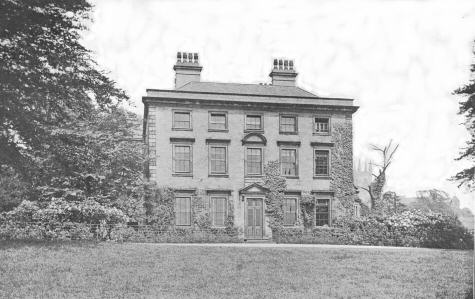
Blake Hall photographed at the end of the 19th century

The Brontë biographer Winifred Gérin believed that the original of Wildfell Hall was Ponden Hall, a farmhouse near Stanbury in West Yorkshire. Ponden shares certain architectural details with Wildfell, including latticed windows and a central portico with a date plaque above.

Blake Hall at Mirfield, where Anne had been employed as a governess, was suggested as the model for Grassdale Manor, Arthur Huntingdon's country seat, by Ellen Nussey, a friend of Charlotte Brontë, to Edward Morison Wimperis, an artist commissioned to illustrate the Brontë sisters' novels in 1872. However, neither Blake Hall nor Thorpe Green, another house where Anne was employed as a governess, corresponds exactly with Grassdale.

Linden-Car, the village that Wildfell Hall stands close to, is in Yorkshire. Car in northern dialect means pool, pond or low-lying and boggy ground. Also mentioned is Lindenhope, where hope in Northeastern English means a small enclosed valley.

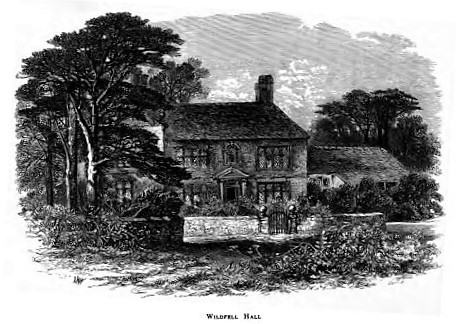
Wildfell Hall, as depicted by Edmund Morison Wimperis

== Plot summary ==
The novel is divided into three volumes.

Part One (Chapters 1 to 15) is narrated by farmer Gilbert Markham as a letter to his friend Jack Halford, beginning with an account of how a mysterious widow, Mrs Helen Graham, arrives at Wildfell Hall, a nearby mansion. A source of curiosity for the small community, the reticent Mrs Graham and her young son, Arthur, are slowly drawn into the social circles of the village. Initially, Gilbert casually courts vicar's daughter Eliza Millward, despite his mother's belief that he can do better. His interest in Eliza wanes as he comes to know Mrs Graham. In retribution, Eliza spreads (and perhaps creates) scandalous rumours about Mrs Graham. With gossip flying, Gilbert is led to believe that his friend Frederick Lawrence is courting Mrs Graham. At a chance meeting on a road, Gilbert strikes the mounted Mr Lawrence with a whip handle, causing him to fall from his horse. Though she is unaware of this confrontation, Mrs Graham still refuses to marry Gilbert, but when he accuses her of loving Mr Lawrence, she gives him her diaries.

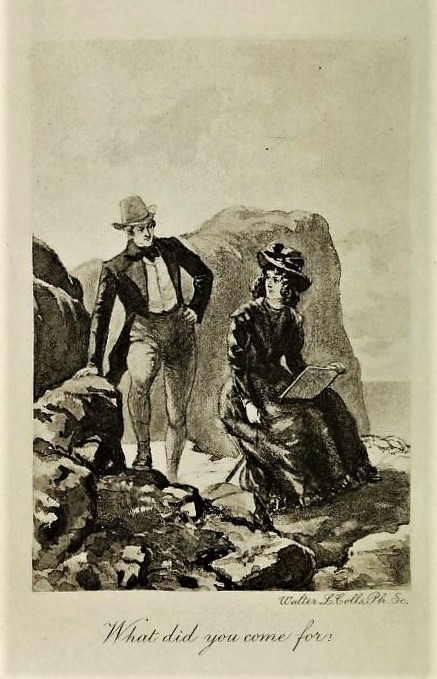
Helen and Gilbert by Walter L. Colls

Part two (Chapters 16 to 44) is taken from Helen's diaries, in which she describes her marriage to Arthur Huntingdon. The handsome, witty Huntingdon is also spoilt, selfish and self-indulgent. Before marrying Helen, he flirts with Annabella Wilmot, and uses this to manipulate Helen and convince her to marry him. Helen, blinded by love, marries him, and resolves to reform him with gentle persuasion and good example. After the birth of their only child, also called Arthur, Huntingdon becomes increasingly jealous of their son and his claims on Helen's attentions and affections.

Huntingdon's pack of dissolute friends frequently engage in drunken revels at the family's home, Grassdale, oppressing those of finer character. Both men and women are portrayed as degraded. In particular, Annabella, now Lady Lowborough, is shown to be unfaithful to her melancholic but devoted husband.

Walter Hargrave, the brother of Helen's friend Milicent Hargrave, vies for Helen's affections. While he is not as wild as his peers, he is an unwelcome admirer and Helen senses his predatory nature. Mr Hargrave informs Helen of Huntingdon's affair with Lady Lowborough. When his friends depart, Huntingdon pines openly for his paramour and derides his wife, but he will not grant her a divorce.

Huntingdon's corruption of their son – encouraging him to drink and swear at his tender age – is the last straw for Helen. She plans to flee to save her son, but her husband learns of her plans from her diary and burns the artist's tools with which she had hoped to support herself. Eventually, with help from her brother, Mr Lawrence, and her servant, Rachel, Helen escapes and finds a secret refuge at Wildfell Hall.

Part Three (Chapters 45 to 53) continues Gilbert's letter to Mr Halford after reading of the diaries. Helen bids Gilbert to leave her because she is not free to marry. He complies and soon learns that she has returned to Grassdale because her husband is gravely ill. Helen's ministrations are in vain, and Huntingdon's death is painful since he is fraught with terror at what awaits him. Helen cannot comfort him, for he rejects responsibility for his actions and wishes instead for her to come with him to plead for his salvation.

A year passes. Gilbert pursues a rumour of Helen's impending wedding, only to find that Mr Lawrence, with whom he has reconciled, is marrying Helen's friend Esther Hargrave. Gilbert goes to Grassdale, and discovers that the wealth was Helen’s originally as Huntingdon was penniless. She lives at her estate in Staningley. He travels there, but is plagued by anxiety that she is now far above his station. By chance he encounters Helen, her aunt and young Arthur. The two reconcile and marry.

== Characters ==
=== Helen and her family ===
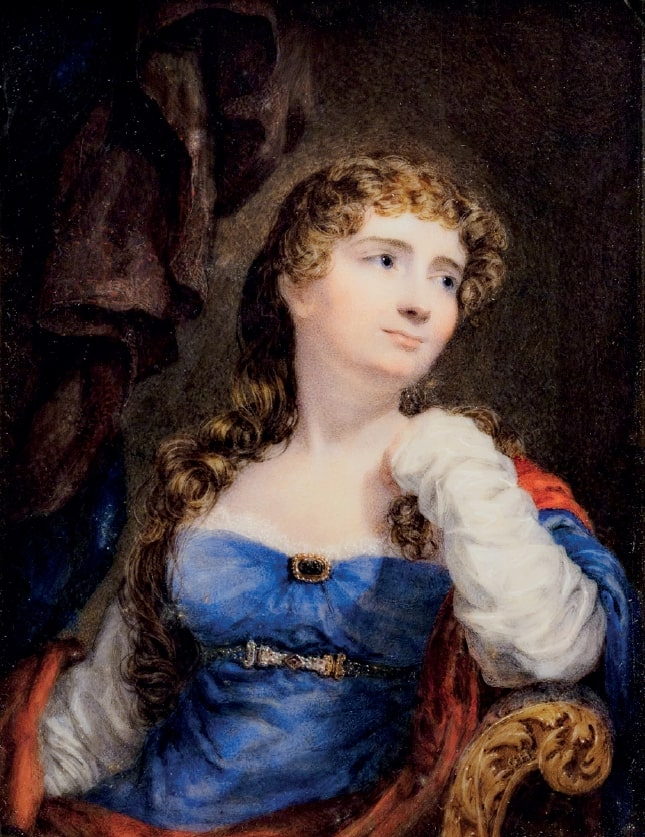
Annabella Milbanke, a possible real-life inspiration for Helen Graham

- Helen "Nell" Huntingdon (née Lawrence), known also under her alias Helen Graham (Graham is her mother's maiden name), the protagonist of the novel and the tenant of the title. Wildfell Hall is the place where she and her brother were born. After their mother's death she goes to live with their aunt and uncle at Staningley Manor, while her brother, Frederick, remains with their father. In spite of their separation, Helen has maintained an affectionate relationship with her brother and later he helps her to escape from her abusive and dissolute husband. The character of Helen Graham may have been inspired by Anna Isabella Milbanke, the wife of Lord Byron. Like Anna, Helen firstly believed that reforming her husband's behaviour was her religious obligation. Despite disillusionment, both women retained their Universalist faith.
- Master Arthur Huntingdon, five years old at the beginning of the book, the son of Arthur and Helen Huntingdon. He has a resemblance to his uncle, Frederick, which gives rise to gossip. He is grown up by the time of Gilbert's letter to Jack Halford, and is residing at Grassdale Manor with his wife, Helen Hattersley (the daughter of Milicent Hargrave and Ralph Hattersley).
- Mr Maxwell, Helen's wealthy uncle, dies near the end of the novel and leaves Staningley to Helen.
- Margaret "Peggy" Maxwell, Helen's aunt, tries to warn her against marrying Huntingdon. She dies several years after Helen's and Gilbert's marriage.
- Frederick Lawrence, Helen's brother, helps her to escape from Huntingdon and lends her money. As he and Helen grew up apart and only met in Staningley or Grassdale, no one in Linden-Car village guessed that the secretive Mrs Graham is actually Frederick's sister. Eventually he marries Esther Hargrave. Being in mourning for her husband, Helen is forced to miss her brother's wedding.

=== Huntingdon and his circle ===
- Arthur Huntingdon, Helen's abusive and alcoholic husband, is a Byronic figure of great fascination but also of barely concealed moral failings. His abusive behaviour impels Helen to run away from him, but nevertheless when he becomes ill (after the injury from falling from a horse when drunk), Helen returns to Grassdale to take care of him. Unwilling to stop drinking alcohol, Huntingdon deteriorates in health and eventually dies. He is widely thought to be loosely based on the author's brother, Branwell, but some critics have argued that they have very little in common. Along with Lord Lowborough, Huntingdon bears far stronger resemblance to two types of drunkards outlined in Robert Macnish's The Anatomy of Drunkenness.
- Annabella Wilmot, later Lady Lowborough, Arthur Huntingdon's paramour, is flirtatious, bold and exquisitely beautiful. She has an affair with Huntingdon for several years. Helen is forced to put up with the affair, but when Annabella's husband discovers it, he obtains a divorce. Gilbert says he hears that after Annabella moves to the continent, she falls into poverty and dies destitute and alone, but stresses he cannot be sure if this is true or merely a rumour.
- Lord Lowborough, a friend of Huntingdon's and Annabella's husband, is apathetic but devoted. Melancholic, dour and gloomy, he is in complete contrast to Huntingdon. He used to gamble and drink too much alcohol and developed an addiction to opium, but, after his financial ruin, gradually reforms himself. Lowborough truly loves Annabella, and her infidelity brings him such suffering that only his Christian faith and strong will keep him from suicide. Later he divorces her and after some time marries a plain middle-aged woman, who makes a good wife to him and a stepmother to his children with Annabella – a son and a daughter (who, it is implied, is Huntingdon's). Lord Lowborough also has some resemblances to Branwell, such as a life of debauchery, periods of remorse/religious torments, and opium, as well as moral weakness.
- Ralph Hattersley, a friend of Huntingdon's, marries Milicent Hargrave because he wants a quiet wife who will let him do what he likes with no word of reproach or complaint. He mistreats his wife. "I sometimes think she has no feeling at all; and then I go on until she cries – and that satisfies me," he tells Helen. But after he reforms himself he becomes a loving husband and father.
- Mr Grimsby, another of Arthur's friends, is a misogynist. He helps Arthur to conceal his affair with Annabella.

=== Inhabitants of Linden-Car Farm ===
- Gilbert Markham, a twenty-four-year-old farmer, is the principal narrator in the novel. He exhibits jealousy, moodiness and anger, but during the course of the novel he grows morally and proves to be worthy of Helen.
- Fergus Markham, Gilbert's seventeen-year-old brother, is high-spirited and idle, and often tries but fails to be witty.
- Rose Markham, a clever and pretty girl of 19, is Gilbert's younger sister and a friend of the Millward sisters. She becomes the wife of Jack Halford, to whom Gilbert is recounting in letters what happened 20 years prior in his youth.
- Mrs Markham, Gilbert's mother, is a great admirer of the Reverend Millward and his ideas.

=== Inhabitants of Ryecote Farm ===
- Jane Wilson, a friend of Eliza Millward and a scandalmonger, tries to ensnare Frederick Lawrence, but when Gilbert reveals to him her hatred of Frederick's sister Helen, Frederick breaks off their relationship. As no man she meets fits her high standards, she moves to a nearby country town, constantly name dropping, but friendless and, according to Helen, becomes a bitter spinster.
- Richard Wilson, Jane's brother, succeeds the Reverend Millward in the vicarage of Lindenhope and eventually marries his daughter, the plain Mary.
- Robert Wilson, brother to Jane and Richard, is a rough farmer whom Jane is ashamed of. However, everyone else approves of him as being pleasant and kind. He eventually marries, and Jane leaves the family home as she cannot stand him and his ordinary wife.
- Mrs Wilson, the mother of Jane, Richard and Robert, is a gossip like her daughter.

=== Inhabitants of the Vicarage ===
- Eliza Millward, daughter of the vicar and friend of Jane Wilson, is a scandalmonger. Gilbert carries on a half-serious flirtation with her before he first meets Helen.
- Mary Millward, Eliza's elder sister, is a plain, quiet, sensible girl, housekeeper and family drudge. She is trusted and valued by her father, loved and courted by children and poor people, dogs and cats, and slighted and neglected by everybody else.
- The Reverend Michael Millward, Eliza's and Mary's father, is a man of fixed principles, strong prejudices and regular habits. He considers anyone who disagrees with his views deplorably ignorant.

=== Inhabitants of The Grove ===
- Walter Hargrave, a friend of Arthur Huntingdon's, is a predatory admirer of Helen while she is still living with her husband. He is a cousin of Annabella Wilmot.
- Milicent Hargrave, a meek woman, married to Ralph Hattersley against her will, is Walter's sister and Helen's close friend. Milicent can be seen as a foil to her. While Helen is spirited and forthright, unafraid to speak to the men in her life with frankness, Milicent, in contrast, is trampled and ignored by her husband. Helen eventually leaves Huntingdon with her beloved son in tow, while Milicent says that she is "really contented" with her husband and "would not exchange [him] for any man on earth". At length, Ralph finally reforms himself and Milicent finds happiness in marriage.
- Esther Hargrave, the younger sister of Milicent and Walter, and Helen's friend, is bold, high-spirited and independent. She resists an arranged marriage her family tries to force her into and eventually marries Helen's brother, Frederick Lawrence.
- Mrs Hargrave, mother of the three Hargrave children, is a hard and stingy woman. She adores her only son and tries to marry off her daughters as soon as possible.

=== Other characters ===
- Mr Boarham, one of Helen's suitors before her marriage, is rejected because Helen is repelled by his dull conversation and age. Helen prefers to spell his name "Bore'em".
- Mr Wilmot, the uncle of Annabella Wilmot, is another of Helen's early suitors. She considers him a scoundrel.
- Rachel, a servant and friend of Helen and her son, has taken care of Helen since her birth.
- Alice Myers, another paramour of the elder Huntingdon, is hired ostensibly as a governess for little Arthur. Helen is suspicious of her from the start (all the families she has previously worked for have conveniently gone abroad), and when Rachel gives her certain proof that Alice is having an affair with her husband, she decides to flee.
- Benson, the butler at Grassdale Manor, has compassion for Helen in her misfortune and helps her escape.
- Jack Halford, a squire, is the husband of Rose Markham and the addressee of Gilbert's letters. He is an unseen character.

== Timeline ==
The novel begins in 1847, but flashes back to the period from 1821 to 1830 before returning.

- 1792/3 Arthur Huntingdon born.
- 1802/3 Helen Lawrence born at Wildfell Hall; Gilbert Markham born.
- 1821 The beginning of Helen's diary (1 June). She is back from her first season in London where she met Huntingdon. Wedding of Helen and Huntingdon (20 December).
- 1822 Helen reports the birth of her son, named also Arthur. (25 December).
- 1824 Helen reveals Huntingdon's affair with Annabella (7 October).
- 1827 Helen flees to Wildfell Hall with Rachel and little Arthur (24 October).
- 1828 Helen goes back to Grassdale to take care of Huntingdon (4 November); Huntingdon dies (5 December).
- 1830 Gilbert and Helen are married (August).
- 1847 Gilbert ends his letter to Jack Halford and the narrative (10 June).

== Themes ==
=== Alcoholism ===
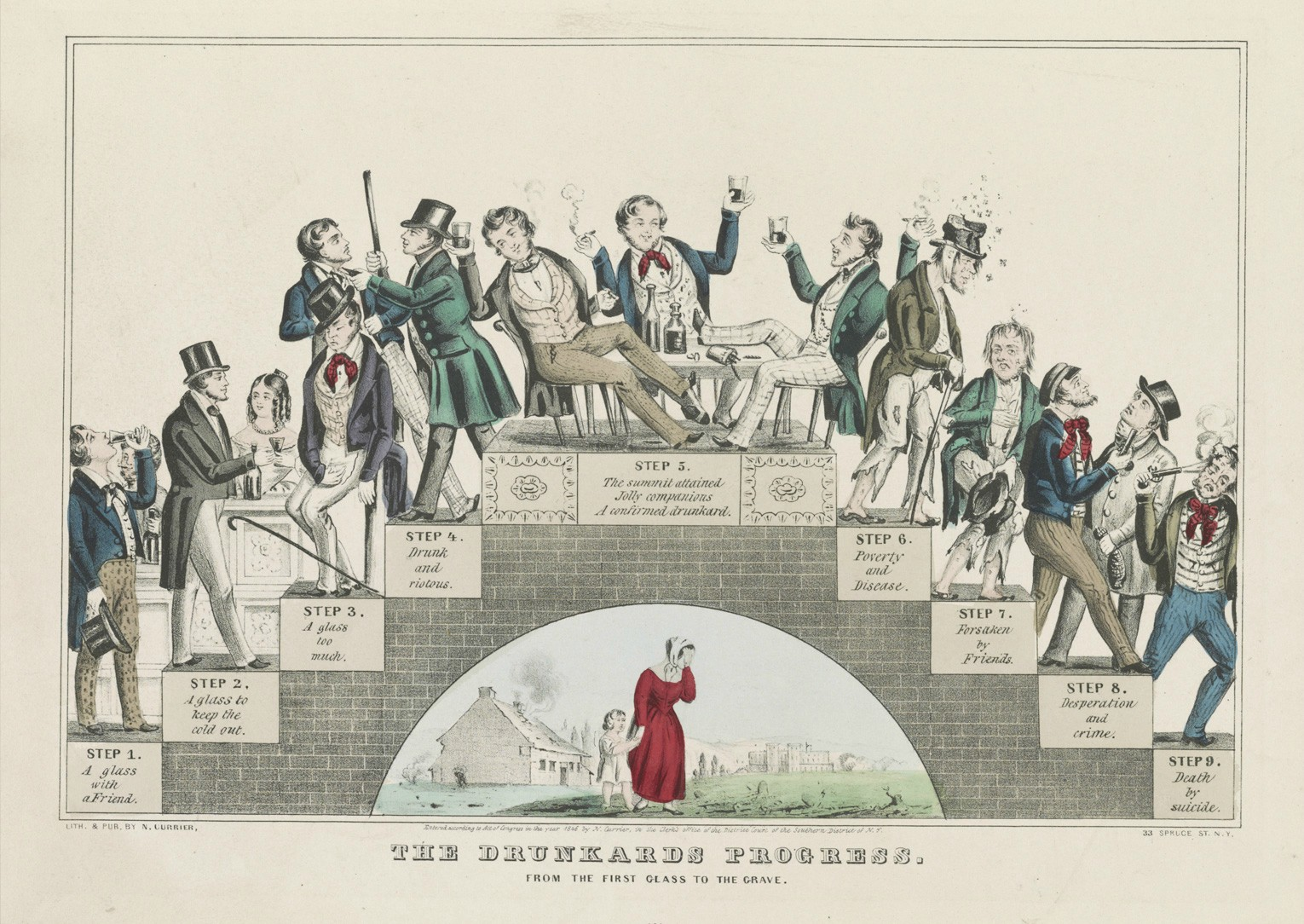
The Drunkard's Progress, lithograph by Nathaniel Currier supporting the temperance movement

Arthur Huntingdon and most of his male friends are heavy drinkers. Lord Lowborough is "the drunkard by necessity" – he tries to use alcohol as a way to cope with his personal problems. Arthur, like his friend Ralph Hattersley, is the "drunkard from an excess of indulgence in youth". Ultimately, only Ralph Hattersley and Lord Lowborough manage to reform their lives. Arthur and Lord Lowborough particularly seem affected by the traditional signs of alcoholism. They frequently drink themselves into incoherence and on awakening, they drink again to feel better. Lord Lowborough understands that he has a problem and, with willpower and strenuous effort, overcomes his addiction. Arthur continues drinking even after he injures himself falling from a horse, which eventually leads to his death. Ralph, although he drinks heavily with his friends, does not seem to be as much afflicted by alcoholism as by his way of life. Mr Grimsby continues his degradation, going from bad to worse and eventually dying in a brawl. Huntingdon's son Arthur becomes fond of alcohol through his father's efforts, but Helen begins to add to his wine a small quantity of tartar emetic, "just enough to produce inevitable nausea and depression without positive sickness." Very soon the boy begins to be made to feel ill by the very smell of alcohol.

=== Domestic violence ===
Marianne Thormählen calls Milicent's remark to her drunk and abusive husband Ralph, reminding him that they are not at home, "one of the most harrowing sentences in the entire novel". Thormählen argues that in The Tenant the traditional submissive behaviour of wives is shown as a factor that encourages male oppression. Later, when Ralph decides to reform his life, he blames his wife's meekness and says that resistance from her would have prevented his violence and debauchery.

=== Gender relations ===
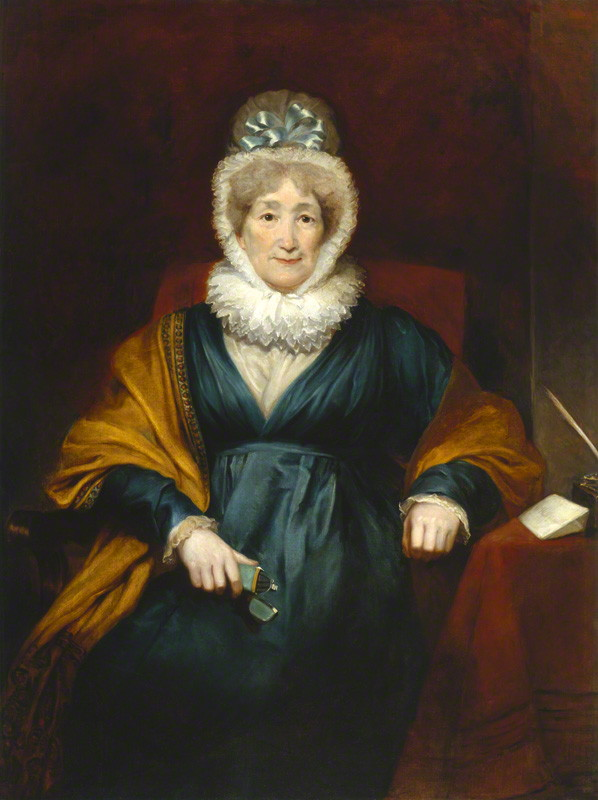
Hannah More's belief in the "moral superiority" of women had strongly influenced Victorian domestic ideology.

In discussing Brontë's narrative strategy, Carol N. Senf compares The Tenant with Margaret Atwood's Handmaid's Tale: in both novels female narrative is retold by a man. Brontë, like Atwood, "makes the reader wonder whether any two individuals could achieve the kind of equal relationship Gilbert seems to desire in a society that encourages inequality. Certainly, Helen's silence is in some ways as troubling to twentieth-century readers as Offred's, though Gilbert is much kinder and more thoughtful about his superior position than [Professor] Pieixoto."

According to Priti Joshi, in The Tenant Anne challenges the central tenet of 19th-century domestic ideology – women's influence on men – famously postulated by Hannah More. This doctrine found its way into even "protofeminist" novels such as Jane Eyre, where the main heroine fulfills (or reduces) her ambitions for a wider life by taming and managing her husband. In The Tenant, however, masculinity is impervious to the softening or "superior" influence of women. Marrying Arthur, Helen is convinced that she can reform him, but six years later she escapes from him to protect herself and her young son. Helen's second husband, Gilbert Markham, who despite many faults is "more pliable", never shows any noticeable reform throughout the novel. Joshi concludes that Gilbert is "tottering toward a new form of masculinity" together with Jack Halford, his close friend, by exchanging (Note: Note that Gilbert offers his story as a "coin", the "first instalment of [his] debt", that indicates emotional clumsiness even in his older self.) confidences and, by learning to communicate and reveal emotions, doing what is considered to be feminine, he can redeem himself, become a new man and a worthy husband of Helen.

Of all Arthur's friends, only Walter Hargrave has never been a heavy drinker. He uses this as manipulation in an attempt to win Helen's favour. When it doesn't work, he starts speculating that she cannot manage her life after leaving Arthur without a man's protection and supervision.

Gilbert's mother, Mrs Markham, holds the doctrine prevailing at the time that it is "the husband's business to please himself, and hers [i.e. the wife's] to please him". The portrayal of Helen, courageous and independent, emphasizes her capacity for seeking autonomy rather than submitting to male authority, and the corrective role of women in relation to men. The Tenant of Wildfell Hall is thus considered a feminist novel by many critics.

=== Displacement ===
Josephine McDonagh believes that the theme of displacement is underlined by the title of the novel: Helen is the tenant, not an owner-occupier, of Wildfell Hall, the place of her birth, which was bequeathed to a male descendant, her brother. The Tenant features numerous allusions to a wide range of other texts, from the Bible to contemporary novels. Apart from being used as a quotation, allusions are often applied by peculiar characters to reflect their personalities. Sometimes the individual voices of characters are shown as a patchwork of quotations. Such "borrowed voices" may denote the displacement of the main heroes – Gilbert, being a well-educated man with high ambitions for some "great achievements", is forced to take over his father's farm, and Helen, being a runaway wife, can call neither her home nor her name her own. The emphasis on allusions in the novel, on using the "language of others", according to McDonagh, may be a reflection on the position of being a tenant, which in its subjugation is similar to that of being a wife.

=== Marriage ===
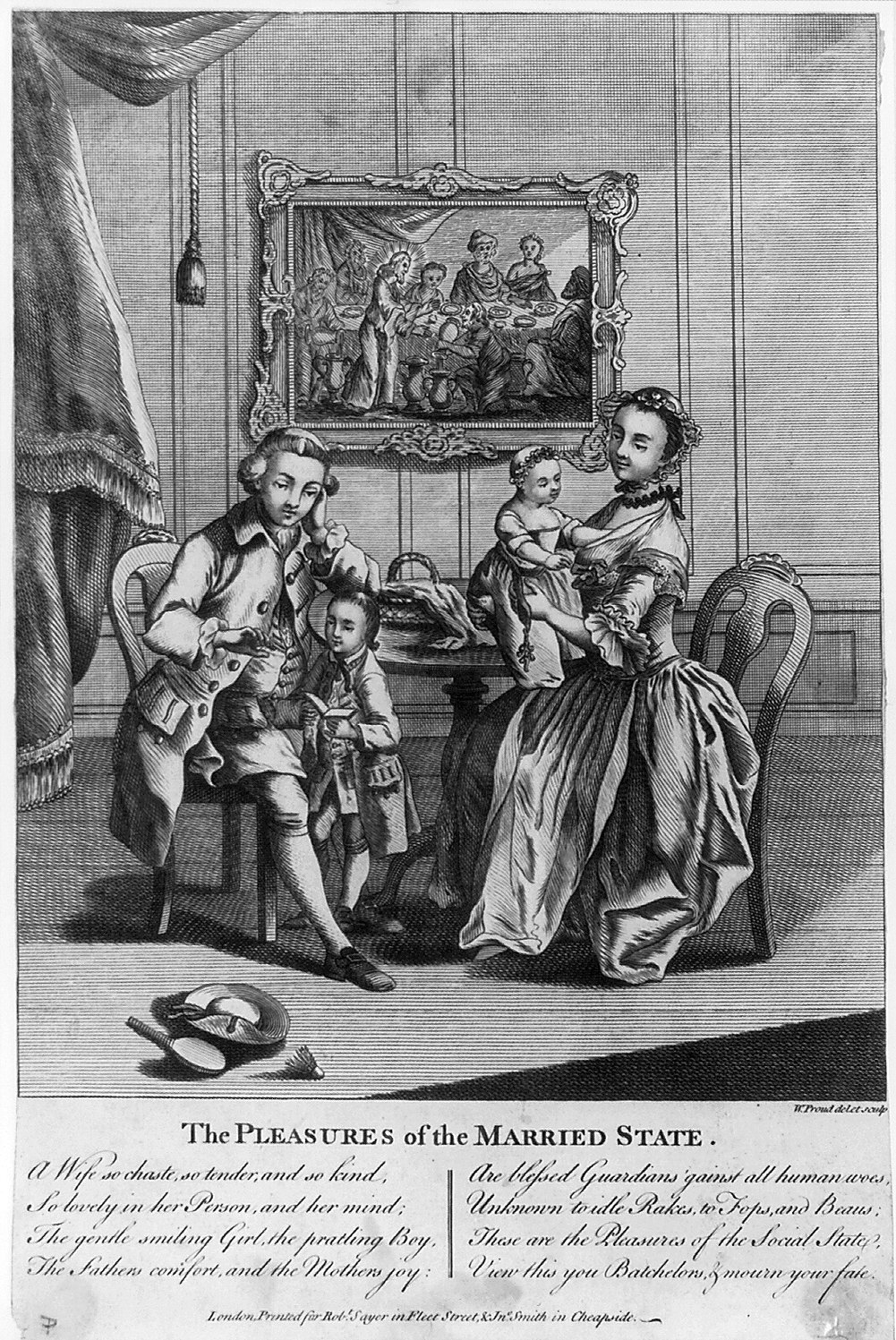
Portrait of an English married couple, circa 1780

Until the passing of the Married Women's Property Act in 1870 a wife had no independent existence under English law, and therefore no right to own property or to enter into contracts separately from her husband, or to sue for divorce, or for the control and custody of her children. As expressed in Hugo Black's dissent in United States v. Yazell, "This rule [coverture] has worked out in reality to mean that though the husband and wife are one, the one is the husband."

Helen is misled by ideas of romantic love and duty into the delusion that she can repair her husband's conduct. Hattersley declares that he wants a pliant wife who will not interfere with his fun, but the truth is that he really wants quite the opposite. Milicent cannot resist her mother's pressure, so she marries Ralph against her will. Wealthy Annabella wants only a title, while Lord Lowborough devotedly loves her. The social climber Jane Wilson seeks wealth.

=== Motherhood ===
Helen escapes from her husband, in violation of English law as it then was, not for her own sake but for young Arthur's. She wants to "obviate his becoming such a gentleman as his father".

=== Woman artist ===
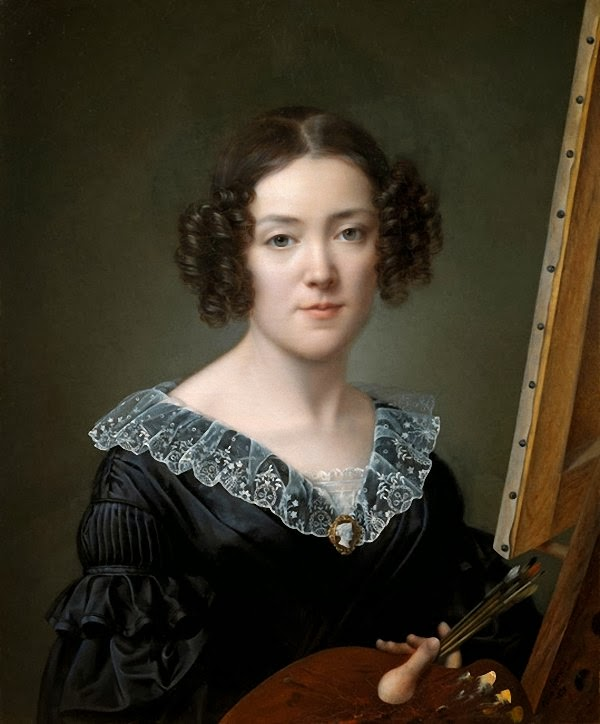
Self-portrait – one form of artist's self-identification

According to Stevie Davies, Anne's depiction of the woman as fee-earning artist "trebly trespasses on the domain of the masculine: female artists dabbed in water-colours or sketched decoratively in pen and ink; ladies did not engage in trade; and, besides, tools of her trade [legally belonging to her husband] in this case count as stolen." Melinda Maunsell believes that Helen is "both revealed and concealed by her artistic hand; providing her with an acceptable means of expression within her social construction, the artists hand also offers a form of independence, a possibility of earning a living, in a period when a woman had virtually no independent power base in any sphere."

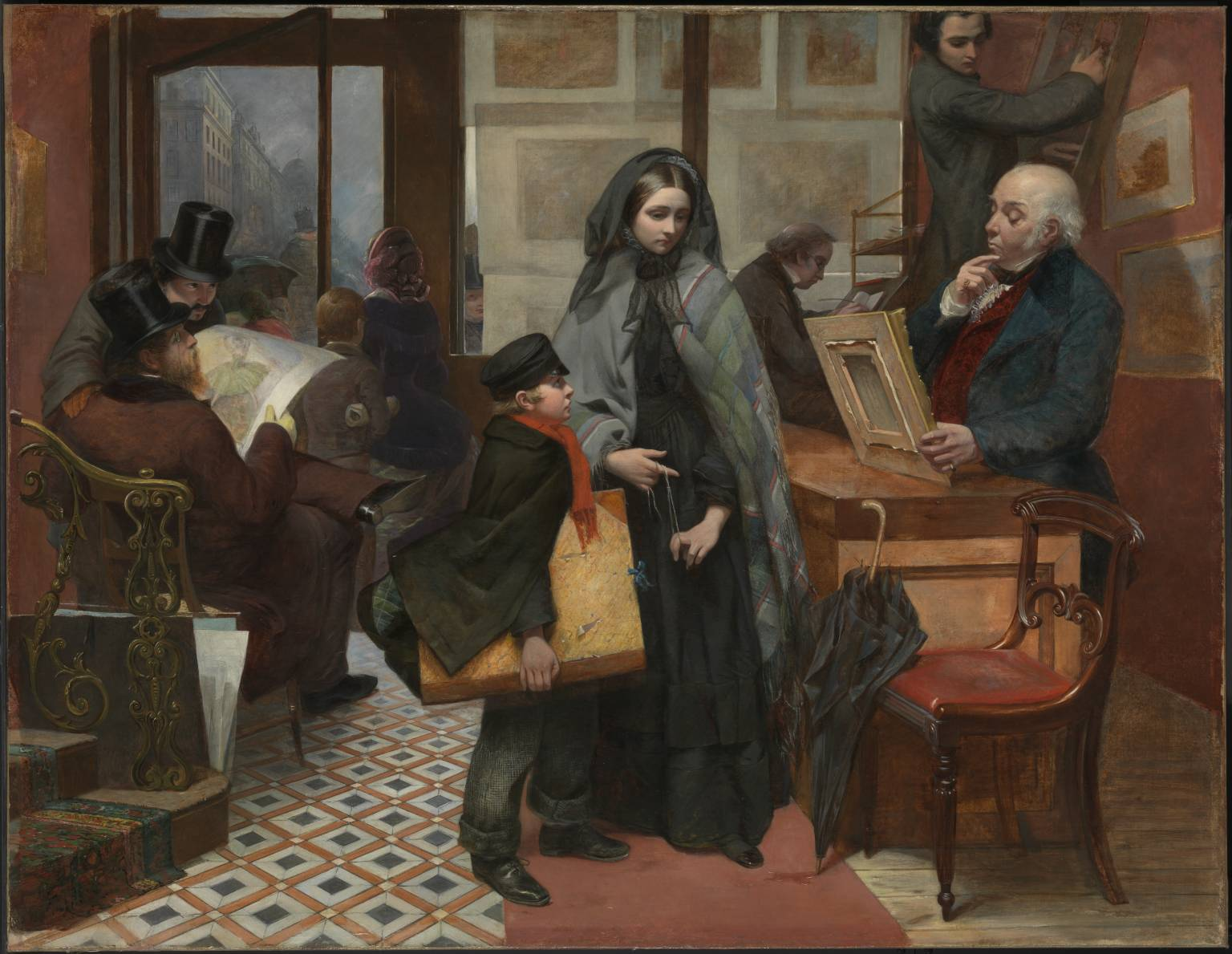
The story of Helen Graham, according to Samantha Ellis, may have inspired Emily Mary Osborn's painting Nameless and Friendless (1857), which depicts a widow attempting to make a living as an artist.

Nicole A. Diederich has argued that in The Tenant Anne Brontë constructs marriage and remarriage as a comparative and competitive practice that restricts Helen's rights and talents. Helen's artistic ability plays a central role in her relationships with both Gilbert and Arthur. Her alternating freedom to paint and inability to do so on her own terms not only complicate Helen's definition as wife, widow, and artist, but also enable Anne Brontë to criticize the domestic sphere as established by marriage and re-established with remarriage.

At the beginning of her diary, the young and unmarried Helen already defines herself as an artist. Her early drawings reveal her private and true feelings for Arthur Huntingdon, feelings that lead her to overlook his true character and lose herself to marriage. Nevertheless, in addition to revealing Helen's true desires, the self-expression of her artwork also defines her as an artist. That she puts so much of herself into her paintings and drawings attests to this self-definition. After her marriage to Arthur, Helen, accepting the roles of wife and housekeeper, rarely refers to herself as an artist. The marital laws of the day made Helen's artworks legally belong to her husband and allowed Arthur to destroy them when he discovered her plans to earn money by selling paintings. Diederich calls it "an ironic echo" of Helen's destruction of Arthur's portrait just before their engagement when he tried to take it from her. Diederich also points that in attempt to become a fee-earning artist "Helen reclaims her artistic talent as her own, distinct from her husband's possession of her art, and of her."

Posing as a widow, Helen makes her role as an artist who sells her works, especially to support a child, more socially acceptable. Resembling the time of Arthur's courtship, when Helen's portraits of him betrayed her affection, artwork once again serves the autobiographical role during her meetings with Gilbert – the painting of Wildfell Hall deceptively labelled "Fernley Manor" discloses her precarious position as a runaway wife. Showing Gilbert handling Helen's paintings without her permission, Brontë, according to Diederich, "hints that remarriage to Gilbert may not hold any greater promise to Helen's self-definition and freedom as an artist than did her first marriage". However, unlike Arthur, Gilbert shows much more esteem for Helen's artwork. Diederich concludes that "the domestic realm, whether established with marriage or re-established in remarriage, doesn't support women's self-definition as artists, nor does it provide a structured setting for the unfettered expression of their talents" and that The Tenant calls for "more support for married and remarried women's legal rights and artistic opportunities in nineteenth-century Britain".

=== Universal salvation ===
Universalist ideas in The Tenant contradicted prevailing Protestant doctrine in England and thus advocated a socially unacceptable view. Helen expresses several times in the story her belief in eventual universal salvation for all souls. She does not reassure the elder Arthur about this on his deathbed because she wants him to repent of his wrongdoing on his own accord. Despite his inability to do so, Helen still believes in his redemption.

== Style and narrative ==
=== Realism ===
Unlike her elder sisters, Anne Brontë did not follow the Romantic style in her two novels, opting instead for Realism. Many critics, including Anne's sister Charlotte, (Note: In her letter to W.S. Williams on 5 September 1850 Charlotte wrote: "The choice of subject in [The Tenant] is a mistake, it was too little consonant with the character, tastes and ideas of the gentle, retiring inexperienced writer.") considered her depiction of alcoholism and adultery overly graphic and disturbing. In defence, Anne openly stated her writer's intentions in the preface to the second edition of the novel.

When we have to do with vice and vicious characters, I maintain it is better to depict them as they really are than as they would wish to appear. To represent a bad thing in its least offensive light, is doubtless the most agreeable course for a writer of fiction to pursue; but is it the most honest, or the safest? Is it better to reveal the snares and pitfalls of life to the young and thoughtless traveller, or to cover them with branches and flowers?

Often, when depicting the same subject as her sisters, Anne presents it in a completely different light: Wildfell Hall, an old superannuated mansion, she pictures not as a 'haunted' house like Thornfield Hall or Wuthering Heights in her sisters' works, but as a decayed relic of an outworn patrician class, whose pretensions are mocked by the recrudescence of building into moor. Stevie Davies has argued that Anne's ancient hall demystifies Gothic. Wildfell Hall is not haunted, it is simply dilapidated, damp and un-welcoming.

Anne's portrayal of Arthur Huntingdon deflates the Byronic cult – while witty, adventurous and handsome, he is not endowed with intellectual gifts, nor even vitality, famously exhibited by Heathcliff, and has nothing of the fundamental goodness that finally redeemed Rochester. All Huntingdon's vices come from his being spoilt as a child. Analyzing the lack of sense and reason amongst males as the consequence of value-system based on the worship of machismo, Anne depicts the pathetic end of her main hero, brought on by his drinking habits. Totally dependent on his estranged wife in his final illness, Arthur Huntingdon ultimately loses all his personality.

According to Caroline Franklin, Anne Brontë uses the Byronic paradigm "not to titillate, but to shock" – her protest against spousal abuse needs no scandal-mongering allusions to be sensational. The character of Helen Graham may have been inspired by Anna Isabella Milbanke, the wife of Lord Byron, who also thought at first that her religious obligation was to improve her husband's behavior, but very soon she was disillusioned, separated from him and raised their child alone. Despite this, she – like Helen – believed in the ultimate salvation of her husband's soul.

In The Tenant vice is not unique to the men. Lady Lowborough's adultery has a particularly devastating effect on her husband, and the malice of Eliza Millward is poisonous to the entire community. The eternal struggle between good and evil is emphasised by heavy use of biblical references: sinners who repent and listen to reason are brought within the fold, while those who remain stubborn tend to meet violent or miserable ends.

=== Sisters' connection ===
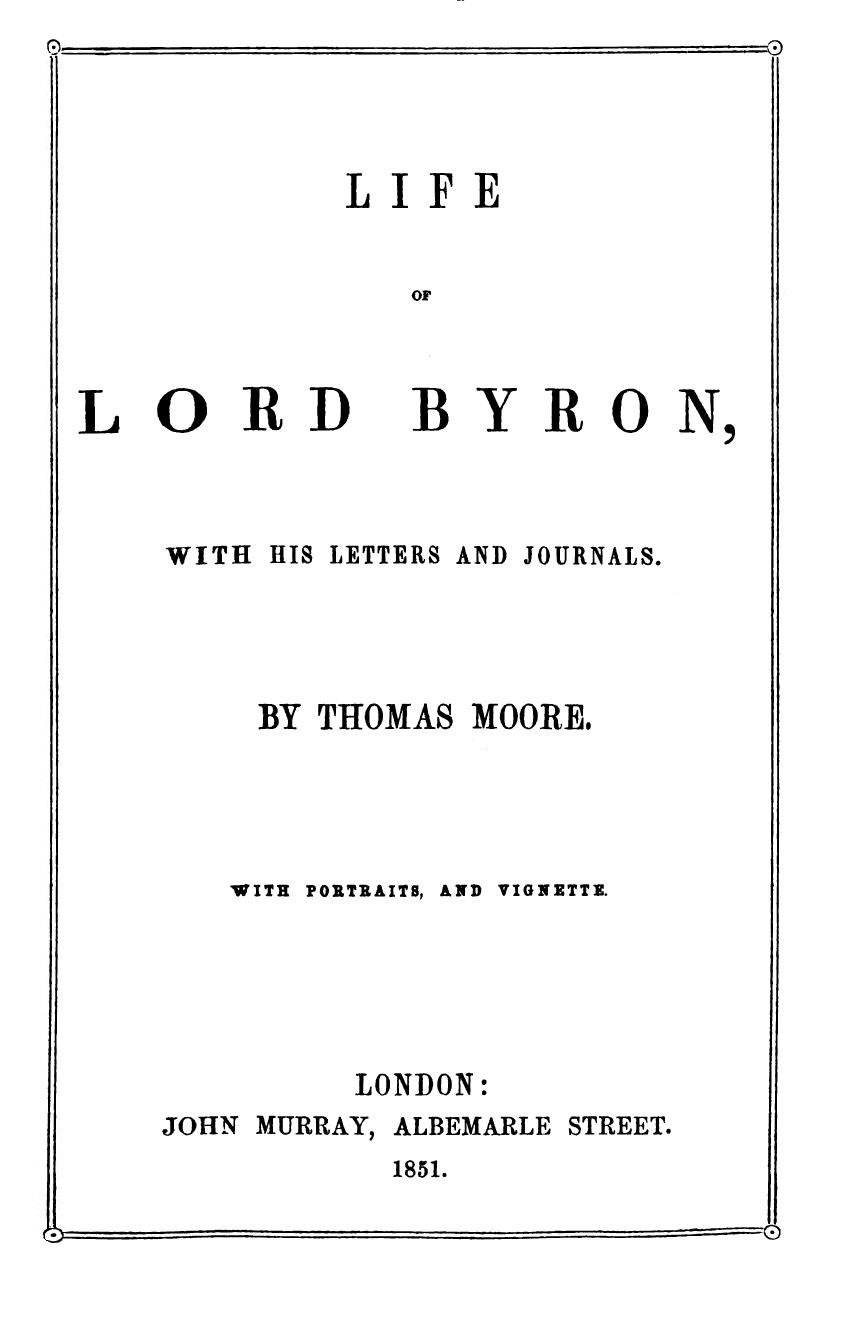
Thomas Moore's biography of Byron

Stevie Davies believes that the settings and characters in The Tenant are influenced by Anne's juvenile fiction. In their childhood Emily and Anne Brontë created the imaginary kingdom of Gondal, about which they composed prose and poems. Thomas Moore's biography of Byron, with its description of womanizing, gaming and carousing, directly influenced the Gondal mythos and was echoed in Brontë's adult works. The characteristics of Arthur Huntington and Annabella Wilmot, both self-indulgent sexual transgressors, may be the relics of Gondal, where most of the main heroes were extravagant and led adventurous lives.

Four houses in the younger Brontës' novels have "W. H." initials: Wellwood House in Agnes Grey, the eponymous mansion in Wuthering Heights, and Wildfell Hall and Woodford Hall in The Tenant. The original "Ur-hall" in Gondal may be the source of inspiration for at least two of them—Wuthering Heights and Wildfell Hall. Citing all this, Davies concludes that Charlotte's statement that Anne "hated her work [on The Tenant]" is not credible.

=== Framed narration ===
Notwithstanding Anne's repudiation of the Gothic atmosphere, The Tenant's narrative structure is common to Gothic fiction with the usage of framing narrator, letters and diary as clues to a whole truth. However, the narrator, Gilbert Markham, differs from his gothic predecessors in that he and the official standards he represents are shown to be in part the cause of the shocking reality he encounters. Chapters formed from Helen's diary strictly follow its style and differ from Gilbert's narrative. His story is also taken from his own diary. Such adherence to the diaries may be considered as a 'testimony of experience'. Since the Renaissance writing a diary had been a popular form of documenting and expressing personal opinions.

Naomi Jacobs argues that "the displacement [of framing narration by the inner] is exactly the point of the novel, which subjects its readers to a shouldering-aside of familiar notions and comfortable perceptions of the world", and both narrations and jarring discrepancies of tone and perspective between them are essential to the purpose. In The Tenant, like in Wuthering Heights, a horrific reality of private life is obtained after passing through the voice of a framing narrator. According to Jacobs, the male narrator represents the public world, and the framed structure serves several functions that are strongly gender-related: it illustrates the process of going behind the official version of reality in order to approach the truth that the culture prefers to deny; it exemplifies the ways in which domestic reality is obscured by layers of conventional ideology; and it replicates the cultural split between male and female spheres that is shown to be one of the sources of the tragedy in the novel. Jacobs concludes that both Emily and Anne seemed to find it necessary, in approaching subjects that were considered to be controversial, to use the voice of a male narrator, appropriating, delegitimizing and even ridiculing his power, before telling anti-patriarchal truth.

Carol A. Senf believes that the "unique narrative structure, the wife's story framed by that of her husband... encourages the reader to focus on questions of gender". According to Tess O'Toole, the architecture of Brontë's narrative stresses and calls attention to the disjunction of two different forms of domestic containment, one deriving from marriage, the other from the natal family. Priti Joshi, noting Helen and Gilbert's suspicion of spoken words and reliance on the visual, and their faith in the written word, concludes that a diary is a fitting narrative device because the characters require it, and that the epistolary narrative form reflects this faith.

=== Direct speech ===
Josephine McDonagh believes that some of the stylistic features of The Tenant may be influenced by the print culture of the Brontës' time. For example, Anne's concern to preserve the integrity of each of her narrators' voices is similar to magazine structure that maintains the voice of individual contributors. The novel's labyrinthine structure is established by the application of direct speech. Gilbert's letter incorporates Helen's diary; and in turn, Helen's diary includes Arthur's autobiographical reminiscences.

== Genre ==
=== From social comedy to social drama ===
Anne Brontë starts her novel in a social comedy manner, reminiscent of Jane Austen. Like Pride and Prejudice, The Tenant of Wildfell Hall starts with the arrival of a new person in a neighbourhood—a source of curiosity for a small rural community. Unlike Austen, Brontë makes a woman the centre of interest. Reticent Mrs Graham with her views on alcohol consumption and girls' education, controversial for the 19th century, soon becomes an outcast.

=== Domestic drama ===
Tess O'Toole calls The Tenant "the most unusual example of 19th century domestic fiction", and attributes to that the relative marginalization of the novel in the Brontë sisters' oeuvre. According to O'Toole, Anne, unlike her elder sisters, seems to juxtapose rather than to collapse kinship and sexual relations. The relationship between Frederick and Helen is insular and cannot solve all the problems or contradictions that cluster around the concept of the domestic.

Helen's retreat from her husband is followed by a return to her natal family origins, symbolized by her return to the home in which she was born, and adoption of her mother's maiden name as her alias. The relationship between Helen and Frederick, sister and brother, who spent all their childhood apart and reunited only as adults, is foregrounded to domestic reform – Frederick's virtue compensates for their father's neglect of Helen, and their comfortable relationship, defined by mutual respect and understanding, contrasts with Helen's problematic relationship with her husband and her suitor.

=== Novel of ideas ===
In the third chapter The Tenant changes tone to the novel of ideas. In a powerfully argued Miltonic debate about virtue, experience, choice and temptation, Helen challenges the segregated education of the two sexes, with its over-exposure for boys and over-protection for girls.

The novel's critique of libertine men may be influenced by the works of Mary Wollstonecraft. Priti Joshi, believing that Anne had read her works, argues that she not only refuses the Wollstonecraftian indictment of the feminine, but also rejects its elevation, articulated by Hannah More. Anne Brontë's feminism, in Joshi's words, "forges a path between the extremes of Wollstonecraft-More spectrum". In The Tenant, a reformed masculinity emerges not, as More would have it, under the tutelage of a woman, but by emulating feminine ways. Anne presents the "idle talk" of Linden-Car villagers primary as a way of creating fellowship and community, not only as vicious gossip. According to Joshi, the gossip of middle-class Linden-Car functions not as a critique of the behavior, but rather to heighten its contrast with the chilling atmosphere of the upper-class estate.

While refusing to believe whispered insinuations, the main heroes are led astray by precisely the evidence of their eyes: Gilbert, spying Helen walking with Frederick, mistakenly takes them to be lovers, and Helen's naïve empiricism leads her to disastrous marriage. Helen's faith in the written word and the class reserve that lead her to confide her troubles to diary, "the best friend I could have for the purpose [of a confidential talk]", is also shown as folly when her husband confiscates the diary and reads its contents.

== Criticism ==
=== Contemporary reviews ===
The Tenant of Wildfell Hall challenged the prevailing morals of the Victorian era. Especially shocking was Helen's slamming of her bedroom door in the face of her husband after continuing abuse. Charles Kingsley, in his review for Fraser's Magazine wrote: "A people's novel of a very different school is The Tenant of Wildfell Hall. It is, taken altogether, a powerful and an interesting book. Not that it is a pleasant book to read, nor, as we fancy, has it been a pleasant book to write; still less has it been a pleasant training which could teach an author such awful facts, or give courage to write them. The fault of the book is coarseness—not merely that coarseness of subject which will be the stumbling-block of most readers, and which makes it utterly unfit to be put into the hands of girls ..." Despite this, he believed that: "[English] society owes thanks, not sneers, to those who dare to shew her the image of her own ugly, hypocritical visage".

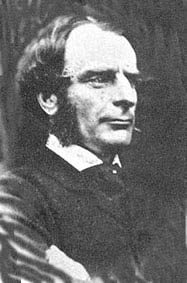
Charles Kingsley believed that English society "owes thanks, not sneers" to Anne Brontë

The Spectator wrote: "The Tenant of Wildfell Hall, like its predecessor [Jane Eyre], (Note: Mostly because Charlotte, Emily, and Anne published their works under pseudonyms (they respectively were Currer, Ellis, and Acton Bell), many critics initially believed that Agnes Grey, Jane Eyre, Wuthering Heights and The Tenant of Wildfell Hall were written by the same person.) suggests the idea of considerable abilities ill applied. There is power, effect, and even nature, though of an extreme kind, in its pages; but there seems in the writer a morbid love for the coarse, not to say the brutal; so that his level subjects are not very attractive, and the more forcible are displeasing or repulsive, from their gross, physical, or profligate substratum. He might reply, that such things are in life... Mere existence, however, as we have often had occasion to remark, is not a sufficient reason for a choice of subject: its general or typical character is a point to consider, and its power of pleasing must be regarded, as well as its mere capabilities of force or effect. It is not only the subject of this novel, however, that is objectionable, but the manner of treating it. There is a coarseness of tone throughout the writing of all these Bells [Charlotte, Emily and Anne Brontë], that puts an offensive subject in its worst point of view, and which generally contrives to dash indifferent things".

A critic in The Athenaeum, probably H. F. Chorley, cited The Tenant as "the most entertaining novel we have read in a month past". However, he warned the authors, having in mind all the novels from Currer, Ellis and Acton Bell published by 1848, "against their fancy for dwelling upon what is disagreeable".

The Examiner, while praising all Brontës as "a hardy race", who "do not lounge in drawing-rooms or boudoirs", and "not common-place writers", considered The Tenant's frame structure "a fatal error: for, after so long and minute a history [of Helen's marriage to Arthur], we cannot go back and recover the enthusiasm which we have been obliged to dismiss a volume and half before". The gossiping of the inhabitants of Linden-Car village reminded it of Jane Austen's style, but "with less of that particular quality which her dialogues invariably possessed". Considering the novel's structure as "faulty", Examiner concludes that "it is scarcely possible to analyze [the novel]".

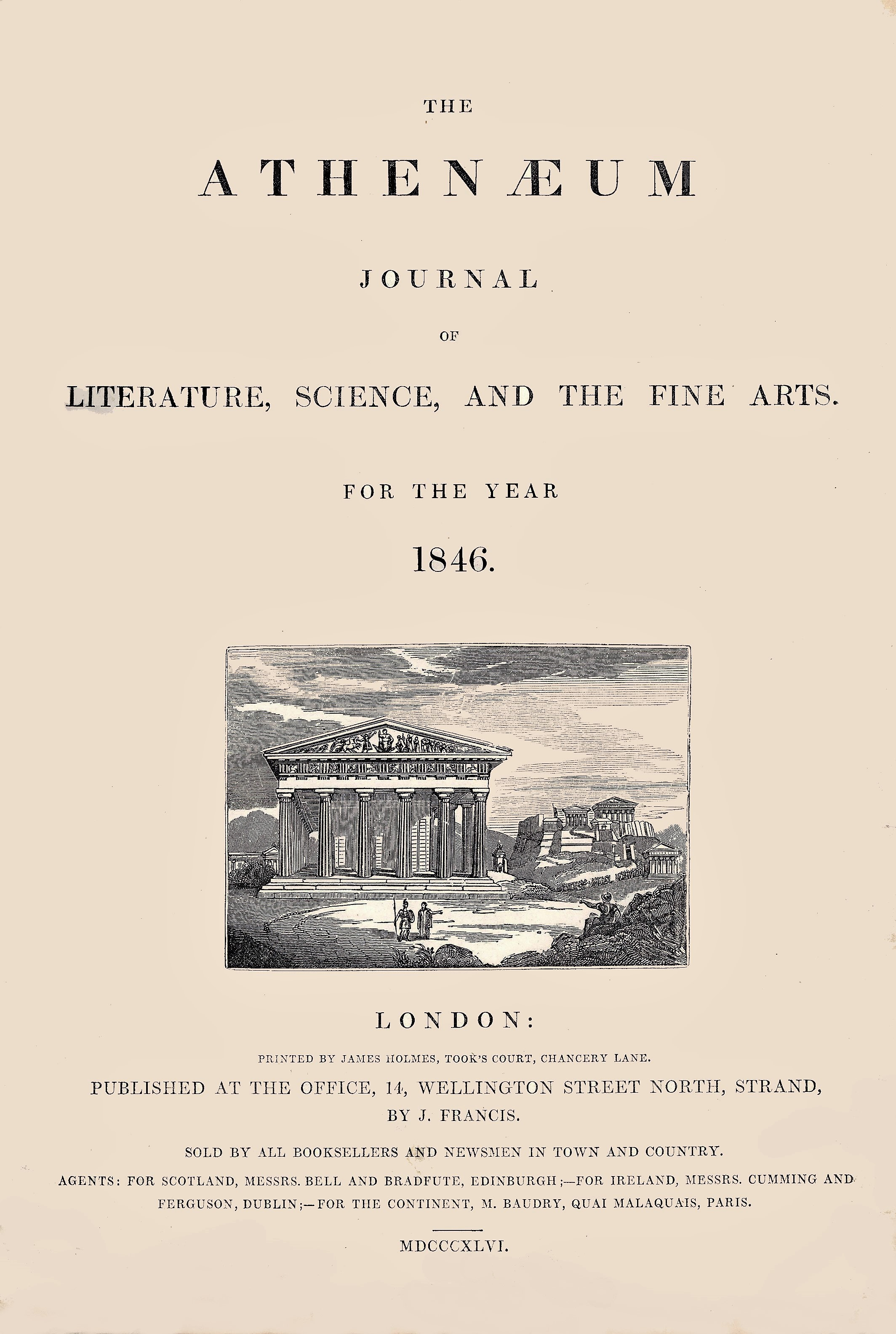
The Athenaeum was one of a few magazines that was not hostile towards The Tenant of Wildfell Hall

An American magazine Literature World, believing all the novels by Currer, Ellis and Acton Bell were produced by the same person, praised their author as a genius, who can make "his incongruities appear natural". Noting, that "all that is good or attractive about [the male characters in The Tenant] is or might be womanish" it supposes that the author may be "some gifted and retired woman". Despite considering The Tenant "infinitely inferior" to Jane Eyre, Literature World admits that the two novels share "the same mysterious word-painting" with which the author "conveys the scene he (or she) describes to the mind's eye, so as not only to impress it with the mere view, but to speak, as it were, to the imagination, to the inner sense, as is ever the case with the Poetry as the Painting of real genius". Again having in mind both Jane Eyre and The Tenant, it concludes: "However objectionable these works may be to crude minds which cannot winnow the chaff vulgarity from the rich grain of genius which burdens them, very many, while enjoying the freshness and vigour, will gladly hail their appearance, as boldly and eloquently developing blind places of wayward passion in the human heart, which is far more interesting to trace than all bustling traces and murky alleys, through which the will-o'-the-wisp genius of Dickens has so long led the public mind".

Edwin Percy Whipple from North American Review considered The Tenant "less unpleasant" than Wuthering Heights. However, both novels, in his opinion, were constructed with an "excessive clumsiness" and "the brutal element of human nature" was equally "given prominence" in them. He continues: "[The Tenant] seems a convincing proof, that there is nothing kindly in [this]author's powerful mind, and that, if he continues to write novels, he will introduce into the land of romance a larger number of hateful men and women than any other author of the day". In Gilbert he sees "nothing good, except rude honesty", and while acknowledging Helen's "strong-mindedness", he finds no "lovable or feminine virtues". Despite this, Whipple praised novels characterization: "All the characters are drawn with great power and precision of outline, and the scenes are vivid as the life itself." Helen's marriage to Arthur he sees as "a reversal of the process carried on in Jane Eyre", but Arthur Huntingdon, in his opinion, is "no Rochester". "He is never virtuously inclined, except in those periods of illness and feebleness which his debaucheries have occasioned". Whipple concludes: "The reader of Acton Bell gains no enlarged view of mankind, giving a healthy action to his sympathies, but is confined to a narrow space of life, and held down, as it were, by main force, to witness the wolfish side of his nature literally and logically set forth. But the criminal courts are not the places in which to take a comprehensive view of humanity and the novelist who confines his observation to them is not likely to produce any lasting impression except of horror and disgust".

Sharpe's London Magazine, believing "despite reports to the contrary" that "[no] woman could have written such a work", (Note: Despite this, it argued that "no man would have made his sex appear at once coarse, brutal, and contemptibly weak, at once disgusting and ridiculous" and concluded that "a possible solution of the enigma is, that it may be the production of an authoress assisted by her husband, or some other male friend: if this be not the case, we would rather decide on the whole, that it is a man's writing.") warned its readers, especially ladies, against reading The Tenant. While acknowledging "the powerful interest of the story", "the talent with which it is written" and an "excellent moral", it argued that "like the fatal melody of the Syren's song, its very perfections render it more dangerous, and therefore more carefully to be avoided". In Sharpe's opinion, the novel's "evils which render the work unfit for perusal" arose from "a perverted taste and an absence of mental refinement in the writer, together with a total ignorance of the usages of good society". It argues that the scenes of debauchery "are described with a disgustingly truthful minuteness, which shows the writer to be only too well acquainted with the revolting details of such evil revelry" and considers it a final "proof of the unreadableness of these volumes". Helen's belief in Universal salvation was also castigated: "The dangerous tendency of such a belief must be apparent to any one who gives the subject a moment's consideration; and it becomes scarcely necessary, in order to convince our readers of the madness of trusting to such a forced distortion of the Divine attribute of mercy, to add that this doctrine is alike repugnant to Scripture, and in direct opposition to the teaching of the Anglican Church".

The Rambler, arguing that Jane Eyre and The Tenant were written by the same person, stated that the latter is "not so bad a book as Jane Eyre", which it believed to be "one of the coarsest of the books we ever perused". The Reverend Michael Millward was considered by Rambler as "one of the least disagreeable individuals" in the novel, while Helen's Universalist views were criticised as either "false and bad" or "vague and unmeaning". It concludes: "Unless our authoress can contrive to refine and elevate her general notions of all human and divine things, we shall be glad to learn that she is not intending to add another work to those which have already been produced by her pen".

G. H. Lewes, in Leader Magazine, shortly after Anne's death, wrote: "Curious enough is to read Wuthering Heights and The Tenant of Wildfell Hall, and remember that the writers were two retiring, solitary, consumptive girls! Books, coarse even for men, coarse in language and coarse in conception, the coarseness apparently of violence and uncultivated men – turn out to be the productions of two girls living almost alone, filling their loneliness with quiet studies, and writing their books from a sense of duty, hating the pictures they drew, yet drawing them with austere conscientiousness! There is matter here for the moralist or critic to speculate on".

=== Suppression and subsequent criticism ===
A great success on initial publication, The Tenant was almost forgotten in subsequent years. When it became due for a reprint, just over a year after Anne's death, Charlotte prevented its re-publication. (The novel was out of print in England until 1854, but not in America, which had no copyright restriction.) Some critics believe that Charlotte's suppression of the book was to protect her younger sister's memory from further onslaughts. Others believe Charlotte was jealous of her younger sister. Even before Anne's death Charlotte had criticized the novel, stating in a letter to W.S. Williams: "That it had faults of execution, faults of art, was obvious, but faults of intention of feeling could be suspected by none who knew the writer. For my part, I consider the subject unfortunately chosen – it was one the author was not qualified to handle at once vigorously and truthfully. The simple and natural – quiet description and simple pathos – are, I think Acton Bell's forte. I liked Agnes Grey better than the present work." Juliet Barker, in her biography of the Brontës, concluded that "Charlotte, it appears, was prepared to consign her sister's novel to oblivion because she considered its subject at odds with her own perception of what Anne's character was and ought to have been."

Elizabeth Gaskell repeated Charlotte's words about Anne in The Life of Charlotte Brontë, claiming that the subject of The Tenant "was painfully discordant to one who would fain have sheltered herself from all but peaceful and religious ideas". In his essay on Emily Brontë, Algernon Charles Swinburne briefly mentioned The Tenant in the context of Branwell's decline as a novel "which deserves perhaps a little more notice and recognition than it has ever received" and added that "as a study of utterly flaccid and invertebrate immorality it bears signs of more faithful transcription from life than anything in Jane Eyre or Wuthering Heights". Margaret Oliphant believed that Anne "would have no right to be considered at all as a writer but for her association with [her sisters'] imperative spirits". Mary Ward, a novelist, who was widely known for her anti-feminist views, in her introduction to 1900 edition of The Tenant, accused Anne of "the narrowness of view" and absence of "some subtle, innate correspondence between eye and brain, between brain and hand, [which] was present in Emily and Charlotte". She concluded that "it is not as the writer of Wildfell Hall, but as the sister of Charlotte and Emily Brontë, that Anne Brontë escapes oblivion." May Sinclair, while famously saying that "when [Anne] slammed the door of Mrs Huntingdon's bedroom she slammed it in the face of society and all existing moralities and conventions", considered that she "had no genius". Despite that, her opinion about The Tenant was unexpectedly high: "There are scenes, there are situations, in Anne's amazing novel, which for sheer audacity stand alone in mid-Victorian literature, and which would hold their own in the literature of revolt that followed ... Her diagnosis of certain states, her realization of certain motives, suggests Balzac rather than any of the Brontës." In her introduction to the 1914 edition of the novel Sinclair was also ambivalent about Anne and her novel — while acclaiming it as "the first presentment of that Feminist novel", she stated that "it bores to tears". Her opinion of Helen was also mixed: "If Agnes Grey is a little prig, Helen Huntingdon is a prig enormous ... She is Anne Brontë's idea of noble womanhood, the first of the modern, large-souled, intellectual heroines." The only thing Sinclair wholly approved of was the author's treatment of marital laws of the time: "Anne Brontë attacks her problem with a freedom and audacity before which her sisters' boldest enterprises seem cowardly and restrained... She is apparently unaware that ... her behaviour is the least unusual, not to say revolutionary."

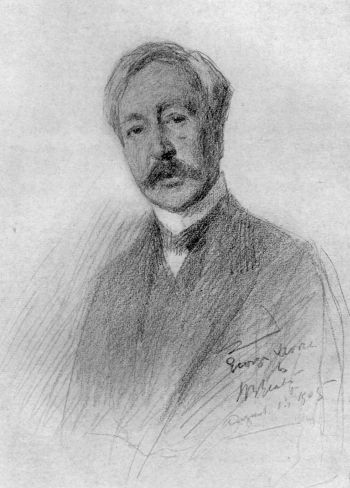
Novelist George Moore, an admirer of Anne Brontë's novels

Despite the general dismissiveness of the late 19th–early 20th century critics, Anne still had supporters in literary circles. Esther Alice Chadwick, while believing that Anne lacked "the fire and passion of her sisters" and was "inferior" to them, claimed that she is still "a character well worth studying". Chadwick also considered The Tenant to be "probably the first temperance novel". George Moore, an Anglo-Irish writer, was an admirer of Anne Brontë's novels; he believed that Anne "had all the qualities of Jane Austen and other qualities", that "she could write with heat", and if "she had lived ten years longer she would have taken a place beside Jane Austen, perhaps even a higher place". He declared that The Tenant had "the rarest literary quality of heat", and blamed Charlotte Brontë for her youngest sister's loss of reputation.

Only in 1929 the first dedicated biography of Anne came out – it was a short monograph by W. T. Hale, (Note: Hale was, according to Elizabeth Langland, chauvinistic in his views on Anne's life. He concluded his monograph by stating that "the Gods were not kind to [Anne]: no men except her father's curates ever had a chance to look at her. But the gods must have loved her, after all, for they did not prolong her agony. They let her die young," thus emphasizing men's attention over her literary achievements.) where he stated that in the "ideas and situations", presented in The Tenant, Anne "was way ahead of her times" and that "she rushed in where Thackeray dared not tread." However, Hale believed that Anne "will never be known to fame either as novelist or poet, but only as the sister of Charlotte and Emily."

In 1959, two biographies were published: Anne Brontë, her life and work by Ada Harrison and Derek Stanford and Anne Brontë by Winifred Gérin. Noting that The Tenant was published some ten years before George Eliot's novels, Harrison and Stanford named Anne the "first realist woman writer" in Great Britain. Unlike some early critics, who considered the scenes of debauchery improbable, Harrison and Stanford believed them to be "described in a fashion which Zola might have admired". Winifred Gérin believed Helen Graham to be "one of the first married women in fiction who is both competent and resolved to keep herself not by any of the accepted means as housekeeper, companion or governess, but as a painter, selling her canvasses to dealers." Despite this, in her later work on the Brontës, Gérin dismissed The Tenant as being "written too obviously as a work of propaganda, a treatise against drunkenness, to be considered a work of art". Several years later, however, Gérin wrote an introduction to The Tenant, where, while considering the framed structure in both The Tenant and Wuthering Heights a "clumsy devise", acknowledged Anne's "pre-eminent gift of story-teller" and "eloquence in proclaiming the equality of men and women". She believed that The Tenant "might be said to be the first manifesto for 'Women's Lib'". Inga-Stina Ewbank considered Anne the least talented of the sisters and claimed that the framing structure – where "Helen can reveal her innermost being to the diary" while Gilbert is "bound to be as objective as possible" – "throws the novel out of balance". However, she believed that "through the very nature of its central concern, The Tenant is feminist in the deepest sense of the word."

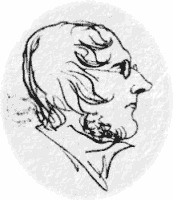
Branwell Brontë

Daphne du Maurier discussed The Tenant in the context of the biography of Anne's brother, Branwell Brontë. Du Maurier praised the narrative structure, "two separate stories most cleverly combined in one", and believed Gilbert Markham "with his utter confidence in his powers of attracting the opposite sex" to be modelled on Branwell. Presuming that he was familiar with his sisters' novels, du Maurier believed that the story of Helen's marital life with Arthur Huntingdon may have been "a warning to Branwell" and the relationship between "erring, neglectful husband" and "the pious, praying wife" resembles Branwell's views on the marriage of Lydia Robinson, the woman at whose house he was employed as a tutor to her son, while Anne was governess to her daughters. Du Maurier concluded that in childhood years Branwell "shared in his sister's writings; somehow he must continue to live out their characters in the world of his imagination".

In her early essays on Anne Brontë's novels and poetry Muriel Spark praised her proficiency. She believed that Charlotte was a "harsh sister to Anne" and "had she taken an impartial view of Wildfell Hall, she must have discovered its merits." Despite a notion that Charlotte and Emily were "more gifted", Spark stated that "[Anne's] writings none the less take no mean place in nineteenth-century literature." However, some forty years later, in the introduction to The Essence of the Brontës, Spark radically changed her views on Anne: "I do not now agree with my former opinion on Anne Brontë's value as a writer. I think her works are not good enough to be considered in any serious context of the nineteenth century novel or that there exists any literary basis for comparison with the brilliant creative works of Charlotte and Emily... She was a writer who could 'pen' a story well enough; she was a literary equivalent of a decent water-colourist."

Only in the last decades of the 20th century The Tenant began to get critical acclaim. Elizabeth Langland in her 1989 monograph Anne Brontë: The Other One said: "It is worth pausing briefly to reflect on what might have been Anne's fate had The Tenant of Wildfell Hall been re-published with Agnes Grey so that critics could re-acquaint themselves with Anne's greater novel and so that critics could take that opportunity to measure the substantial artistic growth between the two novels." Langland argued that the heroines in Anne's novels influenced those of Charlotte, and named Anne among the first women writers to adopt a woman as narrator. Langland concluded that "if Charlotte Brontë was radical in claiming sexual identity for women, then Anne Brontë was radical in claiming professional identity for women." Robert Liddell, noting Anne's apparent distaste for Romantic tradition, claimed that The Tenant criticized both Branwell's life and Wuthering Heights. Edward Chitham in A Life of Anne Brontë (1991) also juxtaposed the novels of Anne and her sisters'. He stated that in Anne's view Wuthering Heights exhibited elements which she called in the preface to the second edition of The Tenant a "soft nonsense", thus making "almost an accusation against Emily". Unlike Chitham and Liddell, Maria H. Frawley identified the central element in The Tenant as the criticism of 19th century domestic ideology that encouraged women to "construct themselves as ethereal angels of morality and virtue". Betty Jay, analyzing Helen's marital experience, concluded that The Tenant "not only demonstrates that the individual is subject to powerful ideological forces which delineate his or her place within culture and society, but that there are ways in which these forces can be subverted and resisted by those who suffer as a result. In a narrative which dramatizes the complex interplay between subject and society by focusing on the marital experience of a woman, Brontë highlights the extent to which the internal and supposedly private realms of desire and domesticity are also intensely political."

The Tenant has established its reputation as a landmark feminist text. In her 1996 introduction to the novel, Stevie Davies called it "a feminist manifesto of revolutionary power and intelligence". The novel's framing structure, long dismissed as faulty, started to get acclaim as a fitting narrative device, essential to Anne's critical and artistic purposes.

On 5 November 2019, the BBC News listed The Tenant of Wildfell Hall on its list of the 100 most influential novels.

== Mutilated text ==
Although the publishers respected Charlotte's wishes, shortly before her death in 1854 the London firm of Thomas Hodgson issued a one-volume edition of The Tenant of Wildfell Hall. Hodgson performed extensive editing of the novel, removing many sections, including the chapter headings and the opening letter, that starts with: "To J. Halford, Esq. Dear Halford, When we were together last..." Other omissions ranged from single words to almost complete chapters (such as the 28th); some sections were completely rearranged in an attempt to compensate for the omissions. Most subsequent English editions, including those eventually produced by Charlotte's publisher, Smith, Elder & Co., followed this mutilated text. These copies are still prevalent today, despite notes on their covers claiming them to be complete and unabridged. In 1992, Oxford University Press published the Clarendon Edition of the novel, which is based on the first edition, but incorporating the preface and the corrections presented in the second edition.

== Adaptations ==
=== Radio ===
Ten episodes aired from 28 November to 9 December 2011 on BBC Radio 4, with Hattie Morahan as Helen, Robert Lonsdale as Gilbert and Leo Bill as Arthur.

=== Television ===
The novel has twice been adapted for television by the BBC. The first version, made in 1968, starred Janet Munro, Corin Redgrave, and Bryan Marshall. The second version, made in 1996, starred Tara Fitzgerald, Toby Stephens, Rupert Graves, and James Purefoy.

=== Theatrical and musical productions ===
The novel was adapted as a three-act opera at the University of Nebraska–Lincoln with music composed by Garrett Hope and libretto by Steven Soebbing.

The University of British Columbia adaptation of The Tenant of Wildfell Hall premiered in October 2015, adapted by Jacqueline Firkins and directed by Sarah Rogers.

In 2017 the novel was adapted by Deborah McAndrew and directed by Elizabeth Newman. The production opened in the Octagon Theatre, Bolton and then moved into York Theatre Royal.

The 2022 adaptation by Emme Hoy premiered at Roslyn Packer Theatre in Sydney, Australia on June 21. The production was directed by Jessica Arthur.

== Cultural references and legacy ==
The novel has the first known use of the phrase "tied to the apron string(s)", (Note: The phrase is uttered in chapter 3 by Gilbert Markham's mother, in a conversation with Helen: " ... he is my only treasure, and I am his only friend: so we don't like to be separated." "But, my dear, I call that doting," said my plain-spoken parent. "You should try to suppress such foolish fondness, as well to save your son from ruin as yourself from ridicule." "Ruin! Mrs. Markham!" "Yes; it is spoiling the child. Even at his age, he ought not to be always tied to his mother's apron-string; he should learn to be ashamed of it.") meaning overly attached to or controlled by a wife or mother. This sense derives from an earlier use of the term "apron-string" to describe property held jure uxoris (by right of one's wife).

In the Downton Abbey Christmas special (2011), The Tenant of Wildfell Hall is the book title acted out by Lady Mary Crawley in the Christmas charade.

Tina Connolly's 2013 novel Copperhead was inspired by The Tenant of Wildfell Hall. The name of the heroine is Helen Huntingdon and she also has a disastrous marriage.

Sam Baker's 2016 novel The Woman Who Ran is a modernized retelling, which takes inspiration from radical themes of Anne's novel. The heroine is a woman also called Helen, who hides from her past – an abusive marriage – in a present-day Yorkshire village.

In the 2018 The Guernsey Literary and Potato Peel Pie Society film adaptation, the protagonist Juliet Ashton (played by Lily James), argues about the novel's cultural significance: "In Wildfell Hall, Anne Brontë laid bare the essential imbalance of power between men and women in the suffocating hierarchical structure of Victorian marriage."

== See also ==
- List of feminist literature § 1840s
