= Hide and Seek (1964 film) =

1964 British film by Cy Endfield

- Directed by: Cy Endfield
- Written by: Robert Foshko; David Stone
- Based on: story by Harold Greene
- Produced by: Hal E. Chester
- Starring: Ian Carmichael; Curt Jurgens; Janet Munro; George Pravda
- Cinematography: Gilbert Taylor
- Edited by: Thelma Connell
- Music by: Gary Hughes; Muir Mathieson
- Production company: Spectrum Films
- Distributed by: British Lion Films; Albion Film Distributors
- Release date: 21 June 1964 (London)
- Running time: 90 minutes
- Country: United Kingdom
- Language: English

Hide and Seek is a 1964 British thriller film directed by Cy Endfield and starring Ian Carmichael, Curt Jurgens and Janet Munro. It was written by Robert Foshko and David Stone based on a story by Harold Greene. Cy Endfield made the film before Zulu (1964) but it was released afterwards. Carmichael called the film "a great disappointment".

== Plot ==
David Garrett is a professor of astrophysics at the University of Cambridge, working on tracking Russian rocket launches. He meets up with an old mentor and friend, Frank Melnicker, who is playing multiple games of chess at a display of simultaneous play at a temperance hall. Garrett is confused by the apparently secretive way that one player, Richter, transfers the knight chess piece to Melnicker. When Melnicker notices two individuals enter the hall he is distracted and excuses himself for the lunch break. Garrett offers to drive Melnicker to his hotel. There are two people waiting for Melnicker outside his hotel. When Garrett intimates that since they are in England that Melnicker could find safety, Melnicker cryptically tells Garrett that he should recall his seventh chess move.

Garrett's driver informs him that Major McPherson wishes to meet with him. At the meeting, the Major tells Garrett that he must stop socialising with Melnicker since he is a known communist.

Garrett arrives at the Ministry of Defence for a meeting, and while in the bathroom a box of chess pieces is dropped off to him that his driver believes he mistakenly left in the car. In fact, it was left by Melnicker. It contains the knight chess piece and a money belt containing a considerable amount of money. Garrett takes the chess piece and money belt with him and leaves the building to return to the hall where the chess demonstration was happening.

When he arrives at the hall he finds the display being torn down, with the demonstration cancelled due to Melnicker not returning after lunch. Garrett remembers the moves Melnicker had made and comes up with "king’s square four". When he goes outside and says this to a cabby, the cabby suggests "King’s Square" in Chelsea, which they drive to.

At the address, Garrett rings the doorbell to the flat and a young woman named Maggie calls to him from the second floor. She apparently is expecting him and throws down keys so he can let himself in. Others arrive, culminating in an entire wedding reception happening. Garrett is starting to doubt he is in the correct place, when he sees Maggie talking to Richter and finds a room upstairs with a chessboard that is missing the knight piece he has. Garrett has an opportunity to talk with Maggie and finds out she does know of Melnicker. Maggie then says she has to leave and Garrett leaves alone after copying down Maggie's phone number.

Outside Garrett realises two men are following him. A running chase happens, with Garrett avoiding the two men by hiding in a children's sandbox. Afterwards, Garrett calls Maggie and says he must meet up with her so he can return the money to Melnicker. Maggie tells Garrett to meet her at the train station, where she convinces him to board the train with her.

On the train, Garrett continues to ask Maggie where Melnicker is and where they are travelling to. Maggie seems to be avoiding committing to anything and Garrett resigns himself to continuing on the train for the time being. Sometime later Maggie goes out into the corridor to smoke a cigarette and notices two men she identifies as "secret police" that they must avoid. They are chased around in the train until Maggie pulls the emergency stop cord and she and Garrett jump off the train.

In the woods, Garrett gets caught in an animal snare, and Maggie goes to find a stick to help pry it open. Garrett frees himself and while wandering around he falls into a canal. Maggie jumps in to rescue Garrett since he says he cannot swim. They then find a boatman named Wilkins who welcomes them onto his houseboat to get dry. He shows them around his boat which he explains is part of his plan to leave civilisation behind. They end up drinking a lot of rum and spend the night on the boat. Maggie and Garrett are developing feelings for each other.

In the morning Maggie seems quite cold towards Garrett. Wilkins directs them to a nearby road so they can continue on their journey. Maggie deliberately reads the road sign incorrectly and makes them walk in the opposite direction to where they should be going. A car goes by, stops, and points out they are going the wrong way. When they approach the car they find the driver is Richter, who forces them into the car at gunpoint and they drive towards an isolated cliff top.

It appears that Richter plans to kill them and get rid of their bodies in the sea. Garrett and Richter fight, and Richter loses and goes over the side of the cliff to his apparent death. When Garrett gets to where he left Maggie, she and the car are gone.

Garrett starts to walk down the road and comes across a policeman on a bicycle who goes back to the cliff with him. The police officer seems to imply that they could just avoid reporting all this to avoid the effort, but Garrett wants to follow all official steps. They walk to a nearby hotel to use the phone. While the policeman is on one phone, Garrett uses another phone to call a colleague who works with him on the programme to monitor Russian rockets. He briefly explains he will return soon before hanging up. At this time he notices Maggie coming down the steps.

Garrett is confused as to why Maggie is in the hotel. She walks off, telling him that she had tried to tell him to just leave. At this point Hubert Marek comes down the stairs and introduces himself to Garrett. They walk together to a lounge where all the major people from the past days are waiting for them. Marek moves around the room, paying off each individual with large amounts of cash. It is revealed that this was all an elaborate trap to trick Garrett to "voluntarily" come to this hotel - he has been used like a pawn in a chess game. Marek has "sold" Garrett to the Russians for his knowledge and has arranged for a submarine to come before dawn to take him away.

The next few hours involve Garrett being treated as a guest, while he waits for the submarine to arrive. The plan is for the submarine to pick him up before dawn. Garrett makes several halfhearted attempts at escape, until finally Maggie reveals that she has taken a set of keys to try to help them escape. She has truly fallen in love with Garrett and is willing to betray Marek. They head down to the shore, where Garrett finds that he cannot identify the correct key to unlock a small motorboat. He finds two life jackets in the boat, and it appears to Marek (watching from the hotel with binoculars) that Garrett and Maggie are attempting to swim to a nearby island with a castle.

Several of Marek's henchmen take the boat and travel to the island. They find the life jackets have been attached to trousers, and that Garrett and Maggie faked the attempt for the island. Marek finds that Maggie and a trouserless Garrett are still at the hotel and calls for his men to return. Unknown to them, Garrett has rigged the alarm on his wristwatch to cause the boat to explode, killing the three henchmen. The submarine sees the explosion and takes off. Marek gives up and leaves the hotel, with Garrett and Maggie toasting their new life together.

== Cast ==
- Ian Carmichael as David Garrett
- Curt Jurgens as Hubert Marek
- Janet Munro as Maggie
- George Pravda as Frank Melnicker
- Kieron Moore as Paul Richter
- Hugh Griffith as Wilkins
- Derek Tansley as Chambers
- Esma Cannon as tea lady
- Cardew Robinson as Constable Pottle
- Kynaston Reeves as Hunter
- Edward Chapman as McPherson
- Frederick Peisley as Cottrell
- John Boxer as secretary at ministry
- Frank Williams as committee man
- Judy Parfitt as chauffeuse
- Tommy Godfrey as drunken party guest (uncredited)
- Lance Percival as dancer (uncredited)

== Production ==
By the early 1960s Ian Carmichael was firmly established in movies as a British comic leading man. However he says "all I was being offered (by the trunkload) were variations on the same old bumbling, accident-prone clot," and was worried that audiences would eventually get tired of him. He wanted to appear in a romantic comedy or a comedy thriller like The Thin Man (1934). He wrote, "I was after the sort of roles that were being played so expertly by Cary Grant: the glossy, middle-of-the-road, domestic comedy at which the Americans excelled, or the superbly turned Hitchcock thriller."

Carmichael was enthusiastic about the script for Hide and Seek written by David Stone. The actor called it "a splendid spy thriller with the most original twists and turns in the plot... Here at last was the gear change that I so badly needed to get me out of the Stanley Windrush mould." He had worked with producer Hal Chester on School for Scoundrels (1960).

Filming took place at Shepperton Studios starting June 1962. According to Carmichael, the script was rewritten during production, which went behind schedule, so many of the later scenes were shot hurriedly. He said "it turned into a chaotic mess, with Chester breathing down the neck of the director, Cy Endfield, and ran weeks over schedules. It was an enormous disappointment for me."

Cy Endfield called it "just a utility picture".

== Reception ==
Carmichael later wrote "very few people saw" the film, adding, "I believe it has appeared occasionally on television, but my big chance to show my paces in a different type of role and ceuvre was torpedoed almost from the outset."

=== Critical reception ===
Variety wrote "what might have been a crisp thriller has misfired. Looseness in script and editing is clearly obvious, so that there is padding in some stages and, at others, important points are glossed over or left absurdly unanswered. Rarely has a thriller petered out in such a scrappy manner. Only very undiscriminating audiences will be satisfied with this pic’s lack of sustained suspense and its too obvious red herrings. Characters are introduced with the minimum of subtlety and key points are tossed away without explanation."

The Monthly Film Bulletin wrote: "A sort of poor man's James Bond exercise, feebly directed in sub-Hitchcock manner. The customary paraphernalia of sinister men in raincoats, thugs in dark glasses, and stern old ladies on trains, is here manipulated flatly and without effect; intriguing possibilities (like the black knight) are started up, then made nothing of; and the dénouement, after a lengthy but unconvincing disquisition from Curt Jurgens explaining how his whole plot was arranged like a chess game, is crammed into about forty seconds flat. Ian Carmichael, overdoing both comic and dramatic effects, makes an unprepossessing hero; most of the minor roles are dully overacted; and even Hugh Griffith, gleefully hamming it up as a modern Noah fleeing the nuclear deluge, fails to make his scenes seem anything other than tiresome irrelevancies designed to bolster a faltering plot."

The New York Times called the film "a pleasantly diverting, terribly British, sometimes contrived melodrama, that is true to its title but hardly the best of this genre to come along."

Filmink argued "Cy Enfield wasn’t a natural director of this material" and Ian Carmichael was "not charismatic enough for this role, and Janet Munro is definitely too hot for him in this movie."

British film critic Leslie Halliwell said: "Too many mysterious happenings with too little explanation sink this comedy-thriller from the start."

The Radio Times Guide to Films gave the film 2/5 stars, writing: "After a decade top-lining some of the wittiest social satires ever made in the UK, lan Carmichael's fortunes were on the wane by the time he starred in this leaden comedy thriller. Director Cy Endfield mishandles the jokier aspects of the plot, in which a scientist working on a top secret project is presumed to have defected when, in actuality, he's been kidnapped."

== Bibliography ==
- Carmichael, Ian (1980). Will the real Ian Carmichael... : an autobiography. Futura Publications.
