= Afternoon of a Nymph =

1962 episode of British TV series Armchair Theatre

- Armchair Theatre episode
- Directed by: Philip Saville
- Teleplay by: Robert Muller
- Original air date: September 30, 1962

Afternoon of a Nymph is an episode of the British Armchair Theatre series made by the ITV franchise holder ABC Weekend TV and first broadcast by the ITV network on 30 September 1962. It was written by Robert Muller and features Janet Munro and Ian Hendry in the lead roles. It was directed by Philip Saville and produced by Sydney Newman.

The production was precorded at a time when plays were typically broadcast live. The script was published.

== Premise ==
A young woman, Elaine, wants to be an actress but struggles against the demands of the profession.

== Cast ==
- Janet Munro as Elaine
- Ian Hendry as David Simpson
- Peter Butterworth as Ronnie Grimble
- Patrick Holt as Rogers
- Jackie Lane as Ginger
- Aubrey Morris as Joe, make-up man
- Jeremy Lloyd as Lord Tony Bright)

== Production ==
Afternoon of a Nymph was Muller's first play. Sydney Newman recalled that Muller, a showbiz columnist, "thought he would like to try his hand at a TV play about the grind of an unknown curvy actress trying to succeed in the cutthroat showbiz world of randy men. I sicced Peter Luke onto Robert and eventually we got a dandy script, which, again, Philip Saville directed most imaginatively. " Muller had interviewed a young Shirley Bassey in November 1958; according to her biographer John L. Williams, who described the interview as "exceptionally revealing" and Afternoon of a Nymph as "a damning account of the exploitation of a starlet", "it’s not hard to imagine that some of the inspiration for the play may have come from this encounter with a clearly troubled young Shirley."

== Reception ==
The second of Muller's seven plays for Armchair Theatre, Mark Duguid writes: "Although it lacks the cynical bite of, say, Alexander Mackendrick's The Sweet Smell of Success (US, 1957), Muller's script convincingly evokes the sordid shallows of showbiz."

A contemporary reviewer, Maurice Wiggins in The Sunday Times described the play negatively as being "a pretentious affair".

Variety wrote the "trouble with the script was that Muller cleverly and sharply drew the background and witty dialog, but he couldn't win much sympathy for Elaine."

Hendry and Munro married in 1963.
