= Norman Warwick =

British cinematographer

- Born: 14 July 1920; London, England
- Died: 26 August 1994 (aged 74); Surrey, England
- Occupation: Cinematographer
- Years active: 1943–1985
- Spouse: Hannah Gordon (m. 1970)
- Children: 2

Norman Warwick, BSC (14 July 1920 – 26 August 1994) was an English cinematographer, best known for his work in the horror film genre.

== Life and career ==
Born in London, Warwick began his career in the camera department of Denham Film Studios in the early 1940s. After years working as a camera operator, he shot his first film, You Can't Escape, in 1956.

Warwick was best known for his work in the horror film genre, including at British horror powerhouses Hammer Films and Amicus Films. He had notable collaborations with directors Freddie Francis and Robert Fuest, among others. In the early 1980s, he shot several episodes of Hammer House of Horror. Outside of the horror genre, Warwick also shot 1971's The Last Valley, notably for being the last film shot on the Todd-AO 70mm stock before the format was revived in 1991. His last cinematography credit was The Doctor and the Devils (1985), directed by Francis.

== Death ==
Francis died in Surrey in 1994.

== Selected filmography ==
- Tons of Trouble (1956)
- You Can't Escape (1956)
- Small Hotel (1957)
- The Young and the Guilty (1958)
- A Lady Mislaid (1958)
- Follow That Horse! (1960)
- The Last Valley (1971)
- Dr Jekyll & Sister Hyde (1971)
- The Abominable Dr. Phibes (1971)
- Tales from the Crypt (1972)
- Confessions of a Window Cleaner (1974)
- Son of Dracula (1974)

== Bibliography ==
- Muir, John Kenneth. Horror Films of the 1970s. McFarland, 2002.
