= The Young and the Guilty =

- Original British quad poster
- Directed by: Peter Cotes
- Written by: Ted Willis
- Produced by: Warwick Ward
- Starring: Phyllis Calvert; Andrew Ray; Edward Chapman; Janet Munro
- Cinematography: Norman Warwick
- Edited by: Seymour Logie
- Music by: Sydney John Kay
- Production company: Warwick Studios
- Distributed by: Associated British-Pathé
- Release date: July 12, 1959
- Running time: 67 minutes
- Country: United Kingdom
- Language: English

The Young and the Guilty is a 1959 British drama film directed by Peter Cotes and starring Phyllis Calvert, Andrew Ray and Edward Chapman. It was written by Ted Willis.

== Premise ==
Parents misconstrue the innocent nature of a teenage romance. When the boy writes the girl a letter, her parents get it and the father assumes they are having sex and forbids her to see him again. His nebbish mother feels bad for him but his working class father less so. He is even amazed his nerdy son had it in him. The boy goes to the girl's bedroom that night to find out if she really does not want to see him anymore and when he finds out she does he is so excited they get caught and her father wants to call the police but his father comes over and he talks to the boy alone until and figures out they did not actually have sex but the love struck boy wanted to and is worried about his feelings. The father tells his son it is natural to have those feelings, but he can control what he does, and they go to talk to the girl and her parents to straighten things out.

== Cast ==
- Phyllis Calvert as Gladys Connor
- Andrew Ray as Eddie Marshall
- Edward Chapman as George Connor
- Janet Munro as Sue Connor
- Campbell Singer as Joe Marshall
- Hilda Fenemore as Maude Marshall
- Jean St. Clair as Mrs. Humbolt, Marshall's neighbour
- Sonia Rees as Brenda, Sue's friend

== Production ==
The film was based on a 1956 television play which author Ted Willis claims was based on a true story he had heard. This starred Andrew Ray and Jill Williams.

Willis later wrote "with this script, for the first time, I did manage to clarify years of anguished thinking about television writing. As I watched the play, and watched the faces of those few friends who saw it with me, I realized the terrifying potential of this intense, intimate, person-to-person hook-up which is television. I understood that it was possible to move that man in the armchair just as deeply as if he were in a theatre or a cinema. If I may be allowed to repeat myself, it was exciting and rather frightening." The Observer called the television production "a real eyeball jerker".

Most of the cast from the television cast repeated their performance in the film with a few exceptions. Janet Munro had not been on the television production. She claims she was cast on the strength of her performance in Small Hotel (1957).

The film's art direction was by Terence Verity.

Munro was later reunited with Ted Willis and Peter Cotes in Bitter Harvest (1963).

== Reception ==
The Monthly Film Bulletin wrote: "The direction (Peter Coles, is by turns cautious, laboured and frankly amateurish: the dialogue is given to repeating rather than developing its points, and the overall production looks cramped, with flat lighting producing an effect of visual monotony. Perhaps the drama might have been more effective with more uniformity of style in the playing. Andrew Ray, though, is over-emphatic for his part, while Janet Munro's performance seems too professionally mature and calculated for conviction. Only Hilda Fenemore and Campbell Singer manage to achieve any depth in their characterisation without unconsciously parodying them. All in all, a well-meaning film which has sadly misfired."

Variety called it "a neat, often absorbing effort" which "may be too sensitive for thoughtless patrons."

In British Sound Films: The Studio Years 1928–1959 David Quinlan rated the film as "average", writing: "Rather strained for effect but is occasionally touching in a naive way."

According to Ted Willis it "became a very respectable movie which, oddly enough, enjoyed huge success in Japan."

== Bibliography ==
- Chibnall, Steve. J. Lee Thompson. Manchester University Press, 2000.
