= Janet Munro =

British actress (1934–1972)

- Born: Janet Neilson Horsburgh; 28 September 1934; Blackpool, Lancashire, England
- Died: 6 December 1972 (aged 38); London, England
- Resting place: Golders Green Crematorium
- Occupation: Actress
- Years active: 1957–1972
- Known for: Swiss Family Robinson; Darby O'Gill and the Little People; Life for Ruth; Third Man on the Mountain; The Day the Earth Caught Fire
- Spouses: Tony Wright (m. 1957; div. 1959) Ian Hendry (m. 1963; div. 1971)
- Children: 2
- Parent(s): Alex Munro; Phyllis Robertshaw

Janet Munro (born Janet Neilson Horsburgh; 28 September 1934 – 6 December 1972) was a British actress. She won a Golden Globe Award for her performance in the film Darby O'Gill and the Little People (1959) and received a BAFTA Film Award nomination for her performance in the film Life for Ruth (1962).

Munro starred in three Disney films: Darby O'Gill and the Little People (1959), Third Man on the Mountain (1959), and Swiss Family Robinson (1960). Her other film credits were roles in The Trollenberg Terror (1958) and The Day the Earth Caught Fire (1961).

Munro married the actor Tony Wright, and then the actor Ian Hendry. She died of a heart attack at age 38. She was described as having "one of the most haunting, magical cinematic presences in the late 1950s and early 1960s… and one of the saddest personal stories."

== Biography ==
=== Early life ===
Born Janet Neilson Horsburgh in Blackpool, Lancashire, in 1934, she was the daughter of Scottish comedian Alex Munro (real name Alexander Neilson Horsburgh) and his wife, Phyllis Robertshaw. She used her father's stage name professionally.

Munro grew up on the road with her father, often appearing with him on stage. Her mother died when Janet was seven, and she was brought up by her father at first. She later recalled "during the war, he was head of entertainment for the RAF, and I went along with him wherever he happened to be. We entertained the troops. I wore kilts and sang. My voice was even smaller than I was, but the boys didn't seem to mind – I was a bit of baggage from home."

She moved to the village of Embsay at age 10 to live with her aunt and uncle for a time. After her father remarried she was brought up by her stepmother and him. She left school and worked in a shoe shop, but her goal was to become an actress. "I never had any doubt as to what I wanted to be", she said later.

=== Early appearances ===
Munro's father wanted her to join him on his act, but she desired to become a legitimate actress. She got a job at a repertory company as a student messenger, and "learned as I went along, playing bits, and by the time I was 17, I was stage manager for the company." She worked in towns such as Preston, Oldham, and Hull, and her wage at the time was around £8 a week.

Munro appeared in a BBC TV adaptation of I Capture the Castle (1954), playing the lead part of Rose. In August 1956 she appeared on stage in the play Daughter of Desire. Variety wrote Munro was "cast as a respectable girl trapped into prostitution. She skillfully conveys the difficult characterization of a youthful femme on the downward path after falling for a plausible type who offers marriage." She says she screen tested for The Rank Organisation, but they turned her down for being "too individual".

She had a small part in the Gordon Harker comedy Small Hotel (1957) and started appearing regularly on British TV shows such as ITV Television Playhouse ("One of Us", "Pickup Girl", "Lace on Her Petticoat") and Armchair Theatre ("Trial by Candlelight", "The Deaf Heart"). Munro could be seen in ingenue parts in the feature films The Trollenberg Terror (1958), a horror film, and The Young and the Guilty (1958), a melodrama written by Ted Willis. According to Filmink she alternated between playing "good girls" and "girls gone bad". She was chosen "Miss English Television of 1958". Despite the efforts of her agent, though, no British studio or producer would put her under long-term contract. "You're an awful long time playing character parts so cash in on juveniles while you can," she said.

=== Disney ===
Munro's big break came in March 1958, when she was cast as the female lead in Disney's Darby O'Gill and the Little People (1959). Although the film was shot in Hollywood, it was cast out of London. Disney saw her in Pick Up Girl, and she was screen-tested over a two-day period. Disney liked her so much, he signed her to a five-year contract. It was non-exclusive, enabling her to make British films.

Disney immediately used her again as the female lead in Third Man on the Mountain (1959) opposite James MacArthur. Contemporary reports compared her with June Allyson.

Munro made her U.S. television debut playing the romantic lead in a TV adaptation of Berkeley Square (1959) for Hallmark Hall of Fame. She was directed by George Schaefer and appeared opposite John Kerr. One review said she did "beautiful work". Variety said she made an "impressive bow".

Munro returned to England to play Tommy Steele's love interest in Tommy the Toreador (1959), then made a third film for Disney, Swiss Family Robinson (1960), again romancing MacArthur. It was shot in the West Indies over five months.

Munro was going to be in Bon Voyage for Disney with Karl Malden, but it was not made for another few years, with Deborah Walley in the role originally announced for Munro. Instead she appeared in The Horsemasters (1961) for him, shot in England for American television and released theatrically in some markets.

Munro returned to U.S. television with Time Remembered (1961) for Hallmark Hall of Fame. Variety praised her performance. Stanley Baker and she were announced to star in an adaptation of the book Marry at Leisure, but it was not made. Munro's contract with Disney ended early - Munro claimed it was her decision, although it reportedly was Disney's, especially after the studio made a star of Hayley Mills.

=== British films ===
Munro was the female lead in the science-fiction film The Day the Earth Caught Fire (1961), one of her best-remembered parts. She made it after her contract with Disney ended.

She had the female lead role in Life for Ruth (1962), directed by Basil Dearden, which earned her a BAFTA nomination for Best Female Actor.

She returned to Armchair Theatre ("Girl in a Bird Cage", "Afternoon of a Nymph" with Ian Hendry whom she was to marry) and was top billed in a film for the first time with Bitter Harvest (1963), but it was not a success.

Munro was the female lead in Hide and Seek (1964) with Ian Carmichael and A Jolly Bad Fellow (1964) with Leo McKern, one of her fellow actors from The Day the Earth Caught Fire. She had a cameo in Daylight Robbery (1964).

=== Return to acting ===
Munro was inactive in her profession for a few years to concentrate on raising a family. She appeared in episodes of Vendetta ("The Running Man") and Thirty-Minute Theatre ("Turn Off If You Know the Ending"), and she had a supporting part in Sebastian (1968).

Munro travelled to New York City to star in a TV adaptation of The Admirable Crichton (1968). She had a cameo in Cry Wolf (1969).

Munro was in ITV Playhouse ("Premiere: Flower Dew"), and had the lead in a series, The Tenant of Wildfell Hall (1969). Reviewing the latter, The Guardian called her "a revelation. She is no longer the B picture girl next door. She is a woman and her acting has power and experience of life."

Her last roles were in Play for Today ("The Piano") and in several episodes of the TV series Adam Smith. In July 1971 she appeared on stage in Look – No Hands.

== Personal life ==
Munro married actor Tony Wright in January 1957. She says she was given away at her wedding by Earl St. John of Rank, and they honeymooned in France, where Wright was making a film. According to Munro, Wright did not like her working and was envious of her success; she left him after getting the contract with Disney. Wright was granted a divorce in 1960, claiming Munro had committed adultery with Gerry O'Hara.

Munro married Ian Hendry in 1963; the couple had two children, Sally and Corrie. They lived in a house on Pharaoh's Island.

Val Guest, who directed Munro in The Day the Earth Caught Fire, later said, "Janet's life was a disaster... [she] didn't become an alcoholic until she met Ian. She tried too hard to keep up with him."

Munro and Hendry were divorced in December 1971. Hendry offered no contest to the charge that the marriage had broken down due to Hendry's "unreasonable behaviour".

== Death ==
Munro died aged 38 on 6 December 1972 on her way to hospital after collapsing at her home in Tufnell Park. Her death was ruled due to a heart attack caused by chronic ischaemic heart disease. She was cremated and interred at the Golders Green Crematorium.

== Filmography ==
Film
Year	Title	Role	Notes
1957	Small Hotel	Effie	
1958	The Trollenberg Terror	Anne Pilgrim	Alternative title: The Crawling Eye (U.S. theatrical release)
1958	The Young and the Guilty	Sue Connor	
1959	Darby O'Gill and the Little People	Katie O'Gill	With Sean Connery
1959	Third Man on the Mountain	Lizbeth Hempel	
1959	Tommy the Toreador	Amanda	
1960	Swiss Family Robinson	Roberta 'Bertie'	
1961	The Day the Earth Caught Fire	Jeannie Craig	
1962	Life for Ruth	Pat Harris	Alternative title: Walk in the Shadow
1963	Bitter Harvest	Jennie Jones	
1964	Hide and Seek	Maggie	
1964	A Jolly Bad Fellow	Delia Brooks	
1964	Daylight Robbery		
1968	Sebastian	Carol Fancy	
1968	Cry Wolf	Polly	
Television
Year	Title	Role	Notes
1957	ITV Television Playhouse	Elizabeth Collins	1 episode
1958–1962	Armchair Theatre	Anne; Elaine	4 episodes, including Afternoon of a Nymph
1957–1968	Hallmark Hall of Fame	Helen Pettigrew; Amanda; Tweeny	3 episodes
1967	Thirty-Minute Theatre	Carol	1 episode
1968–1969	The Tenant of Wildfell Hall	Helen Graham	4 episodes
1971	Play for Today	Mabel	1 episode
1972	Adam Smith	Elizabeth Crichton	5 episodes, (final appearance)

== Select theatre credits ==
- Daughter of Desire (1956)
- Cinderella (1971) - pantomime
- Look No Hands! by Lesley Storm (1971) - directed by Peter Cotes

== Awards and nominations ==
Year	Award	Category	Nominated work	Result
1960	17th Golden Globe Awards	Most Promising Newcomer – Female	Darby O'Gill and the Little People	Won
1963	16th British Academy Film Awards	Best British Actress	Life for Ruth	Nominated
