= The Tenant of Wildfell Hall (1968 TV series) =

- Opening title card
- Genre: Period drama
- Based on: The Tenant of Wildfell Hall by Anne Brontë
- Written by: Christopher Fry
- Directed by: Peter Sasdy
- Starring: Janet Munro; Corin Redgrave; Bryan Marshall
- Country of origin: United Kingdom
- Original language: English
- No. of episodes: 4 (1 missing)

Production
- Executive producer: David Conroy
- Editor: Lennox Phillips
- Running time: 180 minutes (45 minutes each episode)
- Production company: BBC

Original release
- Network: BBC2
- Release: 28 December 1968 – 18 January 1969

The Tenant of Wildfell Hall is the first adaptation of Anne Brontë's 1848 novel of the same name, produced by BBC and directed by Peter Sasdy. The serial stars Janet Munro as Helen Graham, Bryan Marshall as Gilbert Markham and Corin Redgrave as her spoiled and drunkard husband Arthur Huntington. The serial is incomplete, as episode one, "Recluse", is missing from the BBC Archive.

== Plot summary ==
A mysterious young woman arrives with her young son at Wildfell Hall, a nearby old mansion. She is determined to lead an independent existence, but her new neighbors won't leave her alone. They want to reveal her secrets and soon she finds herself the victim of local slander. Only young farmer, Gilbert Markham, is compassionate toward her.

For a full-length summary see: The Tenant of Wildfell Hall plot summary.

== Episodes ==
Episode 1: Recluse.	Release date – 28 December 1968
Episode 2: Marriage.	Release date – 4 January 1969
Episode 3: Revolt.	Release date – 11 January 1969
Episode 4: Pursuit.	Release date – 18 January 1969

== Cast ==
Janet Munro as Helen

- Janet Munro – Helen Graham
- Corin Redgrave – Arthur Huntingdon
- Bryan Marshall – Gilbert Markham
- Jeremy Burring – Arthur Huntingdon the Younger
- William Gaunt – Frederick Lawrence
- Margery Withers – Rachel
- Charles Lamb – Benson
- Megs Jenkins – Mrs. Markham
- Anthony May – Fergus Markham
- Felicity Kendal – Rose Markham
- Suzan Farmer – Eliza Millward
- Jean Anderson – Peggy Maxwell
- John Quentin – Lord Lowborough
- Angela Browne – Lady Annabella Lowborough
- Donald Burton – Ralph Hattersley
- Nicola Davies – Esther Hargrave
- Janet Key – Millicent Hargrave
- Jonathan Newth – Walter Hargrave
- Valerie Van Ost – Miss Myers
