= Bryan Marshall =

British actor (1938–2019)

- Born: 19 May 1938; Battersea, London, England
- Died: 25 June 2019 (aged 81)
- Education: Royal Academy of Dramatic Art
- Occupations: Film and television actor

Bryan Marshall (19 May 1938 – 25 June 2019) was a British actor, with a number of major credits in film and television to his name, in both Britain and Australia.

== Early life ==
Marshall was born in Battersea, south London. He was educated at the Salesian College, Battersea, and trained as an actor at RADA, graduating in 1963, before appearing at the Bristol Old Vic and in repertory theatre and in the 1986 first national tour of The Sound of Music as Captain von Trapp.

== Film ==
Marshall's best-remembered film role is that of Councillor Harris in The Long Good Friday (1980). His other film credits include Rasputin the Mad Monk (1966), Alfie (1966), The Witches (1966), The Viking Queen (1967), Quatermass and the Pit (1967), Mosquito Squadron (1969), I Start Counting (1970), Man in the Wilderness (1971), Because of the Cats (1973), The Tamarind Seed (1974) and The Spy Who Loved Me (1977). His later film career included roles in Australian productions such as BMX Bandits (1983), Bliss (1985), The Man from Snowy River II (1988), The Punisher (1989) with Dolph Lundgren, Country Life (1994) and Selkie (2000).

== Television ==
Marshall had several leading roles on television, notably Dobbin in the 1967 production of Vanity Fair, Gilbert Markham in the 1968 serial of The Tenant of Wildfell Hall and Wentworth in the 1971 adaptation of Persuasion. Other television credits include: Spindoe, Warship, United!, The Forsyte Saga, Dixon of Dock Green, Mission: Impossible, Z-Cars, The Saint, The Avengers, Rooms (1975), The Onedin Line, Out, The Professionals, Return of the Saint, Buccaneer, The Chinese Detective, Robin of Sherwood, Heartbeat, The Bill and Dalziel and Pascoe.

He also worked extensively in Australia, with credits including Prisoner, (Note: Known in his native UK (and the United States) as Prisoner: Cell Block H; not to be confused with the 1967 UK series, The Prisoner.) Special Squad, Golden Pennies, Neighbours, Embassy, Home and Away, Stingers, Water Rats and All Saints.

In 1989, Marshall was the original host of Australia's Most Wanted, an Australian version of the show America's Most Wanted which was focused on helping the police with unsolved crimes.

== Death ==
Marshall died on 25 June 2019, aged 81.

== Filmography ==
=== Film ===
Year	Title	Role	Notes
1964	House of Glass	Private Oliver	TV movie
1966	Rasputin the Mad Monk	Vasily (uncredited)	Feature film
1966	Alfie	Perce (uncredited)	Feature film
1966	The Witches	Tom	Feature film
1967	The Viking Queen	Dominic (uncredited)	Feature film
1967	Quatermass and the Pit (aka Five Million Years to Earth)	Captain Potter	Feature film
1969	Mosquito Squadron	Squadron Leader Neale RAF	Feature film
1970	I Start Counting	George	Feature film
1971	Man in the Wilderness	Potts	Feature film
1973	Because of the Cats	Inspector van der Valk	Feature film
1974	Twelfth Night	Orsino	TV movie
1974	The Tamarind Seed	George MacLeod	Feature film
1977	The Spy Who Loved Me	Commander Talbot	Feature film
1980	The Long Good Friday	Councillor George Harris	Feature film
1981	4D Special Agents	Ray	Feature film
1982	The Merry Wives of Windsor	George Page	TV movie
1982	East Lynne	Orway Bechel	TV movie
1983	BMX Bandits	The Boss	Feature film
1984	The Great Gold Swindle	Detective Sergeant Hancock	TV movie
1985	Bliss	Adrian Clunes	Feature film
1985	Hot Target	Clive Webber, husband	Feature film
1988	The Man from Snowy River II	Hawker	Feature film
1988	Vernon	Forrest	Short film
1989	The Punisher	Dino Moretti	Feature film
1990	The Phantom Horseman	Tremayne (voice)	TV movie
1994	Country Life	Mr. Pettinger	Feature film
1994	Cody: A Family Affair	Roche	TV movie
1996	Chicken	Dwight Serrento	Feature film
1997	Hard Edge	Boss	Feature film
2000	Selkie	Malcolm	Feature film
2000	Ihaka: Blunt Instrument	McGrail	TV movie
2002	Into the Night	Marcus	Short film
2007	Boys Briefs 4 (aka Courts mais GAY: Tome 13)	Marcus	Anthology film, segment: "Into the Night"

=== Television ===
Year	Title	Role	Notes
1963–1968	The Saint	Moreno / Constable Burns	TV series, 2 episodes
1964	Teletale	Guido	TV series, 1 episode
1964	No Hiding Place	Stewart	TV series, 1 episode
1964	Gideon's Way	Braithwaite	TV series, 1 episode
1964	R3	Chris Marks	TV series, 1 episode
1964	Redcap	Private Jedd	TV series, 1 episode
1964–1965	Dr. Finlay's Casebook	Ian Hamilton / Jock Barton	TV series, 2 episodes
1964–1968	Z-Cars	Alf Spicer / Bank Clerk	TV series, 2 episodes
1965–1966	United!	Jack Birkett	TV series, 51 episodes
1967	This Man Craig	Roddy Mackay	TV series, 1 episode
1967	The Forsyte Saga	Harold Blade	TV series, 3 episodes
1967	Sanctuary	Sandy	TV series, 1 episode
1967	Sat'day While Sunday	Jack Marshall	TV series, 2 episodes
1967	The Informer	Briggs	TV series, 1 episode
1967	Vanity Fair	Captain Dobbin	TV miniseries, 5 episodes
1968	Spindoe	Detective Sergeant Peach	TV series, 6 episodes
1968	Softly, Softly	Jeff Simpson	TV series, 1 episode
1968	The Tenant of Wildfell Hall	Gilbert Markham	TV miniseries, 4 episodes
1969	The Avengers	Audrey Phillipson	TV series, episode: "Who Was That Man I Saw You With?"
1969	Strange Report	Inspector Purcell	TV series, 1 episode
1969–1972	ITV Playhouse	Bill / Mark Segal	TV series, 2 episodes
1970	Villette	Dr John Graham Bretton	TV series, 5 episodes
1970	Special Branch	Sullivan	TV series, 1 episode
1970	A Family at War	Stashek	TV series, 1 episode
1971	Persuasion	Captain Frederick Wentworth	TV miniseries, 5 episodes
1971	The Onedin Line	Michael Adams	TV series, 1 episode
1972	New Scotland Yard	PC Derek Tyrell	TV series, 1 episode
1972	The Frighteners	Adrian Wills	TV series, 1 episode
1972	Villains	Arnold Hepton	TV series, 2 episodes
1972	Play for Today	Bill Huntley / Manuel Stocker	TV series, 2 episodes
1972	Dixon of Dock Green	Geoffrey Davies	TV series, 1 episode
1973	Country Matters	Tom Richards	TV series, 1 episode
1973	Menace	Mangham	TV series, 1 episode
1973	Thriller	Dr Brice Nelson	TV series, 1 episode
1973	My Good Woman	Colin Padget	TV series, 1 episode
1973	BBC Play of the Month	Mr Worthy	TV series, 1 episode
1974	Hunters Walk	Billy Silk	TV series, 1 episode
1974	Softly Softly: Task Force	Ronald	TV series, 1 episode
1974	Late Night Theatre	The Fisherman	TV series, 1 episode
1975	2nd House	John Henry 'Babbacombe' Lee	TV series, 1 episode
1975	The Fight Against Slavery	William Knibbe	TV miniseries, 1 episode
1975	Sam and the River	Alan Flint	TV series, 1 episode
1975	Churchill's People	James Ings	TV series, 1 episode
1976	Warship	Commander Alan Douglas Glenn, AFC	TV series, season 3, 1 episode
1974–1976	Rooms	Clive Lawson	TV series, 32 episodes
1977	Piccadilly Circus	Stocker	TV series, 1 episode
1977	The Sunday Drama	Dave Gale	TV series, 1 episode
1977	Crown Court	Harold Phillips / Reverend Howard Davies	TV series, 6 episodes
1978	Horizon	Smeaton	TV series, 1 episode
1978	Out	Hallam	TV miniseries, 3 episodes
1978	The Professionals	Preston	TV series, season 2, episode: “Hunter/Hunted”
1978	Return of the Saint	O'Hara	TV series, 1 episode
1978	Premiere	Mal Leyton	TV series, 1 episode
1979	The Mourning Brooch	Ray Campion	TV series, 3 episodes
1979	The Boy Merlin	Iefan	TV series, 3 episodes
1979	Murder at the Wedding	William Appleyard	TV miniseries, 4 episodes
1980	Airport Chaplain	Jim Halliday	TV series, 1 episode
1980	Armchair Thriller	Paul Marriott	TV series, 4 episodes
1979-1980	Buccaneer	Tony Blair	TV series, 15 episodes
1982	Dick Turpin	Barnaby Husk	TV series, 2 episodes
1982	The Chinese Detective	George Bourne	TV series, 1 episode
1983	Tales of the Unexpected	Frank Jesmond	TV series, 1 episode
1983	A Country Practice	Piet Kooning	TV series, 2 episodes
1983	Cop Shop	Jack Fitzpatrick	TV series, 2 episodes
1984	Prisoner	Dr Jonathon Edmonds	TV series, 8 episodes
1985	Possession	Oliver Hearst	TV series, 6 episodes
1985	The Fast Lane	Kingdom	TV series, 1 episode
1985	Golden Pennies	Luke Greenwood	TV miniseries, 8 episodes
1985	Special Squad	Calvin	TV series, episode 18: "The Chen Legacy"
1986	Robin of Sherwood	Adam Bell	TV series, 1 episode
1987	Neighbours	Gerard Singer	TV series, 3 episodes
1987	Willing and Abel		TV series, 1 episode
1987	Pulaski	Billy Gems	TV series, 1 episode
1988	The Dirtwater Dynasty	Colonel	TV miniseries, 1 episode
1988	True Believers	Richard Casey	TV miniseries, 7 episodes
1988	Act of Betrayal	Kennedy	TV miniseries, 1 episode
1988	The Flying Doctors	Hawkins	TV series, 1 episode
1989	Mission: Impossible	Gregor Antonov	TV series, 1 episode
1989	Australia's Most Wanted	Presenter	TV series, 35 episodes
1989–1992	Tanamera – Lion of Singapore	Chalfont	TV miniseries, 7 episodes
1990	Come in Spinner	Byron	TV miniseries, 4 episodes
1990	Rafferty's Rules	Brian Doyle	TV series, 1 episode
1990–1991	Embassy	Ambassador Duncan Stewart	TV series, 25 episodes
1993	Time Trax	Randall Quinn	TV series, 1 episode
1995	Blue Murder	Task Force Officer	TV miniseries, 1 episode
1996	Water Rats	Inspector Michael Farrell	TV series, 4 episodes
1097	Big Sky	Harry	TV series, 1 episode
1997	The New Adventures of Robin Hood	Bryce the Warden	TV series, 1 episode
1997	Thief Takers	DSI Don Roberts	TV series, 2 episodes
1997	Halifax f.p.	John Halifax, Jane's Father	TV series, 1 episode
1998	Heartbeat	Josh Roberts	TV series, 1 episode
1998; 2003	Home and Away	Trevor Bardwell / John Simpson	TV series, 3 episodes
1999	The Knock	Frankie Johnson	TV series, season 4, 3 episodes
1999	The Bill	Max Weir	TV series, 1 episode
2002	Dalziel and Pascoe	Terry Brakespeare	TV series, episode: "Sins of the Fathers"
2002–2004	All Saints	Gerald Partridge / Miles Gordon	TV series
2004	Stingers	Kepter Vanderbijl	TV series
2012	A Moody Christmas	Cora's Uncle	TV miniseries, 1 episode

== Theatre ==
Year	Title	Role	Notes
1963	The Golden Rivet		Bristol Old Vic – Theatre Royal
1963–1964	The Rivals		Bristol Old Vic – Theatre Royal
1963–1964	The Physicists		Bristol Old Vic – Theatre Royal
1963–1964	Semi-Detached		Bristol Old Vic – Theatre Royal
1964	The Golden Rivet	Malcolm	Phoenix Theatre, London with Linnit and Dunfee Ltd and Murray Macdonald and John Stevens Ltd
1974–1975	Paradise Lost		The Old Vic, London
1976	Liza of Lambeth	Jim Blakeston	Shaftesbury Theatre, London
1978–1979	Love for Love		Bristol Old Vic – Theatre Royal
1980	Lancelot and Guinevere	Lancelot	The Old Vic, London
1980–1981	Aladdin		Bristol Hippodrome
1981	Betrayal	Jerry	Ashcroft Theatre, Croydon, Theatre Royal, Brighton & other locations
1981	The Gentle Trap		Theatre Royal, Newcastle
1982	Season’s Greetings	Neville	Greenwich Theatre, London and Apollo Theatre, London with Michael Codron
1983	Born Yesterday		Comedy Theatre, Melbourne, Her Majesty's Theatre, Sydney with J. C. Williamson
1986	The Sound of Music	Captain von Trapp	Theatre Royal, Plymouth, Theatre Royal, Nottingham, New Theatre, Oxford, Grand Opera House, Belfast & other locations
1991	Australia Felix	Michael Gavan	Stables Theatre, Sydney with Griffin Theatre Company for Sydney Festival
1991	Run for Your Wife		Glen Street Theatre, Sydney with Theatre of Comedy
1992	It's Ralph		Marian Street Theatre, Sydney
2001	Men of Honour		Ensemble Theatre, Sydney
