= Armchair Theatre =

British TV drama series (1956–1974)

- Starring: Harry H. Corbett; Paul Whitsun-Jones; Billie Whitelaw; Neil McCallum; Madge Ryan; Ronald Lewis; Ann Lynn; Paul Curran; Donald Morley; Donald Houston; Peter Sallis; George Baker; Eddie Byrne; Patrick McGoohan
- Country of origin: United Kingdom
- No. of episodes: 426 (258 missing) (list of episodes)

Production
- Production companies: ABC Weekend TV; Thames Television

Original release
- Network: ITV
- Release: 8 July 1956 – 9 July 1974

Related
- Armchair Mystery Theatre; Out of This World; Armchair Cinema; Armchair Thriller

Armchair Theatre is a British television drama anthology series of single plays that ran on the ITV network from 1956 to 1974. It was originally produced by ABC Weekend TV. Its successor Thames Television took over from mid-1968.

The Canadian-born producer Sydney Newman was in charge of Armchair Theatre between September 1958 and December 1962, producing 152 episodes.

== History ==
=== Intent ===
Armchair Theatre filled a Sunday-evening slot on ITV, Britain's only commercial network at the time, in which contemporary dramas were the most common form, though this was not immediately apparent.

The series was launched by Howard Thomas, head of ABC at the time, who argued that "Television drama is not so far removed from television journalism, and the plays which will grip the audience are those that face up to the new issues of the day as well as to the problems as old as civilisation."

The original producer of the series was Dennis Vance, who was in charge for the first two years. In its early years the series drew heavily on North American sources. The first play, The Outsider, was a medical drama adapted from the stage play by Dorothy Brandon, which was transmitted live on 8 July 1956 from ABC's Manchester studios in Didsbury. Reportedly Vance had a preference for classical adaptations, though some of these—such as a version of The Emperor Jones (30 March 1958) by the American dramatist Eugene O'Neill—were not conservative choices. Vance was succeeded by Sydney Newman, who was ABC's Head of Drama from April 1958.

The perils of live transmission caught up with the production team on 28 November 1958, early in Newman's tenure. Whilst Underground was being broadcast, 33-year-old actor Gareth Jones suddenly collapsed and died in between his scenes. Such nightmare situations could be handled more easily when Armchair Theatre was able to benefit from prerecording on videotape, after production of the series moved from Manchester to Teddington Studios near London in the summer of 1959.

Migrating from his native Canada to take up his responsibilities with ABC, Sydney Newman objected to the basis of British television drama at the time he arrived:

"The only legitimate theatre was of the 'anyone for tennis' variety, which, on the whole, presented a condescending view of working-class people. Television dramas were usually adaptations of stage plays, and invariably about upper classes. I said 'Damn the upper classes - they don't even own televisions!'"

He converted Armchair Theatre into a vehicle for the generation of "Angry Young Men" that was emerging after John Osborne's play Look Back in Anger (1956) had become a great success, although older writers such as Ted Willis were not excluded. Willis' 1958 play Hot Summer Night (1 February 1959) was adapted to shift its focus, from an unhappy marriage of parents in the original stage version, onto their daughter's mixed-race relationship with a Jamaican man and the problems they might face if they got married. It was one of the earliest British television plays to have race as a theme.

=== Writers and production staff ===
A script editor, Peter Luke, was the first to become aware of the writers Clive Exton, who contributed eight plays to the series, Alun Owen, who wrote No Trams to Lime Street (18 October 1959),) and Harold Pinter, who contributed A Night Out (24 April 1960).) Owen's play was the first of a trilogy transmitted during 1959 and 1960, which was completed by After the Funeral (3 April 1960) and Lena, O My Lena (26 September 1960).

Ratings for the series were regularly about 15 million with the series frequently in the week's top ten; it was broadcast immediately after the variety show Sunday Night at the London Palladium. Even so, Pinter once estimated that his stage play The Caretaker, enjoying its first run at the time, would have to be performed for thirty years before matching A Night Out's audience of 6,380,000.

The German Jewish dramatist Robert Muller, who had arrived in Britain as a refugee in 1938, contributed seven plays to the series, three being transmitted in 1962 and directed by Philip Saville, including Afternoon of a Nymph. Saville worked on more than forty episodes in the series, while Muller's wife in his later years, the actress Billie Whitelaw, had a part in eleven episodes.

Newman's three-and-a-half-season involvement in Armchair Theatre concluded at the end of December 1962. He was succeeded by Leonard White, an early producer of The Avengers. In Armchair Theatre's last years Lloyd Shirley was the series producer. A holdover from the Newman era, Clive Exton's legal satire The Trial of Dr Fancy (13 September 1964), was among the first television plays on ITV to be suppressed. The deliberately absurd and savage play was a conscious break on Exton's part from the social realism of which he had grown tired. Although the Independent Television Authority (ITA), the regulator of the commercial channel at the time, had not objected to the production, Howard Thomas of ABC feared that it would give offence to viewers. The programme controller at ABC, Brian Tesler, explained the later change of heart: "We believe that the climate of opinion concerning black comedy has changed in the past two years. When the play was recorded we felt that many people might fail to appreciate the compassion which underlies the irony in Mr Exton's play."

Another play from this period was not so lucky. The Blood Knot (recorded 18 May 1963), a two-hander by the South African writer Athol Fugard with apartheid as its theme, was never scheduled.

=== Spin-offs and influence ===
The programme occasionally spun off ideas into full-blown series such as Armchair Mystery Theatre, hosted by Donald Pleasence, which specialised in crime and mystery thrillers. A 1962 adaptation of John Wyndham's short story Dumb Martian, scripted by Clive Exton, was a deliberate showcase for the spin-off science fiction anthology Out of This World. Two 1967 episodes became series. One of these was developed into the sitcom Never Mind the Quality, Feel the Width, while the other, A Magnum for Schneider, became the pilot for the spy series Callan.

After the 1968 ITV franchise changes and ABC's merger into Thames, the programme continued until 1974. Hugely popular at its peak, with audiences occasionally touching twenty million, Armchair Theatre had an important influence on later programmes such as the BBC's The Wednesday Play (1964–70), a series initiated by Sydney Newman after he had moved to the BBC.

Overall, 426 plays were made and broadcast under the Armchair Theatre banner between 1956 and 1974. As with much early British television, not all of the plays from the original ABC series survive in the archives, owing either to live plays not being recorded or to recordings being destroyed. Two later Thames series used the Armchair... prefix: Armchair Cinema, effectively a series of TV movies, and Armchair Thriller (1978–80), which used a serial format.

Armchair Theatre was satirised on the BBC Radio comedy series Round the Horne as Armpit Theatre.

== Reception ==
=== Critical response ===
Jon E. Lewis and Penny Stempel described Armchair Theatre as a "heavyweight player" in Sunday‑night drama, noting its gritty "kitchen‑sink" focus and its directors' ability to produce "movie‑like" work despite live‑broadcast limitations.

== Home media ==
A DVD boxset featuring eight colour episodes from 1970 to 1973 was released by Network DVD in January 2010. It contains the following episodes:

- Say Goodnight to Your Grandma
- Office Party
- Brown Skin Gal, Stay Home and Mind Bay-Bee
- Detective Waiting
- Will Amelia Quint Continue Writing 'A Gnome Called Shorthouse'?
- The Folk Singer
- A Bit of a Lift
- Red Riding Hood

Volume 2, with another eight colour episodes, appeared in 2012:

- Wednesday's Child
- Competition
- The Left Overs
- High Summer
- The Creditors (modernised version of the play by Strindberg)
- The Death of Glory
- The Square of Three
- According to the Rules

Volume 3 contains episodes ranging from 1957 to 1967:

- Now Let Him Go
- The Criminals
- A Night Out
- Lena, O My Lena
- The Man Out There
- The Omega Mystery
- Tune on the Old Tax Fiddle
- Afternoon of a Nymph
- The Snag
- Living Image
- Poor Cherry
- Old Man’s Fancy

Volume 4 contains:

- The Emperor Jones
- The Greatest Man in the World
- The Scent of Fear
- After the Show
- Lord Arthur Savile's Crime
- The Trouble with Our Ivy
- The Hard Knock
- The Paradise Suite
- Long Past Glory
- The Importance of Being Earnest
- I Took My Little World Away
- The Night Before the Morning After

Network subsequently released further episodes under the Armchair Theatre Archive label.

Volume 1:

- Nothing to Pay (1962)
- The Cherry on the Top (1964)
- Light the Blue Touch Paper (1966)
- Edward the Confessor (1969)

Volume 2:

- Worm in the Bud (1959)
- The Invasion (1963)
- The Chocolate Tree (1963)
- What's Wrong With Humpty Dumpty? (1967)

Volume 3:

- The Bird, the Bear, and the Actress (1959)
- The Fishing Match (1962)
- The Man Who Came to Die (1965)
- Dead Silence (1966)

Volume 4:

- The Thought of Tomorrow (1959)
- Toff and Fingers (1960)
- Late Summer (1963)
- The Gong Show (1965)

Armchair Cinema, which included the pilot of the police series The Sweeney (Regan) in its run, was released by Network DVD in autumn 2009.

Studiocanal Vintage Classics' blu-ray release of The Family Way included Honeymoon Postponed (1961) as a bonus feature too.

Network Released ABC Night In volumes several of which include Armchair Theatre episodes. These are A Very Fine Line 9 March 1968; Danger, Men Working 7 May 1961; A Magnum For Schneider 4 Feb 1967; Call Me Daddy 8 April 1967; My Representative 30 Oct 1960 and Sharp At Four 12 Jan 1964.

== See also ==
- Play of the Week
- ITV Playhouse
- Theatre 625
- The Wednesday Play
- Play for Today
- Second City Firsts
- BBC2 Playhouse
- Thirty-Minute Theatre
