= Tzigane (disambiguation) =

Tzigane is a composition by Maurice Ravel.

Tzigane may also refer to:

- Tzigane (novel), a 1935 novel by Eleanor Smith
- Tzigane (TV series), a 1954 Canadian television series
- Tzigane (ballet), a ballet by George Balanchine
- Eugene Tzigane, American conductor
- Tzigane, an alternative name for Romani people
  - Tzigane music, an alternative name for Romani music
