= Red Wagon =

Red Wagon may refer to:

- Red Wagon (novel), a 1930 novel by the British writer Lady Eleanor Smith
- Red Wagon (film), a 1933 British film adaptation directed by Paul L. Stein
