= The Sea Bat =

1930 film

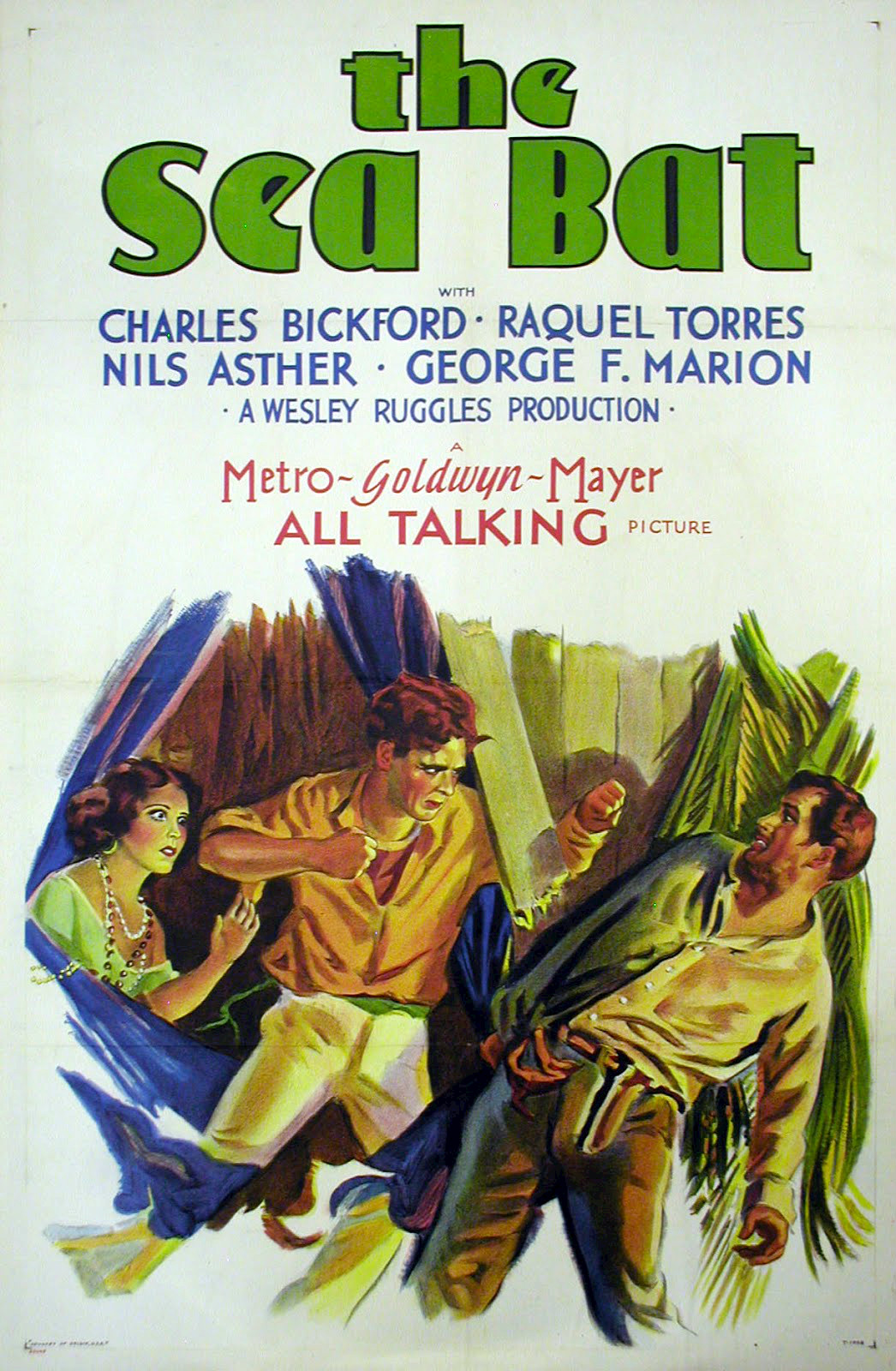
- Film poster
- Directed by: Wesley Ruggles
- Screenplay by: Bess Meredyth; John Howard Lawson
- Story by: Dorothy Yost
- Produced by: Wesley Ruggles
- Starring: Charles Bickford; Raquel Torres; Nils Asther; George F. Marion
- Cinematography: Ira Morgan
- Edited by: Harry Reynolds; Jerome Thoms
- Production company: Metro-Goldwyn-Mayer
- Distributed by: Metro-Goldwyn-Mayer
- Release date: July 5, 1930
- Country: United States
- Language: English

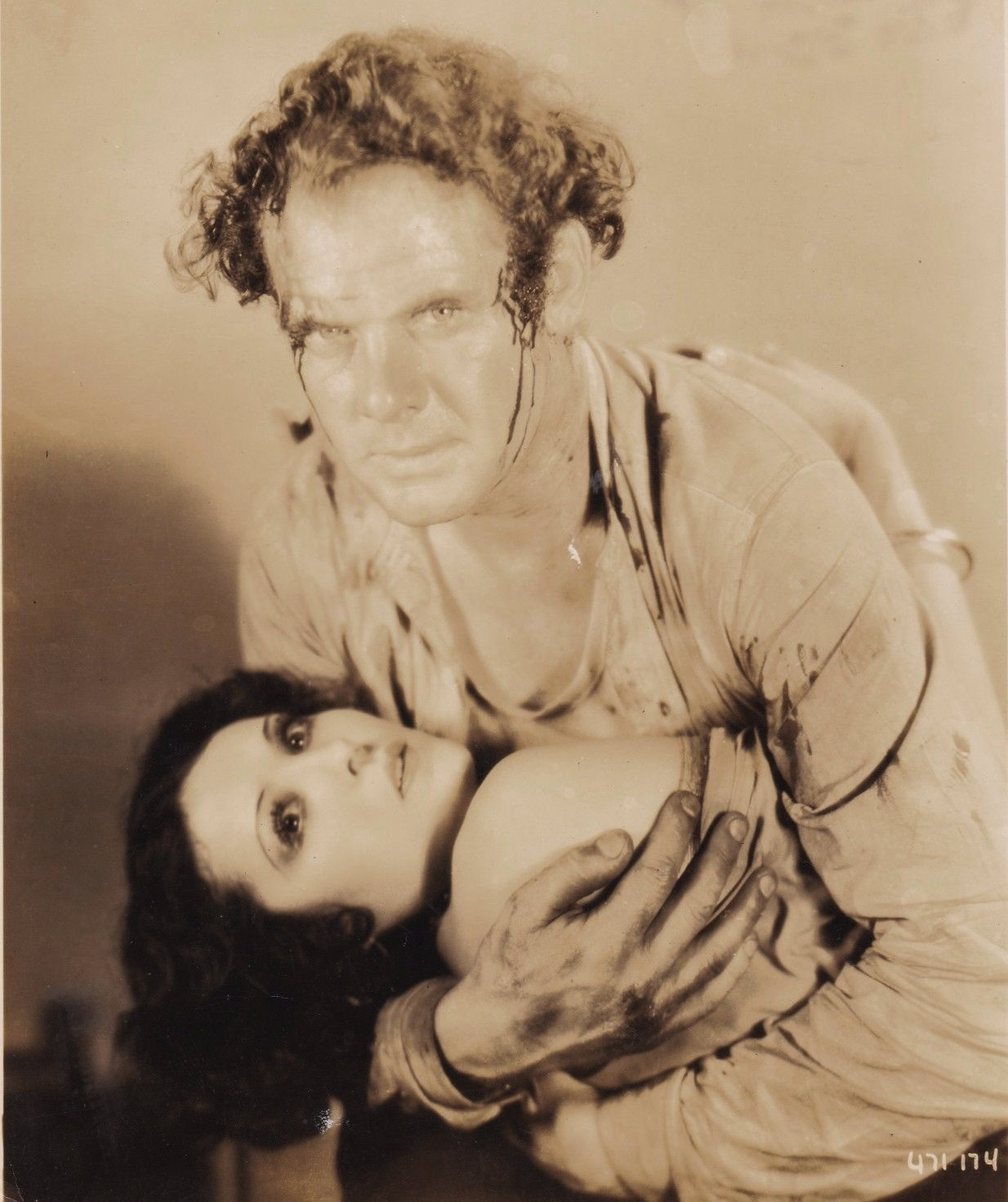
Still with Charles Bickford and Raquel Torres.

The Sea Bat is a 1930 American pre-Code melodrama film directed by Wesley Ruggles, starring Raquel Torres, Charles Bickford. Part of the film was filmed on location in Mazatlán, Mexico. The film was originally intended as a vehicle for Lon Chaney, who was too ill from throat cancer to undertake the project and died a month after the film's release.

== Plot ==
A community of sponge divers are harassed by a large and hostile manta ray.

== Cast ==
- Raquel Torres as Nina
- Charles Bickford as Reverend Sims
- Nils Asther as Carl
- George F. Marion as Antone
- John Miljan as Juan
- Boris Karloff as Corsican
- Gibson Gowland as Limey
- Edmund Breese as Maddocks
- Mathilde Comont as Mimba
- Mack Swain as Dutchy
- James Dime as the sailor

== Production ==
The film was originally announced for filming in early 1929 as a collaboration between Lon Chaney and Tod Browning. By August 31, 1929, Victor Fleming had taken over as the director, but was replaced by Hunt Stromberg by October 2, 1929, and finally by Wesley Ruggles, as of January 20, 1930. Some contemporary reports state that Lionel Barrymore as an additional director, but his name is not mentioned in any trades at the time of the production.

Filming had begun by February 8, 1930, on location at Mazatlan, Mexico.

== Release ==
The Sea Bat was released July 5, 1930. It was released in both sound and silent versions.

== Reception ==
From contemporary reviews, Photoplay declared the film as "Just another talkie, ho-hum!" Variety felt the film started and ended with exciting scenes but that the middle of the film "sags from lack of expected action, especially following the humdinger opening." The Bioscope praised the acting and the scenery as did Harrison's Reports, who praised the sea scenes and battles with the sea bat. Motion Picture News praised the film for its pacing and location shooting.

From retrospective reviews, Michael R. Pitts stated in his book Thrills Untapped that despite scenery and cinematography, the film was slow-paced and "a pale combination of Sadie Thompson (1928) and White Shadows in the South Seas (1928).

== See also ==
- Boris Karloff filmography
- List of monster movies
