= Don Alvarado =

American actor

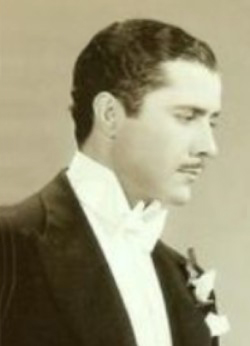
- in I Live For Love (1935)
- Born: José Ray Paige; November 4, 1904; Albuquerque, New Mexico, U.S.
- Died: March 31, 1967 (aged 62); Hollywood, California, U.S.
- Other name: Don Page
- Occupations: Actor, assistant director, production manager
- Years active: 1924–1958
- Spouse: Ann Warner (1924–1932/33; divorced)
- Children: Joy Page

Don Alvarado (born José Ray Paige, November 4, 1904 – March 31, 1967) was an American actor, assistant director and film production manager.

== Life and career ==
Alvarado was born Jose Paige in Albuquerque, New Mexico.

Studio head Jack L. Warner developed a relationship with Alvarado's wife and convinced her to file for divorce using what used to be called a "quickie divorce" conveniently available in Mexico. She did so by August 1932.

Alvarado got his first uncredited silent film part in the 1924 film, Mademoiselle Midnight. With the studio capitalizing on his "Latin Lover" looks, Alvarado was quickly cast in secondary and then leading roles. With the advent of talkies, this all but ended his starring roles. He did, however, manage to work regularly, usually cast in secondary Spanish character roles, such as in the 1929 Thornton Wilder adaptation of The Bridge of San Luis Rey. Alvarado appeared on stage in Dinner At Eight at the Belasco Theatre in Los Angeles in 1933.

In 1939, using the name "Don Page" for screen credit purposes, he began working as an assistant director for Warner Bros. and a few years later as a production manager. In these capacities he was part of the team that made a number of highly successful films including The Treasure of the Sierra Madre (1948), East of Eden and Rebel Without a Cause in 1955, and in 1958 his final film work, The Old Man and the Sea.

=== Death ===
Alvarado died of cancer on March 31, 1967, aged 62, in Hollywood, Los Angeles, California and was interred in the Forest Lawn Memorial Park Cemetery in Hollywood Hills.

For his contributions to the film industry, Alvarado has a motion pictures star on the Hollywood Walk of Fame at 6504 Hollywood Boulevard.

== Filmography ==
- Mademoiselle Midnight (1924) - Dancer at Fiesta (uncredited) (unbilled)
- The Spaniard (1925) - Matador (uncredited)
- The Wife Who Wasn't Wanted (1925) - Theo
- Satan in Sables (1925) - Student
- The Pleasure Buyers (1925) - Tommy Wiswell
- His Jazz Bride (1926)
- The Night Cry (1926) - Pedro
- A Hero of the Big Snows (1926) - Ed Nolan
- The Monkey Talks (1927) - Sam Wick
- The Loves of Carmen (1927) - José
- Breakfast at Sunrise (1927) - Lussan
- Drums of Love (1928) - Count Leonardo de Alvia
- No Other Woman (1928) - Maurice
- The Scarlet Lady (1928) - Prince Nicholas
- The Battle of the Sexes (1928) - Babe Winsor
- Driftwood (1928) - Jim Curtis
- The Apache (1928) - Pierre Dumont
- The Bridge of San Luis Rey (1929) - Manuel
- Rio Rita (1929) - Roberto Ferguson
- The Bad One (1930) - The Spaniard
- Estrellados (1930) - Larry Mitchell
- Captain Thunder (1930) - Juan
- To oneiron tou glyptou (1930)
- Forever Yours (1930)
- Free and Easy (1930)
- Beau Ideal (1931) - Ramon Gonzales
- Reputation (1931)
- Lady with a Past (1932) - Carlos Santiagos
- The Bachelor's Affairs (1932) - Ramon Alvarez
- La Cucuracha (1932)
- The King Murder (1932) - Jose Moreno
- Contraband (1933)
- Black Beauty (1933) - Renaldo
- Morning Glory (1933) - Pepi Velez
- Under Secret Orders (1933) - Don Frederico
- Red Wagon (1933) - Davey Heron
- On Secret Service (1933) - Conte Valenti
- No Sleep on the Deep (1934, Short) - Prince Enrico
- A Demon for Trouble (1934) - Golinda
- Once to Every Bachelor (1934) - Rocco
- Sweet Adeline (1934) - Renaldo (uncredited)
- The Devil is a Woman (1935) - Morenito
- I Live for Love (1935) - Rico Cesaro
- Rosa DeFrancia (1935) - El marqués de Magny
- Rose of the Rancho (1936) - Don Luis Espinosa
- Federal Agent (1936) - Armand Recard
- Rio Grande Romance (1936) - Jack Carter
- Put on the Spot (1936) - Jack Carter (archive footage)
- Nobody's Baby (1937) - Tony Cortez
- The Lady Escapes (1937) - Antonio
- Love Under Fire (1937) - Lieutenant Cabana
- Rose of the Rio Grande (1938) - Don Jose del Torre
- A Trip to Paris (1938) - Gigolo (uncredited)
- Cafe Society (1939) - Don Jose Monterico (uncredited)
- One Night in the Tropics (1940) - Rudolfo
- The Treasure of the Sierra Madre (1948)
- The Big Steal (1949) - Lt. Ruiz
- East of Eden (1955)
- Rebel Without a Cause (1955)
- The Old Man and the Sea (1958) - Waiter (uncredited) (final film role)
