= Christmas tree (disambiguation) =

A Christmas tree is a festive decoration.

Christmas tree may also refer to:

== Biology ==
- Metrosideros excelsa, the pōhutukawa, a New Zealand plant also known as the Christmas tree
- Nuytsia floribunda, a West Australian plant of the genus Nuytsia, also known as the Christmas tree
- Spirobranchus giganteus, a small, tube-building polychaete worm commonly known as the "Christmas tree worm"

== Films ==
- The Christmas Tree (1966 film), a British children's film
- The Christmas Tree (1969 film), a French drama film (L'Arbre de Noël)
- The Christmas Tree, a 1991 American animated TV film
- The Christmas Tree (1996 film), an American drama TV film
- Christmas Trees (film) (Yolki), a 2010 Russian comedy film

== Television ==
- "Christmas Tree" & "The Christmas Tree", two episodes of the TV series Pocoyo

== Literature ==
- Christmas tree emoji (🎄), found in Unicode Miscellaneous Symbols and Pictographs.
- Christmas tree bill, a political term referring to a bill in the U.S. Congress that attracts many, often unrelated, floor amendments
- A Christmas Tree, an 1850 non-fiction narrative by British author Charles Dickens
- "The Christmas Tree", a story featured in The Christmas Tree and Other Stories, an 1863 collection of short stories by British author Ellenor Fenn
- Christmas Tree (short story collection), a 1933 collection of short stories by British author Eleanor Smith
- The Christmas Tree (French: L'arbre de Noël), a 1967 novel by French author Michel Bataille
- The Christmas Tree (novel), a 1981 novel by Irish author Jennifer Johnston
- The Christmas Tree, a 1996 novella by American author Julie Salamon

== Music ==
- "Christmas Tree" (Finnish song) (Joulupuu on rakennettu), a Finnish Christmas carol
- “O Christmas Tree”, the English version of the song “O Tannenbaum”
- "Christmas Tree" (Lady Gaga song), a 2008 single by Lady Gaga and Space Cowboy
- "Christmas Trees", a 2016 song by Major Lazer
- "Christmas Tree" (V song), a 2021 single by V from Our Beloved Summer

== Places ==
- Christmas tree (aviation), a term for alert aprons of the United States Air Force during the Cold War
- Christmas Tree Lane, a boulevard in Altadena, California, USA
- The Christmas Tree Cluster, a distinctive star cluster of the astronomical object NGC 2264 in the constellation Monoceros

== Equipment ==
- Christmas tree (drag racing), the series of lights used to start drag races
- Christmas tree (oil well), an assembly of valves used in oil and gas extraction

== Finance ==
- Ladder (option combination), a combination of three options also known as a Christmas tree
- A combination of six options similar to a butterfly

== Other ==
- Christmas tree formation, a pattern of positions in association football
- Christmas tree packet, a unit of data used in information technology

== See also ==
- Tannenbaum (disambiguation)
