= The Man in Grey =

1943 film by Leslie Arliss

- Film poster
- Directed by: Leslie Arliss
- Written by: Margaret Kennedy; Doreen Montgomery; Leslie Arliss
- Based on: The Man in Grey; 1941 novel by Eleanor Smith
- Produced by: Edward Black
- Starring: Margaret Lockwood; James Mason; Phyllis Calvert; Stewart Granger
- Cinematography: Arthur Crabtree
- Edited by: R. E. Dearing
- Music by: Cedric Mallabey
- Production company: Gainsborough Pictures
- Distributed by: GFD
- Release date: 23 August 1943
- Running time: 116 minutes
- Country: United Kingdom
- Language: English
- Budget: £90,000 or £95,000
- Box office: over £300,000 (UK); 1,138,145 admissions (France)

The Man in Grey is a 1943 British melodrama film made by Gainsborough Pictures; it is considered to be the first of a series of period costume dramas now known as the "Gainsborough melodramas". It was directed by Leslie Arliss and produced by Edward Black from a screenplay by Arliss and Margaret Kennedy that was adapted by Doreen Montgomery from the 1941 novel The Man in Grey by Eleanor Smith. The film's sets were designed by Walter Murton.

The picture stars Margaret Lockwood, Phyllis Calvert, James Mason, Stewart Granger and Martita Hunt. It melds elements of the successful "women's pictures" of the time with distinctive new elements.

== Plot ==
In 1943 London, a Wren, Lady Clarissa Rohan (Phyllis Calvert) and an RAF pilot, Peter Rokeby (Stewart Granger), meet at an auction of the Rohan estate, now being sold off. Making idle conversation, the pilot wonders what the Rohans did to deserve all this wealth. The auction is suddenly paused due to blackout restrictions, and the two agree to return the next day. As they leave, the film flashes back to the early 19th century, and Miss Patchett's finishing school for young ladies. A naive but popular girl, Clarissa (Phyllis Calvert), insists on being friends with a proud, bitter junior teacher, Hesther Shaw (Margaret Lockwood), despite a fortuneteller's warning not to trust women, especially Hesther. Months later, Hesther runs away with a penniless ensign. Miss Patchett forbids the mention of her name by her young charges. Resentfully, Clarissa leaves the school out of loyalty to Hesther. Upon her return home, Clarissa's godmother arranges her marriage to the wealthy Marquess of Rohan (James Mason), a notorious rake who wishes only to have an heir. Thus, the two live separate lives.

One night, Clarissa rushes to a production of Othello in which Hesther plays Desdemona. On the way, her coach is waylaid by a mysterious man, Rokeby (Stewart Granger), who turns out to be the actor playing Othello. He demands a lift to the theater. After the play, Clarissa engages Hesther to be her son's governess. Eventually, Lord Rohan invites Hesther to stay on as Clarissa's companion. Rohan tells Hesther that he knows she abandoned her husband, who later died in Fleet Prison. He admires her ruthless ambition, and they become lovers. At Epsom Downs, Clarissa and Rokeby meet again. They encounter the same fortuneteller who warned Clarissa about Hesther. This time, the prophetess recognizes Rokeby as Clarissa's true love and warns her again about dangerous women. Later, Rokeby confesses his love to Clarissa. They plan to elope to Jamaica, but Rohan confronts them in Vauxhall Gardens, and they fight. The contest, however, is stopped by the Prince Regent (Raymond Lovell).

Rokeby decides it would be wiser to sail to Jamaica alone and summon Clarissa later. She bids him farewell at the port. But once Rokeby has departed, she falls ill and is taken to Rohan's London house. Hesther drugs Clarissa, opens the windows on a storm and damps the fire—ensuring her death. Later, Clarissa's faithful page, Toby, reveals all to Rohan. Though he did not love her, Clarissa was his wife and a Rohan, so he beats Hesther to death with a cane, fulfilling the family motto, "Who Dishonours Us, Dies." Flash-forward to 1943. Peter and Clarissa, descendants of their earlier counterparts, are seen departing the auction, hand in hand. They run to catch a London bus and their future together.

== Cast ==
- Margaret Lockwood ... Hesther
- Phyllis Calvert ... Clarissa (19th century, and present day)
- James Mason ... Lord Rohan
- Stewart Granger ... Rokeby (19th century, and present day)
- Antony Scott (as Harry Scott, in blackface) ... Toby
- Martita Hunt ... Miss Patchett
- Helen Haye ... Lady Rohan
- Beatrice Varley ... Gipsy
- Raymond Lovell ... The Prince Regent
- Nora Swinburne ... Mrs. Fitzherbert

== Original novel ==
The novel was published in 1941. The New York Times thought it was old fashioned but enjoyed the depiction of the era saying it created a "lively scene for a sad story." The book was a best seller in the US, selling more than 100,000 copies in 1942.

It is unclear who suggested the book to Gainsborough – James Mason felt it might have been R.J. Minney but he was unsure. He said the Ostrer brothers were very enthusiastic about it writing " We must concede to them this one victory in the production field ".

== Casting ==
Margaret Lockwood later wrote that when she heard about the project, she read the novel and thought she would be ideal for the role of Clarissa. She was not pleased to be cast as Hesther, writing in her memoirs, "True, I had played that unpleasant little piece in The Stars Look Down after many misgivings. But Hesther was a different matter. She was downright wicked." She says she was persuaded by Carol Reed's advice to not "bother about the number of pages in a part, but think about the motivation." Lockwood "didn't like the motivation – but it was a 'meaty' part."

Lockwood's biographer says Phyllis Calvert originally wanted to play Hesther.

Lockwood says that James Mason's role was originally offered to Eric Portman who turned it down. Her biographer says second choice Robert Donat did not want to make the film and James Mason was the third choice.

To play the role, Mason agreed to make an extra five pictures for Gainsborough (he wound up making only three due to the studio's failure to exercise an option in time for the other two). He later wrote:

My willingness to sign a multiple contract, which is highly distasteful to me, was earnest of my faith in the commercial potential of Lady Eleanor Smith’s novel. There was nothing about it that I could actually bring myself to like, and I had no clue about how I could do anything with a part so monstrously nasty as that of Lord Rohan. I allowed myself to be beaten by the problem at the outset.

Lockwood was the only one of the four leads to be a star when the film was made. She told a journalist at the time:

It is a part Hollywood would have given to a star like Bette Davis. I intend... to 'give it a go.' Its Regency settings are away from the war. It has plenty of emotional, dramatic quality, yet it calls for subtlety. It is a role I can handle well under English direction, for British studios don't concentrate on glamorising stars to such an extent that they become camera-conscious, thinking only of whether they are at the right angle to the camera.

Lockwood said the second male lead was not cast "right up to the day before shooting began... lots of young men had been tried out, all unsuccessfully." Stewart Granger was appearing in a production of Rebecca on stage when he was called in to audition. He says he had been recommended to the producers by Robert Donat, with whom Granger had just appeared on stage in To Dream Again. Granger was the last of the four leads cast and was paid £1,000 for 12 weeks of work. "I'd have played the part for nothing", he later wrote in his memoirs. "It was such a chance."

Lockwood said " As I watched him walk nervously across the set I knew instinctively he [Granger] would get the part.. He was rather an extraordinary young man in those days. He had what seemed to be an enormous inferiority complex, which came out sometimes in a flow of bad language, and at other times in round abuse of everybody, because he hadn't done his piece as well as we wanted."

According to Maurice Carter, the art director Wally Mutton had a confrontation with the studio about the set being ready in time and left the film. Carter took over, although he did not accept credit.

=== Shooting ===
The film was shot in Gainsborough Studios. Phyllis Calvert was pregnant during filming. She later said Leslie Arliss was "not at all" responsible for the eventual success of the film:

He was a lazy director; he had got a wonderful job there and he just sat back... Ted Black was the one who would watch it, cut it, and know exactly what the audience would take. I don't say he wanted to do really good films, but he knew where the money was and he made all those escapist films during the war.

According to Calvert, one time Arliss was late for a scene between Calvert and Granger so they directed themselves, and "Arlissing about" became a "Gainsborough byword for slackness."

James Mason had clashed with Leslie Arliss in a previous film and this tempestuous relationship continued while making Man in Grey. Mason wrote:

We just could not get along with each other. Angered by my inability to cope, I wallowed in a stupidly black mood throughout and since my imagination had contributed nothing to Lord Rohan who appeared on the screen, I have to conclude that only my permanent aggravation gave the character colour and made it some sort of a memorable thing. The extraordinary success of the film made me even more cross since I could claim none of the credit. During this period I was making a bad name for myself, partly because I was a compulsive tease and partly because my experience with producers had made me regard them as natural enemies.

James Mason later described his performance as "atrocious".

According to the newspaper 'The Nashville Banner', many of the furniture used as prop were loaned by Leslie Salts' Gwrych Castle; 'Regency furniture and handsome crystal chandelier from the castle's furnishings were used in the English film.. heavy mahogany doors, a massive gilt chandelier, a unique silver spice carrier and an elaborately carved spicing cabinet are among the interesting oddities and objets d'art on display'

== Reception ==
=== Box office ===
The film was a massive hit in the UK, turning the four lead actors into stars. Phyllis Calvert later recalled it "had two West End premieres. It had one premiere, got terrible notices, went through the provinces and made so much money that it had to come back to London."

It was the seventh most popular movie at the British box office in 1943. According to Kinematograph Weekly, it came after In Which We Serve, Casablanca, The Life and Death of Colonel Blimp, Hello, Frisco, Hello and The Black Swan.

It was the tenth most-seen movie of the year in Australia. The movie was also successful when released in France in 1945 and in Germany.

In 1946 readers of the Daily Mail voted it their second most favourite British film of 1939–45.

Screenonline wrote that it was "easy to see why" the film was so well received:

It caught the national mood quite brilliantly, by fusing elements of previously successful "women's pictures" such as Rebecca (US, d. Alfred Hitchcock, 1940), Gaslight (d. Thorold Dickinson, 1940) and of course Gone with the Wind (US, d. Victor Fleming, 1939) with a surprisingly distinctive formula of its own, blending authentic star appeal (James Mason, Margaret Lockwood, Phyllis Calvert, the then newcomer Stewart Granger) with a plot whose novelettish surface concealed an intricate labyrinth of contrasts and doublings: good against evil, obedience against rebellion, male against female and class against class. The ingredients of virtually all the subsequent Gainsborough melodramas can be seen taking root here.

The movie was one of several films from the Rank organisation released in the United States by Universal. It was not as popular in the United States.

=== Critical ===
The Monthly Film Bulletin called the film " an elaborately produced version of Lady Eleanor Smith's novel, which, while good entertainment, is not outstanding, except in so far as it shows a British studio's competence to make this type of lavish literary production which hitherto only Hollywood has been able to do with consistent success. Acting, settings, camerawork, and direction all reach the highest technical standards."

== Bibliography ==
- Masonfirst= James (1989). Before I forget : autobiography and drawings. Sphere. ISBN 9780722157633.
- Jerry Vermilye The Great British Films, Citadel Press, 1978, pp69–71 ISBN 0-8065-0661-X
- Tims, Hilton (1989). Once a wicked lady : a biography of Margaret Lockwood. W.H. Allen.
