= Lured =

1947 film by Douglas Sirk

- theatrical release poster
- Directed by: Douglas Sirk
- Screenplay by: Leo Rosten
- Story by: Jacques Companéez; Simon Gantillon; Ernest Neuville
- Produced by: James Nasser; Hunt Stromberg
- Starring: George Sanders; Lucille Ball; Charles Coburn; Cedric Hardwicke; Boris Karloff
- Cinematography: William H. Daniels
- Edited by: John M. Foley; James E. Newcom
- Music by: Michel Michelet
- Production company: Hunt Stromberg Productions
- Distributed by: United Artists
- Release date: September 5, 1947 (US)
- Running time: 102 minutes
- Country: United States
- Language: English
- Box office: $700,000

Lured is a 1947 American film noir directed by Douglas Sirk and starring George Sanders, Lucille Ball, Charles Coburn, Sir Cedric Hardwicke, and Boris Karloff. The film is a remake of 1939 French film Pièges directed by Robert Siodmak, which was titled Personal Column in the United States; Personal Column was also the title of this film as originally released. It did not enjoy good business under that name – the Production Code Administration was concerned that some people thought the film was titled "LURID", so United Artists pulled it from distribution, and subsequently re-released it with the alternate title.

The film's sets were designed by the art director Nicolai Remisoff.

== Plot ==
Sandra Carpenter is an American who came to London in order to perform in a show, but is now working as a taxi dancer. She is upset to find out that her friend and fellow dancer, Lucy Barnard, is missing and believed to be the latest victim of the notorious "Poet Killer," who lures victims with personal ads in newspapers, afterwards sending poems to taunt the police. Inspector Harley Temple of Scotland Yard believes the killer to be influenced by the 19th-century French poet Charles Baudelaire. Temple asks if Sandra would be willing to work undercover to help find Lucy and the killer. He sees first-hand how observant she is and gives her a temporary police identification card and a gun (unlikely in 20th century London). Sandra is asked to answer personal ads, watched over by a police bodyguard, H.R. Barrett.

By coincidence, Sandra meets the dashing man-about-town nightclub revue producer Robert Fleming. In the meantime, she answers an ad placed by Charles van Druten, a former fashion designer, who is now mentally imbalanced; Barrett has to come to her rescue. Sandra next needs to be saved, this time by Fleming, from a mysterious figure named Mr. Moryani, who uses promises of opportunity to lure young women into forced slavery in South America.

Fleming shares a stately home with Julian Wilde, his business partner and friend. Fleming ultimately wins Sandra's heart, and they become engaged. Temple thanks Sandra for her efforts and even agrees to come to their engagement party. There, Sandra accidentally discovers incriminating evidence in Fleming's desk, including a distinctive bracelet worn by Lucy. Fleming learns that Sandra was an undercover police agent when he is placed under arrest. Fleming's typewriter is identified as the one used for the poems, although he adamantly denies any involvement in the crimes. Sandra believes him, but Scotland Yard do not. Fleming refuses to see Sandra, believing she only pretended to be in love with him in order to trap him.

Lucy's body is found in the River Thames. Wilde assures Fleming that he will do everything possible to clear his name. It occurs to Temple that it is Wilde who fancies poetry and more likely to be the killer. He confronts Wilde, but has no proof, and learns that Fleming has confessed to the murders. As Wilde prepares to flee the country, he is visited by Sandra. He is secretly obsessed with her, just as he was with the other women he abducted. Wilde at first expresses his desire for Sandra, then removes his scarf and tries to strangle her. Scotland Yard's men, led by Barrett, rescue Sandra just in time. It is then revealed that Fleming's confession was faked, part of a scheme by Sandra and Temple to trap Wilde. Fleming is set free, and he and Sandra make up and toast to better days ahead.

== Cast ==
- George Sanders as Robert Fleming
- Lucille Ball as Sandra Carpenter
- Charles Coburn as Chief Inspector Harley Temple
- Boris Karloff as Charles van Druten
- Sir Cedric Hardwicke as Julian Wilde
- Joseph Calleia as Dr. Nicholas Moryani
- Alan Mowbray as Lyle Maxwell alias Maxim Duval, Moryani's accomplice
- George Zucco as Officer H.R. Barrett
- Robert Coote as detective
- Alan Napier as Inspector Gordon
- Tanis Chandler as Lucy Barnard
- Ethelreda Leopold as blonde nightclub singer (uncredited), voice dubbed by Annette Warren

== Reception ==
Film critic Dennis Schwartz gave the film a mixed review, writing "The flawed film never settles into a dark and sinister mood (filmed in a Hollywood studio) but succeeds only in keeping things tension-free and lighthearted with continuous breezy comical conversations as Ball does a sturdy Nancy Drew turn at sleuthing with her comical detective partner Zucco (who knew the usually typecast villain could be so amusing!). It can't quite measure up to compelling film noir, but it's pleasing and easy to handle despite everything feeling so contrived and confining."
