= Red Wagon (film) =

1933 film

- Directed by: Paul L. Stein
- Written by: Roger Burford; Edward Knoblock; Arthur B. Woods
- Based on: Red Wagon by Eleanor Smith
- Produced by: Walter C. Mycroft
- Starring: Charles Bickford; Anthony Bushell; Greta Nissen; Raquel Torres
- Cinematography: Jack E. Cox
- Edited by: Leslie Norman
- Music by: Kurt Schröder
- Production company: British International Pictures
- Distributed by: Wardour Films
- Release date: 6 December 1933
- Running time: 107 minutes
- Country: United Kingdom
- Language: English

Red Wagon is a 1933 British drama film directed by Paul L. Stein and starring Charles Bickford, Anthony Bushell and Greta Nissen. The screenplay involves a circus owner who falls in love with a lion tamer.

It was made at Elstree Studios by British International Pictures and adapted from the 1930 novel Red Wagon by Lady Eleanor Smith. The film's sets were designed by the art director John Mead.

== Cast ==
- Charles Bickford as Joe Prince
- Anthony Bushell as Toby Griffiths
- Greta Nissen as Zara
- Raquel Torres as Sheba Prince / Starlina
- Don Alvarado as Davey Heron
- Nancy Brown as Lamentina
- Paul Graetz as Max Schultze
- Amy Veness as Petal Schultze
- Jimmy Hanley as Young Joe Prince
- Frank Pettingell as McGinty
- Alexander Field as Harry Cronk
- Francis L. Sullivan as Cranley
- Percy Parsons as Cowboy Joe
- Aubrey Mather as Blewett
- Stella Bonheur as Ella
- Sybil Grove as Mrs. Cronk
- Charles Farrell as Milligan
- Torin Thatcher
- Hay Petrie
- Helen Ferrers
- Arthur Goullet

== Bibliography ==
- Low, Rachael. Filmmaking in 1930s Britain. George Allen & Unwin, 1985.
- Wood, Linda. British Films, 1927-1939. British Film Institute, 1986.
