= The Desert Rider =

1929 film

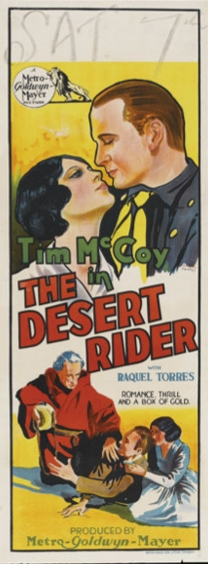
- Movie poster
- Directed by: Nick Grinde
- Screenplay by: Harry Sinclair Drago; Oliver Drake
- Story by: Milton H. Bren; Ted Shane
- Starring: Tim McCoy; Raquel Torres; Bert Roach; Edward Connelly; Harry Woods; Jess Cavin
- Cinematography: Arthur Reed
- Edited by: William LeVanway
- Production company: Metro-Goldwyn-Mayer
- Distributed by: Metro-Goldwyn-Mayer
- Release date: May 11, 1929
- Running time: 60 minutes
- Country: United States
- Languages: Silent; English intertitles

The Desert Rider is a 1929 American silent Western film directed by Nick Grinde and written by Harry Sinclair Drago and Oliver Drake. The film stars Tim McCoy, Raquel Torres, Bert Roach, Edward Connelly, Harry Woods and Jess Cavin. The film was released on May 11, 1929, by Metro-Goldwyn-Mayer.

== Cast ==
- Tim McCoy as Jed Tyler
- Raquel Torres as Dolores Alvarado
- Bert Roach as Friar Bernardo
- Edward Connelly as Padre Quintada
- Harry Woods as Williams
- Jess Cavin as Black Bailey
