= Henry Furneaux =

British classical scholar (1829–1900)

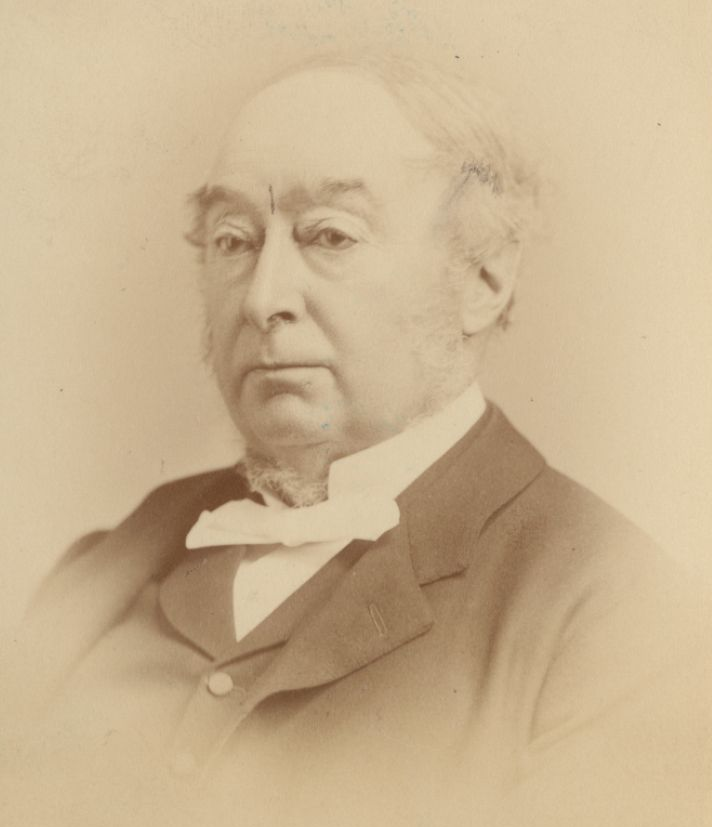
- Born: 26 June 1829; St. Germans, Cornwall
- Died: 7 January 1900 (aged 70)
- Occupation: Classical scholar
- Known for: Annotated editions of Tacitus

Henry Furneaux (26 June 1829 – 7 January 1900) was a British classical scholar at the University of Oxford, specialising in the writings of the Roman historian Tacitus.

== Biography ==
Furneaux was born in 1829 in St Germans, Cornwall, England, where his father, Rev. Tobias Furneaux, was vicar for almost fifty years. During his education in Winchester College he was noted for his excellent memory, and from there he gained a scholarship to Corpus Christi College, Oxford, where he read Classics and was awarded a first class in 1851. He went on to become Fellow and tutor of Corpus Christi College, and was ordained and became moderator in 1856, then became proctor in 1865, and was examiner in Literae Humaniores from 1871 to 1876. From 1868 to 1893 he was Rector of Lower Heyford in Oxfordshire, and after resigning in 1893 he lived in Oxford.

On 25 May 1870 he married Eleanor Elizabeth Severn, the youngest daughter of the artist Joseph Severn, and twin of artist Arthur Severn. They had two sons and three daughters, including Margaret Eleanor Furneaux who married F. E. Smith, 1st Earl of Birkenhead in 1901. His grandchildren were Frederick Smith, 2nd Earl of Birkenhead, and Lady Eleanor Smith and Lady Pamela Smith, members of the Bright Young Things.

Furneaux died from "failure of action of the heart" on 7 January 1900.

== Works ==
Furneaux is best known for his special study of the writings of the Roman historian Tacitus, and his editions of the Annals, the Germania and the Agricola remained unsurpassed for many years. His works include:

- Furneaux, Henry, ed. (1896). Cornelii Taciti – Annalium Ab Excessu Divi Augusti Libri [The Annals of Tacitus] (Open Library ebook) (2nd ed.). Oxford: Clarendon Press.
- Furneaux, Henry, ed. (1898). Cornelii Taciti – Vita Agricolae (Open Library ebook). Oxford: Clarendon Press.
- Furneaux, Henry, ed. (1894). Cornelii Taciti – De Germania (Open Library ebook). Oxford: Clarendon Press.

== Personal ==
His obituary in The Times concludes, "His cheerful, kindly company, his sound scholarship, his unostentatious but profoundly appreciated virtues, will be for long sorely missed in the life of the University."
