= Satan's Circus (book) =

- First edition (US)
- Author: Eleanor Smith
- Language: English
- Genre: Short stories
- Publisher: Gollancz (Britain); Bobbs Merrill (US)
- Publication date: 1932
- Publication place: United Kingdom
- Media type: Print

Satan's Circus is a 1932 collection of short stories with a supernatural theme by the British writer Eleanor Smith, several of which have been included in anthologies over the years.

== Bibliography ==
- Vinson, James. Twentieth-Century Romance and Gothic Writers. Macmillan, 1982.
