= The Men in Her Life =

1941 film by Gregory Ratoff

- Theatrical release poster
- Directed by: Gregory Ratoff
- Screenplay by: Frederick Kohner; Michael Wilson; Paul Trivers
- Based on: Ballerina by Lady Eleanor Smith
- Produced by: Gregory Ratoff
- Starring: Loretta Young; Conrad Veidt; Dean Jagger; John Shepperd; Otto Kruger; Eugenie Leontovich
- Cinematography: Harry Stradling; Arthur Miller
- Edited by: Francis D. Lyon
- Music by: David Raksin
- Production company: Gregory Ratoff Productions
- Distributed by: Columbia Pictures
- Release date: October 30, 1941
- Running time: 89 minutes
- Country: United States
- Language: English

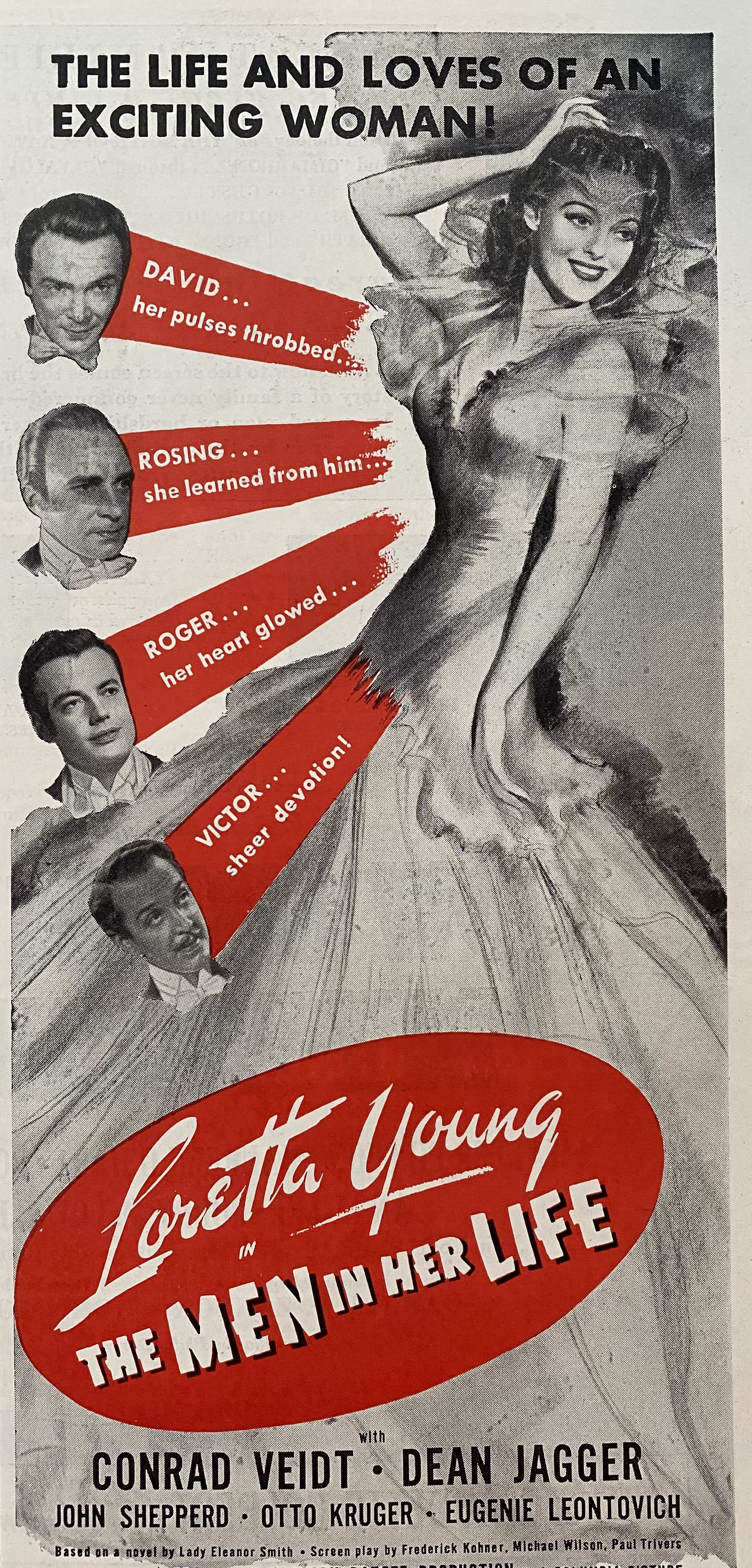
A 1942 advertisement for "The Men in Her Life" (Photoplay magazine).

The Men in Her Life is a 1941 American period drama film directed by Gregory Ratoff and starring Loretta Young, Conrad Veidt, Dean Jagger, John Shepperd, Otto Kruger and Eugenie Leontovich. It is an adaptation of the 1932 novel Ballerina by the British writer Eleanor Smith. It was nominated for the 1941 Academy Award for Best Sound Recording (John P. Livadary), but lost to That Hamilton Woman. The sets were designed by the Russian-born art director Nicolai Remisoff.

== Plot ==
A nineteenth-century circus performer becomes a celebrated dancer, but has trouble balancing her romantic and family aspirations with her career.

== Cast ==
- Loretta Young as Lina Varsavina
- Conrad Veidt as Stanislas Rosing
- Dean Jagger as David Gibson
- Eugenie Leontovich as Marie
- John Shepperd as Roger Chevis
- Otto Kruger as Victor
- Paul Baratoff as Manilov
- Ann Todd as Rose
- Billy Rayes as Nurdo
- Ludmila Toretzka as Madame Olenkova
- Tom Ladd as Lina's Dancing Partner

=== Uncredited ===
- John Elliott as Andrew, Gibson's Butler
- Holmes Herbert as Second Doctor
- Edward Van Sloan as First Doctor

== Bibliography ==
- McLean, Adrienne L. Dying Swans and Madmen: Ballet, the Body, and Narrative Cinema. Rutgers University Press, 2008.
