= Lovers' Meeting =

1940 novel by Eleanor Smith

- First edition (UK)
- Author: Eleanor Smith
- Language: English
- Genre: Drama
- Publisher: Hutchinson (Britain); Doubleday (US)
- Publication date: 1940
- Publication place: United Kingdom
- Media type: Print

Lovers' Meeting is a 1940 novel by the British writer Eleanor Smith. Its historical setting and time travelling drew comparisons to Henry James' novel The Sense of the Past and its stage version Berkeley Square. Set in 1812 during the Regency era, it Smith's only novel to venture into fantasy. Before her death in 1945, Smith brought an injunction against Ealing Studios claiming that their new film of the same title was an attempt to capitalise on her unconnected novel. It was subsequently retitled as The Captive Heart on its release.

== Bibliography ==
- Pringle, David. St. James Guide to Horror, Ghost & Gothic Writers. St. James Press, 1998.
- Vinson, James. Twentieth-Century Romance and Gothic Writers. Macmillan, 1982.
