= Magic Lantern (novel) =

Novel by Lady Eleanor Smith

- First edition (UK)
- Author: Eleanor Smith
- Language: English
- Genre: Historical romance
- Publisher: Hutchinson (UK); Doubleday (US)
- Publication date: 1944
- Publication place: United Kingdom
- Media type: Print

Magic Lantern is a 1944 historical novel by Lady Eleanor Smith, her final novel before her death the next year. In it a Devon squire marries an attractive gypsy girl with whom he has a son; he in turn becomes besotted with a gypsy woman on the moors.

== Bibliography ==
- Vinson, James. Twentieth-Century Romance and Gothic Writers. Macmillan, 1982.
