= Ballerina (novel) =

1932 novel by Eleanor Smith

- First US edition
- Author: Eleanor Smith
- Language: English
- Genre: Drama
- Publisher: Gollancz (Britain); Bobbs-Merrill (US)
- Publication date: 1932
- Publication place: United Kingdom
- Media type: Print

Ballerina is a 1932 novel by the British writer Eleanor Smith. It portrays the life of a great ballerina, and her eventual fall.

== Adaptation ==
It was adapted into the 1941 Hollywood film The Men in Her Life directed by Gregory Ratoff and starring Loretta Young and Conrad Veidt.

== Bibliography ==
- Goble, Alan. The Complete Index to Literary Sources in Film. Walter de Gruyter, 1999.
- Vinson, James. Twentieth-Century Romance and Gothic Writers. Macmillan, 1982.
