= Nikolai Remizov =

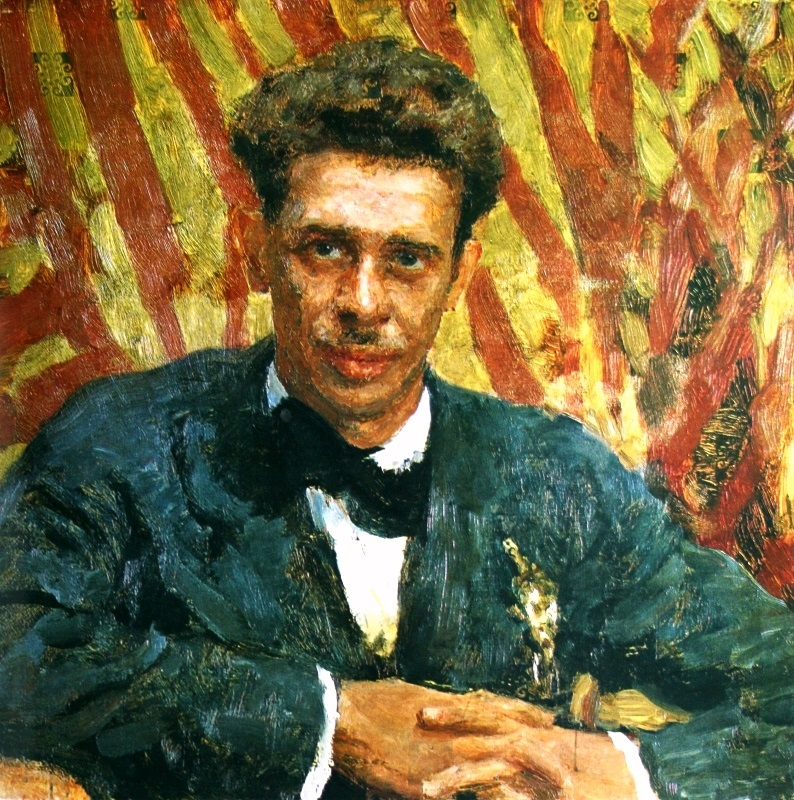
- Portrait of Remizov by Ilya Repin.
- Born: May 20, 1887; St. Petersburg, Russian Empire
- Died: August 4, 1975 (aged 88); Riverside County, California, United States
- Other names: Re-Mi, Nicolai Remisoff
- Occupations: Artist, cartoonist, art director
- Years active: 1908–1939 (cartoonist), 1939–1960 (film)

Nikolai Vladimirovich Remizov (Russian: Никола́й Влади́мирович Ре́мизов; 20 May [O.S. 8 May] 1887 in Saint-Petersburg – 4 August 1975 in Riverside County), also known as Nicolai Remisoff, was a Russian and American artist, political cartoonist and art director of American cinema. He worked a number of times on films directed by fellow Russian Gregory Ratoff. Before the 1917 Revolution he was the leading artist in Russian satirical magazines Strekoza and Satirikon, in which he published his cartoons under the pseudonym Re-Mi.

== Selected filmography ==
- Of Mice and Men (1939)
- Captain Caution (1940)
- Turnabout (1940)
- My Life with Caroline (1941)
- The Men in Her Life (1941)
- Broadway Limited (1941)
- Topper Returns (1941)
- The Corsican Brothers (1941)
- Something to Shout About (1943)
- The Heat's On (1943)
- Guest in the House (1944)
- Madame Pimpernel (1945)
- Young Widow (1946)
- The Strange Woman (1946)
- Dishonored Lady (1947)
- Lured (1947)
- No Minor Vices (1948)
- When I Grow Up (1951)
- The Moon Is Blue (1953)
- Please Murder Me (1956)
- Johnny Concho (1956)
- Pawnee (1957)
- Undersea Girl (1957)
- Black Patch (1957)
- Pork Chop Hill (1959)
- Ocean's 11 (1960)

== Bibliography ==
- Mary Lackritz Gray & Franz Schulze. A Guide to Chicago's Murals. University of Chicago Press, 2001.
- Joseph R. Millichap. Lewis Milestone. Twayne Publishers, 1981.
