= The Bridge of San Luis Rey (1929 film) =

1929 film

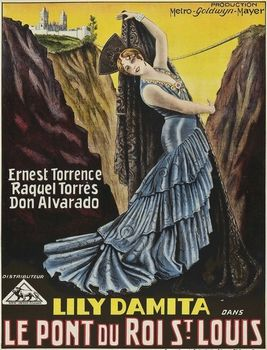
- Directed by: Charles Brabin
- Written by: Marian Ainslee; Ruth Cummings; Alice D. G. Miller; Thornton Wilder (novel)
- Produced by: Hunt Stromberg
- Starring: Lili Damita; Duncan Renaldo; Raquel Torres
- Cinematography: Merritt B. Gerstad
- Edited by: Margaret Booth
- Music by: Carli Elinor; Peter Brunelli (uncredited)
- Production company: Metro-Goldwyn-Mayer
- Distributed by: Metro-Goldwyn-Mayer
- Release date: March 30, 1929
- Running time: 86 minutes
- Country: United States
- Languages: Sound (Part-talkie); English intertitles

The Bridge of San Luis Rey is a 1929 American sound part-talkie film released by Metro-Goldwyn-Mayer. The film was directed by Charles Brabin and starred Lili Damita and Don Alvarado. In addition to sequences with audible dialogue or talking sequences, the film features a synchronized musical score and sound effects along with English intertitles. The sound was recorded via the Western Electric sound-on-film process.

The film closely follows the bestselling 1927 Thornton Wilder novel of the same name and won the second Academy Award for Best Art Direction.

== Cast ==
- Lili Damita as Camila (La Perichole)
- Ernest Torrence as Uncle Pio
- Raquel Torres as Pepita
- Don Alvarado as Manuel
- Duncan Renaldo as Esteban
- Henry B. Walthall as Father Juniper
- Michael Vavitch as Viceroy
- Emily Fitzroy as Marquesa
- Jane Winton as Doña Carla
- Gordon Thorpe as Jaime
- Mitchell Lewis as Capt. Alvarado
- Paul Ellis as Don Vicente
- Eugenie Besserer as A nun
- Tully Marshall as A townsman

== Background and production ==
The film and novel are very loosely based on the real-life story of Micaela Villegas (1748–1819), a famous Peruvian entertainer known as La Perichole. Her life was also the inspiration for the novella Le Carrosse du Saint-Sacrement by Prosper Mérimée; the opéra bouffe La Périchole by Jacques Offenbach; and Jean Renoir’s 1953 film Le Carrosse d'or (The Golden Coach).

== Preservation ==
The complete soundtrack for this film survives on Vitaphone type discs. A mute print of the film exists at the George Eastman Museum film archive.

== Remakes ==
The film was remade in 1944 with Lynn Bari, and once more in 2004, starring F. Murray Abraham, Gabriel Byrne, Robert De Niro, Kathy Bates, and Pilar López de Ayala.

== See also ==
- List of early sound feature films (1926–1929)
