= Driftwood (1928 film) =

1928 film by Christy Cabanne

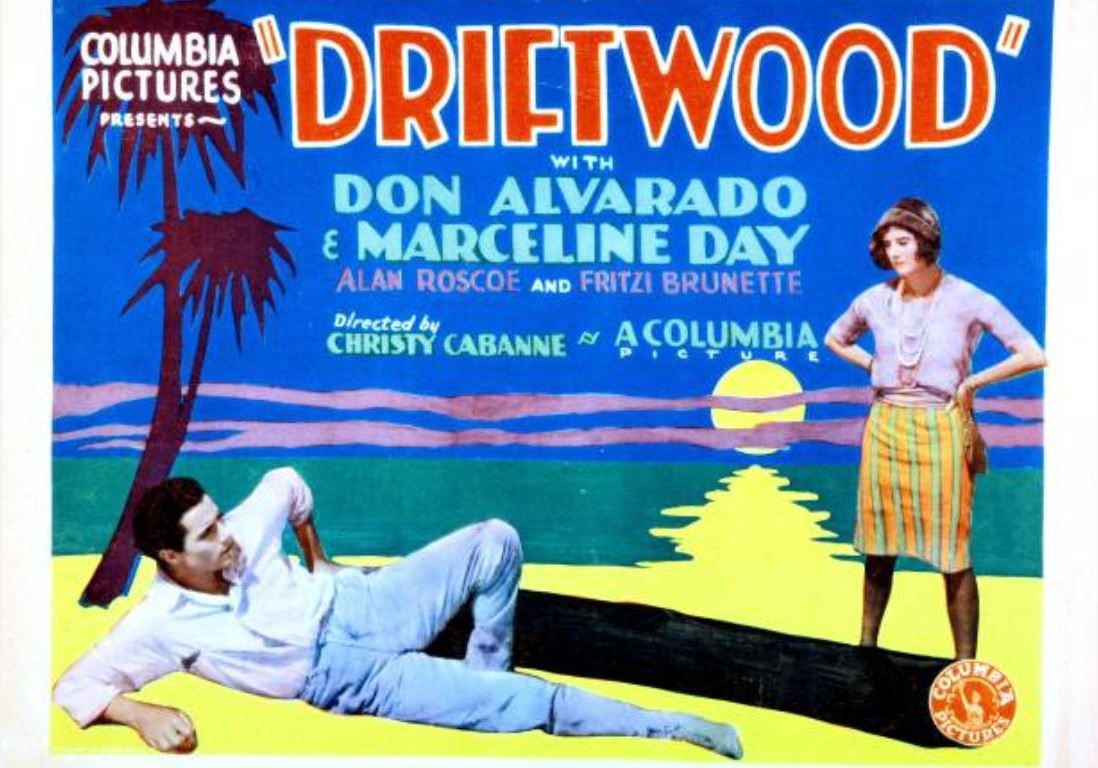
- Theatrical poster
- Directed by: Christy Cabanne
- Written by: Mort Blumenstock; Richard Harding Davis; Lillie Hayward
- Starring: Don Alvarado; Marceline Day; Alan Roscoe
- Cinematography: Joseph Walker
- Edited by: Ben Pivar
- Production company: Columbia Pictures
- Distributed by: Columbia Pictures
- Release date: October 15, 1928
- Running time: 65 minutes
- Country: United States
- Language: English

Driftwood is a lost 1928 American silent drama film directed by Christy Cabanne and starring Don Alvarado, Marceline Day and Alan Roscoe.

== Cast ==
- Don Alvarado as Jim Curtis
- Marceline Day as Daisy Smith
- Alan Roscoe as Johnson
- Jack W. Johnston as Barlow
- Fred Holmes as Doc Prouty
- Fritzi Brunette as Lola
- Nora Cecil as Mrs. Prouty
- Joseph P. Mack as Johnson's Henchman

== Bibliography ==
- Monaco, James. The Encyclopedia of Film. Perigee Books, 1991.
