= The Spanish House (novel) =

1938 novel by Eleanor Smith

- First edition (UK)
- Author: Eleanor Smith
- Language: English
- Genre: Drama
- Publisher: Hutchinson (UK); Doubleday (US)
- Publication date: 1938
- Publication place: United Kingdom
- Media type: Print

The Spanish House is a 1938 novel by the British writer Eleanor Smith.

== Bibliography ==
- Vinson, James. Twentieth-Century Romance and Gothic Writers. Macmillan, 1982.
