= Red Wagon (novel) =

1930 novel by Lady Eleanor Smith

- First edition (US)
- Author: Eleanor Smith
- Language: English
- Publication date: 1930

Red Wagon is a 1930 novel by the British writer Lady Eleanor Smith. It is set in a circus company where the owner becomes involved in a love triangle with a lion tamer and a gypsy girl while the circus tours Continental Europe. It was first published by Victor Gollancz in the UK and by Bobbs-Merrill in the US.

== Film adaptation ==
In 1933 the story was made into a film by British International Pictures. It was directed by Paul L. Stein and starred Charles Bickford, Raquel Torres, Greta Nissen and Anthony Bushell.

== Bibliography ==
- Bergfelder, Tim & Cargnelli, Christian. Destination London: German-speaking emigrés and British cinema, 1925-1950. Berghahn Books, 2008.
