= Portrait of a Lady (novel) =

1936 novel by Eleanor Smith

- First edition (UK)
- Author: Eleanor Smith
- Language: English
- Genre: Historical drama
- Publisher: Hutchinson (UK); Doubleday (US)
- Publication date: 1936
- Publication place: United Kingdom
- Media type: Print

Portrait of a Lady is a 1936 historical novel by the British writer Eleanor Smith. In the Victorian era a married woman is attracted by a young gypsy, but eventually manages to resist him.

== Bibliography ==
- Vinson, James. Twentieth-Century Romance and Gothic Writers. Macmillan, 1982.
