= Estrellados =

1930 film by Salvador de Alberich and Edward Sedgwick

- Directed by: Salvador de Alberich; Edward Sedgwick
- Screenplay by: Salvador de Alberich; Paul Dickey; Richard Schayer
- Produced by: Buster Keaton
- Starring: Buster Keaton; Raquel Torres; Don Alvarado; María Calvo; Juan de Homs; Carlos Villarías
- Cinematography: Leonard Smith
- Edited by: George Boemler
- Production company: Metro-Goldwyn-Mayer
- Distributed by: Metro-Goldwyn-Mayer
- Release date: July 7, 1930
- Running time: 96 minutes
- Country: United States
- Language: Spanish

Estrellados is a 1930 American pre-Code comedy film directed by Salvador de Alberich and Edward Sedgwick, and written by Salvador de Alberich, Paul Dickey and Richard Schayer. The film stars Buster Keaton, Raquel Torres, Don Alvarado, María Calvo, Juan de Homs and Carlos Villarías.

The film was released on July 7, 1930, by Metro-Goldwyn-Mayer. The film serves as the Spanish-language version of Free and Easy.

== Plot ==
Estrellados (1930)

== Cast ==
- Buster Keaton as Canuto Cuadratin
- Raquel Torres as Elvira Rosas
- Don Alvarado as Larry Mitchell
- María Calvo as La Mamà Rosas
- Juan de Homs as Director
- Carlos Villarías as Jack Collier
- Lionel Barrymore as himself
- William Haines as himself
- John Miljan as himself
- Gwen Lee as herself
- Cecil B. DeMille as himself
- Fred Niblo as himself
