= Lady Eleanor Smith =

English writer (1902–1945)

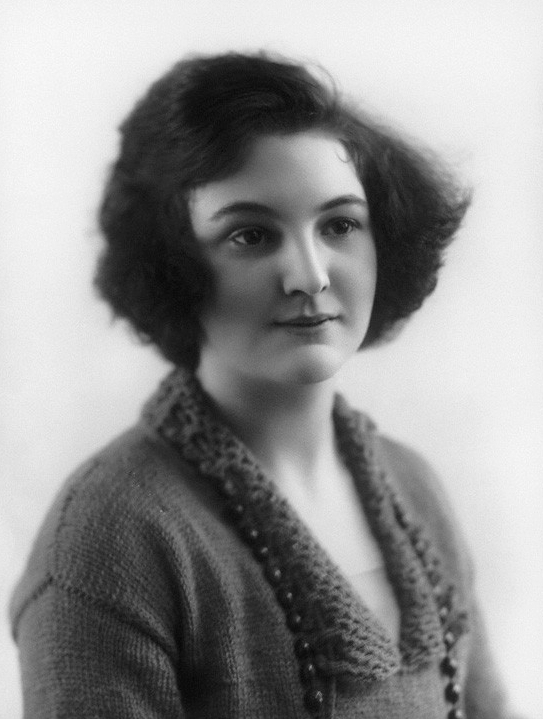
- Lady Eleanor Furneaux Smith (1920), from the National Portrait Gallery, London
- Born: Eleanor Furneaux Smith; 7 August 1902; Birkenhead, Cheshire, England
- Died: 20 October 1945 (aged 43); Westminster, London, England
- Occupation: Writer
- Parent(s): F. E. Smith, 1st Earl of Birkenhead; Margaret Furneaux
- Relatives: Henry Furneaux (maternal grandfather)
- Writing career
- Genres: Short story; romantic fiction; historical fiction; horror; ghost story; journalism

Lady Eleanor Furneaux Smith (7 August 1902 – 20 October 1945) was an English writer and active member of the Bright Young Things.

== Life ==
Born in Birkenhead, England in 1902, Smith was the eldest of the politician F. E. Smith's three children; her mother was Margaret Furneaux, daughter of the academic Henry Furneaux. Eleanor Smith was great-granddaughter of Joseph Severn on her mother's side, the Devonshire Furneaux, a Norman family. Her brother was Frederick Smith, 2nd Earl of Birkenhead, and her sister Lady Pamela married Hon. Michael Berry. Her father was created Earl of Birkenhead in 1922.

She went to Miss Douglas's Queen's Gate School. At Queen's Gate she met Lady Allanah Harper, Zita Jungman, and Teresa "Baby" Jungman and together they became early members of what the British press would call the "Bright Young Things", a nickname given by the tabloid press to a group of bohemian young aristocrats and socialites in 1920s London.

As a young girl, she spent time among her father's friends and fellow politicians and their children, including the Churchills, Guests, Grenfells, Duffs, and many others. This influenced Smith to become a life-long supporter of the Conservative Party.

Smith's paternal great-grandmother, Bathsheba, was said to have been a Gypsy, and this sparked an early fascination with local Romani people, but she credits a book called Lavengro as being one of the greatest influences of her life-long fascination with Gypsies and their culture. She went so far as to learn to read and speak the Romani language, which she called "musical and broken."

When she was living in London, Smith had an encounter with Daniel "Kid Spider" Rosenthal, where he called her from his hotel asking her to meet him for lunch to discuss business. Mistaking him for a "film man", she agreed, but this was untrue and he later went to her home and threatened to kill her, and harassed her with marriage proposals until she went to Scotland Yard. They informed her that he was wanted for the murder of his father.

Smith travelled extensively throughout her life, and she was arrested twice, once in Romania for having her career listed as "journalist" on her passport, and once in Rome for walking around in a sleeveless dress.

In 1953, after Smith's death, Frederick Smith, her brother and 2nd Earl of Birkenhead—with whom she was very close—published a memoir about her life.

== Career ==
Eleanor Smith began her journalist career writing society gossip columns for various newspapers, and she wrote a gossip column and film critique column for a Sunday paper on Fleet Street for three years. She quit this job after she was approached by Frederick Martin about a job writing for the newly-formed Great Carmo Circus. She travelled with the Great Carmo Circus for many years, and it is here that she began to write her first novel, Red Wagon.

Eleanor Smith worked as a society reporter and cinema reviewer for some time, then as a publicist for various circus companies. In the latter role she travelled widely, and gained inspiration for her third career, writing popular novels and short stories which often provided the basis for the 'Gainsborough melodramas' of the period. These stories often had a romanticized historical or Gypsy setting, based on her own research into Romany culture (she believed one of her paternal great-grandmothers to have been a Gypsy). During her time travelling with various circuses, she had contact with a wide array of artists and performers, and she often ventured out on her own to explore the areas where the circus would make camp.

Smith said during an interview that she began to write her novels at only 12 years old, but she claimed to have burned all of them later in life. Her first novel, Red Wagon, was published when she was 28 in 1930, and it immediately became a bestseller. Smith was a prolific writer, writing about one novel every year on average during her prime. One of her novels, Ballerina, was inspired by her friendships with Sergei Diaghilev and his prima ballerina, Anna Pavlova. Smith said, "Had I not watched Pavlova so closely that day at Golders Green, the book would never have been written...At the same time, I think that Pavlova had either directly or indirectly inspired us all, and Pavlova was dead. She had certainly inspired Pat, Frances, and myself". A few of her most notable novels were also adapted for films, one of which, Caravan, was not created until after her death. The actress Margaret Lockwood, one of the most popular actresses of the 1930s and 1940s, famously starred in The Man in Grey.

Smith also wrote ghost stories; many of them were collected in her book Satan's Circus (1932). Smith was a supporter of the Conservative Party. In 1937, she responded to Nancy Cunard's survey of writers and poets on the topic of the Spanish Civil War, saying that she was a "warm adherent of General Franco."

== Death ==
She died in Westminster in 1945 after a long illness. Although it was her wish to be buried with her father, her body was cremated by her family, who had been unaware of her last instructions and of her deathbed conversion to Roman Catholicism.

Her requiem mass was conducted by Father Martin D'Arcy at Church of the Immaculate Conception, Farm Street on 31 October 1945. Her mass was attended by several other members of literary and high society, including Sir Osbert Sitwell; Maureen, Marchioness of Dufferin and Ava; Cathleen, Marchioness of Queensberry; Margaret, Countess of Kimberley; Ann, Viscountess Rothermere; Bridget Parsons; and Lord Pakenham.

== Works ==
=== Novels ===
Year	Novel	Film adaptation
1930	Red Wagon	Red Wagon (1933)
1931	Flamenco	
1932	Ballerina	The Men in Her Life (1941)
1935	Tzigane	Gypsy (1937)
1935	Romany	
1936	Portrait of a Lady	
1938	The Spanish House	
1940	Lovers' Meeting	
1942	The Man in Grey	The Man in Grey (1943)
1943	Caravan	Caravan (1946)
1944	Magic Lantern	

=== Short stories ===
Year	Books	Notes
1932	Satan's Circus	
1933	Christmas Tree	

=== Others ===
Year	Work	Notes
1948	British Circus Life	
1983	Cornish Coastal Walks for Motorists	
1992	Coastal Walks in Cornwall	
1995	Short Walks from Cornish Pubs	
	Mrs. Raeburn's Waxwork	
	No Ships Pass	
