= The Man in Grey (novel) =

1941 British novel by Lady Eleanor Smith

- First US edition (publ. Doubleday Doran)
- Author: Eleanor Smith
- Language: English
- Publisher: Hutchinson
- Publication date: 1941
- LC Class: PZ3.S6457 Man

The Man in Grey was a novel by the British writer Lady Eleanor Smith first published in 1941. It was a melodrama set in Regency Britain. A young woman unhappily married to a cold aristocrat falls in love with a strolling actor, but her hopes of eloping to happiness are wrecked by an old school friend who murders her in order to be able to marry her husband.

== Publication details ==
- Lady Eleanor Furneaux Smith (1942). The man in grey. Doubleday, Doran and Company, inc.

== Adaptation ==
In 1943 the novel was adapted into a film by Gainsborough Pictures directed by Leslie Arliss and starring James Mason in the title role as well as Margaret Lockwood, Phyllis Calvert and Stewart Granger. The film was a major commercial and critical success and was the first of the series of Gainsborough melodramas which dominated the British box office during the later years of the war during the immediate post war years. Another Smith novel Caravan was turned into a 1946 film Caravan.
