= Dishonored Lady =

1947 film by Robert Stevenson, Hunt Stromberg, Jack Chertok

- Theatrical release poster
- Directed by: Robert Stevenson
- Screenplay by: Edmund H. North
- Based on: Dishonored Lady; 1930 play by Edward Sheldon and Margaret Ayer Barnes
- Produced by: Hedy Lamarr; Jack Chertok; Hunt Stromberg
- Starring: Hedy Lamarr; Dennis O'Keefe; John Loder
- Cinematography: Lucien N. Andriot
- Edited by: John M. Foley
- Music by: Carmen Dragon
- Color process: Black and white
- Production companies: Hunt Stromberg Productions; Mars Film Corporation
- Distributed by: United Artists
- Release date: May 16, 1947
- Running time: 85 minutes
- Country: United States
- Language: English
- Budget: $1.2 million (original)

Dishonored Lady (also known as Sins of Madeleine) is a 1947 American film noir crime film directed by Robert Stevenson and starring Hedy Lamarr, Dennis O'Keefe and John Loder. It is based on the 1930 play Dishonored Lady by Edward Sheldon and Margaret Ayer Barnes. Lamarr and Loder were married when they made the film, but they divorced later in 1947.

The film was released by United Artists in the United States on May 16, 1947.

== Plot ==
Dishonored Lady (1947)

Madeleine Damien is the fashion editor of a slick Manhattan magazine called Boulevard. Men are attracted to her, including boss Victor Kranish, wealthy advertiser Felix Courtland, and former assistant Jack Garet, who now works for Courtland and is blackmailing her about events from her past.

Madeleine attempts suicide and is headed toward a breakdown. She crashes her car near the home of psychiatrist Dr. Richard Caleb, who discovers her unconscious and cares for her. With Dr. Caleb's help, she realizes that she has been running away from herself just as her father may have done before he committed suicide. Under stress by her job's demands, she suddenly quits her job and disappears from the fashion scene. Under another name, she moves into a smaller apartment where she returns to painting, her earlier love. She meets her neighbor, handsome medical researcher David Cousins, who needs someone to draw the cells that he studies under the microscope. They work together closely, resulting in an excellent paper that David is invited to present at a conference. He proposes marriage, but Madeleine is hesitant because she has never told David about her troubled love life.

Madeleine's previous colleagues and Courtland learn what has become of her. Courtland surprises her at her apartment, but she rejects him. When David is away, a colleague from Boulevard contacts her for technical advice, but Madeleine wants nothing to do with the magazine. However, she consents to meet her colleague at a nightclub, and her former boss and assistant appear to meet her as well. She drinks too much and soon finds herself at Courtland's mansion by default. Courtland kisses her, but is interrupted when Garet appears. Garet had stolen a precious stone from Courtland, and he wants to try to dissuade Courtland from informing the police. Courtland refuses and noisily ejects Garet. When Madeleine awakens, she realizes that she can leave Courtland and slips away through the rain. Garet returns and kills Courtland by bludgeoning him with a table cigarette lighter just as Courtland is calling the police.

The next day, David returns early from his conference. Madeleine learns of the murder from the newspaper and realizes that she is in trouble, but the police soon arrive to arrest her. Madeleine's false identity becomes known, and David is aghast to hear of Madeleine's past, refusing to marry her.

Madeleine is charged with the murder. During her trial, she seems catatonic, completely uninterested in the proceedings and refusing counsel. David takes the witness stand and is asked if he still loves her, and he replies affirmatively. Following this, Madeleine becomes a cooperating witness. Courtland's home safe and the theft are discovered, and David suspects that Garet may be hiding something. David confronts Garet and subdues him in a fight. Garet is arrested and confesses to the murder, and Madeleine is declared innocent.

Madeleine leaves David a letter explaining that she cannot marry him until she is sure that she can really be the person whom he had believed her to be. While Madeleine is at the airport waiting for a plane, Dr. Caleb advises her that she is making a mistake by fleeing. David arrives just in time to grab Madeleine on the tarmac, and the plane departs without her as the two embrace.

== Cast ==
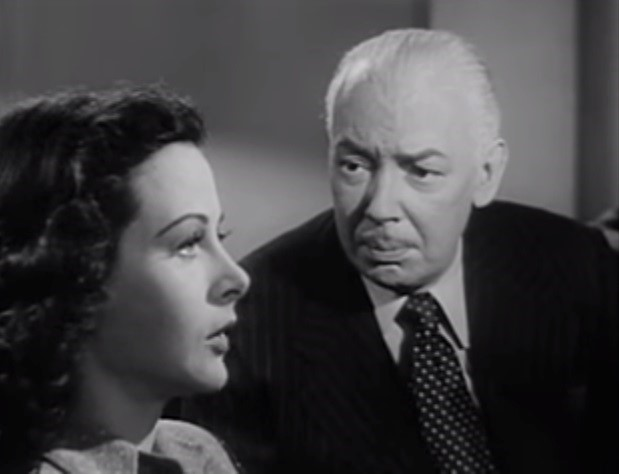
Hedy Lamarr and Nicholas Joy

- Hedy Lamarr as Madeleine Damien
- Dennis O'Keefe as Dr. David Cousins
- John Loder as Felix Courtland
- William Lundigan as Jack Garet
- Morris Carnovsky as Dr. Richard Caleb
- Natalie Schafer as Ethel Royce
- Paul Cavanagh as Victor Kranish
- Douglas Dumbrille as District Attorney O'Brien
- Margaret Hamilton as Mrs. Geiger
- Archie Twitchell as Freddie Fancher (uncredited)
- Dewey Robinson as Jim (uncredited)

== Production ==
Production was scheduled to begin no later than January 1945. However, problems with the Motion Picture Production Code caused a delay. The Hays Office insisted that two love affairs in the script, one in Mexico and the other in New York, might be "overloading" the picture, and also objected to the "night of sordid passion." A memo dated April 25, 1946 stated that, despite revisions, the script was unacceptable because of its gratuitous sex and references to Madeleine's unsavory family secrets. In the final film, references to Madeleine's parents were omitted completely. A character named Moreno and an affair in Mexico City were excised, and the "night of sordid passion" was not shown. All suggestions that Madeleine was a murderer, or had even contemplated murder, were also removed from the film. In the final script submitted to the Hays Office, Madeleine takes a trip hoping that the time will come when she can be with David; the reunion at the film's closing was added later.

The film was in production from early May to late July 1946 at California Studios. The sets were designed by art director Nicolai Remisoff.

The film exceeded its budget by $1.2 million and was a failure at the box office.

== See also ==
- List of films in the public domain in the United States
