= Gypsy (1937 film) =

- Chili Bouchier and Roland Young in the film
- Directed by: Roy William Neill
- Written by: Terence Rattigan; Brock Williams
- Based on: Tzigane; 1935 novel by Eleanor Smith
- Produced by: Irving Asher
- Starring: Roland Young; Chili Bouchier; Hugh Williams; Frederick Burtwell
- Cinematography: Basil Emmott
- Edited by: Bert Bates
- Production company: Warner Brothers
- Distributed by: Warner Brothers
- Release date: January 1937
- Running time: 78 minutes
- Country: United Kingdom
- Language: English

Gypsy (also known as Tzigane) is a 1937 British drama film directed by Roy William Neill and starring Roland Young, Chili Bouchier and Hugh Williams. It was written by Terence Rattigan and Brock Williams based on the 1935 novel Tzigane by Lady Eleanor Smith.

== Preservation status ==
The British Film Institute has classed Gypsy as a lost film. Its National Archive holds a collection of ephemera but only a small fragment of the film.

== Plot summary ==
Romani dancer Hassina falls in love with lion tamer Brazil and travels to London to find him. Brazil is supposedly working at the Crystal Palace, but he is not there when Hassina arrives. After fainting from lack of food, Hassina is taken into the home of wealthy middle-aged bachelor Alan Brooks, who falls in love with her.

== Cast ==
- Roland Young as Alan Brooks
- Chili Bouchier as Hassina
- Hugh Williams as Brazil
- Frederick Burtwell as Pim
- Glen Alyn as Lilli
- Brian Buchel as Vicot
- Andreas Malandrinos as Hunyadi
- Victor Fairley as Strauss

== Production ==
The film was made at Teddington Studios by the British subsidiary of Warner Brothers.

== Reception ==
The Monthly Film Bulletin wrote: "Roland Young as Alan is the backbone of the piece, every look, tone and gesture adding to the portrayal. Chili Bouchier is a fiery Hassina and Hugh Williams a most correctly English Brazil, extremely unlike a lion tamer. The story is never made to seem quite credible and the film, in consequence, is not very interesting."

Kine Weekly wrote: "Bizarre romantic comedy, lightly based on Eleanor Smith's novel Tzigane. Bereft ot the author's descriptive work, the story does not amount to much, nor is Chili Bouchier an outstanding success in the feminine lead, but Roland Young fortunately runs true to form, and thanks chiefly to him the sketchy happenings succeed in conjuring up a fair quota ol laughs. Boisterous rather than subtle, the entertainment is devised principally for the unsophisticated. Fair average popular booking."

The Daily Film Renter wrote: "More serious moments do not entirely convince, but comedy provides strong suit, considerable fun deriving from unconventional antics of wild heroine in conservative English household. Polished portrayals by Roland Young and Frederick Burtwell, and attractive settings, are added features. Agreeable popular offering."

Picturegoer wrote: "The main source of entertainment In this rather bizarre comedy comes from Roland Young, who is in good form. ... There is not much in the story and the characterisation generally is none too convincing. What comedy there is results from the old device of introducing an untutored young lady into social circles. Chili Bouchier does not seem at ease in a part where she has to simulate a foreigner and her dancing is unremarkable. As Brazil, Hugh Williams is miscast, but Frederick Burtwell scores some laughs as a butler embarrassed by the advent of the fiery gypsy."

Picture Show wrote: "Chili Bouchier is very charming as the tempestuous Hassina, and plays the part in a way that suggests she would be at home in the real thing. ... Roland Young acts well, especially in comedy scenes with his butler (played by Fred Burtwell), but the role has not enough scope for an actor of Mr. Young's ability."
