= Flamenco (novel) =

1931 novel by Eleanor Smith

- First US edition
- Author: Eleanor Smith
- Language: English
- Genre: Drama
- Publisher: Gollancz (UK); Bobbs-Merrill (US)
- Publication date: 1931
- Publication place: United Kingdom
- Media type: Print

Flamenco is a 1931 novel by the British writer Eleanor Smith.

== Bibliography ==
- Vinson, James. Twentieth-Century Romance and Gothic Writers. Macmillan, 1982.
