= Raquel Torres =

Mexican-American actress (1908–1987)

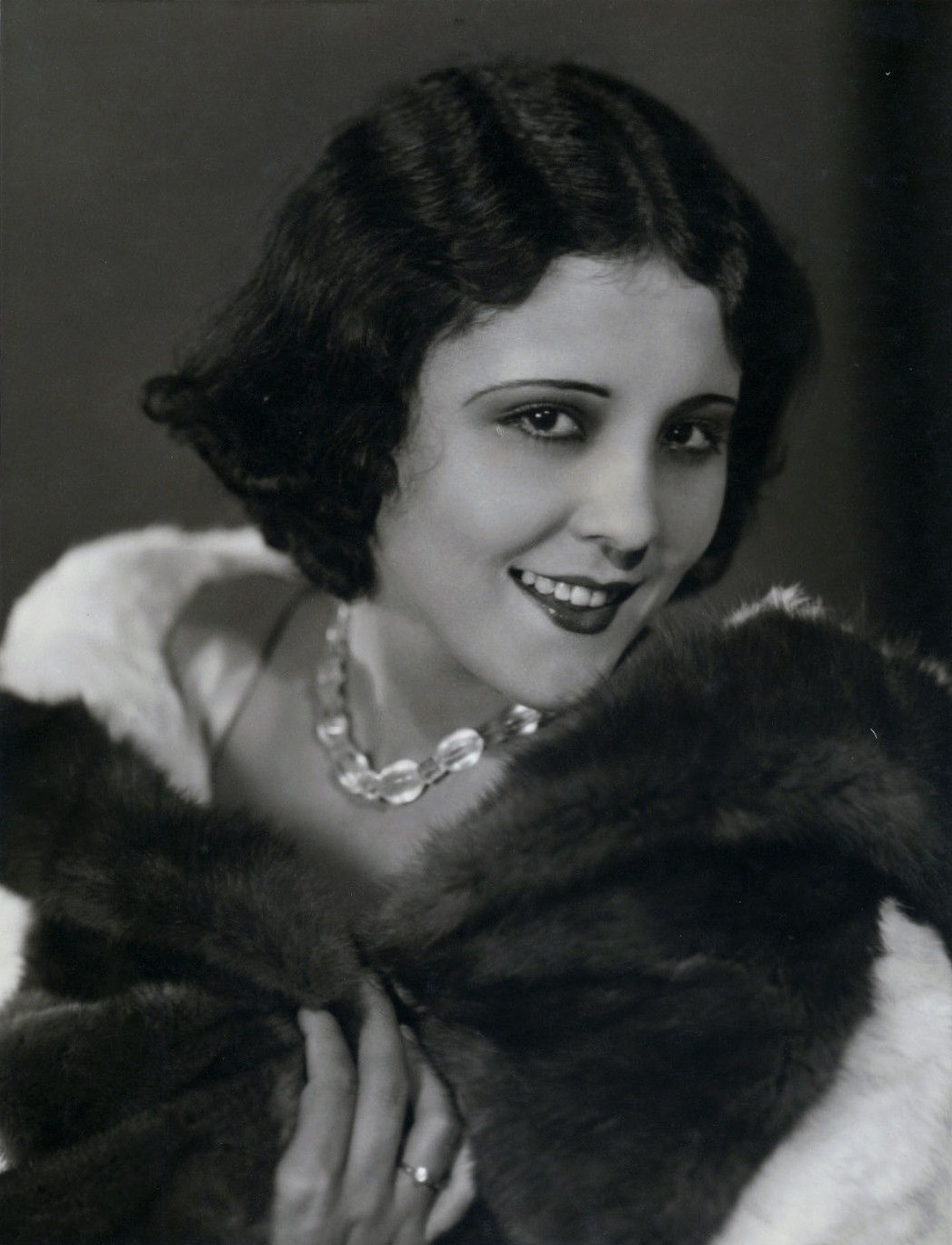
- Torres in 1930
- Born: November 11, 1908; Hermosillo, Mexico
- Died: August 10, 1987 (aged 78); Malibu, California, U.S
- Occupation: Actress
- Years active: 1928–1936
- Spouse(s): Stephen Ames (m. 1935; died 1955) Jon Hall (m. 1959; div. 19??) (m. 19??; div. 19??)

Raquel Torres (born either Paula Marie Osterman or Wilhelmina von Osterman; November 11, 1908 – August 10, 1987) was a Mexican-born American film actress. Her sister was actress Renee Torres.

== Early life ==
Torres was born in Hermosillo to a German emigrant father and a Mexican mother. Her mother died while Raquel was very young and the family moved to the United States, where she spent most of her time. Her name change, including adoption of her mother's maiden surname, as well as speaking with a fake accent, was done to capitalize on, and conform to, early Hollywood's idea of 'Latin-ness'.

== Career ==
Torres played a Polynesian beauty in White Shadows in the South Seas (1928), a silent film shot in Tahiti which was Metro-Goldwyn-Mayer's first feature fully synchronized with music and effects. She gained the role after 300 applicants were rejected. She also became the first person to have her voice recorded as part of "a new system in the selection of motion picture talent".

The next year she was third-billed behind Lili Damita and Ernest Torrence in The Bridge of San Luis Rey (1929), the first film version of the classic Thornton Wilder novel, which was a part-talkie. This Oscar winner (for Art Direction) was an early disaster movie that bonded a group of strangers who see their lives flash before their eyes while trapped on a collapsing bridge. Torres' other 1929 film was The Desert Rider (1929), a standard western in which she provided spicy diversion opposite cowboy star Tim McCoy.

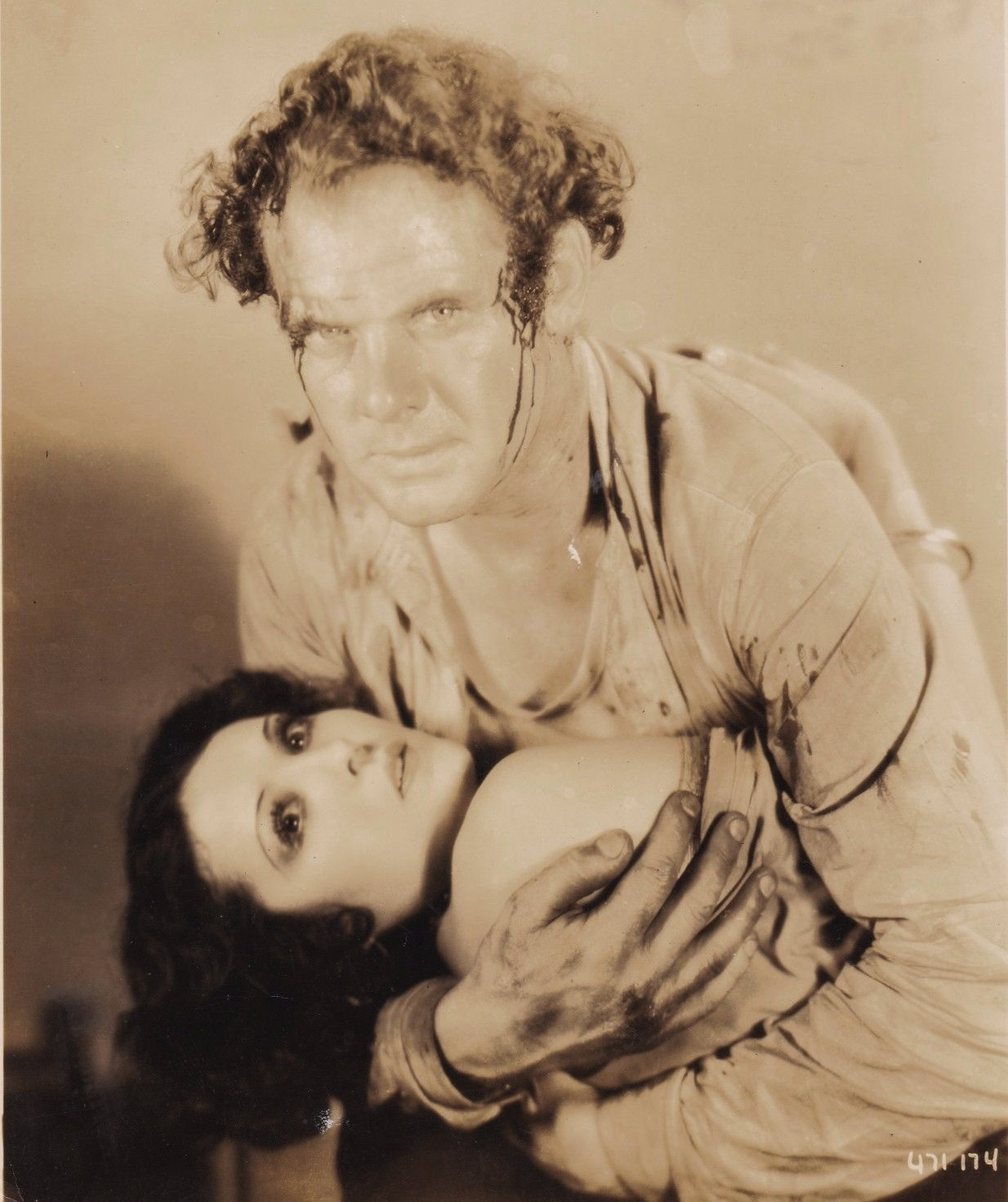
Charles Bickford and Torres in The Sea Bat (1930)

Torres continued the tropical island pace with The Sea Bat (1930) and Aloha (1931) playing various island girls and biracial beauty types. Also in 1931, she had a vaudeville act in New York. On Broadway, she played Teresa in Adam Had Two Sons (1932).

In her last year of filming, she played a sexy foil to the raucous comedy teams of Bert Wheeler and Robert Woolsey in So This Is Africa (1933) and the Marx Brothers in Duck Soup (1933). It was Torres to whom Groucho delivered his classic line: "I could dance with you until the cows came home. On second thought, I'd rather dance with the cows until you came home."

Torres abruptly retired following her marriage to businessman Stephen Ames in 1935. Her husband later produced postwar "B" films but she never returned to the film industry even with her husband's connections.

== Romance and marriages ==
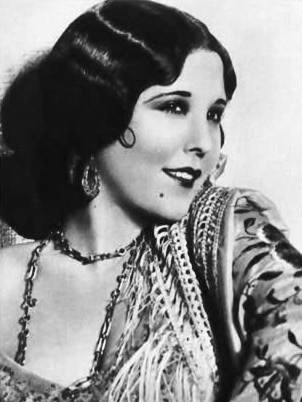
Raquel Torres in 1930.

In 1934, Torres met the New York stockbroker Stephen Ames at a Hollywood party. At the time Ames was still married to film actress Adrienne Ames and Torres was escorted to the party by film agent Charles K. Feldman. Torres was suffering from a cold and found a quiet corner for solitude. Ames came over and asked her "Why so quiet?" She told him about "the terrible cold in my head". Ames described some of his favorite remedies and the actress appreciated how considerate Ames was. A year later they met again in New York. Ames was by now divorced and Torres had not gone through with an anticipated wedding. They met a number of times in New York and Hollywood before Stephen asked her to marry him at the Colony Club while they were dancing. After deliberating for the night Torres decided to marry him when he called her the following day.

Ames presented her with a gift, a Rolls-Royce, and two weeks later they were married. Following their wedding, they spent several months in New York and Florida prior to purchasing an option on two and a half acres of land in the exclusive Los Angeles enclave of Bel Air where they wanted to build a home. Ames died in 1955.

In 1959, Torres married actor Jon Hall, a hero of 1930s and 1940s South Sea epics. They divorced several years later.

== Fire damage ==
In October 1985, a fire in Malibu, California damaged several homes in the Las Flores Canyon area. Embers carried by wind across the wide Pacific Coast Highway ignited the roof of Raquel Torres' home. Her single story house was located at 22350 Pacific Coast Highway. The dwelling was 80% destroyed, but the actress escaped unharmed, escorted by firefighters to safety.

== Death ==
On August 10, 1987, Torres died from a heart attack in Malibu, California. She was 78 years old.

== Filmography ==
Year	Title	Role	Notes
1928	White Shadows in the South Seas	Fayaway	
1929	The Bridge of San Luis Rey	Pepita	Released as both silent and part-talkie, part-talkie version is lost
1929	The Desert Rider	Dolores Alvarado	
1930	Under a Texas Moon	Raquella	
1930	The Sea Bat	Nina	
1930	Estrellados	Elvira Rosas	
1930	The March of Time	Herself	Unreleased
1931	Aloha	Ilanu	
1933	So This Is Africa	Tarzana	
1933	The Woman I Stole	Teresita	
1933	Duck Soup	Vera Marcal	
1933	Red Wagon	Sheba Prince / Starlina	
1936	Go West, Young Man	Rico's Girlfriend in 'Drifting Lady'	Uncredited
