= Christmas Tree (short story collection) =

Short story collection by British writer Eleanor Smith

- First edition (UK)
- Author: Eleanor Smith
- Language: English
- Genre: Short stories
- Publisher: Gollancz (Britain); Bobbs Merrill (US)
- Publication date: 1933
- Publication place: United Kingdom
- Media type: Print

Christmas Tree is a collection of short stories by the British writer Eleanor Smith, better known for her novels. It was released in the United States in 1935 under the alternative title of Seven Trees.

== Bibliography ==
- Vinson, James. Twentieth-Century Romance and Gothic Writers. Macmillan, 1982.
