= Caravan (novel) =

1942 novel by Eleanor Smith

- First edition (publ. Hutchinson)
- Author: Lady Eleanor Smith
- Publisher: Hutchinson
- Publication date: 1942

Caravan is a melodramatic novel by the British writer Lady Eleanor Smith first published in 1942.

== Synopsis ==
A young Englishman James Darrell goes on the road living with the Romany people in England while trying to make enough money as a writer to marry his sweetheart Oriana. However, she does not wait for him and marries a wealthy young Englishman. James then undertakes a mission to Spain for a business friend, while there he is attacked and robbed. He is rescued by a gypsy woman but he has lost his memory. Having lost his memory, he marries the gypsy girl, Rosal, without knowing of his former life in Britain. When his memory returns he resents the gypsy girl for deceiving him but stays with her and works as a secretary for a famous bullfighter. When Rosal is accidentally killed by the bullfighter, the hero goes to Morocco. Upon his return to England his book on his journeys in Spain make him a famous and wealthy man. He reunites with his first love, Oriana, who is trapped in a loveless marriage. The book is written as a young reporter is sent to interview James Darrell on the occasion of his 70th birthday, and is written as a "flashback" by the old author.

== Film adaptation ==
In 1946 the novel was adapted into a film Caravan by Gainsborough Pictures as part of the Gainsborough melodramas sequence of films. The film was directed by Arthur Crabtree and starred Stewart Granger, Jean Kent, Anne Crawford and Dennis Price.

== Bibliography ==
- Murphy, Robert. Realism and Tinsel: Cinema and Society in Britain 1939-48. Routledge, 1992.
