= Tzigane (novel) =

1935 novel by Eleanor Smith

- Author: Eleanor Smith
- Language: English
- Genre: Romance
- Publication date: 1935
- Publication place: United Kingdom
- Media type: Print

Tzigane is a novel by the English writer Lady Eleanor Smith, which was first published in 1935. Along with several of her other works it contains a gypsy theme.

== Film adaptation ==
In 1937 the novel was adapted into a film Gypsy directed by Roy William Neill.

== Bibliography ==
- Low, Rachael. Filmmaking in 1930s Britain. George Allen & Unwin, 1985.
- Nicholson, Virginia. Among the Bohemians: Experiments in Living 1900-1939. Penguin, 2003.
