= Tzigane (TV Tzigane) =

Canadian music television series

- Written by: Frank Varon
- Country of origin: Canada
- Original language: English
- No. of seasons: 1

Production
- Producer: Michael Pym
- Production location: Montreal

Original release
- Network: CBC Television
- Release: 10 July – 25 September 1954

Tzigane is a Canadian music television program that aired on CBC Television in 1954.

== Premise ==
The Montreal-produced program features music and dance from central Europe. The episodes portrayed a Hungarian gypsy community on a fictitious island within the Danube river. The featured musicians were George Lapenson on violin accompanied by singers Irene Andriane and Yolande Guerard.

== Scheduling ==
This half-hour program aired on Saturdays at 7:30 p.m. from 10 July to 25 September 1954.
