= Free and Easy (1930 film) =

1930 American comedy film

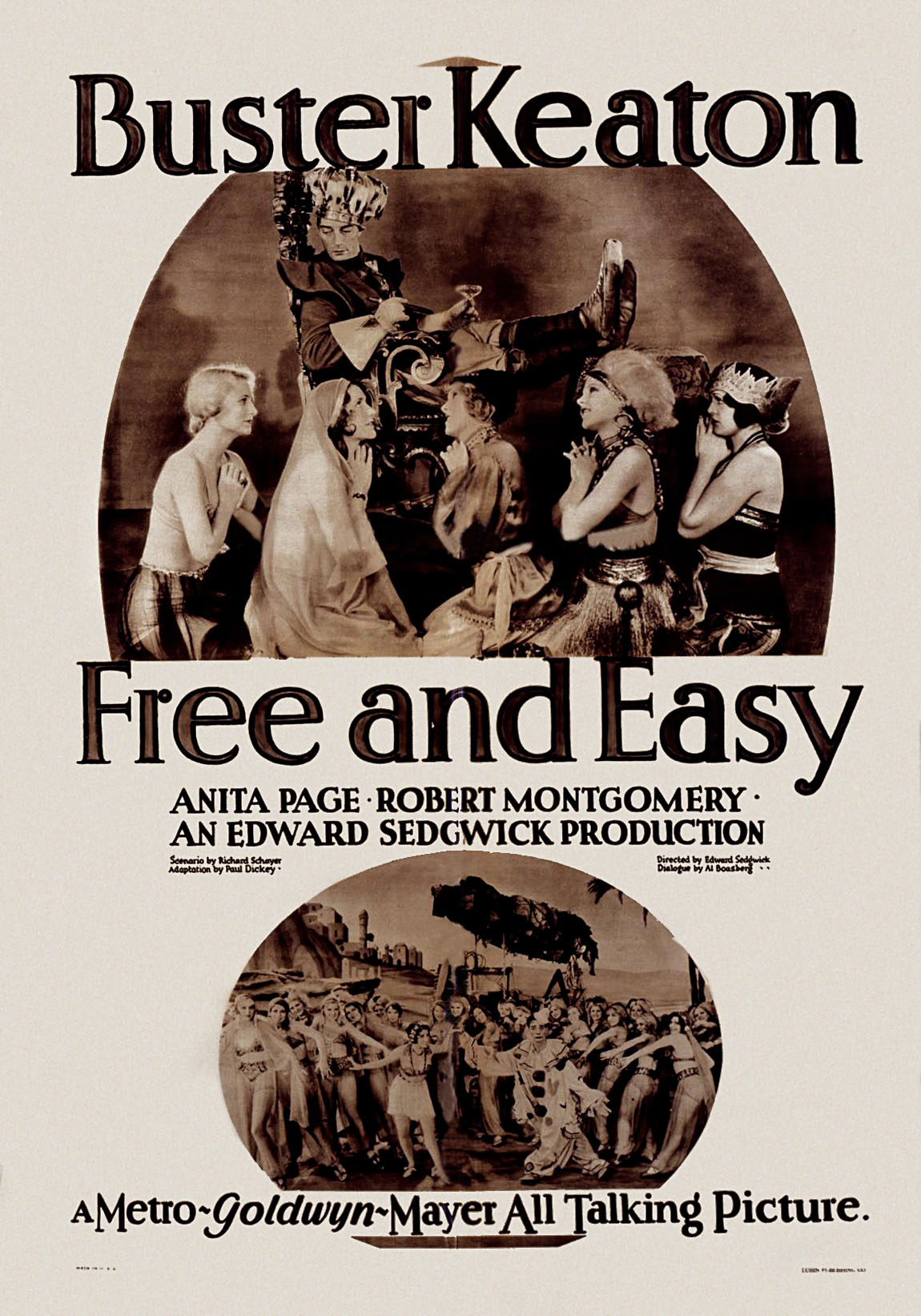
- theatrical release poster
- Directed by: Edward Sedgwick
- Written by: Richard Schayer (scenario); Paul Dickey (adaptation); Al Boasberg (dialogue); Alexander Stein (French titles); Allen Byre (French titles)
- Produced by: Buster Keaton; Edward Sedgwick (both uncredited)
- Starring: Buster Keaton; Anita Page; Robert Montgomery
- Cinematography: Leonard Smith
- Edited by: William LeVanway; George Todd
- Music by: Fred E. Ahlert; Roy Turk; William Axt (foreign vers.)
- Production company: Metro-Goldwyn-Mayer
- Distributed by: Metro-Goldwyn-Mayer
- Release date: March 22, 1930 (US)
- Running time: 92 minutes
- Country: United States
- Language: English

Free and Easy is a 1930 American pre-Code comedy film starring Buster Keaton. It was Keaton's first leading role in a talking motion picture.

== Plot ==
Free and Easy (1930)

When small-town resident Elvira Plunkett wins a contest that sends her to Hollywood for a screen test at Metro-Goldwyn-Mayer (MGM), she is accompanied by her overbearing mother and Elmer J. Butts, a gas-station attendant who goes along as Elvira's manager. Elmer is secretly in love with Elvira, but on the train they meet MGM contract actor Larry Mitchell, who falls for her as well, and he has the connections to make her a star.

In Hollywood, Elmer manages to bungle his way through numerous films being shot on the MGM lot, disrupting production. When given a screen test, he can't manage to say his one line correctly. Despite these flubs, both he and Elvira's mother are given film contracts, and they appear in a comic opera together. Elmer wants to tell Elvira that he loves her, but he hints at it in such a way that she mistakes it for advice on how to tell Larry that she loves him.

== Cast ==
- Buster Keaton as Elmer
- Anita Page as Elvira
- Trixie Friganza as Ma Plunkett
- Robert Montgomery as Larry Mitchell
- Lionel Barrymore as director
- Fred Niblo as himself
- David Burton as himself
- William Haines as himself
- Marion Shilling as himself
- Cecil B. DeMille as himself

== Production ==
Free and Easy, whose working title was On the Set, was Buster Keaton's first starring role in a film shot for sound – he had appeared in MGM's talking The Hollywood Revue of 1929, but did not speak. As with Spite Marriage, his previous film for MGM, production on Free and Easy was largely out of Keaton's hands.

The film showcased MGM's stars and filmmakers, several of whom make cameos, including William Haines, Cecil B. DeMille, and Lionel Barrymore. The film was also shot in French, German, and Spanish versions. For the Spanish edition, titled Estrellados, Keaton spoke his dialogue phonetically while a new supporting cast spoke in their native Spanish language, but the 1931 release in France had French-language intertitles replacing the English dialogue.

MGM spent almost $500,000 on the production of Free and Easy. Keaton sings on the screen for the first time: an elaborate song-and-dance rendition of the title tune.

== Reception ==
Contemporary reviews were mixed, with The New York Times reviewer Mordaunt Hall stating that Keaton's "audible performance is just as funny as his antics in mute offerings," while Robert E. Sherwood in The Film Daily wrote that "Buster Keaton, trying to imitate a standard musical comedy clown, is no longer Buster Keaton and no longer funny." Modern reviews are even less enthusiastic, with critic John J. Puccio stating that the film "contains far too much talk and far too few visual gags."

Free and Easy was a bigger hit than most of Keaton's silent films. The film itself entered the public domain in 2026.

== Remakes ==
Free and Easy was remade twice, first as Pick a Star (1937) and later as Abbott and Costello in Hollywood (1945). There is also an MGM comedy with Robert Cummings and Ruth Hussey called Free and Easy (1941) which, apart from the title, has no relation to the 1930 film.

When the Keaton Free and Easy was first released to syndicated television, it was retitled Easy Go to avoid confusion with the 1941 film using the same title.

== See also ==
- Lionel Barrymore filmography
- Estrellados, a Spanish language production of the film
