= White Shadows in the South Seas =

1928 film

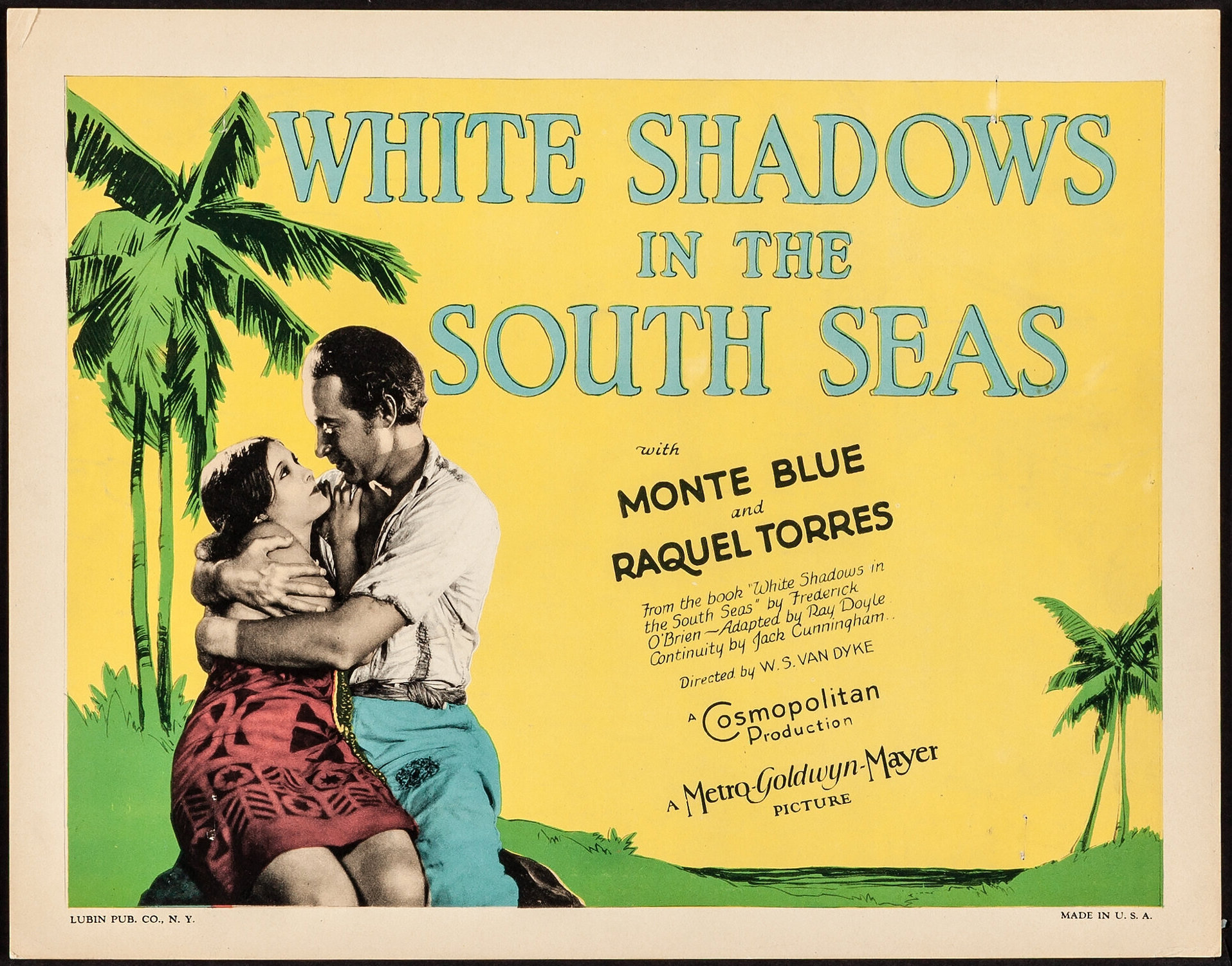
- Lobby card
- Directed by: W. S. Van Dyke
- Written by: Intertitles: John Colton
- Screenplay by: Jack Cunningham; Ray Doyle
- Based on: White Shadows in the South Seas; 1919 travel book by Frederick O'Brien
- Produced by: Irving Thalberg; Hunt Stromberg; William Randolph Hearst
- Starring: Monte Blue; Raquel Torres
- Cinematography: Clyde De Vinna; Bob Roberts; George Gordon Nogle
- Edited by: Ben Lewis
- Music by: William Axt; David Mendoza
- Production company: Cosmopolitan Productions
- Distributed by: Metro-Goldwyn-Mayer
- Release date: July 31, 1928
- Running time: 89 minutes
- Country: United States
- Languages: Sound (Synchronized); English intertitles
- Budget: $365,000
- Box office: $1.6 million (worldwide rentals)

White Shadows in the South Seas is a 1928 American synchronized sound romantic adventure film directed by W.S. Van Dyke and starring Monte Blue and Raquel Torres. It was produced by Cosmopolitan Productions in association with Metro-Goldwyn-Mayer, who distributed the film. While the film has no audible dialog, it was released with a synchronized musical score with sound effects using the sound-on-film Western Electric Sound System process. Loosely based on the travel book of the same name by Frederick O'Brien, this film is important historically for being the first sound MGM film to be released with a pre-recorded soundtrack. Clyde De Vinna won an Academy Award for Best Cinematography.

== Plot ==
White Shadows in the South Seas (1928)

Dr. Matthew Lloyd, an alcoholic doctor, is disgusted by white traders' exploitation of native pearl divers on a Polynesian island. The traders give the divers well below the value of the pearls while the divers suffer numerous injuries, some fatal, from the sea bed and from diving without breathing equipment.

When a diver is gravely injured, Sebastian, a leading trader, is indifferent, demanding that the other divers keep working. When Lloyd remonstrates, Sebastian threatens him, demands he leave the island and swings a punch at him. Later, the diver dies despite Lloyd's treatment but the traders have a party all the same.

Sebastian tricks Lloyd onto an arriving ship by saying they have measles. His men tie the doctor up and send the ship off unmanned. Lloyd survives a storm and is washed ashore on an island where none of the natives has ever seen a white man.

== Cast ==
- Monte Blue as Dr. Lloyd
- Raquel Torres as Fayaway
- Robert Anderson as Sebastian
- Renee Bush as Fayaway's friend (uncredited)

== Music ==
This film featured a theme song entitled "Flower Of Love" which was composed by William Axt, David Mendoza, Herman Ruby, and Dave Dreyer.

== Production history ==
The film is inspired by the 1919 travel book of the same name by Frederick O'Brien, who spent a year in the South Pacific with Marquesas Islanders. The film began production in 1927 as a co-venture between documentary filmmaker Robert Flaherty, Cosmopolitan, and MGM. The production was filmed in Tahiti, some 4000 miles from Hollywood, a rarity for the time.

The film is known for being the first MGM film to be released with a pre-recorded soundtrack. The soundtrack consisted of a romantic score by William Axt and David Mendoza, with a few sound effects such as wind howling, a storm, trees ruffling, and the words "hello" and "wait." The Tahitian location was sumptuously captured by cameramen Clyde De Vinna, Bob Roberts, and George Nogle. De Vinna picked up an Academy Award for Best Cinematography for his efforts at the 1929 ceremonies, the second year the cinematography award was given out. De Vinna had previously been to Tahiti with director Raoul Walsh when they made the 1923 island adventure Lost and Found on a South Sea Island for Goldwyn Pictures.

Frederick O'Brien had spent a year on Hiva Oa prior to the publication of his 1919 book, living amongst native Marquesan islanders. Robert Flaherty had lived with his wife and children in Samoa from April 1923 to December 1924 filming the feature documentary Moana released in January 1926 by Paramount Pictures.

Several years later, MGM production head Irving Thalberg, while recuperating during a hospital stay, read O'Brien's book. In 1927 Thalberg decided to film O'Brien's book. Flaherty, a friend of O'Brien's, was brought aboard as director while W. S. Van Dyke was added as support to Flaherty. The production would head to Papeete, Tahiti.

The new film would feature a supporting cast consisting of almost all Tahitian islanders and actors, with only the featured stars and a few heavies or villains coming from Hollywood. Flaherty, upon arriving in Tahiti, began shooting the film at a slow pace which was not practical for MGM. After clashing with Van Dyke, Flaherty left the production, leaving Van Dyke as sole director for the film. Van Dyke then finished the project on schedule. However, Flaherty did shoot some scenes before departing the production, and some footage of his may be seen in the existing print, e.g., '...the lagoon in the jungle scene'.

A dispute over this film with producer Hunt Stromberg led David Selznick to quit Metro Goldwyn Mayer. "David thought it an idyllic story; Hunt said he wanted lots of tits."

This film was the first time audiences heard the roar of Leo the Lion, over the MGM banner at the beginning of the film.

== Reception ==
The film was successful at the box office, covering its high cost and earning a profit for MGM.

== Recognition ==
=== Critical response ===
Mordaunt Hall felt the film was "average" and expressed disappointment at how the film was advertised as a "sound" film yet, the only sound heard other than sound effects such as whistling, cheering, and crying was the yelling of the word "hello", which itself had the volume of a whisper.

=== Awards and nominations ===
- 1930, Won Academy Award for Best Cinematography for Clyde De Vinna

== DVD release ==
On January 12, 2010, the film had its first home video release on DVD.

== See also ==
- List of early sound feature films (1926–1929)
- The Pagan (1929) a follow up film
- South Seas genre
