= Charles Bickford =

American actor (1891–1967)

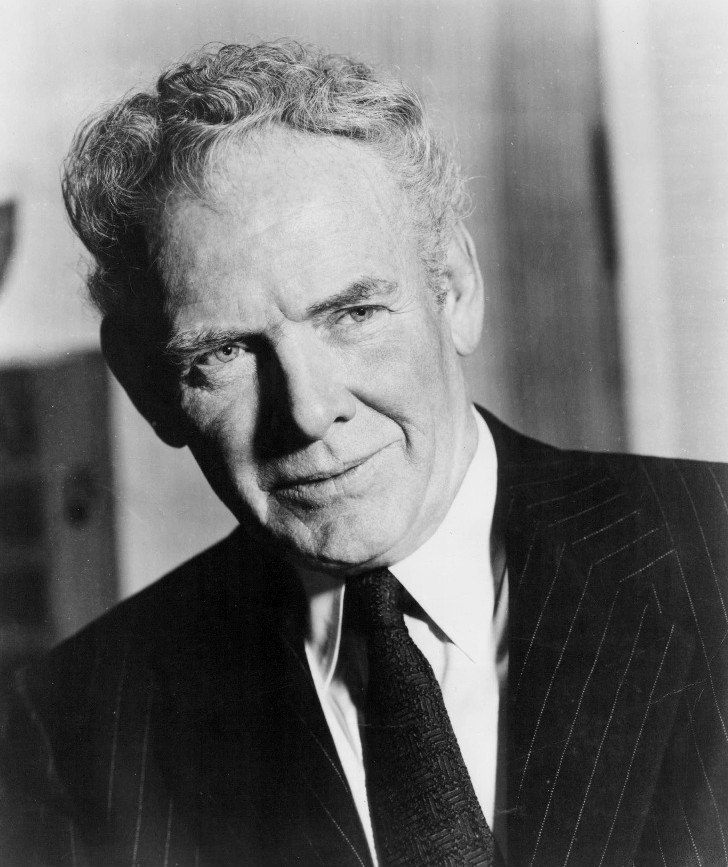
- Bickford as host of The Man Behind the Badge (circa 1955)
- Born: Charles Ambrose Bickford; January 1, 1891; Cambridge, Massachusetts, U.S.
- Died: November 9, 1967 (aged 76); Los Angeles, California
- Occupation: Actor
- Years active: 1911–1967
- Spouse: Beatrice Ursula Allen (m. 1916)
- Children: 2

Charles Ambrose Bickford (January 1, 1891 – November 9, 1967) was an American actor known for supporting roles. He was nominated three times for the Academy Award for Best Supporting Actor for The Song of Bernadette (1943), The Farmer's Daughter (1947) and Johnny Belinda (1948). His other roles include Whirlpool (1950), A Star Is Born (1954) and The Big Country (1958).

== Early life ==
Bickford was born in Cambridge, Massachusetts, during the first minute of 1891. His parents were Loretus and Mary Ellen Bickford. The fifth of seven children, he was an intelligent but very independent and unruly child. He had a particularly strong relationship with his maternal grandfather, a sea captain, who was a powerful influence during his formative years. At the age of nine, he was tried and acquitted of the attempted murder of a trolley motorman, who had callously driven over and killed his beloved dog. He attended Foster School and Everett High School.

Always more interested in experiencing life than reading about it, Bickford was considered "the wild rogue" of the family, causing his parents frequent consternation. In his late teens, he drifted aimlessly around the United States for a time. Before breaking into acting, he worked as a lumberjack and investment promoter, and for a short time, ran a pest-extermination business. He was a stoker and fireman in the United States Navy when a friend dared him to get a job in burlesque. Bickford served as an engineer lieutenant in the United States Army during World War I. His first entry into acting was on the stage, eventually including Broadway. This venue provided him with an occasional living and served as the principal training ground for developing his acting and vocal talents.

== Career ==
Bickford had intended to attend the Massachusetts Institute of Technology (MIT) to earn an engineering degree, but while wandering around the country, he became friends with the manager of a burlesque show, who convinced Bickford to take a role in the show. He debuted in Oakland, California in 1911. Bickford enjoyed himself so much that he abandoned his plans to attend MIT. He made his legitimate stage debut with the John Craig Stock Company at the Castle Square Theatre in Boston in 1912. He eventually joined a road company and traveled throughout the United States for more than a decade, appearing in various productions. In 1925, while working in a Broadway play called Outside Looking In, co-star James Cagney (in his first Broadway role) and he received rave reviews. He was offered a role in Herbert Brenon's 1926 film of Beau Geste, but anxious not to give up his newfound Broadway stardom, refused it, a decision he later came to regret. Following his appearance in the critically praised but unsuccessful Maxwell Anderson-Harold Hickerson drama about the Sacco and Vanzetti case Gods of the Lightning (Bickford was the Sacco character), he was contacted by filmmaker Cecil B. DeMille and offered a contract with Metro-Goldwyn-Mayer (MGM) studios to star in DeMille's first talking picture: Dynamite. He soon began working with MGM studio chief Louis B. Mayer on a number of projects.

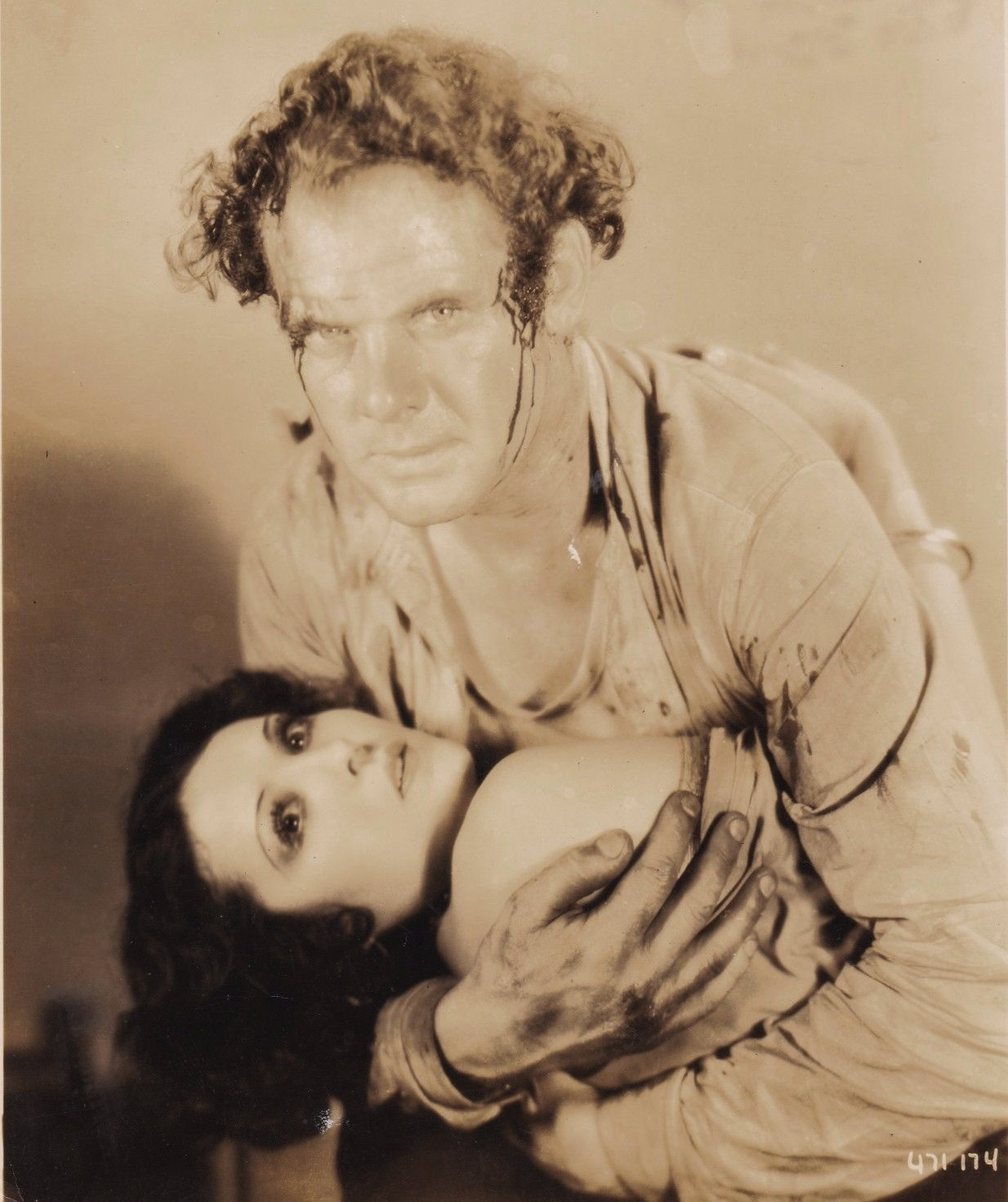
Bickford and Raquel Torres in The Sea Bat (1930)

Bickford became a star after playing Greta Garbo's lover in Anna Christie (1930), but never developed into a leading man. Always independent minded, exceptionally strong-willed, and quick with his fists, Bickford frequently argued and nearly came to blows with Mayer and any number of other MGM authority figures during the course of this contract with the studio. During the production of Dynamite, he punched out his director following a string of heated arguments, primarily related to the interpretation of his character's role. Throughout his early career on both the stage and later films, Bickford rejected numerous scripts and made no secret of his disdain for much of the material he was offered. Not surprisingly, his association with MGM was short-lived, with Bickford asking for and quickly receiving a release from his contract. He soon found himself blacklisted at other studios, though, forcing him to take the highly unusual step (for that era) of becoming an independent actor for several years. His career took another turn in 1935, when he was mauled by a lion and nearly killed while filming East of Java. While he recovered, he lost his contract with Twentieth Century-Fox and his leading-man status owing to extensive neck scarring suffered in the attack, coupled with his advancing age. Soon, he made a very successful transition to character roles, which he felt offered much greater diversity and allowed him to showcase his talent to better effect. Much preferring the character roles that became his forte, Bickford appeared in many notable films, including The Farmer's Daughter, Johnny Belinda, A Star Is Born, and Not as a Stranger.

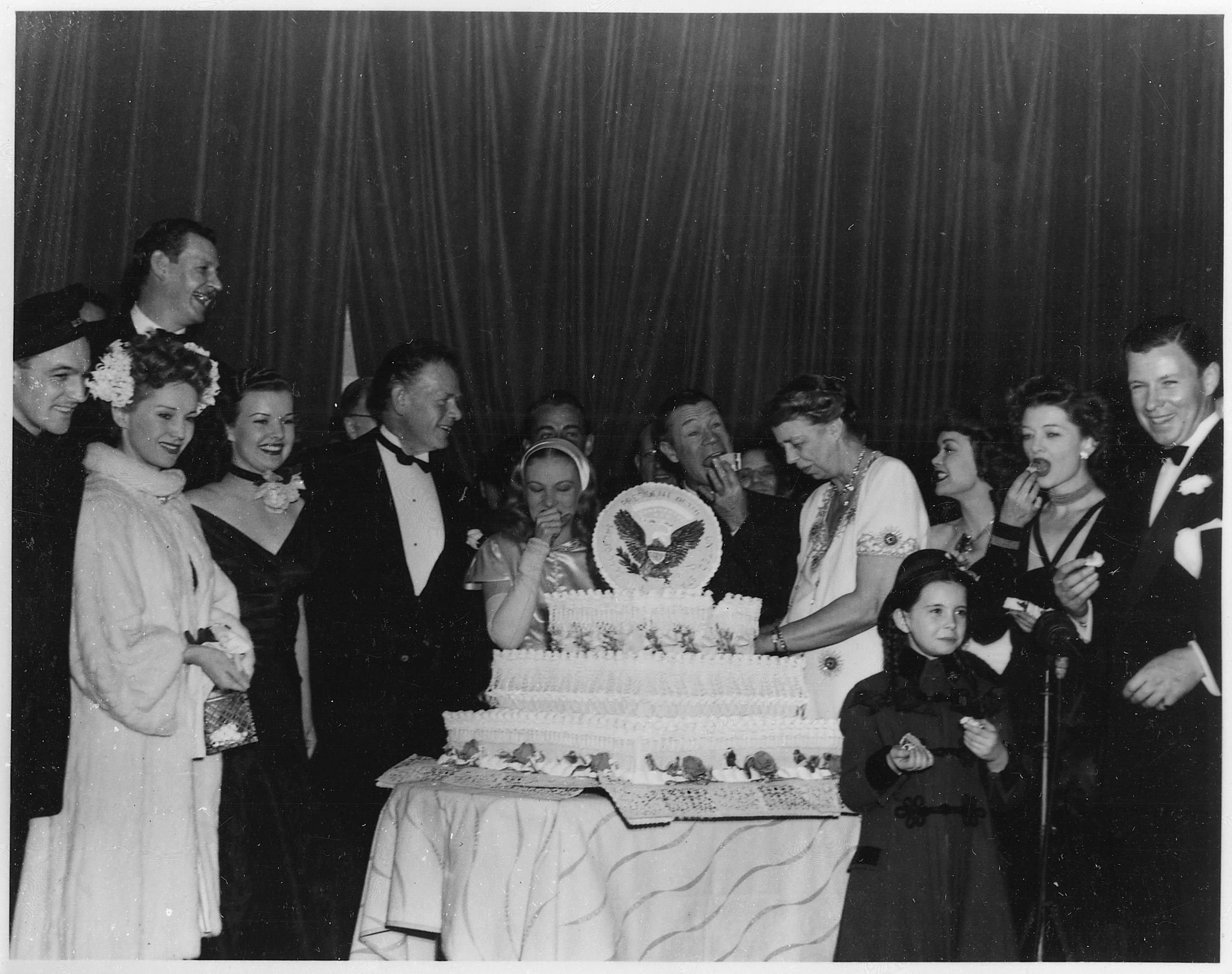
Gene Kelly, Charles Bickford, Veronica Lake, Joe E. Brown, Eleanor Roosevelt, Jane Wyman, Myrna Loy, George Murphy, and Margaret O'Brien in 1945

Finding steady work playing a variety of character roles in films and later in television, Bickford was known for his burly frame and craggy, intense features, along with a gruff, powerful voice, which suited many different roles. He frequently portrayed father figures, stern businessmen, heavies, ship captains, or authority figures. During the 1940s, he was nominated three times for the Academy Award for Best Supporting Actor. He was the host of the 1950s television series The Man Behind the Badge.

On April 16, 1958, Bickford appeared with Roger Smith in "The Daniel Barrister Story" on Wagon Train.

Bickford continued to act in projects right up to his death. He guest-starred on The Islanders, The Barbara Stanwyck Show, and The Eleventh Hour. In his final years, Bickford played rancher John Grainger, owner of the Shiloh Ranch, on The Virginian. Bickford was well-liked by both fans and his fellow actors, including series lead James Drury. According to Drury, Bickford, who guest-starred earlier in the series in an unrelated role, wished he could have been on the series from the beginning. According to Paul Green, author of A History of Television's The Virginian, 1962-1971, Bickford's vigorous portrayal of John Grainger helped restore the quality of the show after what some considered a chaotic fourth season.

Two of the actor's late-career, big-screen roles came in the Western The Big Country (1958), as a wealthy and ruthless rancher, with Gregory Peck and Charlton Heston; and in the drama Days of Wine and Roses (1962), as the forlorn father of an alcoholic, with Jack Lemmon and Lee Remick. President Dwight D. Eisenhower ran The Big Country four nights in a row in the White House when it was first released.

== Personal life ==
Bickford married actress Beatrice Ursula Allen (stage name Beatrice Loring) in Manhattan in 1916. The couple had two children, daughter Doris, known as "Bunny", and son Rex.

In 1965, Bickford published his autobiography Bulls, Balls, Bicycles, & Actors.

== Death and legacy ==
Bickford died in Los Angeles on November 9, 1967, at age 76, of pneumonia and a blood infection after being hospitalized for an extended period.

Bickford received two stars on the Hollywood Walk of Fame in 1960. His motion-picture star is located at 6780 Hollywood Boulevard, and his television star is located at 1620 Vine Street.

== Filmography ==
=== As actor ===
- South Sea Rose (1929) - Capt. Briggs
- Dynamite (1929) - Hagon Derk
- Hell's Heroes (1929) - Bob Sangster
- Anna Christie (1930) - Matt Burke
- The Sea Bat (1930) - John Dennis aka Reverend Sims
- River's End (1930) - John Keith / Sgt. John Conniston
- Passion Flower (1930) - Dan Wallace
- East of Borneo (1931) - Dr. Allan Randolph
- The Squaw Man (1931) - Cash Hawkins
- The Pagan Lady (1931) - Dingo Mike
- Men in Her Life (1931) - 'Flashy' Madden
- Panama Flo (1932) - Dan McTeague
- Scandal for Sale (1932) - Jerry Strong
- Thunder Below (1932) - Walt
- The Last Man (1932) - Bannister
- Vanity Street (1932) - Brian Murphy
- No Other Woman (1933) - Jim Stanley
- Song of the Eagle (1933) - Joe (Nails) Anderson
- This Day and Age (1933) - Louis Garrett
- White Woman (1933) - Ballister
- Red Wagon (1933) - Joe Prince
- Little Miss Marker (1934) - Big Steve Halloway
- A Wicked Woman (1934) - Naylor
- A Notorious Gentleman (1935) - Kirk Arlen
- Under Pressure (1935) - Nipper Moran
- The Farmer Takes a Wife (1935) - Jotham Klore
- East of Java (1935) - Red McGovern aka Harvey Bowers
- Rose of the Rancho (1936) - Joe Kincaid
- Pride of the Marines (1936) - Steve Riley
- The Plainsman (1936) - John Lattimer
- High, Wide, and Handsome (1937) - Red Scanlon
- Thunder Trail (1937) - Lee Tate
- Night Club Scandal (1937) - Det. Capt. McKinley
- Daughter of Shanghai (1937) - Otto Hartman
- Gangs of New York (1938) - 'Rocky' Thorpe / John Franklyn
- Valley of the Giants (1938) - Howard Fallon
- The Storm (1938) - Bob 'Sparks' Roberts
- Stand Up and Fight (1939) - Arnold
- Romance of the Redwoods (1939) - Steve Blake
- Street of Missing Men (1939) - Cash Darwin
- Our Leading Citizen (1939) - Shep Muir
- Mutiny in the Big House (1939) - Father Joe Collins
- One Hour to Live (1939) - Insp. Sid Brady
- Of Mice and Men (1939) - Slim
- Thou Shalt Not Kill (1939) - Rev. Chris Saunders
- Girl from God's Country (1940) - Bill Bogler
- South to Karanga (1940) - Jeff Worthing
- Queen of the Yukon (1940) - Ace Rincon
- Riders of Death Valley (1941, Serial) - Wolf Reade
- Burma Convoy (1941) - Cliff Weldon
- Reap the Wild Wind (1942) - Master of the 'Tyfib'
- Tarzan's New York Adventure (1942) - Buck Rand
- Mr. Lucky (1943) - Hard Swede
- The Song of Bernadette (1943) - Father Peyramale
- Wing and a Prayer (1944) - Capt. Waddell
- Captain Eddie (1945) - William Rickenbacker
- Fallen Angel (1945) - Mark Judd
- Duel in the Sun (1946) - Sam Pierce
- The Farmer's Daughter (1947) - Joseph Clancy
- The Woman on the Beach (1947) - Tod Butler
- Brute Force (1947) - Gallagher
- The Babe Ruth Story (1948) - Brother Matthias
- Four Faces West (1948) - Pat Garrett
- Johnny Belinda (1948) - Black MacDonald
- Command Decision (1948) - Elmer Brockhurst
- Roseanna McCoy (1949) - Devil Anse Hatfield
- Whirlpool (1950) - Lt. James Colton
- Guilty of Treason (1950) - Joszef Cardinal Mindszenty
- Riding High (1950) - J.L. Higgins
- Branded (1950) - Richard Lavery
- Jim Thorpe – All-American (1951) - Glenn S. 'Pop' Warner
- The Raging Tide (1951) - Hamil Linder
- Elopement (1951) - Tom Reagan
- The Last Posse (1953) - Sampson Drune
- A Star Is Born (1954) - Oliver Niles
- Prince of Players (1955) - Dave Prescott
- Not as a Stranger (1955) - Dr. Dave Runkleman
- The Court-Martial of Billy Mitchell (1955) - Gen. Jimmy Guthrie
- You Can't Run Away from It (1956) - A.A. Andrews
- Mister Cory (1957) - Jeremiah Des Plains 'Biloxi' Caldwell
- The Big Country (1958) - Maj. Henry Terrill
- Woman on the Run (1959, TV movie)
- Winterset (1959, TV movie) - Judge Gaunt
- The 33rd (1959, TV movie)
- The Unforgiven (1960) - Zeb Rawlins
- The Gambler, the Nun and the Radio (1960, TV movie)
- The Farmer's Daughter (1962, TV movie) - Clancy
- Days of Wine and Roses (1962) - Ellis Arnesen
- Della (1964) - Hugh Stafford
- A Big Hand for the Little Lady (1966) - Benson Tropp
- The Virginian (1966-1967) - John Grainger

=== As himself ===
- Screen Snapshots Series 9, No. 20 (1930, short)
- Screen Snapshots (1932, documentary short)
- Hollywood on Parade No. B-6 (1934, short)
- The Dark Wave (1956, documentary short)
- Now Is Tomorrow (1958, TV movie)

== See also ==
- List of actors with Academy Award nominations
