= Glynis Johns filmography and discography =

List of films featuring Glynis Johns

Glynis Johns filmography
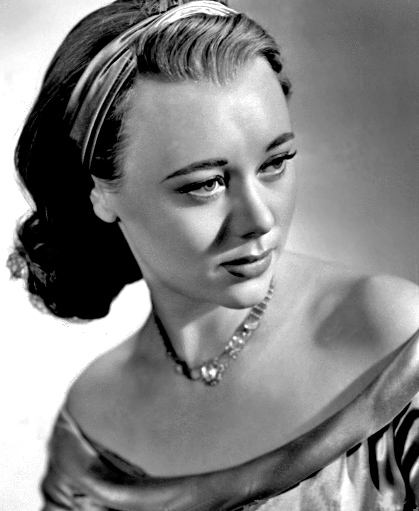
- Publicity photo of Johns in 1953
- Film: 60
- Television show: 32
- Theatre: 30

Glynis Johns was a South African-born British actress who appeared in 57 feature films, 3 short films, 32 television shows, and more than 30 plays across eight decades on screen and stage.

== Overview ==
Johns began her career performing as a child on stage. She was typecast as a stage dancer from early adolescence, making her screen debut in 1938 with the film adaptation of Winifred Holtby's posthumous novel South Riding. She rose to prominence in the 1940s following her role as Anna in the war drama film 49th Parallel (1941), for which she won a National Board of Review Award for Best Acting, and starring roles in Miranda (1948) and Third Time Lucky (1949).

Following No Highway in the Sky (1951), a joint British-American production, Johns took on increasingly more roles in America and elsewhere. She made her television and Broadway debuts in 1952 and took on starring roles in such films as The Sword and the Rose (1953), The Weak and the Wicked (1954), Mad About Men (1954), The Court Jester (1955), The Sundowners (1960), The Cabinet of Caligari (1962), The Chapman Report (1962), and Under Milk Wood (1971). On CBS, she starred in her own sitcom Glynis (1963) as the neophyte mystery writer Glynis Granvile with Keith Andes playing Glynis' husband Keith Granville.

In the 1970s and the 1980s, Johns narrated several fairy tales and other children's classics for Caedmon Records, the record label imprints of HarperCollins Publishers. Renowned for the breathy quality of her husky voice, she sang songs written specifically for her both on screen and stage, most notably "Sister Suffragette", written by the Sherman Brothers for Disney's Mary Poppins (1964), in which she played Winifred Banks and for which she won a Laurel Award for Best Female Supporting Performance, and "Send In the Clowns", composed by Stephen Sondheim for Broadway's A Little Night Music (1973), in which she originated the role of Desiree Armfeldt and for which she won a Tony Award for Best Actress in a Musical and Drama Desk Award for Outstanding Actress in a Musical.

== Filmography ==
=== Features ===
Year	Title	Role	Director	Leading man	Studio	Notes	Ref
1938	South Riding	Midge Carne	Victor Saville	Ralph Richardson	Victor Saville Productions; London Film Productions	Film debut	
1938	Murder in the Family	Marjorie Osborne	Albert Parker	Barry Jones	20th Century Fox		
1938	Prison Without Bars	Nina	Brian Desmond Hurst	Barry K. Barnes	London Film Productions		
1939	On the Night of the Fire	Mary Carr	Brian Desmond Hurst	Ralph Richardson	Greenspan & Seligman Enterprises Ltd.	U.S. title: The Fugitive	
1940	Under Your Hat	Winnie	Maurice Elvey	Jack Hulbert	Grand National Pictures		
1940	The Briggs Family	Sheila Briggs	Herbert Mason	Edward Chapman	Warner Bros.		
1940	The Thief of Bagdad	Princess' Maid	Michael Powell; Ludwig Berger; Tim Whelan	Conrad Veidt	London Films	Uncredited	
1940	The Prime Minister	Miss Sheridan	Thorold Dickinson	John Gielgud	Warner Bros. First National Pictures	Uncredited	
1941	49th Parallel	Anna	Michael Powell	Leslie Howard	Ortus Films	Won National Board of Review Awards 1942 for Best Acting	
1943	The Adventures of Tartu	Paula Palacek	Harold S. Bucquet	Robert Donat	MGM-British Studios	U.S. title: Sabotage Agent	
1944	The Halfway House	Gwyneth	Basil Dearden	Mervyn Johns	Ealing Studios		
1945	Perfect Strangers	Dizzy Clayton	Alexander Korda	Robert Donat	London Films; Metro-Goldwyn-Mayer	U.S. title: Vacation from Marriage	
1946	This Man Is Mine	Millie	Marcel Varnel	Tom Walls	Columbia British Productions		
1947	Frieda	Judy	David Farrar	Basil Dearden	Ealing Studios		
1947	An Ideal Husband	Miss Mabel Chiltern	Alexander Korda	Michael Wilding	London Film Productions		
1948	Miranda	Miranda Trewella	Ken Annakin	Griffith Jones	Gainsborough Pictures		
1949	Third Time Lucky	Joan Burns	Gordon Parry	Dermot Walsh	Gainsborough Pictures		
1949	Helter Skelter	Miranda Trewella	Ralph Thomas	David Tomlinson	Gainsborough Pictures	Uncredited	
1949	Dear Mr. Prohack	Mimi Warburton	Cecil Parker	Thornton Freeland	Wessex Film Productions		
1950	State Secret	Lisa Robinson	Sidney Gilliat	Douglas Fairbanks Jr.	London Films	U.S. title: The Great Manhunt	
1951	Flesh and Blood	Katherine	Anthony Kimmins	Richard Todd	London Films		
1951	No Highway in the Sky	Marjorie Corder	Henry Koster	James Stewart	20th Century Fox	Overseas title: No Highway in the Sky	
1951	Appointment with Venus	Nicola Fallaize	Ralph Thomas	David Niven	British Film Makers Ltd	U.S. title: Island Rescue	
1951	Encore	Stella Cotman	Pat Jackson; Anthony Pelissier; Harold French	Nigel Patrick	Two Cities Films	Segment: Gigolo and Gigolette	
1951	The Magic Box	May Jones	John Boulting	Robert Donat	Festival Film Productions		
1952	The Card	Ruth Earp	Ronald Neame	Alec Guinness	British Film-Makers	U.S. title: The Promoter	
1953	The Sword and the Rose	Princess Mary Tudor	Ken Annakin	James Robertson Justice	Walt Disney Pictures		
1953	Personal Affair	Barbara Vining	Anthony Pelissier	Leo Genn	Two Cities Films		
1953	Rob Roy, the Highland Rogue	Helen Mary MacPherson MacGregor	Harold French	Richard Todd	Walt Disney Pictures		
1954	The Weak and the Wicked	Jean Raymond	J. Lee Thompson	John Gregson	Associated British Picture Corporation	U.S. title: Young and Willing	
1954	The Seekers	Marion Southey	Ken Annakin	Jack Hawkins	Fanfare Productions	U.S. title: Land of Fury	
1954	The Beachcomber	Martha Jones	Muriel Box	Donald Sinden	London Independent Producers		
1954	Mad About Men	Caroline Trewella; Miranda Trewella	Ralph Thomas	Donald Sinden	Group Film Productions		
1955	Josephine and Men	Josephine Luton	Roy Boulting	Jack Buchanan	Charter Film Productions		
1955	The Court Jester	Maid Jean	Melvin Frank; Norman Panama	Danny Kaye	Dena Enterprises		
1956	Loser Takes All	Cary	Ken Annakin	Rossano Brazzi	Independent Film Producers; John Stafford Productions		
1956	Around the World in 80 Days	Sporting lady's companion	Michael Anderson	Cantinflas	Michael Todd Company		
1957	All Mine to Give	Jo Eunson	Allen Reisner	Cameron Mitchell	RKO Radio Pictures		
1958	Another Time, Another Place	Kay Trevor	Lewis Allen	Barry Sullivan	Lanturn Productions; Kaydor Productions Ltd.		
1959	Shake Hands with the Devil	Kitty Brady	Michael Anderson	James Cagney	Pennebaker Productions		
1960	Last of the Few	Narrator	David Millin	Leon Gluckman	Davold Enterprises		
1960	The Spider's Web	Clarissa Hailsham-Brown	Godfrey Grayson	John Justin	Danziger Productions		
1960	The Sundowners	Mrs. Firth	Fred Zinnemann	Robert Mitchum	Warner Bros.	Nominated for Academy Award for Best Supporting Actress	
1962	The Cabinet of Caligari	Jane Lindstrom	Roger Kay	Dan O'Herlihy	Twentieth Century Fox; Associated Producers (API); Robert L. Lippert Productions		
1962	The Chapman Report	Teresa Harnish	George Cukor	Efrem Zimbalist Jr	Darryl F. Zanuck Productions	Nominated for Golden Globe Award for Best Actress in a Motion Picture – Drama	
1963	Papa's Delicate Condition	Amberlyn Griffith	George Marshall	Jackie Gleason	Amro Productions		
1964	Mary Poppins	Winifred Banks	Robert Stevenson	Dick Van Dyke	Walt Disney Productions		
1965	Dear Brigitte	Vina Leaf	Henry Koster	James Stewart	A Fred Kohlmar Production; 20th Century Fox		
1968	Don't Just Stand There!	Sabine Manning	Ron Winston	Robert Wagner	Universal Pictures		
1969	Lock Up Your Daughters!	Mrs. Squeezum	Peter Coe	Christopher Plummer	Domino Films		
1971	Under Milk Wood	Myfanwy Price	Andrew Sinclair	Richard Burton	Timon Films		
1973	The Vault of Horror	Eleanor	Roy Ward Baker	Terry-Thomas	Amicus Productions; Metromedia Producers Corporation	Segment: The Neat Job	
1987	Nukie	Sister Anne	Sias Odendaal; Michael Pakleppa	Anthony Morrison	Lars International Pictures		
1988	Zelly and Me	Co-Co	Tina Rathborne	David Lynch	Columbia Pictures; Cypress Films (II); Mark/Jett Productions		
1994	The Ref	Rose	Ted Demme	Denis Leary	Touchstone Pictures; Don Simpson; Jerry Bruckheimer Films		
1995	While You Were Sleeping	Elsie	Jon Turteltaub	Bill Pullman	Hollywood Pictures; Caravan Pictures		
1999	Superstar	Grandma	Bruce McCulloch	Will Ferrell	SNL Studios	Final film role	

=== Short subjects ===
Year	Title	Role	Director	Leading man	Studio	Notes	Ref
1974	The Happy Prince	Swallow	Michael Mills	Christopher Plummer	Potterton Productions; Reader's Digest	Voice	
1977	Three Dangerous Ladies	Mrs. Amworth	Alvin Rakoff; Don Thompson; Robert Fuest	John Phillips	Highgate Pictures	Segment: Mrs. Amworth	
1978	Mrs. Amworth	Mrs. Amworth	Alvin Rakoff	Derek Francis	HTV West; Highgate Associates; Ontario Educational Communications Authority (OECA)		

=== Television ===
Year	Title	Role	Director	Leading man	Network	Notes	Ref
1952	Little Women	Lily Snape	Franklin J. Schaffner	Paul Branson	CBS Television Network	Original title: Studio One	
1953	Lux Video Theatre	—	Fielder Cook	Brian Aherne	J. Walter Thompson Agency		
1956	The Errol Flynn Theatre	Lou McNamara; Susan Tracey	Lawrence Huntington	Errol Flynn	Motley Films; Official Films	2 episodes	
1958	Schlitz Playhouse of Stars	—	Jules Bricken	William Bishop	Revue Studios	Episode: The Dead Are Silent	
1958	The Frank Sinatra Show	Christine Nolan	—	Frank Sinatra	Hobart Productions	Episode: Face of Fear	
1961	Adventures in Paradise	Esther Holmes	Felix E. Feist	Gardner McKay	Martin Manulis Productions; Jaymar Productions; 20th Century Fox Television		
1961	The Roaring 20's	Kitty O'Moyne	Charles R. Rondeau	Donald May	Warner Bros. Television		
1961	General Electric Theater	Alma	—	Shelley Berman	Revue Studios		
1961	The Naked City	Miss Arlington	Paul Wendkos	Paul Burke	Shelle Productions; Screen Gems		
1962	The Dick Powell Show	Rosie Sayer	David Friedkin	James Coburn	Four Star Productions		
1962	Dr. Kildare	Sister Brigid Marie	Robert Butler	Richard Chamberlain	Arena Productions; MGM Television		
1962	The Beachcomber	Rosalind Metcalf	Tay Garnett	Cameron Mitchell	Everglade Productions	Episode: The Search for Robert Herrick	
1962	Saints and Sinners	Lois Hawley	Richard Benedict	Nick Adams	Four Star Productions; Hondo		
1963	The DuPont Show of the Week	Emily Foster	Franklin J. Schaffner	Eddie Albert	—		
1963	The Lloyd Bridges Show	Leah Marquand	Don Siegel	Lloyd Bridges	Four Star Productions; Loring-Caron		
1963	Vacation Playhouse	Glynis Granville	Sherman Marks	Keith Andes	Desilu Productions		
1963	Glynis	Glynis Granville	E. W. Swackhamer	Keith Andes	Desilu Productions; Esco Productions	13 episodes	
1964	Burke's Law	Steffi Bernard	Don Taylor	Gene Barry	Four Star Productions; Barbety Production		
1964	The Defenders	Catherine Collins	David Greene	E. G. Marshall	Plautus Productions; Defender Productions; CBS Television Network		
1964	12 O'clock High	Jennifer Heath	Don Medford	Robert Lansing	20th Century Fox Television; Quinn Martin Productions (QM)		
1967	Batman	Lady Penelope Peasoup	Oscar Rudolph	Adam West	Greenway Productions; 20th Century Fox Television	4 episodes	
1968	ITV Playhouse	Lorraine Barrie	Guy Verney	Robert Hardy	Associated-Rediffusion Television; Thames Television	Episode: Star Quality	
1982	Little Gloria... Happy at Last	Laura Fitzpatrick Morgan	Waris Hussein	Christopher Plummer	—	Television mini series	
1983	Cheers	Mrs. Helen Chambers	James Burrows	Ted Danson	Charles/Burrows/Charles Productions; Paramount Television		
1984	The Love Boat	Edna Miles	Richard Kinon	Gavin MacLeod	Aaron Spelling Productions; Douglas S. Cramer Company; The Love Boat Company		
1984	Spraggue	Aunt Mary	Larry Elikann	Michael Nouri	Lorimar Productions; MF Productions	Television film	
1984	The Crime of Ovide Plouffe	—	Denys Arcand; Gilles Carle	Donald Pilon	—	Television mini series	
1985	Murder, She Wrote	Bridget O'Hara	John Llewellyn Moxey	Barrie Ingham	Universal Television	Episode: Sing a Song of Murder	
1987	The Cavanaughs	Maureen	Andrew D. Weyman	Barnard Hughes	Paramount Television	Episode: The Eyes Have Had It	
1988	Scooby-Doo and the Ghoul School	Mrs. Grimwood	Charles Nichols; Ray Patterson	Remy Auberjonois	Hanna-Barbera Productions; Taft Broadcasting	Voice; Television film	
1988–89	Coming of Age	Trudie Pepper	Tony Mordente	Paul Dooley	—	15 episodes	
1994	ABC Weekend Specials	Darjeeling	Dave Edwards	Derek Jacobi	Mike Young Productions; Greengrass Productions; DIC Entertainment	Television short	

== Stage appearances ==
Year	Title	Role	Director	Leading man	Theatre	Notes	Ref
1931	Judgement Day	Sonia Kuman	Ronald Adam	Lewis Casson	Phoenix Theatre		
1935	Buckie's Bears	Ursula	—	Harold Reese	Garrick Theatre		
1936	St Helena	Hortense	Henry Cass	Eric Wynn Owen	The Old Vic		
1936	The Children's Hour	Mary Tilford	Norman Marshall; Reginald Beekwith	Leo Genn	Gate Theatre		
1936	The Melody That Got Lost	Elf	—	—	Embassy Theatre		
1937	Judgement Day	Sonia Kuman	—	Douglas Jefferies	Strand Theatre		
1937	A Kiss for Cinderella	Cinderella	—	Sebastian Shaw	Phoenix Theatre		
1938	Quiet Wedding	Miranda Bute	Marjorie Morris	George Thorpe	Wyndham's Theatre		
1941	Quiet Weekend	Miranda Bute	Richard Bird	Frank Cellier	Wyndham's Theatre		
1943	Peter Pan	Peter Pan	—	Baliol Holloway	Cambridge Theatre		
1944	I'll See You Again	Corinne	Joyce Carey	Hugh Sinclair	Manchester Opera House		
1946	Fools Rush In	Pam	—	Derek Farr	Fortune Theatre		
1950	The Way Things Go	Mary Flemin	Anthony Pelissier	Ronald Squire	Phoenix Theatre		
1952	Gertie	Gertie	Herman Shumlin	Albert Dekker	Plymouth Theatre		
1956	Major Barbara	Barbara Undershaft	Charles Laughton	Charles Laughton	Martin Beck Theatre		
1963	Too True to Be Good	Miss Mopply	Albert Marre	Cedric Hardwicke	54th Street Theatre		
1966	The King's Mare	Anne of Cleves	Peter Coe	Blake Butler	Garrick Theatre		
1969	A Talent to Amuse	—	Nigel Patrick; Douglas Squires; Wendy Toye	Patrick Allen	Phoenix Theatre		
1969–70	Come As You Are	Queen Elizabeth I	Allan Davis	Denholm Elliott	New Theatre		
1972	The Marquise	Marquise-Thérèse de Gorla	Roger Redfarn	Brian Badcoe	Bristol Hippodrome		
1973	A Little Night Music	Desiree Armfeldt	Harold Prince	Len Cariou	Sam S. Shubert Theatre; Majestic Theatre	Won Tony Award for Best Actress in a Musical and Drama Desk Award for Outstanding Actress in a Musical	
1973	Sondheim: A Musical Tribute	—	Burt Shevelove	George Lee Andrews	Sam S. Shubert Theatre		
1975	Ring Round the Moon	Madame Desmortes	Joseph Hardy	Michael York	Ahmanson Theatre		
1976	13 Rue de l'Amour	Leontine	Peter Dews	Robert Vowles	Phoenix Theatre		
1978	Cause célèbre	Alma Rattenbury	Robin Midgley	—	Her Majesty's Theatre	Won Best Actress Award, Variety Club and nominated for Laurence Olivier Award for Actress of the Year in a New Play	
1980–81	Hay Fever	Judith Bliss	Michael Blakemore	John Le Mesurier	Yvonne Arnaud Theatre		
1984	The Boy Friend	Madame Dubonnet	Sandy Wilson	John Griffiths	Churchill Theatre		
1989–90	The Circle	Lady Catherine Champion-Cheney	Brian Murray	Robin Chadwick	Ambassador Theatre		
1991	A Little Night Music	Madame Armfeldt	Gordon Davidson	Franc D'Ambrosio	Ricardo Montalbán Theatre		
1998	A Coffin in Egypt	Myrtle Bledsoe	Leonard Foglia	—	Bay Street Theatre		

== Radio appearances ==
Year	Title	Role	Presenter	Leading man	Station	Episode	Ref
1976	Desert Island Discs	—	Roy Plomley	—	BBC Radio 4	Glynis Johns	

== Discography ==
Year	Album	Role	Producer	Label	Song	Notes	Ref
1950	State Secret	Lisa Robinson	Sidney Gilliat; Frank Launder	—	"Paper Doll"		
1954	Mad About Men	Miranda Trewella	Betty E. Box; Earl St. John	Columbia	"Always You" "I Can't Resist Men"		
1960	The Sundowners	Mrs. Firth	Gerry Blattner	—	"Botany Bay"		
1973	Mary Poppins: Original Cast Soundtrack	Winifred Banks	Evelyn Kennedy; Jimmy Johnson	His Master's Voice	"Sister Suffragette" "Let's Go Fly a Kite"		
1972	The Story Of Peter Pan	Narrator & Reader	—	Caedmon Records	—		
1973	Snow-White And Rose-Red And Other Andrew Lang Fairy Tales	Narrator & Reader	—	Caedmon Records	—		
1973	Bambi	Narrator & Reader	—	Caedmon Records	—		
1973	A Little Night Music (Original Broadway Cast Album)	Desiree Armfeldt	Thomas Z. Shepard; Goddard Lieberson; Ruth Mitchell	Columbia Masterworks	"The Glamorous Life" "You Must Meet My Wife" "Send in the Clowns"		
1973	The Tonight Show Starring Johnny Carson	Desiree Armfeldt	Frederick De Cordova	—	"Send in the Clowns"	Episode: 10 May 1973	
1981	The Light Princess	Narrator & Reader	—	Caedmon Records	—		
1984	Bargain for Frances and Other Frances Stories	Narrator & Reader	—	Caedmon Records	—		
1985	Great Performances	Desiree Armfeldt	Iris Merlis; Deborah Oppenheimer	—	"Send in the Clowns"	Episode: The Best of Broadway	
2000	Broadway Super Hits, Vol. 2	Desiree Armfeldt	—	—	"Send in the Clowns"		
2008	The Story So Far...	Desiree Armfeldt	—	—	"Send in the Clowns"		
2018	Diminishing returns	Winifred Banks	Sol Harris; Allen Turing		"Sister Suffragette"	Episode: Mary Poppins	
