= Martin Boddey =

British actor (1907–1975)

- In Personal Affair (1953)
- Born: Albert Martin Boddey; 16 April 1907; Stirling, Stirlingshire, Scotland
- Died: 24 October 1975 (aged 68); London, England
- Years active: 1948–1975

Albert Martin Boddey (16 April 1907 – 24 October 1975) was a British film and television actor.

Boddey started acting when he was nearly 40, often portraying irritable authority figures such as police officers or magistrates.

He was a founder member of the Lord's Taverners charity.

== Selected filmography ==
- A Song for Tomorrow (1948) – Major
- The Third Man (1949) – Russian Military Policeman (uncredited)
- Landfall (1949) – Civilian (uncredited)
- The Twenty Questions Murder Mystery (1950) – 2nd Plainclothesman (uncredited)
- Cairo Road (1950) – Maj. Ahmed Mustafa
- State Secret (1950) – Clubman
- The Dancing Years (1950) – Minor Role (uncredited)
- Seven Days to Noon (1950) – Gen. Willoughby
- Cage of Gold (1950) – Adams
- The Franchise Affair (1951) – Insp. Hallam
- The Adventurers (1951) – Chief Engineer
- Laughter in Paradise (1951) – Store Shopwalker
- Cloudburst (1951) – Desk Sergeant
- Valley of Eagles (1951) – Chief of the Lost Valley
- Appointment with Venus (1951) – Sgt. Vogel
- The Magic Box (1951) – Sitter in Bath Studio
- Venetian Bird (1952) – Gufo
- Top Secret (1952) – Russian Security Officer
- Folly to Be Wise (1953) – Visiting Brigadier (uncredited)
- Sailor of the King (1953) – German Officer (uncredited)
- Park Plaza 605 (1953) – Stumpy
- Personal Affair (1953) – Police Insp. Fred Garland (uncredited)
- Rob Roy, the Highland Rogue (1953) – General Cadogan
- Face the Music (1954) – Insp. Mulrooney
- Doctor in the House (1954) – Demonstrator at pedal machine
- Forbidden Cargo (1954) – Sub-Director Holt
- Seagulls Over Sorrento (1954) – Member of Admiralty Board (uncredited)
- Mad About Men (1954) – Marco (uncredited)
- Svengali (1954) – Doctor
- Up to His Neck (1955) – Chang
- Secret Venture (1955) – Squire Marlowe, the Wrestler
- The Iron Petticoat (1956) – Grisha
- The Last Man to Hang? (1956) – Detective Sgt. Horne
- Eyewitness (1956) – Police Sgt. (uncredited)
- The Silken Affair (1956) – Detective
- You Can't Escape (1956) – Insp. Crane
- There's Always a Thursday (1957) – Sergeant
- How to Murder a Rich Uncle (1957) – Police Sergeant
- These Dangerous Years (1957)
- Man in the Shadow (1957) – Doctor (uncredited)
- Cat Girl (1957) – Cafferty
- Not Wanted on Voyage (1957) – Captain
- The Duke Wore Jeans (1958)
- No Time to Die (1958) – SS colonel
- Indiscreet (1958) – Albert (uncredited)
- Carry On Sergeant (1958) – Sixth Specialist
- Chain of Events (1958) – Bus Inspector
- The Adventures of Hal 5 (1958) – Doctor
- I Only Arsked! (1958) – (uncredited)
- The Two-Headed Spy (1958) – Gen. Optiz
- The Square Peg (1958) – (uncredited)
- Violent Moment (1959) – Nightwatchman (uncredited)
- Carry On Nurse (1959) – Perkins
- Idol on Parade (1959) – Chucker-out (uncredited)
- The Siege of Pinchgut (1959) – Brigadier
- I'm All Right Jack (1959) – Num Yum's Executive
- Killers of Kilimanjaro (1959) – Gunther
- Moment of Danger (1960) – Sir John Middleburgh
- Too Hot to Handle (1960) – Mr. Arpels
- Oscar Wilde (1960) – Insp. Richards
- Sands of the Desert (1960) – Mertons
- Circle of Deception (1960) – Henry Crow
- The Naked Edge (1961) – Jason Roote
- The Kitchen (1961) – Max
- The Wrong Arm of the Law (1963) – Superintendent J.S. Forest
- Girl in the Headlines (1963) – Inspector
- The Man Who Finally Died (1963) – Policeman with Dog (uncredited)
- A Man for All Seasons (1966) – Governor of Tower
- Bedazzled (1967) – Cardinal (uncredited)
- The Rise and Rise of Michael Rimmer (1970) – Major Mathieson
- Tales from the Crypt (1972) – Husband – Richard Clayton (segment 1 "And All Through The House")
- Dark Places (1973) – Sgt. Riley
- Psychomania (1973) – Coroner
- The Naked Civil Servant (1975) – Magistrate (final film role)
