= Glynis Johns =

British actress (1923–2024)

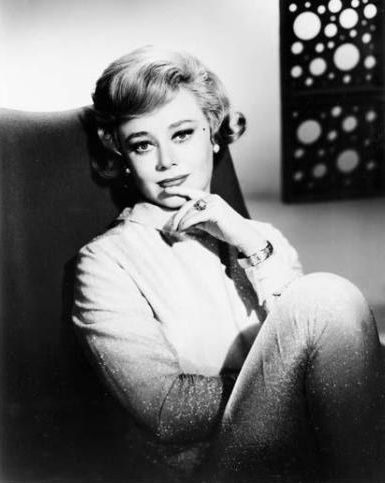
- Publicity photo, 1950s
- Born: Glynis Margaret Payne Johns; 5 October 1923; Pretoria, Gauteng, Union of South Africa
- Died: 4 January 2024 (aged 100); Los Angeles, California, U.S.
- Resting place: Burry Port, Wales
- Citizenship: United Kingdom; Union of South Africa; United States (Note: Johns was a British subject of the Crown via the legal doctrine of jus sanguinis and also of South Africa via the doctrine of jus soli. She became a naturalised U.S. citizen after emigrating to the U.S. in the mid-1950s, keeping her British and South African citizenship.)
- Occupations: Actress; dancer; singer
- Years active: 1923–1999
- Works: Full list
- Spouses: Anthony Forwood (m. 1942; div. 1948) David Foster (m. 1952; div. 1956) Cecil Henderson (m. 1960; div. 1962) Elliott Arnold (m. 1964; div. 1973)
- Children: Gareth Forwood
- Father: Mervyn Johns
- Relatives: Diana Churchill (stepmother); John Geoffrey Jones (cousin)

Glynis Margaret Payne Johns (5 October 1923 – 4 January 2024) was a British actress and singer. In a career exceeding seven decades on stage and screen, Johns appeared in more than 60 films and 30 plays. She received various accolades throughout her career, including a Tony Award and a Drama Desk Award, as well as nominations for an Academy Award, a Golden Globe Award and a Laurence Olivier Award. Before her death at age 100, she was considered one of the last surviving stars from the Golden Age of Hollywood and classical years of British cinema.

Johns was born in Pretoria, then in the Union of South Africa, the daughter of Welsh actor Mervyn Johns. Raised in England from an early age, she appeared on stage from a young age and was typecast as a stage dancer from early adolescence, making her screen debut in South Riding (1938). She rose to prominence in the 1940s following her role as Anna in the war drama film 49th Parallel (1941), for which she won a National Board of Review Award for Best Acting, and starring roles in Miranda (1948) and Third Time Lucky (1949). Following No Highway in the Sky (1951), a joint British-American production, Johns took on increasingly more roles in the United States and elsewhere. She made her television and Broadway debuts in 1952 and took on starring roles in such films as The Sword and the Rose (1953), The Weak and the Wicked (1954), Mad About Men (1954), The Court Jester (1955), The Sundowners (1960), The Cabinet of Caligari (1962), The Chapman Report (1962), and Under Milk Wood (1971). On television, she starred in her own sitcom Glynis (1963).

Renowned for the breathy quality of her husky voice, Johns sang songs written specifically for her both on screen and stage, most notably "Sister Suffragette", written by the Sherman Brothers for Disney's Mary Poppins (1964), in which she played Winifred Banks and for which she received a Laurel Award, and "Send In the Clowns", composed by Stephen Sondheim for Broadway's A Little Night Music (1973), in which she originated the role of Desiree Armfeldt and for which she received a Tony Award and Drama Desk Award.

== Early life and education ==
There were situations that were hard for parents to turn down. It's difficult to turn down a chance to star with Laurence Olivier, to say, 'No, she has to go to school'. They had a big decision to make ... I was interested in everything. I wanted to be a scientist. I would've loved to go on and on at university. But you can't do everything in life.

— Glynis Johns
Los Angeles Times, 17 April 1991

Johns was born while her parents were touring Pretoria, capital of the then Union of South Africa (a dominion of the British Empire and later the British Commonwealth of Nations). Her mother was Alyce Steele-Wareham, an Australian-born concert pianist of English descent who had studied in London and Vienna. Her father was Welsh actor Mervyn Johns, who became a star of British films during the Second World War, after which he worked regularly as a character actor at Ealing Studios. Through him, Johns was a cousin of British judge John Geoffrey Jones. She was given the middle names Margaret and Payne after her two grandmothers, her paternal grandmother Margaret Anne Samuel and her maternal grandmother Elizabeth Steele-Payne, the latter's family having formed the musical ensemble The Steele-Payne Bellringers in which she performed as one of the first women virtuoso violinists.

Johns' parents met while both were studying in London, he at the Royal Academy of Dramatic Art and she at the Royal Academy of Music. They married on 17 November 1922 in St Giles, London, after which they left to tour the British dominions with her family's theatre company. The family returned to England just a few months after she was born. Age five, she joined the London Ballet School; by six, she was hailed in Britain as a dancing wonder; by ten, she was working as a Ballet instructor; and by eleven, she had earned a degree to teach dance. Hoping to study with the Sadler's Wells Ballet at age twelve, she was enrolled instead at Clifton High School in Bristol, balancing academia with the two hours a day she spent at the Cone School of Dancing (which later merged with the Ripman School to form Tring Park School for the Performing Arts). As a dance student, Johns amassed some twenty-five gold medals. Aside from her Clifton education, she also attended South Hampstead High School in London, where she was a contemporary of Angela Lansbury.

== Career ==
=== 1923–1939: Career beginnings ===
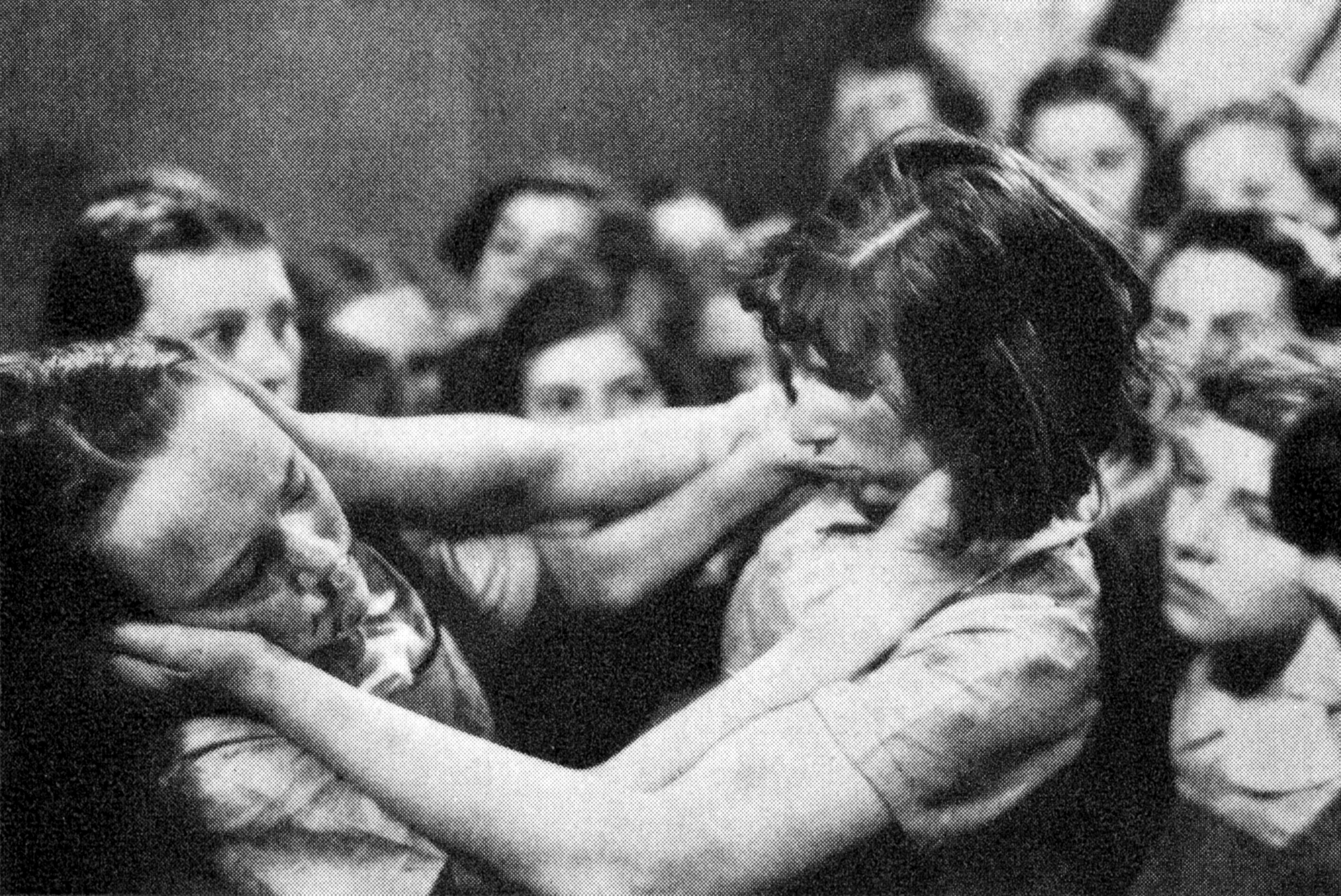
Promotional photograph for South Riding (1938), showing a fight at school between Midge Carne (14-year-old Johns, on the left) and Lydia Holly (Joan Ellum)

Johns made her theatrical debut in October 1923 at just three weeks old when she was carried onto the London stage by her grandmother Elizabeth Steele-Payne, a violinist-impresario who had inherited the production's company from her father. She thus became the fourth generation in her mother's family to appear on stage.

In 1931 at the age of eight, Johns was cast as Sonia Kuman in Elmer Rice's Judgement Day at the Phoenix Theatre in London. She played alongside theatre actors Sir Lewis Casson, Ronald Adam, and George Woodbridge, who played Judge Vlora, Judge Tsankov, and Judge Sturdza, respectively. As a child ballerina in 1935, Johns played Ursula in Buckie's Bears; this production lasted from 27 December 1935 to 11 January 1936 at the Garrick Theatre. Her proficiency in dance led her to be cast in several children's plays throughout the 1930s, notably during the Christmas holidays. She was spotted by a manager and subsequently cast in her first major stage production, as Napoleon's daughter in the 1936 short play St Helena at The Old Vic; she was in productions of The Children's Hour and The Melody That Got Lost the same year. Following this, she was recast as Sonia Kuman in Elmer Rice's 1937 production of Judgement Day (this time at London's Strand Theatre), J. M. Barrie's 1937 play A Kiss for Cinderella, and Esther McCracken's 1938 play Quiet Wedding, in which she played the bridesmaid Miranda Bute at Wyndham's Theatre, London.

Johns made her screen debut in 1938 at the age of 14 with the eponymous film adaptation of Winifred Holtby's novel South Riding, produced by Alexander Korda and directed by Victor Saville, in which she played Midge Carne, the daughter of aspiring politician Robert Carne (played by Ralph Richardson). She had small roles in David Evans' 1938 crime film Murder in the Family and two Brian Desmond Hurst films – his 1938 black-and-white crime film Prison Without Bars and 1939 thriller On the Night of the Fire (in which she was again cast alongside Ralph Richardson).

=== 1940–1949: British film and theatre ===
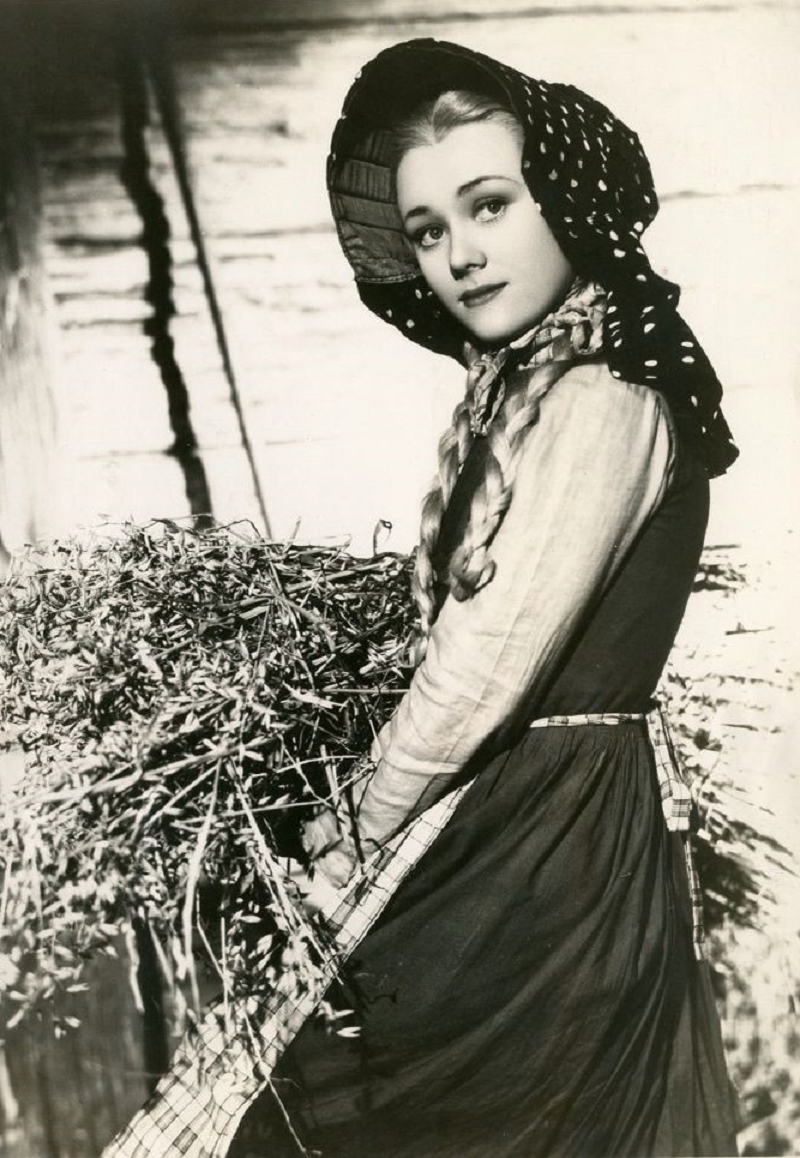
Publicity photo for 49th Parallel (1941)

Johns averaged one and a half films a year throughout the 1940s, starting in 1940 with Under Your Hat, in which she played Winnie, a supporting character to Jack Hulbert's Jack Millett and Cicely Courtneidge's Kay Millett in this musical comedy spy film. Johns' scene in the 1941 British historical drama The Prime Minister as Miss Sheridan did not make the final cut, though her role in the 1941 British and Canadian World War II drama film 49th Parallel, in which she replaced Elisabeth Bergner as Anna, earned her a National Board of Review Award for Best Acting and international acclaim. She continued with supporting roles as Romanian resistance fighter Paula Palacek in the 1943 British spy film, The Adventures of Tartu; supernatural innkeeper Gwyneth (alongside her father Mervyn Johns' Rhys) in the 1944 British drama film, The Halfway House; and the fun-loving cousin of Deborah Kerr's Dizzy Clayton in the 1945 British drama film, Perfect Strangers, in which she was part of a very talented cast including Roger Moore, and for which Radio Times' Robyn Karney said she was "excellent". In a starring role, Johns played Millie in the 1946 British comedy film This Man Is Mine and war widow Judy in the 1947 British drama film Frieda. David Parkinson noted that Johns "seemed to epitomise modern British womanhood". Conversely, she was cast as Mabel Chiltern in An Ideal Husband (1947), Alexander Korda's adaptation of the 1895 play by Oscar Wilde, in which Johns helps Lord Arthur Goring (Michael Wilding) prevent Laura Cheveley (Paulette Goddard) from destroying the reputation of her politician brother, Sir Robert Chilton (Hugh Williams).

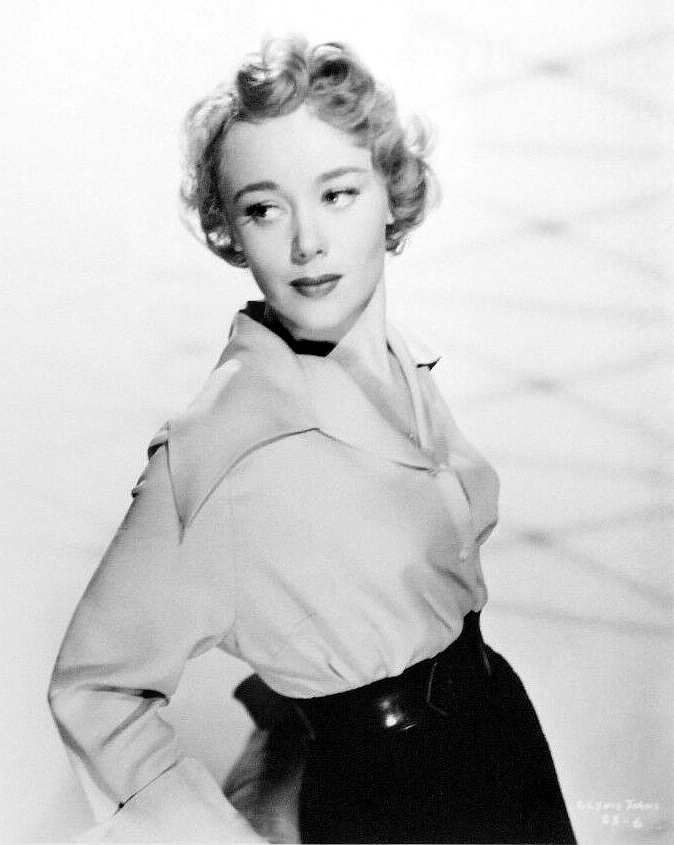
Publicity photo of Johns in 1951

For her role as playful Cornish mermaid Miranda Trewella in Ken Annakin's 1948 black and white comedy film Miranda, in which she causes havoc in a London household, David L. Vineyard on MysteryFile wrote, "Johns is a revelation: long platinum hair, Khirghiz eyes, and that breathless voice, perfect for this sexy romp," and ScreenOnline's Matthew Coniam wrote, "Miranda ... is played ideally by Glynis Johns ... a strikingly unusual actress facially reminiscent of Gloria Grahame, with a melodic, purring voice." As Miranda, Johns wore a tail made specially by The Dunlop Rubber Company and commissioned by producer Betty Box. The cast also included Griffith Jones, Googie Withers, and David Tomlinson, with whom Johns was later reunited in The Magic Box (1951) and Mary Poppins (1964). Given the weight of her tail, Tomlinson recalled his alarm at having to carry her around. The following year, she had a brief cameo in Helter Skelter, a gleefully scattershot comedy in which she again played the flirtatious mermaid Miranda.

Johns starred in two more films that year. She was cast in Thornton Freeland's comedy Dear Mr. Prohack, a modern version of Arnold Bennett's 1922 novel, Mr Prohack, as adapted in the play by Edward Knoblock. In it, Johns plays Mimi Warburton, the private secretary and love interest of Charles Prohack, played by Dirk Bogarde. That same year, Bogarde began a relationship with Johns' ex-husband Anthony Forwood. The cast included "a winning gallery of femmes fatales". About Johns playing a character very unlike herself, author John Reid wrote, "Glynis Johns ... is so much better at playing a scheming minx than an honest woman." In Third Time Lucky (1949), she played Joan Burns, a "capable femme fatale". Of this role, Fint on Letterboxd wrote, "Glynis is as winningly winsome as ever, her husky tones approximating a British Jean Arthur."

On stage, Johns reprised her role as Miranda Bute in Richard Bird's play Quiet Weekend, which ran from 22 July 1941 to 29 January 1944 at Wyndham's Theatre in London. During the Blitz, she was recast in Judgement Day, which she played at the Phoenix Theatre in London despite the dangers posed by German bombers. Following this, she appeared in Peter Pan at the Cambridge Theatre in 1943, I'll See You Again in 1944, and Fools Rush In in 1946.

=== 1950–1959: Established actor ===
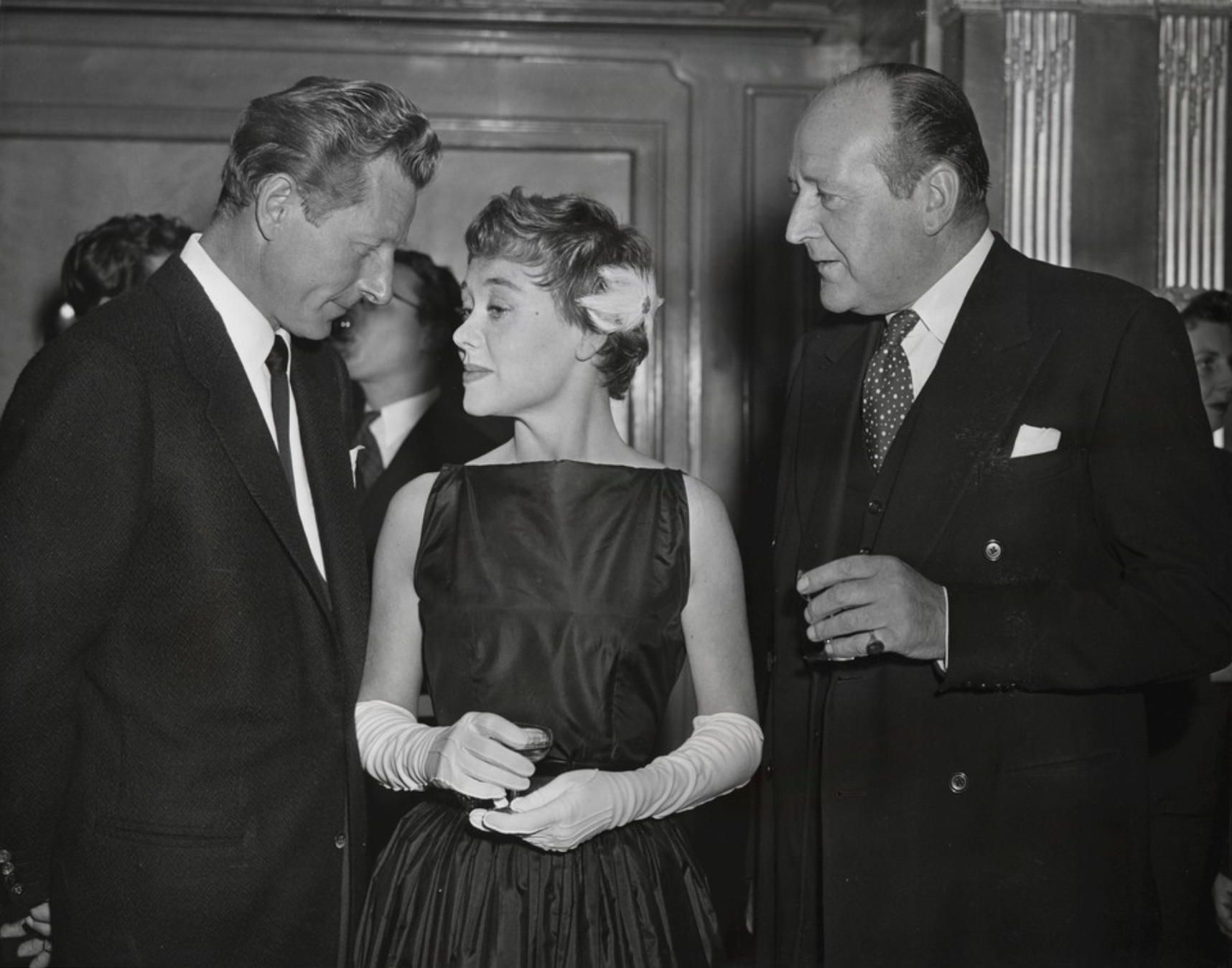
Johns with Danny Kaye and Cecil Parker in 1955

In the 1950s, Johns enjoyed more film roles than any earlier decade. Her successes in Miranda (1948), Third Time Lucky (1949) and in other movies made her a household name, both in Britain and the United States; director Ken Annakin was an early admirer of her work.

Johns remained in "noir territory" with Sidney Gilliat's 1950 drama thriller film State Secret, appearing alongside Douglas Fairbanks Jr. and Jack Hawkins; as Lisa Robinson, she was Fairbanks's love interest; the two cause havoc in a fictitious Eastern European country and ultimately flee to the U.S. to start their new life together. Johns supported Richard Todd in Flesh and Blood the following year and having previously declined parts in Hollywood productions, because of her loving devotion to British cinema, appeared in the Hollywood-financed No Highway in the Sky, in which an expert's misgivings about a plane's air-worthiness are ignored. As unflappable stewardess Marjorie Corder, Johns appeared alongside James Stewart and Marlene Dietrich in this Henry Koster adaptation of the Nevil Shute novel No Highway. Following this, she co-starred with David Niven in Appointment with Venus (1951) for director Ralph Thomas, which recreates a wartime mission to rescue a pedigree cow from the Nazi-occupied island of Amorel and in which Johns plays Channel-Islander Nicola Fallaize. She was one of several names in the 1951 anthology film Encore, appearing as gambler Stella Cotman, who visits Monte Carlo alongside Terence Morgan's Syd Cotman in the segment "Gigolo and Gigolette". Now very much in demand, Johns guest starred as May Jones in John Boulting's Technicolour biographical drama film The Magic Box of the same year. As May, Johns is introduced to cinema pioneer Robert Donat's William Friese-Greene by Richard Attenborough's Jack Carter. In The Card (1952), a "droll" adaptation of Arnold Bennett's eponymous novel, she was Alec Guinness' main love interest, dance teacher Ruth Earp, about which The New York Times' Bosley Crowther wrote, "Miss Johns' self-propelling young lady is a bundle of feminine guile."

Johns made her television debut in 1952 with Fletcher Markle's Emmy Award-winning series Little Women. She appeared in just one episode: season four's "Lilly, the Queen of the Movies" as Lily Snape. Her television credits of the 1950s include brief appearances in the Hollywood anthology series Lux Video Theatre (in the 1953 episode "Two For Tea"), Errol Flynn's anthology series The Errol Flynn Theatre (in the 1956 episodes "The Sealed Room" as Lou McNamara, and "The Girl in Blue Jeans" as the Girl - Susan Tracey), CBS's anthology series Schlitz Playhouse of Stars (in the 1957 episode "The Dead Are Silent"), and ABC's variety and drama series The Frank Sinatra Show (in the 1958 episode "Face of Fear" as Christine Nolan).

Johns was reunited with Richard Todd for two swashbucklers made for Walt Disney: The Sword and the Rose (1953), directed by Ken Annakin, and Rob Roy, the Highland Rogue (1953). At the same time, she made Personal Affair, a British drama film starring Gene Tierney and directed by Anthony Pelissier, in which Johns plays teenager Barbara Vining, who pursues her Latin teacher, Leo Genn's Kay Barlow. The following year, Johns had the starring role in J. Lee Thompson's drama film The Weak and the Wicked alongside Diana Dors and Rachel Roberts, playing an upper-class prisoner, Jean Raymond, who was framed by her friend and for which Johns was widely praised. Johns did another for Annakin, The Seekers (1954), then co-starred with Robert Newton in The Beachcomber (1954). She played the Christian missionary in both films, appearing respectively as Marion Southey, the fiancé to Jack Hawkins' Philip Wayne who seeks to establish Christianity in 19th century New Zealand, and Martha Jones, who seeks to introduce it to the Welcome Islands. For both, she was paid £12,500 a picture.

In 1954, Johns was one of five judges to oversee the finals of the National Bathing Beauty Contest in Morecambe, England, where Pat Butler was declared the winner. Sitting beside newspaper editor Charles Eade, Johns was the youngest and only woman judge.

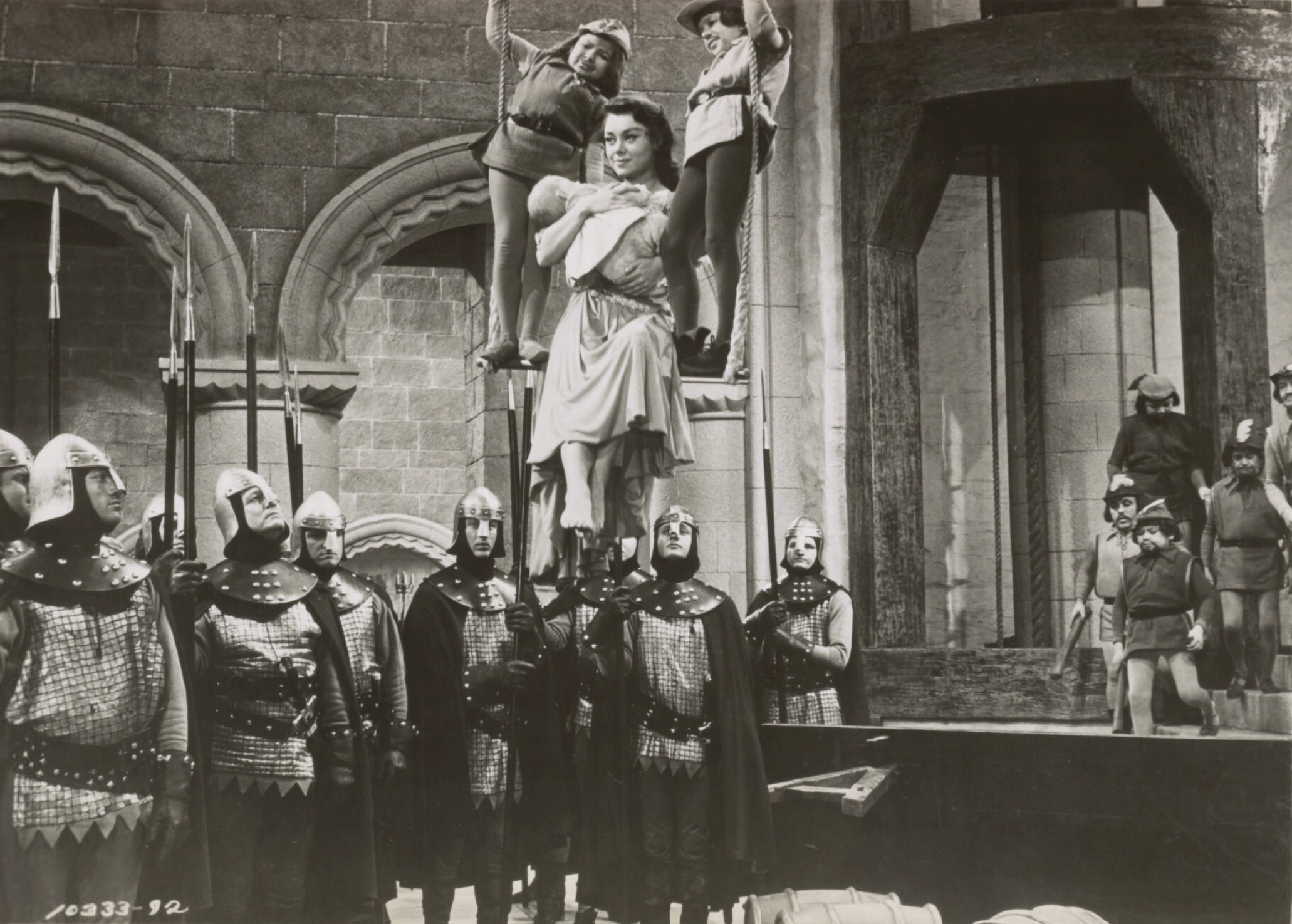
Johns with baby in The Court Jester (1955)

Ralph Thomas's 1954 Technicolor comedy film Mad About Men starred Johns alongside actors Donald Sinden and Anne Crawford in this sequel to Miranda. Johns starred as Jo Luton in Roy Boulting's 1955 comedy Josephine and Men, a romantic comedy film in which Jack Buchanan's Uncle Charles Luton examines his niece's relationships, and supported Danny Kaye in the musical-comedy medieval romance costume drama film The Court Jester of the same year, playing Jean with "cunning precision". Despite having the highest budget of any comedy made at the time, The Court Jester was badly received at the box office. When the episode "Doctor's Orders" of Star Trek: Enterprise aired in 2004, Johns made a surprise guest appearance when a clip of The Court Jester was shown on screen.

Annakin used Johns again in Loser Takes All (1956), in which she plays a newlywed who loses patience with her gambling husband played by Rossano Brazzi, She was one of the many actors who made cameos in Around the World in 80 Days (1956), appearing alongside Hermione Gingold in the closing scenes. Alongside Cameron Mitchell, Johns starred in the 1957 Technicolor melodrama film All Mine to Give, based on the novel by Dale Eunson and his wife Katherine Albert. Johns returned to Britain to make Another Time, Another Place (1958) with Lana Turner and starred as Kitty Brady in Shake Hands with the Devil (1959).

In the West End, Johns starred in two 1950 productions: Fools Rush In at the Fortune Theatre and The Way Things Go at the Phoenix Theatre. She made her Broadway debut in 1952 when given the title role in five productions of the Enid Bagnold comedy Gertie. Johns returned to the United States in 1956 to again play the title role, this time in a Broadway revival production of George Bernard Shaw's Major Barbara.

=== 1960–1969: Mary Poppins and other roles ===
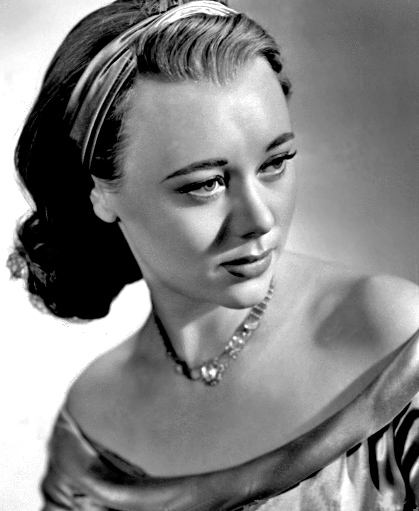
Johns in 1953

In 1960, Johns starred as Clarissa Hailsham-Brown in Godfrey Grayson's mystery film The Spider's Web, a screen adaptation of the eponymous 1954 play by Agatha Christie, and for which American author Matthew Bunson wrote, "Despite its very modest budget, The Spider's Web was able to attract the considerable talents of Glynis Johns." Johns had a supporting role in The Sundowners (1960), for which Variety wrote that "Glynis Johns is a vivacious delight", with The New York Times' Bosley Crowther adding that her role as the Australian landlady Mrs. Firth (which earned her an Oscar nomination for Best Supporting Actress) was "played richly" and with effervescence. In 1962, Johns starred as a nun on Dr. Kildare, helping a sick roommate decide on surgery while having medical issues herself. Johns starred in the remake of The Cabinet of Caligari (1962) as the easily offended and oft-frightened Jane Lindstrom, and she was one of four stars in the 1962 Technicolor drama film The Chapman Report. While filming her first scene in the Chapman Report with director George Cukor, he kicked her in the shin. Though a "subtle kick", it was described as an "unprovoked attack" and by Johns as "so unexpected that I did a terrible sort of double take." On the set, tensions were high, though Cukor and she later laughed about it, and he noted she was "wonderful in the picture." The following year, Johns supported Jackie Gleason in George Marshall's adaptation of the eponymous Corinne Griffith memoir Papa's Delicate Condition, a role described by Jeffrey Kauffman as "neatly understated".

Mary Poppins (1964) is considered Walt Disney's crowning live-action achievement, and is the only one of his films to earn a Best Picture nomination during his lifetime. In the film, Johns plays Winifred Banks, the wife of George Banks, mother of Jane and Michael, and member of the "Votes for Women" suffrage movement, to which she is completely dedicated. When first approached by Walt Disney, Johns thought it was to play the title role of Mary Poppins (played by Julie Andrews), not Mrs. Banks. To ensure she accepted, he explained the mishap over lunch and arranged for the Sherman Brothers to write her a musical number - the song "Sister Suffragette", a prosuffrage protest song pastiche, was written in 1964 with her in mind. "Johns is endearing as the mother," wrote The Hollywood Reporter's James Powers in 1964, "happy as a lark at getting chained to a lamp post for the cause ... she comes in strongly as a singing actor." The role earned her the Laurel Award for Best Female Supporting Performance.

The following year, Johns was cast in Henry Koster's DeLuxe Color family comedy Dear Brigitte as the aesthete Vina, wife of James Stewart, with whom she had first acted 14 years earlier in No Highway in the Sky. She appeared in various character roles in the 1968 American comedy film Don't Just Stand There!, written by Charles Williams, and the 1969 British comedy film Lock Up Your Daughters, directed by Peter Coe.

Johns was cast in 1961 in the ABC/Warner Bros. crime drama The Roaring 20s. She portrayed Kitty O'Moyne, an Irish immigrant who falls overboard into the harbour as she arrives in the United States. Johns guest-starred in the CBS anthology series The Lloyd Bridges Show in the episode "A Game for Alternate Mondays" of the 1962–63 television season, playing widow Leah Marquand, with Leslye Hunter as her daughter Isabella. On 5 August 1963, Vacation Playhouse premiered the episode "Hide and Seek" as the pilot of her eponymous CBS television series Glynis. The original working title for the series was The Glynis Johns Show; in it, Johns played the neophyte mystery writer and amateur sleuth Glynis Granville. In the autumn of that year, Glynis officially premiered, starring Johns and Keith Andes as her husband, Keith Granville, a criminal defence attorney. Due to pressure from NBC's The Virginian and Bill Cullen's The Price Is Right game show on ABC, the programme was cancelled after 13 episodes. In 1965, CBS reran the series as a summer replacement for The Lucy Show, and Glynis ranked number six in the Nielsen ratings. Johns remained busy on screen, appearing as Steffi Bernard in the episode "Who Killed Marty Kelso?" of ABC's detective series Burke's Law opposite Gene Barry. In 1967, she appeared in four episodes of the Batman television series as villainess Lady Penelope Peasoup, one-half of the evil duo with Rudy Vallée as her brother Lord Marmaduke Ffogg.

On stage, Johns played an invalid gentlewoman in Broadway's Too True to Be Good in 1963. She returned to London's West End in 1966 to star alongside Keith Michell in The King's Mare at the Garrick Theatre, in which she played Anne of Cleves and Michell King Henry VIII. Commenting on the production, S. Stanley Gordon wrote, "The heavens must have blessed us, for we received the wonderful news that... London theatre's favourite daughter, Glynis Johns, had agreed to come to London to star in our play." The play was written by screenwriter novelists Jean Canolle and Anita Loos. From 1969 and into the 1970s, Johns turned increasingly to stage work, appearing first in A Talent to Amuse (1969).

=== 1970–1979: A Little Night Music and acclaim ===
In the 1970s, Johns' career focus was on the stage. Following her appearance in earlier Cowardian productions, Johns starred in two more Coward plays in the early 1970s; from 27 January 1970 to September 1970, she was in Come As You Are at London's New Theatre and Strand Theatre, and from 6 March 1972 to 12 March 1972, she was in Marquise at the Bristol Hippodrome in England.

In 1972 and 1973, Johns narrated several fairy tales and other children's classics for Caedmon Records, the record label imprints of HarperCollins Publishers. These included Peter Pan and Snow White. Some were released years later.

In 1973, Johns was in the original cast of A Little Night Music, written by Stephen Sondheim, which premiered on 25 February at the Shubert Theatre in New York City. The song "Send In the Clowns" was written with her in mind. Commenting on director Harold Prince in a 1973 interview, she says he "has eyes in the back of his head and a real driving force, a life force. And with it goes a great deal of loge. He calls us 'crew' and himself 'captain', and he's heartbroken when opening night is over, simply because he doesn't want to be away from us. I think he falls in love with his company." For her role as Desiree Armfeldt, she won a Tony Award for Best Actress in a Musical and Drama Desk Award for Outstanding Actress in a Musical. Sondheim referred to her vocal qualities as a "rumpled bed"; as Anthony Tommasini put it in The New York Times: "Stephen Sondheim composed his most famous song, 'Send In the Clowns,' for an actress with virtually no voice, Glynis Johns, and few genuine singers have performed it as effectively."

Following this, Johns starred in Joseph Hardy's production of Ring Round the Moon at the Center Theatre Group, Los Angeles, from 1 April 1975 to 10 May 1975, with Michael York. From 17 March 1976, she starred in Peter Dews' production of 13 Rue de l'Amour at the Phoenix Theatre in London with film and stage actor Louis Jourdan. This production was held at the Theatre Royal in Norwich; it closed on 8 May 1976. From 1977 to March 1978, Johns starred as Alma Rattenbury in Cause Célèbre, touring Her Majesty's Theatre in London and Leicester Haymarket Theatre among other locations. She was nominated for a Laurence Olivier Award for Actress of the Year in a New Play and won a Variety Club Award for Best Actress in recognition; it was described as a "riveting play", due in part to its cast: "Glynis Johns was superb as Alma Rattenbury, and Lee Montague and Bernard Archard were fantastic as the opposing barristers."

Johns' film roles of the 1970s included playing Myfanwy Price in Andrew Sinclair's 1971 drama film Under Milk Wood opposite Richard Burton and Elizabeth Taylor, Eleanor Critchit in Roy Ward Baker's 1973 horror anthology film The Vault of Horror (in the segment "The Neat Job", a tale of marital discord), Swallow in the 1974 short-film adaptation of Oscar Wilde's The Happy Prince, and Mrs. Amworth in the 1977 British-Canadian horror anthology film Three Dangerous Ladies, a reprisal of the role. Of her original performance as Mrs. Amworth in the eponymous 1975 short film, Ian Holloway on Wyrd Britain wrote, "the titular lady" is "played with flamboyant aplomb by the fabulous Glynis Johns."

=== 1980–1999: Final roles ===
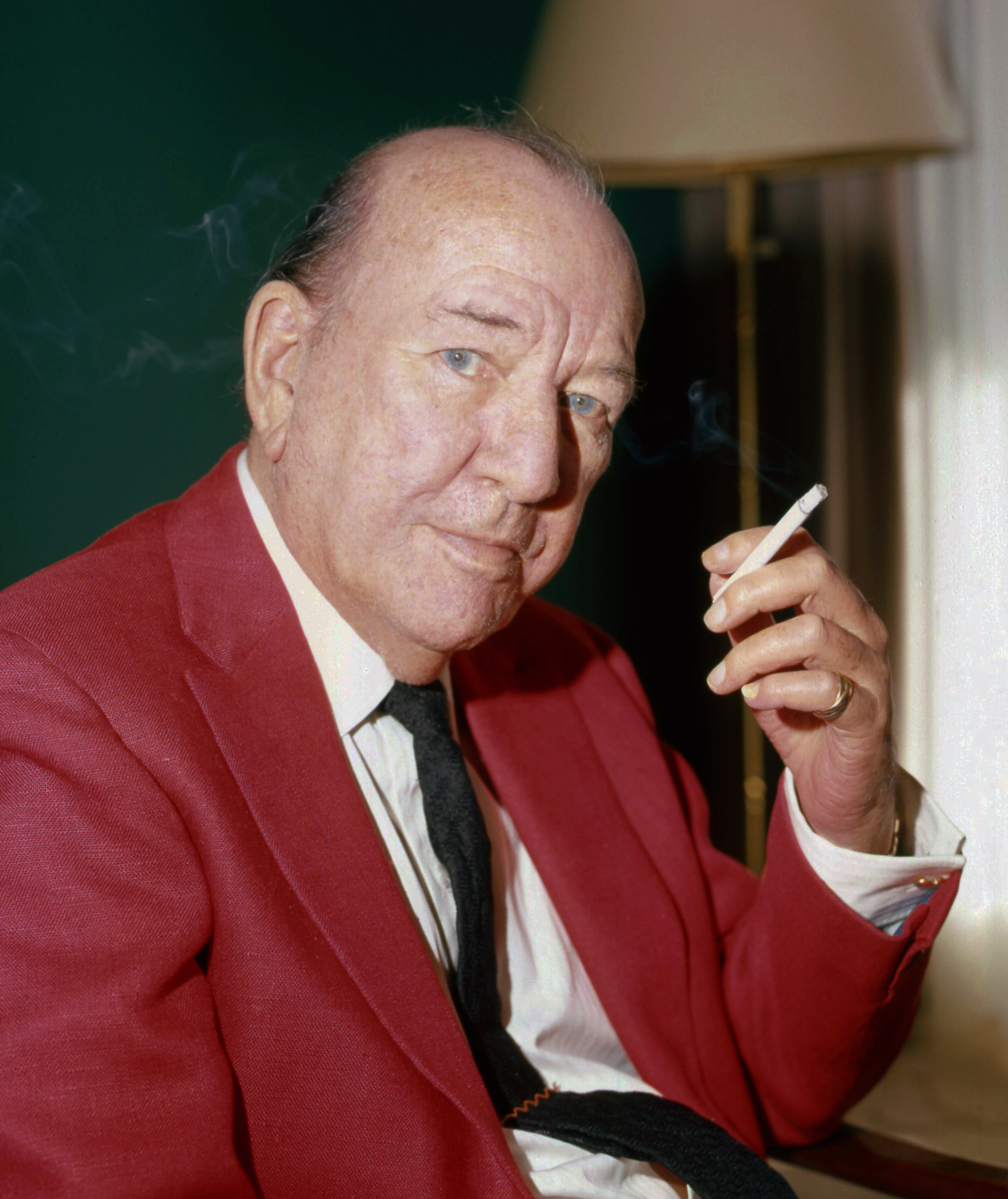
Playwright Noël Coward, in whose plays Johns frequently starred

In classical theatre in Europe, everybody plays all kinds of parts. Juliets go on to play the Nurses; they don't want to play Juliet again. I think we've got to remember to grab onto our perks, whatever is the good thing about each age. Each stage of life should be a progression.

— Glynis Johns
Los Angeles Times, 17 April 1991

Johns appeared in Noël Coward's comic play Hay Fever as Judith Bliss from 4 August 1981 to 10 October 1981 at the Yvonne Arnaud Theatre in Guildford and the Theatre Royal in Nottingham. This was her fourth role in a Noël Coward production. From 20 November 1989 to 20 May 1990, she starred as Lady Catherine Champion-Cheney in W Somerset Maugham's Broadway romance The Circle at the Ambassador Theatre in New York City.

Johns' screen work of the 1980s took second place to her work on stage. In 1982, she was cast as Laura Fitzpatrick Morgan in the American-British biographical television film Little Gloria... Happy at Last with Lucy Gutteridge in the leading role of Gloria Morgan Vanderbilt. Johns had a starring role in Nukie (1987), a South African science-fiction film in which she played the decisive Sister Anne alongside actors Anthony Morrison, Steve Railsback, and Ronald France. In 1988, Johns provided the voice for Miss Grimwood, proprietor of Miss Grimwood's Finishing School for Girls, in Scooby-Doo and the Ghoul School. The plot follows the characters as Miss Grimwood hires them as her gym teachers; once there, however, they find it is actually a school for the daughters of paranormal beings. The same year, Johns starred in Zelly and Me, an American drama film written, directed and produced by Tina Rathborne. In it, Johns plays Co-Co, the wealthy grandmother of protagonist Phoebe (played by Alexandra Johnes) and an egoist with a deeply competitive streak.

During the first season of NBC's hit sitcom Cheers, Johns guest-starred as Diane Chambers' mother, Helen Chambers, an eccentric dowager, who due to a stipulation in Diane's late father's will, will lose all her money unless Diane is married by the next day. In 1985, Johns played Bridget O'Hara in the episode "Sing a Song of Murder" of CBS's crime drama television series Murder, She Wrote, working again with Angela Lansbury. From 1988 to 1989, she played Trudie Pepper, a senior citizen living in an Arizona retirement community, in the television sitcom Coming of Age, also on CBS.

Following earlier work in the 1970s, Johns narrated two more albums for Caedmon Records: The Light Princess in 1981 and Bargain for Frances and Other Frances Stories in 1984.

In 1991, Johns returned to A Little Night Music aged 68, this time playing Madame Armfeldt, the mother of her original character Desiree, with Gordon Davidson directing at the Ricardo Montalbán Theatre in Los Angeles. Following this, she starred as Myrtle Bledsoe in the premiere of Horton Foote's A Coffin in Egypt from June to July 1998 at the Bay Street Theatre in New York City.

On screen, Johns had the main part of Darjeeling alongside Honor Blackman and Derek Jacobi on the American children's television anthology series ABC Weekend Specials (in the short "The Secret Garden", which aired on 5 November 1994).

Johns appeared in just three films in the 1990s, as the grandmother in each. She played the camera-toting grandmother in the 1995 Sandra Bullock hit While You Were Sleeping and the waspish Grandma Rose in Ted Demme's 1994 black comedy film The Ref. Of this role, Caution Spoilers' Sarah noted, "Glynis Johns as the awful Rose is terrific"; her character was often at odds with her son Lloyd Chasseur, played by Kevin Spacey. In 1998, Johns was named a Disney legend in the film category. Her last film appearance was as the grandmother of Molly Shannon's Mary Gallagher in the 1999 film Superstar.

== Public image ==
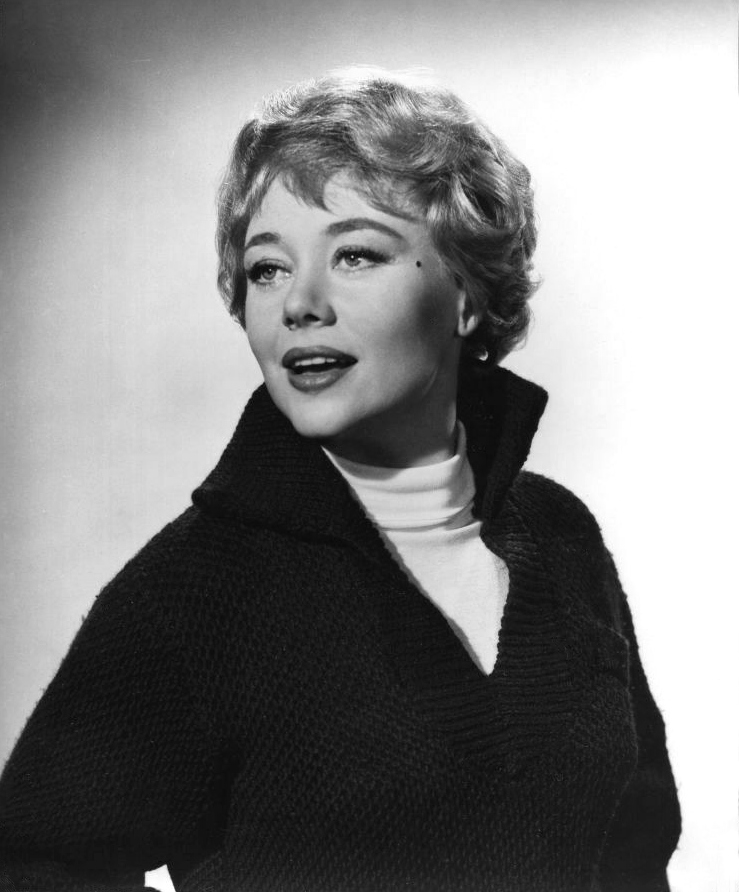
Studio publicity photo of Johns in 1959

In September 1946, when she was still fairly new to the profession, Powell and Pressburger hailed Johns as "one of the most sought-after of all young British stars". She was voted by British exhibitors as the 10th-most popular box-office star in 1951 and 1952. By the time of Loser Takes All (1956), Johns was a top box-office draw.

A devotee of British cinema, Johns said in 1946, "I would sooner play in a good British picture than in the majority of American pictures I have seen," She found her stardom in 1940s Britain (wherein her "glistening blue eyes and perfect comic timing made her British cinema's most sought-after female lead") and was already a star by the time she was in No Highway in the Sky, a joint British and American production produced in 1951, and her first role in American cinema. Johns became an indelible part of the cinema histories of both Britain and America, maintaining her British and American careers simultaneously. Following No Highway in the Sky, she took on increasingly more roles in America and elsewhere; most of her television credits were American, including her eponymous 1963 sitcom Glynis, though her film and theatre credits (with several notable exceptions) were British.

In Finishing the Hat (2010), Stephen Sondheim wrote, "[Johns was] perhaps the only major British stage actress not associated with Shakespeare".

== Personal life ==
Glynis has light brown hair, blue eyes, and is five feet four inches [163 cm] in height. Dancing is still of great interest to her and is her favourite recreation, coupled with the collecting of good syncopated numbers: Glenn Miller's In the Mood is her favourite. Her favourite classical composers are Grieg, Mozart and Debussy. Riding, tennis and ice skating are her sports, and her ideal holiday is one spent in a mountain resort where there is plenty of night-life. Her favourite reading is autobiographies, preferably those of celebrities she knows personally.

— The Voice
Saturday, 20 September 1952

=== Relationships ===
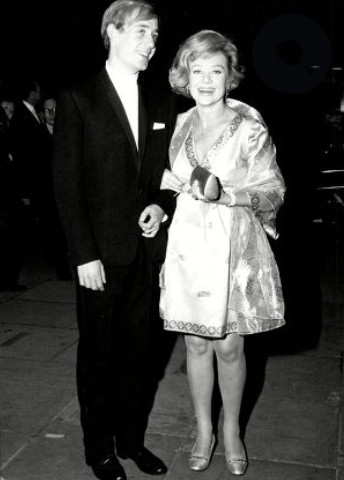
Johns with her son Gareth Forwood

Johns was married four times. She met her first husband, Anthony Forwood, while rehearsing for Quiet Wedding (1941). A year after they met, Forwood asked her on a date and they were married within a month on 29 August 1942 in Westminster, London. The couple's only child, actor Gareth Forwood, was born on 14 October 1945. Following a lengthy court proceeding, she was granted a divorce on 25 June 1948 on the ground of adultery by her husband.

Johns began dating producer Antony Darnborough after working together on Encore (1951). He proposed to her at Windsor's Sunningdale Golf Club in June 1951. The Daily Telegraph later said that "theirs was to have been one of the most glittering show-business weddings," but it never took place. Gertie (1951) took her to Broadway and their wedding was postponed; in December 1951, it was called off. The former couple remained "good friends" and she appeared in his 1953 television drama Personal Affair.

On 1 February 1952 in Manhattan, Johns married David Foster, a Royal Navy officer and later president of Colgate-Palmolive. They divorced on 17 May 1956 on the ground of his adultery with an unnamed woman. He did not contest the charge.

Johns married Cecil Henderson, a businessman, on 10 October 1960 in Westminster, London. They divorced on 21 June 1962. He cited adultery and she did not contest the charge.

Johns' fourth and last husband was the writer and United States Air Force Captain Elliott Arnold. They announced their engagement on 25 June 1964 and were married on 1 October in Los Angeles, California. They divorced on 4 January 1973.

In a 1973 interview with Robert Berkvist on the topic of marriage, Johns stated "Acting is my highest form of intelligence, the time when I use the best part of my brain. I was always told, by my married friends, for example, that I could apply that intelligence to something else, some other aspect of living, but I can't. I don't have the same flair in other things." On the subject of a fifth marriage, she reflected, "I'd tread very softly in that area. Very softly. I certainly wouldn't rush into anything again, and I'd have to have an awful lot in common with anyone I'd consider marrying next time. Why so many marriages? It was absolute conservatism on my part. I was brought up to feel that if you wanted to have an affair with a man, well, you married him. I have friends who, if they'd followed that rule, would have collected an awful lot of pieces of paper by now."

Following the death of her mother, Alyce Steele-Wareham, on 1 September 1971 in Westminster, Johns' father Mervyn Johns married actress Diana Churchill on 4 December 1976 in Hillingdon, London.

Johns has one grandson, Thomas Forwood, a French writer and film director, and three great-grandchildren.

=== Health and voice ===
Early in her career, Johns suffered from severe migraines. In a 1955 interview with Lydia Lane, she admitted, "Only recently have I learned how to relax. And since I have, the migraine headaches, which have plagued me for years, have disappeared. I've finally learned to be still inside. Someone told me once, 'When you let God in on your problems, you can let go and relax,' and I've found that it works."

Following her marriage to David Foster in 1952, Johns became fourteen pounds (6.5 kg) overweight. Talking with Lydia Lane in 1955, she stated "I was relaxed, happy, with little to do and I suppose I simply didn't burn up as much energy as usual. My appetite stayed the same and I gained a few pounds at a time until one day I discovered I was 14 pounds overweight." Further to the point, she said "I'm convinced that weight is a mental problem". "I counted calories for a while, but nothing happened until I became really disturbed about it. From that moment on, I began to lose weight and in three weeks, I was back to normal. The point I am trying to make is that dieting alone is not enough. It must be accompanied by a strong will and determination to lose [weight]."

A few days before Johns was due to play Desiree Armfeldt at the opening night of A Little Night Music in 1973, she was rushed to hospital for emergency treatment of an intestinal infection. The debut was postponed by a week and Tammy Grimes was thought to be a likely successor. However, to the great surprise of her doctor, Johns rejoined the show after just two days: "I was not going to have anybody else sing my songs," she said.

Johns suffered from stage fright throughout most of her career. In a 2023 interview, her grandson Thomas said, "Of course, she came across as supremely confident, but in private, she suffered quite crippling stage fright that she never really got over – only managed – so that makes her career even more remarkable."

Johns' voice has been described by a press agent as "like the sound of a brook burbling over a pebbled bed." In Finishing the Hat (2010), Stephen Sondheim wrote that she had a "small but silvery voice that was musical and smokily pure".

=== Later years and death ===
Johns was predeceased by all four of her husbands. The first to die was her third husband, Cecil Henderson, in 1978, followed by her fourth husband, Elliott Arnold, in 1980, her first husband, Anthony Forwood, in 1988, and her second husband, David Foster, in 2010. Her then 62-year-old son, Gareth Forwood, died in 2007 from a heart attack during cancer treatment.

With the death of Olivia de Havilland in 2020, Johns became the oldest living Academy Award nominee in any acting category. In 2021, with the death of Betty White, she became the oldest living Disney Legend.

Johns retired to the U.S., where she later resided at the Belmont Village Hollywood Heights, a senior-living community located near the Hollywood Bowl in Los Angeles.

Johns died in Los Angeles on 4 January 2024, at age 100. In April, her ashes were transported to Wales to be buried at Jerusalem Independent Chapel in Burry Port, alongside the remains of her father. The song "Send In the Clowns" was played at the service.

== Advocacy ==
Chris Bryant, Labour MP for Rhondda, described Johns as "a lifetime ambassador for the creative arts in the U.K. and particularly Wales." In 1971, Johns told BBC Cymru Wales that a national theatre in Wales would be a positive addition to the country, because "Welsh people ... have a love for their art and are not mercenary about it."

== Filmography and discography ==
- South Riding (1938)
- Murder in the Family (1938)
- Prison Without Bars (1938)
- On the Night of the Fire (1939)
- Under Your Hat (1940)
- The Briggs Family (1940)
- The Thief of Bagdad (1940)
- The Prime Minister (1940)
- 49th Parallel (1941)
- The Adventures of Tartu (1943)
- The Halfway House (1944)
- Perfect Strangers (1945)
- This Man Is Mine (1946)
- Frieda (1947)
- An Ideal Husband (1947)
- Miranda (1948)
- Third Time Lucky (1949)
- Helter Skelter (1949)
- Dear Mr. Prohack (1949)
- State Secret (1950)
- Flesh and Blood (1951)
- No Highway in the Sky (1951)
- Appointment with Venus (1951)
- Encore (1951)
- The Magic Box (1951)
- The Card (1952)
- The Sword and the Rose (1953)
- Personal Affair (1953)
- Rob Roy, the Highland Rogue (1953)
- The Weak and the Wicked (1954)
- The Seekers (1954)
- The Beachcomber (1954)
- Mad About Men (1954)
- Josephine and Men (1955)
- The Court Jester (1955)
- Loser Takes All (1956)
- Around the World in 80 Days (1956)
- All Mine to Give (1957)
- Another Time, Another Place (1958)
- Shake Hands with the Devil (1959)
- Last of the Few (1960)
- The Spider's Web (1960)
- The Sundowners (1960)
- The Cabinet of Caligari (1962)
- The Chapman Report (1962)
- Papa's Delicate Condition (1963)
- Mary Poppins (1964)
- Dear Brigitte (1965)
- Don't Just Stand There! (1968)
- Lock Up Your Daughters! (1969)
- Under Milk Wood (1971)
- The Vault of Horror (1973)
- Nukie (1987)
- Zelly and Me (1988)
- The Ref (1994)
- While You Were Sleeping (1995)
- Superstar (1999)

== Honours and awards ==
Award	Year	Category	Title of work	Result	Ref(s)
National Board of Review	1942	Best Acting	49th Parallel	Won	
Academy Award	1961	Best Supporting Actress	The Sundowners	Nominated	
Golden Globe Awards	1963	Best Actress in a Motion Picture – Drama	The Chapman Report	Nominated	
Laurel Awards	1965	Female Supporting Performance	Mary Poppins	Won	
Tony Award	1973	Best Actress in a Musical	A Little Night Music	Won	
Drama Desk Award	1973	Outstanding Actress in a Musical	A Little Night Music	Won	
Laurence Olivier Awards	1977	Actress of the Year in a New Play	Cause célèbre	Nominated	
Variety Club	1978	Best Actress	Cause célèbre	Won	
Disney Legends	1998			Honoured	

== See also ==
- List of British actors
- List of South African actors
- List of Welsh women
- List of Batman television series cast members
- List of Academy Award winners and nominees from Great Britain
- List of actors with Academy Award nominations
- List of Broadway musicals stars
- List of Disney Legends
- List of centenarians (actors, filmmakers and entertainers)
- Cinema of the United Kingdom
- Theatre of the United Kingdom
