= State Secret (1950 film) =

- Lobby card
- Directed by: Sidney Gilliat
- Written by: Sidney Gilliat
- Based on: novel by Roy Huggins
- Produced by: Sidney Gilliat; Frank Launder
- Starring: Douglas Fairbanks Jr.; Glynis Johns; Jack Hawkins
- Cinematography: Robert Krasker
- Music by: William Alwyn
- Production company: London Films
- Distributed by: British Lion Films
- Release date: 11 September 1950 (UK)
- Running time: 105 minutes
- Country: United Kingdom
- Language: English
- Box office: £187,022 (UK)

State Secret is a 1950 British drama thriller film directed by Sidney Gilliat and starring Douglas Fairbanks Jr., Jack Hawkins, Glynis Johns, Olga Lowe and Herbert Lom. It was made at Isleworth Studios with Italian location shooting in Trento and the Dolomites. It was released in the United States under the title The Great Manhunt.

== Plot ==
John Marlowe is an American surgeon visiting England when he is invited to Vosnia (a fictitious East-European country) to receive the "Kepler Gold Medal" for his contributions to medical science, and, coincidentally, to demonstrate his new techniques on a patient. Midway through the operation, he discovers that he is operating on the Vosnian dictator, General Niva. Niva dies during the recovery period. From talking beforehand with Colonel Galcon, the Minister of Health, Minister of Public Services and Minister for State Security, Marlowe is certain he is doomed—he knows too much—so he makes his escape while Galcon is distracted by Niva's death. With elections coming soon, the general is replaced by a double, and Marlowe is hunted by the state police.

Marlowe's attempts to telephone and reach the American embassy nearly get him captured. While hiding in a theater during a show, he notices a woman singing in English. He goes backstage and enlists the help of the reluctant, half-English Lisa. Marlowe has an idea: inside the coat he was accidentally given in a barber shop, by the barber, they find a wallet containing the ID of a Karl Theodor, and foreign currency, the possession of which is a capital offense in Vosnia. They blackmail the smuggler Theodor into helping them. They are pursued across the country and are on the point of escaping across the border when one of Karl's men, who is leading them across the mountains, is shot by a border guard and killed, and Lisa is wounded. Marlowe refuses to abandon her, and is captured by Galcon's men.

Galcon arranges a "shooting accident" for Marlowe, but as he is about to walk outside to his fate, the substitute for dictator Niva makes a live speech on the radio, and shots are heard. Galcon confirms by telephone that the stand-in has been assassinated. As the people have witnessed the death of Niva, albeit the fake Niva, it is no longer necessary to maintain the cover-up, nor to eliminate Marlowe and Robinson, who are subsequently released and fly to freedom in the West, and ultimately to their new life together in America.

== Cast ==
- Douglas Fairbanks Jr. as Dr John Marlowe
- Glynis Johns as Lisa Robinson
- Olga Lowe as Baba (the taller "Sister Robinson")
- Therese van Kye as Teresa (the shorter "Sister Robinson")
- Jack Hawkins as Colonel Galcon
- Walter Rilla as General Niva
- Karel Stepanek as Dr Revo
- Leonard Sachs as Dr Poldoi
- Herbert Lom as Theodor
- Robert Ayres as Buckman
- Howard Douglas as Clubman
- Martin Boddey as Clubman
- Russell Waters as Clubman
- Arthur Howard as Clubman
- Carl Jaffé as Prada
- Gerard Heinz as Bendel
- Leo Bieber as Man at Telephone Box
- Nelly Arno as Shop Woman
- Paul Demel as Barber
- Danny Green as Taxi Driver
- Anton Diffring as State Policeman
- Peter Illing as Macco
- Arthur Reynolds as Compere
- Richard Molinas as Red Nose
- Eric Pohlmann as Cable Car Conductor
- Hans Moser as Sigrist
- Louis Wiechert as Christian
- Gerik Schjelderup as Bartorek
- Henrik Jacobsen as Mountain Soldier
- Guido Lorraine as Lieutenant Prachi

== Production ==
=== Development ===
Gilliat got the idea for making the film from a newspaper article he read shortly before the Second World War. He decided that it would make a "chase thriller" in the style of films he had written for Alfred Hitchcock and Carol Reed, notably The Lady Vanishes and Night Train to Munich. He found it difficult to do during the war years but reactivated it after the war.

The fictitious "Vosnian" language was constructed for the film by a linguistics expert, combining Latin and Slavic elements.

The star role went to Douglas Fairbanks Jr., who had made a number of British films in the 1930s and was keen to work in the country again. His casting was announced in May 1949.

Fairbanks later said: "We have definitely reached a One World status in pictures. British comedy and character acting do not seem remote to us any more."

In July it was announced that another Hollywood star would play the female lead but by August Glynis Johns had got the role.

=== Filming ===
Filming began in August 1949. Although there was some filming done at Isleworth Studios in London, Gilliat wanted to make as much of the film as possible on location. There were eight weeks of location filming, in Trento and the Dolomites. Trento stood in for the fictitious capital. Filming finished by November 1949.

Fairbanks later said that filming was difficult as some in Italy thought the film was anti-Communist while others said it was pro-Communist, and the film unit had to avoid riots. Gilliat said that the film workers' unions were particularly difficult during the making of this film.

== Reception ==
=== Critical reception ===
In The New York Times, Bosley Crowther wrote, "... this picture is just about as lively as they come, and under Mr. Gilliat's direction, it moves like an auto gaining speed ... Beautifully photographed in Italian cities and in the Italian Dolomites, the whole adventure has the eminent advantage of a sparkling Continental atmosphere. And it also has the advantage of good performance by all concerned—by Mr. Fairbanks as the kidnapped surgeon, looking a little like Eugene O'Neill; by Miss Johns, very saucy and explosive, as the music-hall girl; by Jack Hawkins as the Vosnian premier [sic], with an Oxford accent and a Nazi attitude; by Herbert Lom as the Balkan shyster and any number of others in small roles."

=== Box office ===
Trade papers called the film a "notable box office attraction" in British cinemas in 1950. It was one of five successful productions by London Films that year, the others being The Wooden Horse, The Happiest Days of Your Life, Odette and Seven Days to Noon.

State Secret was less popular in the United States. Fairbanks said "I thought I did my best work ever; Sidney really kept the pot boiling."

Gilliat thought that the film was "underrated" and suffered from being released soon after The Third Man. He also felt that the film "suffered from Douglas Fairbanks Jnr, you needed a very warm personality and we got rather a cold one. But the picture otherwise came off, the thing was highly profitable, got good notices."
