= Josephine and Men =

1955 British film by Roy Boulting

- British 1-sheet poster
- Directed by: Roy Boulting
- Written by: Nigel Balchin additional scenes Frank Harvey
- Based on: original story "Among Friends" by Nigel Balchin
- Produced by: John Boulting
- Starring: Glynis Johns; Jack Buchanan; Donald Sinden; Peter Finch
- Cinematography: Gilbert Taylor
- Edited by: Max Benedict
- Music by: John Addison
- Production company: Charter Film Productions
- Distributed by: British Lion Films
- Release date: 9 November 1955
- Running time: 98 minutes
- Country: United Kingdom
- Language: English
- Budget: £123,345

Josephine and Men is a 1955 British comedy film directed by Roy Boulting and starring Glynis Johns, Jack Buchanan, Donald Sinden and Peter Finch. It was written by Nigel Balchin, Frank Harvey and Boulting. Produced by the Boulting Brothers it was shot at Shepperton Studios and distributed by British Lion Films.

It was the last English-language film for Jack Buchanan.

== Plot ==
At the Parasites Club, the porter reminds resident Charles Luton that his subscription is overdue. Charles dismisses the reminder, asking to be notified later. At the bar, he laments to the barman about feeling overwhelmed by his numerous lady friends. When the barman suggests marriage, Charles scoffs, saying women are difficult to understand. He points to his niece Josephine as an example, describing her as overly soft-hearted and always trying to "rescue" helpless men.

Charles is relieved when Josephine becomes engaged to successful businessman Alan Hartley. However, Alan introduces her to his old school friend, David Hewer, an aspiring playwright living in squalor, unable to finish a play. For Josephine, David becomes her new project. Within weeks, she breaks off her engagement to Alan and announces that she will marry David, although David is unaware of this plan. David and Josephine, whom he calls Jo, marry, and with Jo's care, David begins writing successful plays. They live in a remote country cottage, where Charles comes to stay for a few days.

One night, Alan visits them, seeking refuge. He explains that his business partner has committed fraud, and although Alan claims innocence, his signature appears on incriminating documents. With no way to prove his innocence, Alan plans to flee abroad and asks to stay until his contact calls with arrangements. Jo, now eager to "save" Alan, tends to him, giving him David's clothes and shaving kit without asking David. She worries about Alan living alone in exile. David, anxious about being implicated and jealous of her revived attention towards Alan, demands that he leave. After a heated argument, David storms off to the pub. Charles follows David.

David rushes home after realising Alan is alone with Jo. Charles follows him back to the cottage. They return to find the house empty. Charles discovers a farewell note from Jo but hides it from David, who assumes she has run off with Alan. Drunk and distraught, David confesses his feelings of being smothered by Jo's care but says he still loves her. Meanwhile, Jo and Alan, escaping in her car, are stopped at a police roadblock. After being taken to the station, they learn that Alan's partner has been found dead, having apparently committed suicide and left a note taking full responsibility for the fraud. Jo realises Alan no longer needs her and decides to return to David. Back at the cottage, Charles encourages Jo to revise her note, saying only that she gave Alan a lift and will return. Jo wakes David, shows him the new note, and they reconcile.

== Cast ==
- Glynis Johns as Josephine ("Jo") Luton
- Jack Buchanan as Uncle Charles Luton
- Donald Sinden as Alan Hartley
- Peter Finch as David Hewer
- Heather Thatcher as Aunt May Luton
- Ronald Squire as Frederick Luton, Josephine's father
- William Hartnell as Inspector Parsons
- Victor Maddern as Henry
- Gerald Sim as Detective Sergeant Allen
- Hugh Moxey as Police Inspector
- Sam Kydd as Police Sergeant
- Tonie MacMillan as Mrs. McFee
- Wally Patch as pub landlord
- Peggy Ann Clifford as barmaid
- Thorley Walters as vacuum cleaner salesman
- Laurence Naismith as porter
- John Le Mesurier as registrar
- Lisa Gastoni as Italian girl
- Michael Ward as bohemian, living in Hewer's tenement
- Edward Cast as motorcycle policeman
- Jacques Cey as André
- Harold Goodwin as garage mechanic

== Production ==
The film was based on a story by Nigel Balchin, 'Among Friends', which appeared in the 1954 collection Last Recollections of My Uncle Charles. Balchin had previously used the basic plot of this story - a married couple who provide a safe haven for a man on the run, who is an old flame of the wife - in a stage play, Carted Stag.

Balchin's biographer called the resulting script "an uneasy blend of farce and psychological case study."

Finch's casting was announced in December 1954. Filming took place in early 1955. Finch turned up to filming while drunk one day, causing his scenes to be rescheduled; Roy Boulting fined him £500 and Finch accepted this without complaint.

The movie was a key early appearance by John Le Mesurier who was subsequently put under contract by the Boulting Brothers.

== Critical reception ==
The Boultings admitted the film was "a little bit too sophisticated, a little bit too remote from the understanding of a mass cinema audience."

The Monthly Film Bulletin wrote: "Nigel Balchin's script is decidedly limp, and Josephine and Men contains most of the traditional jokes of British screen comedy. Bohemians, foreigners and elderly housekeepers are among the targets. Roy Boulting's direction has little sparkle, and performances are dogged."

Variety wrote: "There's not a great deal of substance in this British comedy made by the Boulting Bros, but a topweight local cast gives it considerable marquee strength here ... The story is related in a series of continuous flashbacks by Jack Buchanan, the girl's bachelor uncle who is forever on the run from amorous ladies. He puts a lot of charm in the character, as do the other three principal characters. ... But there are too many irrelevancies to the story. Roy Boulting's direction ... is on the leisurely side. Supporting roles are neatly played."

Sight and Sound called it a "comedy about a girl with a thing about helpless men, with a script that has a thing about helpless jokes."

Balchin's biographer wrote, "Padded out to way beyond its natural length, and conceived more as a comedy than the taut psychological drama it could and should have been, Josephine and Men travestied Balchin’s original story. However the biographer did saif if the film "served no other purpose, it did establish that Buchanan, with his immaculately groomed appearance, mellifluous voice, urbanity and gently cajoling manner, was the living embodiment of Uncle Charles."

Britmovie wrote, "the lightweight and stagey story is framed in flashback by the debonair Jack Buchanan’s narration but fails to exude any humour or convincing romance."

The Radio Times said: "not as funny as it could have been, but the cast is likeable."

== Notes ==
- Collett, Derek (2015). His own executioner : the life of Nigel Balchin. SilverWood.
