= Papa's Delicate Condition =

1963 film by George Marshall

- Film poster by Jack Rickard
- Directed by: George Marshall
- Written by: Jack Rose
- Based on: Papa's Delicate Condition; 1952 book by Corinne Griffith
- Produced by: Jack Rose
- Starring: Jackie Gleason; Glynis Johns; Charlie Ruggles; Laurel Goodwin; Linda Bruhl
- Cinematography: Loyal Griggs
- Edited by: Frank P. Keller
- Music by: Joseph J. Lilley
- Production company: Amro Productions
- Distributed by: Paramount Pictures
- Release date: March 6, 1963
- Running time: 98 minutes
- Country: United States
- Language: English

Papa's Delicate Condition is a 1963 American comedy film starring Jackie Gleason and Glynis Johns. It was an adaptation of the Corinne Griffith memoir of the same name, about her father and growing up in Texarkana, Texas. Jimmy Van Heusen (music) and Sammy Cahn (lyrics) won an Academy Award for Best Original Song for "Call Me Irresponsible".

Another Cahn/Van Heusen song, "Walking Happy", was used in a scene with Gleason and his on-screen daughter, Linda Bruhl, walking down a street while he sings about the people that they meet along the way. However, the scene was cut before the film's release. The song was later used in a Broadway musical of the same name.

== Plot ==
Jack Griffith, known as "Papa" to all, is a family man in a Texas town, but an irresponsibly eccentric one especially when he has had one too many drinks. To impress his six-year-old daughter, Corinne, he spends the family's savings to buy his own circus, simply so the little girl can have her own pony.

His elder daughter, Augusta, becomes distraught as her father makes some questionable business deals under the influence of alcohol. This causes strife within the Griffith household and makes her beau's father (the local bank president) forbid his son to associate with the Griffith family.

After his squandering leaves the Griffiths in debt, wife Ambolyn packs up Augusta and Corinne and moves to Texarkana, Texas, where her father, Anthony Ghio, is the mayor. Griffith attempts to use his circus to help Ghio's bid for reelection, but accidentally causes Ambolyn to end up with a broken hand.

Despondent, he leaves for Louisiana and is little seen or heard from by the family. Talked into an attempt at reconciliation, Papa is reluctant, believing the Griffiths want nothing more to do with him, but he is welcomed back with open arms.

== Cast ==
- Jackie Gleason as Jack Griffith, Corinne's father
- Glynis Johns as Ambolyn Griffith, Corinne's mother
- Linda Bruhl as Corinne Griffith
- Charlie Ruggles as Mayor Ghio, Corinne's grandfather
- Laurel Goodwin as Augusta
- Ned Glass as Mr. Sparrow
- Murray Hamilton as Mr. Harvey
- Elisha Cook, Jr. as Mr. Keith
- Charles Lane as Mr. Cosgrove
- Claude Johnson as Norman
- Don Beddoe as Mayor Ghio's assistant
- Juanita Moore as Ellie
- Trevor Bardette as Stanley Henderson II

== Production ==
The novel was published in 1952. Paramount Pictures bought the film rights and assigned Henry and Phoebe Ephron to adapt it. In 1955, it was announced Fred Astaire would star, and the film would be done as a musical. However, filming was postponed so Astaire could make Silk Stockings.

Filming ended up being delayed until 1962, with Jack Rose now the writer and Jackie Gleason the star. Two songs written for the proposed Astaire film by Sammy Cahn and Jimmy Van Heusen were used, along with a new song, "Bill Bailey."

"This picture is just vanilla", said Gleason, "but I needed something like it after Requiem for a Heavyweight, The Hustler and Gigot."

The part of the young girl was played by Linda Bruhl, whose experience had mostly been in TV commercials.

== See also ==
- List of American films of 1963
