= The Spider's Web (1960 film) =

British mystery by Godfrey Grayson

- British quad poster
- Directed by: Godfrey Grayson
- Written by: Agatha Christie (play); Albert G. Miller; Eldon Howard
- Produced by: Edward J. Danziger; Harry Lee Danziger
- Starring: Glynis Johns; John Justin; Cicely Courtneidge; Jack Hulbert
- Cinematography: James Wilson
- Edited by: Bill Lewthwaite
- Music by: Tony Crombie
- Production company: Danziger Productions
- Distributed by: United Artists
- Release date: November 1960
- Running time: 88 minutes
- Country: United Kingdom
- Language: English

The Spider's Web (also known as The Spider's Web by Agatha Christie) is a 1960 British mystery film directed by Godfrey Grayson and starring Glynis Johns, John Justin, Cicely Courtneidge and Jack Hulbert. It was adapted by Albert G. Miller and Eldon Howard from the 1954 play Spider's Web by Agatha Christie, and was a rare Technicolor 'A' feature from the Danzigers.

It was remade as a television play starring Penelope Keith, broadcast on BBC Two on 26 December 1982.

== Plot ==
An ambassador's wife must hide the corpse of her stepdaughter's unlikeable stepfather from her husband, who is bringing important visitors to their country home.

== Cast ==
- Glynis Johns as Clarissa Hailsham-Brown
- John Justin as Henry Hailsham-Brown
- Jack Hulbert as Sir Rowland Delahaye
- Cicely Courtneidge as Miss Peake
- Ronald Howard as Jeremy
- David Nixon as Elgin
- Wendy Turner as Pippa
- Basil Dignam as Hugo
- Joan Sterndale-Bennett as Mrs Elgin
- Ferdy Mayne as Oliver
- Peter Butterworth as Inspector Lord
- Anton Rodgers as Sergeant Jones
- Robert Raglan as Dr. Berry

== Critical reception ==
The Monthly Film Bulletin wrote: "The attempt at light relief falls flat, while the comically inept police inspector is little short of ludicrous. ...There is the usual surprise denouement, but much is left vague or unclarified."

Leslie Halliwell wrote: "Fairly standard who-done-it played unwisely for comedy."

TV Guide wrote, "an entertaining film version of Agatha Christie's 1954 stage play about a diplomat's wife who hides the corpse of her stepdaughter's father. Though there is no Miss Marple or Hercule Poirot to push this programmer along, it still moves at a lively pace."
