= Glynis (TV series) =

- Genre: Sitcom
- Created by: Jess Oppenheimer
- Written by: Tom Adair; James B. Allardice; Arthur Julian; Jess Oppenheimer
- Directed by: E. W. Swackhamer
- Starring: Glynis Johns; Keith Andes
- Country of origin: United States
- Original language: English
- No. of seasons: 1
- No. of episodes: 13

Production
- Executive producer: Jess Oppenheimer
- Camera setup: Multi-camera
- Running time: 22–24 minutes
- Production company: Desilu Productions

Original release
- Network: CBS
- Release: September 25 – December 18, 1963

Glynis is an American sitcom that aired Wednesdays at 8:30 pm on CBS from September 25 to December 18, 1963.

== Synopsis ==
The series stars Welsh actress Glynis Johns as Glynis Granville, a mystery writer. Keith Andes appeared as Keith Granville, Glynis' husband who works as a successful criminal defense attorney. Together, the couple would attempt to solve various crimes. George Mathews co-stars as Glynis' friend, Chick Rogers, a retired police officer, who offers advice and solace in her writing.

Glynis faced competition from the third segment of the 90-minute western The Virginian on NBC and from Bill Cullen's The Price Is Right prime time game show on ABC. The series was canceled after 13 episodes.

In 1965, when CBS brought the series back in reruns as a summer replacement for The Lucy Show, Glynis ranked #6 in the Nielsen ratings.

== Background ==
On August 5, 1963, CBS' Vacation Playhouse aired an episode titled "Hide and Seek," which was the pilot for Glynis. The series' working title was The Glynis Johns Show, but eventually it was shortened to the star's first name.

== Production notes ==
Glynis was produced by Desilu and created and executive produced by Jess Oppenheimer, who originated I Love Lucy with Lucille Ball and Desi Arnaz.

== Notable guest stars ==
- John Dehner
- Eddie Foy Jr.
- Ned Glass
- Harvey Korman
- Strother Martin

== Episodes ==
Episode #	Episode title	Original airdate
1-1	"Three Men in a Tub"	September 25, 1963
1-2	"Ten Cents a Dance"	October 2, 1963
1-3	"Keep It Cool"	October 9, 1963
1-4	"A Little Knowledge Is Fatal"	October 16, 1963
1-5	"Mr. Butterworth Does It Himself"	October 23, 1963
1-6	"Glynis Goes Wrong"	October 30, 1963
1-7	"The Pros and Cons"	November 6, 1963
1-8	"Agents Are Murder"	November 13, 1963
1-9	"Two Way Stretch"	November 20, 1963
1-10	"The Body Guards"	November 27, 1963
1-11	"Catsa Nostra"	December 4, 1963
1-12	"This One Will Kill You"	December 11, 1963
1-13	"Crime After a Fashion"	December 18, 1963
