= Personal Affair =

1953 film by Anthony Pelissier

- Directed by: Anthony Pelissier (as Anthony Pélissier)
- Written by: Lesley Storm
- Based on: play "The Day's Mischief" by Lesley Storm
- Produced by: Antony Darnborough
- Starring: Gene Tierney; Leo Genn; Glynis Johns
- Cinematography: Reginald H. Wyer
- Edited by: Frederick Wilson
- Music by: William Alwyn
- Production company: Two Cities Films
- Distributed by: United Artists (US)
- Release dates: 20 October 1953 (UK); 15 October 1954 (US)
- Running time: 82 minutes
- Country: United Kingdom
- Language: English

Personal Affair is a 1953 British drama film directed by Anthony Pelissier and starring Gene Tierney, Leo Genn and Glynis Johns. The screenplay by Lesley Storm was based on her 1951 play "The Day's Mischief."

== Plot ==
Teenager Barbara Vining has an unrequited crush on her Latin-language teacher, Stephen Barlow and goes to his house for private tutoring. Barlow's wife Kay notices Barbara's infatuation and cruelly confronts her. Barbara, who is humiliated, runs out of their house. Stephen phones Barbara at her home and asks her to meet him at the village weir, late at night, which she does.

Barbara does not return home to her parents Henry and Vi. By the next day Vi becomes distraught and is heavily sedated, while Henry angrily confronts Stephen. The police are brought in and Stephen lies to them about meeting Barbara at the weir. By the second day, Stephen is accused by the community, without any evidence, of having had an affair with Barbara or even of causing her death by murder or suicide.

Barbara's gossipy spinster Aunt Evelyn, who lives with the family, makes the situation considerably worse with her innuendo, by projecting her own, much earlier unrequited love experience onto her niece. As the police drag the river to find Barbara's body, an irate group of concerned mothers meet with the school's headmaster, causing Stephen to lose his job. He confesses his original lie to Kay, but Aunt Evelyn tells Kay that Stephen was having an affair with Barbara. Kay flees her home, much as she had earlier caused Barbara to do. After three days, Barbara returns, alive, but questions remain.

== Cast ==
- Gene Tierney as Kay Barlow
- Leo Genn as Stephen Barlow
- Glynis Johns as Barbara Vining
- Walter Fitzgerald as Henry Vining
- Pamela Brown as Aunt Evelyn
- Megs Jenkins as Vi Vining
- Michael Hordern as headmaster Griffith
- Thora Hird as Mrs. Usher
- Norah Gorsen as Phoebe
- Nanette Newman as Sally
- Martin Boddey as Police Inspector

== Play ==
Lesley Storm's The Day's Mischief premiered in 1951 starring Muriel Pavlow. The play was performed in the US in 1953.

== Production ==
The play was a flop but Anthony Dartmough thought it would make an ideal film and bought the rights. The film was made at Pinewood Studios by Two Cities Films in March 1953. Gene Tierney and Leo Genn had previously made Plymouth Adventure together.

Tierney made the film in part to spend 18 months out of the US, which would enable her to pay less tax in the US, and assist in her romance with Aly Khan. During the making of the movie she found it difficult to remember her lines for the first time in her career, a result of her increasing mental illness. Tierney said she got through the shoot with the assistance of her maid who would help her learn her lines.

It was a rare female focused film from the Rank Organisation.

== Critical reaction ==
The Monthly Film Bulletin wrote: "The plot of Personal Affair piles up a whole series of misunderstandings, few of them altogether plausible. ... In fact, the characters and their motives belong to the artificial world of woman's magazine fiction. Rather unhappily, neither the scriptwriter nor the director has been prepared to let the film assume this level. ... Glynis Johns, though inevitably not altogether looking the part, contrives to make something of the bewildered schoolgirl. Other players have to convey emotional tension with nothing much to base it on, and for the most part fail."

Variety wrote: "Up to a point, Personal Affair is a taut meller. But once the mystery is resolved, the action drags on to an awkward anti-climax. Despite this, the pic has substantial entertainment merit and sufficient marquee lure to help it towards steady grosses on both sides of the Atlantic."

In The Radio Times Guide to Films Robyn Karney gave the film 3/5 stars, writing: "A somewhat overheated and unconvincing drama, this nevertheless illustrates the ease with which relationships in small communities can become damaged by gossip."

Bosley Crowther wrote in The New York Times: "a decent, eventually tedious film".
