= National Board of Review Awards 1942 =

Awards for motion pictures

14th National Board of Review Awards

December 24, 1942

The 14th National Board of Review Awards were announced on 24 December 1942.

== Best English Language Films ==
1. In Which We Serve
2. One of Our Aircraft Is Missing
3. Mrs. Miniver
4. Journey for Margaret
5. Wake Island
6. The Male Animal
7. The Major and the Minor
8. Sullivan's Travels
9. The Moon and Sixpence
10. The Pied Piper

== Winners ==
- Best English Language Films: In Which We Serve
- Best Documentary: Moscow Strikes Back
- Best Acting:
  - Ernest Anderson - In This Our Life
  - Florence Bates - The Moon and Sixpence
  - James Cagney - Yankee Doodle Dandy
  - Jack Carson - The Male Animal
  - Charles Coburn - In This Our Life, Kings Row and H. M. Pulham, Esq.
  - Greer Garson - Mrs. Miniver and Random Harvest
  - Sydney Greenstreet - Across the Pacific
  - William Holden - The Remarkable Andrew
  - Tim Holt - The Magnificent Ambersons
  - Glynis Johns - The Invaders
  - Gene Kelly - For Me and My Gal
  - Ida Lupino - Moontide
  - Diana Lynn - The Major and the Minor
  - Hattie McDaniel - In This Our Life
  - Bernard Miles - In Which We Serve
  - John Mills - In Which We Serve
  - Thomas Mitchell - Moontide
  - Agnes Moorehead - The Magnificent Ambersons
  - Margaret O'Brien - Journey for Margaret
  - Susan Peters - Random Harvest
  - Edward G. Robinson - Tales of Manhattan
  - Ginger Rogers - Roxie Hart and The Major and the Minor
  - George Sanders - The Moon and Sixpence
  - William Severn - Journey for Margaret
  - Ann Sheridan - Kings Row
  - Rudy Vallée - The Palm Beach Story
  - Anton Walbrook - The Invaders
  - Googie Withers - One of Our Aircraft Is Missing
  - Monty Woolley - The Pied Piper
  - Teresa Wright - Mrs. Miniver
  - Robert Young - H. M. Pulham, Esq., Journey for Margaret and Joe Smith, American
