= Nukie =

- Canadian VHS poster for Nukie
- Directed by: Sias Odendaal; Michael Pakleppa
- Screenplay by: Sias Odendaal; Ben Taylor
- Story by: Sias Odendaal
- Produced by: Gregory Cascante; Joe Dreier; Rolf Frederick; Roy Sargeant; Albie Venter; Ian Walters; Frederik Botha
- Starring: Anthony Morrison; Steve Railsback; Glynis Johns; Ronald France
- Cinematography: Anthony Busbridge; Horst Schier
- Edited by: Avril Beukes; Illo Endrulat; Gaby Grausam; Gisela Haugg; Verena Neumann; Roelf van Jaarsveld; Scott Vickerby
- Music by: Nic Pickard
- Production companies: Lars International Pictures; Overseas Film Communications Limited
- Distributed by: Lars International Pictures
- Release date: 1 July 1987 (South Africa)
- Running time: 95 minutes
- Country: South Africa
- Language: English

Nukie is a 1987 South African science fiction film directed by Sias Odendaal and Michael Pakleppa, and based on an original story by Odendaal, who also wrote the screenplay with Ben Taylor. The film stars Anthony Morrison, Steve Railsback, Ronald France, and Glynis Johns. The plot concerns an alien, Nukie, who crash lands on Earth and seeks help from two children to reunite with his brother, Miko, who has been captured by the US government.

The film was considered a knock-off of Steven Spielberg's 1982 film E.T. the Extra-Terrestrial and is also considered to be one of the worst films ever made.

== Plot ==
Two aliens, Nukie and Miko, crash on Earth and are separated. Nukie ends up in the African savanna while Miko falls into the hands of the Space Foundation in the United States. Miko reaches out to Nukie telepathically and informs him that he is being held captive. The head of the Space Foundation operation Dr. Glynn sends Dr. Eric Harvey to Nairobi to investigate the other crash site. During their experiments, the scientists discover that Miko is a being made of pure energy.

Nukie begins to explore his surroundings, coming across two children, Tiko and Toki, who can understand Nukie. He asks them for their help with finding America, but they run off vowing not to tell anybody about what has happened.

Sister Anne, the head of a Catholic mission, is contacted via radio to inform her that Dr. Harvey is on his way. Nukie comes across Charlie, a talking chimpanzee, who speaks to Nukie but he claims he does not know about America. The Corporal attempts to shoot Nukie, but he teleports out of harm's way and saves Tiko and Toki from a mountain lion. The boys then agree to help Nukie find America. Nukie attempts to commandeer Dr. Harvey's helicopter but crashes it.

At the Space Foundation, Miko has started to befriend the supercomputer, the Electronic Digital Data Intelligence computer (nicknamed E.D.D.I.), and convinces him to scan for Nukie. Dr. Harvey repairs the helicopter and takes off, tracking Nukie. Tiko and Toki are brought before the tribal chief Sangoma and are banished for bringing Nukie into their midst. The two later reunite with Nukie, who expresses disappointment over their banishment.

Tiko is bitten by a cobra and is taken back to the camp by Dr. Harvey while the Corporal arrives and shoots Nukie with tranquilizers. The tribe carries Nukie's unconscious body back to the village. Tiko tells Dr. Harvey and Sister Anne about Nukie's capture. E.D.D.I. attempts once more to scan for Nukie, and manages to lock in on Toki.

Toki discovers the tribe has Nukie imprisoned in a cage and sneaks into the Corporal's truck as he transports Nukie, later freeing him at a trading post with Charlie. The Corporal finds Toki and holds him at gunpoint as Nukie and Charlie escape. Sister Anne is alerted to the Corporal's presence and distracts him long enough to allow the pair to escape. Nukie finds Tiko at the infirmary and heals him as Toki and Charlie arrive. Toki and Nukie decide to leave Tiko to recover and set off to find America.

Sister Anne attempts to contact Dr. Harvey but finds out that he has left for America and that the Corporal has been trying to sell Nukie. E.D.D.I. attempts to free Miko, but cannot bypass the security system. Miko manages to escape with the help of Pamela Carter.

Nukie and Toki manage to evade the Corporal, who drives off the edge of a cliff into a river while attempting to run them down. Nukie ends up in the river too and goes over a waterfall, severely injuring him. Unable to contact Miko, Nukie suggests that the two of them try flying away. They manage to fly some of the way, but Nukie collapses from exhaustion and crashes.

Toki wishes for his family as well as Miko and Nukie to be with him. Following his wish, Tiko, their mother, and Sister Anne arrive. Tiko explains that Nukie is not a bad omen as the tribe claim, but a friend who is in need. Nukie then appears in his light form, and Dr. Harvey lands in his helicopter bringing Miko with him. Miko and Nukie greet each other and inform the humans that they have to leave. Charlie asks to join them, and the three turn into balls of light before flying away.

== Cast ==
- Anthony Morrison – Nukie & Miko
- Siphiwe Mlangeni – Tiko
- Sipho Mlangeni – Toki
- Glynis Johns – Sister Anne
- Steve Railsback – Dr. Eric Harvey
- Ronald France – The Corporal
- David Fox – Nukie
- Sam Ntsinyi – Sangoma
- Jabulile Phakane – Dube
- Fats Dibeco (as Fats Dibeko) – Mpefu
- Reed Evans – Dr. Barbara Rhinestone
- Carin C. Tietze – Pamela Carter
- Lester C. Muller – Dr. Norman Glynn
- Marcel Schneider – Officer Connally
- Calvin Burke (as Calvin E. Burke) – Dr. Bradley
- Nghaupe Pheto – Hunter
- Meshak Dlamini – Hunter
- Siphiwe Nyaosi – Mpadi
- Charlie the Chimpanzee (uncredited) – Charlie the Chimpanzee

== Production ==
Michael Pakleppa, a distributor of films in Germany, optioned Nukie long before it was shot and without reading the script; he was impressed by the poster, which gave the impression of E.T. the Extra-Terrestrial but in an African setting. Upon seeing the film, Pakleppa expressed surprise at the final product and commented on the viewing experience:

We thought we'd all die. There was no South Africa. There were hardly any extraterrestrials. We basically just saw discussions between a nun and a helicopter pilot, who were going on and on about how stupid Black people are, or something. Imagine that again and again and again, at extreme length, and nothing else.

After discussing the film with executive producer Gregory Cascante, the two attempted to create a new edit intended to remove material they considered racist; however, the effort resulted in only about 40 minutes of usable footage. Pakleppa subsequently made several trips to South Africa with a small crew and collaborated with the film’s writer and director, Sias Odendaal, in an attempt to salvage the project. During production, the crew encountered numerous technical difficulties, particularly with the alien animatronics, which were reportedly poorly constructed and designed to be operated by children. As a result, performers could only wear the suits for three to four minutes at a time before experiencing breathing difficulties. Following an extended post-production process, Pakleppa’s company declined to release the film theatrically, and it was instead distributed via television, with the foreign rights sold to various distributors.

== Reception ==
Witney Seibold of /Film writes that "Nukie is only remarkable for how undeniably terrible it is", noting that it appears on lists of the worst films ever made. Critic Brad Jones, the creator and star of the web series The Cinema Snob, selected Nukie as the worst film he has ever seen. British film magazine Total Film described Nukie as an "atrocity heralded by some as the 'most painful movie ever made'". Total Film listed it in separate articles as the worst kids movie ever made and one of the worst science-fiction films ever made. HUMO also included it on a list of the worst science-fiction movies ever made, while AlloCiné listed it as one of the worst films of the 1980s. An article by Screen Rant argued that Nukie should be "in the conversation" regarding what is the worst movie ever made, but that its relative obscurity to other contenders hinders it from being designated as such.

Simon Abrams of Politico compared Nukie to another film influenced by E.T. the Extra-Terrestrial, Mac and Me. Abrams wrote that Nukie was worse than Mac and Me, adding that it was "probably the most incompetent E.T. ripoff of any time period ... While Mac and Me was just rotten and ill-conceived, Nukie is uniquely perplexing." Comic Book Resources described it as E.T.'s "most infamous imitator" and reported that it is "regarded as one of the worst movies ever made".

== VHS auction ==
The Milwaukee-based production company Red Letter Media spent nearly a decade collecting Nukie VHS tapes after fans began mailing them copies of the film. Despite this, they never watched the film until December 2022, when they released a special episode about the practice of grading VHS tapes following a VHS copy of Back to the Future auctioning for $75,000. The group had one copy of the movie professionally graded, while the others were destroyed using a woodchipper to inflate the graded tape's value. The graded tape was then auctioned off on eBay with proceeds going to charity, selling for $80,600. The results of the auction made Nukie the most expensive VHS tape in history.

== See also ==
- List of 20th century films considered the worst
- Mockbuster
- Extra Terrestrial Visitors, also known as Pod People, an early E.T. imitation from 1983
