= Murder in the Family =

1938 film

- Opening titles
- Directed by: Albert Parker
- Written by: David Evans
- Based on: Murder in the Family by James Ronald
- Produced by: Albert Parker
- Starring: Barry Jones; Jessica Tandy; Evelyn Ankers
- Cinematography: Ronald Neame
- Edited by: Peter Tanner
- Production company: 20th Century Fox
- Distributed by: 20th Century Fox
- Release date: February 1938
- Running time: 75 minutes
- Country: United Kingdom
- Language: English

Murder in the Family is a 1938 British crime film directed by Albert Parker and starring Barry Jones, Jessica Tandy and Evelyn Ankers. It was written by David Evans adapted from the 1936 novel of the same title by James Ronald, and produced as a quota quickie. The film's sets were designed by the art director Carmen Dillon.

== Plot summary ==
Aunt Octavia is a wealthy, and far from pleasant, old lady. Visiting her half-brother Stephen Osborne, she discovers he has lost his job, leaving his family in dire straits. Yet she refuses any help. When castigated for her coldness, she spitefully revises her will, leaving to charity all the money she had originally intended to leave to Stephen. In the new will she also bequeaths a stipend of £1,000 a year to her maid, Miss Mimms. The latter, in lieu of gratitude, stabs and kills Octavia. Suspicion for the murder falls on the innocent Osborne family. Affected by the publicity, Stephen writes a false confession and attempts suicide by drinking poison. He survives, but Miss Mimms, dying in hospital, admits to the crime, revealing that she was disgusted by the mockery of Octavia's annual bequest to her, since Octavia knew that being ill she would not live long enough to enjoy the interitance.

== Cast ==
- Barry Jones as Stephen Osborne
- Jessica Tandy as Ann Osborne
- Jessie Winter as Edith Osborne
- Evelyn Ankers as Dorothy Osborne
- David Markham as Michael Osborne
- Glynis Johns as Marjorie Osborne
- Roddy McDowall as Peter Osborne
- Annie Esmond as Aunt Octavia
- Rani Waller as Miss Mimms
- Donald Gray as Ted Fleming
- A. Bromley Davenport as Mr Fleming
- Stella Arbenina as Mrs Fleming
- Edgar K. Bruce as Inspector Burrows
- David Arnold as the Major
- Claire Arnold as Hannah Gale
- Charles Childerstone as the doctor
- Bill Fraser as Sgt Feathers (credited as W. Simson Fraser)
- Wilfrid Hyde White as Purvitt (uncredited)

== Reception ==
The Monthly Film Bulletin wrote: "The film moves slowly and is of the stage-play kind, but good acting keeps up the interest. Barry Jones is convincing as Stephen Osborne: Jessica Tandy is good as the fiery Ann, and Evelyn Ankers is charming as Dorothy."

Kine Weekly wrote: "Harry Jones as inclined to be theatrical in his portrayal of Stephen, but in the main this is an unusually well-acted picture for its type. Jessica Tandy is outstanding in the role of Ann, which she invests with conviction and a strong sense of character. ... The main fault is pedestrian development and preponderance ot dialogue. Characters, however, are well drawn and the producers have achieved that rare feat in English films of presenting a believable English middle-class household."

The Daily Film Renter wrote: "Story has elements of human appeal and psychological note, though direction and script limitations affect dramatic values, acting being good in parts. General tone is sombre, but effort to develop real life theme lends interest to modest popular hall offering of type."

Picture Show wrote: "Competently acted, fairly well directed, it is lacking in thrills and suspense, and not too convincing."
