= Under Your Hat =

- Original British trade ad
- Directed by: Maurice Elvey
- Written by: Rodney Ackland; Anthony Kimmins; Arthur Macrae; Geoffrey Kerr; Jack Hulbert
- Based on: musical play Under Your Hat by Arthur Macrae
- Produced by: Ivor McLaren; Jack Hulbert
- Starring: Jack Hulbert; Cicely Courtneidge; Austin Trevor; Leonora Corbett
- Cinematography: Mutz Greenbaum
- Edited by: Edward B. Jarvis
- Music by: Lew Stone
- Production company: Grand National Pictures
- Distributed by: British Lion
- Release date: 1 September 1940
- Running time: 79 minutes
- Country: United Kingdom
- Language: English

Under Your Hat is a 1940 British musical comedy spy film directed by Maurice Elvey and starring Jack Hulbert, Cicely Courtneidge and Austin Trevor. It was written by Rodney Ackland, Anthony Kimmins, Arthur Macrae, Geoffrey Kerr and Hulbert.

== Synopsis ==
The film is set in pre-Second World War England where a leading film star Jack Millett and his wife Kay attempt to recover a secret carburettor stolen by enemy agents. Suspicious that Jack may be embarking on an affair with his glamorous co-star Carole Markoff, Kay follows him to the South of France, where in fact he is due to receive the carburettor from a contact at a night club, as he has actually been recruited as an undercover man for the government. Eventually, the parcel is retrieved, Markoff is revealed as a spy, and Jack and Kay fly back to London with the carburettor.

== Cast ==
- Jack Hulbert as Jack Millett
- Cicely Courtneidge as Kay Millett
- Austin Trevor as Boris Vladimir
- Leonora Corbett as Carole Markoff
- Cecil Parker as Sir Jeffrey Arlington
- Anthony Hayes as George
- Charles Oliver as Carl
- H. F. Maltby as Colonel Sheepshanks
- Mary Barton as Mrs. Sheepshanks
- Glynis Johns as Winnie
- Myrette Morven as Miss Stevens
- Roddy Hughes as film director
- John Robinson and The Rhythm Brothers as themselves
- Don Marino Baretto as band leader
- Paul Sheridan as minor role
- Eunice Crowther as minor role
- Charles Eaton as minor role
- Paul Henreid as minor role
- Terry-Thomas as party guest

== Production ==
The film was an independent production made at Isleworth Studios. It was based on a popular stage musical starring Hulbert and Courtneidge, a husband-and-wife team who had made a series of successful comedy films during the 1930s. The sets were designed by art director James A. Carter. Musical numbers included "Can't Find That Tiger" sung by The Rhythm Brothers.

== Critical reception ==
The Monthly Film Bulletin wrote: "It is a gay and cheerful film in which Jack Hulbert and Cicely Courtneidge share the honours and are as good as always whether on stage or screen. There are some very amusing interludes, the best being when they turn up at a girls' school disguised as an Indian Colonel and his wife asking after a non-existent daughter. The rest of the cast plays up well and the direction is very competent."

Kine Weekly wrote: "Scintillating musical comedy espionage burlesque, competently and ambitiously adapted from the persistent West End stage suvvess. ... The linking-up of the salient gags is a litte lacking in imagination – the director has taken the stage play a trifle too literally – but the gags themselves are really good. Fortunately, nothing can damp the high spirits of the stars or the play's inherent bubbling humour, and the two together make entertainment that goes with a swing."

The Radio Times Guide to Films David Parkinson gave the film 1/5 stars, writing: "You really needed to have been there at the time to appreciate the humour in this woeful comedy of errors. Wartime audiences were so grateful to see just about anything that they were willing to forgive even the most dismal movies – particularly morale-boosting flag-wavers. The lowest of many dips below zero is the scene in which Cicely Courtneidge poses as a French maid to catch hubby Jack Hulbert with Leonora Corbett."

Leslie Halliwell wrote: "Light-hearted adaptation of a stage musical, showing the stars in their best film form."

TV Guide found the film "redolent of the Thin Man series, with the added fillip of the musical-stage talent, but lacking the charisma of the stars of that series."

Sky Movies wrote, "although Jack Hulbert and Cicely Courtneidge had passed their mid-Thirties' peaks as box-office attractions when they made this film version of one of their hit stage shows, it does mark something of a return to form for both of them, with a lively if improbable plot involving spies, and the two stars cheerfully indulging their penchant for disguise. Glynis Johns has a small supporting role, and sharp eyes may catch a glimpse of the young Terry-Thomas."

== Bibliography ==
- Murphy, Robert. Realism and Tinsel: Cinema and Society in Britain, 1939-1949. Routledge, 1992.
