= The Adventures of Tartu =

1943 film by Harold S. Bucquet

- Directed by: Harold S. Bucquet
- Written by: John C. Higgins
- Screenplay by: John Lee Mahin; Howard Emmett Rogers; Miles Malleson (uncredited)
- Produced by: Irving Asher
- Starring: Robert Donat; Valerie Hobson; Walter Rilla; Glynis Johns
- Cinematography: John J. Cox
- Edited by: Douglas Myers
- Music by: Louis Levy; Hubert Bath
- Production company: Metro-Goldwyn-Mayer British Studios
- Distributed by: Loew's Inc.
- Release dates: 24 September 1943 (U.S.); 15 November 1943 (UK)
- Running time: 111 minutes (UK); 103 minutes (U.S.)
- Country: United Kingdom
- Language: English

The Adventures of Tartu (alternative British title and American release title: Sabotage Agent, also known as Tartu) is a 1943 British Second World War spy film directed by Harold S. Bucquet and starring Robert Donat. It was a morale booster of the era portraying Nazis as highly corruptible due to their desire to seduce women and to gain personal advancement.

== Plot ==
British Captain Terence Stevenson accepts an assignment even more dangerous than his everyday wartime job of defusing unexploded bombs. Fluent in Romanian and German and having studied chemical engineering, he is parachuted into Romania to assume the identity of Captain Jan Tartu, a member of the fascist Iron Guard. He makes his way to Czechoslovakia to steal the formula of a new Nazi poison gas and sabotage the chemical plant where it is being manufactured.

However, his contact is arrested before he can arrange for a job in the factory. Tartu is instead assigned work as a foreman at a munitions factory, where he is issued a German uniform. He is billeted in the house of Anna Palacek and her daughter Pavla, who works in the plant; also living there are German Inspector Otto Vogel and the lovely Maruschuka Lanova, who lives well by making herself popular with the German officers.

That day Pavla shoots a German who earlier had had the man she loved executed. Tartu provides her with an alibi, winning her trust, and then reveals himself as a secret agent. Needing to get into the chemical plant, he asks her help to contact the Czech underground, and is surprised when she contrives for him and Maruschuka to go on a date. They talk guardedly but make it clear they are both working against the Nazis.

At work the next day, Pavla is seen attempting sabotage. She whispers to Tartu to protect himself by denouncing her. He does, and she is summarily executed. The factory manager rewards Tartu by arranging the transfer he wants, to the chemical plant.

The same day, Maruschuka contacts Dr. Novotny, the leader of the local resistance group, and says she trusts Tartu. However they have already concluded that he had saved Pavla as a trick to win the confidence of the underground and order him killed. To arrange this while avoiding the execution of 200 Czechs by the Nazis in retribution, Maruschuka returns home and comes on seductively to Vogel. She tells him she is sure Tartu is a spy and Vogel says he will call the Gestapo. But she suggests Vogel advance his career by taking the initiative and killing Tartu himself. Vogel wants evidence, so she goes out again with Tartu that night, so that Vogel can overhear them talking. But they are interrupted before this can happen.

The next day, Tartu goes to work for Dr. Willendorf, the head of the chemical plant. He is dismayed to learn that the first shipment of gas is scheduled for the following night. Desperate to reach the resistance, he pretends to get drunk in a bar and brags that he knows of six Czech resistance members about to be arrested and killed. His idea works: he is abducted by the underground, and with a great deal of effort, finally convinces them they are on the same side. Working all night, they manufacture enough miniature bombs to demolish the plant if properly placed.

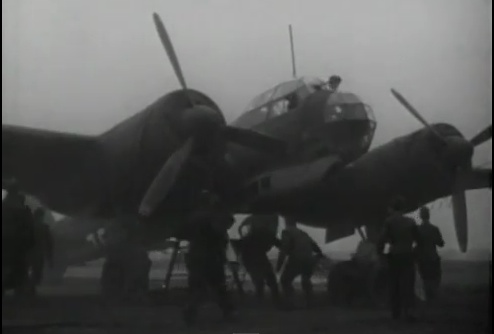
Screenshot of the climactic escape

At the Palacek house, Vogel checks up on Tartu's credentials and happily informs Maruschuka that Tartu is indeed a spy. She believes Vogel and, trying to stop him telling anyone else, accidentally kills him. She hurries to the chemical plant to warn Tartu that he is in danger. He sounds an air raid alarm and runs through the plant setting the bombs in their places. The Germans quickly realize he is a saboteur, but he just manages to complete his task and escape from the heavily guarded plant, which blows up as he is driven away.

Finally he, Maruschuka, and a pilot steal a German bomber and fly to safety as he proposes "just a simple little wedding".

== Cast ==
- Robert Donat as Captain Terence Stevenson
- Valerie Hobson as Maruschuka Lanova
- Walter Rilla as Inspector Otto Vogel
- Glynis Johns as Pavla Palacek
- Phyllis Morris as Anna Palacek
- Martin Miller as Dr. Novotny
- Anthony Eustrel as German Officer
- Percy Walsh as Dr. Willendorf
- David Ward as Bronte
- Mabel Terry-Lewis (credited as Mabel Terry Lewis) as Mrs. Stevenson
- Frederic Richter as General Weymouth
- John Penrose as Lieutenant in gas factory
- Hubert Leslie as Peter Valek
- Miki Iveria as Female worker at Skoda
- Lawrence O'Madden as Col. Perry
- Josephine Wilson as Nurse
- Maurice Rhodes as Boy patient

== Production ==
The Adventures of Tartu began life with the working title Sabotage Agent, while the title Tartu was also used. The film was released in England in late 1943 as Sabotage Agent, eight minutes longer (111 vs. 103 minutes) than the American release. The difference in running time is due to a number of short added scenes, mostly near the end of the film, plus the addition of dubbing, alternate and extended shots throughout the film. A different exterior factory shot is seen exploding in each film. (Note: A scene with Donat's mother played by Mabel Terry-Lewis is eliminated in the American version.) Principal photography took place in July and August 1942 at Gainsborough's Islington Studios, London. It was the first MGM-British production in two years, with an American director but an all-British cast, featuring Donat, whose last film, The Young Mr. Pitt, like The Adventures of Tartu, was a propaganda film. An unusual use of a captured Junkers Ju 88 bomber in Luftwaffe markings is featured. Use of archival film from the London Blitz and of a Messerschmitt Bf 110 fighter also lends an air of authenticity. (Note: A Junkers Ju 88 A-4 (4D+DL), EE205: Formerly of 3./KG 30, landed by mistake at RAF Lulsgate Bottom, after a night raid on Birkenhead on 23/24 July 1941. No. 1426 (Enemy Aircraft) Flight, nicknamed the RAFwaffe at RAF Duxford, from 1941, flew captured enemy aircraft, including the Ju 88 and Bf 110 C–4 seen in The Adventures of Tartu.)

== Reception ==
The New York Times called The Adventures of Tartu a film that "frequently and unabashedly places a strain on the audience's credulity", and the "script is so full of holes it could be used for a sieve". However, it also admitted that, "for all its excesses, it still packs a fair load of excitement ..." and "is fun ... due largely to the gusto that Mr. Donat brings to the film." Variety reviewed the film on 4 August 1943. Later reviews considered the light fare at least a pleasurable Donat feature, enriched by his "lively performance."

Kinematograph Weekly listed a series of films that were "runners up" in its survey of the most popular films in Britain in 1943: The Gentle Sex, The Lamp Still Burns, Dear Octopus and The Adventures of Tartu.
