= Don't Just Stand There! =

1968 film by Ron Winston

- Theatrical release poster
- Directed by: Ron Winston
- Screenplay by: Charles Williams
- Based on: The Wrong Venus by Charles Williams
- Produced by: Stan Margulies
- Starring: Robert Wagner; Mary Tyler Moore; Glynis Johns; Harvey Korman; Barbara Rhoades; Vincent Beck
- Cinematography: Milton Krasner
- Edited by: Richard Bracken
- Music by: Nick Perito
- Production company: Universal Pictures
- Distributed by: Universal Pictures
- Release date: May 1, 1968
- Running time: 99 minutes
- Country: United States
- Language: English

Don't Just Stand There! is a 1968 American comedy film directed by Ron Winston and starring Robert Wagner, Mary Tyler Moore, Glynis Johns, Harvey Korman, Barbara Rhoades and Vincent Beck. It was written by Charles Williams, based on his 1966 novel The Wrong Venus. It was released on May 1, 1968, by Universal Pictures.

== Plot ==
A famous author, Sabine Manning, has yet to finish her latest sex-themed novel and is on a European cruise with Merriman Dudley, her manager and lover. Her exasperated publisher Martine Randall, in an exchange of favors, asks adventurer Lawrence Colby to pursue her. Colby discovers that Kendall Flanagan, mistaken for Sabine, has been kidnapped.

Kendall's karate skills help her escape when Colby comes to her rescue. Colby learns that Sabine no longer wants to write about sex, so he urges her to finish the completed novel under a pseudonym. Kendall complicates matters by becoming involved in another gangster's crime, but Colby is ultimately able to get everything settled.

== Cast ==
- Robert Wagner as Lawrence Colby
- Mary Tyler Moore as Martine Randall
- Glynis Johns as Sabine Manning
- Harvey Korman as Merriman Dudley
- Barbara Rhoades as Kendall Flanagan
- Vincent Beck as painter
- Joseph V. Perry as Jean-Jacques
- Stuart Margolin as Remy
- Émile Genest as Henri
- David Mauro as Jules
- Penny Santon as Renée
- Joseph Bernard as Police Inspector

== Reception ==
Boxoffice wrote: "Never serious, this film has no 'message' – it is designed only to entertain. If you find zany characters in zany situations amusing, then you will want to see this picture. A kind of non-crime whodunit, with comic-opera villains, the plot is unique, though at times confusing. This is not an edge-of-the-seat, fingernail-biting type of hilarious intrigue and misguided incidents that are mostly accidents. Rather it is the lean-back-and-laugh kind."

Variety wrote: "Don't Just Stand There, a title connoting some comedic promise, is mildly amusing but frequently goes overboard in its quest of daffiness. Screenplay by Charles Williams, adapted from his novel, The Wrong Venus very likely read well. The way it plays, however, the audience is as confused and mixed up as the various protagonists headed by Robert Wagner and Mary Tyler Moore."

== Production ==
Director Ron Winston (1932-1973) had worked with star Robert Wagner the previous year in the Universal Pictures country-club drama Banning.

== Home Media ==
To date, Don't Just Stand There! has never had a legal home video release on any format in any country.
