= An Ideal Husband (1947 British film) =

- Original French film poster
- Directed by: Alexander Korda
- Screenplay by: Lajos Bíró
- Based on: An Ideal Husband; 1895 play by Oscar Wilde
- Produced by: Alexander Korda
- Starring: Paulette Goddard; Michael Wilding; Diana Wynyard
- Cinematography: Georges Périnal
- Edited by: Oswald Hafenrichter
- Music by: Arthur Benjamin
- Color process: Technicolor
- Production company: London Film Productions
- Distributed by: British Lion Films Corporation (UK); 20th Century Fox (US)
- Release dates: 13 November 1947 (London); 14 November 1947 (United Kingdom); 14 January 1948 (New York City); February 1948 (United Kingdom)
- Running time: 96 minutes
- Country: United Kingdom
- Language: English
- Budget: £506,000
- Box office: £241,994 (UK) or £206,637 (worldwide)

An Ideal Husband, also known as Oscar Wilde's An Ideal Husband, is a 1947 British comedy film adaptation of the 1895 play by Oscar Wilde. It was made by London Film Productions and distributed by British Lion Films (UK) and Twentieth Century-Fox Film Corporation (United States). It was produced and directed by Alexander Korda from a screenplay by Lajos Bíró from Wilde's play. The music score was by Arthur Benjamin, the cinematography by Georges Périnal, the editing by Oswald Hafenrichter and the costume design by Cecil Beaton. This was Korda's last completed film as a director, although he continued producing films into the next decade.

The film stars Paulette Goddard, Michael Wilding, Diana Wynyard, Hugh Williams, C. Aubrey Smith, Glynis Johns and Constance Collier.

== Plot ==
The story takes place in London, 1895. The main characters are Mrs. Laura Cheveley, who has recently returned to Britain after living in Vienna; Sir Robert Chiltern, a government minister with a reputation for honesty; his wife Gertrude, who disapproves strongly of immorality and dishonesty; Mabel Chiltern, Sir Robert's younger sister; Arthur, Viscount Goring, an unmarried and unconventional young man; and his father, the Earl of Caversham, who is eager to have his son marry and settle down.

At a lavish party hosted by the Chilterns, Mrs. Cheveley tries to extort Sir Robert into supporting a bill to provide government financing for what he considers to be a fraudulent scheme. Mrs. Cheveley has incriminating letters that he wrote many years earlier that allowed him to use advance knowledge of the financing of the Suez Canal to establish his fortune and career. He initially refuses but gives in to save his reputation. Before leaving the party, Mrs. Cheveley tells Lady Chiltern, a former schoolmate, that her husband will support the canal scheme, which surprises the politician's wife. As the party ends, Arthur and Mabel notice an unusual brooch that someone had lost. Goring knows that he had given that brooch to someone in the past and keeps it, hoping that it will be asked for. Sir Robert, confronted by his wife about his change of position, writes a letter to Lady Cheveley to tell her that he will speak against the bill.

The next morning, Sir Robert reveals Mrs. Cheveley's blackmail attempt to Arthur, who urges him to let his wife know about his own past indiscretion, even if it will ruin her regard for her husband. Sir Robert refuses to tell her the truth and decides to look for some way to blackmail Mrs. Cheveley instead. Arthur, who was once engaged to her, thinks that plan will not work. Mrs. Cheveley arrives to ask if anyone has found a brooch she had lost at the party. Lady Chiltern tells the woman that she has despised her dishonesty ever since they were at school together and that Sir Robert will speak against the bill in Parliament that night. Mrs. Cheveley retaliates by telling her how her husband made his fortune. Sir Robert orders Mrs. Cheveley to leave. His wife is repelled by his past behavior and he says that no one could live up to the ideal image she had of him.

That evening, Lady Chiltern writes an unsigned note to Arthur asking for his help. Arthur tells Mrs. Cheveley that he has her brooch and knows that she stole it from an important society woman. He removes the incriminating brooch when she gives him the letter she was using to blackmail Sir Robert. She, however, takes Lady Chiltern's note as she leaves, planning to use it to make Sir Robert believe that his wife is having an affair with Arthur. Lady Chiltern in turn says that she has learned the power of forgiveness.

That night, Mrs. Cheveley watches from the women's gallery in the House of Commons as Sir Robert denounces the canal scheme. The next day, Lord Caversham again admonishes his son to marry. Arthur complies and proposes to Mabel. Lady Chiltern arrives and Arthur tells her of Mrs. Cheveley's intention to destroy her marriage, using the unsigned note. When she gives it to Sir Robert, though, he takes the letter to be proof of his wife's need and love for him. Now willing to give up his position in society and live a contented life with Lady Chiltern, Sir Robert is offered an important Cabinet position by Lord Caversham. Arthur persuades her to let her husband remain in public life. Mrs. Cheveley leaves, not apparently upset that her schemes have failed.

== Cast ==
- Paulette Goddard as Mrs. Laura Cheveley
- Michael Wilding as Arthur, Viscount Goring
- Diana Wynyard as Gertrude, Lady Chiltern
- Hugh Williams as Sir Robert Chiltern
- C. Aubrey Smith as the Earl of Caversham, Lord Goring's Father
- Glynis Johns as Miss Mabel Chiltern, Sir Robert's sister
- Constance Collier as Lady Markby
- Christine Norden as Mrs. Margaret Marchmont
- Harriette Johns as Olivia, Countess of Basildon
- Michael Medwin as the Duke of Nonesuch
- Michael Anthony as Vicomte de Nanjac
- Peter Hobbes as Mr. Eddie Montford
- John Clifford as Mr. Mason, the Chiltern Butler
- Fred Groves as Phipps, Goring's Butler
- Michael Ward as Mr. Tommy Tafford

== Production ==
The costly production was held up due to a strike by the crew. The union objected to American actress Paulette Goddard's personal, Swedish-born hairdresser, claiming an English person could do the job. Korda was also criticised for halting shooting to procure a genuine emerald necklace for Goddard to wear in one scene, a controversial extravagance during Britain's post-war austerity period. However, Korda's use of the Royal Household Cavalry in an outdoor scene was so impressive that the company wore the uniforms from the film for the royal wedding of Princess Elizabeth to Philip, Duke of Edinburgh.

Shooting took 66 days. Goddard's husband, Burgess Meredith, was making Mine Own Executioner for Korda at the same time. After filming, the two of them appeared on stage in Dublin in Winterset.

== Reception ==
The film, along with two others from Korda, Mine Own Executioner and Anna Karenina, as well as other British films, were picketed in some American cities by the Sons of Liberty Boycott Committee, headed by Johan J. Smertenko, who was active in supporting the establishment of the State of Israel. The group wanted to draw American attention to British policies in the Palestine Mandate. Korda, however, suggested that the boycott might also be used by American interests in retaliation for distribution quotas imposed on American films by Britain. The film's American distributor, Twentieth Century Fox, did pull Korda's films from its theaters. Smertenko and the Sons of Liberty announced an end to the boycott in December 1948.

=== Box office ===
The film was one of the most popular movies at the British box office in 1948. According to Kinematograph Weekly, the most successful at the box office in 1948 Britain was The Best Years of Our Lives, with Spring in Park Lane being the best British film and next best being It Always Rains on Sunday, My Brother Jonathan, Road to Rio, Miranda, An Ideal Husband, The Naked City, The Red Shoes, Green Dolphin Street, Forever Amber, Life with Father, The Weaker Sex, Oliver Twist, The Fallen Idol and The Winslow Boy.

As of 30 June 1949 the film earned £215,555 in the UK of which £149,559 went to the producer. The film had made a loss of £356,411.

However, it performed disappointingly in other markets.
