= Dear Mr. Prohack =

1949 British film by Thornton Freeland

- Directed by: Thornton Freeland
- Written by: Donald Bull; Ian Dalrymple
- Based on: the novel Mr. Prohack by Arnold Bennett and the play by Edward Knoblock
- Produced by: Ian Dalrymple
- Starring: Cecil Parker; Glynis Johns; Hermione Baddeley; Dirk Bogarde; Sheila Sim
- Cinematography: H.E. Fowle
- Edited by: Sidney Stone
- Music by: Temple Abady
- Production company: Wessex Film Productions
- Distributed by: General Film Distributors (UK); Paramount Pictures (USA)
- Release dates: 7 September 1949 (London, UK); 14 July 1950 (New York, USA)
- Running time: 91 minutes
- Country: United Kingdom
- Language: English

Dear Mr. Prohack is a 1949 British comedy film directed by Thornton Freeland and starring Cecil Parker, Glynis Johns and Dirk Bogarde. It is a modern-day version of Arnold Bennett's 1922 novel Mr Prohack, as adapted in the play by Edward Knoblock.

== Plot ==
Arthur Prohack, a Treasury civil servant who is extremely frugal with the government's money, suddenly inherits £250,000 and is convinced to go on six months' sick leave. His children Charles and Mary tap him for money for an investment scheme and a theatrical production respectively, whilst his wife Eve buys the family a far larger house, which she fills with an aviary and then aquariums. Charles also buys his father a new car, which on its first drive is involved in an accident with Mimi Warburton. Initially frosty, he takes her on as his private secretary. Charles cancels a meeting with Arthur and arranges a board meeting without him - in vengeance Mimi arranges for Arthur 'accidentally' to take Charles' place at a meeting with Lady Maslam, Charles' patroness. Left behind at home, Charles and Mimi lunch together and fall in love, leading her to try to tender her resignation, as on first taking the job with Arthur she had agreed not to fall in love with Charles.

Arthur's friend Sir Paul Spinner arranges to invest some of Arthur's money, whilst Eve arranges an elaborate party to celebrate Mary's engagement to Oswald Morfrey, a sickly but forthright junior official at the Ministry of Agriculture. However, breaking free of Mary's theatrical connections, the couple instead run away together and get married without their parents' knowledge. Arthur hunts them down but Oswald refuses his help. Soon afterwards Spinner informs Arthur that a run on the stock-market means all the money he invested may be lost. Mimi discovers that the investment scheme is also about to be ruined and argues with him at Lady Maslam's home, to which he had just gone to beg Lady Maslam's help.

Relieved he is about to be free of the troubles of his new fortune, Arthur retires to bed with a cold and has a fever dream inspired by Arthurian legends on the BBC Third Programme. Mimi wakes him to tell him that Charles has broken up with her and is about to flee to Paris with Lady Maslam, but when Arthur rushes to the airport this proves to be a misunderstanding – Charles has not boarded Lady Maslam's plane and returns home with Arthur to propose to Mimi. Arthur discovers that although Spinner's advice has ruined Charles' scheme, Spinner has in fact managed to avoid the crash himself and make Arthur another £250,000. Arthur reconciles with Eve and makes plans to move back to their old house and help Oswald, Mary and Charles to more stable and healthy homes and jobs. He then returns to work and anonymously donates the new £250,000 to the Treasury under the guise of a massive repayment of back-taxes.

== Cast ==
(in credits order)

- Cecil Parker as Arthur Prohack
- Glynis Johns as Mimi Warburton
- Hermione Baddeley as Eve Prohack
- Dirk Bogarde as Charles Prohack
- Sheila Sim as Mary Prohack
- Heather Thatcher as Lady Maslam
- Frances Waring as Nursie
- Charles Goldner as Polish manservant
- Campbell Cotts as Sir Paul Spinner
- Denholm Elliott as Oswald Morfrey
- Russell Waters as Cartwright
- Henry Edwards as Sir Digby Bunce
- Frederick Valk as Dr. Viega
- James Hayter as Carrell Quire
- Bryan Forbes as Tony
- Jon Pertwee as Plover
- Ada Reeve as Mrs. Griggs
- Judith Furse as Laura Postern
- Frederick Leister as The Director General
- Elwyn Brook-Jones as Benny Erivangian
- Eric Berry as tailor's assistant (uncredited)
- Janet Burnell as Mr. Prohack's personal assistant (uncredited)
- Ian Carmichael as hat salesman (uncredited)
- Anne Gunning as actress (uncredited)
- Humphrey Heathcote as Turkish bath attendant (uncredited)
- Sam Lysons as club porter (uncredited)
- Desmond Newling as pageboy (uncredited)
- Lloyd Pearson as Mr. Bishop (uncredited)
- Charles Perry as butler (uncredited)
- Stanelli as orchestra leader (uncredited)
- Jerry Verno as taxi driver (uncredited)

== Critical reception ==
The Monthly Film Bulletin wrote:

The earlier sections of the film are sporadically amusing and the idiosyncrasies of Government officials and private individuals nicely observed; but jokes of this kind at the expense of the Civil Service (to whom the film is dedicated), of social or domestic behaviour, pall before long, and need more than well-timed comedy acting by Cecil Parker and Hermione Baddeley and some likeable small part players to save them from banality. The film tails off uncomfortably into farce with an embarrassingly unfunny dream sequence, which emphasises that the director lacks the satirical feeling needed to give the film real point and sharpness.

The New York Times wrote: "It's an Arnold Bennett novel "modernized"—and it shows its age in this translation."

TV Guide described it as a "Mediocre comedy with an excellent cast, including Denholm Elliott in his debut."

Britmovie wrote, "Cecil Parker gives one of his best performances replicating his stage role."

In British Sound Films: The Studio Years 1928–1959 David Quinlan rated the film as "average", writing, "Amusing central situation gradually wears thin."
