= There Ain't No Justice =

- Trade show advertisement
- Directed by: Pen Tennyson
- Written by: Novel & screenplay: James Curtis; Sergei Nolbandov; Pen Tennyson
- Produced by: Michael Balcon
- Starring: Jimmy Hanley; Edward Chapman; Edward Rigby; Michael Wilding
- Cinematography: Mutz Greenbaum
- Edited by: Ray Pitt
- Music by: Ernest Irving
- Production company: Ealing Studios
- Distributed by: ABFD
- Release date: June 1939
- Running time: 83 minutes
- Country: United Kingdom
- Language: English
- Budget: £19,883

There Ain't No Justice is a 1939 British sports drama film directed by Pen Tennyson and starring Jimmy Hanley, Edward Chapman and Edward Rigby. It was written by James Curtis, Tennyson and Sergei Nolbandov based on the 1937 novel of the same name by Curtis.

== Plot summary ==
Tommy Mutch is a garage mechanic and small-time boxer. With his family in financial difficulty he needs to find money in a hurry. As luck would have it he meets boxing manager Sammy Sanders. Sammy assures Tommy he can get him lucrative main event bouts.

Tommy is promoted as the next boxing star which is reinforced with a series of convincing wins. However, Tommy discovers that the bouts were fixed by a gambling syndicate. He realises now that he has been set up by his manager and is expected to take a fall.

He has little choice but to go-ahead but needs to come up with a plan. One that will guarantee a financial return for his family while also hitting the syndicates in the pocket.

== Cast ==
- Jimmy Hanley as Tommy Mutch
- Edward Rigby as Pa Mutch
- Mary Clare as Ma Mutch
- Phyllis Stanley as Elsie Mutch
- Edward Chapman as Sammy Sanders
- Jill Furse as Connie Fletcher
- Nan Hopkins as Dot Ducrow
- Richard Ainley as Billy Frist
- Gus McNaughton as Alfie Norton
- Sue Gawthorne as Mrs. Frost
- Michael Hogarth as Frank Fox
- Michael Wilding as Len Charteris
- Richard Norris as Stan
- Al Millen as Perce
- John Boxer as Mr Short
- James Knight as Police Constable

== Production ==
James Curtis adapted his own novel, There Ain't No Justice to provide the screenplay for the film. He had done so the year before for one of his own novels, They Drive By Night, for the film of the same name. As with that adaptation he found himself having to remove areas of dialogue and story that would not get by the censors of the time. Many of these would be depictions of graphic violence against men rather than the sexual nature of his previous novel.

This was the first film directed by Pen Tennyson, who had served as Assistant Director to Alfred Hitchcock from 1934. He would go on to direct two further films before being killed during World War II.

Michael Balcon wrote "The story was not outstanding from a film point of view but it had excellent characterisation and dialogue, and the atmosphere was wonderfully authentic. The strength of the story lay in its honest and realistic portrayal of the life of a Cockney family—much more remarkable in screen entertainment then than it had been in recent years."

The film features an uncredited role by real life boxer Bombardier Billy Wells, best remembered as one of the gongmen featured in the Rank Organisation films logo.

== Release ==
It was released theatrically in the UK with the slogan "Real people, Real problems, a human document".

It was shown in May 2010 as part of BFI Southbank's "Capital Tales" season.

== Reception ==
The Monthly Film Bulletin wrote: "On the surface 'just another boxing drama', actually this film has much more to it than that. It is an extraordinarily vital and accurate picture of everyday working-class life as it is lived, and not as it is imagined. It has humour, pathos, racy dialogue, and in numerous slight but deft touches reveals Cockney wit and grit. The boxing ring is authentic and the small street backgrounds realistic. The acting is in keeping. Jimmy Hanley gets inside the part of Tommy. He acts simply and sincerely, and fights gamely. Edward Rigby and Mary Clare as his parents give brilliant little cameos, and the supporting players are well in the picture."

Kine Weekly wrote: "Boxing comedy melodrama dedicated to those who fight with their fists to win. The honour of pugilism is not the picture's only commitment; it also shows the proletariat at home, at work and at play. Its cross sections of low life are interesting, human and amusing and, what is more they are backed up by rousing fisticuffs and accurate characterisation. In short, it's a human and entertaining sketch-book with box-office characteristics."

Variety wrote: "Jimmy Hanley has all the signs of a new star. ... The beginning contains foo much cockney conversation to be readily understood by the majority of theatregoers, having no bearing on the progression of the plot, but merely contributes to atmospheric details. A reduction from 83 minutes fo 70 should make thisa fast-moving popular feature in this country and a good second feature abroad."

== Home media ==
The film is available on DVD in the UK on Volume Eight of Network's Ealing Studios Rarities Collection.

== See also ==
- List of boxing films
