= John King (author) =

English writer (born 1960)

- Born: 1960 (age 65–66)
- Occupations: Author; publisher; editor
- Writing career
- Language: English
- Notable works: The Football Factory; Headhunters; England Away; Human Punk; White Trash; The Prison House; Skinheads; The Liberal Politics of Adolf Hitler; Slaughterhouse Prayer
- Website: john-king-author.co.uk

John King (born 1960) is an English writer best known for his novels which mostly deal in the more rebellious elements driving the country's culture. His stories carry strong social and political undercurrents, and his work has been widely translated abroad. He has written articles and reviews for alternative and mainstream publications, edits the fiction journal Verbal, and is the co-owner of the London Books publishing house.

== Career ==
=== Novels ===
King's 1996 debut novel, The Football Factory, was an instant word-of-mouth success, selling around 300,000 copies in the UK. The book was subsequently turned into a play by Brighton Theatre Events, with German and Dutch adaptations following. A film adaptation appeared in 2004. Directed by Nick Love and starring Danny Dyer, Dudley Sutton, and Frank Harper, its UK DVD sales passed the two-million mark.

Prior to the novel's release, an early version of the chapter "Millwall Away" appeared in Rebel Inc. This magazine also published early writing by Irvine Welsh and Alan Warner, and all three would subsequently join the Jonathan Cape publishing house. King was producing the fanzine Two Sevens, and Rebel Inc editor Kevin Williamson's fiction was featured, along with interviews with Welsh and the novelist Stewart Home. Following its publication, extracts from The Football Factory featured in issue 59 of the New York literary journal Grand Street.

Two more novels —Headhunters and England Away—develop the themes of alienation and belonging found in The Football Factory, and the three books form a loose trilogy. Street newspaper The Big Issue described Headhunters as: "Sexy, dirty, violent, sad and funny; in fact, it has just about everything you could want from a book on contemporary working-class life in London".

King's fourth novel, Human Punk (2000), draws on the emergence and evolution of punk rock as it tells the story of four boyhood friends; it is set in and around the town of Slough.

White Trash (2002), which the author has described as "a defence of the NHS", drew the following praise from Alan Sillitoe, author of Saturday Night and Sunday Morning: "Complete and unique, all stitched up and marvellous, the two sides of the equation brought together, realistic yet philosophical". In The Independent, Mat Coward wrote: "The cumulative effect of King's style, with streams of monologue, alternating between Ruby and Jeffreys, is astonishingly powerful in its detail and depth... This is an immensely timely and necessary book: stylish, witty and passionate. It's about time someone slapped the smugness from the face of broadsheet Britain".

The one novel of King's to be set entirely outside England, The Prison House (2004), takes place in an old castle prison in an unnamed country. Brian Keenan wrote: "With a brutal imagination The Prison House takes you to a place where angels fear to tread. Go there and be redeemed". Boyd Tonkin, writing in The Independent, said: "In this literary jail, the ghost of Kafka shares a cell with the shade of Burroughs".

Skinheads (2008) is set in the same landscapes as Human Punk and White Trash, and while the three books feature different characters, they effectively combine to provide an overview of forty years of British culture and politics as The Satellite Cycle. In his review of the novel, Charles Shaar Murray stated: "John King's achievement since his debut has been enormous: creating a modern, proletarian English literature at once genuinely modern, genuinely proletarian, genuinely literature". The US edition of Human Punk carries the following quote by Lars Frederiksen of the American punk band Rancid: "John King: the face in our subculture who lives what he writes".

The Liberal Politics of Adolf Hitler (2016) takes place fifty years in the future. The Morning Star wrote: "King steadily constructs, layer by layer, an increasingly believable world where a combination of intrusive technology, ruthlessness and effectively bland public relations has ensured the domination of the majority's thoughts and actions." Author David Peace called it "One of the best, if not the best, bravest and most exciting books I've read in years—needed saying, needed writing and needs to be read".

Slaughterhouse Prayer (2018) is an animal rights story based around three stages in the life of the main character, and how he responds to the meat and dairy industries as a boy, youth, and man. The novel was reviewed in New Statesman.

King's tenth novel, London Country (2023), develops themes from his earlier Satellite Cycle titles Human Punk, White Trash, and Skinheads. It is set in the same areas in and around Slough, Uxbridge, and Outer London, and charts the political, social, and cultural shifts of 2015, 2017, and 2019, as experienced by those books' main characters Joe Martin, Ruby James, and Ray English. The original focus of those books is brought forward, namely, the repetition of trauma and evolution of punk, the NHS and Spiritualist Church, the skinhead scene, and family bonds.

=== Other writing and activities ===
In the early 1990s, King was co-founder and co-editor, with Peter Mason, of Two Sevens, a small-press magazine that focused on popular culture, in particular punk and alternative music, street literature, and politics.

In 2007, King set up the independent publishing company London Books with Martin Knight.

King has written for a range of newspapers, magazines, and fanzines over the years, and has contributed to New Statesman in the UK, la Repubblica in Italy, and Le Monde in France. His small-press publication Verbal publishes new fiction and includes an author interview in each issue.

In 2020, the novella The Beasts of Brussels was published as part of The Seal Club, a three-piece collection that also includes The Providers by Irvine Welsh and Those Darker Sayings by Alan Warner. Grand Union (2023) appears in The View From Poacher's Hill, again with work by Welsh and Warner. A third novella, Peekaboo Bosh, was released in 2025 and includes the short story "Roadblock 2am".

== Bibliography ==
=== Novels ===
- The Football Factory (1996)
- Headhunters (1998)
- England Away (1999)
- Human Punk (2000)
- White Trash (2002)
- The Prison House (2004)
- Skinheads (2008)
- The Liberal Politics of Adolf Hitler (2016)
- Slaughterhouse Prayer (2018)
- London Country (2023)

=== Novellas ===
- The Beasts of Brussels (The Seal Club, 2020)
- Grand Union (Seal Club: The View From Poacher's Hill, 2023)
- Peekaboo Bosh (2025)

=== Collections ===
- Machine Elves Descending (2026)

=== Short stories ===
- "Millwall Away" (Rebel Inc., 1995)
- "Last Rites" (Rovers Return, 1998)
- "Space Junk" (Intoxication, 1998)
- "Bulldog Bobby" (Verbal, 2000)
- "Last Train Home" (la Repubblica, 2008)
- "The Penalty" (High Life, 2010)
- "See No Evil" (More Raw Material, 2015)
- "The Terror Fantastic" (PUSH 2, 2015)
- "Blue-Eyed Girl" (Twenty Shades of Psycho, 2016)
- "Friday Night" (w/Jaimie MacDonald, Hull International Photography Festival, 2017)
- "Hard but Fair" (Denizen of the Dead, 2020)
- "Drawing Breath" (The Middle of a Sentence, 2020)
- "Johnny Wayne Rocks" (Songs from the Underground, 2022)

=== Nonfiction ===
- Repetitive Beat Generation (Interview/collected authors, ed. Steve Redhead, 1998)
- The Special Ones (Editor with Martin Knight, 2007)
- London Fictions (Essay/collected essays, ed. Andrew Whitehead & Jerry White, 2013)
- PUSH 2 (Interview/anthology, ed. Joe England, 2015)

=== Introductions ===
- "The Gentleman Footballer" (The Working Man's Ballet by Alan Hudson, 2017)
- "From Cradle to Grave" (White Trash, US edition, 2016)
- "In England's Fair City" (Headhunters, US edition, 2016)
- "Two Sevens Clash" (Human Punk, US edition, 2015)
- "Come Running After You" (The Football Factory, US edition, 2015)
- PUSH (Anthology, East London Press, 2014)
- May Day by John Sommerfield (London Classics, 2010)
- Night and the City by Gerald Kersh (London Classics, 2007 & British Fiction, 2020)
- The Road to Los Angeles by John Fante (Rebel Inc/Canongate, 2000)
- Hoolifan by Martin King and Martin Knight (Mainstream, 1999)

== Critical studies ==
- Mark Schmitt: British White Trash: Figurations of Tainted Whiteness in the Novels of Irvine Welsh, Niall Griffiths and John King. Bielefeld: Transcript, 2018.
