= List of people from Chichester =

Chichester is a cathedral city in West Sussex, England. The following is a list of those people who were either born or live in Chichester, or had some important contribution to make to the town.

== Notable people from Chichester ==
Table of contents:

A B C D E F G H I J K L M N O P Q R S T U V W X Y Z

== A ==
- Alan Arnell (1935–2013) - Association Football Player
- Michael Ashcroft (born 1946) - Pollster, Businessman and Conservative Peer

== B ==
- Harriet Barber (1968–2014) - painter
- Geoffrey Beevers (born 1941) - actor
- John Blund (c. 1175 – 1248) - philosopher
- Cordelia Bugeja (born 1976) - actress
- John Bullokar (1574–1627) - physician and lexicographer
- Bo Bragason (born 2004) - actress

== C ==
- William Cawley (1602–1667) - politician; signatory to death warrant of King Charles I
- Steve Clamp (born 1976) - freelance journalist and newsreader
- Tiberius Claudius Cogidubnus - local ruler in Roman Britain
- William Clowes (1779–1847) - printer
- William Collins (1721–1759) - poet.
- Holly Colvin (born 1989) - cricketer
- Richard Cudmore (1787–1840) - violinist
- Vincent Cushing (born 1950) - cricketer

== E ==
- Harvey Lonsdale Elmes (1813–1847) - architect
- Michael Elphick (1946–2002) - actor
- David Emms (1925–2015) - rugby union player and educationalist

== F ==
- Justin Fitzpatrick (born 1973) - rugby union player and Major League Rugby coach
- Mike Friday (born 1972) - rugby union player and coach
- J.F.C. Fuller (1878–1966) - Army officer (major-general) and historian

== G ==
- Harry Gregson-Williams (born 1961) - composer, orchestrator, conductor, and music producer
- Rupert Gregson-Williams (born 1966) - composer

== H ==
- Jamie Hall (born 1968) - cricketer
- Lisa Hammond (actress), born 1983
- Ian Hannah (1874–1944) - academic, writer, politician
- Charles Harington (1872–1940) - Army officer in World War I
- Edward Harrison (1910–2002) - cricketer and squash player
- Charlotte Hawkins (born 1975) - Sky News presenter
- Giles Haywood (born 1979) - former Sussex and Nottinghamshire cricketer
- Sean Heather (born 1982) - cricketer
- Antony Hegarty (born 1971) - singer
- Andrew Hodd (born 1984) - cricketer
- Alex Horne (born 1978) - comedian
- Charlie Howard (1854–1929) - cricketer
- Jim Howick (born 1979) - comedian and writer

== J ==
- William Juxon (1582–1663) - Archbishop of Canterbury

== K ==
- Joseph Kelway (c. 1702–1782)- Harpsichordist, Organist Composer
- Jarvis Kenrick (1852–1949) - association football player

== L ==
- Jennifer Lash (1939–1993) - novelist and painter
- Lord Henry Lennox (1821–1886) - politician
- Morgan Lewington - Canadian TV and film producer
- Robert Ballard Long (1771–1825) - Army officer

== M ==
- Kate Mosse (born 1961) - author, playwright and broadcaster

== N ==
- Ralph Neville (died 1244) - Bishop of Chichester and Lord Chancellor of England
- Adrian Noble (born 1950) - theatre director

== O ==
- Tom Odell (born 1990) - singer-songwriter; winner of the 2013 Critics' Choice BRIT Award

== P ==
- Timothy Peake (born 1972) - astronaut

== R ==
- Zoe Rahman - jazz pianist
- Leslie Rands (1900–1972) - opera singer
- Mark Roberts (born 1961) - archaeologist

== S ==
- Richard Seaman (1913–1939) - Grand Prix driver
- Ros Simmons - CEO of Vie at Home
- George Smith (1713/14–1776) - landscape painter
- Edward Speleers (born 1988) - actor
- Paul Steinitz (1909–1988) - musician
- Edward Story (died 1503) - bishop
- Charles Sutton (1891–1962) - cricketer

== T ==
- Frederick Tees - member of the Dam Busters raid during Operation Chastise
- James Tighe - professional wrestler

== V ==
- Herbert Vivian (1865–1940) – writer, journalist and newspaper proprietor

== W ==
- Rollo Weeks (born 1987) - actor
- George Weldon (1908–1963) - conductor
- John Weldon (1676–1736) - composer
- Simon of Wells (died 1207) - Bishop of Chichester

== Y ==
- Comfort Yeates (born 2005) – trampoline gymnast
- Yi Hani (born 2011) - singer, dancer and member of girl group Tuide
