= Michael Wilding =

English actor (1912–1979)

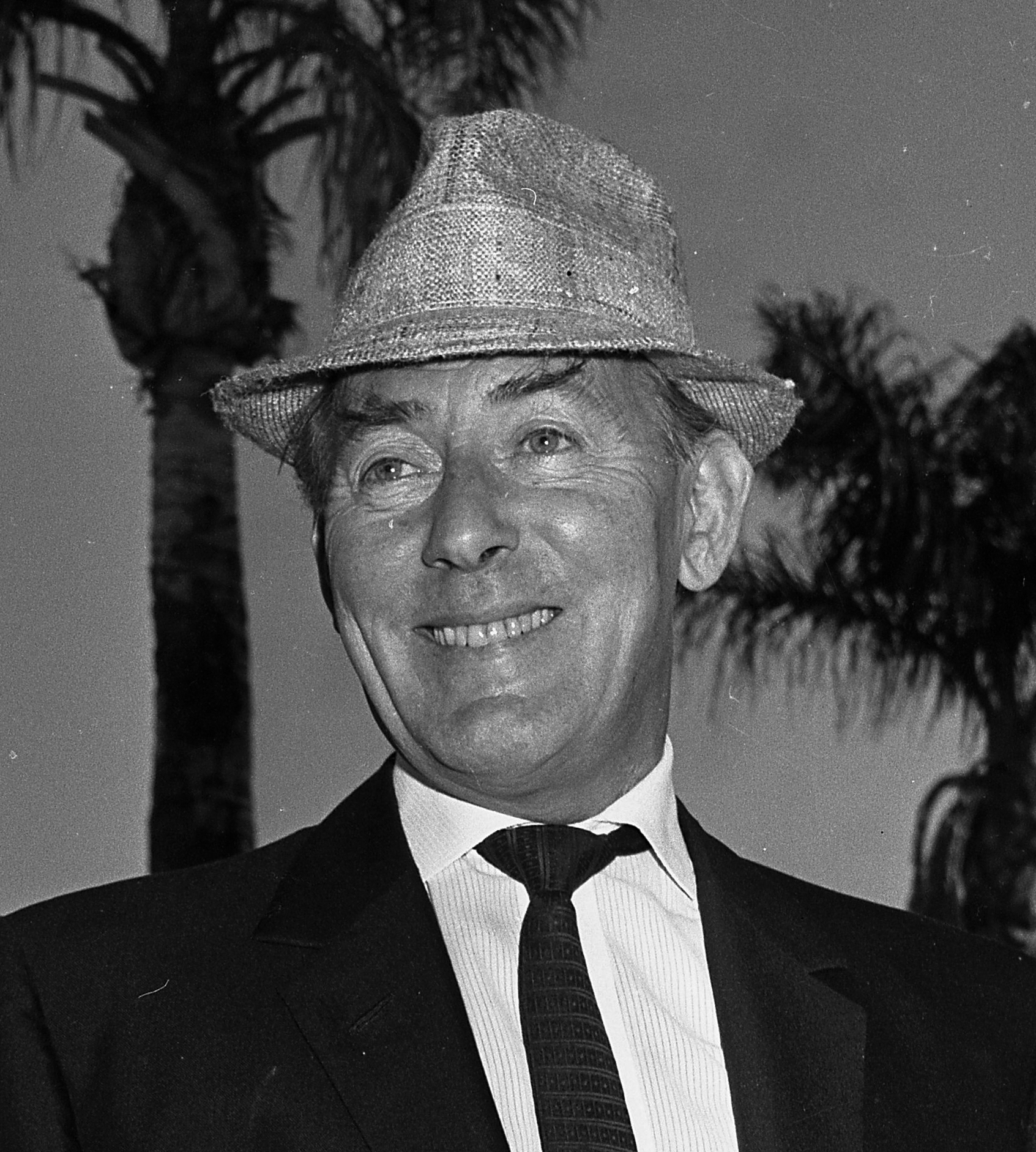
- Wilding in 1964
- Born: Michael Charles Gauntlet Wilding; 23 July 1912; Leigh-on-Sea, Essex, England
- Died: 8 July 1979 (aged 66); Chichester, West Sussex, England
- Years active: 1933–1979
- Spouses: Kay Young (m. 1937; div. 1951) Elizabeth Taylor (m. 1952; div. 1957) Susan Nell (m. 1958; div. 1962) Margaret Leighton (m. 1964; died 1976)
- Children: 2

Michael Charles Gauntlet Wilding (23 July 1912 – 8 July 1979) was an English stage, television, and film actor. He is best known for a series of films he made with Anna Neagle; he also made two films with Alfred Hitchcock, Under Capricorn (1949) and Stage Fright (1950); and he guest starred on Hitchcock's TV show in 1963. He was married four times, including to Elizabeth Taylor, with whom he had two sons.

== Biography ==
Born in Leigh-on-Sea, Essex, England, and educated at Christ's Hospital, Wilding left home at age 17 and trained as a commercial artist. He went to Europe when he was 20 and supported himself in Europe by doing sketches. He wanted to get into designing sets for films and approached a London film studio in 1933 looking for work. They invited him to come to work as an extra.

== Acting career ==
Wilding appeared as an extra in British films such as Bitter Sweet (1933), Heads We Go (1933), and Channel Crossing (1933). He caught the acting bug and decided to make it a career. He reportedly appeared in an Austrian film called Pastorale.

He made his stage debut in The Ringer in 1934 for the Watford Repertory Company and made his London stage debut in Chase the Ace the following year. He could be spotted in the films Late Extra (1935), When Knights Were Bold (1936), and Wedding Group (1936). He was in two musicals on stage, Spread It Abroad and Home and Beauty.

In 1937–38 he toured Australia and New Zealand with Fay Compton's stage company. The plays included Personal Appearance, Victoria Regina, Tonight at Eight Thirty and George and Margaret. While in Australia he filmed a prologue for Personal Appearance.

Back in England he appeared in the first Gate Revue, then followed this with another revue, Let's Face It and a pantomime, Who's Taking Liberty.

He had bigger film parts in There Ain't No Justice (1939), Convoy (1940), and Tilly of Bloomsbury (1940). He had a good role in Sailors Three (1940), and Sailors Don't Care (1940).

Wilding had a leading role in Spring Meeting (1941) but was back to support parts in The Farmer's Wife (1941). His films grew more prestigious: Kipps (1941), Cottage to Let (1941), Ships with Wings (1941), The Big Blockade (1941), In Which We Serve (1942), Secret Mission (1942), and Undercover (1943). He played in Quiet Weekend on stage for a year. In 1943 he performed for the troops in Gibraltar with John Gielgud.

=== Stardom ===
Wilding finally became a film name with Dear Octopus (1943). He followed it with English Without Tears (1944).

==== Collaboration with Anna Neagle ====
What really made him a star was appearing opposite Anna Neagle in Piccadilly Incident (1946). Director Herbert Wilcox had wanted Rex Harrison or John Mills and had only taken Wilding reluctantly. However, once he saw the rushes he signed Wilding to a long-term contract. Piccadilly Incident was the second most popular film at the British box office in 1946. After co-starring with Sally Gray in Carnival (1946), Wilding was reunited with Neagle and Wilcox in The Courtneys of Curzon Street (1947), the biggest hit at the 1947 British box office and one of the most-seen British films of all time. Alexander Korda cast him opposite Paulette Goddard in An Ideal Husband (1947), another hit, but it failed to recoup its enormous cost. Wilding, Neagle and Wilcox reteamed for Spring in Park Lane (1948), another outstanding hit. It led to a sequel, Maytime in Mayfair (1949), which was also enormously popular.

Wilding was now one of the biggest stars in Britain—indeed he was voted as such by the readers of Kine Weekly. Director Alfred Hitchcock then cast him in two consecutive films that he produced through his own film production company Transatlantic Pictures (distributed through Warner Brothers Pictures). The first, Under Capricorn (released in 1949), in which he played opposite Ingrid Bergman and Joseph Cotten, was shot mostly in London but had final retakes and overdubs filmed in Hollywood. It was one of Hitchcock's few flops. His second film for Hitchcock was the more popular Stage Fright (released in 1950), also filmed in London, with Marlene Dietrich and Jane Wyman. Thirteen years later, in 1963, Wilding starred in an Alfred Hitchcock Hour episode titled "Last Seen Wearing Blue Jeans".

Wilcox used him in a film without Neagle, Into the Blue (1950) and the public response was considerably less enthusiastic than for the films they made together. He put Anouk Aimée under personal contract and announced plans to make a movie together but none resulted.

=== Hollywood ===
MGM made an offer for Wilding to appear opposite Greer Garson in The Law and the Lady (1951); the film was not a success. He returned to Britain for The Lady with a Lamp (1951), a biopic of Florence Nightingale with Neagle and Wilcox. It was popular in Britain, though less so than their earlier collaborations.

So too was Derby Day (1952), the last Neagle–Wilding collaboration. Wilcox tried Wilding with a new star, Margaret Lockwood, in Trent's Last Case (1952), a minor hit. In 1952 British exhibitors voted him the fourth most popular star at the local box office.

In May 1952, Wilding signed a long-term contract with MGM. He turned down a role in MGM's Latin Lovers, and the studio put him under suspension.

In Hollywood, Wilding supported Joan Crawford in MGM's Torch Song (1953). 20th Century Fox borrowed him to play a pharaoh in its big-budget spectacular, The Egyptian (1954), which was a box-office disappointment.

At MGM, he was Prince Charming to Leslie Caron's Cinderella in The Glass Slipper (1955), and Major John André in The Scarlet Coat (1956).

=== Supporting actor ===
Wilding journeyed with Taylor to Africa to appear in Zarak (1956) for Warwick Films, after which his marriage to Taylor ended. He began appearing regularly on U.S. television, including the title role in the 1957 episode "The Trial of Colonel Blood" of NBC's anthology series The Joseph Cotten Show.

He had some roles in Danger Within (1959), a POW movie; The World of Suzie Wong (1960); The Naked Edge (1961); The Best of Enemies (1961); and A Girl Named Tamiko (1962).

=== Final films ===
His last roles included The Sweet Ride (1968) and Waterloo (1970).

His last appearance in a feature was in a cameo in Lady Caroline Lamb (1972), which co-starred his last wife, Margaret Leighton. His last role was in the TV movie Frankenstein: The True Story (1973).

=== Box-office ranking ===
At the peak of his career, British exhibitors voted him among the most popular stars in the country:

- 1947—seventh most popular British star
- 1948—fifth most popular star
- 1949—second most popular star
- 1950—sixth most popular British star
- 1951—tenth most popular star
- 1952 – fourth most popular British star

== Personal life ==
Wilding was married four times: to Kay Young (married August 1937, separated December 1945, divorced December 1951); Elizabeth Taylor (married February 1952, separated July 1956, divorced January 1957); Susan Nell (married February 1958, divorced July 1962); and Margaret Leighton (married from July 1964 until her death in January 1976).

He and Taylor, who was 20 years his junior, had two sons, Michael Howard (born 6 January 1953) and Christopher Edward (born 27 February 1955). In 1957, he had a short-lived romance with actress Marie McDonald, who was nicknamed The Body.

In the 1960s, he was forced to cut back on his film appearances because of illness related to his lifelong epilepsy.

== Death ==
Wilding died on 8 July 1979 in Chichester, West Sussex, as a result of head injuries from a fall down a flight of stairs during an epileptic seizure. His remains were cremated and the ashes were scattered.

== Filmography ==
Year	Title	Role	Notes
1933	Bitter Sweet	Extra	Uncredited
1933	Heads We Go	Minor Role	Uncredited
1933	Channel Crossing	Passenger Boarding Ferry	Uncredited
1935	Late Extra	Newspaper Telephone Operator	Uncredited
1936	When Knights Were Bold	Soldier	Uncredited
1936	Wedding Group	Dr. Hutherford	
1939	There Ain't No Justice	Len Charteris	
1940	Convoy	Dot	
1940	Tilly of Bloomsbury	Percy Welwyn	
1940	Sailors Three	Johnny Wilding	
1940	Sailors Don't Care	Dick	
1941	Mr. Proudfoot Shows a Light	Officer #2	
1941	Spring Meeting	Tony Fox-Collier	
1941	The Farmer's Wife	Richard Coaker	
1941	Kipps	Ronnie Walshingham	
1941	Cottage to Let	Alan Trently	
1942	Ships with Wings	Lieutenant David Grant	
1942	The Big Blockade	Captain	Uncredited
1942	In Which We Serve	Flags	
1942	Secret Mission	Private Nobby Clark	
1943	Undercover	Constantine	
1943	Dear Octopus	Nicholas Randolph	
1944	English Without Tears	Tom Gilbey	
1946	Piccadilly Incident	Capt. (later Major) Alan Pearson	
1946	Carnival	Maurice Avery	
1947	The Courtneys of Curzon Street	Sir Edward Courtney	
1947	An Ideal Husband	Viscount Arthur Goring	
1948	Spring in Park Lane	Richard	
1949	Maytime in Mayfair	Michael Gore-Brown	
1949	Under Capricorn	Honorable Charles Adare	
1950	Stage Fright	Detective Inspector Wilfred 'Ordinary' Smith	
1950	Into the Blue	Nicholas Foster	
1951	The Law and the Lady	Nigel Duxbury / Lord Henry Minden aka Hoskins	
1951	The Lady with a Lamp	Sidney Herbert / Lord Herbert of Lea	
1952	Derby Day	David Scott	
1952	Trent's Last Case	Philip Trent	
1953	Torch Song	Tye Graham	
1954	The Egyptian	Akhnaton	
1955	The Glass Slipper	Prince Charles	
1955	The Scarlet Coat	Major John Andre	
1956	Zarak	Major Michael Ingram	
1959	Danger Within	Major Charles Marquand	
1960	The World of Suzie Wong	Ben Marlowe	
1961	The Naked Edge	Morris Brooke	
1961	The Best of Enemies	Burke	
1962	A Girl Named Tamiko	Nigel Costairs	
1968	Code Name: Red Roses	English General	
1968	The Sweet Ride	Mr. Cartwright	
1970	Waterloo	Sir William Ponsonby	
1972	Lady Caroline Lamb	Lord Holland	

== Television ==
Year	Title	Role	Other notes
1956	Screen Directors Playhouse	David Scott	Episode: The Carroll Formula
1955–1956	The 20th Century Fox Hour	Robert Marryot; Captain Robert Wilton	Episode: Cavalcade; Episode: Stranger in the Night
1957	The Joseph Cotten Show	Colonel Blood	Episode: The Trial of Colonel Blood
1958	Climax!	Lieutenant MacKenzie Barton	Episode: The Volcano Seat (1); Episode: The Volcano Seat (2)
1958	Target		Episode: The Clean Kill
1959	Lux Playhouse	Stephen MacIllroy	Episode: The Case of the Two Sisters
1958–1959	Playhouse 90	Sir John Alexander; Chris Hughes	Episode: Verdict of Three; Episode: Dark as the Night
1962	Saints and Sinners	Sir Robert	Episode: A Night of Horns and Bells
1963	The Alfred Hitchcock Hour	David Saunders	Episode: Last Seen Wearing Blue Jeans
1963	Burke's Law	Dr. Alex Steiner	Episode: Who Killed Sweet Betsy?
1966	The Girl from U.N.C.L.E.	Franz Joseph	Episode: The Lethal Eagle Affair
1966	Bob Hope Presents the Chrysler Theatre	Major Tucker	Episode: The Fatal Mistake
1968	Mannix	Phillip Montford/Sir Arnold Salt	Episode: A View of Nowhere
1973	Frankenstein: The True Story	Sir Richard Fanshawe	TV film, (final film role)

== See also ==
- List of British actors
- List of people educated at Christ's Hospital
- List of people from Chichester
- List of people with epilepsy

Husband of Elizabeth Taylor
Preceded by Conrad Hilton Jr.	Husband of Elizabeth Taylor (by order of marriage); 1952–1957	Succeeded by Mike Todd
