= The Football Factory =

The Football Factory is the title of the following works:

- The Football Factory (film)
- The Football Factory (novel)
