= Peter Mason (journalist) =

English writer (born 1963)

- Born: 24 July 1963 (age 63)
- Occupations: Journalist; author
- Writing career
- Notable works: The Brown Dog Affair (1997); Bacchanal: The Carnival Culture of Trinidad (1998); Learie Constantine (2008); Clyde Walcott: Statesman of West Indies Cricket (2024)

Peter Mason (born 24 July 1963) is an English journalist and author.

His books include biographies of two great West Indies cricketers-turned-statesmen, Learie Constantine and Clyde Walcott, Bacchanal! (a study of Trinidad Carnival) and The Brown Dog Affair, about the "brown dog riots" of Edwardian London, which was made into a BBC Radio 4 play titled The Strange Affair of the Brown Dog.

Among Mason's other works are Jamaica in Focus (2000), a study of the culture, politics and economics of Jamaica, and a 1993 history of Southend United football club.

== Career ==
As a journalist, Mason's longest running association has been with The Guardian, where he has been a staffer on the foreign and sports desks and for which he is a regular obituarist. He is also an arts critic for the Morning Star newspaper.

In the late 1980s, Mason was among a small coterie of British journalists focusing on writing about green issues. In the early 1990s, he was news editor of Green magazine, the UK’s first publication for green consumers, and in 1999, with its former editor Alistair Townley, he co-founded Ethical Performance, an international publication on corporate social responsibility. He was its editor and managing editor for 12 years.

With Football Factory author John King, Mason was also co-founder of Two Sevens small press magazine, which included one of the first ever interviews with Irvine Welsh.

Mason has written extensively on the Caribbean as well as on reggae and calypso. For a number of years he was a contributor to the weekly Black Echoes music newspaper (now known as Echoes).

In 2024, Mason abridged, edited and wrote an introduction to Charles Darwin's The Voyage of the Beagle (1839), excising most of the scientific content to recreate the book purely as a piece of travel literature.

== Bibliography ==
- Southend United: The Official History of the Blues (Yore Publications, 1993)
- Caribbean Cookery for Vegans (Two Sevens Publishing, 1996)
- The Brown Dog Affair (Two Sevens Publishing/London Books, 1997)
- More Caribbean Cookery for Vegans (Two Sevens Publishing, 1998)
- Bacchanal: The Carnival Culture of Trinidad (Latin America Bureau, 1998)
- Jamaica in Focus (Latin America Bureau, 2000)
- Learie Constantine (Macmillan/Signal Books, 2008)
- Clyde Walcott: Statesman of West Indies Cricket (Manchester University Press, 2024)

== Introductions ==
- Phineas Kahn: Portrait of An Immigrant (London Books, 2018)
- Charles Darwin's Great Adventure: Voyage of the Beagle Without the Science (Two Sevens Publishing, 2024)

== Book chapters ==
- The Show Must Go On: A Century of Club Cricket in the South of England – chapter on the rise and fall of Caribbean cricket clubs in the south of England from the late-1940s onwards (Trinorth, 2015)
