= The Prison House =

2004 novel by John King

- First edition
- Author: John King
- Language: English
- Published: 2004
- Publisher: Jonathan Cape, Vintage
- Publication place: England
- Media type: Print
- Preceded by: White Trash
- Followed by: Skinheads

The Prison House is the sixth novel by John King. It was first published in 2004 by Jonathan Cape and subsequently in paperback by Vintage. The Cape edition carries the following endorsement by Brian Keenan, author of An Evil Cradling, based on Keenan's four years as a hostage in Beirut during the 1980s: "With a brutally brilliant imagination, The Prison House takes you to a place where angels fear to tread. Go there and be redeemed."

== Synopsis ==
The story's main character is a young man called Jimmy who, after a period of time travelling and drifting around Europe, finds himself incarcerated in Seven Towers, a notorious prison in an unnamed country on the continent's edge. Although he has always been an outsider, he is now a fully-fledged alien who doesn't understand the language or the customs of the other inmates. The prison is squalid, violent, and frightening; his only way of escaping this living nightmare is via his imagination.

As Jimmy delves into the depths of his mind, his thoughts take on a sometimes-hallucinogenic quality. The characters he meets inside Seven Towers push his sanity to the brink: the silent, pyjama-clad Papa with his deadly knitting needle; the cheerful killer and mutilator known as the Butcher; and Dumb Dumb, a deaf-mute who is trying to build a better world out of matchsticks. But Jimmy is determined to survive, and the novel is ultimately a testament to the strength of the human spirit.

Jimmy's crime is not revealed until the end of the book. Various dark possibilities are dangled in front of the reader until the crucial event that has destabilised his existence is laid bare. The seven towers of the jail are matched to the seven deadly sins, and King has said the story "deals with the choice between retribution and rehabilitation – notions of birth and innocence."

== Reception ==
Writing in The Independent column "A Week in Books", Boyd Tonkin argued that The Prison House confirmed King as "an adventurous avant-garde novelist" and that "the sheer virtuosity of his language overflows with a richness of invention that propels the reader through even the most gruelling ordeals." He continued: "In this literary jail, the ghost of Kafka shares a cell with the shade of Burroughs. An epigraph quotes Jack London on the infant 'born with fear'. Behind this passage lies Wordsworth's 'Intimations of Immortality' ode, where 'Shades of the prison-house begin to close/ Upon the growing boy'."

In his review, The Guardian's Josh Lacey said: "King writes with a straightforward, aggressive intelligence that is perfectly suited to his subject matter, and his frenzied descriptions are exhilarating. He is also an unusually serious novelist – serious both about the form itself, and the reasons for reading and writing." The Big Issue called The Prison House "a compelling, impressive read" and King "perhaps the most passionately liberal writer in Britain today."
