= Skinhead (disambiguation) =

A skinhead is a member of a subculture that originated among working-class youth in London, England.

Skinhead may also refer to:

- White power skinhead
- "Skinhead" (Doctors), a 2005 television episode
- Skinheads (film), 1989
- Skinheads (novel), 2008
