= Randolph family =

Randolph family may refer to:

- Randolph family of Virginia
- An alternative title for the 1943 British film Dear Octopus
