= The Gilt Kid =

1936 novel by James Curtis

- First edition
- Author: James Curtis
- Language: English
- Publisher: Jonathan Cape
- Publication date: 1936
- Publication place: United Kingdom
- Pages: 240
- ISBN: 0-9551851-2-2
- Followed by: There Ain't No Justice

The Gilt Kid is the debut novel by British author James Curtis published in 1936. It is a crime thriller set in 1930s London but also deals with working-class themes in a Social realism style.

== Plot ==
The protagonist of the novel is Kennedy, a 25-year-old spiv. Due to his blond hair he is known as "The Gilt Kid" from which the novel gets its title. The novel picks up as Kennedy has recently been released from prison having served a sentence for burglary. With no real plans to go straight and with Marxist sympathies he re-engages with the underworld of Soho and its associated culture. On his travels through London he observes and comments on the rituals of the destitute, prostitutes and criminals. Eventually "The Gilt Kid" finds himself involved in a robbery that doesn't go to plan. Fearing the inevitability that he will return to prison he struggles with the judicial system and attempts to ensure his freedom.

== Cultural impact ==
The novel is notable for its use of colloquial language and cockney picked up by the author's first hand experience. It was referenced as a source in Eric Partridge's A Dictionary of Slang and Unconventional English (1937).

== Publication history ==
The novel was originally published in London by Jonathan Cape in 1936 and reissued in 1947 as no.623 in the Penguin main series. In 2007 London Books republished it having spent years out of print. The reissue features an introduction by Paul Willetts, biographer of author Julian MacLaren-Ross, and an interview with Curtis' daughter, Nicolette Edwards.
