= Sergei Nolbandov =

Russian film director (1895–1971)

Sergei Nolbandov (Russian: Сергей Нолбандов; 1895–1971) was a Russian-born screenwriter, film producer and director.

Nolbandov was born in Moscow in 1895. He later moved to Britain where he worked in the British film industry. He died in Lewes, Sussex in 1971. He produced Memory of the Camps, documenting the conditions Allied troops found when they liberated Nazi concentration camps.

== Filmography ==
Director

- Ships with Wings (1941)
- Undercover (1943)

Producer

- The Bells (1931)
- Convoy (1940)
- Value for Money (1955)
- She Didn't Say No! (1958)

Production Supervisor

- German Concentration Camps Factual Survey (1945)

Screenwriter

- The Amateur Gentleman (1936)
- Fire Over England (1937)
- There Ain't No Justice (1939)
- The Four Just Men (1939)
- Ships with Wings (1941)
