= James Curtis (British writer) =

British writer (1907–1977)

- Born: Geoffrey Basil Maiden; 4 July 1907; Sturry, Kent
- Died: 1977; Camden, London
- Resting place: St Pancras, London
- Occupations: Novelist, Screenwriter
- Writing career
- Notable works: The Gilt Kid, There Ain't No Justice, They Drive By Night

James Curtis (4 July 1907 – 1977) was a British writer who was best known for his novels, They Drive By Night and There Ain't No Justice, both of which were made into feature films.

== Life ==
James Curtis was born Geoffrey Basil Maiden, in Sturry, Kent on 4 July 1907. He was privately educated in Kent and after leaving school he moved to London. In 1934, Curtis appeared in two films, Manhattan Melodrama and Fugitive Lady, in uncredited roles.

He later adopted the pseudonym of James Curtis and began a career as an author. In total he wrote six novels as well as, at least, one work of political observations.

Curtis was forced to stop writing when World War II broke out. He would go on to tour France and Burma and rose to the rank of Major. After the war, his marriage had failed and his literary momentum never recovered.

== Works ==
Curtis used his plots to highlight society's unfairness and the lack of opportunity that often led people to break the law in times of poverty. The lexicographer Eric Partridge frequently cited Curtis as a source of new slang words in his A Dictionary of Slang and Unconventional English.

His debut novel The Gilt Kid was published in London by Jonathan Cape in 1936 and reissued in 1947 as no.623 in the Penguin main series.

In 1937 he published two novels, You’re in the Racket Too and There Ain't No Justice. You’re in the Racket Too is notable for being one of the earliest examples in print of the expression ”Gordon Bennett!” 1937 also saw the publication of his only non-fiction work, A Guide to British Liberties, featuring left-wing political observations.

In 1938 he published his fourth novel, They Drive By Night followed in 1939 by his penultimate novel, What Immortal Hand.

After a 17-year absence he published his final published work in 1956, the novel Look Long Upon a Monkey.

In 2007, London Books republished his 1936 novel, The Gilt Kid to coincide with the 30th anniversary of his death. It featured an interview with his daughter, Nicolette Edwards. In 2008 a reissue of They Drive By Night followed as part of their London Classics series. In 2014 There Ain't No Justice was published by London Books as their tenth London Classic. The contemporary introduction was written by Martin Knight.

== Adaptations ==
In 1938, They Drive By Night was released as a feature film with the screenplay provided by Curtis himself. It was directed by Arthur Woods and starred Emlyn Williams and Ernest Thesiger.

The following year his second novel was made into a film of the same name, There Ain't No Justice (1939). The author again provided the screenplay with Pen Tennyson acting as director.

== Death ==
In 1977, James Curtis died in Camden, North London after suffering a heart attack in a chemist shop. He is buried in St Pancras cemetery.

== Bibliography ==
=== Novels ===
- The Gilt Kid (1936)
- You’re in the Racket Too (1937)
- There Ain't No Justice (1937)
- They Drive By Night (1938)
- What Immortal Hand (1939)
- Look Long Upon a Monkey (1956)

=== Screenplays ===
- They Drive by Night (1938)
- There Ain't No Justice (1939)
- Ten Days in Paris (1940)
