= John Clements (actor) =

British actor (1910–1988)

Sir John Clements CBE
- John Clements in 1954
- Born: John Selby Clements; 25 April 1910; London, England
- Died: 6 April 1988 (aged 77); Brighton, Sussex, England
- Education: St John's College, Cambridge
- Years active: 1935–1982
- Spouses: Inga Maria Lillemor Ahlgren (married 1936–1946); Kay Hammond (married 1946–1980)

Sir John Selby Clements (25 April 1910 – 6 April 1988) was a British actor and producer who worked in theatre, television and film.

== Biography ==
=== Theatre career ===
Clements made his first professional appearance on the stage in 1930, then worked with Nigel Playfair and afterwards spent a few years in Ben Greet's Shakespearean Company.

In 1935 Clements founded the Intimate Theatre, a combined repertory and try-out venue, at Palmers Green. He appeared in almost 200 plays and also presented a number of plays in the West End as actor-manager-producer.

Clements married the actress Kay Hammond and together they had a critical success with their West End revival of Noël Coward's play Private Lives in 1945. In 1952 they both appeared in Clements's own play The Happy Marriage, an adaptation of Jean Bernard-Luc's Le Complexe de Philemon. Clements starred as Edward Moulton Barrett in the musical Robert and Elizabeth, a successful adaptation of The Barretts of Wimpole Street.

In December 1951 Clements directed Man and Superman in the West End, and played the role of John Tanner alongside Allan Cuthbertson.

Clements was the artistic director of the Chichester Festival Theatre from 1966 to 1973.

The actor John Standing is his stepson.

=== Film career ===
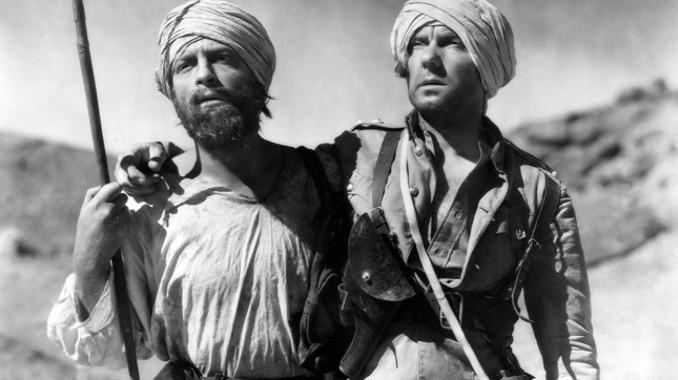
John Clements and Ralph Richardson in The Four Feathers (1939)

As a film actor John Clements played bit parts of increasing size for Alexander Korda's London Films in the 1930s. He made quite an impression opposite Robert Donat and Marlene Dietrich in Knight Without Armour as Poushkoff, a sensitive, conflicted young commissar who saves their lives during the Russian Revolution. He came to further prominence when film director Victor Saville chose him to star opposite Ralph Richardson in South Riding (1938). The two actors were reunited in the very successful The Four Feathers (1939).

After that Clements's film career was somewhat intermittent, although he made a series of British war films for Ealing Studios and British Aviation Pictures, such as Convoy (1940), Ships with Wings (1942), Tomorrow We Live (1943) and as Yugoslav guerrilla leader Milosh Petrovitch in Undercover (1943). He had a cameo role (as Advocate General) in Gandhi (1982).

=== Honours and death ===
Clements was made a Commander of the Order of the British Empire (CBE) in 1956 and was knighted in 1968. He died in Brighton, East Sussex, in 1988.

== Filmography ==
- The Divine Spark (1935) as Florino
- Once in a New Moon (1935) as Edward Teale
- Ticket of Leave (1936) as Lucky Fisher
- Things to Come (1936) as The Airman (uncredited)
- Rembrandt (1936) as Govaert Flinck
- Knight Without Armour (1937) as Poushkoff
- I, Claudius (1937) as Valente
- South Riding (1938) as Joe Astell
- Housemaster (1938) as Undetermined Minor Role (uncredited)
- Star of the Circus (1938) as Paul Houston
- The Four Feathers (1939) as Harry Faversham
- Convoy (1940) as Lieutenant Cranford
- This England (1941) as John Rookeby
- Ships with Wings (1941) as Lieutenant Dick Stacey
- Tomorrow We Live (1943) as Jean Baptiste
- Undercover (1943) as Milosh Petrovitch
- They Came to a City (1944) as Joe Dinmore
- Call of the Blood (1949) as Julius Ikon
- Train of Events (1949) as Raymond Hillary (segment "The Composer")
- The Silent Enemy (1958) as The Admiral
- The Mind Benders (1963) as Major Hall
- Oh! What a Lovely War (1969) as General Helmut von Moltke
- Gandhi (1982) as Advocate General
- Top Secret! (1984) as East German Dignitary (uncredited) (final film role)

== Selected theatre credits ==
- The Venetian (1931)
- Edward, My Son (1949)
- And This Was Odd (1951)
- The Happy Marriage (1952)
- The Little Glass Clock (1954)
