= The Liberal Politics of Adolf Hitler =

2016 novel by John King

- Author: John King
- Language: English
- Published: 2016
- Publisher: London Books
- Publication place: England
- Media type: Print
- Preceded by: Skinheads
- Followed by: Slaughterhouse Prayer

The Liberal Politics of Adolf Hitler is the eighth novel by English author John King, published in 2016. Three essays led to its release: The Left Wing Case for Leaving the EU, Flying the Flag (both in New Statesman), and The People Versus the Elite (Penguin). A supporter of British withdrawal from the European Union, King was previously on the advisory council of the People's Pledge group and appeared on BBC Radio 4's Any Questions at the time of the book's launch. Author David Peace has described the novel as "One of the best, if not the best, bravest and most exciting books I've read in years – needed saying, needed writing and needs to be read."

== Synopsis ==
The Liberal Politics of Adolf Hitler is a dystopian novel set approximately fifty years into the future, when a European superstate has been formed and the individual countries of Europe officially dissolved. Power is centralised in the hands of a corporate-driven elite based in Brussels and Berlin. Controllers describe this masked dictatorship as New Democracy. Elections are a thing of the past, and the cultures of the old nation states are recycled in distorted ways. Across Europe, people fight back, with the two main British resistance groups being GB45 and Conflict.

The novel looks at globalization, the nature of democracy, the manipulation of language, and the future uses of technology. Physical books and hard-copy recordings of documentary, news, film, and music have been outlawed, and full-scale digitisation of the same means history and culture can be edited, rewritten, or deleted as seen fit by those in power. The title of the book draws on a single mention of Hitler, whose crimes against humanity have in this way been hidden from new generations. There is also an animal-rights thread to the story that, in an interview with 3am Magazine (which described the book as "a timely and provocative satire"), the author linked to his next novel, Slaughterhouse Prayer.

== Reception ==
The book's reception has tended to split along political and cultural lines. Reviewing it shortly after it was released, The Morning Star said: "King steadily constructs, layer by layer, an increasingly believable world where a combination of intrusive technology, ruthlessness and effectively bland public relations has ensured the domination of the majority's thoughts and actions." Trade Unionists Against The EU called it "Brave, imaginative fiction. An important political novel that is supremely relevant to our turbulent times."

Focusing on the story's cultural and stylistic elements, Marc Glendening of The Democracy Movement saw the novel as "One of the most bizarre and wonderful things I have read. It has the dreamlike quality of a David Lynch movie. A cross between Brave New World, A Clockwork Orange and Nineteen Eighty-Four." The underground punk magazine Streets Sounds wrote: "Blade Runner meets The Clash. Punk fiction at its very best."

In 2018, King collaborated with the industrial musician and producer Meg Lee Chin for a Word Drop video titled "The United States of Europe – Power Fully Centralised", based on the book.
