= Epsom riot =

1919 riot in Epsom, Surrey, England

Coordinates: 51.3321°N 0.2672°W

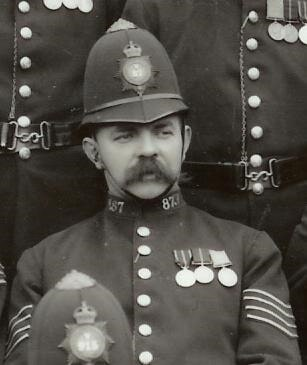
Station Sergeant Thomas Green, killed in the Epsom riot, June 1919

The Epsom riot took place on 17 June 1919 when between 300 and 800 Canadian soldiers rioted and attacked the police station in Epsom, Surrey, England. Station Sergeant Thomas Green, a British police officer, was injured during the incident and died the following day.

The Canadians were from the nearby Woodcote Park Convalescent Hospital, a former temporary military base that had been converted for use as a convalescent hospital. With the First World War over, discipline at the camp was relaxed. Delays in repatriating Canadian soldiers had resulted in thirteen riots by troops in British camps between November 1918 and June 1919. The riot began when two Canadian servicemen were arrested following a disturbance at a local public house. Their comrades marched on the town police station to demand their release. The soldiers ripped up the railings surrounding the station to use as projectiles and clubs. In the ensuing fighting, Private Allan McMaster, a former blacksmith, picked up a metal bar and struck Green on the head. The sergeant died the following day, having never regained consciousness.

Seven men appeared at the Surrey Assizes in July 1919. They were found guilty of rioting, but were acquitted of manslaughter. They were sentenced to one year in prison, but were released after only a few months. Ten years after returning to Canada, McMaster, one of those imprisoned, confessed to the killing. As he had already been found not guilty of manslaughter, he was not returned to the UK.

== Background ==
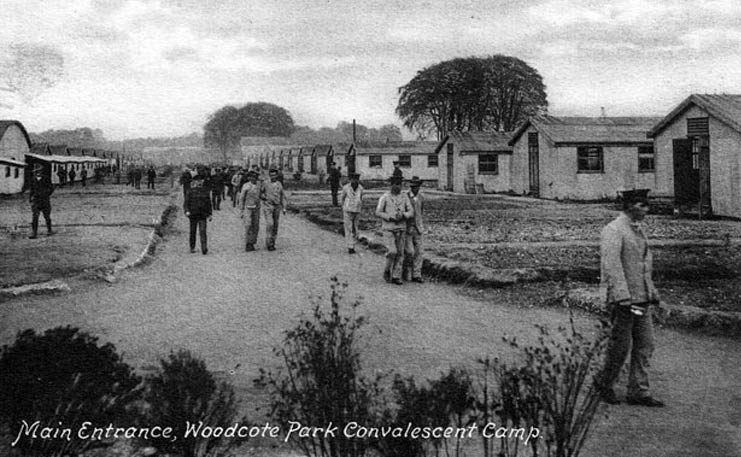
The main entrance of Woodcote Park Convalescent Hospital in 1915. Those in lighter-coloured uniforms are patients at the camp's hospital.

Woodcote Park Convalescent Hospital was a temporary military base at Woodcote Park, on the outskirts of Epsom, Surrey. Part of the park, which was owned by the Royal Automobile Club (RAC), was commandeered by the War Office in 1914. In 1915 the camp was converted to a convalescent hospital, initially for troops from the Commonwealth, then, from August 1916, specifically those from Canada. In the early months of 1919 the numbers at the camp varied between 2,000 and 4,000 patients and staff; by mid-June there were between 2,079 and 2,200 occupants.

Following the end of the First World War in November 1918, there were more than 250,000 Canadian troops in Britain and on the Western Front. Troops stationed in mainland Europe were transported to the UK before being repatriated to Canada. They were held at a series of military camps across Britain, including Bramshott, Hampshire; Witley, near Guildford, and Woodcote at Epsom, both in Surrey; Ripon, North Yorkshire; Buxton in Derbyshire; Seaford in East Sussex; and Kinmel, near Rhyl, North Wales. On average a Canadian soldier returning from continental Europe stayed in Britain for about a month before leaving for Canada.

The slow progress of repatriation was a cause of anger among the waiting servicemen. The winter of 1918–19 was one of the hardest for several years and there was an influenza pandemic. Delays in transporting the troops were exacerbated by the need to cancel at least one ship because it was deemed unsatisfactory. The situation led to riots at Kinmel in March 1919 (Note: Eight hundred men rioted at Kinmel, a repatriation camp holding 20,000 Canadians. Five rioters were killed and twenty-three injured. Thirteen prisoners were shipped to the Tower of London and twelve were sent to Walton Gaol the same day; fifty-nine men were court martialled.) and at Witley Camp that June. (Note: There were no deaths at the Witley Camp riot, but there was extensive damage to local property and the camp's theatre and civilian shops were a target for arson.) Between November 1918 and June 1919 Canadian troops rioted in British camps thirteen times, including Epsom. (Note: Canadian troops were not alone in rioting at the post-war months. There was rioting by British troops in Le Havre in December 1919, a mutiny in Southampton among British troops in January 1919, and a second rebellion in Calais later the same month. In May the same year, 2,000 American soldiers and sailors were joined by Australians and Canadians in a fight against 50 police.)

There was increasing tension between the inhabitants of the camp and the residents of Epsom, particularly in the post-war months. Minor accounts of law-breaking—including theft and public order offences—were prominently published in the local press, harming the relationship between the inhabitants of town and camp. Many British veterans returning to Epsom and its environs were annoyed by relationships between local women and the camp's residents. Members of the East Surrey Regiment "begrudged what they perceived to be the disproportionate praise heaped on the Canadian Corps for its capture of Vimy Ridge in 1917", according to the military historian Nikolas Gardner. In early and mid-1919 tensions between the inhabitants of the town and the camp's inmates, including what Gardner describes as "a growing Canadian disregard for the authority of the local police", often manifested itself in violence towards the police if they arrested one of the Canadian soldiers.

Woodcote operated under a relaxed and permissive disciplinary regime. Supervision for the men was by both officers and non-commissioned officers who were sometimes temporary, often from different units, and sometimes employed in medical or administrative roles. Their control over the men, who were passing through the camps to return to their units or be repatriated, was limited. In early 1919 there were only four military police (MP) stationed in the camp, some of whom were patients themselves. The MPs only patrolled the camp, and did not monitor the actions of the Canadians in the town, a duty left to the local Epsom police.

Epsom had a small police station in 1919, capable of fielding fewer than 20 officers for duty at any one time. The force struggled to maintain the peace when locals and Canadian troops met, particularly when the local pubs were open. In the four months leading up to June 1919, tensions rose between townsfolk and the Canadian troops, and violence between the two groups was a regular, almost nightly occurrence; both sides were guilty of being instigators on these occasions. In 1919 Station Sergeant Thomas Green was fifty-one years old. He had previously served for eight years with the Royal Horse Artillery, including in India. In 1895 he signed to join the police before leaving the army—a common practice for many. By 1919 he had been a policeman for nearly 25 years, serving first in London, then for 8 years in Epsom. He was a married man and had two daughters, aged 18 and 19.

== 17–18 June 1919 ==
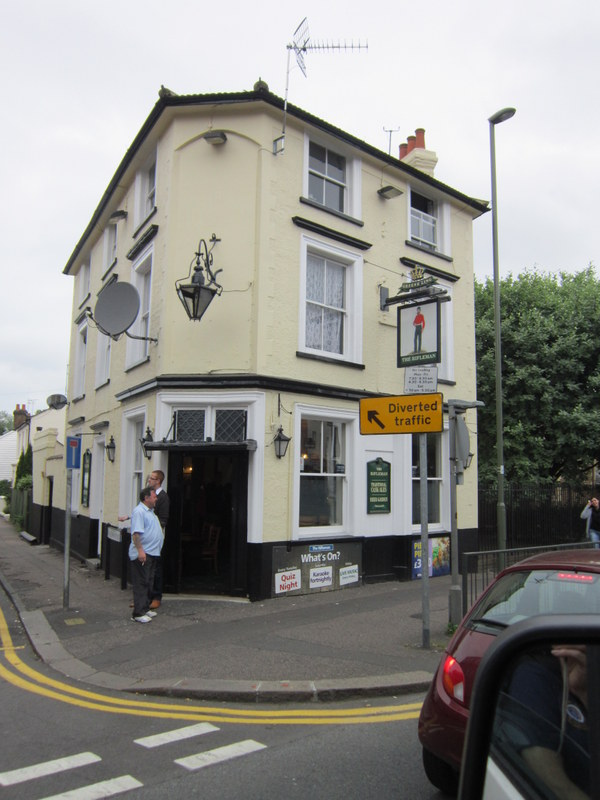
The Rifleman public house, Epsom, 2012

Map of Epsom showing The Rifleman pub (1), Epsom Police Station (2), Woodcote Park (3) and Epsom Cemetery (4).

At around 9:00 pm on the evening of 17 June 1919, a fight broke out at The Rifleman public house in Epsom. The cause of the fight is unclear, but there are three possible versions: a Canadian private and his wife were assaulted by local men; or a Canadian sergeant was with the couple and a fight broke out between the two Canadians; or the private, his wife and a sergeant were assaulted by local men. The landlord of the pub alerted four policemen who were on patrol; they arrested Private John McDonald, one of the Canadians, who, still riled, challenged them to a fight. As they walked him to the police station they were challenged by Driver Alexander Veinot (or Veinotte), who berated the police; he was also arrested. (Note: Some sources, including the historian Desmond Morton, say two soldiers, not just Veinot, were arrested at this point.)

A group of 20 soldiers assembled outside Epsom police station; they were dispersed peaceably by the police. Word of the Canadians' arrest spread fast among the soldiers and at around 10:30 pm a group of 70 Canadians gathered at the station. Half an hour later the senior police officer, Inspector Charles Pawley, sent instructions to his off-duty officers to report to the station to provide support. Sensing trouble, he kept his evening shift on duty to ensure as many men as possible were present in the station. The police phoned Woodcote to arrange the transfer of the prisoners and were warned there was already trouble at the camp. The trouble was from the soldiers returning from the town, and rousing their campmates to return to the station to demand the release of their comrades. Between 300 and 800 soldiers made their way to the police station, despite attempts by the senior Canadian officer—Major James Ross—and Regimental Sergeant Major (RSM) John Parson to stop them.

Ross and Parson went to the police station with the crowd in an attempt to avert the possibility of violence. The two managed to get the men to pause in front of the station, while Ross requested that McDonald and Veinot be transferred to Canadian custody. Ross entered the police station with Pawley and, when he did not reappear promptly, the men thought he had also been arrested and surged forward to attack the building. They flattened the iron railings around the building and used the metal posts as projectiles and clubs. Ross tried to go to the front of the building to stop the attack, but was forced back inside by the projectiles.

With the soldiers unable to break through the barred windows of the police station, some in the crowd suggested burning it down—despite their two comrades and one of their officers being inside—while the police repelled the attempts to come through the station's unbarred windows. Some troops managed to gain access through the side of the station, where they were able to reach the cells. They used a crowbar to open one of the cell doors and free Private McDonald. The soldiers at the front of the building were unaware of the success of their comrades and continued their assault on the station. Flagstones and a log were used on the front door, which buckled but just held. Concerned about the threats to set fire to the building, Green suggested charging the men to clear them from the front; Pawley agreed. Eight policemen took part in the charge out of the building, the remainder stayed to defend the building. They exited the side door of the station and managed to push the crowd away from the station.

In the fracas Green was hit on the head by a fencepost wielded by a teenager, Private James Connors, and was knocked to the ground. He managed to get up again, although he was disoriented. Four police sergeants and eight constables were injured in the rioting, as was Pawley, who received a blow to the head from a post. Many of the soldiers were also injured, including some of the leaders of the attack. As the police retreated to the station, Green, dazed by the blow to his head, stepped the wrong way, towards the Canadians. As he did so, Private Allan McMaster, a former blacksmith, stepped forward and smashed an iron bar onto the policeman's head. Green collapsed to the floor with a fractured skull.

The charge at the front of the station enabled the remaining police to gain access to the cells without coming under projectile fire through the window. They freed Veinot and allowed him to leave the station to cheers from the soldiers. Ross capitalised on the lull in fighting and release of the prisoner, and ordered the bugler who was present to sound the fall in, and they returned to camp. Some of the Canadians saw Green lying on the ground and realised he was in trouble; six of the soldiers picked him up and carried him across the road to the house opposite. One of the men gave him first aid for about thirty minutes before they left. The homeowner noted that it was 12:30 am. A local doctor, William Thornely, was summoned to examine Green, and he diagnosed a fractured skull. Green never regained consciousness and died at 7:20 am on 18 June.

== Aftermath 18 June – December 1919 ==
Colonel Frederick Guest of the Royal Canadian Army Medical Corps (CAMC), the officer commanding Woodcote Park Convalescent Hospital, informed the soldiers of Green's death on the morning of 18 June. He did not put Epsom out of bounds to the troops, but instead requested that they refrain from visiting the town. He felt unable to give the order to ban visits as he thought he did not have sufficient control over the men for the order to be obeyed. He warned his men that the police would need to investigate the matter and that they would want to interview those who took part. When the police contacted Guest, he asked them to delay the interviews until 400 men could be sent down from Ripon Army Camp in North Yorkshire, as he was concerned that police intervention in the camp could cause further trouble. Later in the day Canadian military headquarters placed the town off-limits to all personnel.

Although an armed force was soon present at the hospital, the Canadians were unwilling to help the police enquiries. Ross and Parson could identify few participants, stating afterwards that it had been too dark and there had been too much confusion; the bugler was one of those identified. With no other forms of identification, detectives questioned all men who had head injuries from the night; those who could prove their injuries were from unrelated causes, or that they were not present, were released uncharged. Those who could not account for their head wounds were arrested. On 20 June eight Canadian soldiers were charged with rioting and manslaughter at Bow Street Magistrates' Court: Private James Connors, 19, 13th Canadian Highlanders; Private Robert Alexander McAllan, 45, CAMC; Private Allan McMaster, 30, 3rd Canadians; Private Alphonse Masse, 27, CAMC; Private Gervase Porier, 24 CAMC; Gunner Herbert Tait, 29, 11th Canadian Division; Private Frank Harold Wilkie, 21, 102nd Battalion Canadians and Private David Yerex, 32, Canadian Forestry Corps. A coroner's inquest opened on 19 June; it concluded on 30 July with the verdict that Green was a victim of manslaughter. The inquest determined that Connors, McAllan, McMaster, Masse, Wilkie and Yerex should face trial, as should Robert Todd, the bugler.

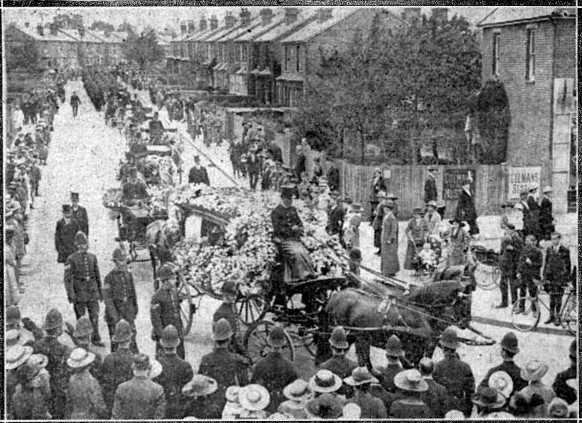
Sergeant Green's funeral, June 1919

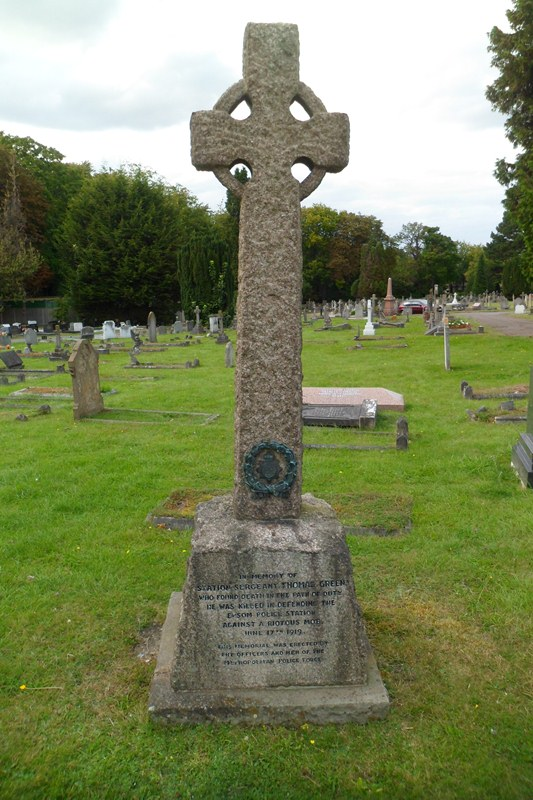
Green's grave in Epsom Cemetery

Green's funeral took place on 23 June 1919. Visitors to the town travelled by train to pay their respects and between 700 and 800 Metropolitan Police officers were in Epsom, dressed in tunics, black gloves and capes. Many of the town's shops shut when the funeral procession started, and the staff joined the crowds lining the route, which were three or four people deep. The procession ended at the Epsom Methodist Church, opposite the police station. After a remembrance service, the procession proceeded to the cemetery for the interment.

On 26 June 1919 the body of an American serving in the Canadian Army, Private Frederick Bruns, was found in a chalk pit, near Woodcote camp. His skull was fractured. An inquest was held 48 hours later, and closed the same day with an open verdict. He was buried the same day. Martin Knight, who published a history of the riot and its aftermath in 2010, writes he "is prone to lean towards some sort of foul play taking place. Whether it was directly related to the riot and/or Sergeant Green's death is a harder decision to make". Bruns's body was buried near the Roll of Honour at Epsom Cemetery, near Green's grave.

The seven men identified at the inquest appeared at the Surrey Assizes on 22 July, charged with manslaughter and riotous assembly; (Note: The seven were Connors, McAllan, McMaster, Masse, Todd, Wilkie and Yerex.) Mr Justice Darling presided. The trial ended the following day. The judge advised the jury against a manslaughter verdict and the men were all found not guilty of that charge. McAllan and Todd were acquitted of rioting, but the others were found guilty and sentenced to a year in prison.

In November 1919 four of the men were released early from prison; the fifth was released in December that year. The Observer reported that the release "was based both on the merits of the cases, and the fact that Canada by the visit of the Prince of Wales had demonstrated its unswerving loyalty to the British Empire". It is possible that the men received pardons from Edward, the Prince of Wales: McMaster referred to this later, but there is no official record of either a pardon or the involvement of the prince.

== Subsequent events ==
Woodcote continued to house soldiers until at least February 1920; the site was returned to the RAC in 1923. A plaque was installed by Epsom and Ewell Council, near the spot where Green was killed.

In July 1929 McMaster presented himself at Police Headquarters in Winnipeg, Manitoba, and confessed to Green's killing. He told police:

Two of our men got arrested and locked up. As soon as we heard about it we all went down town to take them out of the lockup. We made a rush at the building. Sergt. Green tried to stop me. So I picked up an iron bar and hit him over the head with it. He died the following day.

The Canadian police sent a telegram to Scotland Yard informing them of the confession and asking if they wanted McMaster sent back to Britain. They received the reply "McMaster sentenced in connection with this affair and he is not wanted"; he was released. In about 1928 he was working in a mine, where he saved a man's life; he died in 1939 aged fifty.

== Notes and references ==
=== Sources ===
==== Books ====
- Gardner, Nikolas (2007). "Disaffection and Disobedience in the Aftermath of the First World War: The Canadian Assault on the Epsom Police Station, 17 June 1919". In Mantle, Craig (ed.). The Apathetic and the Defiant: Case Studies of Canadian Mutiny and Disobedience, 1812 to 1919. Kingston, Ont: Canadian Defence Academy Press. pp. 439–462. ISBN 978-1-55002-710-5.
- Knight, Martin (2010). We Are Not Manslaughterers: The Epsom Riot and the Murder of Station Sergeant Thomas Green. Newcastle upon Tyne: Tontobooks. ISBN 978-1-9071-8314-0.
- Macphail, Andrew (1925). Official History of the Canadian Forces in the Great War,1914-1919: The Medical Services. Ottawa: F. A. Acland, Printer to the King. OCLC 1150945414.
- Morton, Desmond (1993). When Your Number's Up: The Canadian Soldier in the First World War. Toronto: Random House. ISBN 978-0-394-22288-2.
- Nicholson, G. W. L. (1962). The Official History of the Canadian Army in the First World War: Canadian Expeditionary Force, 1914–1919. Ottawa: Roger Duhamel. OCLC 317027864.
- Spindler, Lorraine (2016). Leatherhead in the Great War. Barnsley, South Yorkshire: Pen & Sword Books. ISBN 978-1-4738-4393-6.
- Webb, Simon (2016). 1919: Britain's Year of Revolution. Barnsley, South Yorkshire: Pen & Sword Books. ISBN 978-1-4738-6288-3.

==== Journals and magazines ====
- Gregory, Adrian (2003). "Peculiarities of the English? War, Violence and Politics: 1900–1939". Journal of Modern European History. 1 (1): 44–59. doi:10.17104/1611-8944_2003_1_44. JSTOR 26265778. S2CID 147034590.
- Morton, Desmond (September 1980). "'Kicking and Complaining' Demobilization Riots in the Canadian Expeditionary Force, 1918–19". Canadian Historical Review. 61 (3): 334–360. doi:10.3138/CHR-061-03-03. S2CID 162361340.

==== News ====
- Boswell, Randy (4 September 2010). "A Deadly Riot, a King's Intervention and a Confession". The Vancouver Sun. p. B10.
- "Epsom Camp Outbreak". The Times. 23 July 1919. p. 10.
- "The Epsom Riot". The Epsom Advertiser. 4 July 1919. p. 1.
- "Epsom Riot Charges". The Times. 21 June 1919. p. 9.
- "Epsom Riot Inquest". The Times. 20 June 1919. p. 9.
- "Epsom Riot Inquest". The Times. 1 July 1919. p. 4.
- "Epsom Riot Sequel". The Observer. 30 November 1919. p. 14.
- "Epsom Riots Trial". The Times. 24 July 1919. p. 7.
- "Service held to mark death of police officer". Midhurst and Petworth Observer. 25 June 2009. p. 4.

==== Websites ====
- "History of Woodcote Park". The Royal Automobile Club.
- Williamson, Clifford (July 2019). "1919: Britain's Red Summer". HistoryExtra.
