= Headhunters (novel) =

1998 novel by John King

- First edition
- The Football Factory; England Away
- Author: John King
- Country: England
- Language: English
- Publisher: Jonathan Cape; Vintage
- Published: 1997
- Media type: Print, e-book
- Preceded by: The Football Factory
- Followed by: England Away

Headhunters is the second novel by English author John King. Along with The Football Factory and England Away, it comprises The Football Factory Trilogy, a series that challenges the official position on subjects such as class, racism, sexism, and patriotism in the UK. First published in 1997 by Jonathan Cape and subsequently by Vintage, it has been widely translated abroad. The US edition (2016) includes an introduction by King—"In England's Fair City"—and the following quote by author Michael Moorcock: "John King is the authentic voice of contemporary London".

The main characters in Headhunters are Carter, Mango, Will, Balti, and Harry, who one drunken New Year's Eve decide to create a Sex Division based on the Total Football employed by the great Holland national football team led by Johan Cruyff. The Premiership might be driven by a lust for money, but the Sex Division is a league for purists. Points are awarded for different sexual acts and the season begins. Carter (named after punk band Carter the Unstoppable Sex Machine) sets the early pace. The approach of the individuals involved in the Sex Division is what drives the book, as their deeper feelings and inner lives are revealed. Certain characters reappear in England Away.

In its review of the novel, The Big Issue wrote: "Brutal, honest and poetic in the way that only a tough guy can be, King loads the gun and shoots us into the lager-filled, lust-fuelled lives of five London lads… Headhunters is sexy, dirty, violent, sad and funny; in fact it has just about everything you could want from a book on contemporary working-class life in London." Covering Headhunters for GQ Magazine, author John Williams wrote: "The realism and political edge echoes Alan Bleasdale's Boys from the Blackstuff."
