= Ships with Wings =

- Directed by: Sergei Nolbandov
- Written by: Patrick Kirwan; Austin Melford; Diana Morgan; Sergei Nolbandov
- Produced by: Michael Balcon
- Starring: John Clements; Leslie Banks; Jane Baxter
- Cinematography: Wilkie Cooper; Eric Cross; Mutz Greenbaum; Roy Kellino
- Edited by: Robert Hamer
- Music by: Geoffrey Wright
- Production company: Ealing Studios
- Distributed by: ABFD; United Artists
- Release date: November 1941
- Running time: 103 minutes
- Country: United Kingdom
- Language: English

Ships with Wings is a 1941 British war film directed by Sergei Nolbandov and starring John Clements, Leslie Banks and Jane Baxter. The film is set during the Battle of Greece (1940-1941). It depicts military aviation.

== Plot ==
During the Second World War, pilot Lieutenant Dick Stacey is expelled from the British Fleet Air Arm for imprudence, but later has the opportunity to redeem himself when he takes part in the fight against the Germans in Greece.

== Cast ==
- John Clements - Lieutenant Dick Stacey
- Leslie Banks - Vice Admiral David Wetherby
- Jane Baxter - Celia Wetherby
- Ann Todd - Kay Gordon
- Basil Sydney - Captain Bill Fairfax
- Edward Chapman - 'Papa' Papadopoulos
- Hugh Williams - Wagner
- Frank Pettingell - Fields
- Michael Wilding - Lieutenant David Grant
- Michael Rennie - Lt Maxwell
- Cecil Parker - German Air Marshal
- John Stuart - Commander Hood
- Morland Graham - CPO Marsden
- Charles Victor - MacDermott
- Hugh Burden - Sub Lieutenant Mickey Wetherby
- Frank Cellier - General Baradino Scarappa
- Betty Marsden - Jean
- John Laurie - Lieutenant-Commander Reid
- George Merritt - Surgeon Commander
- Charles Stuart - Von Rittau
- Ian Fleming as Colonel

== Production ==
The film was made by Ealing Studios, but filmed at Fountain Studios in Wembley Park, north-west London.

== Release ==
The film premiered in November 1941 and went on general release in January 1942. It was a commercial success and was the second most popular film in British cinemas that month behind It Started with Eve. The sinking of the Ark Royal, on which a number of scenes were set and shot, in November 1941 added a sense of topicality to the film. Ark Royal portrays the fictional HMS Invincible - a name not used for a Royal Navy aircraft carrier until the 1970s. The most recent ship named HMS Invincible until then was a battlecruiser sunk at the Battle of Jutland in 1916.

== Critical reception ==
The film received an overwhelmingly positive reception from the popular press on its release. However, it came under attack from a number of intellectuals for what they considered its lack of realism while the Prime Minister Winston Churchill objected because of the large number of British casualties shown in the film which he considered bad for morale. The producer Michael Balcon was disturbed by these criticisms and commenced a shift in Ealing's production away from such films towards what were considered more realistic portrayals in an attempt to counter this perceived lack of authenticity. However, except for Dead of Night, Ealing's films for the remainder of the war failed to enjoy the same commercial success as the earlier "unrealistic" war films and were eclipsed at the box office by the Gainsborough melodramas.

== Box office ==
According to Kinematograph Weekly the film was one of the most popular at the British box office in January 1942.

== Bibliography ==
- Aldgate, Anthony & Richards, Jeffrey. Britain Can Take It: British Cinema in the Second World War. I.B. Tauris, 2007.
