= The Happy Marriage =

1952 play

- Original language: English
- Written by: John Clements
- Genre: Comedy
- Setting: London, present day

Premiere
- Date: 8 July 1952
- Place: Grand Theatre, Leeds

The Happy Marriage is a 1952 comedy play written by the British actor John Clements. Inspired by Jean Bernard-Luc's French play Le Complexe de Philémon, it premiered at the Grand Theatre in Leeds. It then transferred to the Duke of York's Theatre in London's West End where it ran for 367 performances from 7 August 1952 to 27 June 1953. The West End cast included Clements, Kay Hammond, Charles Lloyd-Pack, Michael Shepley and Frances Rowe.

== Bibliography ==
- Hartnoll, Phyllis. The Oxford Companion to the Theatre. Oxford University Press, 1983.
- Wearing, J.P. The London Stage 1950–1959: A Calendar of Productions, Performers, and Personnel. Rowman & Littlefield, 2014.
