= Martin Knight (author) =

British writer (born 1957)

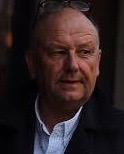
- Knight in 2024
- Born: 21 December 1957 (age 68); Epsom, Surrey, England
- Occupations: Novelist, biographer
- Writing career
- Notable works: Battersea Girl; The Real Mackay; Gypsy Joe; Scoring at Half-time; I Ran with the Gang
- Website: london-books.co.uk/Authors/martinknight.htm

Martin Knight (born 21 December 1957) is an English author.

== Career ==
In 1999 Hoolifan and The Naughty Nineties were released; both books dealing with the culture of football hooliganism. Knight was co-author with Martin King whose memoirs form the core of the books. Irvine Welsh provided the introduction to the latter book. As partners, Knight and King produced "On the Cobbles" the story of Jimmy Stockin a gypsy prize fighter, "Ossie – King of The Bridge" – the autobiography of Chelsea footballer Peter Osgood and "Grass" covering the exploits of major drug smuggler and Howard Marks' cohort Phil Sparrowhawk. In 2010 a copy of "Ossie – King of the Bridge" (among other items) was buried beneath the new statue of Peter Osgood unveiled at Stamford Bridge.

In 2000 Knight produced his first novel "Common People". In 2003 he collaborated with George Best on his final memoirs before his death, "Scoring at Half Time". In 2004 "The Real Mackay" was released – the autobiography of Spurs, Derby and Scotland footballer Dave Mackay. 2006 saw the launch of "Battersea Girl" a partly fictionalised account of Knight's grandmother and a biography of Chelsea, Dundee and Aberdeen footballer Charlie Cooke.

In partnership with author John King, London Books was launched in 2006. King and Knight edited the company's first title "The Special Ones", a collection of memories and opinions of Chelsea fans and from 2007 books by vintage authors Gerald Kersh, James Curtis, Robert Westerby, Simon Blumenfeld, John Sommerfield and Alan Sillitoe were republished. In 2009 "Gypsy Joe: Bareknuckle Fighter and Professional Golfer" was selected by The Observer as their Sports Book of the Year.

In 2010, We Are Not Manslaughterers dealing with the events surrounding the Epsom Riot of 1919 was released.

Knight wrote the introduction to London Books 2014 release of There Ain't No Justice by James Curtis, first published in 1938 and filmed in 1939. The following year Knight contributed to "More Raw Material – Work Inspired by Alan Sillitoe". Knight and John King became friends with Sillitoe and met up regularly in the last ten years of his life at The Lamb and Flag pub near Covent Garden. They were sometimes joined by other Sillitoe admirers such as Sean Bean and the meetings became known as The Flag Club.

"Justice for Joan – The Arundel Murder" was published in 2016. Knight investigates the circumstances surrounding the murder of Joan Woodhouse in Arundel in 1948. The case remains officially unsolved. In 2017, he wrote the afterword to the London Books' reissue of the footballer Alan Hudson's autobiography The Working Man's Ballet.

Knight also had a long business career starting as a library assistant at the Financial Times and then working for Bank ABC in Bahrain before founding Presswatch Media now part of TNS and co-founding Precise Media which was sold to 3i in 2005.

In 2018, I Ran With The Gang: My Life In and Out of The Bay City Rollers was released, written with founding member Alan Longmuir. Longmuir died as the book was being completed.

In 2021 "Cushty: A Romany Life" was published. Cushty was an updated version of "Gypsy Joe" written with Joe Smith. "Broken Wafers", Knight's autobiographical account of his 1960s and 70s childhood was released in 2022 and in 2023 "Justice Killer" was published, this being Knight's debut crime novel.

== Bibliography ==
- Martin Knight (2023). Justice Killer. ISBN 978-1739698324.
- Martin Knight (2022). Broken Wafers. ISBN 978-0995721777.
- Joe Smith and Martin Knight (2021). Cushty. ISBN 978-0995721753.
- Alan Longmuir and Martin Knight. I Ran With The Gang: My Life In and Out of The Bay City Rollers (2018) ISBN 978-1912147755
- Martin Knight (2016). Justice for Joan - The Arundel Murder. ISBN 978-0956815576.
- Neil Fullwood; David Sillitoe; Martin Knight contribution (2015). More Raw Material - Work Inspired by Alan Sillitoe. ISBN 978-0993424106.
- James Curtis, Martin Knight introduction (2014). There Ain't No Justice. ISBN 978-0956815538.
- Martin Knight (2010). Barry Desmond is a Wanker. ISBN 978-0955185199.
- Martin Knight (2010). We Are Not Manslaughterers. ISBN 978-1-907183-14-0.
- Joe Smith/Martin Knight (2009). Gypsy Joe. ISBN 978-0-9551851-7-5.
- Martin Knight/John King (2007). The Special Ones. ISBN 978-0-9551851-0-6.
- Martin Knight (2006). Battersea Girl. ISBN 1-84596-150-1.
- Charlie Cooke and Martin Knight (2006). The Bonnie Prince : Charlie Cooke : My Football Life. ISBN 1-84596-181-1.
- Dave Mackay and Martin Knight (2004). The Real Mackay : The Dave Mackay Story. ISBN 1-84018-840-5.
- George Best and Martin Knight (2003). Scoring at Half-Time : Adventures on and Off The Pitch. ISBN 0-09-189034-9.
- Peter Osgood, Martin King and Martin Knight (2003). Ossie : King of Stamford Bridge. ISBN 1-84018-764-6.
- Phil Sparrowhawk, Martin King; Martin Knight (2003). Grass. ISBN 1-84018-706-9.
- Jimmy Stockin, Martin King; Martin Knight (2000). On the Cobbles : The Life of a Bare-knuckle Gypsy Warrior. ISBN 1-84018-384-5.
- Martin Knight (2000). Common People. ISBN 1-84018-332-2.
- Martin King; Martin Knight (1999). Hoolifan : Thirty Years of Hurt. ISBN 1-84018-174-5.
- Martin King; Martin Knight (1999). The Naughty Nineties : Football's Coming Home?. ISBN 1-84018-191-5.
