= They Drive by Night (novel) =

1938 novel by James Curtis

They Drive By Night
- Ace Books 1959 edition
- Author: James Curtis
- Language: English
- Publication date: 1938
- Publication place: United Kingdom
- Pages: 256
- ISBN: 978-0-9551851-4-4
- Preceded by: There Ain't No Justice
- Followed by: What Immortal Hand

They Drive By Night is the second novel by British author James Curtis published in 1938. It is a crime thriller set in 1930s London and the North of England dealing with working-class themes in a Social realism style.

== Plot ==
The protagonist of the novel is Shorty Mathews, a petty criminal just released from Pentonville Prison. Now free he goes to visit his girlfriend in Camden only to discover her dead having been strangled. Realising he will be the prime suspect he flees the scene and attempts to evade the law by travelling with lorry drivers across the UK. The title, They Drive By Night, is a reference to the long distance logistical community who work, predominantly, at night. The antagonist Hoover is the real killer. He goes by the alter-ego of Lone-Wolf as he trawls the West End of London for more destitute female victims. His motivation to kill is part social cleansing, part mental degeneration.

Alongside both accounts is the police investigation into the murders. Their enquiries proceed, with varying degrees of success, punctuated by corruption and brutality. Needing to wrap up the case there is little choice but to set a trap. Whoever is caught will face the hangman.

== Cultural impact ==
The novel is notable for its use of colloquial language and cockney picked up by the author's first hand experience. It was referenced as a source in Eric Partridge's A Dictionary of Slang and Unconventional English (1937).

== Publication history ==
The novel was originally published in 1938, the same year as its film adaptation.

In 2008 London Books republished it as part of their London Classics imprint. The reissue features an introduction by Jonathan Meades, author and cultural commentator.

== Film adaptations ==
The novel was filmed in 1938 by Arthur Woods, They Drive By Night, with James Curtis himself supplying the screenplay. Due to the themes of sex and prostitution certain aspects of the book were toned down for the screen version but the core murder remains unchanged. On release it was both commercially and critically successful and is still considered a classic British film noir.
