= Bella Caledonia =

Scottish online magazine

- Editor: Mike Small
- Categories: Politics, culture
- Founded: 2007; 19 years ago
- Country: Scotland
- Language: English
- Website: www.bellacaledonia.org.uk

Bella Caledonia is a Scottish online magazine founded in 2007 by Mike Small and Kevin Williamson. It publishes political, social and cultural commentary, with a particular focus on Scottish self-determination, independence and public affairs.

The publication gained prominence during the Scottish independence referendum, when it was among the online outlets supporting the Yes campaign. The site is not affiliated to any political party. Until late 2017, it also published a 24-page print magazine which appeared as a supplement in The National on the first Saturday of every month.

== History ==
=== Founding and development ===
Bella Caledonia was launched in October 2007 by writers Mike Small and Kevin Williamson at the Radical Book Fair in Edinburgh. The site was established as a platform for political and cultural commentary and for discussion of Scottish self-determination. It takes its name from a character in Alasdair Gray's novel Poor Things, and Gray later supplied a new version of his artwork for the site.

During the campaign for the 2014 Scottish independence referendum, the site published commentary supportive of independence and was cited in coverage of the Yes Scotland campaign.

Readership grew during the campaign. The site reported around 40,000 daily readers by 2014, and in the months before the referendum it attracted more than 500,000 unique users a month, peaking at one million in August 2014. In September 2014, the site organised a "Songs for Scotland" event at Òran Mór in Glasgow, alongside a downloadable album of music.

=== Restructuring and later developments ===
By the mid-2010s, Bella Caledonia had moved away from a purely citizen journalism model, comparable to that of De Correspondent, towards accepting more contributions from freelance writers and taking part in collaborations with other outlets. In October 2015, the site began publishing articles in Scottish Gaelic and Scots.

In January 2017, the site announced that it faced closure because of its running costs and launched a fundraising appeal. Days later, its advisory board decided to continue publishing under a restructured model, ceasing to operate as a company and becoming a media collective.

In March 2017, Bella Caledonia began producing a 24-page monthly supplement for The National, published in the edition of the first Saturday of each month.

== Contributors ==
Other contributors to Bella Caledonia have included:

- Neal Ascherson, contributed articles on Scotland, British politics and constitutional change.
- Alan Bissett
- Cat Boyd
- Maggie Chapman
- Stuart Christie
- Stuart Cosgrove
- Meaghan Delahunt
- Carla Easton
- Alec Finlay
- Matthew Fitt
- Jay Griffiths
- Gerry Hassan
- Afua Hirsch, published an essay titled "On Identity" in 2018.
- Kathleen Jamie
- Pat Kane
- George Kerevan
- A. L. Kennedy, published several pieces, including "A Toxic Culture" in 2016.
- Hannah Lavery
- Robin McAlpine
- Smári McCarthy
- Darren McGarvey, published work on Scottish politics, social class and inequality, including writing under his former stage name, Loki.
- Alastair McIntosh
- Alison Phipps
- Lesley Riddoch
- Sara Sheridan
- Irvine Welsh, wrote an article exclusively for Bella Caledonia in 2013 about Scottish independence and British unity.
- Andy Wightman

== Reception ==
=== Accolades ===
In 2011, The List included Bella Caledonia in its ranking of the top 30 Scottish websites. In 2015, Cision included Bella Caledonia in its list of the UK's top 10 political blogs.

=== Criticisms ===
In November 2021, weeks after the murder of MP David Amess, the site was criticised after a post on its Twitter account gave the location of Home Secretary Priti Patel.
