= They Drive by Night (1938 film) =

1938 film by Arthur B. Woods

- British lobby card
- Directed by: Arthur B. Woods
- Written by: Paul Gangelin; Derek Twist
- Screenplay by: James Curtis
- Based on: They Drive by Night; 1938 novel by James Curtis
- Produced by: Jerome Jackson
- Starring: Emlyn Williams; Ernest Thesiger
- Cinematography: Basil Emmott
- Edited by: Leslie Norman
- Music by: Bretton Byrd
- Production company: Warner Bros.-First National Productions
- Distributed by: Warner Bros. (UK)
- Release date: December 1938
- Running time: 84 minutes
- Country: United Kingdom
- Language: English

They Drive by Night (also known as Murder on the Run) is a 1938 British black-and-white crime thriller film directed by Arthur B. Woods and starring Emlyn Williams and Ernest Thesiger. It was written by Paul Gangelin, James Curtis and Derek Twist based on Curtis's 1938 novel They Drive by Night, and produced by Warner Bros.-First National Productions.

The novel was reissued in 2008 by London Books.

== Plot ==
"Shorty" Matthews, having recently been released from prison, visits his girlfriend in London, only to discover that she has been murdered. Fearing he will be wrongly accused of being the culprit, he disappears among the long-distance lorry-driving community. Meanwhile, the real killer, an unassuming ex-schoolteacher named Walter Hoover, continues to prey on London women. As Shorty had feared, he has become the main suspect. He returns to London with an old flame, Molly, hoping to prove his innocence.

== Cast ==
- Emlyn Williams as Shorty Matthews
- Ernest Thesiger as Walter Hoover
- Anna Konstam as Molly O'Neill
- Allan Jeayes as Wally Mason
- Anthony Holles as Murray
- Ronald Shiner as Charlie, the café proprietor
- William Hartnell as bus conductor
- Leonard Sharp as card player at billiard hall
- Iris Vandeleur as flower seller

== Production ==
The female victims of the original book were prostitutes and to prevent censorship this aspect was watered down. Additionally, the book featured scenes of police brutality that were excised altogether. The film was made by Warner Brothers at the recently purchased Teddington Studios as a quota film under the Cinematograph Films Act 1927.

== Release ==
While the film gained a certificate to be released in the United States, the studio was unable to get a negative out of Britain. As a result, the film did not receive a U.S. theatrical release.

== Reception ==
=== Box office ===
The film made a profit of £10,557.

=== Critical ===
The Monthly Film Bulletin wrote: "This gripping and exciting thriller has been admirably produced and directed. Great care has been taken with the backgrounds, which are strikingly realistic. The strange night life on the trunk roads with the open all-night cafés (pronounced "caffs") is contrasted with the gay and flashy palais de danse. The cheap lodging-house is set over against Mr Hoover's luxurious but eerie flat. The sinister opening – a group of people waiting outside a prison for the bell which tolls for the execution of a murderer – is repeated in the closing sequence, after a climax in the Grand Guignol tradition."

The Daily Film Renter wrote: "Gripping story of ex-convict's adventures... Emlyn Williams forceful as persecuted hero, and Ernest Thesiger gives grim study as the murderer. Holding dramatic entertainment guaranteed to thrill."

Kine Weekly wrote: "Emlyn Williams, very good as the unhappy hero, and Ernest Thesiger, outstanding as a homicidal maniac, share the acting honours, and in their performances is an arresting blend of rough-stuff and subtlety. Good support, atmosphere and dialogue do the rest. Mass appeal is terrific. Excellent popular booking."

Picturegoer wrote: "Ernest Thesiger is very good in the macabre role of a sadistic psychologist and Anna Konstam is sympathetic in the role of the dance hostess. The story is well told and Arthur Woods's direction is noteworthy."

In British Sound Films: The Studio Years 1928–1959 David Quinlan rated the film as "outstanding", writing: "Splendid, atmospheric black thriller: the sleeper of its year."

Leslie Halliwell wrote: "Excellent, little seen British suspenser of the Hitchcock school."
