= Rebel Inc. (magazine) =

Scottish publishing company and eponymous literary magazine

Rebel Inc. is a Scots counter-culture publishing company and literary journal, founded by Kevin Williamson in 1992 with the slogan of "F*** the Mainstream!". Duncan Mclean, Gordon Legge, Barry Graham and Sandie Craigie were involved in setting it up. For a time Craigie was its co-editor. It attempted to tap into “the darker undercurrent of Scottish society in the post-Thatcher era”.

Rebel Inc Magazine ran to five issues between 1992 and 1994, publishing new work by writers such as Irvine Welsh, Alan Warner, Laura Hird, Toni Davidson and John King before any of them had books in print. Issue 4 featured an infamous 'Ecstasy Interview' - an unedited conversation between Kevin Williamson and Irvine Welsh whilst both editor and writer were under the influence of the psychoactive drug, MDMA.

In his blog of February 2008, Kevin Williamson wrote "I pulled a stunt on Radio Scotland which satisfied the Malcolm McLaren criteria of "establishing the name", as related to one of the finest exploitation movies of all time: The Great Rock'n'Roll Swindle."

In 1996, following the success of Trainspotting by Irvine Welsh, Rebel Inc. was incorporated into the Canongate Books stable of independent publishers. A steady stream of releases then ensued, with out-of-print editions by the likes of Alexander Trocchi and Sadegh Hedayat, who themselves are considered influential by many contemporary dark Scottish authors such as Welsh and Alan Warner. It brought on a new generation of foreign writers such as Henry Baum, Joel Rose and Ray Loriga, who shared its outlook.

The Rebel Inc. imprint ended as a result of disagreement between Williamson and Canongate over the creative and commercial direction of the imprint, which led to Williamson's resignation and departure from the company in January 2001. The imprint ended abruptly, Canongate would later claim this was due to financial restructuring. Many of Rebel Inc.'s titles and authors were subsequently transferred into the main Canongate itinerary.

In 2012, Williamson announced plans to revive Rebel Inc. on its 20th anniversary.
