= Undercover (1943 film) =

1943 film by Sergei Nolbandov

- 2010 DVD release cover
- Directed by: Sergei Nolbandov
- Screenplay by: John Dighton; Monja Danischewsky; Sergei Nolbandov (uncredited); Milosh Sekulich (uncredited)
- Story by: George Slocombe; Milosh Sekulich (uncredited); Sergei Nolbandov (uncredited)
- Produced by: Michael Balcon; S. C. Balcon
- Starring: John Clements; Mary Morris; Michael Wilding; Stephen Murray; Tom Walls; Stanley Baker; Godfrey Tearle
- Cinematography: Wilkie Cooper
- Edited by: Eileen Bolan
- Music by: Frederic Austin
- Production company: Ealing Studios
- Distributed by: United Artists
- Release dates: 27 July 1943 (UK); 14 September 1944 (US)
- Running time: 80 minutes
- Country: United Kingdom
- Language: English

Undercover is a 1943 British war film produced by Ealing Studios, originally titled Chetnik. It was filmed in Wales and released on 27 July 1943. Its subject is a guerrilla movement in German-occupied Yugoslavia, loosely based on Draza Mihailovich's Chetnik resistance movement.

The film was produced by Michael Balcon and directed by Sergei Nolbandov. It stars John Clements, Mary Morris, and Stephen Murray, with Michael Wilding and 15-year-old Stanley Baker (in his film debut).

The film was released in the United States in 1944 by Columbia Pictures under the title Underground Guerrillas. It is similar to the 20th Century Fox wartime film Chetniks! The Fighting Guerrillas (1943), made in the U.S.

== Background ==
The film is based on the Yugoslav resistance movement under the command of General Draza Mihailovich. But politics overtook the situation because Mihailovich and the Royalists were about to be abandoned by the British government – as parts of the Chetnik movement co-operated with the Nazis – in favour of the Communist and Stalinist leader Josip Broz Tito. Speaking in Parliament on 22 February 1944, the Prime Minister, Winston Churchill, said: "General Mihailovic, I much regret to say, drifted gradually into a position where his commanders made accommodations with Italian and German troops…" The screenplay, by John Dighton and Monja Danischewsky, was accordingly amended, and the film was re-edited. It ended up as a black and white war film, 80 minutes in length.

== Plot ==
Two-page advert for the film in 17 July 1943 issue of Kinematograph Weekly, made by famous illustrator Eric Fraser.

The film focuses on the fictional Petrovitch family in Belgrade, Serbia. One brother, Milosh, a Yugoslav military captain forms an anti-Nazi guerilla movement in the mountains of Serbia. His brother, Dr. Stephan Petrovitch, poses as a Nazi collaborator to obtain information for the guerrillas while working directly under General von Staengel, commander of the German occupation force.

Using information obtained by Stephan, Milosh and his guerrillas are able to ambush a German train and free Yugoslav PoWs, while wounding General Staengel in the process. Stephan operates on the wounded General, saving his life, and gaining the General's trust. Milosh's wife, Anna Petrovitch, a schoolteacher, is taken prisoner and interrogated, but she escapes, with the help of some of her students, and joins Milosh in the mountains. In retaliation, German troops under Colonel von Brock execute six schoolchildren.

Later, Stephan uses his credentials as a Nazi sympathizer to plant explosives on a German train, timing them to go off in a mountain tunnel. The film's climax is a pitched battle between the Germans and guerrillas. Afterwards, the Serbians retreat into the mountains to continue their campaign of terror and resistance against Axis occupation.

1944 Columbia Pictures lobby card for the U.S. release as Underground Guerrillas.

== Cast ==
1944 U.S. release movie poster, Columbia Pictures.

- John Clements as Milosh Petrovitch
- Mary Morris as Anna Petrovitch
- Stephen Murray as Dr. Stephan Petrovitch
- Tom Walls as Kossan Petrovitch
- Rachel Thomas as Maria Petrovitch
- Michael Wilding as Constantine
- Stanley Baker as Petar
- Godfrey Tearle as General von Staengel
- Robert Harris as Colonel von Brock
- Niall MacGinnis as Dr. Jordan
- Ivor Barnard as Stationmaster
- Terwyn Jones as Danilo
- Finlay Currie as Priest
- Ben Williams as Dragutin

== Crew ==
- Director: Sergei Nolbandov
- Producer: Michael Balcon
- Associate Producer: S.C. Balcon
- Script: John Dighton, Monja Danischewsky, Sergei Nolbandov (uncredited), and Milosh Sekulich (uncredited). Based on a story by George Slocombe, Milosh Sekulich (uncredited), and Sergei Nolbandov (uncredited)
- Cinematography: Wilkie Cooper
- Art Direction: Duncan Sutherland
- Editing: Eileen Boland
- Supervising Editor: Sidney Cole
- Special Effects: Roy Kellino
- Technical Advisors: Milosh Sekulich, W.E. Hart
- Music: Frederic Austin

== Sources ==
- Barr, Charles. Ealing Studios: A Movie Book. Berkeley, CA: University of California Press, 1999.
- Barr, Charles. (1974). "Projecting Britain and the British Character: Ealing Studios, Part II." Screen, 15(2), pages 129–163.
- Dick, Bernard F. The Star-Spangled Screen: The American World War II Film. Lexington, KY: University Press of Kentucky, 2006. p. 164.
- Undercover on the citwf database: http://www.citwf.com/film365195.htm
