= Human Punk =

2000 novel by John King

- First edition
- Author: John King
- Language: English
- Published: 2000
- Publisher: Jonathan Cape, Vintage
- Publication place: England
- Media type: Print
- Preceded by: England Away
- Followed by: White Trash

Human Punk is a novel by John King that tells the story of a group of boys who leave school in 1977, and the effect the emerging punk movement has on their lives. The book is largely based in Slough, a new town on the outskirts of London, famed for its industry and large trading estate. Human Punk follows the lives of main character Joe Martin and his friends Smiles, Dave, and Chris across the next three decades.

== Plot ==
Set against a soundtrack of Clash, Sex Pistols, Ruts, and Ramones records, sixteen-year-old Joe sets about enjoying his newfound freedom, which in the summer of 1977 means hard-drinking pubs and working-men's clubs, local Teds, soulboys, disco girls, and a job picking cherries with gypsies. A joyride to Camden Town in North London takes him to see his first band, but a late-night incident back on the streets of Slough changes his life forever.

The second part of the book takes place in 1988 and finds Joe in China, receiving bad news in a letter from home. He buys a black-market ticket and takes the Trans-Siberian Express back to England. During this journey, he reflects on the events that have filled the intervening years, eventually returning to that night in 1977. Siberia passes in a series of recollections and romance with a Russian woman, Joe arriving in Moscow during the days of Mikhail Gorbachev, continuing to Berlin, where he crosses the Wall in the early hours. More trains take him on to Slough.

The third section of Human Punk captures the main characters as they reach middle age. They are older but little wiser. Slough has changed, but not too much, the spirit that drove Joe and his friends as boys stronger than ever. He makes his living in a range of ways, one of which involves buying and selling secondhand records. His punk beliefs remain solid. Life bounces along, until a face from the past emerges from the haze of a misty morning and forces him to stop and confront his memories once more.

== Cultural impact ==
Human Punk covers many aspects of the punk scene, from the original music and bands, to its DIY ethos. It is also a novel that charts some major shifts in British society, from the failing Labour government of 1977 to Thatcherism in the 1980s, and later the New Labour of Tony Blair and a Cool Britannia that means little to those portrayed in the book. Human Punk reflects a version of punk that is anti-fashion, its roots to be found in the broader culture of the main characters.

The novel has been praised for its literary style as well its subject matter. Reviewing the book, the New Statesman said: "In its ambition and exuberance, Human Punk is a league ahead of much contemporary English fiction." The Independent wrote, "The long sentences and paragraphs build up cumulatively, with the sequences describing an end-of-term punch-up and the final canal visit just two virtuoso examples. These passages come close to matching the coiled energy of Hubert Selby's prose... In the resolution of the novel's central, devastating act, there is an almost Shakespearean sense of a brief restoration of balance after the necessary bloodletting."

Human Punk has also been well received in punk circles. JC Carroll of The Members, whose hit single "Sound of the Suburbs" reflects similar landscapes, said of the book: "Human Punk shines as a beacon of suburban working-class literature, a fucked-up Catcher in the Rye, high on speed and punk rock. This is not the punk of the Sunday supplement arts pages, this is English culture, educated not at Oxbridge but on the streets of Slough." Watford Jon, lead singer of Argy Bargy, called Human Punk "The best book I have ever read", while Lars Frederiksen of Rancid wrote the following for the US edition (2015): "John King: the face in our subculture who lives what he writes."
