= Skinheads (novel) =

2008 novel by John King

- First edition
- Author: John King
- Language: English
- Series: The Satellite Cycle
- Release number: 3
- Published: 2008
- Publisher: Jonathan Cape, Vintage
- Publication place: England
- Media type: Print
- Preceded by: White Trash
- Followed by: The Liberal Politics of Adolf Hitler

Skinheads is the seventh novel by British author John King. It was first published in 2008 by Jonathan Cape and subsequently by Vintage. Set in the same new-town and Outer London hinterland as two of King's previous books, Human Punk (2000) and White Trash (2001), it forms a loose trilogy, The Satellite Cycle. The book has been translated and released in a number of countries, among them France, Italy, and Russia.

== Plot ==
Skinheads is based around three generations of the same family—Terry English, his nephew Ray (a.k.a. Nutty Ray), and Terry's fifteen-year-old son, Lol (named after the ska singer Laurel Aitken). While the bulk of the book is set in the present day, it includes recurring sections from periods considered key to skinhead culture—1969 and the early 1980s—with events linking to the overriding story.

Terry is the main character, an original skinhead approaching his fiftieth birthday and mourning the loss of his wife, while attempting to keep the volatile Ray out of trouble and being concerned that his son, Laurel, might be a closet hippy. Terry is also facing a life-or-death problem but finds strength in his long-term friendships, the responsibilities of running a minicab firm, a dream to reopen the boarded-up and recently rediscovered Union Jack Club, and his ongoing love of Jamaican ska and bluebeat.

Ray, meanwhile, is angry and on edge, but doing his best to hold his life together. However, he does not like drug dealers and especially those trying to sell to his children. If Terry reflects the easygoing music of his youth, then Ray mirrors the aggression and street politics of Oi! punk, while facing the same smears levelled at the original movement. Lol is a much more relaxed character who plays less of a role in the main story, but with his musical interests, shows the fusion of ska, punk, and Oi! in bands like Rancid, as well as the political and cultural shifts of the previous decades.

== Reception ==
Journalist and author Garry Bushell, who played a key role in Oi!'s development, has said of the novel: "John King is a master of modern fiction, and this book is a welcome and recognisable reappraisal of Britain's most down-to-earth youth cult. Skinhead culture is many things—dangerous, thrilling, uplifting, patriotic, creative, and often politically incorrect. No wonder it terrified the Establishment. But as King shows, with its roots in Cockney and West Indian culture, skinheads were never just the 'fick fascist fugs' of Middle England's fevered imaginings".

Raquel Moran, in The New Review, wrote that the central theme of Skinheads is that "family values, the love for your own country and the ethics of hard work are timeless sentiments which anyone and everyone, including members of the British skinhead culture, is allowed to praise and defend in their own way". Arena called Skinheads "A nuanced argument for skinhead culture", while The Sunday Telegraph called the author "An energetic and technically adroit writer".
