= England Away =

1998 novel by John King

- First edition
- The Football Factory; Headhunters
- Author: John King
- Country: England
- Language: English
- Publisher: Jonathan Cape; Vintage
- Published: 1998
- Media type: Print, e-book
- Preceded by: Headhunters

England Away is the third novel by John King, first published by Jonathan Cape in 1998 and subsequently by Vintage. The final part of The Football Factory Trilogy, it follows characters from The Football Factory and Headhunters as they come together and head into Europe for an England football match against Germany in Berlin.

Tommy Johnson narrates the trip to Berlin via Amsterdam, while back in London, pensioner Bill Farrell remembers a similar route he took as a soldier during the Second World War, dealing with some horrific memories and a tragic killing in the process. Farrell and Johnson are forced to confront their demons, albeit with very different results. Both these characters represent the core of King's debut, The Football Factory, which was made into a film in 2004. Directed by Nick Love, it featured Danny Dyer as Tommy Johnson, while Dudley Sutton played Bill Farrell.

In an interview with writer Jay Slayton-Joslin, King said of England Away: "We are all the result of those who went before us, and I'm interested in this continuation and the expansion of our culture". The novel draws on the Second World War and its aftermath, while considering the relationship between Britain and the EU, a subject King focuses on in The Liberal Politics of Adolf Hitler (2016).

In his review for the Morning Star, Chris Searle wrote: "The words of Wilfred Owen come pounding through the prose: 'I was the enemy you killed, my friend.' The literature is in the sordid truth and crude, raucous, mob-like poetry of King's lifesaving and lifewasting that bursts from his pages, confronting the reader with questions of culture, nationalism, violence and class that are not easily put aside."
