= Convoy (1940 film) =

1940 British film by Pen Tennyson

- Original UK poster
- Directed by: Pen Tennyson
- Written by: Patrick Kirwan; Pen Tennyson
- Produced by: Michael Balcon
- Starring: Clive Brook; John Clements; Edward Chapman; Judy Campbell
- Cinematography: Roy Kellino; Günther Krampf
- Edited by: Ray Pitt
- Music by: Ernest Irving
- Production company: Ealing Studios
- Distributed by: ABFD (UK); RKO Pictures (US)
- Release dates: 5 July 1940 (UK); 3 January 1941 (US)
- Running time: 90 minutes 78 minutes (US)
- Country: United Kingdom
- Language: English

Convoy is a 1940 British war film directed by Pen Tennyson and starring Clive Brook, John Clements and Edward Chapman. It was written by Patrick Kirwan and Tennyson and produced by Ealing Studios.

Convoy was Tennyson's last film before he was killed in an aircraft crash, while serving in the Royal Navy.

== Plot ==
A Royal Navy cruiser, HMS Apollo, commanded by Captain Tom Armitage returns to base to find all leave has been cancelled and they are to start out straight away for a special mission. Supplemented with a new first officer, Lieutenant Cranford who turns out to have caused the captain's divorce a few years earlier, they are sent to meet a convoy in the North Sea and escort it safely into British coastal waters.

One stubborn freighter captain from the SS Seaflower, who has a cargo hold full of Polish refugees, mainly Jews, lags the main convoy and is stopped by a U-boat. At first they bluff their way past claiming to be a neutral ship. However they are tailed by the U-boat as they try to join the convoy. They telegram the Navy to send a destroyer to help them, emphasising that they have two British women on board. The navy refuses to either acknowledge or to help, saying it will jeopardise the main convoy.

Seaflower is then captured by a U-boat which sets a trap for the convoy escort. One of the passengers is Lucy Armitage, the former wife of the cruiser's captain, as well as the former lover of the first officer. A reconnaissance aircraft sent from the British, finds the freighter and the German fleet, but the pilot and co-pilot are shot and the aircraft falls in the sea.

The Germans make use of this, sending urgent messages from the freighter, claiming it is sinking and naming her as one of the passengers. When the first officer takes the bait and tries to send a destroyer to the freighter's rescue, the captain locks him up, as all ships must protect the convoy. Eventually, a North Sea patrol destroyer comes to the rescue, sinking the U-boat and escorts the freighter to the convoy, where the captain and his ex-wife meet and come to an understanding.

However, the German pocket battleship Deutschland soon appears. Although his cruiser is hopelessly outgunned, the captain decides to attack in order to keep the battleship away from the convoy until British battleships arrive. During the battle, the captain and his wife's former lover reconcile before the latter dies flooding the magazine in order to save the ship. The British battleships arrive at the last minute.

== Cast ==
- Clive Brook as Captain Tom Armitage
- John Clements as 1st Officer, Lt David Cranford
- Edward Chapman as Capt Eckersley
- Judy Campbell as Lucy Armitage
- Penelope Dudley-Ward as Mabel
- Edward Rigby as Mr Matthews
- Charles Williams as Shorty Howard
- Allan Jeayes as Cmdr. Blount
- Michael Wilding as Dot
- Harold Warrender as Lt. Cmdr. Martin
- David Hutcheson as Capt Sandeman
- George Carney as Bates
- Al Millen as Knowles
- Charles Farrell as Walker
- John Laurie as Gates
- George Benson as Parker
- Hay Petrie as Minesweeper skipper
- Mervyn Johns as Minesweeper's mate
- Albert Lieven as U-boat commander
- John Wengraf as Cmdr. Deutschland
- Edward Lexy as Merchantman skipper
- John Glyn-Jones as Merchantman's mate
- Patrick Holt as Holt
- Stewart Granger as Sutton
- Anton Diffring as U-boat officer (uncredited)

== Production ==
Pen Tennyson served in the Royal Navy Volunteer Reserve (RNVR) at the time of the production of Convoy. To gain some experience in convoy conditions, he was given an exemption in order to be assigned to HMS Valorous (L00), then stationed on convoy duty. (Note: Following the completion of Convoy in May 1940, Tennyson took up a long-deferred commission in the Royal Navy, and at the end of June 1941, he was recruited for the Admiralty's instructional films unit. He was killed in an aircraft crash on 7 July 1941.)

=== Soundtrack ===
The music in Convoy is by Ernest Irving and includes a slowed down version of "Rule, Britannia!".

=== Background ===
In many scenes, the actors are clearly standing in front of screens and in one scene the pennant number 41 supposedly on the side of HMS Apollo is seen but the image has been reversed. However the only actual ship in service during the Second World War with pennant number 41 was the V-class destroyer HMS Vega (L41).

Deutschland was the lead ship of the heavy cruisers (termed pocket battleships by the British) which also included Admiral Sheer and Graf Spee. Deutschland was renamed Lutzow in January 1940 after the loss of Graf Spee in the Battle of the River Plate and sunk as a target ship by the Russian navy in 1947.

== Release ==
Convoy premiered at the New Gallery Cinema in London on 5 July 1940, as part of a double bill with The Saint's Double Trouble.

== Reception ==
=== Critical ===
The Monthly Film Bulletin wrote: "This is an epic of the sea, beautifully directed and with no false heroics. The male cast live their parts and, from the hard-boiled sinful old skipper of one of the convoy's tramps through the lower deck of Apollo to Clive Brook as Captain Armitage, they bring into the cinema the authentic atmosphere of ships. Judy Campbell does her best in the slight and somewhat unnecessary part of Armitage's wife. The settings are amazingly – and at times almost terrifyingly – realistic. This film can, in short, justifiably claim to be the most exciting, lifelike and restrained account of the Navy's work in wartime yet seen on the screen."

The Times wrote: "This film up to a point succeeds in giving some idea of the work implied in the title. The pity is that it did not go farther, risk the charge of being labelled documentary", concluding that the film "has some substantial merits to set against its lack of austerer virtues."

In The New York Times Theodore Strauss wrote, "if the film fails in its frankly propagandistic mission it is because of spurious craftsmanship and because it is a little too self-consciously heroic. ... The actors, including Clive Brook and John Clements, are all so teddibly British in the face of grave danger that their calm becomes unconvincing."

=== Box Office ===
Convoy earned at least £50,000 outside England.

According to Kinematograph Weekly it was the most popular British film of 1940 in Britain.
