= Laura Hird =

Scottish novelist and short story writer

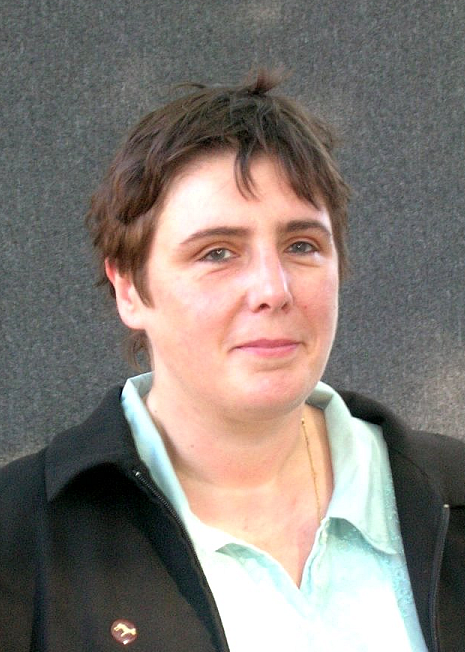

Laura Hird (born 1966) is a Scottish novelist and short story writer.

Hird studied Contemporary Writing at Middlesex Polytechnic and is the author of two novels, Nail and Other Stories (1997) and Born Free (1999). Hope and Other Urban Tales, a novella and short story collection, followed in 2006. All her novels and collections are published by Canongate Books. Hird's first novel was published as part of the Rebel Inc. imprint at Canongate, where she also contributed to two anthologies alongside Alan Warner and Irvine Welsh.

== Bibliography ==
- Nail and Other Stories (1997)
- Born Free (1999)
- Hope and Other Urban Tales (2006)
- Dear Laura: Letters from a Mother to her Daughter (2007)
