= Vincent Cushing =

English cricketer (born 1950)

Personal information
- Full name: Vincent Gordon Burke Cushing
- Born: 17 January 1950 (age 76); Chichester, Sussex, England
- Batting: Right-handed

Domestic team information
- Years: Team
- 1971–1973: Oxford University

Career statistics
| Competition | First-class | List A |
|---|---|---|
| Matches | 14 | 1 |
| Runs scored | 565 | 0 |
| Batting average | 28.25 | – |
| 100s/50s | –/4 | –/– |
| Top score | 77* | – |
| Catches/stumpings | 7/– | –/– |
- Source: Cricinfo, 23 February 2020

Vincent Gordon Burke Cushing (born 17 January 1950) is an English former first-class cricketer.

Cushing was born at Chichester in January 1950. He later studied at Oriel College at the University of Oxford. While studying at Oxford, Cushing played first-class cricket for Oxford University, making his debut against Yorkshire at Oxford in 1971. He played first-class cricket for Oxford until 1973, making fourteen appearances. He scored a total of 565 runs in these matches, at an average of 28.25 and with a high score of 77 not out. Cushing also made a single appearance in List A cricket for Oxford University in the 1973 Benson & Hedges Cup against Warwickshire, though he was not called upon to bat.
