= Ros Simmons =

British businesswoman

Ros Simmons is a British businesswoman. She was the CEO of Vie at Home, a company for which she worked since it was launched in 1997, starting out as Marketing Director. In late 2008, Simmons successfully led a management buyout of the company, formerly known as Virgin Vie at Home, from Virgin Group. In December 2010, the company was sold to Helmut Spikker.

== Background ==
After her training at the London College of Fashion, Simmons joined The Body Shop. During her seven years with the company, she held the position of Brand Manager with global responsibility for the Colour Cosmetics division.

When she joined The Virgin Cosmetics Company as one of the founding directors she was given the task of growing Virgin Vie at Home into the UK's leading cosmetics party plan business as well as developing the cosmetic and skin care product ranges.

In January 2009, Simmons led a management buy-out of Virgin Vie at Home with her business partner Ratan Daryani. In order to take control of the company the team purchased the shares for £1. Further to this the Virgin Group wrote off £21m worth of loans and paid the new enterprise £7m worth of 'Brand Protection' payment, so that if the company failed, the Virgin Brand would not be endangered.

In late 2009, Simmons closed the final Effective Cosmetics (Previously Virgin Cosmetics) stores, putting the chain into Administration.

In 2010, Simmons was nominated for a Real Woman Award in the Retail & Consumer Section.

In December 2010, VIE was sold to Helmut Spikker for an undisclosed sum.

In May 2011, Simmons resigned from the Board of Directors of VIE.

== Personal background ==
Simmons lives with her husband Andy in West Sussex. Her hobbies include gardening, interior design and watching cricket.
