= Dear Octopus (film) =

1943 British film by Harold French

- Directed by: Harold French
- Written by: Patrick Kirwan; R. J. Minney; Esther McCracken (adaptation)
- Based on: the play by Dodie Smith
- Produced by: Edward Black
- Starring: Margaret Lockwood; Michael Wilding; Celia Johnson
- Cinematography: Arthur Crabtree
- Edited by: Michael C. Chorlton
- Music by: Hubert Bath
- Production company: Gainsborough Pictures
- Distributed by: General Film Distributors (UK)
- Release date: 20 September 1943 (UK)
- Running time: 86 minutes
- Country: United Kingdom
- Language: English

Dear Octopus (also known as The Randolph Family) is a 1943 British comedy film directed by Harold French and starring Margaret Lockwood, Michael Wilding and Celia Johnson. It was written by Patrick Kirwan and R. J. Minney from an adaptation by Esther McCracken of the 1938 play Dear Octopus by Dodie Smith.

== Plot ==
Well-to-do couple Dora and Charles Randolph are celebrating their golden wedding, and three generations meet at the Randolph country home. As the relatives gather, each reveals his or her personal quirks and shortcomings. Caught in the middle is family secretary Penny Fenton, who has the unenviable task of sorting and smoothing out the family's deep-set hostilities and jealousies so that a good time can be had by all.

== Cast ==
- Margaret Lockwood as Penny Fenton
- Michael Wilding as Nicholas Randolph
- Celia Johnson as Cynthia
- Roland Culver as Felix Martin
- Helen Haye as Dora Randolph
- Athene Seyler as Aunt Belle
- Jean Cadell as Vicar's wife
- Basil Radford as Kenneth
- Frederick Leister as Charles Randolph
- Nora Swinburne as Edna
- Antoinette Cellier as Hilda
- Madge Compton as Marjorie
- Kathleen Harrison as Mrs Glossop
- Ann Stephens as Scrap
- Derek Lansiaux as Bill
- Alistair Stewart as Joe
- Evelyn Hall as Gertrude
- Muriel George as cook
- Annie Esmond as nannie
- Irene Handl as Flora
- Arthur Denton as Mr Glossop
- Pamela Western as Deirdre
- Arty Ash as Burton
- Graham Moffatt as Fred the chauffeur
- Henry Morrell as vicar

== Production ==
The film was a rare comedy from Gainsborough at the time in that it was not a vehicle for a specific comic.

Lockwood made it after The Man in Grey in the spring of 1943. She wrote in her memoirs that "there had been some trouble over the script of this film. Neither Herbert [her agent] nor I had considered the part which was offered to me sufficiently good. After much arguing my part was built up, but even so I was not pleased with the film, and felt that for me it had been a backward step."

Director Harold French later said "I'd liked the play and thought I could make a picture of it and I think I did some of it well." He called it "a lovely film to make, very harmonious cast. I was delighted to get away from war films and make something light and frothy. It was just what the public wanted."

== Reception ==
=== Box office ===
Kine Weekly listed this film among those which were "runners up" in its survey of the most popular films in Britain in 1943.

=== Critical ===
The Monthly Film Bulletin wrote: "Production is conscientious and direction adequate, but the play – it remains a play photographed – is primarily an actors' piece."

The Daily Film Renter wrote: "Middle-class opulence and contrasting village gaucheries. Obscure development and overplus of dialogue. Pleasing characters and nostalgic free-from-war atmosphere. Good title booking for discerning audiences."

Kine Weekly wrote: "The story, or rather chapter of incidents, is a human, moving and amusing depiction of all that is best in English family life. Its sense of proportion is impeccable and excellent acting. Sensitive direction and flawless atmosphere make doubly sure that its many delicate and intriguing facets are gracefully and energetically illuminated. No British film, or for that matter American, has been better cast. Definitely a heartwarming, laughter-making mosaic. Excellent light booking for all classes, and the family and the women folk in particular."

TV Guide described the film as a "routine English comedy of manners", but added, "it has its moments."
