= London Books =

English independent publisher

- Founded: 2007
- Founders: John King and Martin Knight
- Country of origin: United Kingdom
- Headquarters location: London
- Distribution: Turnaround Publisher Services
- Publication types: Books
- Official website: www.london-books.co.uk

London Books is an independent publishers based in London, founded in 2007 by the authors John King and Martin Knight. It is notable for its London Classics imprint, which focuses on forgotten works of London working-class and realist fiction from the 20th century. London Books also runs a New Fiction list in the same spirit, and has released several non-fiction titles.

The London Classics series features writers such as Gerald Kersh and James Curtis, and each book comes with a new introduction by a contemporary author, among these the likes of Iain Sinclair and Cathi Unsworth. London Books’ New Fiction includes debuts by Pete Haynes and Dan Carrier. The Working Man’s Ballet by Alan Hudson – which comes with a Foreword and Afterword by John King and Martin Knight respectively – leads its non-fiction.

== Authors ==
• Simon Blumenfeld • Dan Carrier • James Curtis • Pete Haynes • Alan Hudson • Gerald Kersh • Arthur La Bern • Alan Sillitoe • John Sommerfield • Robert Westerby
