= White Trash (novel) =

2001 novel by John King

- First edition
- Author: John King
- Language: English
- Published: 2001
- Publisher: Jonathan Cape, Vintage
- Publication place: England
- Media type: Print
- Preceded by: Human Punk
- Followed by: The Prison House

White Trash is the fifth novel by English author John King, first published in 2001 by Jonathan Cape. The paperback edition of the book, released by Vintage, carries the following quote by Alan Sillitoe, author of Saturday Night And Sunday Morning, on its cover: "Complete and unique, all stitched up and marvellous, the two sides of the equation brought together, realistic yet philosophical." The quote also appears on the US edition of the novel (2016), which includes an introduction by the author—"From Cradle to Grave".

== Synopsis ==
Set in an unnamed new town on the outskirts of London, White Trash records the world as seen through the eyes of a hard-working ward nurse, Ruby James, and the remote, at times almost ghostly, administrator Jonathan Jeffreys, who drifts through her hospital. Their paths rarely cross, but the calculating outlook of Jeffreys begins to have terrible ramifications, and Ruby eventually becomes entangled in his web.

Working-class Ruby manages to keep her dignity, sense of humour, and sanity despite a life of daily struggle that includes wrestling with the pain of having a mother with Alzheimer's. Her unfailingly positive and inclusive take on life is in stark contrast to the exclusive viewpoint of the handsomely paid Jeffreys, who spends his hours in the glow of a computer screen and prefers the company of statistics to human beings.

Jeffreys' existence is based on cold reason, elitism, and an obsession with the rationing of healthcare that leads him to make extreme life-and-death decisions. Ruby's is about touch, feel, and emotion, treating her patients with respect while living out her unspoken belief that everyone has an equal right to care and attention.

In an interview in Nursing Times, King said: "The point of White Trash is that there is no white trash. Everyone is worth something and no-one can be dismissed. That's what we have to remember when it comes to the National Health Service." He calls the novel, "A defence of the NHS."

The book also considers the lives of a range of characters who are considered worthless by the establishment, but who actually offer far more to society than those who look down on them. Through these vignettes, as well as the main focus on the contrasts between Ruby James and Jonathan Jeffreys, King establishes that everyone should be valued, no matter their background, age, or condition. In the process, a vibrant culture of expression and experience is celebrated.

== Reception ==
Reviewing the novel for The Independent, Mat Coward wrote: "The cumulative effect of King's style is astonishingly powerful in its detail and depth. A quarter of a century after punk rock, the core punk ethos — of a robust and adaptable form of resistance, based on inclusive, DIY community-making and a concentration on immediacy — is still inspiring some of our most vital writers. An immensely timely and necessary book: stylish, witty and passionate. It's about time someone slapped the smugness from the face of broadsheet Britain." Big Issue North called White Trash "A state of the nation book."
