= Vie at Home =

Defunct cosmetics retailer

Vie at Home Ltd.
- Type: Limited company
- Industry: cosmetics
- Founded: 1997
- Founder: Virgin Group
- Defunct: 2011
- Headquarters: Tangmere, England, UK, United Kingdom
- Products: skin care, make up, bath & body, aromatherapy, jewellery, homeware
- Revenue: £10 million
- Number of employees: 4,000 consultants, approx. 50 head office employees
- Parent: Network World Alliance GmbH

Vie at Home (trademarked VIE at home), formerly The Virgin Cosmetics Company and Virgin Vie At Home, was a retailer and distributor of cosmetics. The company was formed as The Virgin Cosmetics Company by Mark and Liz Warom with the backing of the Virgin Group in 1997, and was renamed Virgin Vie at Home in 2006. Vie at Home specialised in the direct selling of make up, skin care, body care, jewellery and homeware.

In 2009 the business was bought from the Virgin Group by Ros Simmons and Ratan Daryani in a management buyout and renamed Vie at Home. Network World Alliance acquired the company in December 2010. Vie at Home entered liquidation in 2011.

== History ==
In January 1997, Mark and Liz Warom established the company with the backing of Sir Richard Branson's Virgin Group, naming it The Virgin Cosmetics Company. It was based in Chichester, West Sussex, and launched with the objective of selling products through retail outlets, party plan selling and mail order. It was planned that 100 stores would be opened within the first five years. Ros Simmons was appointed marketing director in February that year in preparation for the launch of the business.

The company rebranded its stores as Virgin Cosmetics in February 1999, having struggled to make an impact.

In April 2001, the company announced a deal with Luxasia pte Ltd, as a distributor for the Asia region. The licence covered Singapore, Malaysia, Hong Kong, Taiwan, Indonesia, Korea, India and China. Virgin Vie Spa Treatment Rooms opened in Cape Town, South Africa in February 2002. By October 2002, Virgin Cosmetics employed around 7,000 consultants. The company withdrew from the Asian market in April 2003, closing all nine stores in Hong Kong, Taiwan, Malaysia and Singapore. Virgin Cosmetics began to open factory outlets across the UK in September 2003. In September 2005, the company launched in South Africa, recruiting over 1000 consultants in 12 months.

The company was rebranded as Virgin Vie at Home in September 2006. It launched a direct selling business in the United Arab Emirates in December 2006.

In January 2009, Virgin Vie At Home was sold in a management buyout to Ratan Daryani and Ros Simmons. The company was relaunched as Vie at Home as the Virgin Group had paid £8.8 million to remove the Virgin name, and written off £21 million in loans.

In December 2010, Network World Alliance bought the company. Vie at Home's warehouse facility in Stockton-on-Tees was moved to Ahlen in Germany as a result.

Ratan Daryani, previously chairman and owner of the company resigned from the business on 7 January 2011. HM Revenue and Customs (HMRC) began the process of winding up the company at the High Court in London on 20 January 2011. The action was dismissed on 2 February 2011.

The company announced in April 2011 that it would cease trading in Germany on 31 May 2011. Vie at Home had launched in the market in September 2009. Ros Simmons, the chief executive, resigned from the board of directors on 23 May 2011. By that time, the company was overdue in filing its accounts to Companies House, listing the last accounts as due on 20 October 2010 but not received. The company began a restructuring in July 2011 by discontinuing all aromatherapy, homeware and jewellery lines, and continued to integrate with Network World Alliance.

Vie at home Ltd. filed for liquidation in August 2011, writing off over £2 million of debt owed to suppliers and HMRC. The brand 'Vie at home' continued to trade under another company Vie Cosmetics Group Ltd., using new suppliers. On 16 September 2011 it was proposed that the holding company and owner of the VIE brand be struck off of the Register of Companies, having never submitted any accounts since the business was bought from the Virgin Group in December 2008.

On 26 September 2011 the administrators of the purchasing company (VCP) issued a statement, explaining that the directors (Ros Simmons and Ratan Daryani) had been trying to sell the group since it was bought from the Virgin Group in 2008. On 21 December 2010 the shares in VIE Cosmetics Group Ltd were sold to NWA Ventures GmbH who controlled total ownership, management and financial responsibility of the group. The company owed a total of over £5 million to its suppliers. The administrator noted that there was little likelihood of anyone other than the warehouse operator (who had exercised their right to take charge of the companies stock in exchange for payment) receiving payment.

It was announced in late March 2012 that Vie Cosmetics Group Ltd., owner of the VIE at home brand, would enter administration.

In an initial report to creditors, Portland Business & Financial Solutions (appointed to run the company in Administration), reported that there would be a dividend available to pay off some of its debts, but did not disclose the amount. A proposal was due by 18 June 2012.

== Products ==
Vie at Home specialised in cosmetics, jewellery and homeware. The cosmetics range consisted of skin care, make up, bath & body and aromatherapy products. The jewellery range was designed in-house. The homeware range had two launches per year - one for summer and one for winter. The product range consisted of soft furnishings for the home including pillows, throws, picture frames, candles, bed linen and bathroom accessories.

== Charity ==
Vie at Home supported CLIC Sargent between 2006 and 2011.

== Awards ==
Virgin Cosmetics received the Innovation and Excellence Award from the Direct Selling Association (DSA) in May 2003 for its contributions to direct selling, and June 2004.

In February 2005 Virgin Cosmetics won the 'Direct Sales Team of the Year Award' at the National Sales Awards.

== Turnover ==
Year	Turnover
2006	£67.5m
2007	£56.3m
2008	£48.5m
2009	Unknown
2010	Unknown
2011	£10m (Pro-rata)
