= There Ain't No Justice (novel) =

1937 novel

- 1st edition Cape hardback, 1937
- Author: James Curtis
- Language: English
- Genre: Sports Drama
- Publisher: Jonathan Cape (UK); Knopf (US)
- Publication date: 1937
- Media type: Print

There Ain't No Justice is sports novel by the British writer James Curtis first published in 1937 by Jonathan Cape. The novel was republished in 2014 by London Books as the tenth title in its London Classics series with a contemporary introduction by Martin Knight.

== Blurb ==
"A large collection of local thugs, bullies, loafers, and ordinary working people are all vividly portrayed against a background of tenements, saloons, and boxing clubs."

== Synopsis ==
A promising young boxer, Tommy Mutch, is convinced to turn professional and becomes involved with a successful promoter Sammy Sanders. At first Mutch enjoys a string of victories but is horrified when he discovers that Sanders wants him to take a dive in his next fight. He refuses to co-operate and retires from fighting, but when his sister urgently needs money, Mutch is forced to go back into the ring for a final time.

== Film adaptation ==
In 1939 the novel was adapted into a film made by Ealing Studios. It was the directorial debut of Pen Tennyson and stars Jimmy Hanley and Edward Chapman. The screenplay was partly written by Curtis, adapting his own novel.

== Bibliography ==
- Barr, Charles. Ealing Studios. Cameron Books, 1998.
