= Pen Tennyson =

English film director (1912–1941)

- Born: Frederick Penrose Tennyson; 26 August 1912; Chelsea, London, England
- Died: 7 July 1941 (aged 28)
- Occupation: Film director
- Years active: 1934–1941
- Spouse: Nova Pilbeam (1939–1941)

Frederick Penrose "Pen" Tennyson (26 August 1912 – 7 July 1941) was a British film director whose promising career was cut short when he died in a plane crash. Tennyson gained experience as an assistant director to Alfred Hitchcock in several of his British films during the 1930s. Tennyson directed three films between 1939 and his death in 1941.

== Background ==
Tennyson was the eldest of three sons of Charles Tennyson, through whom he was a great-grandson of the poet Alfred, Lord Tennyson.

He went to Eton College and married actress Nova Pilbeam in 1939.

== Film career ==
Tennyson entered the film industry in May 1932 after his mother introduced him to C.M. Woolf, the business partner of producer Michael Balcon. He began his career as a camera assistant at Gaumont British Studios at Shepherd's Bush. He developed a very close relationship with Balcon which lasted for the rest of his life; Balcon's children both later commented that their father "regarded him as a son".

At Gaumont, he was assigned to assist Hitchcock on his original version of The Man Who Knew Too Much (1934), on which he met his future wife. He also assisted Hitchcock on The 39 Steps (1935) with Robert Donat and Madeleine Carroll; during filming, Hitchcock reportedly humiliated Tennyson by pretending that Carroll had refused to be carried across the Scottish marsh set by Donat, and he forced Tennyson to don Carroll's wig and costume and double for her in the scene.

Tennyson followed Balcon when he was appointed head of production at the former Associated Talking Pictures, newly renamed as Ealing Studios. Under Balcon, Tennyson made his first feature as a director, There Ain't No Justice (1939), a contemporary drama about a young boxer, which writer Matthew Sweet describes as "one of the first British films of the sound era to make a serious attempt to represent the lives of working-class Londoners".

Tennyson's second film, The Proud Valley (1940), stars Paul Robeson as an American sailor who goes to work in a Welsh coal mine and is co-opted into the town's choir. It marked Robeson's return to films after a two-year hiatus, which had been precipitated in part by his bad experiences on his first British film, the colonialist epic Sanders of the River (1935), which he subsequently disowned for its racism.

The impending war forced Balcon and Tennyson to tone down the radical political content contained in the original script of The Proud Valley, and on its release its commercial prospects were sabotaged after Robeson spoke out about the Nazi-Soviet pact of August 1939 and Britain's unwillingness to unite with the Soviet Union against Germany. According to later revelations by Michael Foot, Robeson's comments enraged press baron Lord Beaverbrook, who placed the actor on a secret blacklist (which also included Noël Coward), boycotting any mention of the film or its star in his newspapers.

Tennyson's final film was the wartime propaganda piece Convoy (1940), which starred Clive Brook and stage actress Judy Campbell, who retained bitter memories of her poor treatment by the Ealing crew, which included having her eyebrows forcibly shaved off by the Ealing make-up man.

== Death ==
Following the completion of Convoy in May 1940, Tennyson took up a long-deferred commission in the Royal Navy and at the end of June 1941 he was recruited for the Admiralty's instructional films unit. After spending a few days with the Balcon family in London, Tennyson left for a shoot at Scapa Flow; when shooting completed on 7 July 1941 he sent a telegram to his wife saying "Will be with you tomorrow evening – cheers", and boarded a plane to Rosyth. One hour later, in fine weather, the plane ploughed into a hillside, killing all aboard. He is buried in Dunfermline (Douglas Bank) Cemetery. One of his two brothers, Julian Tennyson, died in March 1945 in Burma.

== Filmography ==
- There Ain't No Justice (1939)
- The Proud Valley (1940)
- Convoy (1940)
