= John Sommerfield =

British writer and left-wing activist (1908–1991)

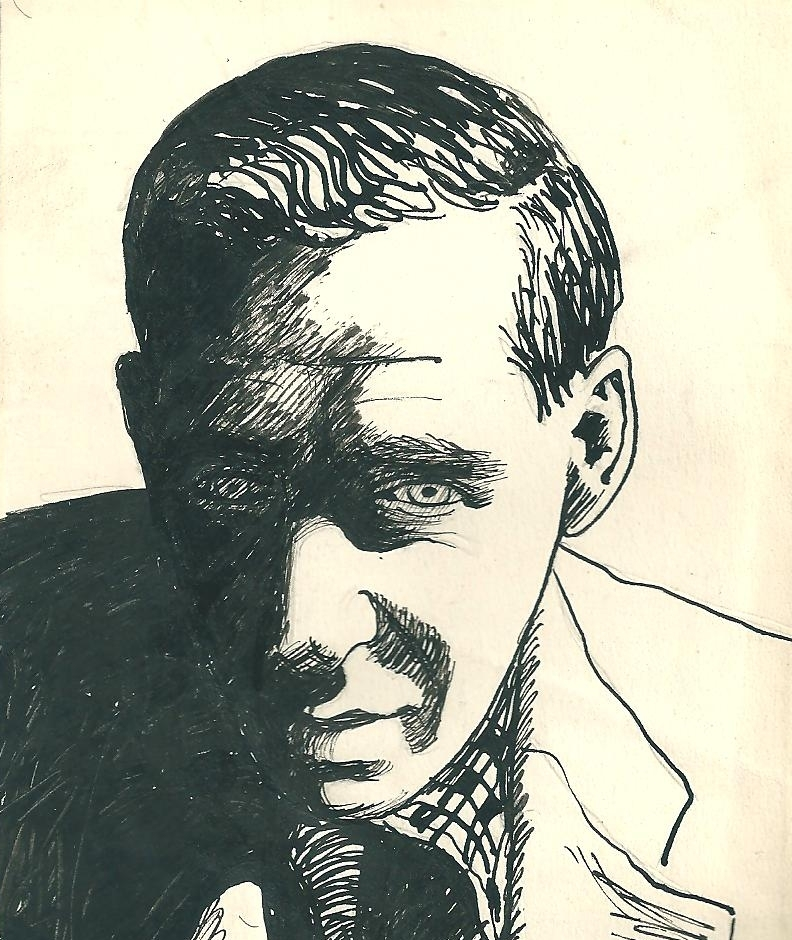
- 1940s ink drawing of John Sommerfield
- Born: Jack Hugo Sommerfeld; 25 June 1908; London
- Died: 13 August 1991 (aged 83); Oxfordshire
- Occupations: Writer, communist, veteran of spanish civil war

John Sommerfield (25 June 1908 – 13 August 1991) was a British writer and left-wing activist known for his influential novel May Day, which fictionalised a Communist upheaval in 1930s London. Sommerfield volunteered to fight in the Spanish Civil War and wrote one of the first combatant accounts of that conflict. He later served in the Royal Air Force in World War II.

== Early life ==
Born Jack Hugo Sommerfield in West London, Sommerfield left University College School at the age of 16 and worked as a newspaper delivery boy, stage hand and merchant seaman before moving to the Chelsea area, where he was active in the Communist party. He appears to have joined the Communist Party in the early 1930s and it was a major part of his life for the following quarter-of-a-century. He wrote columns for several Communist periodicals, including the Daily Worker, and was active in the Communist Party Writers' Group.

== Career ==
Sommerfield's first two books, They Die Young (1930) – which was published in the United States as The Death of Christopher – and Behind the Scenes (1934) drew upon his experiences at sea and as a stage hand. 1936 saw the publication of May Day, which is considered Sommerfield's most important work. The novel was published by the Communist Party's publishing house, and describes a few days in the lives of protagonist James Seton and various other people around London leading up to a general strike and a political breakthrough for Communism in Britain.

Shortly after the publication of May Day, Sommerfield volunteered for the International Brigades, fighting in the Spanish Civil War alongside his friend John Cornford. After returning he discovered that he had been reported dead. During World War II he served as an aircraft support mechanic in Burma and India. This wartime service in Asia with the RAF provided the inspiration for some of his best short stories, collected after the war as The Survivors (1947).

In 1937 Sommerfield published Volunteer in Spain, which was an account of his time in Spain. George Orwell called the memoir a "piece of sentimental tripe", while others praised it and called Sommerfield "an excellent writer". The book was dedicated to Cornford, who was killed in Spain in December 1936. Malcolm Lowry, a close friend of Sommerfield's, counted him as an important influence, and dedicated his poem Song About Madrid, Useful Any Time to him and Julian Bell.

Perhaps the most widely read of Sommerfield's works was Trouble in Porter Street, published in 1939. The Communist Party asked Sommerfield to write a manual about how to organise a rent strike. He wrote a short story for this purpose instead which was published cheaply as a pamphlet and sold in tens of thousands. Sommerfield was also active in the Mass Observation project and took the lead in the research, largely in Bolton, for The Pub and the People.

Throughout the war and in the following decade, Sommerfield continued to write for Communist and progressive periodicals and literary journals, including John Lehmann's New Writing journal and was involved with Mass Observation. He worked largely in documentary films. Among his writing, The Adversaries (1952) was a historical novel based on the life of the mathematician Evariste Galois, while North West Five (1960) was a novel about a young working class couple struggling to make their own way in post-war Kentish Town in north London.

== Personal life ==
Sommerfield married twice and had a son, Peter, by his first wife. After the war, he lived with his second wife, the artist and illustrator Molly Moss, in Hampstead and Gospel Oak in north London before moving to Oxfordshire where he died in 1991.

== Selected works ==
- Sommerfield, John (1930). They Die Young. W. Heinemann.
- Sommerfield, John (1934). Behind the Scenes. T. Nelson and sons, Limited. LCCN 35018826.
- Sommerfield, John (1936). May Day. Lawrence & Wishart republished London Books. ISBN 9780955185182. (republished in 1984 and 2010)
- Sommerfield, John (1937). Volunteer in Spain. Lawrence & Wishart in UK and Knopf in US. LCCN 37031226.
- Sommerfield, John (1939). Trouble in Porter Street. (republished in 1954)
- Mass-Observation (1943). The Pub and the People: a Worktown study. Victor Gollancz. ISBN 9780851290508.
- Sommerfield, John (1947). The Survivors. J. Lehmann. LCCN a48003265.
- Sommerfield, John (1952). The Adversaries. Heinemann.
- Sommerfield, John (1956). The Inheritance. Heinemann.
- Sommerfield, John (1960). North West Five. Heinemann.
- Sommerfield, John (1978). The Imprinted. London Magazine Editions. ISBN 9780904388268.
