= The Football Factory (novel) =

1997 novel by John King

- First edition
- Headhunters; England Away
- Author: John King
- Country: United Kingdom
- Language: English
- Publisher: Jonathan Cape; Vintage
- Published: May 1997
- Media type: Print (paperback)
- OCLC: 35167891
- Followed by: Headhunters

The Football Factory is the controversial debut novel by English author John King, based around the adventures of a group of working-class Londoners who follow Chelsea home and away, fighting their rivals on the streets of England's cities.

The principal character/narrator is Tommy Johnson, whose internal monologues allow the reader an inside view of football hooliganism and the adrenaline highs involved. Major battles take place with Chelsea's traditional enemies, among them Tottenham and Millwall. The language used is hard-hitting but imaginative, as Tommy's frustration and outspoken views on life in modern-day Britain delve into a range of subjects, including class, patriotism, prejudice, poverty, and the political system.

Equally as important to the novel's structure is the presence of pensioner Bill Farrell, a former soldier who fought in the Second World War and was decorated for his bravery. After the war, he married a concentration camp survivor and is trying to cope with her recent death. He is seen as a hero by subsequent generations, among them Tommy and various older members of the Chelsea firm, hardcore hooligans such as Dave Harris and Billy Bright.

Farrell is a calmer voice, but while his more measured reflections present an alternative approach to that of the younger men, he shares their frustrations and feelings of powerlessness. Vignettes from a range of minor characters are also included, among them the story of Vince Matthews, a former hooligan who has broken out of the circle of violence to travel the world.

The Football Factory is rich in cultural references, from popular music to the songs and chants of the terraces. Tommy remembers the glory days of the Shed at Stamford Bridge, the Chelsea North Stand, and Gate 13, and presents his own assessments of opposing players and supporters. The role of a sensationalist media and the hypocrisy of the political classes are highlighted in relation to football-connected violence, with modern warfare brought into the equation. London is shown in detail, the allegiance to a football club as an extension of community, in many cases involving populations that have been displaced.

The novel has been translated into a number of languages and was followed by Headhunters and England Away. Together, they make up The Football Factory Trilogy. In 2004, the book was turned into a film by director Nick Love, starring Danny Dyer as Tommy Johnson and Dudley Sutton as Bill Farrell.
