= Ourselves Alone =

Ourselves Alone may refer to:

- Ourselves Alone (slogan), inaccurate translation of sinn féin
- Ourselves Alone (film), 1936 British film
- Ourselves Alone (Boardwalk Empire), second episode of the second season
- Ourselves Alone (Terminator: The Sarah Connor Chronicles), seventeenth episode of the second season

== See also ==
- Not for Ourselves Alone
- Non nobis solum
