= Beau James =

1957 film

- Directed by: Melville Shavelson
- Written by: Jack Rose; Melville Shavelson
- Produced by: Jack Rose
- Starring: Bob Hope; Vera Miles; Paul Douglas; Alexis Smith; Darren McGavin
- Narrated by: Walter Winchell
- Cinematography: John F. Warren
- Edited by: Floyd Knudtson
- Music by: Joseph J. Lilley
- Production companies: Hope Enterprises; Scribe Productions
- Distributed by: Paramount Pictures
- Release date: June 7, 1957
- Running time: 105 minutes
- Country: United States
- Language: English
- Box office: $1.75 million (US)

Beau James is a 1957 American drama film directed by Melville Shavelson and starring Bob Hope, Vera Miles, Paul Douglas and Alexis Smith. It is based on a 1944 non-fiction book of the same name by Gene Fowler. The film features Hope in a rare dramatic role as Jimmy Walker, the colorful but controversial Mayor of New York City from 1926 to 1932.

== Plot ==
In 1925, New York's governor, Al Smith, persuades state senator James J. "Jimmy" Walker that the Democratic Party needs him to run for mayor of New York City. A concern on Jimmy's part is his estrangement from wife Allie, but he discovers that she is willing to go along with his political aims.

Under the guidance of Chris Nolan, his political mentor, Jimmy wins the election in a landslide. He later learns, though, that Allie has no intention of renewing their relationship. She is simply satisfied to be the great city's first lady.

A drunken Jimmy is found on a park bench by Betty Compton, who takes him home, not knowing who he is. She scolds him for his behavior upon learning Jimmy is the mayor, and a mutual attraction develops. He uses his political connections to help find her a job.

Such favors and graft become a focal point in 1929's reelection campaign, when opponent Fiorello LaGuardia mocks the mayor publicly and questions the current administration's integrity. Jimmy also goes bankrupt as a result of the stock market crash, and Betty grows despondent over his inability or unwillingness to get Allie to consent to a divorce.

Still popular with the public, Jimmy is reelected. He tries to bring Betty to his victory party, but it is against his colleagues' wishes. Tired of being hidden, Betty attempts suicide. She is hustled out of the country by Chris and impulsively marries a man who has been courting her.

The charges against Jimmy lead fellow Democrats to believe he could hurt Franklin D. Roosevelt's presidential hopes for 1932. Jimmy admits to having accepted bribes and favors, claiming all successful politicians do. His popularity erodes. Spectators at a Yankee Stadium baseball game boo him for the first time. Jimmy offers his resignation as mayor in a speech from the field. He decides to leave New York, whereupon Betty, after a quick divorce, intends to join him, married or not.

== Cast ==
- Bob Hope as James J. Walker
- Vera Miles as Betty Compton
- Paul Douglas as Chris Nolan
- Alexis Smith as Allie Walker
- Darren McGavin as Charley Hand
- Joe Mantell as Bernie Williams
- Horace McMahon as Prosecutor
- Richard Shannon as Dick Jackson
- Willis Bouchey as Arthur Julian
- Sid Melton as Sid Nash
- George Jessel as himself
- Walter Catlett as Al Smith
- Jack Benny as himself (uncredited)
- Jimmy Durante as himself (uncredited)
- Dick Nelson as Franklin D. Roosevelt (uncredited)
- Joe Turkel as Reporter (uncredited)

== Production ==
Beau James was the second of two major dramatic roles Hope ever attempted in his long film career, the first being The Seven Little Foys released two years earlier. Beau James also marked his final film for Paramount Pictures, ending a 20-year association with the studio that began with Hope's breakthrough role in The Big Broadcast of 1938 (1938). American prints of this film are narrated by Walter Winchell; in Britain, the film was narrated by Alistair Cooke.

One of the more memorable lines is when Walker is asked at a baseball game about a personal conduct scandal and replies: "My comment, and you can quote me, is I hope the Yankees win." Although Walker was actually the 97th mayor of New York, in a scene with reporters after his election, Hope claims he was the 100th.

The film includes cameo musical appearances by Jimmy Durante and Jack Benny as themselves. This was the final film of veteran comic actor Walter Catlett. Stock music from composers Elmer Bernstein, Nelson Riddle, David Rose and Victor Young is used throughout.
