= The Right to Live =

The Right to Live may refer to:

- The Right to Live (1921 film), a British silent drama
- The Right to Live (1927 film), a German silent film
- The Right to Live (1933 film), a British crime film
- The Right to Live (1935 film), an American drama
