= Too Many Millions =

1934 film by Harold Young

- Viola Keats, Betty Compton and John Garrick in the film.
- Directed by: Harold Young
- Screenplay by: Brock Williams
- Produced by: Irving Asher
- Starring: Betty Compton; John Garrick; Viola Keats
- Production company: Warner Brothers First National Productions
- Release date: 4 February 1935
- Running time: 57 minutes
- Country: United Kingdom
- Language: English

Too Many Millions (1934) is a British comedy drama film directed by Harold Young and starring Betty Compton, John Garrick and Viola Keats. It was written by Brock Williams, and was made as a quota quickie by Warner Brothers/First National Productions.

== Preservation status ==
The British Film Institute National Archive holds a collection of stills but no film or video materials.

== Premise ==
In an attempt to attract the attention of the artist she loves, a wealthy woman assumes the disguise of a maid.

== Cast ==
- Betty Compton as Anne
- John Garrick as Bill
- Viola Keats as Viola
- Athole Stewart as Mr Olcott
- James Carew as Mr Worthing
- Martita Hunt as Mrs Pilcher
- Phyllis Stanley as Tamara
- Sybil Grove as Mrs Runcorn

== Reception ==
Kine Weekly wrote: "Romantic comedy-drama, silly childish stuff, poorly directed and indifferently portrayed. The film takes such an unconscionable time to reach its obvious happy ending that boredom overtakes it long before it comes to a merciful close. Apart from its quota ticket and convenient length, it is destitute of booking angles. ... Betty Compton makes quite an attractive Anne, but the story fails to put her talents to the test. John Garrick, Vie Keats, Athole Stewart and James Carew are but unhappy passengers in supporting roles."

The Daily Film Renter wrote: "Development fails to achieve conviction, being novelettish in design. Betty Compton plays leading role with charm, making appealing British film debut. ... Direction is no more than adequate."

Picture Show wrote: "There is littie conviction in this story ... . Naively told, competently acted."
