= Her Reputation =

Her Reputation may refer to:

- Her Reputation a 1923 novel by Talbot Mundy
- Her Reputation (1923 film), a 1923 silent film drama, based on the novel
- Her Reputation (1931 film), a 1931 British comedy film
