= Murder of Moll McCarthy =

Irish crime victim

Coordinates: 52.4370067°N 7.9073011°W

Location of Marlhill (Cnocán an Mharla) in Ireland

Mary McCarthy, known as Moll Carthy (1902–20/21 November 1940), was a woman, mother, smallholder, possible sex worker, and murder victim from Marlhill, near New Inn, County Tipperary in Ireland. Henry "Harry" Gleeson (1903–23 April 1941) from Holycross, County Tipperary, was convicted of her murder and executed, but granted a posthumous pardon in 2015.

== Victim ==
Mary McCarthy or Carthy, known as Moll, was an unmarried mother who had seven children by at least six different fathers between 1921 and 1940. She lived in a rundown cottage on a two-acre plot beside a farm belonging to John Ceasar, from whose well she drew water. It has been claimed that she lived by bartering sexual favours for produce and services. Her scandalous lifestyle attracted opprobrium and the cottage's thatched roof was destroyed by arson in 1926. Local judge Seán Troy refused two applications to have her children taken into an orphanage, persuaded that she was a good mother.

== Crime and sentence ==
Harry Gleeson was Ceasar's nephew by marriage and worked the farm for him. On 21 November 1940, Gleeson reported finding McCarthy's body, with two gunshot wounds to the face, in the "Dug-Out Field" of his uncle's farm. The Garda Síochána arrested Gleeson on 30 November, claiming he was the father of McCarthy's youngest child, who had recently died in infancy, and that he feared his uncle would disinherit him if he found this out. Gleeson denied any "immoral association" with McCarthy or "hand, act or part" in her murder. He was tried at the Central Criminal Court in Dublin, found guilty on 27 February 1941, and sentenced to death. Appeals to the Fianna Fáil government for clemency were rejected, and he was hanged by Thomas Pierrepoint in Mountjoy Prison and buried in the prison yard.

== Pardon ==
Seán MacBride was junior counsel to James Nolan-Whelan in defending Gleeson, and later claimed his opposition to the death penalty was prompted by his certainty that Gleeson was innocent. The Farcical Trial of Harry Gleeson, privately published by Gleeson's friend Bill O'Connor in the 1980s, maintained that Gleeson was framed. The book spurred historian and lawyer Marcus Bourke to write Murder at Marlhill, published in 1993, which offered evidence of Gleeson's innocence. Cathal O'Shannon presented a documentary on RTÉ in 1995 based on Bourke's book. The Justice for Harry Gleeson Group was established locally to gather evidence and campaign, and it later contacted the Irish Innocence Project, the Innocence Network's Irish affiliate at Griffith College Dublin. In 2013 the Irish Innocence Project sent its file to the Department of Justice and Equality. Minister Alan Shatter sent it to Máire Whelan, the Attorney General, who got senior counsel Shane Murphy to review it. Deficiencies in the case were noted:

- medical evidence suggested the death was probably on 21 November, when Gleeson had an alibi, whereas the prosecution exaggerated the likelihood that it was on 20 November
- failure to call John Ceasar or his wife Brigid as witnesses
- the Garda stage-managed a confrontation between Gleeson and two of the McCarthy children to reflect badly on him
- failure to introduce the local shotgun register in evidence

Murphy reported that the conviction was based on "unconvincing circumstantial evidence" and recommended a pardon. On 1 April 2015, Shatter's successor as minister, Frances Fitzgerald, announced that the government would direct the President of Ireland to exercise his right to pardon under Article 13.6 of the Constitution of Ireland. President Michael D. Higgins formally signed the pardon order on 19 December 2015. This was presented to Gleeson's family at a ceremony on 13 January 2016. Some family members complained that the document used "Harry" rather than "Henry" as Gleeson's forename.

== Reinterment ==
Numerous searches were conducted in search of Gleeson's remains with one five-year search failing to recover his remains. In 2023, it was announced that land at Mountjoy Prison was to be excavated with the aim of recovering the remains of prisoners, including Gleeson. In 2024, the Department of Justice informed the Gleeson family that Harry Gleeson's remains had been positively identified. His funeral notice was posted 83 years after he was hanged. It was announced that Gleeson was to be reinterred in Holycross, Co. Tipperary in July 2024.

== Theories ==
Kieran Fagan believed that Marcus Bourke knew who was responsible for McCarthy's murder and chose not to name the murderer in his 1993 book. Fagan, in 2015, published The Framing of Harry Gleeson, which claimed McCarthy was murdered by local Irish Republican Army (IRA) members suspecting that she was an informant for the local Garda sergeant, Anthony Delaney. Fagan suggests Seán MacBride's past as IRA Chief of Staff prevented him from following up this angle. Other possible culprits mentioned by Brendan Ó Cathaoir in 2001 were the Gardaí or the father of the seventh child. Fagan's book caused controversy by naming the alleged fathers of McCarthy's children, many of them married. Of those, he alleges that one was involved in the murder and others knew that Gleeson was innocent, but were content to have the scandal of their relationship to the victim kept hidden.

== Other works ==
We Are Seven, a 1955 novel based on McCarthy's life, was written by Una Troy, daughter of judge Seán Troy who had kept McCarthy's children with her.

A 1958 film adaptation, She Didn't Say No, was banned by the Irish Film Censor for immorality. Thanks to the European initiative A Season of Classic Films of the Association des Cinémathèques Européennes (ACE), the film has been digitised in early 2021 and made possible to release online with an introduction on the film’s preservation and history.

Carlo Gébler's 2011 novel The Dead Eight is also based on the murder case.

== See also ==
- List of unsolved murders
