= The Tenth Man (1936 film) =

- Opening title
- Directed by: Brian Desmond Hurst
- Written by: Dudley Leslie; Marjorie Deans; Jack Davies; Geoffrey Kerr
- Based on: play The Tenth Man by W. Somerset Maugham
- Produced by: Walter C. Mycroft
- Starring: John Davis Lodge; Antoinette Cellier; Athole Stewart
- Cinematography: Walter J. Harvey
- Edited by: James Corbett
- Music by: Harry Acres (uncredited)
- Production company: British International Pictures
- Distributed by: Wardour Films (UK)
- Release date: 12 August 1936 (London)
- Running time: 68 minutes
- Country: United Kingdom
- Language: English

The Tenth Man is a 1936 British drama film directed by Brian Desmond Hurst and starring John Davis Lodge, Antoinette Cellier and Athole Stewart. It was written by Dudley Leslie, Marjorie Deans, Jack Davies and Geoffrey Kerr based on the 1910 play The Tenth Man by W. Somerset Maugham.

== Plot ==
George Winter is a self-made businessman and M.P., who lets nothing stand in the way of his ambition, believing that nine out of ten men are rogues or fools. Whenever Winter meets a rival who can't be bought, he destroys them through methods both legal and underhand. His wife Catherine is intent on divorce, but with the scandal potentially damaging to his election campaign, Winter blackmails her into staying with him. Then, Winter meets his 'tenth man': Jim Ford, a victim who refuses to be silenced by threat or bribery, who has the power to expose one of Winter's shady gold mine deals, and bring his house of cards crashing down.

== Cast ==
- John Davis Lodge as George Winter
- Antoinette Cellier as Catherine Winter
- Athole Stewart as Lord Etchingham
- Clifford Evans as Ford
- Iris Hoey as Lady Etchingham
- Aileen Marson as Anne Echingham
- Frank Cochrane as Bennett
- George Graves as Colonel Trent
- Bruce Lester as Edward O'Donnell
- Barry Sinclair as Robert Colby
- Antony Holles as Swalescliffe
- Aubrey Mallalieu as bank manager

== Critical reception ==
The Monthly Film Bulletin wrote: "This film hasa clear-cut, dramatic story, and is quick-moving with vigorous action. It is, however, unequal and there are weak patches. The tone is cynical, and the characters mainly unsympathetic. John Lodge proves himself a really fine actor in an impressive and effective character study."

Writing for The Spectator in 1936, Graham Greene gave the film a good review, lauding director Hurst for his "well-directed film" and noting that "there was nothing in Mr Hurst's two previous films, Riders to the Sea and Ourselves Alone, to show him capable of these humorous and satirical political sequences, and the very fine melodramatic close". Greene's only complaint was directed to the acting of actor Lodge whose performance appeared stiff.

TV Guide gave the film two out of five stars, calling it "An intriguing drama. ... Cleverly written from a play by W. Somerset Maugham."
