= Inside the Room =

- Opening titles
- Directed by: Leslie S. Hiscott
- Written by: Harry Fowler Mear
- Based on: play by Marten Cumberland
- Produced by: Julius Hagen
- Cinematography: William Luff
- Edited by: Michael C. Chorlton
- Music by: W.L. Trytel
- Production company: Julius Hagen Productions
- Distributed by: Universal Pictures
- Release date: March 1935
- Running time: 66 minutes
- Country: United Kingdom
- Language: English

Inside the Room is a 1935 British mystery film directed by Leslie S. Hiscott and starring Austin Trevor, Dorothy Boyd and George Hayes. It was written by Harry Fowler Mear, adapted from the play by Marten Cumberland, and shot at Twickenham Studios. The film's sets were designed by the studio's resident art director James A. Carter.

== Plot ==
A once famous actress dies, and soon afterwards two men mentioned in her diary are found murdered. With their investigation getting nowhere, the police involve amateur detective Pierre Santos, known for his particular powers of observation. Sir George Frame receives a postal warning that he is to be the next victim, and he is indeed murdered. Santos saves a fourth potential victim by revealing the killer to be the dead woman's son.

== Cast ==
- Austin Trevor as Pierre Santos
- Dorothy Boyd as Dorothy Ayres
- George Hayes as Henry Otisse
- Garry Marsh as Geoffrey Luce
- Brian Buchel as Adam Steele
- Robert Horton as Sir George Frame
- Frederick Burtwell as Inspector Grant
- Marjorie Chard as Lady Groombridge
- Vera Bogetti as Agnes Judd
- Dorothy Minto as Lilian Hope
- Kenji Takase as manservant / cook
- Claude Horton as Detective Dyson
- Kathleen Harrison as nurse

== Reception ==
Kine Weekly wrote: "Workmanlike murder mystery drama of the find-the-killer type, set against not unfamiliar background of country-house party. Story is developed on straightforward lines with the solution of the mystery reasonably well concealed until the last few hundred feet. In fact, the film has all the merits of its type as a sound second-feature proposition for popular halls."

The Daily Film Renter wrote: "Although most ot this picture is developed on lines of dialogue, the climax has a fair amount of action, and no few suspense values. The identity of the murderer is cleverly hidden until almost the final shot."
