= Iris Hoey =

British actress (1885–1979)

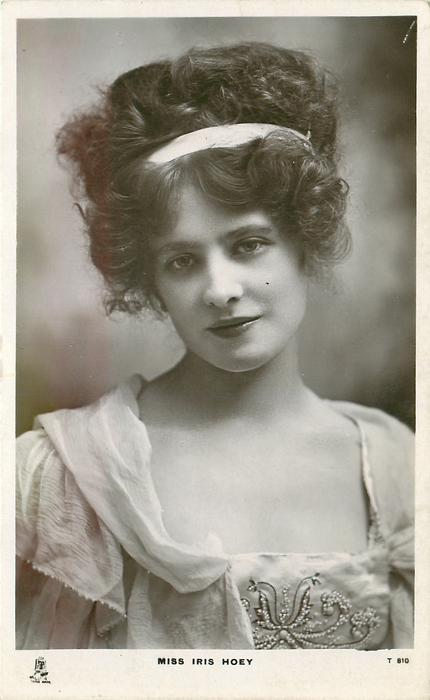
- Hoey in 1903
- Born: 17 July 1885; London, England
- Died: 13 May 1979 (aged 93); London, England

Wilhelmina Iris Winifred Hasbach (17 July 1885 – 13 May 1979), known professionally as Iris Hoey, was a British stage and film actress in the first half of the 20th century.

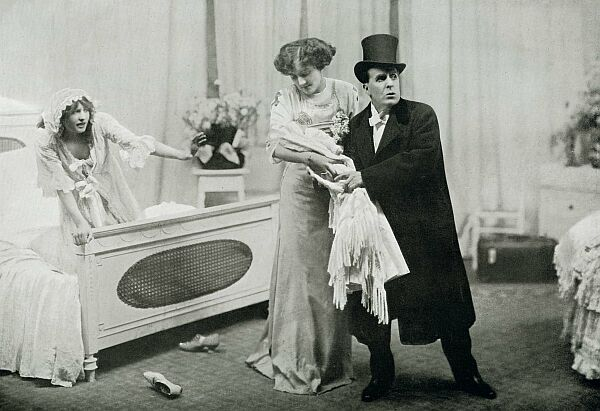
Iris Hoey (left), Lilias Waldegrave, and Weedon Grossmith in Baby Mine, Criterion Theatre, 1911

== Early life ==
Hoey was born in London, daughter of Wilhelm Anton Hasbach, a professor of political economy.

== Career ==
In the early part of her career, Hoey alternated performances in straight theatre alongside Beerbohm Tree with musical comedy with George Edwardes; she appeared in minor musical roles in Les P'tites Michu and the 1906 revival of The Geisha.

Her first film appearance was in East Lynne (1922), an adaptation of the 1861 sensation novel by Mrs Henry Wood; during her busiest period of film work (the 1930s), in 1934 she appeared in the West End in the play Mary Read.

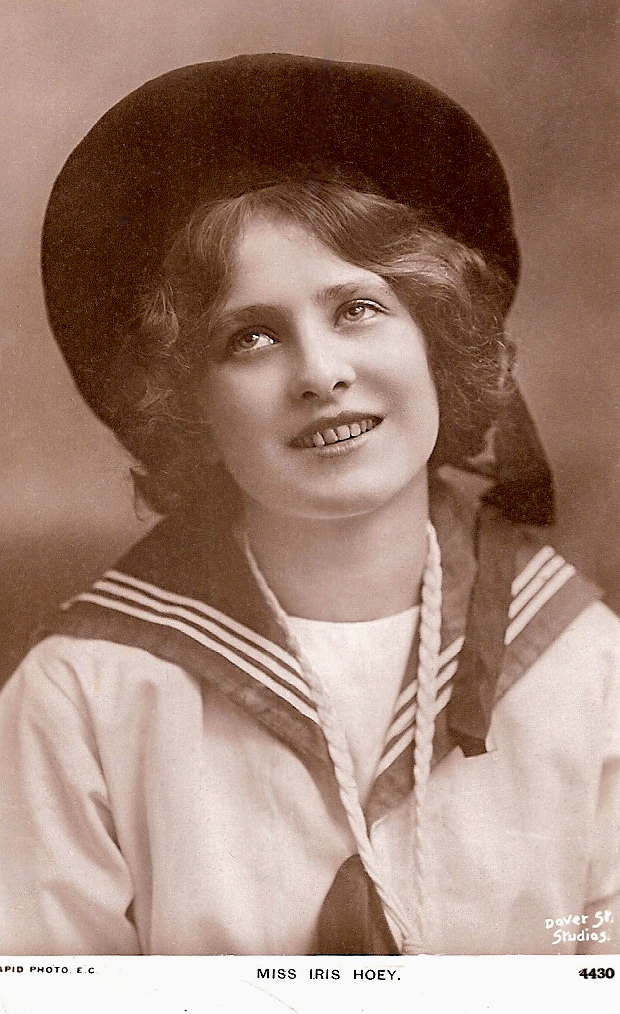
Iris Hoey as a child wearing a sailor suit

== Personal life ==
Hoey married first, in 1911, Mashiter ("Max") Leeds (1883-1937), of Spring Grove, Bishopstoke, Hampshire, grandson of Sir Joseph Edward Leeds, 2nd baronet; they had a son, Joseph Mashiter Leeds, in 1912 and divorced in 1922.

She married Cyril Raymond in 1922; on 4 December 1923, their son, John North Blagrave Raymond (1923-1977), was born in Bristol; he was a journalist and literary editor of the New Statesman.

== Filmography ==
Year	Title	Role	Notes
1922	East Lynne	Isabel Carlyle	Short
1922	Tense Moments with Great Authors	Isabel Carlyle	(segment "East Lynne")
1931	Her Reputation	Dultitia Sloane	
1934	Those Were the Days	Agatha Poskett	
1935	Royal Cavalcade	Waitress	Uncredited
1936	Living Dangerously	Lady Annesley	
1936	One in a Million	Mrs. Fenwick	
1936	A Star Fell from Heaven	Frau Heinmeyer	
1936	The Tenth Man	Lady Etchingham	
1936	The Limping Man	Mrs. Paget	
1937	Perfect Crime	Mrs. Pennypacker	
1937	Let's Make a Night of It	Laura Boydell	
1938	Jane Steps Out	Mrs. Wilton	
1938	Edgar Wallace's The Terror	Mrs. Elvery	
1938	Pygmalion	Ysabel Social Reporter	
1940	The Midas Touch	Ellie Morgan	
1940	Just William	Mrs. Brown	
1949	Poet's Pub	Lady Keith	
1950	The Girl Who Couldn't Quite	Janet	
