= She Didn't Say No! =

1958 British film by Cyril Frankel

- Directed by: Cyril Frankel
- Written by: T. J. Morrison
- Based on: We Are Seven by Una Troy
- Produced by: Sergei Nolbandov
- Starring: Eileen Herlie; Perlita Neilson; Niall MacGinnis
- Cinematography: Gilbert Taylor
- Edited by: Charles Hasse
- Music by: Tristram Cary
- Production companies: GW Films; Associated British Picture Corporation
- Distributed by: Associated British-Pathé
- Release date: 30 September 1958
- Running time: 97 minutes
- Country: United Kingdom
- Language: English

She Didn't Say No! is a 1958 British comedy film directed by Cyril Frankel and starring Eileen Herlie, Perlita Neilson and Niall MacGinnis.

== Background ==
She Didn't Say No! was written by T.J. Morrison based on the 1955 novel We Are Seven by Una Troy. Troy fictionalised the life of Moll McCarthy (1902–1940), who lived in an Irish village and had seven children by (at least) six fathers. Her lifestyle, in a deeply Catholic country where premarital sex and illegitimacy was strongly frowned on, attracted opprobrium and her cottage's thatched roof was destroyed by arson in 1926. It was claimed that she lived by bartering sexual favours for produce and services. Local judge Seán Troy (Una's father) refused two applications to have her children taken into an orphanage, persuaded that she was a good mother. She was murdered in November 1940; a relative, Henry "Harry" Gleeson, was hanged for her murder, but was pardoned in 2013. Kieran Fagan, in 2015, published The Framing of Harry Gleeson, which claimed McCarthy was murdered by local Irish Republican Army (IRA) members suspecting that she was an informant for the local Garda sergeant, Anthony Delaney. Other possible culprits mentioned by Brendan Ó Cathaoir in 2001 were the Gardaí or the father of the seventh child. Fagan's book caused controversy by naming the supposed fathers of McCarthy's children, many of them married men.

== Plot ==
In a village in County Wexford, the authorities apply for a court order to remove the unmarried Bridget Monaghan's six children, who have five different fathers. When the judge disagrees, finding them to be a happy and united family, the doctor convenes a meeting of the surviving fathers (one has died) at which, after long discussion, they agree on a plan. To remove the scandal, they will buy the Monaghans a farm over 100 miles (160 km) away.

Negotiations will be conducted by Casey, unmarried father of the eldest Monaghan boy, whom he takes to work on his own farm. The eldest Monaghan girl falls in love with a visiting painter, who wants to take her to Italy. The next Monaghan girl catches the eye of a visiting film director, who wants to take her to London. The youngest Monaghan boy wins the heart of his father's childless wife, who wants to adopt him. Two children are left when Casey is ready to move the family to their new home and, to remove scandal, he marries their mother.

== Cast ==
- Eileen Herlie as Bridget Monahan
- Perlita Neilson as Mary Monahan
- Wilfred Downing as Tommy Monahan
- Anne Dickins as Poppy Monahan
- Teri Scoble as twin #2
- Lesley Scoble as twin #1
- Raymond Manthorpe as Toughy Monahan
- Niall MacGinnis as James Casey
- Patrick McAlinney as Matthew Hogan
- Jack MacGowran as William Bates
- Joan O'Hara as Mrs. Bates
- Ray McAnally as Jim Power
- Betty McDowall as Mrs. Power
- Ian Bannen as Peter Howard
- Eithne Dunne as Miss Hogan
- Hilton Edwards as film director
- Maureen Halligan as Miss Kelly
- Harry Hutchinson as Judge
- Paul Farrell as Darmody
- Shirley Joy as Maybella Merton
- Viola Keats as Mrs. Merton
- Anna Manahan as Maggie Murphy
- Michael O'Brien as Sergeant
- Liam Redmond as Dr. Cassidy
- John Welsh as Inspector

== Production ==
The film was shot at Elstree Studios and in Cornwall, using Technicolor. The film's sets were designed by the art director William Kellner.

== Critical reception ==
The Monthly Film Bulletin wrote: "All the humour to be evoked from the subject of illegitimacy is here unmercifully bludgeoned, and a jolly musical score insists what a gay affair it all is. The direction is heavily unsubtle and the playing coyly emphatic. As an entertainment, the film is mediocre as well as mildly offensive."

British film critic Leslie Halliwell said: "Coyly daring comedy full of stage Oirishisms and obvious jokes, a few of which work."

The Irish Film Institute commented that, "The whimsical and comedic treatment given to this serious subject matter and the moral reaction of the Irish authorities to the film’s production make it an excellent prism through which to examine changing attitudes to family structures and the way unmarried mothers and their children have been treated over time."

== Banning in Ireland and later history ==
Because of its portrayal of illegitimacy, the film was not released in Ireland until a film copy was retrieved in 2001 at the Irish Film Archive. It was shown at the Museum of Modern Art in New York in 2005, as part of an international film preservation festival. Thanks to the European initiative 'A Season of Classic Films' of the Association des Cinémathèques Européennes (ACE), the film has been digitised in early 2021 and made possible to release online with an introduction on the film’s preservation and history.
