= George Hayes (English actor) =

English actor (1888–1967)

- Old Vic postcard
- Born: 13 November 1888; London, United Kingdom
- Died: 13 July 1967 (aged 78); London, United Kingdom
- Occupation: Actor
- Years active: 1913 - 1956 (film & TV)

George Hayes (13 November 1888 – 13 July 1967) was a British stage, television and film actor.

He appeared in the wartime West End musical The Lisbon Story at the London Hippodrome.

== Partial filmography ==
- Hamlet (1913) - Osric
- Emil and the Detectives (1935) - The Man In The Bowler Hat - Sam Pinker
- Inside the Room (1935) - Henry Otisse
- Old Roses (1935) - Simes
- The Guv'nor (1935) - Dubois
- Wolf's Clothing (1936) - Yassiov
- Everything Is Thunder (1936) - Minor Role (uncredited)
- Land Without Music (1936) - Strozzi
- Death Croons the Blues (1937) - Hugo Branker
- Break the News (1938) - President of the Tribunal
- Strange Boarders (1938) - (uncredited)
- No Parking (1938) - James Selby
- The Return of the Frog (1938) - Dandy Lane
- Life of St. Paul (1938) - Nero
- The Mind of Mr. Reeder (1939) - Brady
- Secret Journey (1939) - Insp. Walter
- Come On George! (1939) - Bannerman
- Spy for a Day (1940) - Cpl. Boehme
- The Case of the Frightened Lady (1940) - Brooks
- Freedom Radio (1941) - Policeman
- East of Piccadilly (1941) - Mark Struberg
- Great Expectations (1946) - Convict
- Esther Waters (1948) - Journeyman
- For Them That Trespass (1949) - The Mad Artist

== Bibliography ==
- Goble, Alan. The Complete Index to Literary Sources in Film. Walter de Gruyter, 1999.
