= The Guv'nor (film) =

1935 film

- Opening credit screen
- Directed by: Milton Rosmer
- Written by: Guy Bolton; Maude T. Howell
- Based on: a story by Paul Lafitte
- Produced by: Michael Balcon
- Starring: George Arliss; Gene Gerrard; Viola Keats
- Cinematography: Mutz Greenbaum
- Edited by: Charles Saunders
- Music by: Arthur Benjamin; Louis Levy
- Production company: Gaumont British
- Distributed by: Gaumont British
- Release date: 1 October 1935 (UK)
- Running time: 80 minutes
- Country: United Kingdom
- Language: English

The Guv'nor is a 1935 British comedy film starring George Arliss, Gene Gerrard and Viola Keats, and directed by Milton Rosmer. Arliss in the title role is a tramp who rides a series of misunderstandings and becomes the president of a bank. It was a remake of the 1934 French film Rothchild. The film was re-released in England in 1944 and 1949. It was released in the US as Mr. Hobo.

It was shot at the Lime Grove Studios in Shepherd's Bush. The film's sets were designed by the art director Alfred Junge.

== Plot ==
Monsieur Barsac is in a great deal of trouble - the Paris bank of which he is president is bankrupt, though nobody else knows yet. He tells his secret to his crony Dubois, since he needs his help. Dubois is to purchase an iron mine that is supposedly played out. However, Barsac's mining engineer has found rich, untapped deposits of ore. The mine is 51% owned by the widow Mrs. Granville and her daughter Madeleine, who are deeply in debt to his bank. Barsac uses his stepson Paul as an intermediary since Paul is a friend of the family, particularly the beautiful Madeleine.

Meanwhile, a vagabond known as the "Guv'nor" decides to head south for the winter with his friend Flit. At the Granville estate, he offers to mend some china in exchange for food and is treated very cordially by Madeleine.

Soon after, the two men are taken into custody for poaching and returned to Paris. After the policeman learns the Guv'nor's unusual real name, François Rothschild, he informs a member of the great banking dynasty who, unwilling to have their illustrious family name besmirched by an arrest, gives the Guv'nor a check for 2000 francs and has the two men released.

The Guv'nor is happy with his lifestyle, so he offers the money to Flit. They clean themselves up before trying to cash the check at Barzac's bank. Barzac mistakes the Guv'nor for one of the Rothschilds and tries to persuade him to join the board of directors to prop up the bank. During the conversation, the Guv'nor catches Barzac in a lie about Madeleine and becomes interested. He is made president of the bank.

When the Guv'nor learns details about Barsac's scheme from Madame Barzac, who is anxious to prevent her husband from investing in a "worthless" mine, he returns to the Granville estate. There, dressed as the tramp, he advises Madeleine to get Paul to ask for impartial advice about Barzac's strong recommendation to sell - from Monsieur Rothschild. Instead, she goes to see Rothschild herself and discovers his real identity. She believes that he has deceived her so he can purchase the mine himself and stalks out before he can explain. The next morning, the Guv'nor attends a meeting of the shareholders called to vote on whether to sell for the pittance Dubois is offering. The Guv'nor denounces Barzac and Dubois, but Madeleine votes to sell.

The wily Guv'nor then makes it look as if he has committed suicide. People fear he did so because there is something wrong with the bank and Dubois' company; panic selling soon drives down the price of shares in both. Meanwhile, Paul buys them on the Guv'nor's behalf. Having saved the Granvilles and ruined Barzac and Dubois, the Guv'nor gives the shares to Madeleine and Paul as a wedding present and resumes his carefree journey to warmer climes.

== Partial cast ==
- George Arliss as François Rothschild, the "Guv'nor"
- Gene Gerrard as Flit
- Viola Keats as Madelaine Granville
- Patric Knowles as Paul
- Frank Cellier as Barsac
- George Hayes as Dubois
- Mary Clare as Madame Barsac
- Henrietta Watson as Mrs. Granville
- Mignon O'Doherty as Margot

== Production ==
The film was made as part of a three picture deal between Arliss and Gaumont British.

== Critical reception ==
Writing for The Spectator in 1936, Graham Greene gave the film a middling review, noting that although he was not an admirer of George Arliss, he found this film "rather more tolerable than his recent appearances". Greene spoke favorably about the hint of satire concerning the last name (Rothschild) of the tramp played by Arliss, and speculated that the film might have been improved if it had been directed by René Clair.

Frank Nugent wrote in The New York Times, "George Arliss, fresh as any septuagenarian can be from his personal triumphs as Disraeli, Richelieu, Wellington and Hamilton, becomes a completely non-historical tramp in "Mister Hobo," the new Gaumont-British film which opened yesterday at the Roxy. An unpretentious little picture, happily devoid of international crises and court intrigues, it is gently humorous, quietly paced and a rather pleasant breathing spell for Mr. Arliss and his admirers."

Variety wrote that it is a "fair picture [and] technically competent", but commented that the plot is "indubitably slow." They expressed the opinion that its success would depend on the popularity of Arliss who demonstrated his "artistry" in his performance.

More recently, Hal Erickson in Allmovie called it "a standard George Arliss vehicle, despite his rags and tatters"; and TV Guide wrote, "though the situation is contrived, the script is quite good and completely believable. It's all helped by a terrific ensemble effort from the cast, handled with grace and style. It's a smoothly directed, witty little piece."
