= Peter Cellier =

English retired actor (born 1928)

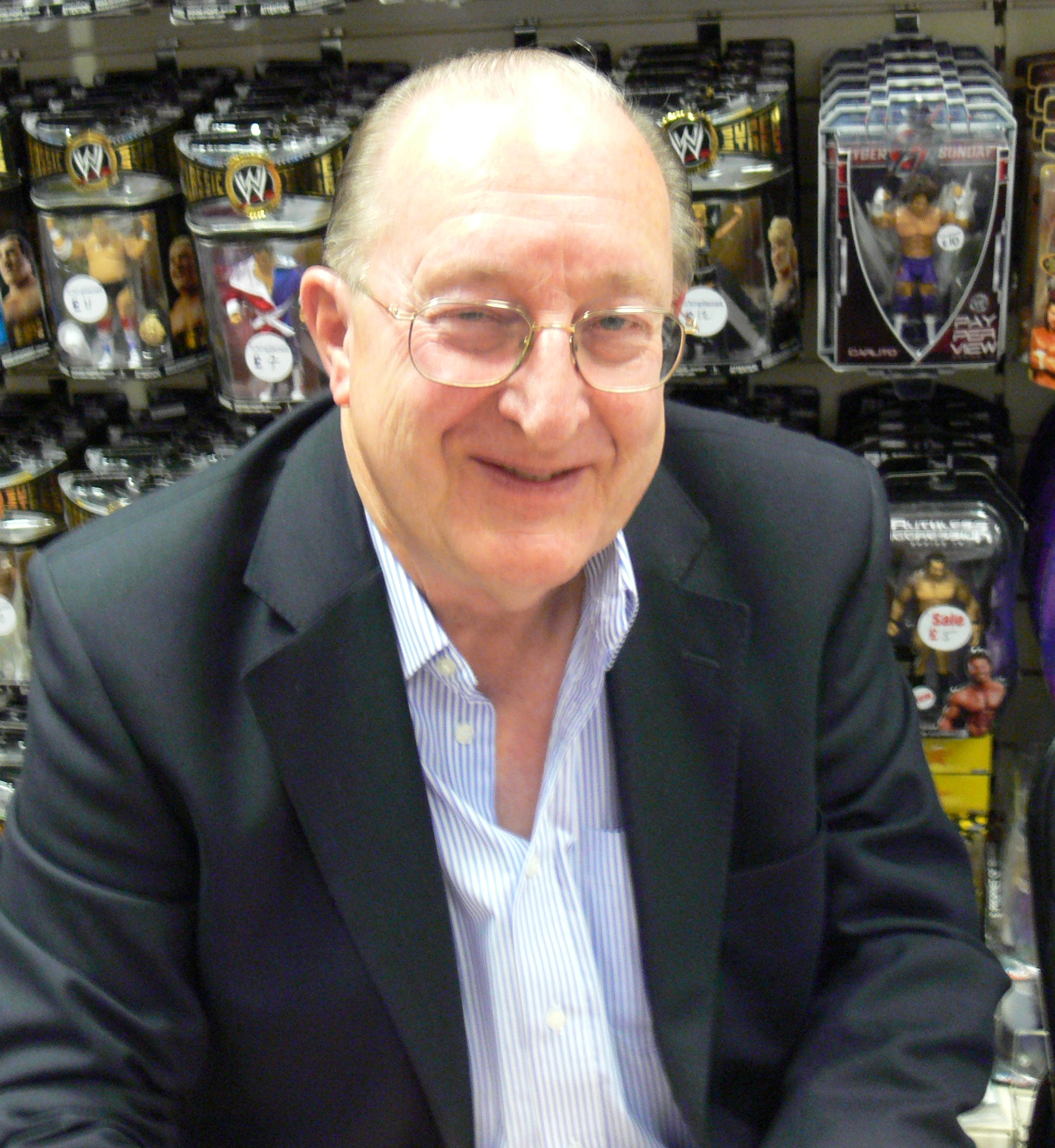
- Cellier in 2007
- Born: 12 July 1928 (age 98); Hendon, Middlesex, England
- Occupation: Actor
- Years active: 1953–2011
- Spouse: Nonie Pashley (m. 1950; died 2016)
- Children: 2
- Parents: Frank Cellier (father); Phyllis Shannaw (mother)
- Relatives: François Cellier (grandfather); Antoinette Cellier (half-sister); Alfred Cellier (great uncle)

Peter François Cellier (born 12 July 1928) is an English retired actor who has appeared on film, stage and television. He is known for his role as Sir Frank Gordon in Yes Minister and Yes, Prime Minister in the 1980s as well as for his appearances as the Major in Keeping Up Appearances in the early 1990s.

== Early life ==
Cellier was born on 12 July 1928, in Hendon, Middlesex, into a family of actors including his father Frank, his mother Phyllis Shannaw and his half-sister Antoinette. His grandfather was the Gilbert and Sullivan conductor François Cellier.

== Career ==
=== Theatre ===
Cellier started his career at the Leatherhead Theatre in 1953. His theatre work has included seasons at Stratford-on-Avon, The Old Vic and the Chichester Festival Theatre, and he was a founder-member of the National Theatre. Shakespeare plays in which Cellier has appeared include Hamlet, The Merchant of Venice, Othello, Love's Labour's Lost, Measure for Measure, As You Like It, King John, Julius Caesar, Cymbeline and Henry V, as the Dauphin. Other roles include Pinchard in Georges Feydeau's An Absolute Turkey, Tommy Devon in Aunt Edwina, The Dean of Archeo in Body and Soul, Eric Shelding in The Case in Question, Danforth in The Crucible, Duke Francis in The Dark Horse, Dr Finache in Jacques Charon's National Theatre production of Feydeau's A Flea in her Ear, Charles Blutham in Juno and the Paycock, Dr Herdal in The Master Builder, Sir John Tremaine in Me And My Girl, The Chaplain in Mother Courage, Christopher in A Private Matter, Captain Brazen in The Recruiting Officer (replacing Laurence Olivier), Polonius in Rosencrantz and Guildenstern Are Dead Higgins in Ross, Miguel Estete in The Royal Hunt of the Sun and Desmond in The Winslow Boy.

=== Television ===
On television, Cellier has appeared in a wide range of programmes since 1955, including detective series such as Softly, Softly and Bergerac, adventure series such as Doctor Who, historical dramas such as The Six Wives of Henry VIII, Upstairs, Downstairs and The Duchess of Duke Street. He made appearances on the John Mortimer written series Rumpole of the Bailey (two guest roles, the second as a defence department official in "Rumpole and the Official Secret") and Paradise Postponed (three episodes as solicitor Mr Rattling). He also appeared in the sitcoms It Ain't Half Hot Mum, Yes Minister and its sequel Yes, Prime Minister (1981–87) and Keeping Up Appearances, as Major Wilton-Smythe (1990–91), among others. In the two Minister series, he played Sir Frank Gordon, the Permanent Secretary to HM Treasury, urbanely contending with Nigel Hawthorne's Sir Humphrey Appleby for supremacy within the civil service. He played Andrews in the 1982 serial Time-Flight, Roy Difford in the Casualty episode "The Silence of Friends" and the judge in BBC Four's Canoe Man (2010), which recounted the John Darwin disappearance case.

=== Films ===
Cellier's film work includes Morgan! (1966), as Second Counsel; Young Winston (1972), as Captain 35th Sikhs; Luther (1974), as the Prior; Don't Just Lie There, Say Something! (1973), as the Attorney General; Man About the House (1974), as Morris Pluthero; Man Friday (1975), as Carey; Barry Lyndon (1975), as Sir Richard; Sister Dora (1977), as Actor; Jabberwocky (1977), as First merchant; Crossed Swords (1977), as Mean Man; Holocaust 2000 (1977), as Sheckley; The Pumaman (1980), as Martin; Breaking Glass (1980), as Garage Customer; Chariots of Fire (1981), as the head waiter at The Savoy; And the Ship Sails On (1983), as Sir Reginald J. Dongby; The Last Days of Pompeii (1984), as Calenus; A Room with a View (1985), as Sir Harry Otway, a landlord; Clockwise (1986), as Headmaster; Out of Order (1987), as Home Secretary; Personal Services (1987), as Mr Marples; Howards End (1992), as Colonel Fussell; Bhaji on the Beach (1993), as Ambrose Waddington; The Remains of the Day (1993), as Sir Leonard Bax; Stanley's Dragon (1994), as Mr Johnson; Mrs Dalloway (1997), as Lord Lezham, and Ladies in Lavender (2004), as BBC Announcer.

Cellier played W. S. Gilbert in the 1983 film The Best of Gilbert and Sullivan, in which Gilbert and Sullivan reunite to watch a performance of their greatest songs at the Royal Albert Hall.

== Personal life ==
Cellier married Nonie Pashley in 1950 and was widowed on 4 April 2016.

== Filmography ==
Year	Title	Role	Notes
1960	Sink the Bismarck!	First Lieutenant on Destroyers	Uncredited
1966	Morgan – A Suitable Case for Treatment	Second Counsel	
1972	Young Winston	Captain	
1973	Scotch on the Rocks	Graham Hart	
1974	Luther	Prior	
1974	Don't Just Lie There, Say Something!	Attorney General	
1974	Man About the House	Morris Pluthero	
1975	Slade in Flame	Salesman In Car Showroom	Uncredited
1975	Man Friday	Carey	
1975	Barry Lyndon	Sir Richard	
1977	Jabberwocky	1st Merchant	
1977	The Prince and the Pauper	Mean Man	
1977	Holocaust 2000	Sheckley	
1980	The Pumaman	Museum Curator	
1980	Breaking Glass	Garage Customer	
1981	Chariots of Fire	Head Waiter–Savoy	
1983	And the Ship Sails On	Sir Reginald J. Dongby	
1985	A Room with a View	Sir Harry Otway, a landlord	
1986	Clockwise	Headmaster #4	
1987	Personal Services	Mr Marples	
1987	Out of Order	Home Secretary	
1992	Howards End	Colonel Fussell	
1993	Bhaji on the Beach	Ambrose Waddington	
1993	The Remains of the Day	Sir Leonard Bax	
1994	Stanley's Dragon	Mr Johnson	
1997	Mrs Dalloway	Lord Lezham	
2004	Ladies in Lavender	BBC Announcer	

== Television ==
Year	Title	Role	Notes
1955–1956	BBC Sunday Night Theatre	De Gringon/Sarcastic Bystander	2 episodes
1959	ITV Play of the Week	Nugent Darbey/Lt. Peter Ford	2 episodes
1962	BBC Sunday-Night Play	Dr. Arden	Episode: "The Big Eat"
1962–1963	ITV Television Playhouse	Brian/Clifford Marvel	2 episodes
1969	BBC Play of the Month	Lord Burleigh	Episode: "Mary, Queen of Scots"
1969	Softly, Softly	Stanley Mellish	Episode: "A Quality of Gelignite"
1969	Callan	Captain Jenkins	Episode: "Heir Apparent"
1969	The Gold Robbers	Slade	Episode: "Dog Eat Dog"
1969	Public Eye	Enright	2 episodes
1969	Thirty-Minute Theatre	Frazer Douglas	Episode: "A Formula for Treason"
1969	ITV Playhouse	Arnold	Episode: "The Swan Won't Go in the Fridge"
1970	The Six Wives of Henry VIII	Sir Christopher Hales	Episode: "Anne Boleyn"
1970	Randall and Hopkirk (Deceased)	Long	Episode: "The Ghost Talks"
1970	ITV Sunday Night Theatre	Major Gerald Hissock	Episode: "Lay Down Your Arms"
1971	Shadows of Fear	Peter	Episode: "Repent at Leisure"
1971	The Rivals of Sherlock Holmes	Lord Wiltshire	Episode: "The Duchess of Wiltshire's Diamonds"
1972–1973	The Protectors	Auctioneer/Jones	2 episodes
1972–1975	Play for Today	Various	3 episodes, including Leeds United!
1973	Thriller	Colonel Wright	Episode: "Someone at the Top of the Stairs"
1973	Orson Welles Great Mysteries	Harold Irving	Episode: "The Dinner Party"
1973	Upstairs, Downstairs	Henry Pritchett	Episode: "Word of Honour"
1974	Special Branch	Sir Terence Gabon	Episode: "Alien"
1974–1977	Warship	Captain Calder	2 episodes
1976	BBC2 Playhouse	Claude	Episode: "A Martyr to the System"
1976	The Duchess of Duke Street	Mr. Mather	Episode: "The Bargain"
1976	The New Avengers	Carter	Episode: "Gnaws"
1977–1982	Crown Court	Judge Robinson	2 serials
1978	The Professionals	Walton	Episode: "Long Shot"
1978	Pennies from Heaven	Bank Manager	Episode: "The Sweetest Thing"
1979	Danger UXB	Flt. Lt. Fenwick	Episode: "Seventeen Seconds to Glory
1979–1987	Rumpole of the Bailey	Sir Frank Fawcett/Mr. Grayson	2 episodes
1980	Armchair Thriller	Maitland	Episode: "Fear of God Part 3: The Music Room"
1980	Tales of the Unexpected	Wilkins	Episode: "Depart in Peace"
1980	It Ain't Half Hot Mum	Major Grant Hopkirk	Episode: "That's Entertainment?"
1981	Yes Minister	Sir Frank Gordon	Episode: "The Quality of Life"
1982	Doctor Who	Jim Andrews	Serial: Time-Flight
1982	Q.E.D.	MI5 Man	Episode: "The Limehouse Connection"
1984	Up the Elephant and Round the Castle	Rupert	Episode: "Every Two Minutes"
1984	The Last Days of Pompeii	Calenus	Miniseries
1986–1987	Yes Prime Minister	Sir Frank Gordon	4 episodes
1986	Sorry!	Mr. Endicott	Episode: "Natural Wastage"
1988	Don't Wait Up	Patient Richard Balfour	Episode: "Golf"
1990–1991	Keeping Up Appearances	The Major	3 episodes
1993	Goodnight Sweetheart	The Spiv	Episode: "Is Your Journey Really Necessary?"
1996	Our Friends in the North	Judge	Episode: "1987"
1996	The Willows in Winter	Prendergast (voice)	TV movie
1997	Ain't Misbehavin'	George Nightingale	2 episodes (mini-series)
2003	Midsomer Murders	Peregrine Slade	Episode: "A Talent for Life"
2005–2010	Doctors	David Padkin/Stanley Hill	2 episodes
2007	Casualty	Roy Difford	Episode: "The Silence of Friends"
