= Her Last Affaire =

- Feature on the film from Picture Show (30 May 1936)
- Directed by: Michael Powell
- Written by: Ian Dalrymple
- Based on: S.O.S. (play) by Walter Ellis
- Produced by: Simon Rowson; Geoffrey Rowson
- Starring: Hugh Williams; Viola Keats
- Cinematography: Geoffrey Faithfull; Leslie Rowson
- Edited by: Ian Dalrymple
- Distributed by: Producers Distributing Corporation
- Release date: 21 October 1935 (UK)
- Running time: 78 minutes
- Country: United Kingdom
- Language: English

Her Last Affaire is a 1935 British drama film directed by Michael Powell and starring Hugh Williams, Viola Keats, Cecil Parker and Googie Withers. It was written by Ian Dalrymple based on the play S.O.S. by Walter Ellis.

== Plot ==
Alan Herriot is the secretary to prominent politician Sir Julian Weyre, and seeks to clear the name of his deceased father, who was unjustly imprisoned. Thinking that Sir Julian's wife Avril has relevant information, Alan takes her to hotel, on the pretext of a furtive affaire. When he forces Avril to write a confession, she dies from a heart attack. Alan panics, thinking he will be thought a murderer, because an "SOS" on the wireless states that a bottle of medicine Avril recently purchased in fact contains poison. His alibi lies in Avril's confession, which he has lost, but it is discovered, just in time, by a servant.

== Cast ==
- Hugh Williams as Alan Herriot
- Viola Keats as Lady Avril Weyre
- Francis L. Sullivan as Sir Julian Weyre
- Sophie Stewart as Judy Weyre
- Felix Aylmer as Lord Carnforth
- Cecil Parker as Sir Arthur Harding
- John Gardner as Boxall
- Henry Caine as Inspector Marsh
- Gerrard Tyrell as Martin
- John Laurie as Robb
- Googie Withers as Effie

== Reception ==
The Monthly Film Bulletin wrote: "'This is a social comedy on a very old theme. ... The story is not redeemed by any outstanding performances by the actors and the attempts to reveal the characters' thoughts by flashes-back are confusing rather than helpful."

The Daily Film Renter wrote: "Ingenious plot proves quite engrossing, despite overplus of dialogue, and occasional moments when action drags. Attractive backgrounds of London and New Forest. Competent work by good all-round cast, in which John Laurie and Googie Withers stand out as religious innkeeper and servant girl respectively. Leading players err, if anything, on side of restraint."

Variety wrote: "Picture is better than the play, but the celluloid unwinding is a trifle too involved for the majority of filmgoers. It will be well liked and much appreciated in the better class picture houses. Director sets the piece in exactly the right key, has produced it tastefully and most of the details contribute to the good effect. It is atmospheric throughout."
