= James Bridie =

Scottish playwright, screenwriter and physician (1888–1951)

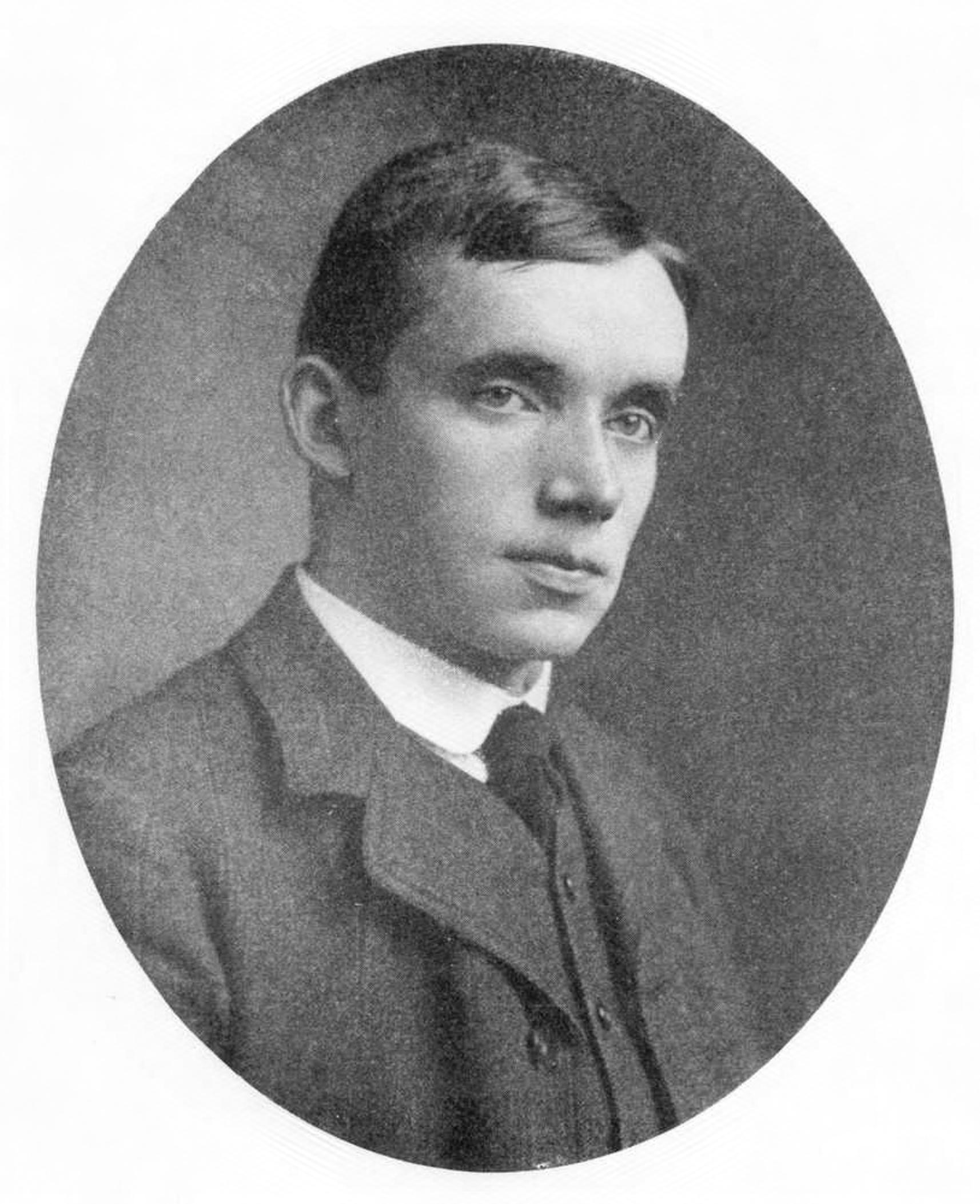
James Bridie

James Bridie (3 January 1888 in Glasgow – 29 January 1951 in Edinburgh) was the pseudonym of Scottish playwright, screenwriter and physician whose real name was Osborne Henry Mavor. He took his pen-name from his paternal grandfather's first name and his grandmother's maiden name.

== Biography ==
=== Early life ===
Bridie was the son of Henry Alexander Mavor (1858–1915), an electrical engineer and industrialist, and his wife Janet Osborne. He went to school at Glasgow Academy and then studied medicine at the University of Glasgow graduating in 1913, later becoming a general practitioner, then consultant physician and professor after serving as a military physician during World War I, seeing service in France and Mesopotamia.

=== Career as playwright and screenwriter ===
He came to prominence with his comic play The Anatomist (1931), about the grave robbers Burke and Hare. This and other comedic plays saw success in London, and he became a full-time writer in 1938. He returned to the army during World War II, again serving as a physician.

In 1923, he married Rona Locke Bremner (1897–1985). Their son was killed in World War II. His other son Ronald (1925–2007) was also both a physician and playwright. Ronald became drama critic of The Scotsman after retiring from medicine, Director of the Scottish Arts Council and Deputy Chairman of the Edinburgh Festival. He was Professor of Drama and Head of the Drama Department at the University of Saskatchewan and was appointed C.B.E.

Bridie died in Edinburgh of a stroke and is buried in Glasgow Western Necropolis. The Bridie Library at the Glasgow University Union is named after him, as is the annual Bridie Dinner that takes place in the Union each December.

== Contribution to drama and the arts ==
Bridie was the founder of the Citizens Theatre in Glasgow, in association with joint founders art director Dr Tom Honeyman and cinema magnate George Singleton, who also created the Cosmo, predecessor of today's Glasgow Film Theatre. Many of his plays were staged at the Citizens Theatre between 1943 and 1960. Tony Paterson has argued that Bridie's output set the tone for Scottish Theatre until the early Nineteen-Sixties and gave encouragement to other Scottish dramatists such as Robert Kemp, Alexander Reid and George Munro. Alan Riach described (in 2021) Bridie's plays as both serious and offering 'high spirited fun'; both contemporarily 'commercially successful' and yet 'perennially provocative'; raising open questions that Riach considers as Brechtian. He admires the quality of writing in Bridie's 1939 autobiography One Way of Living, calling it a 'modern classic'.

In 1946, Bridie proposed a Scottish Theatre Festival in Perth, with Scottish theatres coming together to make the town a Scottish Salsburg. He was the first chairman of the Arts Council in Scotland and was also instrumental in the establishment of the Edinburgh Festival. In 1950 he founded the Glasgow College of Dramatic Art, part of the Royal Conservatoire today.

Bridie worked with the director Alfred Hitchcock in the late 1940s. They worked together on:

- The Paradine Case (1947). Bridie originally wrote the screenplay, and Ben Hecht contributed some additional dialogue. But due to casting, the characters had to be changed. So David O. Selznick had to write another script.
- Under Capricorn (1949)
- Stage Fright (1950)

== Bibliography ==
- Some Talk of Alexander (1926), book, his experiences as an army doctor
- The Sunlight Sonata or To Meet the Seven Deadly Sins (1928), assisted by John Brandane and published under the pseudonym Mary Henderson, directed by Tyrone Guthrie
- The Switchback (1929), with James Brandane
- What It Is to Be Young (1929)
- The Girl Who Did Not Want to Go to Kuala Lumpur (1930)
- The Pardoner's Tale (1930)
- Tobias and the Angel (1930)
- The Amazed Evangelist (1931)
- The Anatomist (1931) (dramatisation of the historical Burke and Hare murders)
- The Dancing Bear (1931)
- Jonah and the Whale (1932)
- A Sleeping Clergyman (1933)
- Marriage Is No Joke (1934)
- Colonel Witherspoon or The Fourth Way of Greatness (1934)
- Mary Read (with Claude Gurney) (1934)
- The Tragic Muse (1934)
- The Black Eye (1935)
- Storm in a Teacup (Adaptation) (1936) Based on Bruno Frank's Sturm im Wasserglas
- Susannah and the Elders (1937)
- The King of Nowhere (1938)
- Babes in the Wood (1938)
- The Last Trump (1938)
- The Kitchen Comedy Radio play, (1938)
- The Letter Box Rattles (1938)
- One Way of Living (1939) – Autobiography
- What Say They? (1939)
- The Sign of the Prophet Jonah Radio play (1942) Adaption of Jonah and the Whale
- The Dragon and the Dove or How the Hermit Abraham Fought the Devil for His Niece (1943)
- Jonah 3 (1942) Revised version of Jonah and the Whale
- Holy Isle (1942)
- A Change for the Worse 1943
- Mr. Bolfry 1943
- Tedious and Brief (1944)
- Lancelot 1945
- Paradise Enow 1945
- The Pyrate's Den (1946) unpublished, written under the pseudonym Archibald P. Kellock
- Gog and Magog 1948
- It Depends What You Mean 1949
- The Forrigan Reel Ballad opera 1949
- Dr. Angelus 1949
- John Knox 1949
- Daphne Laureola 1949
- The Golden Legend of Shults 1949 - (adapted to There Was a Crooked Man (film) by Norman Wisdom
- Mr. Gillie 1950
- The Queen's Comedy 1950
- Folly to be Wise 1952
- The Baikie Charivari or The Seven Prophets 1953
- Meeting at Night (With Archibald Batty) 1954
- (Adaptation) The Wild Duck. Based on Vildanden by Henrik Ibsen
- (Adaptation) Liliom Based on Ferenc Molnár's play of the same name
- (Adaptation) Hedda Gabler by Henrik Ibsen
- (Adaptation) The Misanthrope Based on Le Misanthrope by Molière
