= Phyllis Shannaw =

English actress (1901–1988)

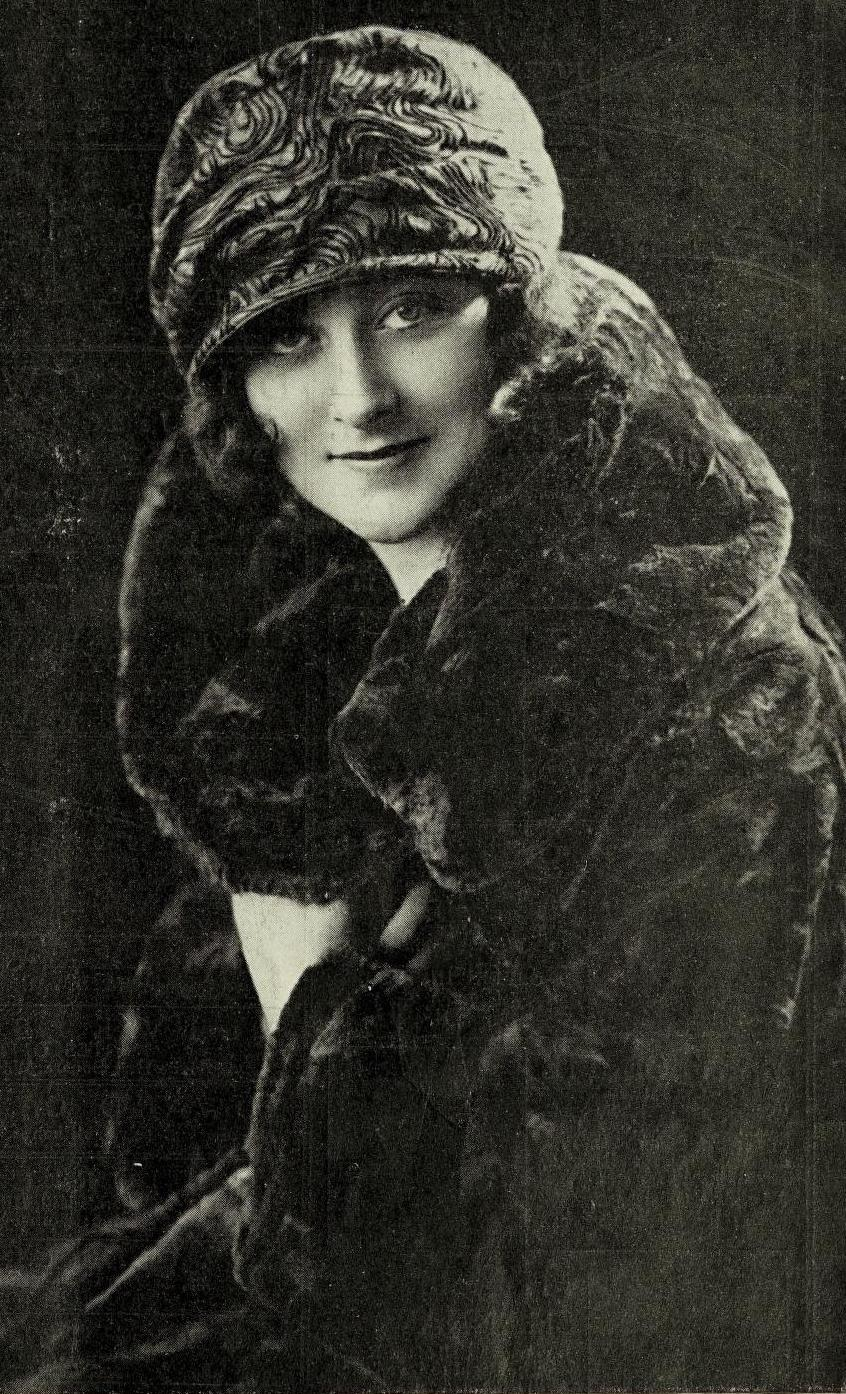
- Shannaw, from a 1921 publication
- Born: Phyllis Maud Shannaw; 3 May 1901; Richmond, Surrey, England
- Died: 11 June 1988 (aged 87); Surrey, England
- Occupation: Actress
- Years active: 1920s
- Known for: Silent films
- Spouse: Frank Cellier (m. 1925; died 1948)
- Children: Peter Cellier

Phyllis Shannaw (3 May 1901 – 11 June 1988) was an English actress in silent films and the London stage. Her husband Frank Cellier was also an actor, as is her son, Peter Cellier.

== Early life ==
Phyllis Maud Shannaw was born in Richmond, Surrey. She was educated at Wentworth Hall in Mill Hill.

== Career ==
Shannaw was in musical comedies and revues as a young woman. She appeared in five silent films: The Call of the Road (1920), The River of Light (1921), The Right to Live (1921), The Fifth Form at St. Dominic's (1921), and The Sport of Kings (1921). Her stage credits included London productions of The Limpet (1922), The Merry Wives of Windsor (1923-1924), The Mask and the Face (1924), and The Torch Bearers (1925). Shannaw "showed that, in addition to being able to act, she has a voice that is beautiful, quiet, dignified, and expressive," according to a theatre reviewer in 1922.

== Personal life ==
In 1925, Phyllis Shannaw became the second wife of Frank Cellier, son of conductor François Cellier and father of actress Antoinette Cellier. They had a son, Peter Cellier, who also became an actor. Frank Cellier died in 1948. She died on 11 June 1988, in Surrey, aged 87.
