= Una Troy =

Irish novelist (1910–1993)

- Born: 21 May 1910 (some sources give 1913); Fermoy, County Cork, Ireland
- Died: 17 September 1993 (aged 83); Bonmahon, Ireland
- Other name: Una Troy Walsh
- Occupations: Novelist and playwright
- Spouse: Joseph C. Walsh (m. 1931)
- Relatives: Seán Keating (brother-in-law)

Una Troy Walsh (21 May 1910 – 27 September 1993) was an Irish novelist and playwright who wrote under the names Elizabeth Connor and Una Troy.

== Early life ==
Troy was born in Fermoy, County Cork, the daughter of John S. Troy and Brigid Agnes Hayes. Her father was a lawyer and a judge. Her sister Gráinne (or Grania, 1913–1970) was a musician, and her sister Shevaun (1923–1993) was a poet. She was educated at the Loreto Convent in Rathfarnham, Dublin.

== Career ==
=== Before and during World War II ===
Writing under the pen name of "Elizabeth Connor", she began her career in 1936 with the publication of the novel Mount Prospect, which was banned in the Irish Free State. Adapted as a play, it garnered the Shaw Prize for new playwrights and was performed on the Abbey stage in 1940. Two subsequent plays by Troy Swans and Geese and An Apple a Day, were also performed at the Abbey in the early 1940s.

In 1938, Dead Star's Light was published. The protagonist, John Davern, was based on the character of IRA revolutionary idealist George Lennon of West Waterford. While not banned, it did elicit censure from Troy's parish priest in Clonmel. Dead Star's Light was performed on the Abbey stage in 1947 as The Dark Road.

=== After World War II ===
In the post-World War II period Troy wrote more fifteen novels, under her own name. Miss Maggie and the Doctor (1958) was considered "as Irish as the shamrock" with "a unique exuberance and charm". Kirkus Reviews described her 1959 novel The Other End of the Bridge as "Funny in its presentation but not in its intent," adding that Troy "points up universal problems in microcosm, and stirs its Irish stew with a sturdy ladle."

Troy's 1955 novel, We Are Seven, was adapted as a film, She Didn't Say No! (1958), for which she was the co-writer. Because of its portrayal of illegitimacy, the film was not released in Ireland until a film copy was retrieved in 2001 at the Irish Film Archive. It was shown at the Museum of Modern Art in New York in 2005, as part of an international film preservation festival. Thanks to the European initiative 'A Season of Classic Films' of the Association des Cinémathèques Européennes (ACE), the film has been digitised in early 2021 and made possible to release online with an introduction on the film’s preservation and history.

== Selected publications ==
- Mount Prospect (also known as No House of Peace, 1936)
- Dead Star's Light (1938)
- We Are Seven (1955)
- Miss Maggie and the Doctor (also known as Maggie, 1958)
- The Workhouse Graces (also known as The Graces of Ballykeen, 1959)
- The Other End of the Bridge (1960)
- Esmond (1962)
- The Brimstone Halo (also known as The Prodigal Father, 1965)
- The Benefactors (1969)
- The Castle Nobody Wanted (1970)
- Tiger Puss (1970)
- Doctor Go Home (1973)
- Out of Everywhere (1976)
- Caught in the Furze (1977)
- A Sack of Gold (1979)
- So True a Fool (1981)

== Personal life ==
In 1931, Una Troy married Joseph C. Walsh of Bonmahon, who served as physician to the Irish Republican Army (IRA), and later as a coroner. Her sister-in-law May Walsh was married to Irish artist Seán Keating. The couple lived in Clonmel for most of their lives together, and had a daughter, Janet (1932–2002). Una Troy was widowed when Dr. Walsh died in 1969, and she died in 1993 in Bonmahon, County Waterford. Many of her papers are in the collection of the National Library of Ireland.
