= Stanley's Dragon =

1994 British fantasy miniseries

- Written by: Richard Carpenter
- Directed by: Gerry Poulson
- Starring: Judd Trichter; Mia Fothergill
- Music by: Dave Bainbridge
- Country of origin: United Kingdom
- Original language: English
- No. of series: 1
- No. of episodes: 4

Production
- Executive producers: Lewis Rudd; Paul Knight; Richard Carpenter
- Producer: Gerry Poulson
- Cinematography: Nigel Walters
- Running time: 92 min
- Production companies: Gatearn; Central Independent Television
- Budget: £1,000,000

Original release
- Network: ITV (CITV)
- Release: 7 April – 28 April 1994

Stanley's Dragon is a 1994's British family fantasy TV miniseries on CITV starring Judd Trichter and Mia Fothergill. It received a BAFTA TV Award nomination for Best Children's Programme.

== Plot ==
The film takes place in present-day England. Stanley is an American exchange student who, upon becoming separated from his friends in a cavern, finds an unusual rock. He and his friend Rosie take it home and wash it, discovering it is actually an egg. Rosie suspects it is a dinosaur egg, but when it hatches, they discover the creature inside is actually a dragon. The dragon grows quickly and they name him "Olly". However, Olly is appropriated by the local authorities, who put him in a zoo. Suspecting Olly may be the last of his kind, Stanley endeavours to free him.

== Cast ==
- Judd Trichter as Stanley Katz
- Mia Fothergill as Rosie Bennett
- Milton Johns as Mr. Batley
- Paul Venables as Henry Driver
- Jeremy Nicholas as Mr. Fuller
- Carol MacReady as Mrs. Batley
- Peter Cellier as Mr. Johnson
- David Roper as Inspector Walsh
- David Ellison as Sgt. Appleyard
- Jeremy Colton as Jack
- John Horsley as Mr. Little
- Julian Pettifer as Dragon Watch presenter

== Production ==
Stanley's Dragon was written by Richard Carpenter and directed by Gerry Poulson, with Dave Bainbridge composing the score. Bob Keen handled make-up. Nigel Walters served as the director of photography. Sarah Franzl handled stunt driving for the series.

The show was commissioned by Dawn Airey and was based on the Stanley's Dragon series of books also by Carpenter. All funding for the show came from the UK. It had a production budget of £1,000,000.

Filming took place in Nottingham, at the Birmingham Botanical Gardens, at the Twycross Zoo, and at Black Rocks. Three different dragon constructs were used, one of which was thirty-two feet in length and capable of emitting fire. It also had an articulated head and face. The initial constructs did not appear close enough to a real animal for Carpenter's vision. A crew of twenty-five built the constructs over the course of twelve weeks.

During the filming at Black Rocks, Fothergill slipped while climbing, tearing ligaments, requiring a visit to hospital. She spent the remainder of the day on crutches, and had to be carried to her position for the scenes where she and Trichter blocked the path to the dragon.

Filming completed in late 1993.

A theatrical film sequel had been planned, to be produced through the United States, with a budget limited to £5,000,000. The story was expected to continue from Olly's escape from the UK and take place in New York City.

== Release ==
Stanley's Dragon aired on ITV beginning on 7 April 1994.

Prior to airing in the UK, ITV signed a distribution rights agreement with Satellit-Film of Munich, giving them theatrical and video distribution rights, as well as securing televised rights in Germany for ZDF.

The show was included as part of the buyer's market at the 1994 Cannes Film Festival by CTE. Rick Mischel of Live Entertainment purchased the home video rights for North America. The show received a G rating from the MPAA.

In the United States, it aired as a film on the Disney Channel on 11 November 1995. Family Home Entertainment released the series on VHS 8 October 1996.

== Reception ==
=== Critical reviews ===
David Rafer of TV Zone praised the pacing as well as Trichter's enthusiasm for the role. Rafer stated that the production value was good overall despite being low budget, though he noted the mechanics used to make the wings fly appeared sub-standard. He also commented that the ending is ambiguous. Rafer also made note of the theme of exploitation.

John Stanley rated the show two and a half stars and called it a pleasant "morality tale about man's penchant for destruction". He also stated the show has similarities to Dragonworld.

=== Accolades ===
It was nominated for the British Academy Television Award for Best Children's Programme - Fiction or Entertainment.

== Sources ==
- "Central Television has reached a co-production...". The Stage. No. 5894. 31 March 1994. p. 24. ISSN 0038-9099 – via British Newspaper Archive.
- "Forthcoming". TV Zone. No. 48. November 1993. pp. 6–7 – via Internet Archive.
- "Forthcoming". TV Zone. No. 49. December 1993. p. 4 – via Internet Archive.
- "MPAA Ratings". Variety. Vol. 292, no. 14. 24 July 2006. p. 8.
- "Program Guide". The Disney Channel Magazine. Vol. 13, no. 5. October 1995. pp. 29–51 – via Internet Archive.
- "Shake & Quake News". Shivers. No. 10. January 1994. pp. 4–7. ISSN 0965-8238 – via Internet Archive.
- "Who's Selling What at Market". Variety. Vol. 354, no. 10. 11 April 1994. pp. A-6+.
- Adie, Kate (2008). Into Danger: Risking Your Life for Work. London: Hodder & Stoughton. ISBN 978-0-34093-321-3. LCCN 2009417730 – via Internet Archive.
- Cling, Carol (8 October 1996). "Flipper causes a splash on home screens". Las Vegas Review-Journal. p. 1E. ProQuest 260034354.
- Codd, Pat (1 April 1994). "Olly's red hot – he's set to be a monster hit". Daily Star. No. 4750. p. 16 – via British Newspaper Archive.
- Culf, Andrew (16 March 1995). "ITV series win some recognition as Bafta awards embrace a wider range". The Guardian. p. 8. Gale A170636091.
- Hayward, Gillian; Gould, Julie; Johnson, Christine, eds. (1994). The Knowledge. Kent: Benn Business Information Services Limited. ISBN 0-86382-237-1. ISSN 0966-3371 – via Internet Archive.
- Hindes, Andrew (11 December 1995). "Live buys family three-pack". Variety. Vol. 250, no. 6. p. 14.
- Hindes, Andrew (20 August 1996). "Live Ent. ups Mischel, Tehranian to sr. VPs". Variety. Vol. 252, no. 57. p. 3.
- Irons, Brenda (31 March 1994). "Olly breathes fire into new dragon caper". Birmingham Daily News. p. 31 – via British Newspaper Archive.
- Jackson, Bethany (3 October 1996). "Families will 'flip' for kid-friendly flicks". Dayton Daily News. p. 19. ProQuest 253958411.
- Killick, Jane (April 1994). "Stanley's Dragon". TV Zone. No. 53. pp. 20–23 – via Internet Archive.
- Middleton, Richard (28 April 1994). "Dino-Wars". Daily Star. No. 4772. p. 31 – via British Newspaper Archive.
- Rafer, David (June 1994). "Stanley's Dragon, Four Episodes, ITV, Broadcast: April '94". TV Zone. No. 55. p. 34 – via Internet Archive.
- Roberts, Jerry (2009). Encyclopedia of Television Film Directors, Volume 2. London: Scarecrow Press. ISBN 978-0-81086-138-1. LCCN 2008032673 – via Internet Archive.
- Stanley, John (August 2000). Creature Features: The Science Fiction, Fantasy, and Horror Movie Guide, Updated Edition (2nd ed.). New York: Berkley Boulevard Books. ISBN 0-425-17517-0 – via Internet Archive.
