= Frank Cellier (actor) =

English actor (1884–1948)

- Cellier in The 39 Steps, 1935
- Born: François Cellier; 23 February 1884; Surbiton, Surrey, England
- Died: 27 September 1948 (aged 64); London, England
- Years active: 1903–1946
- Spouses: Florence Glossop-Harris (m. 1910; div. 1925) Phyllis Shannaw (m. 1925)
- Children: Antoinette Cellier; Peter Cellier
- Parent(s): François Cellier; Clara Short

François Cellier (23 February 1884 – 27 September 1948), always known as Frank, was an English actor. Early in his career, from 1903 to 1920, he toured in Britain, Germany, the West Indies, America and South Africa. In the 1920s, he became known in the West End for Shakespearean character roles, among others, and also directed some plays in which he acted. He continued to act on stage until 1946. During the 1930s and 1940s, he also appeared in more than three dozen films.

== Life and career ==
=== Early years ===
Cellier was born in Surbiton, Surrey, the only son of the conductor François Cellier and his wife, Clara née Short. He had five sisters and was educated at Cranleigh School. After leaving school, he spent three years in business.

Cellier made his first stage appearance in 1903 as Clement Hale in Arthur Wing Pinero's Sweet Lavender at the Town Hall in Reigate and thereafter made acting his career, also doing some stage manager work. In the autumn of that year he went on tour with William Poel's company in Doctor Faustus, and later toured in a number of Shakespearean roles in the company of Ian Maclaren. He then extended his repertory in a wide variety of roles which he undertook on tour with the actress Florence Nellie Glossop-Harris (d. 1932), daughter of the actor-manager Augustus Harris, whom he married in 1910. She divorced him in 1925. They had a daughter, Antoinette, who became an actress.

Cellier toured not only in Britain, but in Germany and the West Indies, and did not make his debut in London until 1914, when under his own management he appeared in Cheer, Boys, Cheer. After this he toured in America and South Africa, and did not appear again in London until 1920. "By this time," wrote The Times, "his solid merit was appreciated after his long and arduous apprenticeship."

=== Shakespearean and other stage roles ===
Once established, Cellier pursued a career balancing new commercial plays – sometimes farce, often murder drama – and classical roles. His favourite part was Hamlet, and his other Shakespeare roles included Apemantus in Timon of Athens, the title role in Henry IV, Part 2, Cassio in Othello, Touchstone in As You Like It, Angelo in Measure for Measure, Ford in The Merry Wives of Windsor, Quince in A Midsummer Night's Dream and Kent in King Lear. Two of his most celebrated roles were in The Merchant of Venice and Twelfth Night, of which The Times said, "while he could wring the last drop of dramatic tension from the role of Shylock, he could also play Sir Toby Belch in such a way as to bring out the essence of the comedy without suggesting that the old reprobate had never known better days."

In the West End, he directed and played in numerous plays. His roles in these included the Nobleman in The Man with a Load of Mischief (1925), one of Marie Tempest's suitors in Noël Coward's The Marquise (1927), Sir Peter Teazle in The School for Scandal (1929) and the King in the Improper Duchess (1931). He starred in The Duchess of Dantzic in 1932 and appeared as the Marquis D'Arcy in The Mask of Virtue (1935; adapted by Ashley Dukes from a German play, Die Marquise von Arcis, by Carl Sternheim), opposite Vivien Leigh in her West End debut. He also appeared that year in Espionage, a play by Walter Hackett, at the Apollo Theatre. His final stage role was the father in Terence Rattigan's The Winslow Boy in 1946, which he played to great praise in London and was due to take to America but was prevented by ill-health from doing so.

=== Films ===
Beginning in the 1930s, Cellier played roles in films, including Sheriff Watson in Alfred Hitchcock's The 39 Steps (1935). He was also Monsieur Barsac in the comedy film The Guv'nor (1935).

== Death ==
Cellier died in London in 1948, aged 64. His widow was his second wife, the actress Phyllis Shannaw. The actor Peter Cellier is their son.

== Filmography ==
- Gloria (1916) - Louis Martino
- Her Reputation (1931) - Henry Sloane
- Tin Gods (1932) - Major Drake
- The Golden Cage (1933) - Julian Sande
- Soldiers of the King (1933) - Col. Philip Markham
- Doss House (1933) - Editor
- The Song You Gave Me (1933) - Golf Club Patron (uncredited)
- Colonel Blood (1934) - Col. Blood
- The Fire Raisers (1934) - Brent
- Jew Süss (1934) - (uncredited)
- Lorna Doone (1934) - Capt. Jeremy Stickles
- The Dictator (1935) - Sir Murray Keith
- The 39 Steps (1935) - Sheriff Watson
- The Passing of the Third Floor Back (1935) - Wright
- The Guv'nor (1935) - Barsac
- Rhodes of Africa (1936) - Barney Barnato
- Tudor Rose (1936) - Henry VIII
- The Man Who Changed His Mind (1936) - Lord Haslewood / Clayton
- O.H.M.S. (1937) - Regimental Sergeant-Major Briggs
- Action for Slander (1937) - Sir Bernard Roper
- Take My Tip (1937) - Paradine
- Non-Stop New York (1937) - Sam Pryor
- Victoria the Great (1937) - Minor Role (uncredited)
- Kate Plus Ten (1938) - Sir Ralph Sapson
- A Royal Divorce (1938) - Talleyrand
- Sixty Glorious Years (1938) - Lord Derby
- The Ware Case (1938) - Skinner
- The Spider (1940) - Julian Ismay
- The Midas Touch (1940) - Corris Morgan
- Love on the Dole (1941) - Sam Grundy
- Quiet Wedding (1941) - Mr. Clayton
- Cottage to Let (1941) - John Forest
- Jeannie (1941) - Man Who Has Lost His Keys (uncredited)
- Ships with Wings (1942) - Gen. Scarappa
- The Black Sheep of Whitehall (1942) - Innsbach
- The Big Blockade (1942) - German: Schneider
- Give Us the Moon (1944) - Pyke
- Quiet Weekend (1946) - Adrian Barrasford
- The Magic Bow (1946) - Antonio
- Easy Money (1948) - Manager (segment The Teddy Ball Story)
- The Blind Goddess (1948) - The Judge (final film role)
