= Judd Trichter =

American writer and former actor

Judd Trichter is an American writer and former actor. He starred in the 1994 British family fantasy Stanley's Dragon. He has also appeared on television, stage, commercials and film. He has written for The Idiot Magazine and for his blog called "Filth". His debut novel Love in the Age of Mechanical Reproduction was released in 2015.

== Career ==
Trichter's writings explore themes of sexual perversion, drug abuse, and Marxist revolution. His stories feature dark humor and pessimistic depictions of an America with decaying values.

Trichter guest starred on shows including: Requiem (The X-Files), Murphy Brown, This Is Not Happening (The X-Files), ER, Chicago Hope, The Huntress, JAG, Dear John, Law and Order and Bones episode "The Man in the Morgue".
