= May Keating =

- Born: Mary Josephine Walsh; 6 October 1895; Eadestown, Rathmore, County Kildare, Ireland
- Died: 4 March 1965 (aged 69); Rathfarnham, County Dublin, Ireland
- Spouse: Seán Keating

May Keating (6 October 1895 – 4 March 1965) was an Irish socialist, feminist and human rights campaigner.

== Early life and family ==
May Keating was born Mary Josephine Walsh in Eadestown, Rathmore, County Kildare on 6 October 1895. Her parents were John Walsh, a farmer, and Martha (née Cullen), a national school teacher. She had an older brother, Joseph Walsh, who became a doctor and married the writer Una Troy. She attended the Sacred Heart school in Roscrea, County Tipperary as a boarder. After the death of her mother and a bout of rheumatic fever which left lesions on her heart, she was taken from Roscrea and sent to a Sacred Heart convent near Seville, Spain to complete her education. After leaving school, she worked as a bilingual secretary in Seville for a time. She was engaged to a Viscayan engineer, but after his death in a mining explosion in the Basque Country, Keating returned to Ireland in May 1916 to live with an aunt in Raheny, Dublin. She joined the Keating branch (Craobh an Chéitinnigh) of the Gaelic League, where she met the artist Seán Keating. They married in the University Church, St Stephen's Green on 2 May 1919, with Keating listing her religion as "independent" on the marriage certificate as she identified as agnostic. They first lived in rooms on Parnell Square, and later moved to a small rented cottage at Featherbeds, Killakee, County Dublin. They had two sons, Michael (1927–2001) and Justin.

She was a frequent model for her husband's paintings. Keating represents Mother Ireland in the 1924 painting An allegory, and a wife and mother looking hopefully at the construction of the Ardnacrusha hydroelectric power station in the 1929 Night candles are burnt out. She requested that Seán not depict her political activism in his work, but it has been noted that she was a strong influence on his political views. They moved to 'Áit an Chuain', in Willbrook, Ballyboden, Rathfarnham in 1935, where Keating tended the garden and cared for animals, often taking in strays.

== Career ==
Keating trained at Caffrey's Secretarial College, Dublin as a typist, and for a time was secretary to Robert Barton. She then took the position as secretary to Hanna Sheehy-Skeffington, who she had met while working with the Irish White Cross. She spent two months teaching at the Berlitz school, Hamburg in 1922. Having returned to Dublin, she moved in left-wing republican and feminist circles with Charlotte Despard, Rosamond Jacob, Dorothy Macardle, and Harry Kernoff. She was also an active member of the Friends of Soviet Russia. She remained connected to Spain, and was a passionate supporter of the republicans in the Spanish Civil War.

She was an active member of the Dublin branch of Victor Gollancz's Left Book Club, which was founded in October 1936 and led by Sheehy-Skeffington, which encouraged her left-wing and anti-fascist activism. In 1937, she hosted a pro-republican Basque priest, Fr Ramon Laborda during his visit to Ireland, interpreting for him at public meetings organised by the Spanish Aid Committee. She was also a campaigner for women's political and reproductive rights, in particular defending the rights of single mothers to raise their children, helping a number of them personally. She was strongly opposed to the authority of the Catholic church in Irish political and social life. Her activism gained publicity when she sat on the "mother-and-child scheme committee" in 1951, campaigning for the free maternal and infant medical services proposed by the Minister for Health Noël Browne. She and Browne considered founding a new left-wing political party in 1952 when William Norton prevented Browne from joining the Labour party.

The Keatings hosted a wide range of activists, dissidents and radicals in their home throughout the 1950s, as well as often housing and feeding a cohort of struggling poets and artists. They were regular attendees at Austin Clarke's Sunday salons, and were active in many causes including opposing anti-semitism in Ireland and abroad and supporting the 1960s Irish Anti-Apartheid Movement. Keating served on the executive committee of the Irish Campaign for Nuclear Disarmament and was a member of the Irish Council for Civil Liberties. Keating was a central figure in Browne's electoral organisations and fellow left-wing politician Noel Hartnett in the mid-1950s. When Browne was an unsuccessful Fianna Fáil candidate in Dublin South East in 1954, Keating was instrumental in securing his election as an independent candidate in 1957. She attended the meeting convened by Matt Merrigan in October 1956 to discuss the establishment of a new political party, at this meeting Browne and Jack McQuillan advocated for a new left-wing publication. Keating was one of the founders of the left-wing, cooperatively owned and managed monthly journal, The Plough, with James Plunkett and Owen Sheehy-Skeffington. Keating wrote a number of articles, raised subscriptions, assisted in editing, and organised the printing and distribution of the journal. She was an active member of the political discussion group, the 1913 Club, which espoused the socialist nationalism of James Connolly, and was founded by Owen Dudley Edwards, David Thornley and others. Later Thornley described Keating as one of the two greatest influences on his life. In July 1958, the 1913 Club clashed with Browne's and McQuillan's new party, the National Progressive Democrats, with Browne fearing his electoral organisation was being infiltrated by communists from The Plough. This fear led to his denouncement of Keating's son, Justin, who was in line to become an editor of The Plough, as a communist. He then broke from Keating due to her perceived communist sympathies. Merrigan believed her to be a republican socialist, not a communist.

Keating died at her home, 'The Wood', Ballyboden Road, Rathfarnham, on 4 March 1965 of heart failure, and is buried at Cruagh cemetery, Rockbrook, County Dublin.
