= The Gables Mystery =

1938 film

- Directed by: Harry Hughes
- Written by: Harry Hughes
- Based on: The Man at Six by Jack Celestin and Jack DeLeon
- Produced by: Warwick Ward
- Starring: Francis L. Sullivan; Antoinette Cellier; Leslie Perrins
- Cinematography: Bryan Langley
- Edited by: A.R. Gobbett
- Production company: Welwyn Studios
- Distributed by: Metro-Goldwyn-Mayer
- Release date: March 1938
- Running time: 66 minutes
- Country: United Kingdom
- Language: English

The Gables Mystery is a 1938 British crime film directed by Harry Hughes and starring Francis L. Sullivan, Antoinette Cellier and Leslie Perrins. It was written by Hughes, adapted from the 1929 play The Man at Six by Jack Celestin and Jack DeLeon, previously made into a 1931 film of the same title which was also directed by Hughes. It was shot at Welwyn Studios as a quota quickie for release by Metro-Goldwyn-Mayer.

== Preservation status ==
The British Film Institute National Archive holds no stills or ephemera, and no film or video materials.

== Plot ==
Police are called to investigate a murder at a country house named The Gables where they find a number of strange characters living.

== Cast ==
- Francis L. Sullivan as Power
- Antoinette Cellier as Helen Vane
- Leslie Perrins as Inspector Lloyd
- Derek Gorst as Frank Rider
- Jerry Verno as Potts
- Aubrey Mallalieu as Sir James Rider
- Sidney King as Mortimer
- Laura Wright as Mrs Mullins
- Ben Williams as uncredited

== Reception ==
The Monthly Film Bulletin wrote: "There is all the mechanism of suspense, secret doors, disguises, shots and so forth, but little real excitement. Of the caste, Francis Sullivan is easily the most convincing as Power, but the rest both look and sound as if they are acting. The end loses its tension by the calm way the characters seem to regard the presence of an infernal machine in their midst."

Kine Weekly wrote: "The entertainment is very dependent on conventional stage tricks, but in spite of these and occasional narratal obscurity, it couples an adequate quota of thrills with laughter, both intentional and unintentional. Antoinette Cellier, good as the girl, preserves favourable balance. Useful support for the not too sophisticated."

The Daily Film Renter wrote: "It is not always easy to understand the development, while conviction is almost completely lacking. There is, however, a fair quota of suspense at the climax."
