= The Call of the Road =

1920 British film by A. E. Coleby

- Directed by: A. E. Coleby
- Produced by: I. B. Davidson
- Starring: Victor McLaglen; Phyllis Shannaw; Warwick Ward
- Production company: I. B. Davidson
- Release date: October 1920
- Country: United Kingdom
- Languages: Silent; English intertitles

The Call of the Road is a 1920 British silent historical adventure film directed by A. E. Coleby and starring Victor McLaglen, Phyllis Shannaw and Warwick Ward.

== Cast ==
- Victor McLaglen as Alf Truscott
- Phyllis Shannaw as Lady Rowena
- Warwick Ward as Lord Delavel
- Philip Williams as Sir Martin Trevor
- A. E. Coleby as Punch Murphy
- Adeline Hayden Coffin as Lady Ullswater
- Ernest A. Douglas as Silas
- Henry Nicholls-Bates as Paganini Primus
- Barry Furness as Pagnini Secundus
- Fred Drummond as Hammer John
- Olive Bell as Miller's Wife
- Cyril McLaglen
- Tom Ronald as Master Alfred's Man
- Eric Royce as Master Ulleswater

== Bibliography ==
- Low, Rachel. The History of British Film: Volume IV, 1918–1929. Routledge, 1997.
