= Mary Read (play) =

1934 historical play by James Bridie

- Written by: James Bridie
- Original language: English
- Genre: Historical

Premiere
- Date premiered: 12 November 1934
- Place premiered: Manchester Opera House

Mary Read is a 1934 historical play by the British writer James Bridie and Claud Gurney, based on the life of the early eighteenth century pirate Mary Read.

After premiering at the Manchester Opera House it ran for a 108 performances in London's West End, first at His Majesty's Theatre before transferring to the Phoenix Theatre. Produced by Tyrone Guthrie, it starred Flora Robson in the title role supported by a cast that included Robert Donat, Claud Allister, Charles Farrell and Iris Hoey.

== Bibliography ==
- Wearing, J.P. The London Stage 1930–1939: A Calendar of Productions, Performers, and Personnel. Rowman & Littlefield, 2014.
