= Justin Keating =

Irish politician (1930–2009)

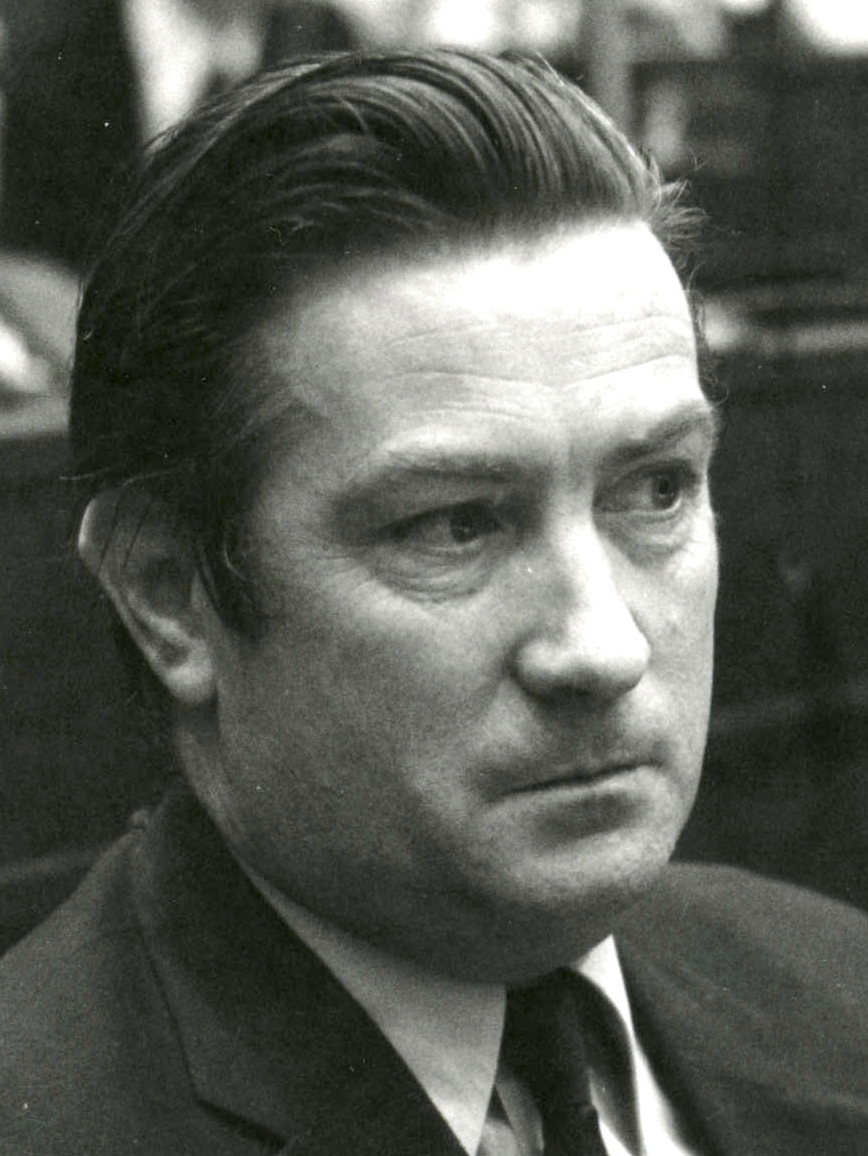
- Keating in 1973

Minister for Industry and Commerce
- In office 14 March 1973 – 5 July 1977
- Taoiseach: Liam Cosgrave
- Preceded by: Patrick Lalor
- Succeeded by: Desmond O'Malley

Teachta Dála
- In office June 1969 – June 1977
- Constituency: Dublin County North

Senator
- In office 27 October 1977 – 8 October 1981
- Constituency: Agricultural Panel

Member of the European Parliament
- In office February – June 1984
- Constituency: Leinster
- In office January – February 1973
- Constituency: Oireachtas Delegation

Personal details
- Born: 7 January 1930 Dublin, Ireland
- Died: 31 December 2009 (aged 79) Ballymore Eustace, County Kildare, Ireland
- Party: Labour Party
- Spouses: Loretta Wine (m. 1953–1991); Barbara Hussey (m. 2005)
- Children: 3
- Parents: Seán Keating (father); Mary Walsh (mother)
- Education: University College Dublin; University of London

Justin Pascal Keating (7 January 1930 – 31 December 2009) was an Irish Labour Party politician, broadcaster, journalist, lecturer and veterinary surgeon. In later life he was president of the Humanist Association of Ireland.

Keating was twice elected to Dáil Éireann and served in Liam Cosgrave's cabinet as Minister for Industry and Commerce from 1973 to 1977. He also gained election to Seanad Éireann and was a Member of the European Parliament. He was considered part of a "new wave" of politicians at the time of his entry to the Dáil.

== Early life ==
He was born in Dublin in 1930, a son of the noted painter Seán Keating and campaigner May Keating. Keating was educated at Sandford Park School, and then at University College Dublin (UCD) and the University of London. He became a lecturer in anatomy at the UCD veterinary college from 1955 until 1960 and was senior lecturer at Trinity College Dublin from 1960 until 1965. He was RTÉ's head of agricultural programmes for two years before returning to Trinity College in 1967. While at RTÉ, he scripted and presented Telefís Feirme, a series for the agricultural community, for which he won a Jacob's Award in 1966.

== Political career ==
In the 1950s and 1960s Keating was a member of the Communist Irish Workers' Party. Keating was first elected to the Dáil as a Labour Party Teachta Dála (TD) for the Dublin County North constituency at the 1969 general election. From 1973 to 1977 he served in the National Coalition government under Liam Cosgrave as Minister for Industry and Commerce. In 1973 he was appointed a Member of the European Parliament from the Oireachtas, serving on the short-lived first delegation. During 1975 Keating introduced the first substantial legislation for the development of Ireland's oil and gas. The legislation was modelled on international best practice and intended to ensure the Irish people would gain substantial benefit from their own oil and gas. Under Keating's legislation the state could by right acquire a 50% stake in any viable oil and gas reserves discovered. Production royalties of between 8% and 16% with corporation tax of 50% would accrue to the state. The legislation specified that energy companies would begin drilling within three years of the date of the issue of an exploration licence.

He lost his Dáil seat at the 1977 general election, but was subsequently elected to Seanad Éireann on the Agricultural Panel, serving there until 1981. He briefly served again in the European Parliament from February to June 1984 when he replaced Séamus Pattison.

== Later life and death ==
In the aftermath of President of Iran Mahmoud Ahmadinejad's "World Without Zionism" speech in 2005, Keating published an op-ed in The Dubliner Magazine, expressing his views on Israel. The article started by claiming that "the Zionists have absolutely no right in what they call Israel". Keating then proceeds to explain why he thinks Israel has no right to exist, claiming that the Ashkenazi Jews are descended from Khazars.

Keating died on 31 December 2009, at age 79, one week before his 80th birthday. Tributes came from the leaders of the Labour Party and Fine Gael at the time of his death, Eamon Gilmore and Enda Kenny, as well as former Fine Gael leader and Taoiseach John Bruton.

Political offices
Preceded by Patrick Lalor	Minister for Industry and Commerce; 1973–1977	Succeeded by Desmond O'Malley

Dáil	Election	Deputy (Party)	Deputy (Party)	Deputy (Party)	Deputy (Party)
19th	1969	Patrick Burke (FF)	Des Foley (FF)	Mark Clinton (FG)	Justin Keating (Lab)
20th	1973	Patrick Burke (FF)	Seán Walsh (FF)	Mark Clinton (FG)	Justin Keating (Lab)
21st	1977	Ray Burke (FF)	Joe Fox (FF)	John Boland (FG)	3 seats 1977–1981
22nd	1981	Constituency abolished. See Dublin North			
