= Antoinette Cellier =

English actress (1913–1981)

- Cellier from Film Star Who's Who on the Screen (1938).
- Born: Florence Antoinette Glossop Cellier; 23 June 1913; Broadstairs, Kent, England
- Died: 18 January 1981 (aged 67); Chelsea, London, England
- Occupation: Actress
- Spouse: Bruce Seton (m. 1940; died 1969)
- Children: 1
- Parent(s): Frank Cellier; Florence Glossop-Harris
- Relatives: Augustus Harris (maternal grandfather); François Cellier (paternal grandfather); Alfred Cellier (great-uncle); Peter Cellier (half-brother); Phyllis Shannaw (stepmother)

Antoinette Cellier, Lady Seton (23 June 1913 – 18 January 1981) was an English film and theatre actress. She appeared in fifteen feature films in the 1930s and 1940s. She was married to soldier and actor Sir Bruce Lovat Seton, 11th Baronet of Abercorn.

== Family ==
She was born Florence Antoinette Glossop Cellier in Broadstairs, Kent, England. Her father, Frank Cellier, was a film and theatre actor, and her mother was Florence Glossop-Harris. Her grandparents included Augustus Harris, the actor-manager, and François Cellier, musical director of the Savoy Theatre. Her half-brother Peter Cellier also became a film, television and theatre actor.

In 1940, Cellier became the second wife of soldier and actor Sir Bruce Lovat Seton, 11th Baronet of Abercorn (1909–1969). They had a daughter, Lydia Antoinette Gordon Seton (born 14 November 1941). After her husband's death in 1969, his Baronial title passed to his cousin Christopher Bruce Seton.

== Career ==
Cellier was trained at the Royal Academy of Dramatic Art in London. She made her stage début in the London's West End in Firebird. Other stage performances included in the Day After Tomorrow at the Fortune Theatre, Quiet Weekend at the Playhouse Theatre, This Money Business at the Ambassadors Theatre, Coincidence at St Martin’s Theatre, and Sixteen at the Criterion Theatre.

Cellier's first film appearance was in Music Hath Charms (1935) and she subsequently made fifteen feature films in the 1930s and 1940s.

== Filmography ==
- Late Extra (1935)
- Music Hath Charms (1935)
- Royal Cavalcade (1935)
- The Tenth Man (1936)
- Ourselves Alone (1936)
- Death Croons the Blues (1937)
- The Great Barrier (1937)
- The Gables Mystery (1938)
- Lucky to Me (1939)
- I Killed the Count (1939)
- At the Villa Rose (1940)
- Dear Octopus (1943)
- Headline (1944)
- Bees in Paradise (1944)
- The End of the River (1947)

== Death ==
Cellier died 18 January 1981, age 67, in Chelsea, London, England.
