= Death Croons the Blues =

1937 British film by David MacDonald

- Hugh Wakefield and Minnie Rayner in the film
- Directed by: David MacDonald
- Written by: James Ronald (novel); H. Fowler Mear
- Produced by: Julius Hagen
- Starring: Hugh Wakefield; Antoinette Cellier; George Hayes; Hugh Burden
- Cinematography: Sydney Blythe
- Music by: W.L. Trytel
- Production company: St. Margaret's Films
- Distributed by: Metro-Goldwyn-Mayer
- Release date: October 1937
- Running time: 74 minutes
- Country: United Kingdom

Death Croons the Blues is a 1937 British crime film directed by David MacDonald and starring Hugh Wakefield, Antoinette Cellier and George Hayes. The film was made at Twickenham Studios by the producer Julius Hagen whose ownership of the company was about to be ended due to financial problems.

== Preservation status ==
The British Film Institute National Archive holds no stills or ephemera, and no film or video materials.

== Plot ==
When cabaret singer Adele Vallee is discovered dead in her flat, Viscount Brent becomes the prime suspect after the crime scene is meticulously staged to frame him. Convinced of his innocence, his cousin, Lady Constance, teams up with Jim Morton, the investigative reporter covering the case, to clear Brent's name. Through their efforts, they ultimately unmask the real killer.

== Cast ==
- Hugh Wakefield as Jim Morton
- Zoe Wynn as Adele Vallee
- Antoinette Cellier as Lady Constance Gaye
- George Hayes as Hugo Branker
- Hugh Burden as Viscount Brent
- Minnie Rayner
- Gillian Lind
- John Turnbull
- Barbara Everest

== Reception ==
The Monthly Film Bulletin wrote: "Hugh Wakefield takes the part of the reporter and creditably staggers through it, most of his remarks being made in the correct high-pitched slur of the drunk, the drawback to this piece of realistic acting being that his words are not always very clear and the effort to understand becomes a monotonous strain. ... The story follows the usual crime story lines, but the passion for the 'true to life' mixes oddly with the fantastic adventures of the reporter and the girl. What humour there is in the film is wrung from the drunkenness of Morton and the downfall of a flinty slum landlady when snubbed by Lady Constance. The director handles his material melodramatically; the photography and acting are good."

Kine Weekly wrote: "Hugh Wakefield is amusing at times as the alcoholic Morton, but his performance lacks conviction when seriousness is demanded. Antoinette Cellier is adequate as Constance, but George Haves grossly overacts as the villain, Branker. The support is of little account. ... This melodrama is prevented from grappling with reality by the long arm or coincidence. It unfolds with such mechanical precision that intended thrills merely hocome stillborn heirs of the obvious. There is a fair amount of comedy, but this too, is too forced to save the fictional face. The film is purely a pot-boiler."

The Daily Film Renter wrote: "Dialogue lacks snap and humour is weak, but constant introduction of fresh situations into main narrative maintains moderate level of interest. Average supporting offer."
