= Viola Keats =

British actress (1911–1998)

- in The Guv'nor (1935)
- Born: 27 March 1911; Doune, Perthshire, Scotland, UK
- Died: 5 June 1998 (aged 87); Brighton, Sussex, England, UK
- Occupation: Actress
- Years active: 1933–1976
- Spouse(s): Harold Peterson (deceased); William Kellner (deceased)

Viola Keats (1911–1998) was a British stage, film and television actress. The Independent called her "an actress of vigour and conviction." After training at RADA, her first appearance on the London Stage was at the Apollo Theatre in 1933, in The Distaff Side, and the following year she made her Broadway debut in the same play. Her first screen appearance was in 1933 in Too Many Wives, and she went on to have starring roles in films such as A Woman Alone. From the 1950s, her screen work was largely in television, but she continued to work throughout in the theatre, including an Australian tour of A Streetcar Named Desire as Blanche, and in the 1958 Agatha Christie play Verdict at the Strand Theatre. She spent her retirement living in Brighton.

== Filmography ==
- Double Wedding (1933)
- Too Many Wives (1933)
- Matinee Idol (1933)
- Enemy of the Police (1933)
- His Grace Gives Notice (1933)
- The Pointing Finger (1933)
- Too Many Millions (1934)
- Her Last Affaire (1935)
- The Night of the Party (1935)
- The Guv'nor (1935)
- A Woman Alone (1936)
- No Time for Tears (1957)
- She Didn't Say No! (1958)
- Escort for Hire (1960)
- Two Wives at One Wedding (1961)
- The Roman Spring of Mrs. Stone (1961)
- On the Fiddle (1961)
- Tamahine (1963)
- Witchcraft (1964)
- The Witches (1966)
