= Perlita Neilson =

English actress (1933–2014)

- Born: Margaret Phillipa Sowden; 11 June 1933; Bradford, Yorks, UK
- Died: 7 April 2014 (aged 80); Brighton, UK
- Occupation: Actress

Perlita Neilson (born Margaret Phillipa Sowden; 11 June 1933 – 7 April 2014) was an English film, stage and television actress. She was educated at the Aida Foster Theatre School. One of her most notable roles was in 1957 as Anne Frank in the London production of The Diary of Anne Frank.

== Personal life ==
She was born Margaret Phillipa Sowden in Bradford, but spent her early life in Argentina, where her father, Wilson Sowden, worked as an engineer. After her birth, her mother Isabella (née Gibson) returned to Buenos Aires, where Margaret attended stage school. She began her career at age nine with a variety group of the British Community Players. She married Bruce Sharman in 1956 in Surrey, UK. She married Henry Neilson in 1961 in Surrey, UK. She died at age 80 in Brighton.

== Filmography ==
Date	Production	Character
1949	Three Bags Full	
1951	Looking for Trouble	Pamela
1952	Lace on Her Petticoat	Lady Alexander Carmichael
1952	Portrait of Rembrandt	Cornelia
1953	The Story of Gilbert and Sullivan	Lettie
1953	Trouble in Store	Mabel
1957	ITV Television Playhouse – The Roof Garden	
1958	She Didn't Say No!	Mary Monaham
1959	William Tell	Anna Gessler
1959	ITV Television Playhouse – The Skin of Our Teeth	Gladys Antrobus
1959	The Eustace Diamonds	Lucy Morris
1960	The Four Just Men	Marie
1960	Emma	Harriet Smith
1960	The Vise – The Maid Was Curious	
1961	Maigret – "On Holiday"	Sister Marie des Anges
1965	The Flying Swan – "The Age of Consent"	Sarah Barnes
1974	Fall of Eagles – "The English Princess"	Queen Victoria
1981	The Day of the Triffids	Miss Durant
