= Sinn Féin (slogan) =

Irish-language political slogans

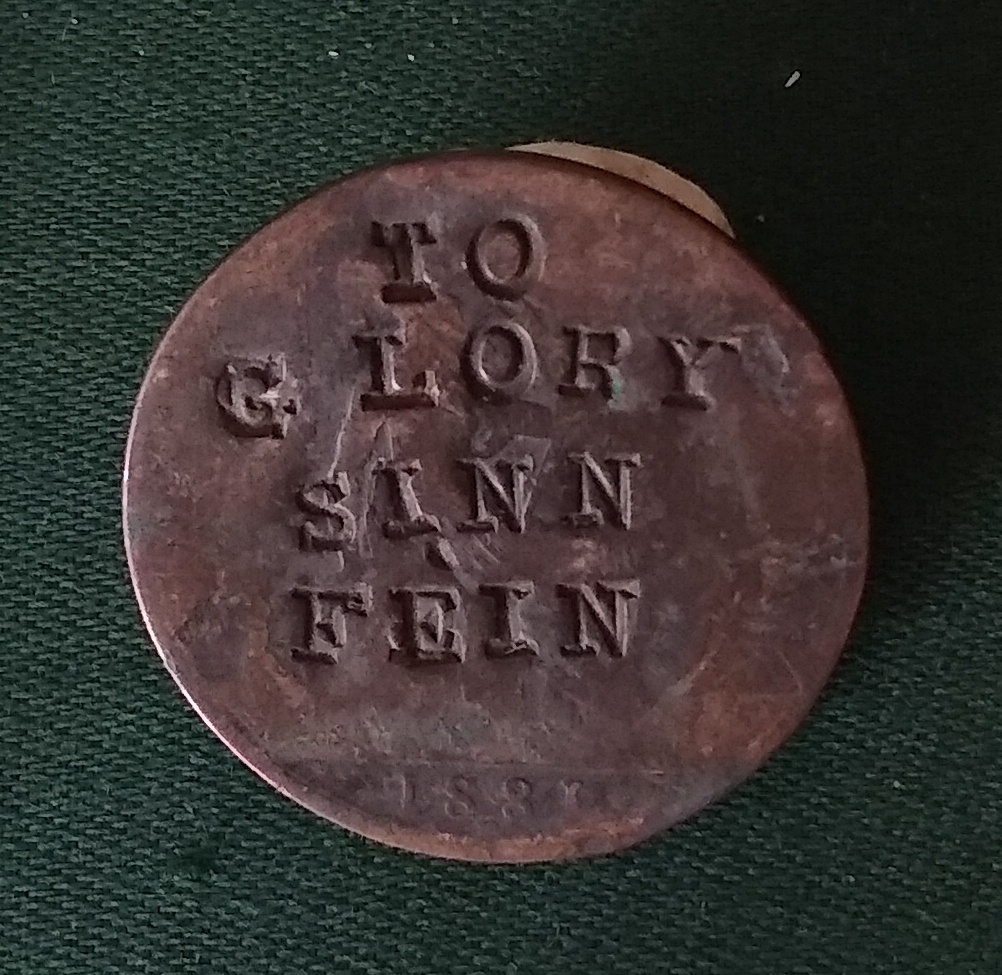
An 1881 penny stamped "TO GLORY SINN FEIN"

Sinn Féin (/ˌʃɪn‖ˈfeɪn/) ("ourselves" or "we ourselves") and Sinn Féin Amháin ("ourselves only / ourselves alone / solely us") are Irish-language phrases used as a political slogan by Irish nationalists in the late nineteenth and early twentieth century. While advocating Irish national self-reliance, its precise political meaning was undefined, variously interpreted as the aim of a separate Irish republic or (as advocated by Arthur Griffith) that of a dual monarchy. Its earliest use was to describe individual political radicals unconnected with any party and espousing a more "advanced nationalism" than the Irish Home Rule movement represented by the Irish Parliamentary Party (IPP). In the 1890s "Sinn Féin, Sinn Féin amháin" was the slogan of the Gaelic League, which advocated the revival of the Irish language.

== "Ourselves Alone" ==
The literal translation of sinn féin is "ourselves" or "we ourselves". Among Irish speakers, "Sinn féin! Sinn féin!" was also an exhortation to quell a brimming feud, i.e. "we are all one here!" When English-speakers adopted the slogan, the most common gloss was "ourselves alone", which was also used as a political slogan; it is unclear whether the English or Irish version came first. Ben Novick says the less accurate translation was adopted "as it more clearly summed up the philosophy behind the movement". Similarly, Tom Kettle wrote in 1908: '"Sinn Fein" ... is the Irish for "Ourselves." In its propagandist use, it simply means "Rely on yourself alone" ... a sound, if not very startling, principle'. On the other hand, Alvin Jackson says "ourselves alone" may have been a construct of opponents to highlight the political isolation of those using the slogan, or the perceived selfishness of abandoning Britain, as in this Punch parody from the First World War:

[..]For Truth and Right the fools may fight,
We fight but for "Ourselves Alone."[..]

Christopher Hitchens, writing of the Field Day anthology of Irish literature, says:

[T]here is a wonderfully strict correction of Louis MacNeice. In 'Autumn Journal' he commits the solecism of translating the Gaelic words Sinn Fein as 'Ourselves Alone'. This is how every English schoolboy has been taught to render these words since before the Black and Tans. No, say the editors – Messrs Heaney and Friel and Deane and Paulin and Carpenter and William[s] and the rest. This is too common a mistake. The words mean 'We Ourselves'. I cannot think how such an important literal translation, with all its ironic implications, took so long to be made. Still, what correction could be made with more grace? Who will not be sad to think of what was perhaps lost in translation?

Ourselves Alone was a 1936 British film, set during the Anglo-Irish War of 1919–21.

== Early uses ==
A collection was published in 1845 of poems printed in The Nation, the nationalist newspaper of the Young Irelanders. It includes a poem entitled Ourselves Alone by "Sliabh Cuilinn" (John O'Hagan):

[...]Too long our Irish hearts we schooled
In patient hopes to bide,
By dreams of English justice fooled
And English tongues that lied.
That hour of weak delusion's past—
The empty dream has flown :
Our hope and strength, we find at last,
Is in OURSELVES ALONE.[...]

Another poem in the same volume, The Spirit of the Nation by D.F. McCarthy, uses the expression "Sinn Féin". The gloss in the original for this is 'Ourselves—or "OURSELVES ALONE."'

[...]A chuisle mo chroidhe, we are wounded and sore,
So bad that we cannot endure it much more.
A cure we must have, though the Saxons may stare
And "curse like a trooper;" but devil may care,
Sinn Féin is our watch-word—so devil may care.[...]

The glossary at the end of the volume renders sinn féin as "we ourselves".

A nationalist play by "Tom Telephone" (Thomas Stanislaus Cleary) published in 1882 was entitled Shin Fain; or Ourselves Alone.

In James Joyce's novel Ulysses, set in 1904, The Citizen, a boorish nationalist partly modelled on Michael Cusack, shouts "Sinn Féin! Sinn Féin amháin!" during an altercation with Leopold Bloom; these were also the titles of two nationalist ballads.

== After 1905 ==
The name was adopted by Arthur Griffith for the "Sinn Féin policy" he presented in 1905, and the Sinn Féin party formed over 1905–07. Irish poet Brian O'Higgins wrote Sinn Féin's first rallying song titled Sinn Féin Amháin in 1905 and the song was sung at all gatherings of the organisation for a number of years.

In the 1910s, "Sinn Feiners" was a common, often derogatory, label for militant nationalists, regardless of any connection to Griffith's movement. A 1915 mock-unionist article in a University College Dublin student journal distinguished types of Irish nationalist:

The principal factions are the Separatists, who want to set up a Republic by force of arms; the Sinn Féiners, who want to get the Union repealed by means of passive resistance; and the Constitutionalists, who want to win Home Rule by speechifying. There are also some people who want to set up Home Rule by force of arms, but they are not worth considering, for they haven't any arms.

When the Irish Volunteers split in September 1914, the more militant group was soon dubbed the "Sinn Féin Volunteers" by the security forces of the Dublin Castle administration. Likewise, the 1916 Easter Rising was quickly dubbed the "Sinn Féin rebellion" by British-oriented newspapers. However, the Sinn Féin party had no role in the Volunteers or the Rising, although many members had participated. All members of the party's National Council were interned after the Rising. The distinction between the specific party and the broader slogan of radical nationalism was finally blurred in 1917, when Griffith yielded leadership of the party to Éamon de Valera, the senior surviving leader of the Rising. In the revolutionary period the future national flag and national anthem were dubbed the "Sinn Féin flag" and "Sinn Féin anthem" not only by unionists but also by IPP supporters, who favoured the green flag with gold harp and "God Save Ireland".

Sir Warren Fisher was sent by the UK government in 1920 to report on the Dublin Castle administration; in his highly critical report, he stated:

the phrase 'Sinn Fein' is a shibboleth with which everyone not a 'loyalist' is denounced, and from listening to the people with influence you would certainly gather that Sinn Fein and outrage were synonymous.
