= Seán Keating =

Irish painter

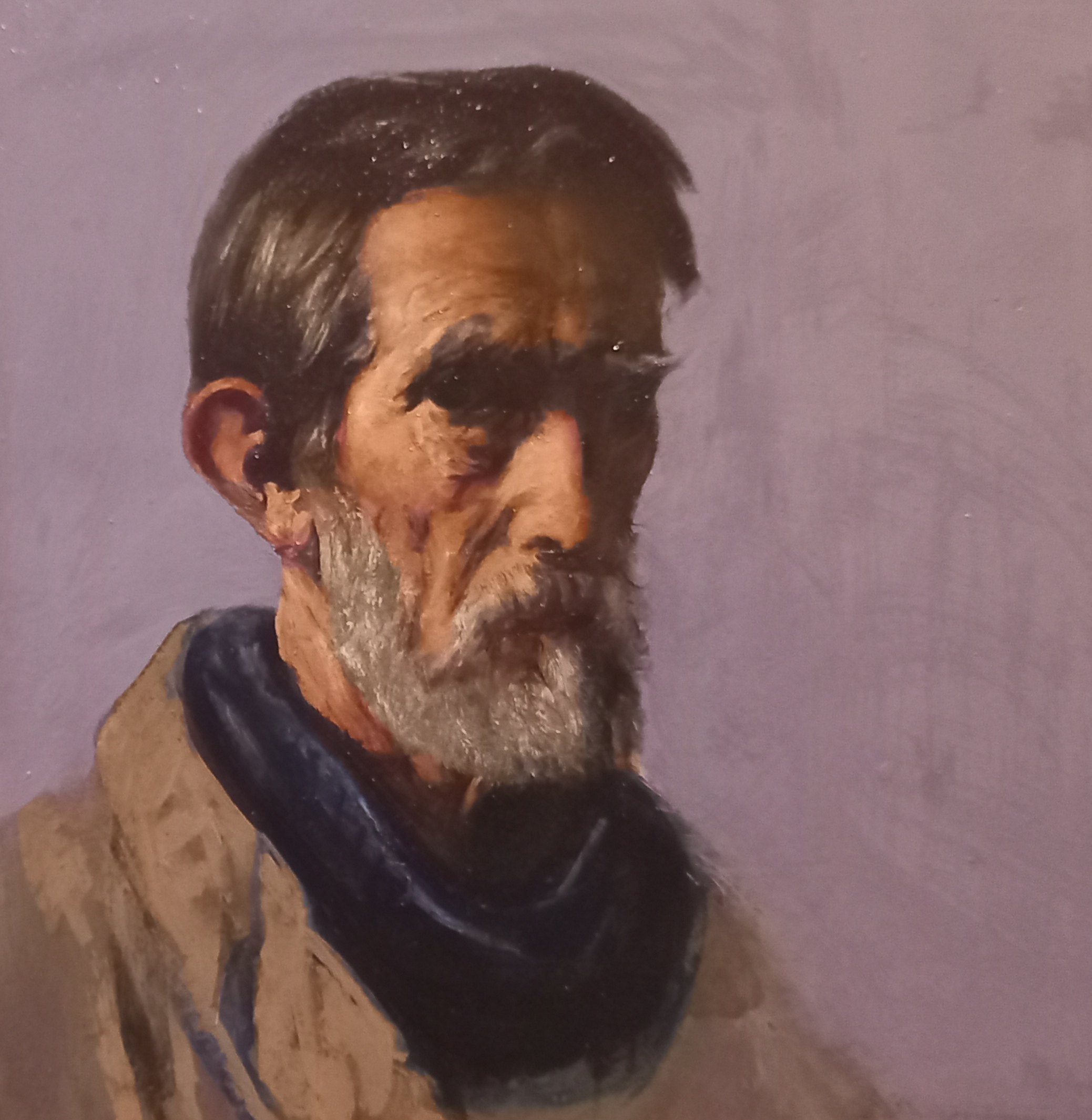
- Self-portrait of Keating in the Hunt Museum
- Born: John Keating; 28 September 1889; County Limerick, Ireland
- Died: 21 December 1977 (aged 88); Dublin, Ireland
- Education: Dublin Metropolitan School of Art
- Known for: Irish romantic-realist painter
- Notable work: Men of the South, Irish Gothic, An Allegory, Night's Candles Are Burnt Out, Race of the Gael

Seán Keating (born John Keating; 28 September 1889 – 21 December 1977) was an Irish romantic-realist painter who painted some iconic images of the Irish War of Independence and of the early industrialization of Ireland. He spent two weeks or so each year during the late summer on the Aran Islands and his many portraits of island people depicted them as rugged heroic figures.

== Life and career ==
Men of the South, 1921–22, Crawford Art Gallery, Cork.

Seán Keating studied drawing at the Limerick Technical School before a scholarship arranged by William Orpen allowed him to go at the age of twenty to study at the Metropolitan School of Art in Dublin. Over the next few years, he spent time on the Aran Islands. In 1914 Keating won the RDS Taylor award with a painting titled The Reconciliation. The prize included £50 which allowed him to go to London to work as Orpen's studio assistant in 1915. In late 1915 or early 1916, he returned to Ireland where he documented the War of Independence and the subsequent Civil War. Examples include Men of the South (1921–22) which shows a group of IRA men ready to ambush a military vehicle and An Allegory (first exhibited in 1924), in which the two opposing sides in the Irish Civil War are seen to bury a tricolour-covered coffin amid the roots on an ancient tree. The painting includes a self-portrait of the artist.

An Allegory, 1924, National Gallery of Ireland.

Keating was elected an Associate of the Royal Hibernian Academy (RHA) in 1918, and a full member in 1923. One of the cardinal achievements of the Irish Free State in the 1920s was the building, in partnership with Siemens, of a hydro-electric power generator at Ardnacrusha, near Limerick. Between 1926 and 1927 Keating, at his own initiative, produced a considerable number of paintings related to this scheme. He exhibited several examples of the paintings in the RHA exhibitions in 1927 and 1928. Most are now in the collection of ESB Group. His work was also part of the art competitions at the 1924 Summer Olympics and the 1928 Summer Olympics.

In 1936 a group of prominent Limerick politicians, artists and patrons established the first Limerick City Collection of Art, made up of various donations and bequests. Keating was part of this artist-led initiative to form a municipal art gallery in Limerick similar to those already in Dublin and Cork. As a pivotal member of the committee, Keating himself donated many works to the collection which was first exhibited in the Savoy Cinema, Limerick City, on 23 November 1937. It was not until 1948, however, that an extension to the rear of Limerick Free Library and Museum became the permanent home to the City Collection, acquiring the name of the Limerick Free Art Gallery. In 1985 the Library and Museum were transferred to larger buildings.

In 1939 Keating was commissioned to paint a mural for the Irish pavilion at the New York World's Fair. He was President of the Royal Hibernian Academy from 1948 to 1962, and showed at the annual exhibition for 61 years from 1914 onwards. Keating was an intellectual painter in the sense that he consciously set out to explore the visual identity of the Irish nation, and his paintings show a very idealised realism. He feared that the modern movement would lead to a decline in artistic standards. Throughout his career, he exhibited nearly 300 works at the RHA, and also showed at the Oireachtas.

Keating married political campaigner, May Walsh, in 1919. She was a frequent model for his paintings until her death in 1965. He died on 21 December 1977 at the Adelaide Hospital and was buried at Cruagh Cemetery, Rathfarnham. The 1978 RHA Exhibition featured a small memorial collection of his work.

Posthumous exhibitions of his paintings were held by The Grafton Gallery, Dublin (1986) and the Electricity Supply Board (1987). Sean Keating – The Pilgrim Soul, a documentary presented and written by his son, the politician Justin Keating, aired on RTÉ in 1996.

== Recent exhibitions ==
- 'Seán Keating in Focus' - curated by Dr. Éimear O'Connor, The Hunt Museum Limerick - with eponymous catalogue.
- 'Seán Keating: Contemporary Contexts' curated by Dr. Éimear O'Connor in association with The Crawford Gallery of Art, June–October 2012 - with associated catalogue.
- 'Seán Keating and the ESB: Enlightenment and Legacy' curated by Dr. Éimear O'Connor in association with ESB, The RHA Gallery, July–September 2012 - with associated catalogue available from ESB.

== Recent publications ==
- Éimear O'Connor Seán Keating: Art, Politics and Building the Irish Nation (Kildare: Irish Academic Press 2013)
- Éimear O'ConnorSeán Keating: Responses to Culture and Politics in Post-Civil War Ireland (Dublin: Carysfort Press 2009)

== Work in collections ==
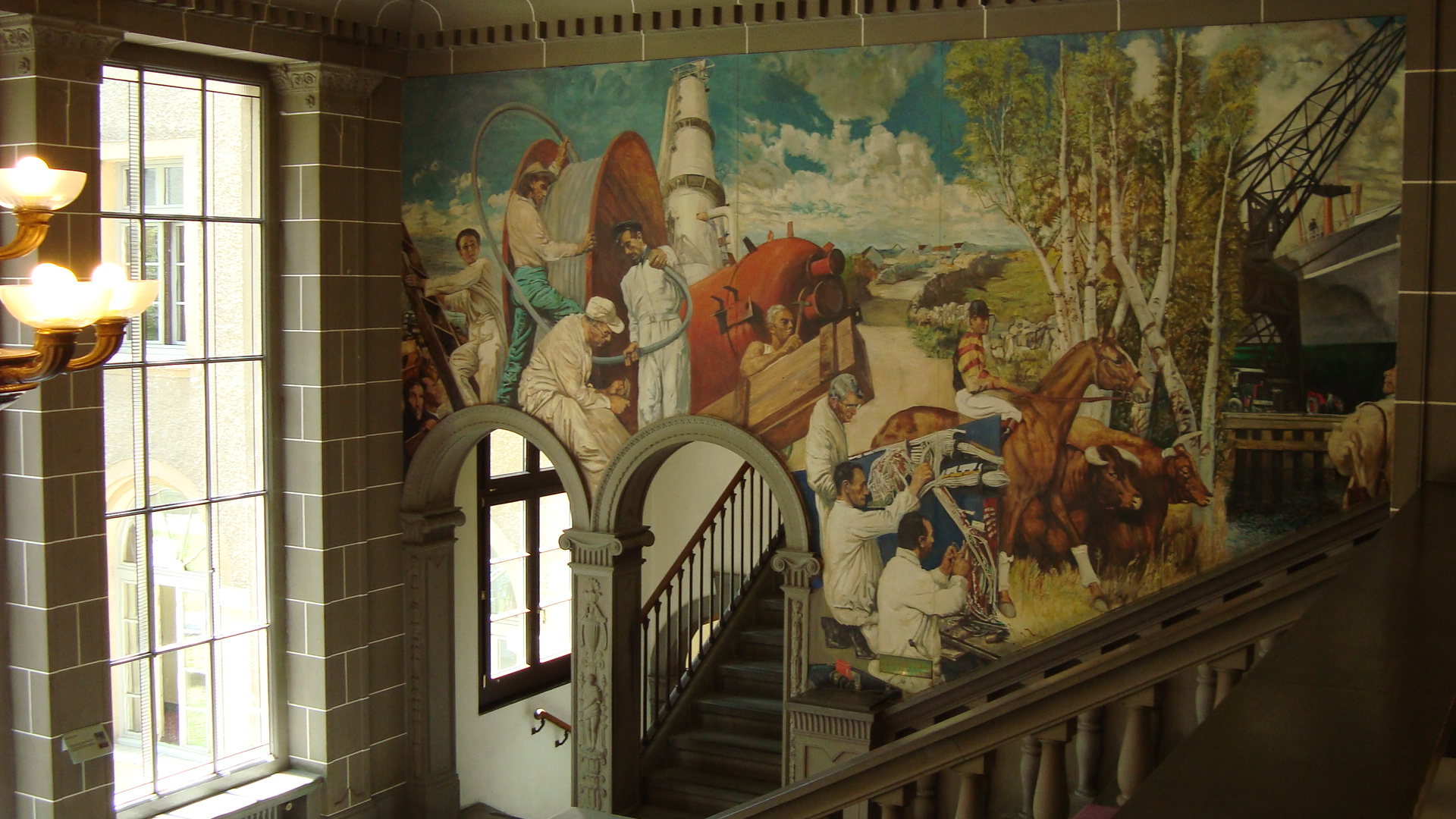
Mural on Labour (1961) at the Centre William Rappard in Geneva, Switzerland.

- The Electrical Supply Board in Ireland.
- The National Gallery of Ireland, Dublin, including
  - An Allegory (c.1922)
- Crawford Municipal Art Gallery, Cork, including
  - Men of the South (1921)
- Trinity College Dublin including
  - Portrait of Erwin Schrödinger (1956)
- Limerick City Gallery of Art, Limerick, including
  - The Kelp Burners, Maria, Country Dance, Simple Folk and a Self Portrait.
- Centre William Rappard
  - Mural on Labour (1961)
