= The Right to Live (1921 film) =

1921 film

- Directed by: A. E. Coleby
- Written by: A. E. Coleby
- Starring: A. E. Coleby; Phyllis Shannaw; Peter Upcher; Marguerite Hare
- Release date: 1921
- Country: United Kingdom
- Language: English

The Right to Live is a 1921 British silent drama film written by, directed by and starring A. E. Coleby. The screenplay concerns a Cockney fishmonger who tracks down his estranged niece who is an aspiring actress and then loses his family's savings gambling on a trotting race.

== Main cast ==
- A. E. Coleby - Bill Rivers
- Phyllis Shannaw - Marjorie Dessalar
- Peter Upcher - Sir Robert Martindale
- Marguerite Hare - Mrs. Rivers
- Henry Nicholls-Bates - Grandpa Rivers
