= Her Reputation (1931 film) =

1931 film

- Directed by: Sidney Morgan
- Screenplay by: Sidney Morgan
- Based on: Passing Brompton Road by Jevan Brandon-Thomas
- Produced by: Sidney Morgan
- Starring: Iris Hoey; Frank Cellier; Lillian Hall-Davis
- Production company: London Screenplays
- Distributed by: Paramount British Pictures
- Release date: July 1931
- Running time: 67 minutes
- Country: United Kingdom
- Language: English

Her Reputation is a 1931 British comedy film directed by Sidney Morgan and starring Iris Hoey, Frank Cellier and Lillian Hall-Davis. It was based on the play Passing Brompton Road by Jevan Brandon-Thomas. It was made at British and Dominions Elstree Studios as a quota quickie for distribution by Paramount British Pictures.

== Synopsis ==
A woman plans to boost her public profile by getting a divorce and enlists the help of a male friend to act as co-respondent. This leads to a series of mix-ups and her eventual decision not to get divorced.

== Cast ==
- Iris Hoey as Dultitia Sloane
- Frank Cellier as Henry Sloane
- Malcolm Tearle as George Harding
- Lillian Hall-Davis as Carruthers
- Maurice Braddell as Eric Sloane
- Joan Morgan as Veronica Sloane
- Dorothy Black as Georgina Pastell
- Laurence Hanray as Mr. Montgomery
