= Marten Cumberland =

British journalist, novelist and editor (1892–1972)

Sydney Walter Martin "Marten" Cumberland (23 July 1892 – 1972) was an English journalist, novelist and editor. He also wrote under the pseudonym Kevin O'Hara. He specialised in the detective/mystery genre and created the character of Inspector Saturnin Dax, a French policeman.

During World War I, Cumberland served as a radio operator in the Merchant Navy. After the war, he worked successively for several newspapers and publishing houses as a writer. He also composed some detective stories for various magazines. He became a freelance journalist in 1924.

In 1923, Cumberland published his first novel, Loaded Dice, which he co-wrote with B.V. Shann. He married Kathleen Walsh in 1928. In his last years, he moved to Dublin, where he died in 1972.

== Bibliography ==
- Loaded Dice (with BV Shann) (1926)
- The Perilous Way (1926)
- The Diary of Death (1928)
- Mate in Three Moves (1929)
- The Sin of David (1932)
- The Dark House (1935)
- Devil's Snare (1935)
- The Impostor (1935)
- Murder at Midnight (with BV Shann) (1935)
- Shadowed (1936)
- Bird of Prey (1937)
- Someone Must Die (1940)
- Questionable Shape (1941)
- Quislings Over Paris (1942)
- The Knife Will Fall (1943)
- The Testing of Tony (1943)
- Everything He Touched (1945)
- Not Expected to Live (1945)
- Steps in the Dark (1945)
- A Lovely Corpse (1946)
- Darkness As a Bride (1947)
- Hearsed in Death (aka A Dilemma for Dax) (1947)
- And Worms Have Eaten Them (aka Hate Will Find a Way) (1948)
- And Then Came Fear (1949)
- The Crime School (1949)
- On the Danger List (1950)
- Policeman's Nightmare (1950)
- Confetti Red Can Be (aka The House in the Forest) (1951)
- The Man Who Covered Mirrors (1951)
- Booked for Death (aka Grave Consequences) (1952)
- Fade Out the Stars (1952)
- One Foot in the Grave (1952)
- The Charge Is Murder (1953)
- Etched in Violence (1953)
- Which of Us Is Safe? (aka Nobody Is Safe) (1953)
- The Frightened Brides (1954)
- Utterly Until Death (1954)
- Lying at Death's Door (1956)
- Far Better Dead! (1957)
- Hate for Sale (1957)
- Out of This World (1958)
- Murmurs in the Rue Morgue (1959)
- Remains to Be Seen (1960)
- There Must Be Victims (1961)
- Watch Out! Saturnin Dax (1962)
- Postscript to a Death (1963)
- Hate Finds a Way (1964)
- The Dice Were Loaded (1965)
- It's Your Funeral (1966)
- No Feeling in Murder (1966)

=== As Kevin O'Hara ===
- The Customer's Always Wrong (1951)
- Exit and Curtain (1952)
- Sing, Clubman, Sing! (1952)
- Always Tell the Truth (1953)
- It Leaves Them Cold (1954)
- Keep Your Fingers Crossed (1955)
- The Pace That Kills (1955)
- Women Like to Know (1957)
- Danger: Women at Work! (1958)
- Well, I'll Be Hanged! (1958)
- And Here Is the Noose! (1959)
- Taking Life Easy (1961)
- If Anything Should Happen (1962)
- Do not Tell the Police (1963)
- Do not Neglect the Body (1964)
- It's Your Funeral (1966)
