= Ourselves Alone (film) =

1936 film

- DVD cover
- Directed by: Brian Desmond Hurst
- Written by: Dudley Lesley; Marjorie Deans; Denis Johnston; Philip MacDonald
- Starring: John Lodge; John Loder
- Cinematography: Walter J. Harvey; Brian Langley
- Edited by: James Corbett
- Music by: Harry Acres
- Distributed by: British International Pictures; Alliance Films
- Release date: 27 April 1936
- Running time: 68 minutes
- Country: United Kingdom
- Language: English

Ourselves Alone (released in the US as River of Unrest) is a 1936 British drama film depicting a love story set against the backdrop of the Irish War of Independence. The title is a translation of the Irish slogan Sinn Féin Amháin. It is directed by Brian Desmond Hurst and stars John Lodge, John Loder and Antoinette Cellier.

The film was banned in Northern Ireland under the Civil Authorities (Special Powers) Act (Northern Ireland) 1922, but was shown in the Irish Free State and in Great Britain.

== Synopsis ==
The film opens in 1921 with an IRA ambush of a police convoy carrying two captured members of the IRA. Irish Police Inspector Hannay and British Captain Wiltshire of the Royal Intelligence Corps are both in love with Maureen Elliot, a sister of the IRA leader. The IRA leader is subsequently shot by Wiltshire. Hannay realises that Maureen is in love with Wiltshire and, as a final gesture, takes the blame for shooting her brother himself. Maureen then helps Captain Wiltshire escape an IRA trap.

== Cast ==
- John Lodge as Inspector Hanney
- John Loder as Capt. Wiltshire
- Antoinette Cellier as Maureen Elliott
- Niall MacGinnis as Terence Elliott
- Clifford Evans as Commander Connolly
- Jerry Verno as Private Parsley
- Bruce Lester as 2nd Lt. Lingard
- Maire O'Neill as Nanny
- Tony Quinn as Maloney
- Paul Farrell as Hogan

== Reception ==
One of the earliest reviews (on 10 May 1936) identifies this film as director, Brian Desmond Hurst's breakthrough film, under the banner headline Hitchcock... Capra.... Desmond-Hurst " on B.I.P's "little heard of" 'Ourselves Alone' it states "Remarkably little publicity concerning this production has reached the public, but among those concerned in the business (this time I won't say 'racket') whispers have gone round, like they often do, that it would be worth watching. That whisper should become a shout."

A reviewer in the Irish Times (17 August 1936) under the heading 'Film of the year' stated "If there was any betting on film results I would like to have a little flutter on Ourselves Alone".

Novelist Graham Greene, then film reviewer for The Spectator, noted in July 1936 that this film had been favourably compared to The Informer (1935) by other critics, but dissented from this opinion himself. "One of the silliest pictures which even an English studio has yet managed to turn out", he wrote.

The film was voted the seventh best British movie of 1936.

== Books ==
Theirs is the Glory: Arnhem, Hurst and Conflict on Film takes Hurst's Battle of Arnhem epic as its centrepiece and then chronicles Hurst's life and experiences during the First World War and profiles each of his other nine films on conflict, including Ourselves Alone.
