= Betty Compton =

American actress (1904–1944)

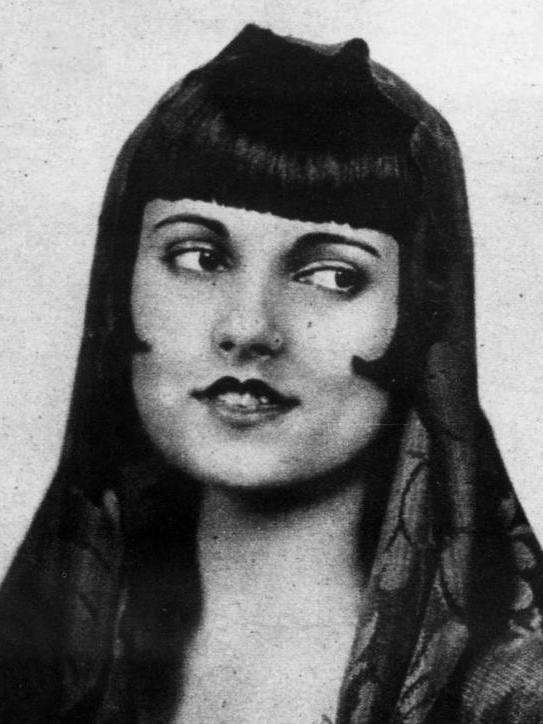
- Born: Violet Halling Compton; May 13, 1906; Sandown, Isle of Wight, England
- Died: July 12, 1944 (aged 38); Manhattan, New York City, U.S.
- Occupations: Stage, film actress
- Spouse(s): Edward D. Dowling (1931-1931, divorced); Jimmy Walker (1933-1941; divorced); Theodore Temple Knappen (1942-1944; her death)
- Children: 3

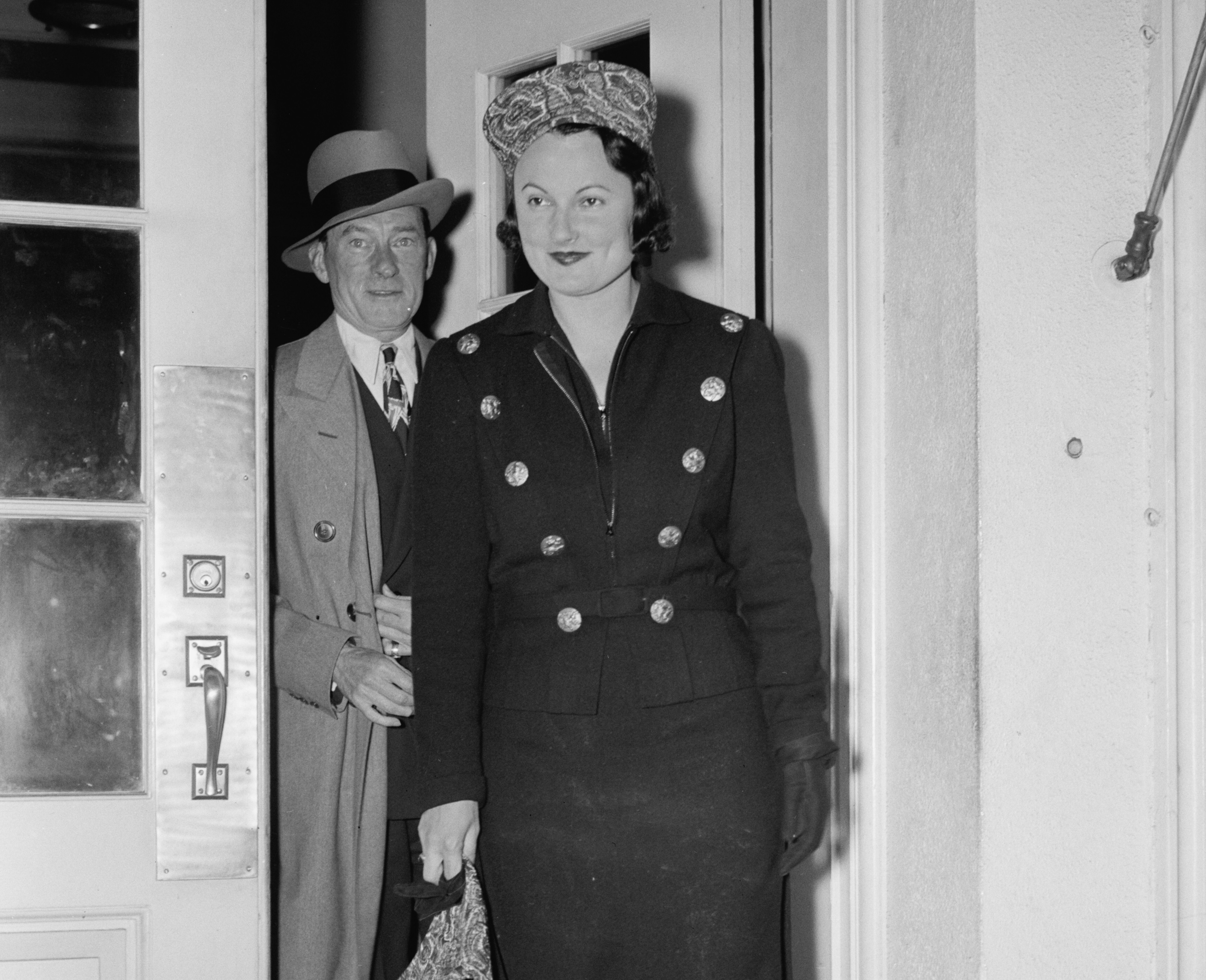
Compton and husband Jimmy Walker at the White House in 1938

Betty Compton (born Violet Halling Compton; May 13, 1906 – July 12, 1944) was an English actress and singer, who married New York City mayor Jimmy Walker in 1933.

Compton was born Violet Halling Compton in Sandown, Isle of Wight. She moved to Canada with her parents when she was seven years old. She studied singing in New York City with Estelle Liebling.

A member of the Ziegfeld Follies, she appeared in the original stage production of Funny Face (1927) alongside Fred Astaire and Adele Astaire, as well as Oh, Kay! in 1926.

Compton married film dialog director Edward D. Dowling on February 16, 1931, in Cuernavaca, Mexico, and they were divorced in that city on March 20, 1931. She had received a divorce from a previous marriage in 1923. She married Walker on April 18, 1933, in Cannes, France. She and Walker adopted a son, James J. Walker II, and a daughter, Mary Ann Walker. In 1940, Compton began divorce action against Walker. The divorce would become official on March 15, 1941 in Key West. On May 11, 1942, Compton married West Point graduate and consulting engineer Theodore Knappen in Jersey City. That was her fourth wedding. She and Knappen had a son, Theodore Compton Knappen. This would be the only child Compton would give birth to.

According to Knappen, Compton had been ill since the birth of their son on January 19, 1944. On July 12, 1944, Compton died in Doctors Hospital, New York, aged 38.

== Sources ==
- Isle of Wight Family History Society
