= Mervyn Johns filmography =

List of films featuring Mervyn Johns

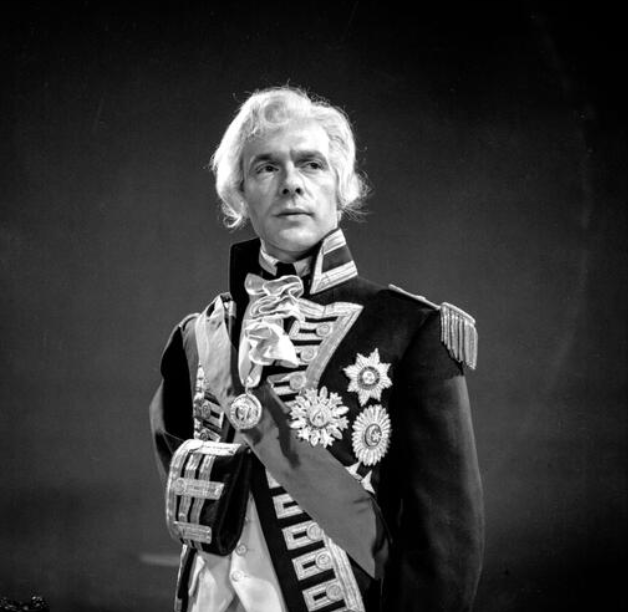
Johns in The Duke in Darkness in 1943

Mervyn Johns was a Welsh actor who appeared in 74 films, 32 television shows, and more than 23 plays across six decades on screen and stage. Johns made his theatrical debut while on tour of the British dominions in 1923 and his screen debut with Lady in Danger in 1934. He went on to become an indelible part of British wartime cinema with starring roles in Saloon Bar (1940), The Next of Kin (1942), Went the Day Well? (1942), The Halfway House (1944), Twilight Hour (1945), and Dead of Night (1945). In the postwar era, he worked regularly as a character actor at Ealing Studios, first with starring roles in They Knew Mr. Knight (1946), The Captive Heart (1946), Captain Boycott (1947), Easy Money (1948), and Scrooge (1951), and later guest appearances on televised plays and anthology series.

== Filmography ==
=== Film ===
Year	Title	Role	Director	Studio	Notes	Ref
1934	Lady in Danger	Reporter	Tom Walls	Gaumont-British	Film debut	
1935	The Tunnel	—	Maurice Elvey	Gaumont-British		
1935	The Guv'nor	Bank director	Milton Rosmer	Gaumont-British		
1935	Foreign Affaires	Courtroom interpreter	Tom Walls	Gainsborough Pictures		
1936	Pot Luck	Night watchman	Tom Walls	Gainsborough Pictures		
1936	In the Soup	Meakin	Henry Edwards	Julius Hagen Productions		
1936	Everything Is Thunder	Karl (waiter)	Milton Rosmer	Gaumont-British		
1936	Dishonour Bright	French postcard seller	Tom Walls	General Film Distributors		
1937	Song of the Forge	—	Henry Edwards	Butcher's Film Service		
1937	Storm in a Teacup	Court bailiff	Ian Dalrymple; Victor Saville	London Films		
1937	Night Ride	Trapped miner	John Paddy Carstairs	British and Dominions Imperial Studios		
1937	The Last Curtain	Hemp	David MacDonald	British and Dominions Imperial Studios		
1938	Almost a Gentleman	Percival Clicker	Oswald Mitchell	Butcher's Film Service		
1939	Jamaica Inn	Thomas	Alfred Hitchcock	Mayflower Pictures		
1940	The Midas Touch	—	David MacDonald	Warner Brothers		
1940	Convoy	—	Pen Tennyson	Ealing Studios		
1940	The Girl in the News	James Fetherwood	Carol Reed	Twentieth Century Productions		
1940	Saloon Bar	Charlie Wickers	Walter Forde	Ealing Studios		
1942	The Next of Kin	Mr Davis (No 23)	Thorold Dickinson	Ealing Studios		
1942	The Foreman Went to France	Passport official	Charles Frend	Ealing Studios		
1942	Went the Day Well?	Charlie Sims	Alberto Cavalcanti	Ealing Studios		
1943	The Bells Go Down	Sam	Basil Dearden	Ealing Studios		
1943	My Learned Friend	Arthur Grimshaw	Basil Dearden	Ealing Studios		
1943	San Demetrio London	John Boyle	Charles Frend; Robert Hamer	Ealing Studios		
1944	The Halfway House	Rhys	Basil Dearden	Ealing Studios		
1945	Twilight Hour	Major John Roberts	Paul L. Stein	British National Films Company		
1945	Dead of Night	Walter Craig	Alberto Cavalcanti; Charles Crichton; Robert Hamer; Basil Dearden	Ealing Studios		
1945	Pink String and Sealing Wax	Edward Sutton	Robert Hamer	Ealing Studios		
1946	They Knew Mr. Knight	Tom Blake	Norman Walker	General Film Distributors		
1946	The Captive Heart	Evans	Basil Dearden	Ealing Studios		
1947	Captain Boycott	Watty Connell	Frank Launder	Individual Pictures		
1948	Easy Money	Herbert Atkins	Bernard Knowles	Gainsborough Pictures		
1948	Counterblast	Dr. Bruckner (the Beast of Ravensbruck)	Paul L. Stein	British National Films Company		
1948	Quartet	Samuel Sunbury	Ken Annakin; Arthur Crabtree; Harold French; Ralph Smart	Gainsborough Pictures; J. Arthur Rank Productions	Segment: The Kite	
1949	Edward, My Son	Harry Sempkin	George Cukor	MGM-British Studios		
1949	Helter Skelter	Ernest Bennett	Ralph Thomas	Gainsborough Pictures		
1949	Diamond City	Hart	David MacDonald	Gainsborough Pictures		
1950	Tony Draws a Horse	Alfred Parsons	John Paddy Carstairs	Pinnacle Productions		
1951	Scrooge	Bob Cratchit	Brian Desmond Hurst	George Minter Productions		
1951	The Magic Box	Goitz	John Boulting	British Lion Films		
1952	The Tall Headlines	Uncle Ted	Terence Young	Raymond Stross Productions		
1953	The Oracle	Tom Mitchum	C. M. Pennington-Richards	Group 3 Films		
1953	Valley of Song	Minister Idris Griffiths	Gilbert Gunn	Associated British Picture Corporation		
1953	The Master of Ballantrae	MacKellar	William Keighley	Warner Brothers		
1954	Romeo and Juliet	Friar Laurence	Renato Castellani	Universalcine; Verona Produzione		
1955	The Blue Peter	Captain Snow	Wolf Rilla	Group 3 Films; Beaconsfield Productions		
1956	1984	Jones	Michael Anderson	Holiday Film Productions		
1956	The Intimate Stranger	Ernest Chaple	Alec C. Snowden	Anglo-Guild Productions; Merton Park Studios		
1956	Moby Dick	Peleg	John Huston	Moulin Productions		
1956	Find the Lady	Mr. Hurst	Charles Saunders	Major Productions; Act Productions		
1957	The Counterfeit Plan	Louie Bernard	Montgomery Tully	Amalgamated Productions		
1957	Doctor at Large	Smith	Ralph Thomas	The Rank Organisation		
1957	The Vicious Circle	Dr. George Kimber	Gerald Thomas	Beaconsfield Productions		
1957	The Surgeon's Knife	Mr. Waring	Gordon Parry	Gibraltar Films		
1957	Danger List	Graham Ellis	Leslie Arliss	Hammer Film Productions	Short film	
1958	The Gypsy and the Gentleman	Brook	Joseph Losey	The Rank Organisation		
1959	The Devil's Disciple	Rev. Maindeck Parshotter	Guy Hamilton	Hecht-Hill-Lancaster Films; Bryna Productions		
1960	Once More, with Feeling!	Mr. Wilbur Jr.	Stanley Donen	Columbia Pictures		
1960	Never Let Go	Alfie Barnes	John Guillermin	Independent Artists		
1960	The Sundowners	Jack Patchogue (Mayor of Cawndilla)	Fred Zinnemann	Warner Brothers		
1961	No Love for Johnnie	Charlie Young	Ralph Thomas	Five Star		
1961	The Rebel	Manager of art gallery	Robert Day	Associated British Picture Corporation		
1961	Francis of Assisi	Brother Juniper	Michael Curtiz	Perseus Productions		
1963	The Day of the Triffids	Mr. Coker	Steve Sekely; Freddie Francis	Security Pictures		
1963	55 Days at Peking	Clergyman	Nicholas Ray	Samuel Bronston Productions		
1963	80,000 Suspects	Buckridge	Val Guest	Val Guest Productions		
1963	The Old Dark House	Potiphar Femm	William Castle	William Castle Productions; Hammer Film Productions		
1963	The Victors	Dennis	Carl Foreman	Open Road Films; Highroad Productions		
1964	A Jolly Bad Fellow	Willie Pugh-Smith	Don Chaffey	Pax Films		
1965	The Heroes of Telemark	Col. Wilkinson	Anthony Mann	Benton Film Productions		
1966	Who Killed the Cat?	Henry Fawcett	Montgomery Tully	Eternal Films		
1973	The National Health	Rees	Jack Gold	Virgin Films		
1976	House of Mortal Sin	Father Duggan	Pete Walker	Pete Walker (Heritage)	Final film	

=== Television ===
Year	Title	Role	Director	Network	Notes	Ref
1938	Pride and Prejudice	Sir Wilfred Lucas	—	BBC Television	Television film	
1950–1957	BBC Sunday Night Theatre	Harold Simpson; Albert Eccles; Samuel Pepys; Rough; His Excellency the Governor	—	BBC Television	5 episodes	
1955–1961	ITV Television Playhouse	Walter Turnbull; Wickers; Jan Konigsveldt; Jack Wilson; Frank Davidson; Sylvan Humphreys	Antony Kearey; Herbert Wise; Cyril Butcher; Ronald Marriott; Rosemary Hill; Toby Robertson	Associated-Rediffusion	7 episodes	
1956	New Ramps for Old	J. Philimore Sparkes	—	BBC Television	6 episodes	
1956–1964	ITV Play of the Week	Caspar Darde; Rev. Arthur Mottram; Doctor Evans; Eli	David Boisseau; Philip Saville; Warren Tute; David Boisseau	Granada Television	4 episodes	
1957	A Tale of Two Cities	Mr. Jarvis Lorry	—	BBC Television	Television mini series 7 episodes	
1958	White Hunter	Mr. Doak	Max Varnel; Joseph Sterling	Telestar Productions	2 episodes	
1958	Leave It to Todhunter	Lawrence Todhunter	Andrew Osborn	BBC Television	6 episodes	
1959	Knight Errant Limited	Harry Smith	Stuart Latham	Granada Television	Episode: He Fell Among Thieves	
1960	Boyd Q.C.	John Parsons	Michael Currer-Briggs	Associated-Rediffusion	Episode: The Little Man	
1962	Probation Officer	Mr. Todd	Geoffrey Stephenson	Associated Television		
1962	Maigret	Inspector Fumel	Terence Williams	BBC Television	Episode: The Amateurs	
1962	The Keep	Ben Morton	John Dexter	BBC Television	Television film	
1963	The Third Man	Geoffrey Ormsby	David MacDonald	BBC Television; Prestige Productions; National Telefilm Associates	Episode: A King's Ransom	
1964	Detective	Father Brown	Gilchrist Calder	BBC Television	Episode: The Quick One	
1964	No Hiding Place	Alf Turnball	Cyril Coke	Associated-Rediffusion	Episode: Hanging by a Thread	
1964	Danger Man	Armstrong	Don Chaffey	Incorporated Television Company	Episode: No Marks for Servility	
1965	The Sullavan Brothers	Benjamin Greenfield	Philip Dale	Associated Television	Episode: You Can't Win	
1965	Knock on Any Door	Mr. Prubright	Graham Evans	Associated Television	Episode: Close Season	
1965	The Avengers	Brandon Storey	Roy Ward Baker	ABC Weekend Television	Episode: Too Many Christmas Trees	
1965–1966	Pardon the Expression	Jacob Elijah Burgess; Jeb	Wally Butler; Michael Cox	Granada Television	2 episodes	
1966	The Saint	Doctor Davis	Roger Moore	Bamore; Incorporated Television Company	Episode: The House on Dragon's Rock	
1972	Kate	Mr. Norris	Paul Annett	Yorkshire Television	Episode: People Depend on You	
1972	The Adventurer	Franz Kolmar	Val Guest	Incorporated Television Company	Episode: Deadlock	
1972	Dixon of Dock Green	Mr. Farmer	Vere Lorrimer	BBC Television	Episode: The Fingerman	
1972	The Strauss Family	Doctor Sarner	David Giles	Associated Television	Television mini series Episode: Josef	
1973	The Adventures of Black Beauty	Silas Surtees	Gerry Poulson	The Fremantle Corporation; London Weekend Television; Talbot Television	Episode: The Medicine Man	
1973	Thinking Man As Hero	Lord Beale	John Glenister	BBC Television	Television film	
1973–1975	Crown Court	Arthur Charles Parfitt; Edward Lumsden	June Wyndham Davies; Roger Tucker	Granada Television	5 episodes	
1974	QB VII	Mr. Evans	Tom Gries	Douglas S. Cramer Company; Screen Gems	Television mini series	
1977	Kilvert's Diary	James Jones	Peter Hammond	BBC Television	Episode: An Angel Satyr Walks These Hills	
1977–1979	The New Avengers	Elderly man	Ray Austin	The Avengers Enterprises; TV Productions; IDTV Production	Episode: Medium Rare	
1979	Shoestring	Reverend James Appleby	Roger Tucker	BBC Television	Episode: Knock for Knock	

== Stage appearances ==
Year	Title	Role	Director	Theatre	Notes	Ref
1924	London's Grand Guignol	Mr Trant	Lewis Casson	Comedy Theatre	West End debut	
1926	Sons and Fathers	Mr Mingan	Milton Rosmer	Royal Academy of Dramatic Art		
1931–1932	The Ghost Train	Teddy Deakin	Ralph Hutton	Little Theatre		
1931–1932	When Knights Were Bold	Sir Guy De Vere	Alfred Brooks	Little Theatre		
1931–1932	A Cup of Kindness	—	Ralph Hutton	Little Theatre		
1932	Bird In Hand	Mr Blanquet	Ralph Hutton	Little Theatre		
1932–1933	The Rivals	—	Alfred Brooks	Little Theatre		
1932–1933	Saint Joan	—	—	Little Theatre		
1934–1935	Hyde Park Corner	Magistrate's Clerk	Thomas Reynolds	Apollo Theatre		
1937–1938	Time and the Conways	Ernest Beevers	Irene Hentschel	Duchess Theatre		
1938	Comedienne	Ted Jones	Murray Macdonald	Aldwych Theatre		
1939	The Doctor's Dilemma	Sir Patrick Cullen	John Fernald	Westminster Theatre; Whitehall Theatre		
1939–1940	Saloon Bar	Wickers	Richard Bird	Wyndham's Theatre		
1940–1941	Once a Crook	Hallelujah Harry	Richard Bird	Aldwych Theatre; New Theatre		
1942–1943	The Duke in Darkness	—	Michael Redgrave	Bristol Hippodrome		
1943	Heartbreak House	Captain Shotover	John Burrell	Cambridge Theatre		
1949	Tobacco Road	Jeeter Lester	Robert Henderson	Embassy Theatren; Royal Central School of Speech and Drama; Playhouse Theatre		
1949	Love's a Funny Thing	Michael Norbury	—	Ambassadors Theatre		
1950	Deadlock	George	Peter Dearing	Prince of Wales Theatre		
1951	The Martins' Nest	Harold Martin	André van Gyseghem	Westminster Theatre		
1951	Heloise	Fulbert	Michael Powell	Duke of York's Theatre		
1952	The Mortimer Touch	Shurie	George Devine	Duke of York's Theatre		
1956	Strange Request	George Green	Joan Swinstead	New Theatre Oxford		
1961	The Keep	Ben Morton	John Dexter	Royal Court Theatre		
1964–1965	Heirs and Graces	Mr Withers	Moray Watson	Theatre Royal		
1971–1972	A Christmas Carol	Bob Cratchit	—	Theatre Royal		
