= Seagulls Over Sorrento (TV play) =

1960 Australian television play

- Genre: war
- Based on: play Seagulls Over Sorrento by Hugh Hastings
- Written by: Dennis Webb
- Directed by: Alf Potter
- Country of origin: Australia
- Original language: English

Production
- Producer: Dorothy Crawford
- Running time: 90 mins
- Production company: Crawfords
- Budget: £3,500

Original release
- Release: 27 March 1960 (Melbourne)
- Release: 12 June 1960 (Sydney)

Seagulls Over Sorrento is a 1960 Australian television play. It was based on the popular stage play Seagulls Over Sorrento and was produced by Crawford Productions for Melbourne's HSV-7, airing on 1 May 1960 as an episode of "ACI Theatre". It screened on TCN-9 in Sydney on Sunday 12 June.

It was the first full-length TV play made by an independent production company in Australia.

A kinescope recording of the production exists. It was an early depiction of homosexuality in Australian television drama.

== Cast ==
- Bill Hodge as Badger
- Brian James as Petty Officer Herbert
- Stuart Wagstaff
- Frank Taylor as AB Haggis MacIntosh
- Peter Anderson as Lofty
- Carl Bleazby
- Don Crosby as AB Hudson
- Mark Kelly
- John Norman

== Production ==
It was the second time live drama had appeared on HSV-7. The first was The Caine Mutiny Court Martial.

Hodge, James, Taylor and Bleazby had appeared in the 1952 J. C. Williamson's production of the play. Hodge came out of semi retirement to star. It was reportedly the 594th time he had played the part.

The adaptation of the play was more faithful to its source material than the 1954 film version.

== Reception ==
A critic from the Sydney Morning Herald "thought it came off pretty well as a TV show" with an "excellent cast".

The critic from The Age said "it was adequately presented but lacked atmosphere. The players were scared of the TV cameras for the first half hour."
