= Double Alibi =

Double Alibi may refer to:

- Double Alibi (1937 film), a British crime film
- Double Alibi (1940 film), an American crime film
