= Hugh Hastings (playwright) =

Australian writer (1917–2004)

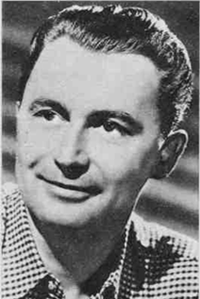
Hugh Williams, 1953

Hugh Hastings (31 January 1917 – 26 November 2004) was an Australian writer best known for his play Seagulls Over Sorrento. He moved to England in 1936 determined to break into theatre as an actor or writer. He served in the British Royal Navy for over five years during World War II.

== Life ==
Born Hugh Williamson, Hastings left Australia in 1936 to work in the British film industry.

Hastings's play Seagulls Over Sorrento made theatre history by running for 1,551 performances at London's Apollo Theatre. Only two other plays had then run longer in theatre history: Noël Coward's Blithe Spirit; and R. F. Delderfield's Worm's Eye View.

Part of the play's appeal was that it was radical for the time. The play was set inside a Royal Navy research station near Scapa Flow. The play was not popular with everyone, and not everyone saw the humor in it. It elicited subdued laughs as well as frowns, depending on whether the audience was liberal or conservative.

He estimated he made £50,000 from Sorrento. The fortune grew to £100,000 when in 1954 a film version made by the Boulting brothers was released.

Hastings has an uncredited movie role in the 1952 film Gift Horse, on which he worked on the script. Hastings also wrote the dialogues for a Marghanita Laski melodrama, It Started in Paradise (1952). He also wrote another naval play, Red Dragon, based on the 1949 Yangtze Incident, which involved HMS Amethyst. The play failed to make an impression. None of his other works reached the success levels of Sorrento. Even different versions of his most famous work failed to succeed. The television version of Sorrento was broadcast in 1960 with no real impact. He also financed and wrote a musical version, entitled Scapa, which ran for a few weeks at the Adelphi Theatre in 1962.

== Select credits ==
- The Quadrille (1936) – play
- Seagulls Over Sorrento (1950) – play
- Red Dragon (1950) – based on the Amethyst Incident
- Inner Circle (1952) – play
- Glory at Sea (1952) – screenplay
- A Touch of the Sun (1952) – play
- Pink Elephants (1955) – play
- Blood Orange (1958) – play
- Scapa! (1962) – book for musical
- The Green Carnation (1973)
