= Almost a Gentleman =

Almost a Gentleman may refer to:

- Almost a Gentleman (1938 film), a 1938 British comedy film directed by Oswald Mitchell
- Almost a Gentleman (1939 film), a 1939 American drama film directed by Leslie Goodwins
