= Frank Taylor (actor) =

Australian actor

- Born: Francis Hewat Taylor; 22 February 1921; Kirkhill, Coldingham, Berwickshire, Scotland
- Died: 28 July 2004 (aged 83); Sydney, New South Wales, Australia
- Education: Edinburgh Academy
- Alma mater: Scottish School of Drama
- Occupation: Actor
- Years active: 1938-1980s
- Spouse: Pauline Taylor (née Larcombe)
- Children: 2 daughters

Francis Hewat Taylor (22 February 1921 – 28 July 2004) was a Scottish-born Australian actor and voice artist known for his long running portrayal of Sgt. Andrew "Scotty" Macleod in the television series Division 4. He appeared in every one of the show's 301 episodes becoming a well known television personality.

== Early life and military service ==
Taylor was born in Kirkhill, Berwickshire, Scotland in 1921 and was educated at the Edinburgh Academy and the Scottish School of Drama. His professional debut as an actor was as the Second Page in Richard of Bordeaux at the Lyceum Theatre, Edinburgh, in September 1938.

During World War II Taylor joined the Royal Air Force and served for five years as a Wireless operator and Air gunner with Squadron 608 and Squadron 217. He was shot down and taken as a prisoner in February 1942 and was incarcerated in seven Prisoner of war camps, before being liberated on 2 May 1945 by the British 2nd Army 11th Armoured Division.

== Australian acting career ==
=== Theatre ===
Taylor settled permanently in Sydney in 1952. He appeared in productions of plays by Shakespeare and Brendan Behan and contemporary drama productions, including Henry V, The Hostage and Difference of Opinion and for the Old Tote Theatre Company in Berthold Brechts The Caucasian Chalk Circle and George Bernard Shaw's Heartbreak House. He appeared in Under Milk Wood by Dylan Thomas at the Independent Theatre in North Sydney.

=== Television and film ===
Taylor played Wilson in the 1960 film The Sundowners.

Taylor appeared in the Australian television play Seagulls Over Sorrento in 1960. It was based on the popular stage play Seagulls Over Sorrento and was produced by Crawford Productions for Melbourne's HSV-7, airing as an episode of ACI Theatre and a televised production of The Affair in 1965. It screened on TCN-9 in Sydney on Sunday 12 June. In 1966 he appeared in the popular Australian situation comedy series My Name's McGooley, What's Yours? on the Seven Network (station ATN7). Later he also appeared in many of the early landmark television series in Australia before being cast in Crawford Productions police series Division 4. Taylor read and recorded over 400 books for the Royal Blind Society of NSW audio book collection. He retired in the late 1980s.

== Awards ==
In 1972 Taylor received the Penguin Award for the Best Supporting Actor in a Television Series.

== Autobiography and personal life ==
Taylor wrote an autobiography entitled Barbed Wire and Footlights – Seven Stalags to Freedom, published in 1988.

Taylor married the Sydney-born zoologist Pauline Gladys Larcombe in 1954. The couple had two daughters, Marjorie and Gillian, and lived in the substantial Victorian era home Hazelhurst at 15 Ethel Street, Burwood, New South Wales. Pauline Taylor was the daughter of Sydney accountant William Frederick Arthur Larcombe who was educated at The King's School, Parramatta. His English-born wife Amy Gladys Larcombe (née Shawe) lived next door to the Taylor family in the heritage listed home Landsdowne and the two houses and tennis court, on multiple blocks of land, formed a family compound for over 50 years. Before going up to the University of Sydney Pauline Larcombe attended Meriden School in Strathfield. She was the niece of James Paul Larcombe who like her father was an accountant. He lived in Strathfield in the Georgian-revival style home Somerset on The Boulevarde. The house was designed for him by the acclaimed architect B. J. Waterhouse. As a widow his wife Dorothy Larcombe became Lady Joske when she married Sir Percy Joske who moved to Sydney and to her home in Strathfield. Frank Taylor died in 2004 survived by his wife and two daughters. His widow Pauline died in 2011.
