= Anna Konstam =

British actress (1914–1982)

- Warner Bros. publicity still, 1939
- Born: 22 February 1914; London, England
- Died: 21 November 1982 (aged 68)
- Occupation: Actress
- Years active: 1937–1972
- Relatives: Phyllis Konstam (sister)

Anna Konstam (22 February 1914 – 21 November 1982) was a British theatre and film actress.

She appeared in the comedy Love in a Mist at St Martin's Theatre in 1941. She also played roles at Stratford in 1942–43, including Desdemona in Othello, Olivia in Twelfth Night and Hermione in The Winter's Tale.

== Partial filmography ==
- Young and Innocent (1937) - Elsie - Bathing Girl (uncredited)
- They Drive by Night (1938) - Molly O'Neill
- Too Dangerous to Live (1939) - Lou
- The Midas Touch (1940) - Mamie
- Saloon Bar (1940) - Ivy
- Waterloo Road (1945) - May
- All the Advantages (1972) - (final film role)

== Selected theatre appearances ==
- The Last Straw by Reginald Denham (1937)
- Saloon Bar by Frank Harvey (1939)
- Love in a Mist by Kenneth Horne (1941)
