= Operation Malaya (film) =

1953 film by David MacDonald

- Film poster
- Directed by: David MacDonald
- Written by: John Croydon; David MacDonald
- Produced by: John Croydon; Peter Crane executive Herman Cohen (US version)
- Narrated by: Chips Rafferty; John Humphrey; John Slater; Wynford Vaughan-Thomas
- Cinematography: Geoffrey Faithful
- Edited by: Inman Hunter
- Production companies: David MacDonald Productions Ltd; Abtcon Pictures
- Distributed by: American Releasing Corporation (US)
- Release dates: August 1953 (Edinburgh Festival); 17 September 1953 (United Kingdom); 1955 (USA)
- Running time: 77 minutes (UK); 67 minutes (US)
- Country: United Kingdom
- Language: English

Operation Malaya is a 1953 British documentary about the actions of British troops during the Malayan Emergency.

It was also known as Terror in the Jungle.

== Plot ==
The film portrays the actions of British and Commonwealth troops against Communist insurgents in Malaya, focusing around the tracking down of a group of communists who killed a rubber planter. Scenes included:

- Sir Gerald Templer thanking troops
- a patrol of armoured cars ambushed by terrorists
- Singapore
- history of the communist insurrection
- a journalist traveling through Kuala Lumpur
- a military patrol finding a communist camp
- a look at a squatting community which is removed to a resettlement area (known as "new villages")
- the role of the Malayan Navy and Air Force.

== Production ==
David MacDonald had previously made a documentary movie about World War II, Desert Victory. He approached the Colonial Office for money to help make a similar movie about the Malayan Emergency but was refused by Sir Gerald Templer on the grounds it was a commercial venture. Instead MacDonald obtained commercial funding from Sir Alex Korda.

The film mixed genuine documentary footage with dramatic re-enactments of real life incidents. The voices of professional actors were used, including Chips Rafferty. The film was shot partly in Merton Park Studios.

== Release ==
The film debuted at the Edinburgh Festival but struggled to find commercial distribution in England. The Manchester Guardian called it "an honest-to-goodness attempt to describe the course of politico-military events in post-war Malaya" but "it often looks and sounds quite unnecessarily bogus." C. A. Lejeune of the Observer thought the film was less effective than David MacDonald's earlier Desert Victory because of all the "reconstructed school of documentary" scenes but did succeed as "a picture of hard work and good soldiering gradually overcoming the fears of the native population, the incredibly difficult terrain, and a relentless enemy shielded by the jungle."

== US release ==
American rights to the film were bought by the American Releasing Corporation, the forerunner of American International Pictures in 1955. It was one of the first movies released by that company. Herman Cohen was credited as producer for this version.
