= Saloon Bar =

1940 British film by Walter Forde

- Directed by: Walter Forde
- Written by: John Dighton; Angus MacPhail
- Based on: Saloon Bar by Frank Harvey
- Produced by: Michael Balcon; Culley Forde
- Starring: Gordon Harker; Elizabeth Allan; Mervyn Johns
- Cinematography: Ronald Neame
- Edited by: Ray Pitt
- Music by: Ernest Irving
- Production company: Ealing Studios
- Distributed by: Associated British Film Distributors
- Release date: November 2, 1940
- Running time: 76 minutes
- Country: United Kingdom
- Language: English

Saloon Bar is a 1940 British comedy thriller film directed by Walter Forde and starring Gordon Harker, Elizabeth Allan and Mervyn Johns. It was made by Ealing Studios and its style has led to comparisons with the later Ealing Comedies, unlike other wartime Ealing films which are different in tone. It is based on the 1939 play of the same name by Frank Harvey in which Harker had also starred. An amateur detective tries to clear an innocent man of a crime before the date of his execution.

== Plot ==
The action takes place in London over one evening in the saloon bar of the Cap & Bells pub, just before Christmas. The regulars discuss the forthcoming execution for robbery and murder of the boyfriend of one of the barmaids. A pound note from the robbery is found in the till. Convinced of the condemned man's innocence, and led by bookie Joe Harris, they trace how the note came to be there and unmask the true killer.

== Cast ==
- Gordon Harker as Joe Harris
- Elizabeth Allan as Queenie
- Mervyn Johns as Wickers
- Joyce Barbour as Sally
- Anna Konstam as Ivy
- Cyril Raymond as Harry Small
- Judy Campbell as Doris
- Al Millen as Fred
- Norman Pierce as Bill Hoskins
- Alec Clunes as Eddie Graves
- Mavis Villiers as Joan
- Felix Aylmer as Mayor
- O. B. Clarence as Sir Archibald
- Aubrey Dexter as Major
- Helena Pickard as Mrs Small
- Manning Whiley as evangelist
- Laurence Kitchin as Peter
- Roddy Hughes as doctor
- Gordon James as Jim
- Annie Esmond as Mrs. Truscott
- Eliot Makeham as meek man
- Roddy McDowall as boy
- Julie Suedo as Eleanor
- Torin Thatcher as Mr. Garrod

== Production ==
The film's sets were designed by the art director Wilfred Shingleton.

== Critical reception ==
Kine Weekly said "Gordon Harker is the chief spokesman and has never been in better form; neither has the well-chosen supporting cast. The direction, too, reveals no little resource. What action there is, is not only well timed, but contributes to an exciting climax. As for the "pub" atmosphere, it will warm the heart of every man and, maybe, every woman. In all, a capital and refreshingly English novelty thriller."

In British Sound Films: The Studio Years 1928–1959 David Quinlan rated the film as "good", writing: "Verbose but winning mixture of mystery and comedy, with nice pub atmosphere."

The Radio Times Guide to Films gave the film 3/5 stars, writing: "Gordon Harker was a familiar face in British thrillers during the 1930s, his mournful expression and throaty cockney accent enabled him to play characters on either side of the law. In this engaging Ealing whodunnit, he has a fine old time as a bookie playing detective in his local. Director Walter Forde makes effective use of the claustrophobic set to build tension, and he is well served by an efficient cast of suspects."

Leslie Halliwell said: "Amusing, well-made little suspenser from a West End success."
