= Tunisian Victory =

1944 film by Frank Capra, John Huston, Hugh Stewart

- Directed by: Frank Capra; Hugh Stewart; Roy Boulting; John Huston; Anthony Veiller
- Starring: Leo Genn (narrator); Burgess Meredith; Bernard Miles
- Edited by: Frank Clarke
- Music by: William Alwyn; Dimitri Tiomkin
- Distributed by: Butchers Film Distributors (UK); MGM (US)
- Release date: March 16, 1944
- Running time: 75 minutes
- Countries: United Kingdom; United States
- Language: English

Tunisian Victory is a 1944 Anglo-American war propaganda film about the victories in the North Africa Campaign of World War II.

The film follows both armies from the planning of Operation Torch and Operation Acrobat (the latter of which was canceled), to the liberation of Tunis. Interspersed in the documentary format are the narrative voices of supposed American and British soldiers (voiced by Burgess Meredith and Bernard Miles respectively), recounting their experience in the campaign. Miles and Meredith, playing the roles of soldiers, talk separately until the end of the film when they have a dialogue, agree to co-operate after the end of the war, and with the other Allied nations create a more just and peaceful post-war order.

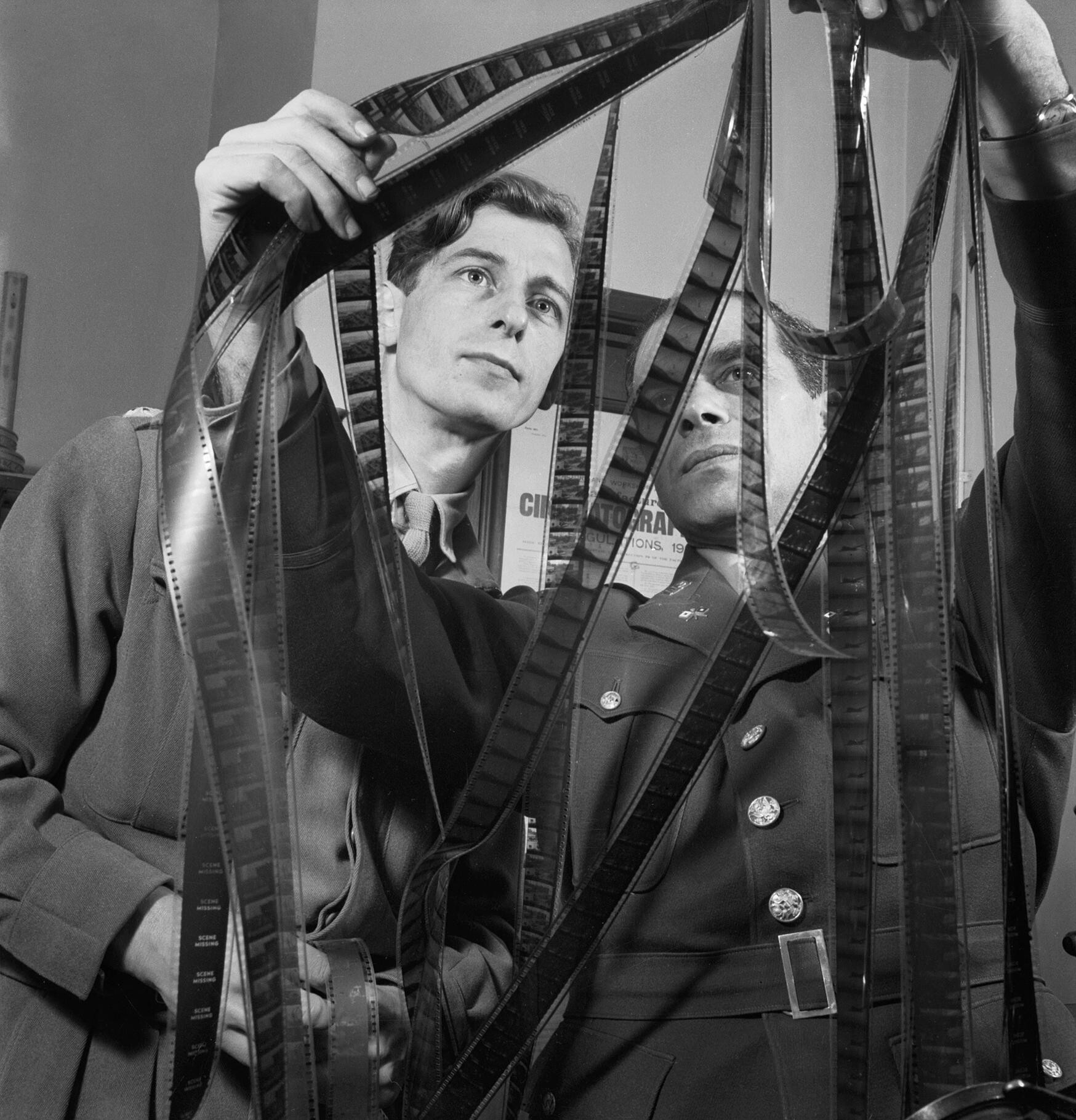
Colonel Frank Capra (right) confers with Captain Roy Boulting of the British Army Film Unit on the editing of the film in February 1944.

Tunisian Victory (complete film)

The film was intended as a follow-up to the successful British documentary film Desert Victory (1943). Frederic Krome's article "Tunisian Victory" and Anglo-American Film Propaganda in World War II from The Historian details the acrimony between the British and US film makers on the project. Most of the actual American combat footage taken during Operation Torch was destroyed when the ship carrying it was sunk, requiring many "battle scenes" to be reshot in the U.S. by director John Huston. Huston restaged several battles and liberations to achieve high quality footage, even going so far as to film some air battle scenes (in the Mohave Desert) and in Orlando, Florida. The British recognized the dubious nature of the film, though they themselves were guilty of the same recreations in wartime propaganda films.

The direction of the final version involved no less than five individuals: Frank Capra, John Huston, Anthony Veiller, Hugh Stewart and Roy Boulting.

== Reception ==
Critic James Agee writing in The Nation in 1944 compared it to Desert Victory: "That it suffers by comparison is by no means entirely the fault of the Englishmen and Americans who made it. Desert Victory started with great advantages ... Tunisian Victory had to tell of a campaign much more complex, in political as well as military respects; it was apparently necessary to highlight, and bow and scrape to every half-sized military wig in sight; the film suffered the liabilities of "full collaboration"; it evidently suffered too at the hands of people whose concern was purely political and propagandistic ... "

== See also ==
- List of Allied propaganda films of World War II
- The True Glory (1945)
- Army Film and Photographic Unit
