= Make It Three =

- Directed by: David MacDonald
- Written by: Vernon Sylvaine
- Produced by: Julius Hagen
- Starring: Hugh Wakefield; Edmund Willard; Diana Beaumont
- Production company: St. Margaret's Films
- Distributed by: Metro-Goldwyn-Mayer
- Release date: 1938
- Country: United Kingdom
- Language: English

Make It Three is a 1938 British comedy film directed by David MacDonald and starring Hugh Wakefield, Edmund Willard and Diana Beaumont. It was written by Vernon Sylvaine.

The screenplay concerns a bank clerk who is left a very large inheritance on condition that he first serve three months in prison. It was the last film produced by Julius Hagen who had owned Twickenham Studios. The film was a quota quickie, made for release by MGM.

== Preservation status ==
The British Film Institute National Archive holds a collection of ephemera but no film or video materials.

== Plot ==
Timid bank clerk Percy Higgin is left a fortune, but it comes with a catch: he must serve a prison sentence of exactly three months, no more, no less. He seeks guidance from former convict Big Ed who, coincidentally, is planning a heist at Higgin's bank. The robbery goes off as planned, and both men are caught and go to jail. However, two complications threaten Higgin's inheritance. First, his fiancée issues an ultimatum, declaring their engagement over unless they are married within the same three months Higgin is in jail. Second, his aggressive cellmate forces him into a prison break, putting his three-month timeline in jeopardy. Naturally, by the end of the story, both of these hurdles are overcome.

== Cast ==
- Hugh Wakefield as Percy Higgin
- Edmund Willard as Big Ed
- Diana Beaumont as Annie
- Sydney Fairbrother as Aunt Aggie
- Jack Hobbs as Charlie
- Olive Sloane as Kate
- Alexander Field as Sam
- C. Denier Warren as Cackleberry

== Reception ==
The Monthly Film Bulletin wrote: "This story is obviously totally deficient in either conviction or suspense, but it does lead to a number of comedy situations of a purely farcical nature. The director has made little attempt to enliven the story, preferring only to complete it with the minimum fuss, and (one supposes) in the minimum time. Settings, photography and sound are shoddy. Hugh Wakefield works valiantly in a vain endeavour to keep the story on the plane of comedy rather than of farce, but the direction and the minor characters persistently defeat this worthy intention. Sydney Fairbrother gives an efficient performance as the clerk's puritanical aunt."

The Daily Film Renter wrote: "Main development is taken up by broadly farcical burlesque of prison life, proceedings culminating in wedding behind bars. Hugh Wakefield plays lead in suitable vein. Taken in right spirit may prove amusing fare for appropriate audiences."

Kine Weekly wrote: "An alleged prison burlesque, this British comedy so bores with its childish travesty that to sit through it is to equal a long stretch. Hugh Wakefield, Edmund Willard and Diana Beaumont are the stars, but they merely move one to pity for the waste of their undoubted gifts ... Definitely not recommended"
