= Desert Victory =

1943 British film by Roy Boulting

- Directed by: Roy Boulting
- Written by: James Lansdale Hodson
- Produced by: David MacDonald
- Production companies: Army Film and Photographic Unit; Royal Air Force Film Production Unit
- Distributed by: Ministry of Information (United Kingdom); 20th Century Fox (United States)
- Release date: March 1943
- Running time: 60 minutes
- Country: United Kingdom
- Language: English
- Box office: £77,250

Desert Victory is a 1943 documentary film produced by the British Ministry of Information, documenting the Allies' North African campaign against Field Marshal Erwin Rommel and the Afrika Korps. This documentary traces the struggle between General Erwin Rommel and Field Marshal Bernard Montgomery, from German and Italian defeats at El Alamein to Tripoli. The film was produced by David MacDonald and directed by Roy Boulting who also directed Tunisian Victory and Burma Victory. Like the famous "Why We Fight" series of films by Frank Capra, Desert Victory relies heavily on captured German newsreel footage. Many of the most famous sequences in the film have been excerpted and appear with frequency in History Channel and A&E productions. The film won a special Oscar in 1943 and the 1951 film The Desert Fox: The Story of Rommel took sections of the film for its battle footage.

An early screening in the U.S., at New York's Museum of Modern Art, was for its "The Documentary Film" series, lasting from January through May 1946. This film was shown on April 1-2-3-4, and the Museum offered high praise:

"Before the American documentary had quite learned how to adapt itself to wartime uses, this fine record of the triumphant 1300 mile chase of Rommel's Afrika Korps from El Alamein to Tripoli, by the British 8th Army, came along to celebrate a victory, mark a turning point of the war, and spur on our own official film-makers to report back from the many fronts the thrilling facts of Allied combat. Exceptionally lucid as to the terrain and the action involved, the film also brought home with a shock to the average civilian the reality, the human element, of battle. It was, perhaps, the best and earliest vindication of the documentary film as the powerfully educational and inspiring force it can be."

== Reception ==
Critic James Agee writing in The Nation in 1943 lauded the film: "Desert Victory is the first completely admirable combat film ... It is so good, and so simply good, that it is hard to do more than urge that you see it. In the camera work, the cutting, the music and sound, the commentary, it is a clean, simple demonstration that creative imagination is the only possible substitute for the plainest sort of good sense—and is, after all, merely an intensification of good sense to the point of incandescence." Leslie Halliwell gave it four of four stars, stating simply, "Classic war documentary."

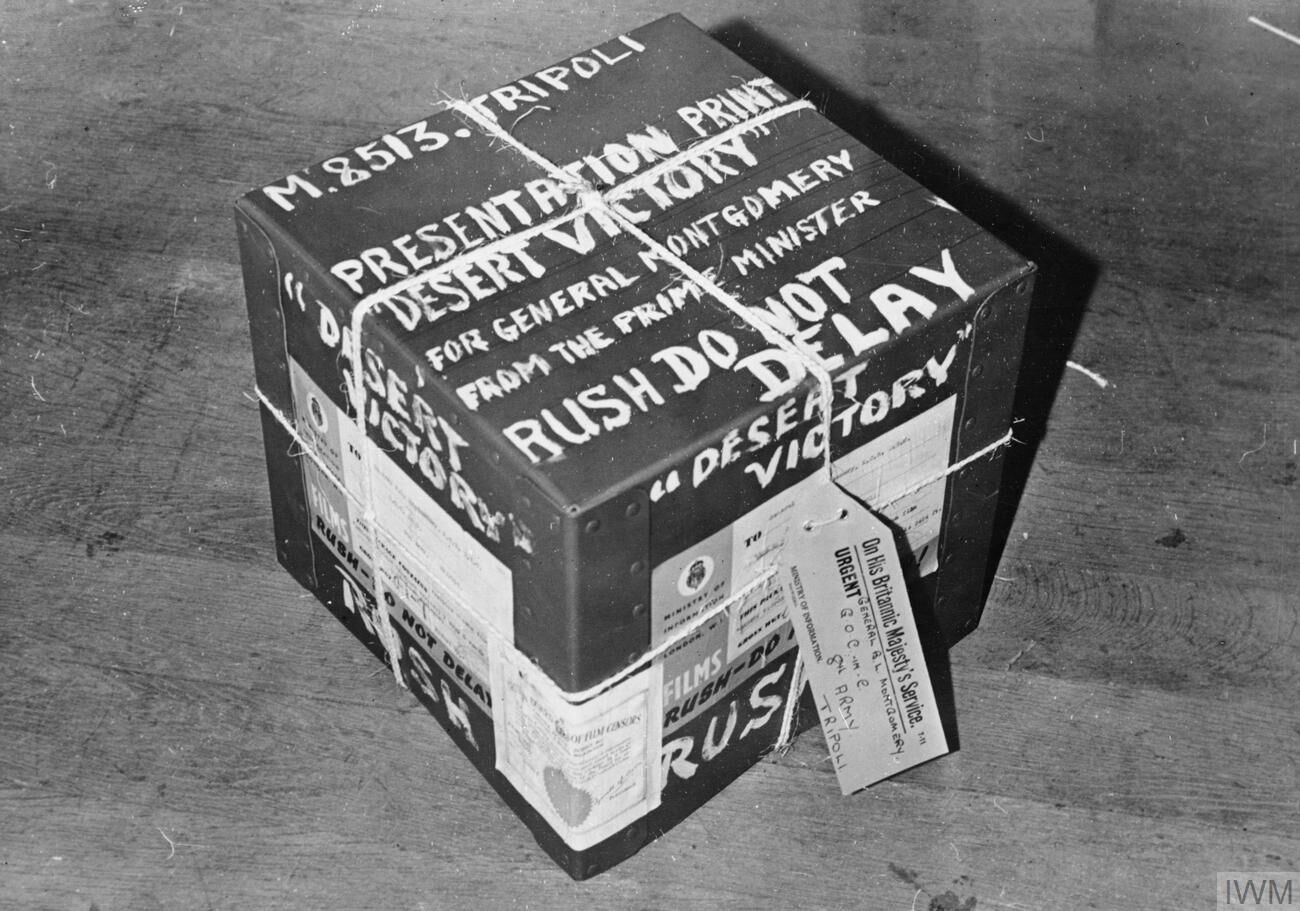
A photograph of a box containing the presentation print of the film Desert Victory, which was to be sent by the Prime Minister to General Montgomery in Tripoli. The box is covered in stickers marked 'urgent'.

== See also ==
- List of Allied Propaganda Films of World War 2
