= Saloon Bar (play) =

1939 British crime drama play

Saloon Bar is a 1939 British crime drama play written by Frank Harvey. It ran for a hundred and eighty performances at Wyndham's Theatre in London. The original cast included Gordon Harker, Mervyn Johns and Anna Konstam. It marked Margaret Johnston's West End debut. The regulars at a London pub attempt to prove that a man is about to be wrongly hanged for murder.

Harvey's Father adapted the play for Australian radio in 1941.

== Film adaptation ==
The following year the play was adapted into a film Saloon Bar directed by Walter Forde with Harker and several of the other stage performers reprising their roles.

== Bibliography ==
- Wearing, J.P. The London Stage 1930-1939: A Calendar of Productions, Performers, and Personnel. Rowman & Littlefield, 2014.
