= Mervyn Johns =

Welsh actor (1899–1992)

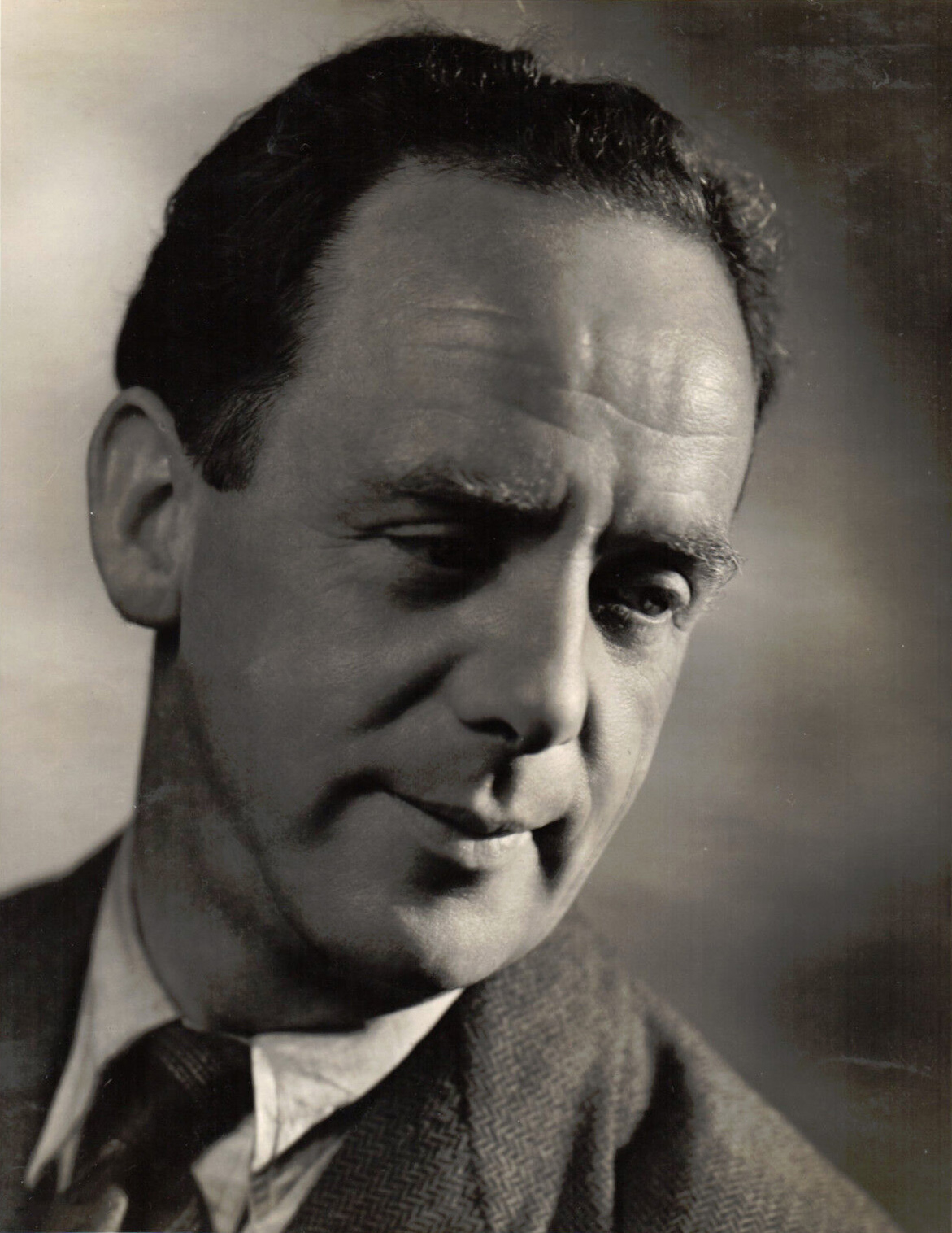
- Johns in The Halfway House (1944)
- Born: David Mervyn Johns; 18 February 1899; Pembroke, Pembrokeshire, Wales
- Died: 6 September 1992 (aged 93); Northwood, London, England
- Education: Royal Academy of Dramatic Art (Dip)
- Occupation: Actor
- Years active: 1923–1979
- Works: Full list
- Spouses: Alyce Steele-Wareham (m. 1922; died 1970) Diana Churchill (m. 1976)
- Children: Glynis Johns
- Relatives: John Geoffrey Jones (nephew); Gareth Forwood (grandson)

David Mervyn Johns (18 February 1899 – 6 September 1992) was a Welsh stage, film and television actor who became a fixture of British films during the Second World War. Johns appeared extensively on screen and stage with over 100 credits between 1923 and 1979.

He made his theatrical debut while on tour of the British dominions in 1923. After graduating from the Royal Academy of Dramatic Art with honours in 1924, he appeared in a succession of diverse roles in the West End and Bristol. He made his screen debut with Lady in Danger in 1934 and appeared in several supporting roles in the 1930s before becoming a leading man in the 1940s and 50s. In his most critically acclaimed period, he became an indelible part of British wartime cinema with starring roles in Saloon Bar (1940), The Next of Kin (1942), Went the Day Well? (1942), The Halfway House (1944), Twilight Hour (1945), and Dead of Night (1945).

In the postwar era, Johns worked regularly as a character actor at Ealing Studios with roles in They Knew Mr. Knight (1946), The Captive Heart (1946), Captain Boycott (1947), Easy Money (1948), and Scrooge (1951). He settled into supporting roles in later years with guest appearances on televised plays and anthology series. Johns also appeared in two films alongside his daughter Glynis Johns.

== Early life ==
Johns was born in Pembroke, Wales. He attended Llandovery College, an independent boarding school in South Wales, following the graduation of his brother who was later rector of Pusey and Weston-on-the-Green. From 1913, he played cricket and rugby for the school's national teams.

Upon leaving, he wanted to pursue a career in medicine and so attended Royal London Hospital, where he trained as a medical student. While there, he met concert pianist Alyce Steele-Wareham, who was studying at the Royal Academy of Music. She encouraged him to pursue a career in drama and so he enrolled at the Royal Academy of Dramatic Art. They married on 17 November 1922 in St Giles, London, and began touring with her family's theatre company. While the couple were touring South Africa on 23 October 1923, their only child, Glynis Johns, was born. They returned to England a few weeks later and Johns re-enrolled at the Royal Academy of Dramatic Art, where he graduated in 1924 with a gold medal.

Johns also served as a combat patrol pilot in the Royal Flying Corps and later in the Royal Air Force during the First World War. Of his time in the service, he declared "I don’t think there was a single moment when I was not scared to death".

== Career ==
=== Interwar ===
Johns made his stage debut while he and his first wife, Alyce Steele-Wareham, were touring the British dominions of South Africa, Australia and New Zealand in 1923. He had various roles in West End productions throughout the 1920s following his graduation from the Royal Academy of Dramatic Art in 1924 when he made his West End debut with London's Grand Guignol, a Comedy Theatre production directed by Lewis Casson. From 24 January 1926, he portrayed Mr Mingan in Allan Monkhouse's play Sons and Fathers with RADA. From 1931 to 1932, Johns starred in two productions at the Little Theatre in Bristol: When Knights Were Bold by Charles Marlowe and A Cup of Kindness by Ben Travers; at the same theatre from 16 to 21 October 1932, he played Mr Blanquet in John Drinkwater's comedy Bird In Hand. From 1932 to 1933, he starred in two more productions at Bristol's Little Theatre: The Rivals by Richard Brinsley Sheridan and Saint Joan by George Bernard Shaw. Following this, he played the Magistrate's Clerk in Walter Hackett's Hyde Park Corner from 5 October 1934 to 11 April 1935 at the Apollo Theatre in London, the same year as the eponymous film.

Johns made his screen debut in 1934 as the reporter in Ben Travers' comedy thriller Lady in Danger, going on to play Hemp in David MacDonald's 1937 crime film The Last Curtain, Sir Wilfred Lucas in the 1938 TV Movie adaptation of Jane Austen's Pride and Prejudice, and Percival Clicker in Oswald Mitchell's 1938 comedy film Almost a Gentleman.

In 1936, he starred as Sir John Brute alongside Kulia Crawley and Marda Vanne in an Embassy Theatre production of Sir John Vanbrugh's The Provoked Wife, prompting the renowned theatre critic and newspaper journalist James Agate (styled "the best judge of acting of the day") to remark that his acting was "blazingly good" and his role a "magnificent performance which would have warmed the heart's cockles of the old playgoers", saying that "in this actor's hands, Sir John is a brute indeed, not a pewling mooncalf, but a roaring bull. Mr Johns lets us see the pleasure he is taking in the fellow's brutish gusto. There are actors who could make the man as unbearable to an audience as he was to his own circle. Mr Johns, by lifting a corner of the brute's mind to show us his own, is right with Garrick."

Two years later, Johns was cast in Ivor Novello's play Comedienne (directed by Murray Macdonald), at the Aldwych Theatre in London. From 26 August 1937 to 12 March 1938, he played Ernest Beevers in J. P. Mitchelhill's adaptation of the J. B. Priestley time play Time and the Conways at the Duchess Theatre in London, and from 17 February to 17 June 1939, he played Sir Patrick Cullen in The Doctor’s Dilemma at the London Mask Theatre, Westminster Theatre and Whitehall Theatre. Of this role, Sieghard Erich Krueger writes that he "acheives [sic] a fine effect of crusted and downright integrity."

Johns' final film role of the interwar era was as Thomas in the 1939 British adventure thriller film Jamaica Inn, directed by Alfred Hitchcock.

=== Second World War ===
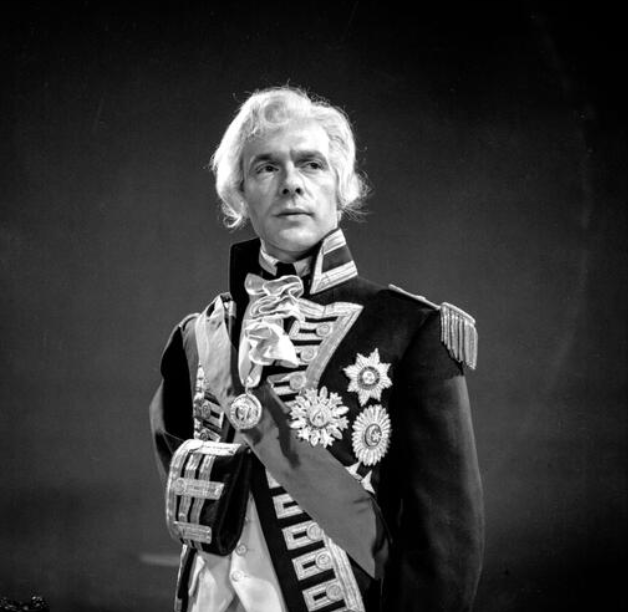
Johns at the Bristol Hippodrome in The Duke in Darkness (1943)

The Second World War ushered in a new era for British theatre and cinema. Johns avoided conscription due to his age, and thus began his career in various roles, though most often as the quirky yet dignified "frightened men" described by Adam Benedick. Among his dozens of film roles were the ultracrepidarian Charlie Wickers in the thriller film Saloon Bar (1940) and the church warden Charlie Sims in the war film Went the Day Well? (1942). In the Second World War propaganda film The Next of Kin (1942), Johns starred as the determined Agent 23 (Mr Arthur Davis), described by Robert Murphy as "the most cautious and effective agent – all the more sinister for being played by the kindly Welshman of so many other films of the period, Mervyn Johns." Following this, Johns played the homicidal maniac Arthur Grimshaw in the black-and-white comedy farce My Learned Friend (1943), the proprietor Rhys in the drama film The Halfway House (1944), and Major John Roberts in the drama film Twilight Hour (1945). Commenting on his role as the fearful architect Walter Craig in the 1945 mystery film Dead of Night, The Independent's Adam Benedick describes his approach as having a "masterly touch".

Of Johns' stage work, Benedick writes that he "showed a relish for Restoration comedy, but was also rated a ‘quintessential’ Priestley and Shavian actor in such shows as... Heartbreak House (1943), in which he replaced Robert Donat as Captain Shotover, and as Dolittle in Pygmalion (1947)"; his work of the prewar era was just the same. Less well-known are his roles in Frank Harvey's play Saloon Bar from 15 November 1939 to 30 March 1940 at Wyndham’s Theatre in London, Ken Attiwill and Evadne Price's play Once a Crook as Hallelujah Harry from 3 June 1940 to 12 July 1941, and Patrick Hamilton's play The Duke in Darkness from 1942 to 1943 at the Bristol Hippodrome.

=== Postwar ===
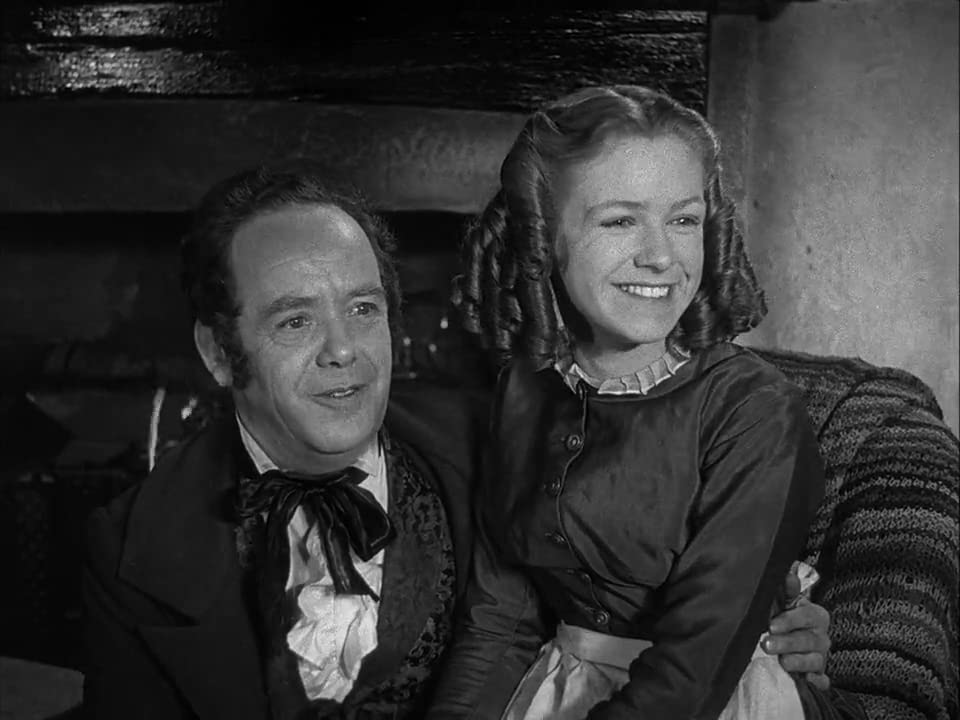
Johns and Moiya Kelly in Scrooge (1951)

Following the end of the Second World War on 4 September 1945, Johns continued to be cast in leading roles. In Robert Hamer's 1945 crime drama film Pink String and Sealing Wax, he played the "unexpectedly severe" Mr. Edward Sutton, a middle-class Victorian and newly appointed court analyst; in Norman Walker's 1946 drama film They Knew Mr. Knight, he played the main protagonist Tom Blake, playing to his "fretful features"; in Paul L. Stein's 1948 thriller film Counterblast, he played Doctor Bruckner the Beast of Ravensbruck, an escaped Nazi who murders a visiting scientist from Australia and assumes his identity, "in splendid villainous mode". His supporting roles in this era included playing Ernest Bennett in Ralph Thomas' romantic comedy film Helter Skelter, and Bob Cratchit in Brian Desmond Hurst's 1951 Christmas fantasy drama film adaptation of Charles Dickens's A Christmas Carol, with Alastair Sim as the cantankerous title character and miser.

On stage, he appeared in Erskine Caldwell and Jack Kirkland's production of Tobacco Road at the West End in 1949, Michael Norbury's play Love’s a Funny Thing from 10 to 12 March 1949 at The Ambassadors Theatre in London, Harold Martin's play The Martins’ Nest from 12 April to 12 May 1951 at the Westminster Theatre in London, James Forsyth's play Fulbert as the uncle and guardian of Heloise beginning on 14 November 1951 at the Duke of York's Theatre in London, and Eric Linklater's play The Mortimer Touch as Shurie from 30 April to 7 June 1952 at the same theatre.

Though he had appeared in one television film (a made-for-television production of Pride and Prejudice in 1938), Johns made his television series debut relatively late when he was cast as Harold Simpson in the episode The Happy Sunday Afternoon of BBC Sunday Night Theatre in 1950. On the same show, he was given the role of Albert Eccles in the 1954 episode Caste, Samuel Pepys in the 1954 episode Ninety Sail, Rough in the 1957 episode Gaslight, and His Excellency the Governor in the 1957 episode His Excellency. In 1956, Johns was given the lead role of J. Philimore Sparkes in six episodes of the television series New Ramps For Old, in which he was cast alongside Harry H. Corbett and Colin Tapley, who played Kegworthy and Detective Inspector Welsh respectively. Following this, he was given the lead role of Lawrence Todhunter in six episodes of the television series Leave It to Todhunter in 1958. He is remembered for standout roles as Arthur Charles Parfitt and Edward Lumsden in five episodes of the courtroom drama television series Crown Court alongside his grandson, actor Gareth Forwood, from 1973 to 1975. In 1987, Johns appeared as a contributor in the documentary The Cavalry of the Clouds, produced by British regional commercial television station HTV West.

== Public image ==
Johns was known for his "mostly mild-mannered, lugubrious, amusing, sometimes moving 'little men'" in over 100 films and television series. He is recurrently hailed as one of Ealing Studios' most prolific actors. In his book Realism and Tinsel: Cinema and Society in Britain 1939-48, Robert Murphy describes Johns as a "mainstay of so many Ealing films". In September 2022, he was named the 40th most popular Welsh actor of all time, after being absent from public attention for almost fifty years and dead for thirty.

== Personal life ==
Johns married twice. His first wife was concert pianist Alyce Maude Steele-Wareham, whom he married on 17 November 1922 in Saint Giles, London, and with whom he had his only child, the actress Glynis Johns, while on tour in Pretoria, South Africa. He and Glynis appeared together in two drama films: The Halfway House in 1944 and The Sundowners in 1960. After Alyce's death on 1 September 1971, he married actress Diana Churchill on 4 December 1976 in Hillingdon, London.

Johns died on 6 September 1992 in Northwood, London at the age of 93. His funeral was held privately.
