= Seagulls Over Sorrento =

1954 film

- UK quad poster
- Directed by: John Boulting; Roy Boulting
- Screenplay by: Frank Harvey; Roy Boulting
- Based on: Seagulls Over Sorrento by Hugh Hastings
- Produced by: John Boulting; Roy Boulting
- Starring: Gene Kelly; John Justin; Bernard Lee
- Cinematography: Gilbert Taylor
- Edited by: Max Benedict
- Music by: Miklós Rózsa; Ernesto de Curtis
- Production company: Metro-Goldwyn-Mayer
- Distributed by: Loew's, Inc.
- Release date: 13 July 1954 (London)
- Running time: 92 minutes
- Country: United Kingdom
- Language: English
- Budget: $675,000
- Box office: $939,000

Seagulls Over Sorrento (U.S. title: Crest of the Wave) is a 1954 British war drama film directed by the Boulting brothers and starring Gene Kelly, John Justin and Bernard Lee. It was written by Frank Harvey and Roy Boulting based on the 1949 play of the same name by Hugh Hastings.

== Plot ==
A small group of British sailors stationed on a Scottish island engaged in top-secret research on a new and dangerous torpedo are joined by a US Navy scientist, Lt. Brad Bradville, and his assistants. When several tests of the weapon fail, and men are killed, tensions within the group mount. Bradville must prove that the torpedo can work and win over the British, especially Lt. Rogert Wharton, before the Admiralty pulls the plug on the project.

== Cast ==
- Gene Kelly as Lt. "Brad" Bradville (USN)
- John Justin as Lt. Roger Wharton
- Bernard Lee as Able Seaman "Lofty" Turner
- Jeff Richards as Torpedoman 2d Class "Butch" Clelland (USN)
- Sid James as Able Seaman Charlie "Badge" Badger
- Patric Doonan as Petty Officer Herbert
- Ray Jackson as Able Seaman "Sprog" Sims
- Fredd Wayne as Torpedoman 2d Class "Shorty" Karminsky (USN)
- Patrick Barr as Cmdr. Sinclair
- David Orr as Able Seaman "Haggis" Mackintosh
- John Horsley as John Phillips, Medical Officer
- Lockwood West as Curly, Stores Petty Officer
- Harry Van Engel as Able Seaman Dawson
- John Fabian as Lieutenant Lane
- Peter Bathurst as Geoff
- Martin Boddey as member of Admiralty Board
- Ronald Adam as member of Admiralty Board
- John Rolfe as Wireless Operator

== Original play ==
The original stage play was written by Australian playwright Hugh Hastings and was based on his experiences in World War II. It opened in London's West End on 14 June 1950, and was a hit there, but played for only two weeks on Broadway in New York City. Bernard Lee played the same role in the London stage production.

The play ran for over 1,600 performances in London. Film rights were sold to the Boulting Brothers for £10,000.

== Production ==
Because the play – in which all the characters were British, and the emphasis was more on the enlisted men than in the film – was a hit, MGM retained the title for the film everywhere except in the US and Canada, where the title Crest of the Wave was used.

Although set on a Scottish island, the movie was filmed in Jersey and at Fort Clonque on Alderney in the Channel Islands, with interiors filmed at MGM's British studios at Borehamwood, Elstree. Production took place between 4 May and late July 1953. The corvette monitoring the tests was HMS Hedingham Castle (pennant F386).

Ernesto de Curtis's song "Torna a Sorrento" ("Come Back to Sorrento"), is performed on the concertina by David Orr, and was also used as background music throughout the film.

The film was one of three made by Kelly in Europe over an 18-month period to make use of frozen MGM funds.

It was shot at MGM's Elstree Studios with sets designed by the art director Alfred Junge with location shooting taking place in the Channel Islands.

== Release ==
Although the film finished shooting in July 1953, MGM was contractually obligated not to release the film until the play Seagulls Over Sorrento finished its West End run, which delayed the film's release until 13 July 1954, almost a year after filming had completed. The film then premiered in New York City on 10 November of that year, and went into general American release on 6 December.

== Reception ==
=== Box office ===
According to MGM records the film earned $349,000 in the US and Canada and $59,000 elsewhere, resulting in a loss of $58,000.

=== Critical ===
The Monthly Film Bulletin wrote: "The long-running stage success by Hugh Hastings has undergone something of a transformation in this M.G.M. version by the Boulting Brothers. It no longer looks like a stage play (the action includes a good deal of exterior shooting), and the theme of Anglo-American co-operation is now the story's main issue. Secret weapons are familiar enough in films of service life, but it is something of a surprise to find Gene Kelly as an American naval back-room scientist working on one of them. His performance is, nevertheless, quietly effective and convincing. The ' lower-deck' scenes between the British and American sailors include a good deal of conventional humour, although the service atmosphere here strikes a more authentic note than usual."

Variety wrote: "With Gene Kelly in the lead, this British production has potent marquee values in the U. S. although an overplus of cockney dialog may prove a deterrent in some situations. This is particularly a failing of the opening sequences, but once the plot gets under way there is sufficient dramatic content to override it. In its transference from stage to screen the canvas has been broad-ned and the plot adjusted to give it a more acceptable Anglo-U.S. flavor. ... Under the studied direction of Roy Boulting, the all-male cast contribute solid performances. Gene Kelly fills the role of the scientist with genuine conviction."

Filmink magazine wrote: "The guts of the play – the adventures of ordinary seamen – was still there, but was greatly truncated in order to make room for a whole new plot about the officers conducting the torpedo experiments... [and] a new subplot added about the clash between American and British methods... In hindsight, this was a bad decision. I don’t think there was anything wrong with adding action or even Americans... but taking the focus away from ordinary seamen and emphasising the officers was totally contrary to the DNA of Seagulls Over Sorrento... The Gene Kelly-MGM Seagulls of Sorrento was a hybrid, part-action film, part-abridged version of the play; audiences sensed it and stayed away. Still, it’s not a bad watch, with pleasing photography and location work, and superb performances from Sid James and Bernard Lee (Lofty)."

== 1960 Australian TV adaptation ==
The film was adapted for Australian television in 1960.

== Scapa ==
Hastings later did a musical version of his play called Scapa which debuted in London in 1962. It received terrible reviews.
