= The Last Curtain =

- Opening titles
- Directed by: David MacDonald
- Written by: Derek B. Mayne; A. R. Rawlinson
- Produced by: Anthony Havelock-Allan
- Starring: Campbell Gullan; Kenne Duncan; Greta Gynt
- Cinematography: Francis Carver
- Edited by: Lister Laurance
- Production company: British and Dominions
- Distributed by: Paramount British Pictures
- Release date: 23 July 1937
- Running time: 67 minutes
- Country: United Kingdom
- Language: English

The Last Curtain is a 1937 British comedy crime film directed by David MacDonald and starring Campbell Gullan, Kenne Duncan and Greta Gynt. It was written by Derek B. Mayne and A. R. Rawlinson, and made at Pinewood Studios as a quota quickie. The film's sets were designed by John Bryan. It was the first film for comedy actor Joss Ambler who went on to star with such comedy stalwarts as George Formby and Will Hay.

== Plot ==
Insurance assessor Bob Fenton is investigating a series of robberies. He uncovers the burglars living in a bakery, where the jewels are hidden in doughnuts. Pretending to be a villain, Fenton is hired by the gang's boss, Joe Garsatti, to surveil the actor Sir Alan Masterville, who fences the jewels. Garsatti is suspicious of Fenton and, dressed as him, shoots Masterville, who, before he dies, is able to identify Garsatti as his murderer.

== Cast ==
- Campbell Gullan as Sir Alan Masterville
- Kenne Duncan as Joe Garsatti
- Greta Gynt as Julie Rendle
- John Wickham as Bob Fenton
- Sara Seegar as Molly
- Joss Ambler as Ellis
- W.G. Fay as Milligam
- Eric Hales as Barrington
- Mervyn Johns as Hemp

== Reception ==
The Monthly Film Bulletin wrote: "The plot is neat and well handled and gives ample scope to Campbell Gullan as Sir Alan; his satire of a temperamental actor is excellent. John Wickham provides good looks and plenty of dash as the hero. The technical qualities are first-class."

The Daily Film Renter wrote: "Crook melodrama in West End theatre setting, told with equal emphasis on both comedy and dramatic angles. New treatment of familiar situations, allied with smooth and imaginative direction which brings out subtleties of humorous angle of hammy actor-manager and conceits of stage-land, makes picture a usable supporting feature."

Picture Show wrote: "Here is a very exciting and ingenious crook drama which is relieved by some very smart comedy."
