= Easy Money (1948 film) =

British film by Bernard Knowles

- Original poster
- Directed by: Bernard Knowles
- Written by: Arnold Ridley (play); Muriel Box; Sydney Box
- Produced by: A. Frank Bundy
- Starring: Greta Gynt; Dennis Price; Jack Warner; Petula Clark; Mervyn Johns
- Distributed by: Gainsborough Pictures
- Release date: 20 January 1948
- Country: United Kingdom
- Language: English
- Budget: £116,821
- Box office: £125,300 (by Dec 1949) or £119,000

Easy Money is a 1948 British satirical film directed by Bernard Knowles and starring Greta Gynt, Dennis Price and Jack Warner. It was written by Muriel and Sydney Box, based on the 1948 play of the same title by Arnold Ridley. It was released by Gainsborough Pictures.

The film comprises four tales about the effect a major football pools win has in four different situations in the post-war period.

== Plot ==
In the first story, a comedy, a content suburban family is turned into an unhappy lot by their various reactions to a win on the football pools. When matters reach a point where they begin wishing that they had never won the money, the youngest daughter announces that in fact she forgot to post their entry, and they all regain their previously happy lives. But then it is discovered that it was a previous entry she had forgotten to post and the winning coupon was mailed, and they decide that they have learned a lesson and resolve not to let the money ruin their happiness.

In the second, a mild-mannered clerk with a domineering wife wins a large amount but becomes concerned when his wife insists he quit his mundane job. He finds the prospect of having to tell his employer that he is resigning too daunting, so he plots with a friend that he will fake illness as a way of leaving, but the deceit proves so taxing that he suffers a heart attack.

The third is a crime caper involving a part-time coupon checker and his nightclub singer girlfriend who devise a scheme to embezzle the winning pot.

The final episode, another comedy, concerns a disillusioned double-bass player who after a large win on the pools discovers he misses his friends in the orchestra he left, so he becomes its benefactor, subject to the condition that the double-bass section is given unusual prominence in the orchestral lineup.

== Cast ==
- E.V.H. Emmett as narrator
- Greta Gynt as Pat Parsons
- Dennis Price as Joe Henty
- Jack Warner as Philip Stafford
- Mervyn Johns as Herbert Atkins
- Marjorie Fielding as Ruth Stafford
- Yvonne Owen as Carol Stafford
- Jack Watling as Dennis Stafford
- Petula Clark as Jackie Stafford
- Mabel Constanduros as Grandma Stafford
- David Tomlinson as Martin Latham
- Maurice Denham as Detective-Inspector Kirby
- Joan Young as Agnes Watkins
- Gordon McLeod as Cameron
- Grey Blake as Wilson
- Ernest Butcher as clerk
- Bill Owen as Mr. Lee
- Hugh Pryse as Martin
- Jack Raine as managing director
- Richard Molinas as Johnny
- Edward Rigby as Edward "Teddy" Ball
- Guy Rolfe as Archie
- Raymond Lovell as Mr. Cyprus
- Frank Cellier as director of orchestra
- John Blythe as waiter

== Reception ==
=== Critical ===
The Monthly Film Bulletin wrote: "On the whole, the film is quite good propaganda for football pools, but it is only very moderate entertainment. For the first two stories, there is music around the Episodes (i.e. accompanying the commentary), not in them. In Episodes 3 and 4, however, there is background music in addition to the necessary featured music – a bad plan, perhaps, but well carried out."

The Daily Film Renter wrote: "Simple human interest stuff, with a strong slant on natural comedy, brief documentary excerpts showing how the pools are run, an amusing commentary, and a popular topic that will appeal to the million, this film is a real windfall for the exhibitor."

Kine Weekly wrote: "Its competently presented, if a trifle exaggerated, cameos are complete in themselves and cover a wide range of human conduct and emotions, but appropriate commentary, smoothly delivered by E. H. V. Emmett, gives them some semblance of continuity and, at the same time, enables them to be encased in the same 'boards.' Topical, cunningly varied popular entertainment, it's the answer to the shrewd exploiteer's dream. Very good novelty booking."

Picturegoer wrote: "Pleasant entertainment, but too disjointed."

Picture Show wrote: "It is bright and British."

=== Box office ===
The film earned producer's receipts of £98,600 in the UK and £20,400 overseas. According to Rank's records the film had made a profit of £2,200 for the company by December 1949.
