= The Halfway House =

1944 film by Basil Dearden

- British quad poster
- Directed by: Basil Dearden
- Written by: Angus MacPhail; Diana Morgan; Roland Pertwee (script contributor); T.E.B. Clarke (script contributor)
- Based on: play The Peaceful Inn by Dennis Ogden
- Produced by: Michael Balcon
- Starring: Mervyn Johns; Glynis Johns; Tom Walls; Françoise Rosay
- Cinematography: Wilkie Cooper
- Edited by: Charles Hasse
- Music by: Lord Berners
- Color process: Black and white
- Production company: Ealing Studios
- Distributed by: ABPC (UK)
- Release dates: 14 April 1944 (London); 5 June 1944 (UK film date); 12 August 1945 (New York City)
- Running time: 95 minutes
- Country: United Kingdom
- Language: English

The Halfway House is a 1944 British drama fantasy horror film directed by Basil Dearden and starring Mervyn Johns, his daughter Glynis Johns, Tom Walls and Françoise Rosay. The film tells the story of ten people who are drawn to stay in an old Welsh countryside inn. Location scenes were shot at Barlynch Priory on the Devon/Somerset border.

The film was "suggested by" the 1940 three act play The Peaceful Inn by Denis Ogden set in Dartmoor that made no mention of the war. A November 1957 BBC television film was made of The Peaceful Inn.

BFI Screenonline writes, "The high-quality personnel involved and the tight, professional scripting mark the film out as one of the earliest templates of what would become the traditional Ealing style."

== Plot ==
During World War II, various people converge on the Halfway House, an inn in the Welsh countryside. In the previous scenes, we see the events that led them there. In Cardiff, David Davies, a famous orchestral conductor, is advised by his doctor to cancel a tour and rest. In London, Richard French and his wife Jill argue over their young daughter Joanna, who overhears them from outside discussing divorce. At Parkmoor Prison, Captain Fortescue, a thief expelled from the service, is released. In a Welsh port, merchant captain Harry Meadows and his wife Alice quarrel about their deceased son, a victim of a U-boat attack. Black marketeer Oakley departs from London for some fishing, while Margaret and her Irish fiancé Terence take a train from Bristol. Margaret and Terence face the end of their relationship when Terence accepts a diplomatic post in Berlin and doesn't seem to understand why she, a British woman, doesn't want to live in a country her own country is at war with.

At the inn, the proprietor Rhys seems to materialise out of thin air. He tells a puzzled Fortescue that he was expected. When Oakley signs the register, he notices a long gap after the last signature, dated a year earlier. In the course of the day, the other guests arrive and register. A series of odd occurrences unfolds. For example, on being served tea, Alice Meadows is shocked to see no reflection of Rhys in a mirror. Outside the inn, Fortescue and Oakley notice that Gwyneth, Rhys's daughter, casts no shadow, though Joanna, standing nearby, does. Meanwhile, in an effort to reunite her parents, Joanna arranges a fake near-drowning, with the help of Captain Meadows. It nearly goes awry.

At dinner, Rhys relates how the inn was bombed and destroyed by German aeroplanes exactly a year previously. Afterwards, while Davies is helping Gwyneth wash the dishes, she tells him "you're coming our way". He understands. Alice arranges a seance, much to her husband's disapproval. During it, he deliberately turns on the radio, to a programme where serving members of the armed forces send vocal messages to family back home, and for a few seconds Alice thinks it's her son. When they realise the truth, a devastated Alice storms out. When the others berate the captain for his horrible trick, he tells them that he just wants his son to rest in peace. Rhys suggests he tell his wife this; he does and the couple are reconciled.

Then, radio broadcasts from 1942 convince everyone they have travelled a year back in time. Rhys explains they are all there because they need a pause to consider their lives. The air raid proceeds as Rhys described. Richard French's paramount concern for his wife and Joanna's safety reunites them, while both Fortescue and Oakley repent their criminal ways. Terence decides to join the British forces to fight Germany. The guests leave behind a demolished inn.

== Cast ==
- Mervyn Johns as Rhys
- Glynis Johns as Gwyneth, his daughter
- Tom Walls as Capt. Meadows
- Françoise Rosay as Alice Meadows (as Francoise Rosay)
- Esmond Knight as David Davies
- Guy Middleton as Fortescue
- Alfred Drayton as Oakley
- Valerie White as Jill French
- Richard Bird as Sqn. Ldr. French
- Sally Ann Howes as Joanna French, their daughter
- Philippa Hiatt as Margaret
- Pat McGrath as Terence
- C. V. France as The Solicitor
- Roland Pertwee as Prison Governor
- Eliot Makeham as The Dresser
- John Boxer as The Doctor
- Rachel Thomas as The Landlady
- Joss Ambler as Pinsent
- Jack Jones as Welsh Porter
- Moses Jones as Welsh Porter

== Reception ==
The film premiered in London at the Regal, Marble Arch on 14 April 1944, and The Times reviewer wrote: "The film elusively obtains its effects when it appears to be least striving after them, and an occasional frisson is achieved by acute touches of direction which light up not only depths of human tension and unhappiness, but also unobtrusively reckon with their cause—the war."

George Perry wrote in Forever Ealing (1981), "No matter how well-acted, the fantasy is hard to sustain and never develops beyond a theatrical morality tale." The Huffington Post reviewer disagreed, writing "I really can't recommend The Halfway House enough: unlike the more overt Ealing war films (which this resembles in many ways, not least the disparate group coming together and working together), this is subtler propaganda, and its overarching supernatural atmosphere is well done. Apart from that, however, it offers strong character portraits, great visual flourishes, and another solid turn from [Mervyn] Johns." Flickering Myth called it "an unseen and unappreciated classic of British cinema".
