= Lady in Danger (film) =

1934 film by Tom Walls

- Original Trade Ad Poster
- Directed by: Tom Walls
- Written by: Marjorie Gaffney; Ben Travers
- Produced by: Michael Balcon
- Starring: Tom Walls; Yvonne Arnaud
- Cinematography: Philip Tannura
- Edited by: Helen Lewis
- Music by: Jack Beaver
- Production company: Gaumont British
- Distributed by: Gaumont British Distributors (UK)
- Release date: 27 November 1934 (London)
- Running time: 68 minutes
- Country: United Kingdom
- Language: English

Lady in Danger is a 1934 British comedy thriller film directed by Tom Walls and starring Walls, Yvonne Arnaud and Anne Grey. The screenplay was by Ben Travers and Marjorie Gaffney.

== Plot ==
In the mythical European country of Ardenberg, General Dittling (Leon M. Lion) stages a military coup. His supporters believe that he will set up a republic but it is actually his desire to restore the monarchy. Therefore, he persuades British businessman Richard Dexter (Tom Walls) to escort the Queen (Yvonne Arnaud) to the safety of England. Once there his relations with the Queen are farcically misconstrued, when his fiancée Lydia (Anne Gray) arrives unannounced. After many adventures, the King (Hugh Wakefield), who has fled to Paris, is reunited with his wife.

== Cast ==
- Tom Walls as Richard Dexter
- Yvonne Arnaud as Queen of Ardenberg
- Anne Grey as Lydia
- Leon M. Lion as Dittling
- Hugh Wakefield as King
- Marie Lohr as Lady Brockley
- Alfred Drayton as Quill
- Leonora Corbett as Marcelle
- O. B. Clarence as Nelson
- Cecil Parker as Piker
- Harold Warrender as Clive
- Hubert Harben as Matterby
- Charles Lefeaux as Hotel Manager
- Dorothy Galbraith as Mrs. Quill
- Jane Cornell as Shop Assistant
- Mervyn Johns as Reporter

== Critical reception ==
TV Guide described the film as "a vague comedy that refuses to commit itself to a romance between the leads" ; while Allmovie called it an "airy comedy-melodrama...the farcical possibilities of Lady in Danger are played to the hilt, and the rest is good semi-clean fun."

== Life imitates art ==
Lady in Danger was released in 1934, two years before the beginning of the Spanish Civil War. However, there are some intriguing parallels between the movie and the later civil war, particularly the similarities between the fictional General Dittling and the real-life Generalissimo Francisco Franco. During the war, Franco was part of the Spanish Confederation of Autonomous Right-wing Groups. He later became the dictatorial ruler of Spain. In 1969, in a surprise move, the monarchist-leaning Franco designated Prince Juan Carlos de Borbón as his successor. When Franco died in 1975, he was indeed succeeded by the prince as King Juan Carlos I.

== Bibliography ==
- Sutton, David R. A chorus of raspberries: British film comedy 1929-1939. University of Exeter Press, 2000.
