= David MacDonald (director) =

Scottish film director, writer and producer (1904–1983)

- Born: May 9, 1904; Helensburgh
- Died: June 22, 1983 (aged 79); London
- Occupations: Film director, writer and producer

David MacDonald (9 May 1904 in Helensburgh, Dunbartonshire – 22 June 1983 in London) was a Scottish film director, writer and producer.

== Career ==
MacDonald was the son of a wealthy landowner. His intention was to become a doctor but changed his mind and aged 17 went to Malaya to work on a rubber plantation for seven and a half years. When he had leave to return to Scotland, he travelled via Hollywood and became interested in filmmaking. He returned to Malaya and worked at a plantation in Kedah. According to one story, while in Malaya he met Douglas Fairbanks who encouraged MacDonald to try his luck in Hollywood.

=== Hollywood ===
MacDonald broke into Hollywood by getting a job as technical adviser on a film Prestige. After that he was out of work for nine months.

He eventually gained a job working for Cecil B. DeMille. MacDonald worked as DeMille's assistant on The Sign of the Cross (1932), Four Frightened People (1934), Cleopatra (also 1934) and The Crusades (1935). He worked on Lives of a Bengal Lancer (also 1935) with Henry Hathaway. He also worked for King Vidor and Raoul Walsh. He returned to England with Walsh when the latter came to direct O.H.M.S. (1937) and elected to stay.

=== Quota quickies ===
OHMS was made for Michael Balcon at Shepherd's Bush studio in London. Balcon recommended MacDonald to make his directorial debut with a "B" quota quickies: Double Alibi (1937).

MacDonald followed it with other quota quickies: an adaptation of It's Never Too Late to Mend (1937) with Tod Slaughter; The Last Curtain (1937); Death Croons the Blues (1937); Riding High (1937); Make It Three (1938); A Spot of Bother (1938); and Meet Mr. Penny (1938).

Some of these were produced by Anthony Havelock-Allan who also produced MacDonald's This Man Is News (1938), which became a surprise hit. It starred Barry K. Barnes. He was sought by producers Erich Pommer and Charles Laughton to direct The Admirable Crichton for their independent film production company, Mayflower Pictures, which had secured a distribution deal through Paramount Pictures, but the outbreak of World War II cancelled the project.

MacDonald went on to make Dead Men Tell No Tales (1938); This Man in Paris (1939), a sequel to This Man Is News, with Barnes; Spies of the Air (1939); The Midas Touch (1940); Law and Disorder (1940); and This England (1940).

=== World War Two ===
MacDonald tried to enlist but was told he was too old. He was however sent to France to do some filming for Military Intelligence. Returning home he made Men of the Lightship (1940). The War Office then called him and asked him to form the Army Film Unit, where he rose to the rank of major. MacDonald was transferred to the Middle East, where he helped make the documentary Desert Victory (1943). Several people who worked on the film for MacDonald were killed in action. In 1943, he accompanied the film on a ten-week tour of the US and it was announced MacDonald would make films for Alexander Korda. However, MacDonald stayed in the army.

He served with the Army Film Unit during the invasions of Sicily and Italy, and fell ill with malaria. This meant he was unable to take part in the invasion of France. He worked at Pinewood Studios for six-months with the Army Film Unit, then was transferred to the Far East where he made Burma Victory (1946). He also took this film on a lecture tour through the USA.

=== Sydney Box ===
When MacDonald left the army, he began to work for producer Sydney Box. He made the Scottish melodrama The Brothers (1947) with Patricia Roc, partly shot on location on the Isle of Skye. MacDonald then made Snowbound (1948), an Alpine-set thriller based on a novel by Hammond Innes; and Good-Time Girl (1948) with Jean Kent.

MacDonald directed two flops for Box, both biopics: The Bad Lord Byron (1949) with Dennis Price, and Christopher Columbus (1949), with Fredric March. Also unsuccessful at the box office was Diamond City (1949), an attempt to make a British western in South Africa.

=== Later career ===
MacDonald made two films for Audrey Baring. He had a hit with Cairo Road (1950) with Eric Portman and Laurence Harvey, partly shot in Egypt. The Adventurers (1951), also shot in Africa and featuring Jack Hawkins, was less successful.

For Tempean Films, MacDonald made The Lost Hours (1952) with Jean Kent and Mark Stevens. He followed it with Tread Softly (1952).

MacDonald returned to documentaries with Operation Malaya (1953), about the Malayan Emergency. He was the director of the science fiction film Devil Girl from Mars (1954) for the Danziger Brothers. MacDonald directed episodes of Saber of London and worked on many other TV shows. He did the thriller Alias John Preston (1955). He made a comedy Small Hotel (1957) then did a swashbuckler set during the English civil war, The Moonraker (1958). He followed it with comedies: A Lady Mislaid (1958), Petticoat Pirates (1961), and The Golden Rabbit (1962).

== Select filmography ==
- The Last Curtain (1937)
- When the Poppies Bloom Again (short, 1937)
- Double Alibi (short, 1937)
- It's Never Too Late to Mend (1937)
- Death Croons the Blues (1937)
- Riding High (1937)
- Make It Three (1938)
- A Spot of Bother (1938)
- Meet Mr. Penny (1938)
- This Man Is News (1938)
- Dead Men Tell No Tales (1938)
- This Man in Paris (1939)
- Law and Disorder (1940)
- The Midas Touch (1940)
- Men of the Lightship (propaganda film, 1940)
- Desert Victory (propaganda film, 1943)
- The Brothers (1947)
- Good-Time Girl (1948)
- Christopher Columbus (1949)
- Diamond City (1949)
- The Bad Lord Byron (1949)
- Cairo Road (1950)
- The Adventurers (1951)
- Tread Softly (1952)
- The Lost Hours (1952)
- One Just Man [episode of 'The Vise'] (1954)
- The Yellow Robe (1954)
- Devil Girl from Mars (1954)
- Triple Blackmail (1955)
- Three Cornered Fate (1955)
- Operation Malaya (1955)
- Final Column (1955)
- Man in Demand (1955)
- Alias John Preston (1955)
- Small Hotel (1957)
- A Lady Mislaid (1958)
- The Moonraker (1958)
- Petticoat Pirates (1961)
- The Golden Rabbit (1962)
