= Army Film and Photographic Unit =

British Army media production branch in World War II

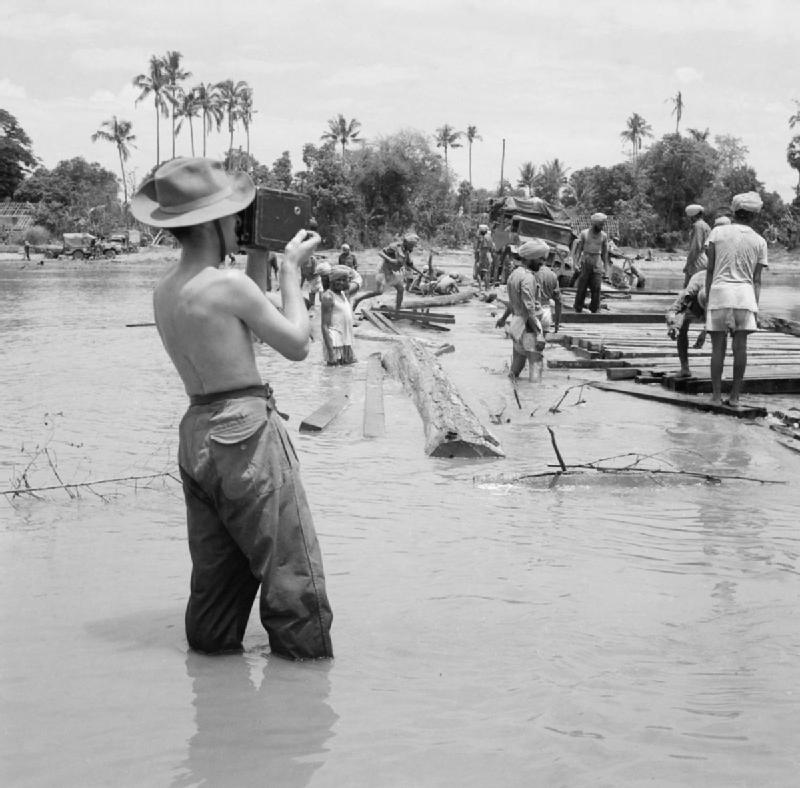
A member of Number 9 Unit films Indian troops crossing a river during the Burma Campaign 1944–45. Meiktila, Burma, 1945

The Army Film and Photographic Unit was a subdivision of the British armed forces set up on 24 October 1941, to record military events in which the British and Commonwealth armies were engaged. During the war, almost 23 percent of all AFPU soldiers were killed in action; the AFPU was disbanded in 1946.

== History ==
At the outbreak of the Second World War in 1939, the Ministry of Information controlled and censored publicity related to all military and civil actions. Separately, the Director of Public Relations, War Office dealt specifically with the affairs of the British army. It was quickly realised that the front line was no place for untrained photographers and cameramen and a call was made to recruit soldiers who had pre-war professional experience with cameras and cine film.

Under Lt. Col. Hugh St. Clair Stewart, Pinewood Studio was selected as the headquarters of the new unit called the Army Film and Photographic Unit (AFPU) as well as the RAF Film Unit and the Crown Film Unit, who produced propaganda films for the Ministry of Information. It was here that soldiers could be trained in recording events at the front. From this establishment, photographers and cameramen travelled with various regiments to record the British army in action.

== AFPU Number 1 Unit - North Africa ==
In early 1942, 30 cameramen were sent to Cairo, Egypt to form AFPU's Number 1 Unit. This group, led by Major David MacDonald (a former GPO Film Unit member) first recorded (using Canadian-made 35 mm DeVry cine cameras and 120 Super Ikonta stills cameras) the retreat forced by the German Afrikakorps under General Rommel and then the offensive following the First Battle of El Alamein. It was at the start of the Alamein offensive that Sergeant Billy Jordan MM, skilfully filmed the opening artillery barrage. Footage of the North African campaign was used in the making of Desert Victory which won a best war documentary Academy Award in 1943. During the North African Campaign, the AFPU Number 1 Unit of 32 men, suffered four killed, seven wounded and six captured.

== AFPU Number 2 Unit ==
Unit Number 2 covered the campaigns through Tunisia (from which the 1944 documentary Tunisian Victory was made) and then through the landings on Sicily and Italy.

== AFPU Number 5 Unit - Europe ==
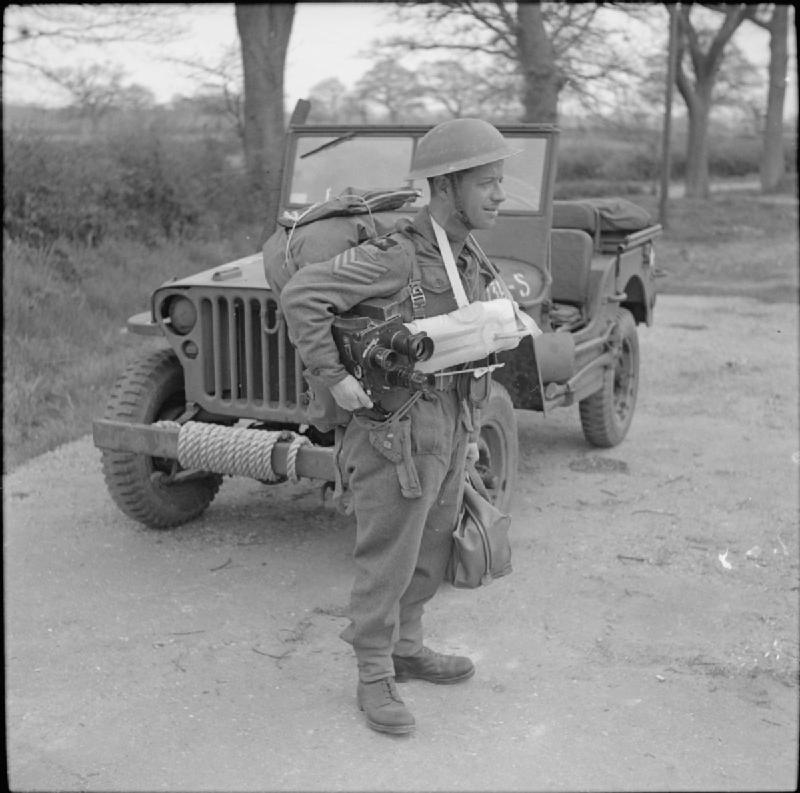
Sergeant W A Greenhalgh, Army Film and Photographic Unit, with his jeep during Exercise 'Fabius', Hayling Island 6 May 1944

AFPU Number 5 Unit was formed during 1943, of 36 volunteers drawn from various regiments and led by Major Hugh Stewart. AFPU cameramen and photographers accompanied various army units in all theatres of action, including the Commandos, the Chindits, paratroopers, Special Air Service, Special Boat Squadron and the Long Range Desert Group. Ten AFPU members were attached to the main divisions during the Normandy landings in June 1944. Their recordings made during the campaign saw cameramen amongst the first waves ashore and then in the fighting inland.

AFPU recorded battles during the Italian campaign and across Western Europe including Monte Cassino, Liberation of Paris, Arnhem, the Rhine Crossing and the discovery of Belsen Concentration Camp.

== AFPU Number 9 Unit - Far East ==
In the Far East campaign, Number 9 Unit recorded the army in action in Burma and later made the documentary Burma Victory.

== Film stock ==
The AFPU used 35 mm black and white mute cine film, roughly 100 feet (30 m) long and lasted approximately 1 minute 20 seconds (at 24 frames per second). Sound effects and commentary were added later to recordings to prepare them for use as newsreels.

== Archive ==
The photographs and film recorded by members of the AFPU are archived by the Imperial War Museum.

== Memorial ==
A memorial at Pinewood Studios records those members of AFPU that were killed in action. The memorial also includes members of the RAF No. 1 Film Production Unit and there is also a memorial to AFPU members at the National Memorial Arboretum.

== See also ==
- Alan Whicker
