= Seagulls Over Sorrento (play) =

1949 play

- Written by: Hugh Hastings
- Original language: English
- Genre: War drama

Premiere
- Date premiered: 23 October 1949
- Place premiered: Comedy Theatre, London

Seagulls Over Sorrento is a play by Hugh Hastings, an Australian who had served in the Royal Navy during the Second World War.

It was first staged for a single performance at the Comedy Theatre in London's West End in 1949 before embarking on a lengthy run of 1,551 performances between 14 June 1950 and 13 March 1954 mainly at the Apollo Theatre and then transferring briefly to the Duchess Theatre. The West End cast included John Gregson (replaced by Gordon Jackson), Nigel Stock, Bernard Lee, Ronald Shiner and William Hartnell. Shiner and Hartnell, in particular, were singled out for praised by critics. A Broadway version ran for only 12 performances at the John Golden Theatre.

== Film adaptation ==
It was made into the 1954 film Seagulls Over Sorrento by MGM British (U.S.: Crest of the Wave), directed by Boulting Brothers and starring Gene Kelly, John Justin and Bernard Lee.

== Bibliography ==
- Goble, Alan. The Complete Index to Literary Sources in Film. Walter de Gruyter, 1999.
- Wearing, J.P. The London Stage 1950-1959: A Calendar of Productions, Performers, and Personnel. Rowman & Littlefield, 2014.
