= Frank Harvey (English screenwriter) =

English screenwriter (1912–1981)

Frank Harvey jr.

Frank Harvey (11 August 1912 – 6 November 1981) was an English screenwriter and playwright who jointly won a BAFTA Award with John Boulting and Alan Hackney for I'm All Right Jack in 1960. During his career he was nominated for a second BAFTA for Private's Progress.

== Biography ==
He was born on 11 August 1912 in Manchester, Lancashire, and died on 6 November 1981 in Ottery St. Mary, Devon. He was the third of three generations of writers who all took the non-de plume 'Frank Harvey', with both his grandfather, originally John Ainsworth Hilton, and his father taking the name when writing and performing for the stage.

His father, Harvey Ainsworth Hilton (1885–1965), was born in London, England, where he married Grace Ackerman, before moving with his family to Australia in 1914 and staying there until 1926. As Frank Harvey, Harvey Hilton was an actor and a playwright, producing four plays including The Last Enemy (1929) and Cape Forlorn (1930).

Harvey junior spent part of his childhood in Australia. Upon returning to Britain, he attended Wellington College, Berkshire, and St Catharine's College, Cambridge, where he read English and received a lower-second class degree in 1934. While at Cambridge, Harvey began acting with the Festival Theatre under the auspices of Joseph Macleod, later moving into writing.

As well as writing, in November 1947 Harvey produced The Moon in the Yellow River by Denis Johnston at the Arts Theatre, London, starring Jack Hawkins.

== Personal ==
Frank Harvey married Margaret Inchbold, the great niece of the Pre-Raphaelite painter John William Inchbold, on 21 December 1936. They had two sons. He had a half-sister, Helen, from his father's second marriage to Helen Rosamond 'Bobbie' McMillan, daughter of Sir William McMillan, Minister for Railways in New South Wales, Australia.

== Filmography ==
Screenwriter

- The Day After the Fair (Play) (TV Movie) (1986)
- I'm All Right Jack (1960)
- Private's Progress (1956)
- Heavens Above! (1963)
- The 39 Steps (1959)
- Seven Days to Noon (1950)
- The Long Memory (1953)
- Brothers in Law (1957)
- The Day After the Fair (TV Movie) (1974)
- No, My Darling Daughter (1961)
- The World in My Pocket (1961)
- Upstairs and Downstairs (1959)
- Danger Within (1959)
- Josephine and Men (Script and additional scenes) (1955)
- Seagulls Over Sorrento (1954)
- High Treason (1951)
- The Poltergeist (TV Movie) (1950)
- The Chertsey Apprentice (TV Movie) (1956)
- Elizabeth of Ladymead (1949)
- Portrait from Life (1949)
- My Brother's Keeper (1948)
- The True Glory (Documentary) (1945)
- Burma Victory (Documentary) (1946)
- It Happened One Sunday (1944)
- Saloon Bar (1940)

Actor

- The Young Idea (1934) Festival Theatre, Cambridge
- Road to Moscow (Narrator) (1944)
- The Unthinking Lobster (1948) BBC TV
- High Treason (1951)

== Plays ==
- Saloon Bar (1939)
- Brighton Rock (1943)
- The Poltergeist (1946)
- Elizabeth of Ladymead (1948)
- The Non-Resident (1950)
- The Chertsey Apprentice (1952)
- Norman (1963)
- The Day After the Fair (1972)

== Television ==
- Teatro de siempre (TV Series) (1 episode) (1978)
- Estudio 1 (TV Series) (1 episode) (1982)
- ITV Television Playhouse (TV Series) (1 episode) (1957)
