= Pink String and Sealing Wax =

1945 film by Robert Hamer

- Directed by: Robert Hamer
- Written by: Robert Hamer (script contribution)
- Screenplay by: Diana Morgan
- Based on: Pink String and Sealing Wax (play) by Roland Pertwee
- Produced by: Michael Balcon
- Starring: Mervyn Johns
- Cinematography: Stanley Pavey
- Edited by: Michael Truman
- Music by: Norman Demuth
- Color process: Black and white
- Production company: Ealing Studios
- Distributed by: Eagle-Lion Distrib. Ltd
- Release dates: 20 November 1945 (London); 7 January 1946 (UK)
- Running time: 90 minutes
- Country: United Kingdom
- Language: English
- Budget: $620,000

Pink String and Sealing Wax is a 1945 British drama film directed by Robert Hamer and starring Mervyn Johns. It was written by Diana Morgan and Hamer based on the play with the same title by Roland Pertwee. It was the first feature film Robert Hamer directed on his own.

The title derives from the practice of pharmacists in the Victorian and Edwardian age of wrapping drugs in a package sealed with pink string and sealing wax to show the package had not been tampered with.

== Summary ==
The story is set in Brighton in 1880. Pharmacist Edward Sutton is a strict, arbitrary father. He scolds his son David for writing love verses instead of seeing to business. He tries to prevent his daughter Victoria from training as a professional singer. He dismisses Peggy, his younger daughter, for her objections to his vivisection of guinea pigs. After supper, David reacts to his dad's disciplinary manner by visiting a local pub. While there, he overhears two women gossiping about the landlord's wife, Pearl, and her liaison with another man. Later, David, feeling tipsy, bumps into Pearl outside and engages her in conversation. By the time he arrives home, he is barely sober enough to prepare for bed.

One evening, Victoria and Peggy, forbidden from seeing a popular opera star's concert, wait outside her stage door. Victoria gains her attention by singing "There's No Place Like Home." Impressed, the star invites them to supper and arranges for Victoria to audition at London's Royal College of Music. Peggy helps Victoria collect money for her train fare. Her audition is a success and she receives a full scholarship offer. But Mr Sutton objects. He admits the award may pay for her tuition, but he will not allow a penny for her food and lodging. Mrs Sutton suggests her own funds could support Victoria, but her husband points out that according to law, that money belongs to him, and she has no say in the matter. She sorrowfully responds that his own children fear him. Then to Sutton's shock, she further states that were it not for the ages of David and Peggy, she would leave him.

Meanwhile, David takes Pearl to the pharmacy to treat a cut she got from Joe, her abusive husband. David tends to her injury and warns her of tetanus. He discusses the various poisons on the shelf, especially strychnine, some of which Pearl secures while David is out of the room fetching her a glass of milk. Pearl returns to the bar and is told Joe has collapsed drunk and sleeps upstairs. Alone with the slumbering Joe, Pearl cuts his hand with a razor. When she finally poisons him, she is shocked by the ferocity of his death. After Joe's burial, she assumes the matter is ended, but a police inspector informs Pearl that her husband's body is to be exhumed for a post mortem.

Pearl attempts to avoid suspicion. She visits Mr Sutton and claims David gave her the poison but said it was to "put Joe off the drink" and that unless Mr Sutton records death from tetanus, Pearl will make sure David hangs for murder. Sutton sees through her ruse and reveals that it was his expert opinion to the police that caused her dead husband's exhumation in the first place. After Pearl departs, Sutton listens to his son patiently as he explains the truth of what happened. Mr Sutton then visits Pearl, informing her David is even now speaking to the police. She is at first furious, then starts to weep, but gets little sympathy from Sutton. Afterwards, she wanders in a daze to the outer edge of the promenade and throws herself over a railing on to the rocks below.

== Cast ==
- Mervyn Johns as Mr Edward Sutton
- Mary Merrall as Mrs Ellen Sutton
- Gordon Jackson as David Sutton
- Jean Ireland as Victoria Sutton
- Sally Ann Howes as Margaret "Peggy" Sutton
- Colin Simpson as James Sutton
- David Wallbridge as Nicholas Sutton
- Googie Withers as Pearl Bond
- John Carol as Dan Powell
- Catherine Lacey as Miss Porter the gossip
- Garry Marsh as Joe Bond
- Pauline Letts as Louise
- Maudie Edwards as Mrs Webster
- Frederick Piper as Dr Pepper
- John Owers as Frank, a barman
- Helen Goss as Maudie, a barmaid
- Margaret Ritchie as Madame Adelina Patti
- Don Stannard as John Bevan
- John Ruddock as Judge
- Ronald Adam as Clerk of the Court
- Charles Carson as Editor
- Valentine Dyall as Police Inspector
- David Keir as Stage Door Keeper

== Release ==
The film premiered in London on 3 December 1945 at the Tivoli Cinema on The Strand and the Marble Arch Pavilion.

== Reception ==
The critic in The Times praised Googie Withers and Gordon Jackson for their roles, and concluded that Robert Hamer, "has made, in spite of occasional lapses and longueurs, a promising beginning as a director."
