= Double Alibi (1937 film) =

1937 British film by David MacDonald

- Directed by: David MacDonald
- Written by: Edward Dryhurst; Harold Weston
- Starring: Ernest Sefton; John Warwick; Paul Neville; Linden Travers
- Cinematography: Stanley Grant
- Edited by: Peter Tanner
- Production company: Fox Film Company
- Distributed by: Fox Film Company
- Release date: February 1937
- Running time: 40 minutes
- Country: United Kingdom
- Language: English

Double Alibi is a 1937 British crime film directed by David MacDonald and starring Ernest Sefton, John Warwick and Linden Travers. It was made at Wembley Studios as a quota quickie by the British subsidiary of the Hollywood studio Fox.

== Plot ==
The seemingly watertight alibi of a criminal is wrecked by the testimony of a woman connected with a rival gang.

== Cast ==
- Ernest Sefton as Crayshaw
- John Warwick as Charlie
- Paul Neville as Dawkin
- Linden Travers as Rita
- Mavis Villiers as Miss Grant
- Margaret Scudamore as Mrs. Havilland
- Charles Eaton as Davidson
- Eric Hales as Chauffeur

== Bibliography ==
- Chibnall, Steve. Quota Quickies: The British of the British 'B' Film. British Film Institute, 2007.
- Low, Rachael. Filmmaking in 1930s Britain. George Allen & Unwin, 1985.
- Wood, Linda. British Films, 1927-1939. British Film Institute, 1986.
