= Almost a Gentleman (1938 film) =

1938 film by Oswald Mitchell

- Billy Bennett and Marcelle Rogez in the film
- Directed by: Oswald Mitchell
- Written by: Oswald Mitchell; Sidney Morgan; Willie Singer
- Produced by: Sidney Morgan
- Starring: Billy Bennett; Kathleen Harrison; Gibb McLaughlin; Marcelle Rogez
- Cinematography: Geoffrey Faithfull
- Production company: Sidney Morgan Productions
- Distributed by: Butcher's Film Service
- Release date: June 1938
- Country: United Kingdom
- Language: English
- Budget: £12,912

Almost a Gentleman is a 1938 British comedy film directed by Oswald Mitchell and starring Billy Bennett, Kathleen Harrison, and Gibb McLaughlin. It was written by Mitchell, Sidney Morgan and Willie Singer. It was re-issued in shortened form in 1940.

== Preservation status ==
The British Film Institute National Archive holds no stills or ephemera, and no film or video materials.

== Premise ==
A night watchman is mistaken for a wealthy financier.

== Cast ==
- Billy Bennett as Bill Barker
- Kathleen Harrison as Mrs Barker
- Gibb McLaughlin as Bartholomew Quist
- Marcelle Rogez as Mimi
- Mervyn Johns as Percival Clicker
- Basil Langton as Andrew Sinker
- Harry Terry as Jim
- Dorothy Vernon as Mrs Garrett

== Reception ==
The Monthly Film Bulletin wrote: "Crook comedy extravaganza. ... The whole of this robust and boisterous show revolves round Billy Bennett. His music hall 'fans' will delight to find that he takes to the medium of the cinema as a duck to water. With exuberant humour and immense gusto he puts over a series of gags and patter, interspersed with monologues in characteristic manner. ... The whole thing has a naiveté, and a homely vulgarity which disarm criticism. Kathleen Harrison gives a clever study of a bewildered but not helpless Cockney wife, and Gibb McLaughlin is adequately sinister as the crooked share-pusher. But it is Billy sennett's film all the way."

Kine Weekly wrote: "The presentation and direction are, at times, a trifle haphazard, but Billy Bennett who, incidentally, is both the pivot and mainspring of the boisterous show, is in great form. His fruity, exuberant humour, backed up by an enthusiastic supporting cast, not only holds the picture together, but generously endows it with hearty laughs."
