= Boulting brothers =

English twin brothers and filmmakers

John and Roy Boulting
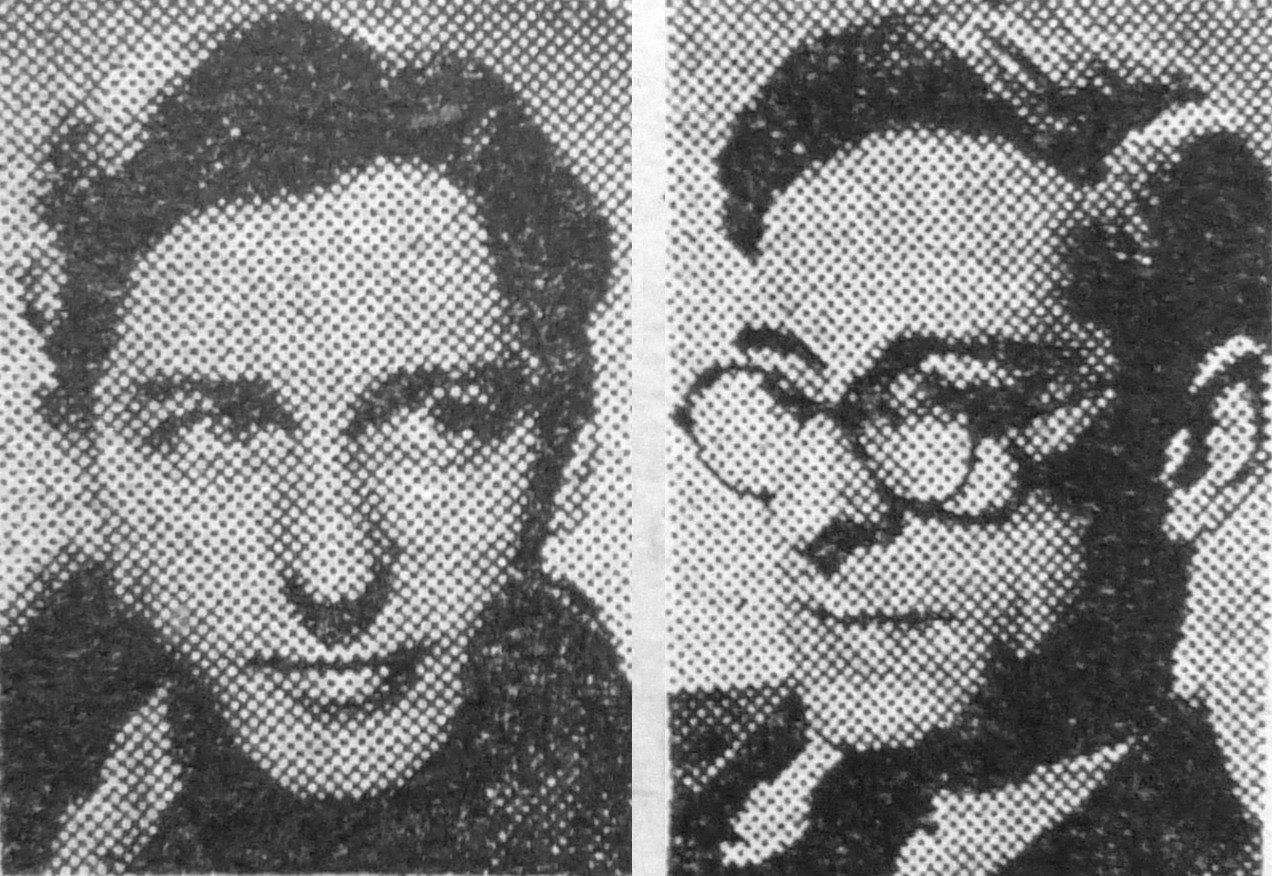
- Roy (left) and John (right) Boulting in 1952
- Born: Joseph Edward John Boulting; 21 December 1913 Alfred Fitzroy Clarence Boulting; 21 December 1913; Bray, Berkshire, England
- Died: John: 17 June 1985 (aged 71); Sunningdale, Berkshire, England Roy: 5 November 2001 (aged 87); Eynsham, Oxfordshire, England
- Other name: Collectively: Boulting brothers John: John Edward Boulting Roy: Roy Alfred Clarence Boulting
- Occupations: Film producers and directors
- Spouses: John: Veronica Davidson (m. 1938, divorced) Jacqueline Duncan (m. 1952; div. 1966) Ann Marion (m. 1972, divorced) Anne Josephine (m. 1977) Roy: Angela Warnock (m. 1936; div. 1941) Jean Capon (m. 1942; div. 1951) Enid Munnik (m. 1951; div. 1964) Hayley Mills (m. 1971; div. 1977) Sandra Spencer (m. 1978; div. 1984)
- Partner: Roy: Victoria Vaughan (mid-1960s)
- Children: John: 6 Roy: 7, including Crispian Mills

John Edward Boulting (21 December 1913 – 17 June 1985) and Roy Alfred Clarence Boulting (21 December 1913 – 5 November 2001), known collectively as the Boulting brothers, were English filmmakers and identical twins who became known for their series of satirical comedies in the 1950s and 1960s. They produced many of their films through their own production company, Charter Film Productions, which they founded in 1937.

== Early life ==
The twin brothers were born to Arthur Boulting and his wife Rosetta (Rose) née Bennett in Bray, Berkshire, England, on 21 December 1913. John was the elder by half an hour. John was named Joseph Edward John Boulting and Roy was named Alfred Fitzroy Clarence Boulting. Their elder brother Sydney Boulting became an actor and stage producer as Peter Cotes; he was the original director of The Mousetrap. A younger brother, Guy, died aged eight.

Both twins were educated at Reading School, where they formed a film society. They were extras in Anthony Asquith's 1931 film Tell England while still at school.

As a teenager, Roy emigrated to Canada, working for a while as a shop assistant, but also writing dialogue for at least one Canadian film. He worked his passage home aboard a cattle freighter in about 1933, working first in film sales before moving into film production as assistant director on a 1936 comedy quickie Apron Fools. The money he made on his passage home went to finance the brothers' first work, a short entitled Ripe Earth (1938), about the village of Thaxted, Essex, narrated by Leo Genn.

From January to November 1937, John served on the Republican side in the Spanish Civil War as an ambulance driver with the Spanish Medical Aid Committee (not, as sometimes reported, with the International Brigades), where — according to Richard Attenborough — he was nearly captured. John also served with the British Film Unit as an officer in the Royal Air Force during the Second World War. Roy served as a captain in the British Army, first with a tank regiment for more than a year and then with the Army Film Unit, where he made several short documentaries.

== Careers ==
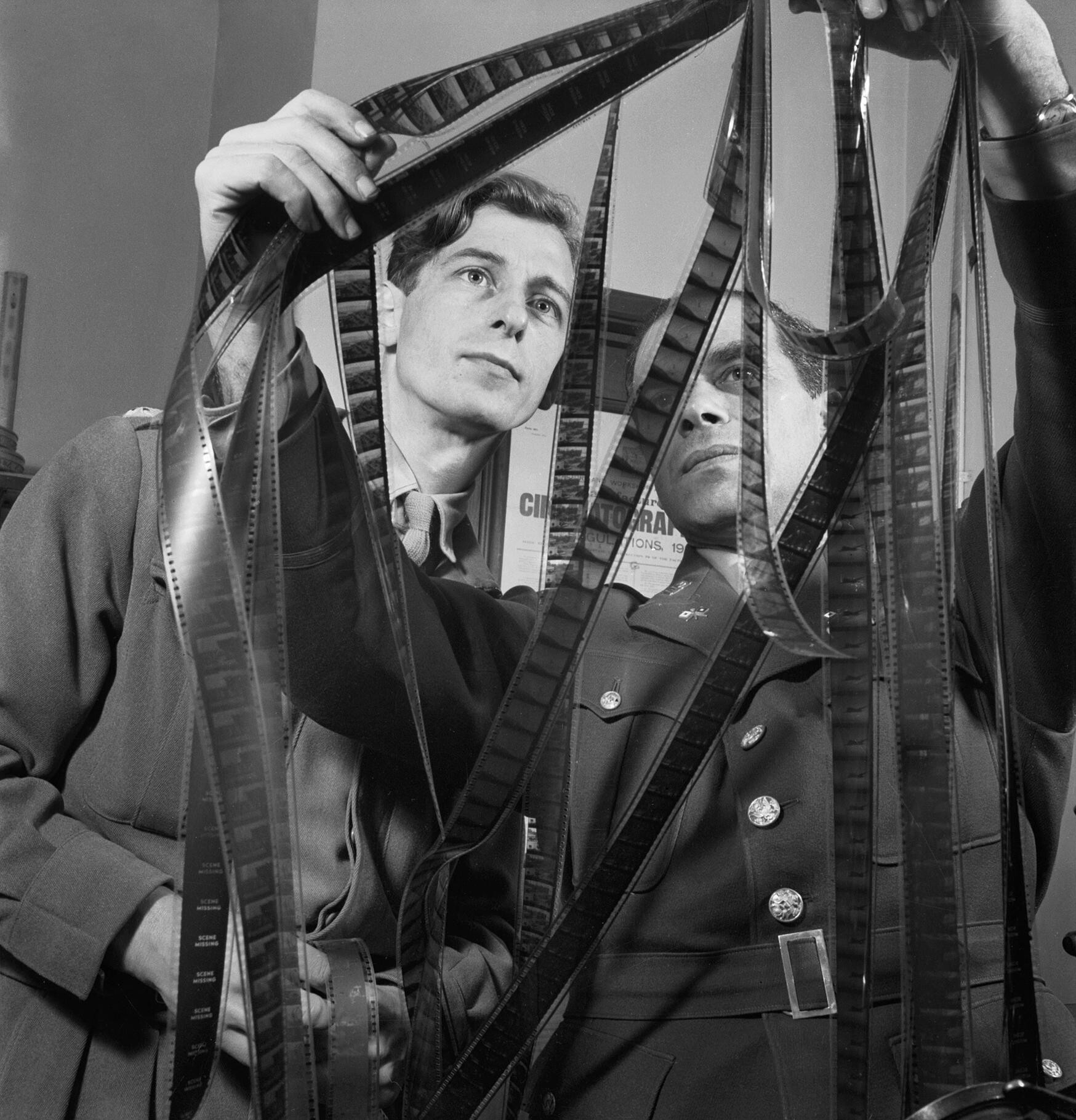
Frank Capra (right) confers with Roy Boulting on the editing of the film Tunisian Victory

The brothers constituted a producer-director team. For most of their careers one produced while the other directed, but the product remained essentially a 'Boulting Brothers film'. They were socialists, as John demonstrated with his involvement in the Spanish Civil War (see above), and wanted all film, including comedies, to reflect the real world.

=== Charter Film Productions ===
In 1937, they set up Charter Film Productions and made several short features, including The Landlady (1937) and Consider Your Verdict (1938), which attracted critical and commercial attention.

They made quota quickies such as Trunk Crime (1939) and Inquest (1939).

=== Feature films ===
Being eager to speak out against the Third Reich, the brothers made their film, Pastor Hall (1940), a biopic of Martin Niemöller, a German preacher who refused to kowtow to the Nazis. Roy directed and John produced. The film had to have its initial release delayed by the British Government, which was not yet ready to be openly critical of Nazism. Once released, the film was well received by the critics and the public.

They followed up with Thunder Rock (1942) with Michael Redgrave, a passionate anti-isolationist allegory distinguished by imaginative cinematography and a theatrical but highly atmospheric lighthouse setting. It was financed by MGM.

=== Military service ===
In 1941, Roy joined the Army Film Unit, where he was responsible for Desert Victory, which won the Academy Award for Best Documentary in 1944. He also worked on Tunisian Victory (1944) and Burma Victory (1945). John joined the RAF Film Unit, where he made Journey Together in 1945, a dramatised documentary about the training and combat experience of a bomber crew with Richard Attenborough in the lead part. Terence Rattigan worked on the script.

=== Post-war films ===
After the war, the Boultings made the drama Fame Is the Spur (1947) with Redgrave. More successful at the box-office was Brighton Rock (1947), starring Attenborough as the gangster "Pinkie" from the novel by Graham Greene. Also well liked was The Guinea Pig (1948), starring Richard Attenborough as a young working-class boy sent to a public school. It was made for Pilgrim Pictures who the Boultings left shortly afterwards. The Boultings co-directed the thriller Seven Days to Noon (1950), which won an Oscar for Best Story. It led to a less popular sequel, High Treason (1951). John directed The Magic Box (1951), a biopic of William Friese-Greene and a film containing numerous cameo appearances. It was shown at the 1951 Festival of Britain but on general release the following year proved a box office disappointment.

=== Hollywood-financed films ===
Roy received an offer to direct a World War Two naval film, Sailor of the King (1953), starring Jeffrey Hunter for 20th Century Fox. Seagulls Over Sorrento (1954) was another war naval story financed by a Hollywood studio (in this case MGM) with an imported star (Gene Kelly); it was not a big success. The brothers collaborated on a comedy, Josephine and Men (1955) then Roy was hired by United Artists to do an action film with Hollywood stars, Run for the Sun (1956).

=== Satires ===
In the mid-50s, the Boulting brothers became identified with "affectionate" satires on British institutions. The sequence began with John's Private's Progress (1956), a look at army life, starring Attenborough, Terry-Thomas and Ian Carmichael and co written by Frank Harvey. It was the second most commercially successful film in Britain in 1956.

They followed it with Lucky Jim (1957), set in academe, adapted from the novel by Kingsley Amis. It starred Carmichael and Terry-Thomas. Brothers in Law (1957) with Carmichael, Attenborough and Thomas, took on the legal profession. They had a break from satirising institutions with Happy Is the Bride (1958), an adaptation of Quiet Wedding, then returned to it with Carlton-Browne of the F.O. (1959), focusing on diplomacy.

The Boultings took on increasingly powerful trade unions and ever corrupt board room power with I'm All Right Jack (1959), a sequel to Private's Progress with Carmichael, Thomas and Attenborough reprising their roles, and Harvey co-writing. The film featured a performance by Peter Sellers as trade union foreman Fred Kite. It was the most popular film at the British box office in 1959. Suspect (1960) was a return to the thriller genre for the brothers. A French Mistress (1960) was a comedy farce. Heavens Above! (1963) looked at religion in Britain, starring Sellers and Carmichael. It was a minor hit. Rotten to the Core (1965) was a heist comedy which attempted to make a star of Anton Rodgers in a Peter Sellers-type role, playing multiple parts. It featured a young Charlotte Rampling.

=== Hayley Mills ===
The Boultings directed and produced the northern comedy The Family Way (1966), starring John Mills and his teenage daughter Hayley. Roy Boulting and Hayley Mills began a relationship during the shoot despite a 33-year age difference; they married in 1971. Roy wrote and directed Twisted Nerve (1968), a thriller starring Mills and Hywel Bennett. The brothers had a massive hit with There's a Girl in My Soup (1970) starring Sellers and Goldie Hawn. Roy was called in to replace the director on Mr. Forbush and the Penguins (1971), and he brought in Mills to star. The movie was not successful. Neither was the comedy Soft Beds, Hard Battles (1974) made by the brothers starring Peter Sellers. Roy Boulting lost a considerable amount of money on the film. In 1975, Roy was working on a stage play, The Family Games. He worked on the script for The Kingfisher Caper (1975), starring Mills.

=== Later career ===
In the US, Roy directed The Last Word (1979), a comedy starring Richard Harris that was barely seen. When John died of cancer in 1985, Roy stopped making films. His last credit was directing an episode of the Miss Marple series for TV, The Moving Finger (1985). He was working on an adaptation of Terence Rattigan's play Deja Vu when he died. When the National Film Theatre mounted its biggest retrospective to date of British cinema in the late 1980s, Roy who launched it, introduced Desert Victory. The Boulting Brother's films have been described as being "a sensitive barometer of the changing times".

== Personal lives ==
John Boulting was married four times. He had six children: two sons by his first marriage; three daughters by his second. He also had a third son. With his first wife, Veronica, daughter of Irish barrister, John Craig Nelson Davidson, he had sons Norris (b. 1941) and Nicholas (b. 1943). Norris is the father of TV presenter and journalist Ned Boulting. With his second wife, Jacqueline (Jackie), he had three daughters: Jody, Emma and Lucy; the last of whom, Lucy Boulting Hill, has become a successful casting director. John's grandson, Jordan Stephens (son of Emma), is one half of British hip hop duo Rizzle Kicks.

Roy Boulting was married five times. He had seven children, all sons: two by his second marriage; three by his third; one through his relationship with Victoria Vaughan; and one by his fourth. With his second wife, Jean Capon (née Gamage), he had sons Jonathan (b. 1944) and Laurence (b. 1945), the latter becoming a successful film producer and director in his own right. With his second marriage, in March 1951, to Enid Munnik (née Groenewald/Grünewald), he had three children: first, Fitzroy (b. 1951); then identical twins Edmund and Rupert (b. 1952). The couple divorced in 1964. Enid, an established fashion model and later fashion editor at the French magazine Elle, married the 9th Earl of Hardwicke in April 1970. The model and actress Ingrid Boulting is Enid's daughter from her first marriage, to Cornelius Munnik.

Following his split with his third wife, Roy entered into a relationship with another fashion model, Victoria Vaughan. They had one son together. The relationship ended with his involvement with Hayley Mills. In 1971, Roy married, for the fourth time, Hayley Mills, 33 years his junior, whom he had met on the set of The Family Way. Their son is musician and filmmaker Crispian Mills. The couple separated in 1975, and divorced in 1977. His fifth and final marriage, in October 1978, was to actress Sandra Payne. They divorced in 1984.

== Deaths ==
John Boulting died on 17 June 1985 at his home in Sunningdale, Berkshire, and Roy Boulting 16 years later on 5 November 2001 in the Radcliffe Infirmary, Oxford; both died of cancer.

== In popular culture ==
A still from The Family Way was used for The Smiths single "I Started Something I Couldn't Finish".

== Filmography ==
=== Films directed jointly ===
- Seven Days to Noon (1950)
- Suspect / The Risk (1960)
- Heavens Above! (1963)

=== Films directed by John ===
- Journey Together (1945)
- Brighton Rock (1948)
- The Magic Box (1951)
- Private's Progress (1956)
- Lucky Jim (1957)
- I'm All Right Jack (1959)
- Rotten to the Core (1965)

=== Films directed by Roy ===
- Trunk Crime (1939)
- Inquest (1939)
- Pastor Hall (1940)
- Thunder Rock (1942)
- Tunisian Victory (1944, documentary co-directed with Frank Capra)
- Fame Is the Spur (1947)
- The Guinea Pig (1948)
- High Treason (1951)
- Single-Handed (1953)
- Seagulls Over Sorrento (1954)
- Josephine and Men (1955)
- Run for the Sun (1956)
- Brothers in Law (1957)
- Happy Is the Bride (1958)
- Carlton-Browne of the F.O. (1959)
- A French Mistress (1960)
- The Family Way (1966)
- Twisted Nerve (1968)
- There's a Girl in My Soup (1970)
- Mr. Forbush and the Penguins (1971)
- Soft Beds, Hard Battles (1973)
- The Last Word (1979)

== See also ==
- List of twins
