= Burma Victory =

1945 film by Roy Boulting

Burma Victory is a 1945 British documentary about the Burma Campaign during World War II. It was directed by Roy Boulting. The accompanying music is by Alan Rawsthorne.

== Production ==
The film was a project of Louis Mountbatten. It was originally meant to be a US-British co-production but neither side could agree on what emphasis to place on the film. The Americans then made their own documentary.

It features Mountbatten talking to his men and officers and footage of General Slim, Merrill's Marauders, the Chindits etc. Apart from war footage, it covers the Burmese monsoon and local traditions. More unusual sequences include a massive construction exercise of transport ships for use on the Irrawaddy river near Mandalay, which led to the capture of Mandalay. Forces then converge on Rangoon, which allowed the release of British prisoners. As Japan surrenders, the guns fall silent.

== Reception ==
According to Kinematograph Weekly, the film performed well at the British box office in 1945.
