= Adventure in Iraq =

1943 film by D. Ross Lederman

- Poster
- Directed by: D. Ross Lederman
- Written by: George Bilson
- Based on: The Green Goddess by William Archer
- Produced by: William Jacobs
- Starring: John Loder and Ruth Ford.
- Cinematography: James Van Trees
- Edited by: Clarence Kolster
- Music by: Heinz Roemheld
- Distributed by: Warner Bros. Pictures
- Release date: September 27, 1943
- Country: United States
- Language: English
- Budget: $130,000
- Box office: $147,000

Adventure in Iraq is a 1943 American adventure film directed by D. Ross Lederman and starring John Loder, Ruth Ford, Warren Douglas and Paul Cavanagh. The film is based on the 1921 play The Green Goddess by William Archer.

== Plot ==
Three Americans flying a small plane to Cairo, Egypt, are forced by engine failure to land in Iraq and are taken prisoner by an Arab chieftain.

== Cast ==
- John Loder as George Torrence
- Ruth Ford as Tess Torrence
- Warren Douglas as Doug Everett
- Paul Cavanagh as Sheik Ahmid Bel Nor
- Barry Bernard as Devins
- Peggy Carson as Timah Devins
- Martin Garralaga as High Priest
- Bill Crago as Air Force Capt. Carson
- John George as Small Iraqi in Courtyard
- Manuel López as Tall Priest in Courtyard
- Bill Edwards as Air Force Sergeant

== Production ==
The film was made by Warner Bros. Pictures as a programmer. It was a remake of Archer's play The Green Goddess, updating the action to modern Iraq. It encountered strong objections from the OWI, who charged that its plot was unintentionally both anti-British and anti-Arab and was potentially offensive to America's ally and to neutral Arab countries. The film was already granted an export licence, but pressure from the State Department overrode this. Consequently, it was the only Warners' film not to receive an overseas release during the 1940s.

== Reception ==
Writing in Turner Classic Movies, critic Frank Miller noted that, "Warner Bros. had no problem re-making The Green Goddess, the twice-filmed tale of a duplicitous, lustful Himalayan Raja, as Adventure in Iraq, the tale of a duplicitous, lustful Iraqi sheikh. In truth, the writers seem to have expended more effort updating the story to World War II than they did changing the location and the villain's cultural background." He also described the film as "hardly an A-picture" with a cast "made up of low-budget veterans." A review of the film by Craig Butler in AllMovie noted that "the plot is overly familiar and not especially believable. Dialogue is of the cliched and stilted variety, and the characters have stock written all over them. David Ross Lederman's by the book direction doesn't help matters."

The film earned $147,000 domestically and did not earn anything outside the US because it was not released there.

== Bibliography ==
- Glancy, H. Mark. When Hollywood Loved Britain: The Hollywood 'British' Film 1939-1945. Manchester University Press, 1999.
