= Lewis Waller =

English actor and theatre manager (1860–1915)

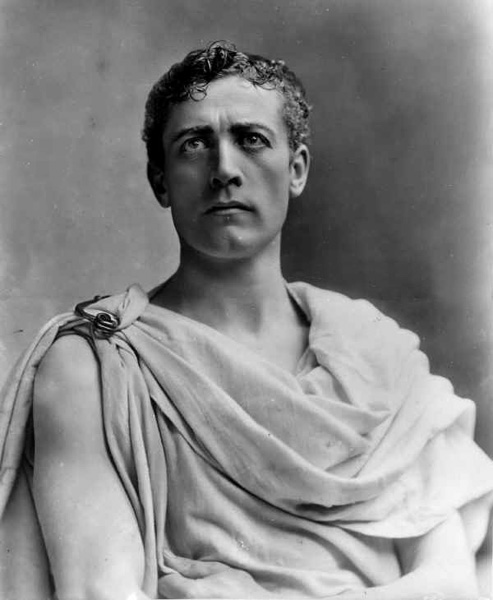
Waller as Brutus in Julius Caesar, 1898

William Waller Lewis (3 November 1860 – 1 November 1915), known on stage as Lewis Waller, was an English actor and theatre manager, well known on the London stage and in the English provinces.

After early stage experience with J. L. Toole's and Helena Modjeska's companies from 1883, Waller became known, by the late 1880s, for romantic leads, both in Shakespeare and in popular costume dramas of the Victorian and Edwardian eras. He attracted a large number of female admirers, who formed themselves into a vocal and conspicuous fan club. He also tried his hand at management of tours in 1885 and 1893 and then became an actor-manager at the Theatre Royal, Haymarket in the mid-1890s. After the turn of the century, he returned to management, and remained an actor-manager for the rest of his career, both in London and on tour.

Despite his commercial success in such parts as the title roles in Booth Tarkington's Monsieur Beaucaire and Arthur Conan Doyle's Brigadier Gerard, Waller greatly preferred acting in Shakespeare, in which his roles ranged from Romeo to Othello. Among the roles he created was Sir Robert Chiltern in Oscar Wilde's 1895 comedy An Ideal Husband.

== Life and career ==
=== Early years ===
Waller as Orlando, 1885

Waller was born in Bilbao, Spain, the eldest son of an English civil engineer, William James Lewis, and his wife, Carlotta née Vyse. He was educated at King's College School in south west London, after which, intending to pursue a commercial career, he studied languages on the continent. From 1879 to 1883 he was a clerk in a London firm owned by his uncle. In 1882 he married Florence Isabella Brandon (1858–1912), who shortly afterwards became a professional actress under the name of Florence West. They had a son and a daughter.

After acting in amateur performances, Waller decided to make a career on the stage and was engaged by J. L. Toole in 1883. His first role was the Hon. Claude Lorrimer in H. J. Byron's Uncle Dick's Darling, in which he was billed as "Waller Lewis". By May of the same year, he had adopted the stage name Lewis Waller. In that month he appeared at the Theatre Royal, Drury Lane, in a charity matinee for the Actors' Benevolent Fund with Toole's company and such contemporary stars as Rutland Barrington, Lionel Brough, Arthur Cecil, Nellie Farren, George Grossmith, Henry Irving and Ellen Terry. He remained in Toole's company for a year, playing light comedy and juvenile parts. He joined a touring company, playing the central role, the blind Gilbert Vaughan, in Called Back by Hugh Conway, dramatised by J. Comyns Carr. He returned to London in March 1885 to play at the Lyceum Theatre in Helena Modjeska's company, as the Abbé in Adrienne Lecouvreur, and then toured with her, playing such roles as Mortimer in Mary Stuart and Orlando in As You Like It; The Manchester Guardian said of the latter that he "kept Orlando properly ingenuous, and made him a taking and gallant young wooer."

Towards the end of 1885, Waller ventured into management for the first time, touring a production of Called Back, switching to the role of Dr. Basil North, in which The Manchester Guardian thought him "a trifle too melodramatic". The tour was modestly successful, but not such as to lead Waller to mount further productions for the moment.

=== West End roles ===
Waller in An Ideal Husband

Waller returned to the West End, working for a succession of managements. At the Strand Theatre in early 1887, he played Roy Carlton in Jack-in-the-Box, which his biographer in the Oxford Dictionary of National Biography describes as his first substantial success in London. At the Opera Comique he played Ernest Vane in Masks and Faces and Captain Absolute in The Rivals; and at the Gaiety Theatre he played Jacques Rosney in Civil War.

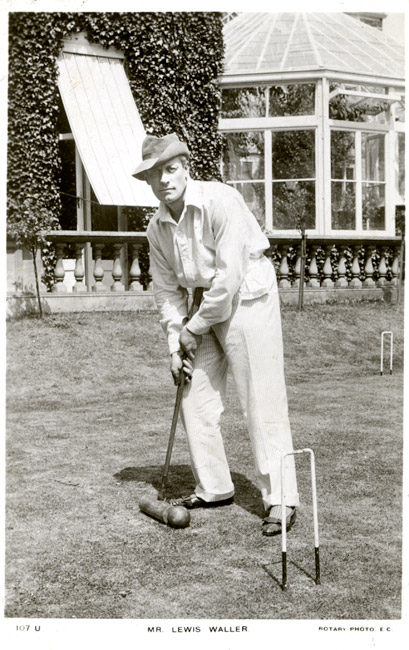
Waller playing croquet

Waller then joined William Hunter Kendal and John Hare at the St. James's Theatre, where he played the Duc de Bligny in The Ironmaster, Sir George Barclay in Lady Clancarty, and Lord Arden in The Wife's Secret. When Rutland Barrington took over the management of the St. James's in 1888, Waller played George Sabine in The Dean's Daughter and Ralph Crampton in Brantinghame Hall. Rudolph de Cordova, in a 1909 biographical sketch notes, "During this period, few theatres played regular afternoon performances, so that the actors were, for the most part, engaged only in the evening. Many matinees were, however, given to introduce new plays and new players; and in this way Mr. Waller acted a large number of new parts, all of an ephemeral character." In particular he played several Ibsen roles in these matinees in the early 1890s, bringing him to the attention of people of influence in the theatre such as William Archer, Jacob Grein and Bernard Shaw. Waller played Oswald in Ghosts, Lovborg in Hedda Gabler, Rosmer in Rosmersholm and Solness in The Master Builder. The ODNB comments that Archer was "delighted that an established West End actor had contributed to the Ibsen revival but was aware that Waller could overcome neither the plays' inadequate rehearsal period nor his background of florid West End performances."

In October 1893 Waller returned to management, mounting a tour of Wilde's A Woman of No Importance, in which he played Lord Illingworth and his wife played Mrs Arbuthnot. The Manchester Guardian called it "a tolerable travelling company in which nobody gains great distinction." Returning to London, Waller, in partnership with H. H. Morrell, leased the Theatre Royal, Haymarket while its regular tenant, Herbert Beerbohm Tree was on tour in the US. He began with the premiere of Wilde's An Ideal Husband, playing Sir Robert Chiltern in a cast that included his wife as Mrs. Cheveley, Julia Neilson as Lady Chiltern and Charles Hawtrey as Lord Goring. Waller and Morrell remained in management until 1897, when Tree invited Waller to join his company at the newly rebuilt Her Majesty's Theatre.

Waller remained with Tree for three years, playing a wide range of roles, including romantic leads in popular costume dramas and, in Tree's lavish Shakespeare productions, Laertes in Hamlet, Brutus in Julius Caesar, Faulconbridge in King John and Lysander in A Midsummer Night's Dream.

=== Twentieth century ===
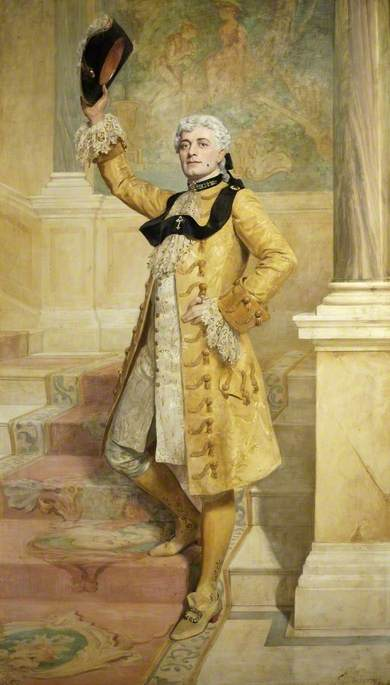
Waller as Monsieur Beaucaire by John Collier, 1903

After leaving Tree's company, Waller returned to management, and remained an actor-manager for the rest of his career. Although he loved playing Shakespeare, adding the roles of Romeo, Othello and Henry V to his repertoire, for commercial reasons he was best known as the star of swashbuckling romances. He was particularly identified with the title roles in the stage versions of Booth Tarkington's Monsieur Beaucaire and Arthur Conan Doyle's Brigadier Gerard. He starred in a film of the latter in 1915.

The critic Hesketh Pearson praised Waller for "his good looks [and] his virile acting and his vibrant voice" which "rang through the theatre like a bell and stirred like a trumpet". Waller had a large following of enthusiastic women fans, who formed a club known as the K.O.W. [Keen On Waller] Brigade. Pearson lamented, "the puerile nature of the plays he usually put on, and the adolescent behaviour of his female admirers, prevented many people from appreciating his superb gift as a declaimer of Shakespeare's rhetoric, and frequently exposed him to ridicule."

In 1911 and 1912, Waller made a tour of the US, Canada and Australia. In his absence his wife died. His last play was May Martindale's Gamblers All, which opened at Wyndham's Theatre, London in June 1915, with Gerald du Maurier and Madge Titheradge co-starring. The Manchester Guardian called the production "a personal acting triumph for Lewis Waller". After the West End run, Waller took the play on tour, during which he contracted pneumonia, from which he died in Nottingham two days short of his 55th birthday.

== Recordings ==
Waller made a small number of recordings for the Gramophone Company:

Recorded 3 January 1907:

- 1351: "Charge of the Light Brigade" (Tennyson) (matrix 9641b)
- 1359: Speech from Henry V (Shakespeare) (matrix 9639b)
- 1360: "The Ballad of the 'Clampherdown'" (Kipling) (matrix 9640b)
- 1361: "Snarleyow" (Kipling) (matrix 9640b)

Recorded 4 August 1911:

- 1442: Henry V at Harfleur from Henry V (Shakespeare) (matrix y13914e), also issued on E164
- 1443: "Charge of the Light Brigade" (Tennyson) (matrix y13915e), also issued on E164
