= The Green Goddess (play) =

1921 play by William Archer

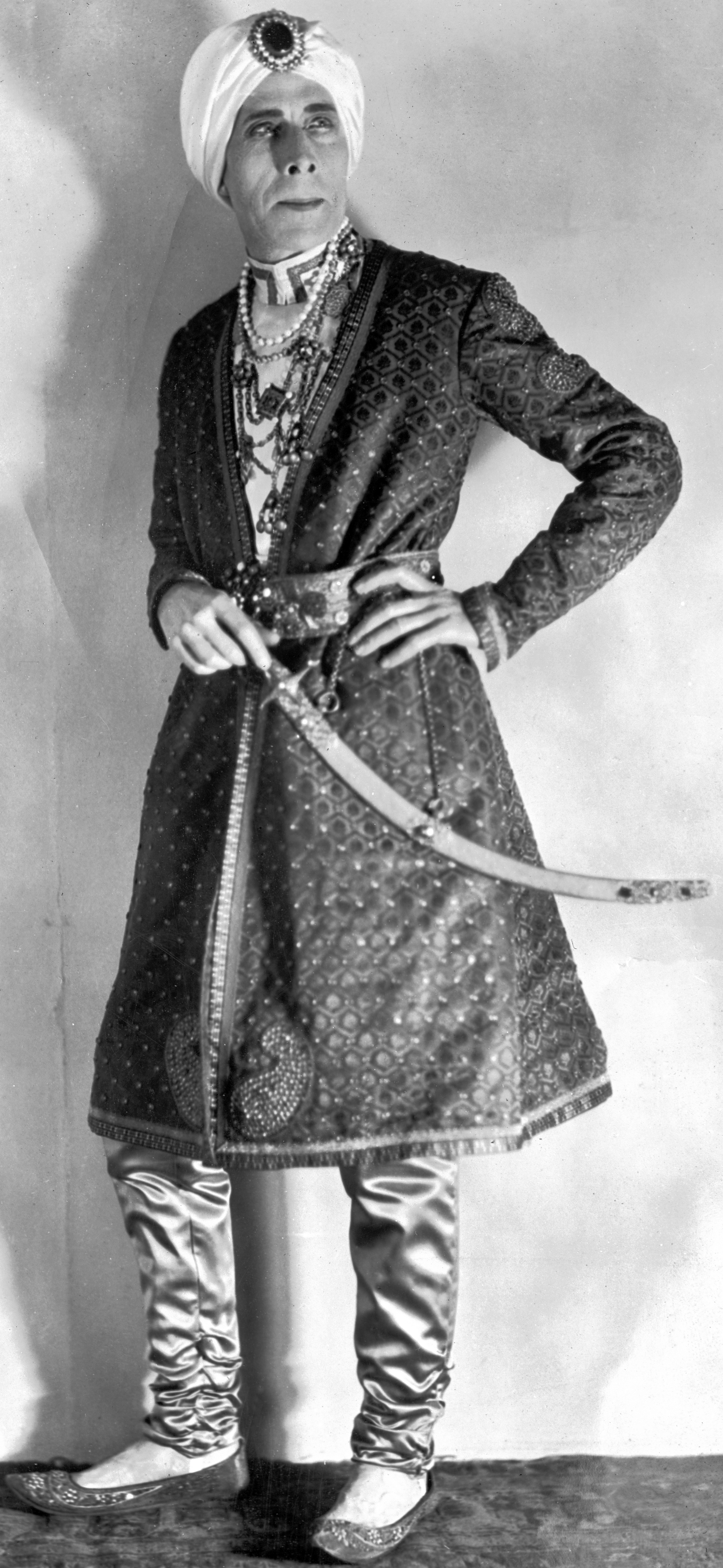
- George Arliss in The Green Goddess
- Original language: English
- Written by: William Archer
- Genre: Drama
- Setting: Remote area near the Himalayas

Premiere
- Date: January 18, 1921
- Place: Booth Theatre; New York City, New York

The Green Goddess was a popular stage play of 1921 by William Archer. In the three years after its publication, the play toured in both America and England. It was included in Burns Mantle's The Best Plays of 1920-1921.

The 1921 Broadway production four-act melodrama was produced and staged by Winthrop Ames. It ran for 175 performances from January 18, 1921, to June 1921 at the Booth Theatre.

== Broadway cast ==
- George Arliss as Raja of Rukh
- Ronald Colman as Temple Priest
- Ivan F. Simpson as Watkins
- Cyril Keightley as Dr. Basil Traherne
- David A. Leonard as High Priest
- Helen Nowell as An Ayah
- Herbert Ransome as Lt. Denis Cardew
- Herbert Waring as Major Antony Crespin
- Olive Wyndham as Lucilla

== Adaptations ==
The play was the basis for both a 1923 silent film and a 1930 talkie. Star George Arliss and Ivan F. Simpson reprised their roles in both films, as the Raja of Rukh and his chief aide, respectively. In 1939, Orson Welles staged a version in New York, which was preceded by a short film prelude – this was two years before the release of his debut feature film, Citizen Kane. The footage is now believed lost. In 1943 a third film adaptation Adventure in Iraq was produced, with the setting shifted from India to the Middle East.

In 1922, a novelization by Louise Jordan Miln was published.

== Things named after the play ==
Green Goddess salad dressing was invented in the 1920s, by the chef at the Palace Hotel in San Francisco, to commemorate the actor George Arliss and this play.

In 1925 a railway locomotive was named after it, the locomotive's owner having been inspired by the stage play.

The play is also an obscure reference ("what the Rajah of Rukh decided that Mrs Crespin would have been”) given by Bruce Truscot, the pseudonym of Edgar Allison Peers, and the author of Redbrick University, given in a letter to one of his critics, Professor Geoffrey Tillotson, in 1943.

== Bibliography ==
- Jeffrey Richards. Visions of Yesterday. Routledge, 2014.
