= The Green Goddess (1923 film) =

1923 film by Sidney Olcott

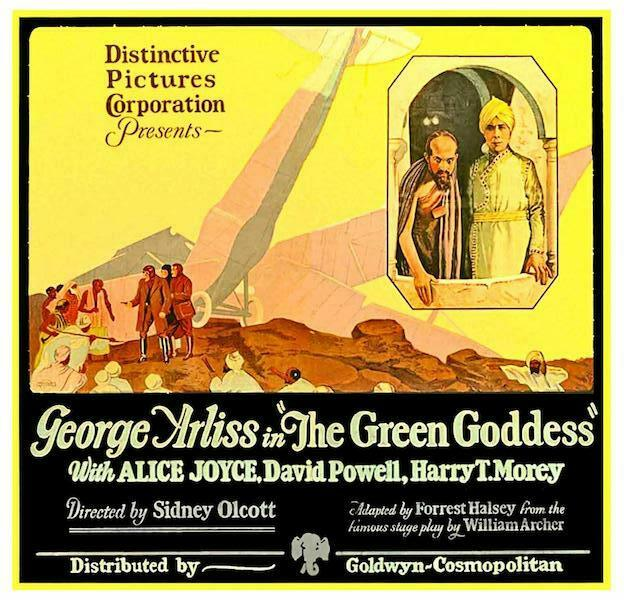
- Directed by: Sidney Olcott
- Written by: Forrest Halsey (adaptation)
- Based on: The Green Goddess by William Archer
- Produced by: Distinctive Productions
- Starring: George Arliss; Alice Joyce; David Powell; Harry T. Morey
- Cinematography: Harry Fischbeck
- Music by: Joseph Carl Breil
- Distributed by: Goldwyn Pictures
- Release date: August 14, 1923
- Running time: 80 minutes; 10 reels
- Country: United States
- Language: Silent (English intertitles)

The Green Goddess is a 1923 American silent adventure film based on the play The Green Goddess by William Archer. Set during the British Raj, it stars George Arliss as the Rajah of Rukh, into whose land arrive three British subjects, played by Alice Joyce, David Powell, and Harry T. Morey. Arliss, Joyce and Ivan F. Simpson reprised their roles from the play and also in the 1930 talking film version The Green Goddess.

== Cast ==
- George Arliss as Rajah of Rukh
- Alice Joyce as Lucilla Crespin
- David Powell as Dr. Traherne
- Harry T. Morey as Major Crespin
- Jetta Goudal as Ayah
- Ivan F. Simpson as Watkins (credited as Ivan Simpson)
- William Worthington as The High Priest

== Preservation ==
A copy of The Green Goddess is in the UCLA Film and Television Archive.
