= Widow at Windsor =

Widow at Windsor or Widow of Windsor may refer to:

- Queen Victoria, as a widow at the royal residence at Windsor
- The Widow at Windsor, a poem by Rudyard Kipling, referencing Queen Victoria
