= Green goddess =

Green goddess may refer to:

- Green Goddess fire engine
- Diana Moran, known as the Green goddess because of her green leotard
- Green goddess dressing, a type of salad dressing
- Liverpool Corporation Tramways, a name given to its "Car 869" tram
