= On the Road to Mandalay (song) =

Musical setting of the Rudyard Kipling poem "Mandalay", composed by Oley Speaks

- by Oley Speaks
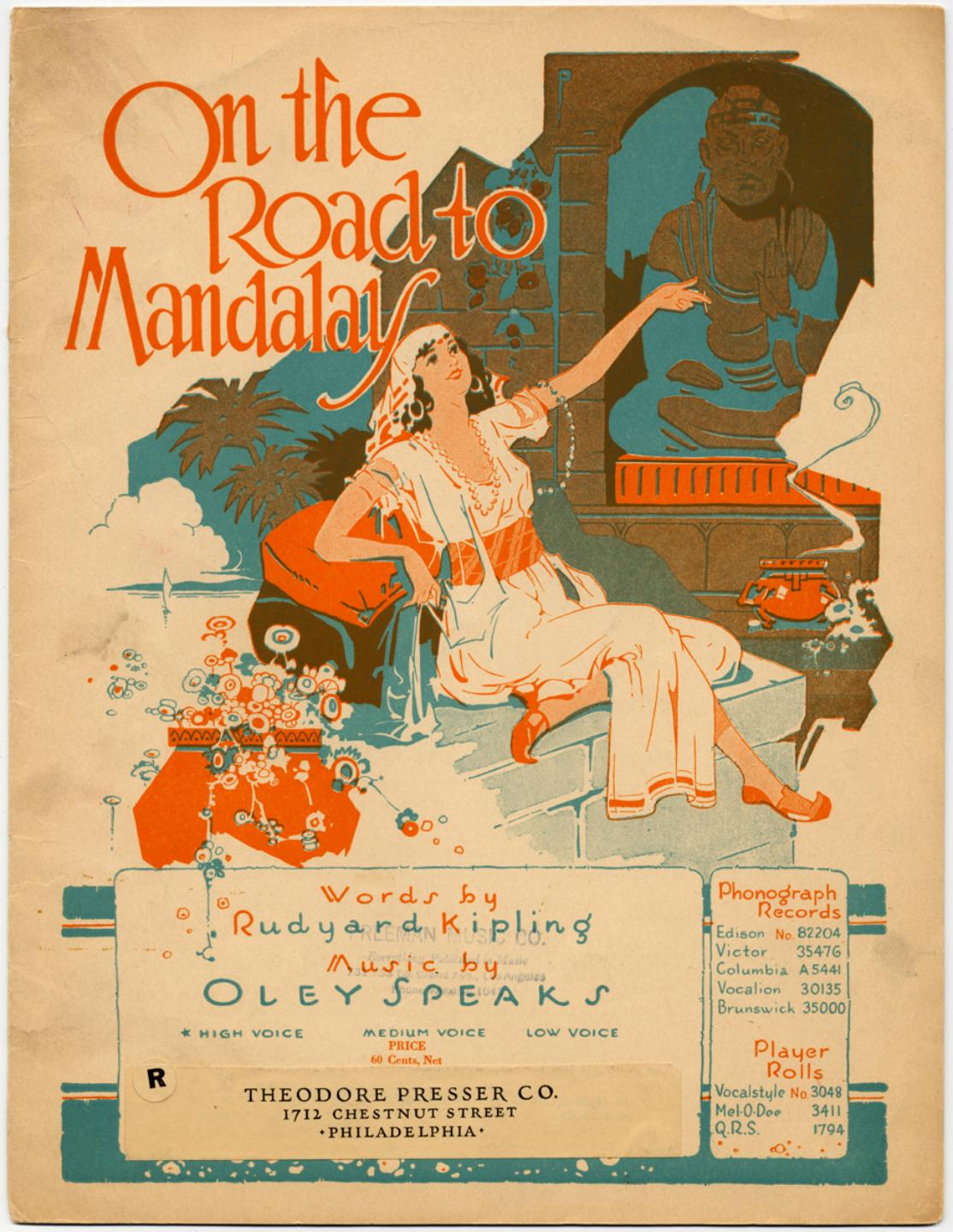
- Sheet music of "On the Road to Mandalay", 1907
- Key: B♭ major
- Genre: Contemporary music
- Style: Romantic
- Form: Piano/vocal song
- Text: Mandalay by Rudyard Kipling (1890)
- Time: Common time
- Dedication: Frank Croxton
- Published: 1907
- Publisher: John Church Company
- Recorded: by Frank Croxton (1913)
- Scoring: Voice and piano

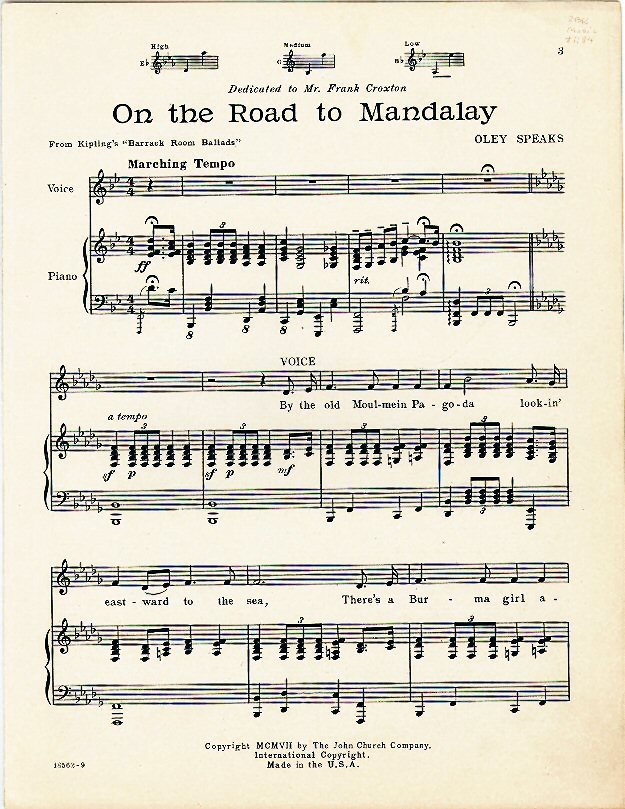
First sheet of Oley Speaks's setting of "On the Road to Mandalay", 1907

"On the Road to Mandalay" is a song by Oley Speaks (1874–1948) with text by Rudyard Kipling (1865–1936).

== Text ==
Oley Speaks set to music a portion of Kipling's poem Mandalay, 1890, from Barrack-Room Ballads, and Other Verses, published in 1892 and 1896. The song comprises three verses of Kipling's poem: the first, second and sixth. The text of the song is a first-person description by a British soldier in 19th-century Burma, who has returned to Britain. He describes his romance with a "Burma girl" and speaks of the emotional pull he experiences to return to Mandalay.

== Music ==
"On the Road to Mandalay" was published as a piano/vocal song in 1907 by the John Church Company and dedicated to Frank Croxton. The tempo is marked alla marcia and the music set in common time. The song changes tonality as each of the three verses reaches the chorus, shifting dramatically from minor to major. Originally published in the key of C and marked Low Voice, the style is described as Romantic. Composition features marked use of fermate and wide dynamic range, from pianissimo to fortissimo. Occasionally the second verse is cut, but the complete song averages four minutes in duration. Published originally for voice and piano, orchestral arrangements exist.

== Recording history ==
"On the Road to Mandalay" was well poised historically to become a frequently recorded song. In 1907, the sheet music was hugely popular and sold more than a million copies. An early recording was made by Frank Croxton, to whom the song was dedicated, in 1913. Famous baritone singers have recorded the song, from operatic artists, such as Lawrence Tibbett, Leonard Warren and Thomas Hampson, and concert artists, such as Peter Dawson, to more popular singers such as Nelson Eddy and Frankie Laine, and even Frank Sinatra, who sang a jazzy, controversial arrangement in which elements of the Kipling text were changed (notably Burma girl becoming Burma broad and Temple-bells becoming crazy bells), included in his album Come Fly with Me. Bing Crosby included the song in a medley on his album Join Bing and Sing Along (1960).

Rudyard Kipling's daughter, Elsie Bambridge, so disliked Sinatra's lyrical improvisations and jazzy arrangement of the song that she exercised her authority as executrix of Kipling's estate and because Kipling's poem was still copyrighted in the United Kingdom (copyright in the U. K. extended for 70 years after his death in 1936) to have the song banned for some years in the U.K.

When the album was released in the United Kingdom, "On the Road to Mandalay" was replaced by "It Happened in Monterey" on original mono releases and "French Foreign Legion" on stereo copies, while the song "Chicago" was used in other parts of the British Commonwealth. Sinatra sang the song in Australia during a concert tour in 1959 and relayed the story of the Kipling family objection to the song and explained how the Australian release of Come Fly with Me came to contain "Chicago". "Mandalay" was eventually restored on the 1984 UK re-pressing, and has been included on all subsequent releases.

Kipling’s daughter was not alone in being upset with Sinatra’s version. In a selection of comments on various topics, The New York Times said, "We applaud Mrs. Bambridge on her defense of good taste against the inroads of 'slanguage.' . . . It is a form of sacrilege to alter [great poetry] because it has been entrusted to us as part of our permanent heritage."

The song was performed by baritone Robert Merrill at the February 1968 US state dinner for British Prime Minister Harold Wilson, hosted by US President Johnson. The song (as well as I Got Plenty o' Nuttin', also performed by Merrill), were seen to be a message of Johnson's displeasure at Wilson's inaction on the Vietnam War. The previous month Wilson had announced that British troops would be withdrawn in 1971 from major military bases in South East Asia and elsewhere, an action described as Britain's East of Suez policy based on the lyrics in On the Road to Mandalay.
