= Soldier Soldier =

British television drama series (1991–1997)

- Genre: Military drama
- Created by: Lucy Gannon
- Starring: Robson Green; Jerome Flynn; Gary Love; Rosie Rowell; Holly Aird; Annabelle Apsion; Ben Nealon; Alex Leam
- Theme music composer: Jim Parker
- Opening theme: "Soldier Soldier"
- Country of origin: United Kingdom
- Original language: English
- No. of series: 7
- No. of episodes: 82

Production
- Executive producers: Ted Childs (Series 1–5); Jonathan Powell (Series 6–7)
- Running time: 50 minutes
- Production company: Central Independent Television

Original release
- Network: ITV
- Release: 10 June 1991 – 9 December 1997

Soldier Soldier is a British television drama series. Created by Lucy Gannon, produced by Central Television and broadcast on the ITV network, it ran for a total of seven series and 82 episodes from 10 June 1991 to 9 December 1997. It featured the daily lives of a group of soldiers in 'A' Company, 1st Battalion The King's Fusiliers, a fictional British Army infantry regiment loosely based on the Royal Regiment of Fusiliers. The title comes from a traditional song of the same name, "Soldier, Soldier, Won't You Marry Me?", an instrumental version of which is used as its theme music.

== Synopsis ==
Set in the immediate aftermath of the Cold War, it is a dramatisation of army life in the early to mid-1990s, when the British Army was undergoing significant change. This is perhaps best demonstrated during the third series, around 1994, when a significant number of real regiments were forced into amalgamations with one another due to downsizing of the army. Within the world of Soldier Soldier, the King's Fusiliers are forced to amalgamate with the Cumbrian Regiment, another fictional regiment, becoming the King's Own Fusiliers. At the time Soldier Soldier was broadcast, the fatality rate was low, with most casualties due to training accidents and suicides. The military as a whole was assigned to performing more peacekeeping missions than actually doing any fighting. As a consequence, the show served well to portray the army, despite the domestic problems that could occur, in a fairly good light.

== Production ==
Although many well known and not so well known actors appeared in Soldier Soldier over the period it was broadcast, perhaps the best known are Robson Green and Jerome Flynn, who portrayed Fusilier Dave Tucker and Sergeant Paddy Garvey respectively. It was their performance of "Unchained Melody" in an episode of the fourth series that propelled them to stardom, giving them several number one songs and a best selling album. At the end of the fifth series in 1995, both actors left the show. After a decline in viewing figures (following their departure), 1997 saw the decision to end the drama after seven series.

TV presenter Chris Kelly wrote and produced some episodes of the series.

== Regular cast ==
=== Officers ===
- Miles Anderson as Lieutenant Colonel Dan Fortune MC (Series 1–2)
- Patrick Drury as General Levy (Series 3)
- Robert Gwilym as Lieutenant Colonel Nick Hammond (Series 3)
- John Bowe as Lieutenant Colonel Ian Jennings (Series 4)
- Duncan Bell as Lieutenant Colonel Paul Philips (Series 5)
- Philip Bowen as Lieutenant Colonel Mike Eastwood (Series 6)
- James Cosmo as Lieutenant Colonel Philip Drysdale (Series 7)
- William Gaminara as Major Harry "Dickie" Bird (Series 1)
- David Haig as Major Tom Cadman (Series 1)
- Simon Donald as Major Bob Cochrane (Series 2)
- Adrian Rawlins as Major Tim Radley (Series 3)
- Dougray Scott as Major Rory Taylor (Series 5)
- James Callis as Major Tim Forrester (Series 6)
- Dorian Healy as Captain (later Major) Kieran Voce (Series 3–4)
- Peter Wingfield as Lieutenant Nick Pasco (Series 1)
- Angus Macfadyen as Second Lieutenant Alex Fereira (Series 2)
- Ben Nealon as Second Lieutenant (later Lieutenant, then Captain) Jeremy Forsythe (Series 4–7)

=== Warrant officers ===
- Sean Baker as Company Sergeant Major Chick Henwood (Series 1)
- Rob Spendlove as Company Sergeant Major (later Regimental Sergeant Major, then Lieutenant) Michael Stubbs (Series 3–5)
- Conor Mullen as Company Sergeant Major Alan Fitzpatrick (Series 7)

=== Non-commissioned officers (NCOs) ===
- Robert Glenister as Colour Sergeant (later Lieutenant) Ian Anderson (Series 1)
- Richard Dillane as Sergeant Brad Connor (Series 5)
- Jonathan Guy Lewis as Sergeant Chris McCleod (Series 6–7)
- Gary Love as Corporal (later Sergeant, and then Corporal again) Anthony "Tony" Wilton (Series 1–4)
- Razaaq Adoti as Corporal William Markham (Series 5)
- Ian Curtis as Corporal Mark Hobbs (Series 6–7)
- Jerome Flynn as Lance Corporal (later Corporal, and then Sergeant, and then Corporal again) Patrick "Paddy" Garvey (Series 1–5)
- Shaun Dingwall as Lance Corporal Steve Evans (Series 5–6)

=== Fusiliers ===
- Winston Crooke as Fusilier Joe Meakin (Series 1)
- Alex Leam as Simon Radcliffe (Series 1–5); also provided backing vocals to "Unchained Melody"
- Robson Green as Fusilier (later briefly Lance Corporal) David "Dave" Tucker (Series 1–5)
- Mo Sesay as Fusilier Michael "Midnight" Rawlings (Series 2–3)
- Akim Mogaji as Fusilier Luke Roberts (Series 3)
- Jack Deam as Fusilier Vinny Bowles (Series 3)
- David Groves as Fusilier Joe Farrell (Series 4–6)
- Paterson Joseph as Fusilier Eddie "Horatio" Nelson (Series 4)
- Danny Cunningham as Fusilier Andy Butcher (Series 5–7)
- Simon Sherlock as Fusilier Mel Briggs (Series 5–6)
- Thomas Craig as Fusilier Jacko Barton (Series 7)
- Chris Gascoyne as Fusilier Tony Rossi (Series 7)
- Simon Lyndon as Fusilier Michael Vickers (1 episode)

=== Attached arms ===
- Richard Hampton as Reverend (CF3) Simon Armstrong RAChD (Series 1–2)
- John McGlynn as Major James McCudden (Series 4)
- Lucy Cohu as Major Jessica Bailey AGC (Series 7)
- Sophie Dix as Captain Sadie Williams RAMC (Series 5)
- Lesley Vickerage as Second Lieutenant (later Lieutenant, and then Captain) Kate Butler (later Voce) AGC (Series 2–4)
- Biddy Hodson as Second Lieutenant Samantha Sheridan AGC (Series 6)
- Debra Beaumont as Sergeant Sally Hawkins (Series 4)
- Fiona Bell as Sergeant Angela McCleod AGC (Series 6–7)
- Holly Aird as Corporal (later Sergeant) Nancy Thorpe (later Garvey, then Thorpe, then Garvey) RMP (Series 1–3, 5)
- Ross O'Hennessy as Corporal Dando APTC (series 5 & 7)
- Kate O'Malley as Private Stacey Grey (later Butcher) RLC (Series 6–7)

=== Civilians ===
- Melanie Kilburn as Carol Anderson (Series 1)
- Samantha Morton as Clare Anderson (Series 1)
- Gareth Parrington as James Anderson (Series 1)
- Cathryn Harrison as Laura Cadman (Series 1)
- Susan Franklyn as Juliet Grant (Series 1)
- Rosie Rowell as Donna Tucker (Series 1–5)
- Annabelle Apsion as Joy Wilton (Series 1–5)
- Matthew Beard/David Gallivan/Sonny Dudley/Luke Burt as Matthew Wilton (Series 1–5)
- Lesley Manville as Rachel Fortune (née Elliot) (Series 2)
- Lena Headey as Shenna Bowles (Series 3)
- Marise Wipani as Ellie (Series 3)
- Suzanne Burden as Sandra Radley (Series 3)
- Rakie Ayola as Bernie Roberts (Series 3)
- William Ash as Jack Stubbs (Series 3–4)
- Denise Welch as Marsha Stubbs (Series 3–5)
- Tara Simpson as Sarah Stubbs (Series 3–4)
- Angela Clarke as Colette Daly (Series 4–5)
- Gabrielle Reidy as Isabelle Jennings (Series 4)
- Ellis Fernandez/Milo Taylor as Macaulay Tucker (Series 4–5)
- Nthati Moshesh as Lilian Malanje (later Forsythe) (Series 5–7)
- Alison Skilbeck as Dr Sarah Eastwood (Series 6)
- Kate Ashfield as Cate Hobbs (Series 6)
- Laura Howard as Deborah Osbourne (later Briggs) (Series 6)
- Kelly Hunter as Jackie Reece (Series 6)
- Joanna Phillips-Lane as Karen Fitzpatrick (Series 7)
- Lee Ingleby as Kevin Fitzpatrick (Series 7)
- Sarah Smart as Lucy Fitzpatrick (Series 7)
- Michelle Butterly as Julie Oldroyd (Series 7)

== Series overview ==
Series	Episodes	Originally released	
Series	Episodes	First released	Last released
1	7	10 June 1991	22 July 1991
2	7	21 September 1992	2 November 1992
3	13	7 September 1993	30 November 1993
4	13	20 September 1994	13 December 1994
5	15	5 September 1995	12 December 1995
6	15	3 September 1996	10 December 1996
7	12	23 September 1997	9 December 1997

== Episodes ==
=== Series 1 (1991) ===
Following a six-month tour in Northern Ireland, the King's Fusiliers return to duty at their Midlands headquarters.

No.	Episode	Directed by	Written by	Original release date
1	"All the King's Men"	Laurence Moody	Lucy Gannon	10 June 1991
2	"Fun and Games"	Laurence Moody	Lucy Gannon	17 June 1991
3	"Dirty Work"	Zelda Barron	Lucy Gannon	24 June 1991
4	"Fighting Spirit"	Laurence Moody	Garry Lyons	1 July 1991
5	"Battlefields"	Laurence Moody	Lucy Gannon	8 July 1991
6	"Loyal to the Corps"	Laurence Moody	Jane Hollowood	15 July 1991
7	"Flying Colours"	Laurence Moody	Lucy Gannon	22 July 1991

=== Series 2 (1992) ===
Series 2 was set in Hong Kong, apart from the first two episodes.

No.	Episode	Directed by	Written by	Original release date
1	"A Man's Life"	Laurence Moody	Lucy Gannon	21 September 1992
2	"Something Old, Something New"	Laurence Moody	Lucy Gannon	28 September 1992
3	"A Touch of the Sun"	Laurence Moody	Jane Hollowood	5 October 1992
4	"Lifelines"	Nick Hamm	Lucy Gannon	12 October 1992
5	"Saving Face"	Nick Hamm	Jack Chaney	19 October 1992
6	"Lost and Found"	Laurence Moody	Billy Hamon	26 October 1992
7	"The Last Post"	Nick Hamm	Lucy Gannon	2 November 1992

=== Series 3 (1993) ===
Series 3 was set in New Zealand and Germany.

No.	Episode	Directed by	Written by	Original release date
1	"Shifting Sands"	Anthony Garner	Heidi Thomas, from an idea by Chris Kelly	7 September 1993
2	"Live Fire"	Ian Mune	Heidi Thomas	14 September 1993
3	"Base Details"	Anthony Garner	Victoria Taylor	21 September 1993
4	"Fall Out"	Sarah Hellings	Julian Jones	28 September 1993
5	"Disintegration"	Suri Krishnamma	Peter Barwood	5 October 1993
6	"Hide and Seek"	Rodney Bennett	Bill Gallagher	12 October 1993
7	"Trouble and Strife"	Anthony Garner	Peter Barwood	19 October 1993
8	"Hard Knocks"	Jan Sargent	Billy Hamon	26 October 1993
9	"Camouflage"	Anthony Garner	Roy MacGregor	2 November 1993
10	"Staying Together"	Rodney Bennett	Sam Snape	9 November 1993
11	"Dutch Courage"	Michael Brayshaw	Jesse Carr Martindale	16 November 1993
12	"Stand by Me"	Michael Brayshaw	Heidi Thomas	23 November 1993
13	"Leaving"	Anthony Garner	Roy MacGregor	30 November 1993

=== Series 4 (1994) ===
Series 4 was set in Cyprus, Germany and the UK.

No.	Episode	Directed by	Written by	Original release date
1	"Stormy Weather"	Rodney Bennett	Heidi Thomas	20 September 1994
2	"Away Games"	Rodney Bennett	Michael Jenner	27 September 1994
3	"Damage"	Michael Brayshaw	Heidi Thomas	4 October 1994
4	"Second Sight"	Anthony Garner	Peter Barwood	11 October 1994
5	"Over the Top"	Anthony Garner	Len Collin	18 October 1994
6	"Proud Man"	Anthony Garner	Len Collin	25 October 1994
7	"Further Education"	Michael Brayshaw	Peter Barwood	1 November 1994
8	"Baby Love"	Anthony Garner	Michael Jenner	8 November 1994
9	"Band of Gold"	Graham Moore	Heidi Thomas	15 November 1994
10	"Going Back"	Anthony Garner	Peter Barwood	22 November 1994
11	"Poles Apart"	Michael Brayshaw	Michael Jenner	29 November 1994
12	"Bombshell"	Michael Brayshaw	Chris Ould	6 December 1994
13	"Changing the Guard"	Graham Moore	Peter Barwood	13 December 1994

=== Series 5 (1995) ===
Series 5 was set in Australia, the UK and South Africa.

No.	Episode	Directed by	Written by	Original release date
1	"For Better, For Worse"	Bruce MacDonald	Peter Barwood	5 September 1995
2	"Second Chances"	Bruce MacDonald	Peter Barwood	12 September 1995
3	"Love Not Money"	Paul Brown	Jo O'Keefe	19 September 1995
4	"Bushed"	Ken Hannam	Peter Barwood	26 September 1995
5	"Far Away"	Ken Hannam	Ann Brown	3 October 1995
6	"Ill Wind"	Ken Hannam	Ann Brown	10 October 1995
7	"Sweet Revenge"	Geoff Harris	Jo O'Keefe	17 October 1995
8	"The Army Game"	Graham Moore	Shaun Prendergast	24 October 1995
9	"Love and War"	Michael Brayshaw	Chris Lang	31 October 1995
10	"Leaving"	Michael Brayshaw	Chris Lang	7 November 1995
11	"Hard Lessons"	Graham Moore	James Clare	14 November 1995
12	"Stick Together"	Bruce MacDonald	Jo O'Keefe	21 November 1995
13	"Under the Sun"	Alan Grint	Peter Barwood	28 November 1995
14	"Baptism of Fire"	Alan Grint	Peter Barwood	5 December 1995
15	"Twist of Fate"	Alan Grint	Peter Barwood	12 December 1995

=== Series 6 (1996) ===
Series 6 was set in the UK, except the penultimate episode, which was set on a fictional island in the South Atlantic.

No.	Episode	Directed by	Written by	Original release date
1	"River Deep"	Patrick Lau	Chris Lang	3 September 1996
2	"Divided Loyalties"	Paul Brown	Ann Brown	10 September 1996
3	"All for One"	Michael Brayshaw	Simon Andrew Stirling	17 September 1996
4	"Walking on Air"	Catherine Morshead	Peter Barwood	24 September 1996
5	"Under the Gooseberry Bush"	Michael Brayshaw	Len Collin	1 October 1996
6	"Flash Point"	Paul Brown	Peter Barwood	8 October 1996
7	"Money For Nothing"	Graham Moore	Chris Lang	15 October 1996
8	"Dear Joe"	Douglas Mackinnon	James Quirk	22 October 1996
9	"Asking for it?"	Michael Brayshaw	Len Collin	29 October 1996
10	"Delayed Action"	Graham Moore	Ted Childs	5 November 1996
11	"Beast"	Paul Brown	Peter Barwood	12 November 1996
12	"Fall for Love"	Douglas Mackinnon	James Quirk	19 November 1996
13	"War Path"	Michael Brayshaw	Mark Holloway	26 November 1996
14	"Deliver us from Evil"	Douglas Mackinnon	Chris Lang	3 December 1996
15	"Hell and High Water"	Paul Brown	Len Collin	10 December 1996

=== Series 7 (1997) ===
The final series was set in the UK, except episode 10, which was set in Africa.

No.	Episode	Directed by	Written by	Original release date
1	"Divided We Fall"	Paul Brown	James Quirk	23 September 1997
2	"Things Can Only Get Better!"	Graham Moore	Nicholas Martin	30 September 1997
3	"Line of Departure"	Paul Brown	Bernadette Davis	7 October 1997
4	"Under Fire"	Christopher King	Nicholas Martin	14 October 1997
5	"Friends and Lovers"	Christopher King	Richard McBrien	21 October 1997
6	"How Was it for You?"	Graham Moore	Nicholas Martin	28 October 1997
7	"The Road to Damascus"	Christopher King	Len Collin	4 November 1997
8	"Out"	Crispin Reece	Mark Holloway	11 November 1997
9	"Fit to Explode"	Graham Moore	Shaun Prendergast	18 November 1997
10	"Chain of Command"	Roger Tucker	Rob Gittins	25 November 1997
11	"Sounds of War"	Graham Moore	Billy Hamon	2 December 1997
12	"No Pain, No Gain!"	Paul Brown	Nicholas Martin	9 December 1997

== Regiment ==
The King's Own Fusiliers
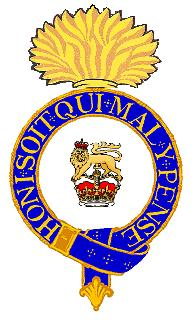
- Cap badge of the King's Own Fusiliers
- Active: 1993–
- Country: United Kingdom
- Branch: Army
- Type: Line Infantry
- Role: Air Assault Infantry (at end of series)
- Size: One battalion
- Part of: King's Division
- Garrison/HQ: 1st Battalion – Aldershot (at end of series)
- Motto: Honi Soit Qui Mal Y Pense (Shamed Be He Who Thinks Ill Of It)

Insignia
- Hackle: Blue over White; From King's Fusiliers

The King's Own Fusiliers, originally the King's Fusiliers, is the infantry regiment portrayed in the series. Like all fusilier regiments, both the "King's" and the "King's Own" wear a hackle in its head-dress; this is coloured dark blue over white. During the third series of Soldier Soldier, which took place during the Options for Change military reforms, the King's Fusiliers was forced to amalgamate with another regiment, "The Cumbrians (Duke of Rutland's Own)", mimicking the real life amalgamation of the King's Own Royal Regiment (Lancaster) and the Cumbrian based Border Regiment in 1959 to form the King's Own Royal Border Regiment.

During negotiations with the commanding officer of the other regiment to be merged (over which customs and traditions should be carried over to the new regiment), attempts were made by the Cumbrians to keep the new regiment as an ordinary infantry regiment, rather than a fusilier regiment, which would also see the loss of the King's hackle. However, research by the regimental commander of the King's Fusiliers, Lt Col Osbourne, found that, during the Cumbrians' (fictional) service in the Crimea, the Cumbrians had worn the hackle and served as fusiliers for six months in honour of the fusiliers that had served alongside them. As a result, the new regiment was named "The King's Own Fusiliers".

The cap badge of the King's Own Fusiliers features the lion surmounting the crown, which is the recognised symbol of the British Army, within the circlet of the Order of the Garter. Surmounting the garter is the traditional flame that indicates a fusilier regiment. (Coincidentally, in series 1 episode 2 of Red Cap, the Royal Cambrian Fusiliers wore the same cap badge and hackle as the King's Own Fusiliers.)

=== Role ===
As an ordinary infantry battalion, the King's Fusiliers/King's Own Fusiliers was in the arms plot rotation, and thus participated in a number of different roles:

- 1st Battalion, King's Fusiliers
  - Light infantry battalion in the UK
  - Resident infantry battalion in Hong Kong (with training deployment to New Zealand)
- 1st Battalion, King's Own Fusiliers
  - Armoured infantry battalion with 4th (Armoured) Brigade in Germany
  - United Nations peacekeepers with UNPROFOR in Bosnia
  - Public duties battalion in Windsor
  - Infantry training battalion Warminster
  - Air assault infantry battalion with 5th (Airborne) Brigade

During its time in Windsor, in addition to other duties, the King's Own Fusiliers provided the guard at Buckingham Palace, the Tower of London and Windsor Castle.

==== Recruiting area ====
As the King's Fusiliers/King's Own Fusiliers has no geographical location in its name, it can only be speculated what recruiting area it represents. In early episodes, the senior officers discuss the possibility of being amalgamated with other regiments from the Midlands. During series 1, the possibility of merging or disbanding regiments is discussed, and, at that point, the Cumbrians and the Rutlands are expected to be amalgamated. During the final episode of series 2, the regiment's commanding officer announces orders for the King's Fusiliers to form a new "Midlands Regiment" along with the Cumbrians and the Rutlands, though, in later episodes, the other regiment to be merged is referred to as The Cumbrians (Duke of Rutland's Own).

Other anecdotal references in the series pointing to the regiment's location being in the Midlands include the use of a Midlands commercial radio station, BRMB, being played by various characters, and a local, specifically Birmingham, telephone area code on signage and vehicles. However, given that the series was made in the Midlands by the "Central Films" division of Central Television, these local references can be expected.

=== Commanding officers ===
- 1st Battalion, King's Fusiliers
  - Lt Col D Fortune MC (1991–1992) (Miles Anderson, series 1 and 2). A mild mannered man who is nonetheless a firm disciplinarian. Fortune is a widower, having lost, off-screen, his first wife to cancer. Between series 1 and 2, he meets and then, in series 2, marries a journalist, Rachel Elliot. After receiving orders for the regiment to be amalgamated, he decides to retire from the army.
  - Lt Col M Osbourne (1992–1993) (Patrick Drury, series 3). Succeeding Lt Col Fortune, his command of the regiment mainly occurs during the time between series; he appears in three episodes of series 3. After helping to negotiate the regimental merger, he resigns his commission to spend more time with his daughter.
- 1st Battalion, King's Own Fusiliers
  - Lt Col N Hammond (1993–1994) (Robert Gwilym, series 3). A keen and ambitious officer, who takes command of the new King's Own Fusiliers during their posting in Germany. A no-nonsense man who makes his mark by having LCpl Tucker demoted for bringing the regiment into disrepute. After taking the regiment to Bosnia on NATO peacekeeping duties, he hands over control to Lt Col Jennings.
  - Lt Col I Jennings (1994–1995) (John Bowe, series 4). Jennings assumes command from Hammond upon the regiment's return from Bosnia. His first task is presenting the UN medals; the major assignment that follows is the regiment's relocation from Munster to Windsor. The regiment is later assigned to public duties, guarding locations such as Buckingham Palace and the Tower of London.
  - Lt Col P Philips (1995–1996) (Duncan Bell, series 5). The regiment's youngest commanding officer, Philips is an approachable man, but a stickler for regulations, adhering rigidly to the army's anti-gay stance on discovering that two of his men are in a relationship. Despite this, he bends the rules himself by starting a relationship with Capt Sadie Williams, the medical officer.
  - Lt Col M Eastwood (1996–1997) (Philip Bowen, series 6). An older man who is married with stepchildren, Eastwood has an avuncular nature and takes on something of a fatherly role to the men. He leads the regiment into combat when the British protectorate Deliverance Island is invaded, but loses a leg to a land mine during the operation, and retires soon afterwards.
  - Lt Col P Drysdale (1997) (James Cosmo, series 7). A combat veteran, Drysdale alienates most of the other officers and some of the men with his brusque style, especially when he withholds information during an exercise that leads to a civilian volunteer being injured. After a disastrous peacekeeping operation in Zokindi, where his decisions result in a group being captured and three men killed, he is court martialled for failing to follow the chain of command, and resigns.

== Fictional regiments featured in Soldier Soldier ==
- The King's Fusiliers (later the King's Own Fusiliers)
- The Cumbrians (Duke of Rutland's Own) – amalgamates with the King's Fusiliers
- The Malvern Regiment – exercises with the King's Fusiliers during their time in Germany

== See also ==
- Red Cap
- Spearhead
- Ultimate Force – Focuses on the British Army's Special Air Service.
