= Soldier, Soldier (poem) =

Poem by Rudyard Kipling

"Soldier, Soldier" is a poem by Rudyard Kipling from Barrack-Room Ballads. The lyrics of the poem are not directly related to the traditional ballad "Soldier, soldier won't you marry me" and instead begin "Soldier, soldier come from the wars, Why don't you march with my true love?"
