= The Green Goddess (1930 film) =

1930 film

- Poster
- Directed by: Alfred E. Green
- Written by: Julien Josephson
- Based on: The Green Goddess; 1921 play by William Archer
- Produced by: Walter Morosco
- Starring: George Arliss; Ralph Forbes; H.B. Warner; Alice Joyce
- Cinematography: James Van Trees
- Edited by: James Gibbon
- Music by: Louis Silvers
- Production company: Warner Bros. Pictures
- Distributed by: Warner Bros. Pictures
- Release date: February 13, 1930
- Running time: 73 minutes
- Country: United States
- Language: English

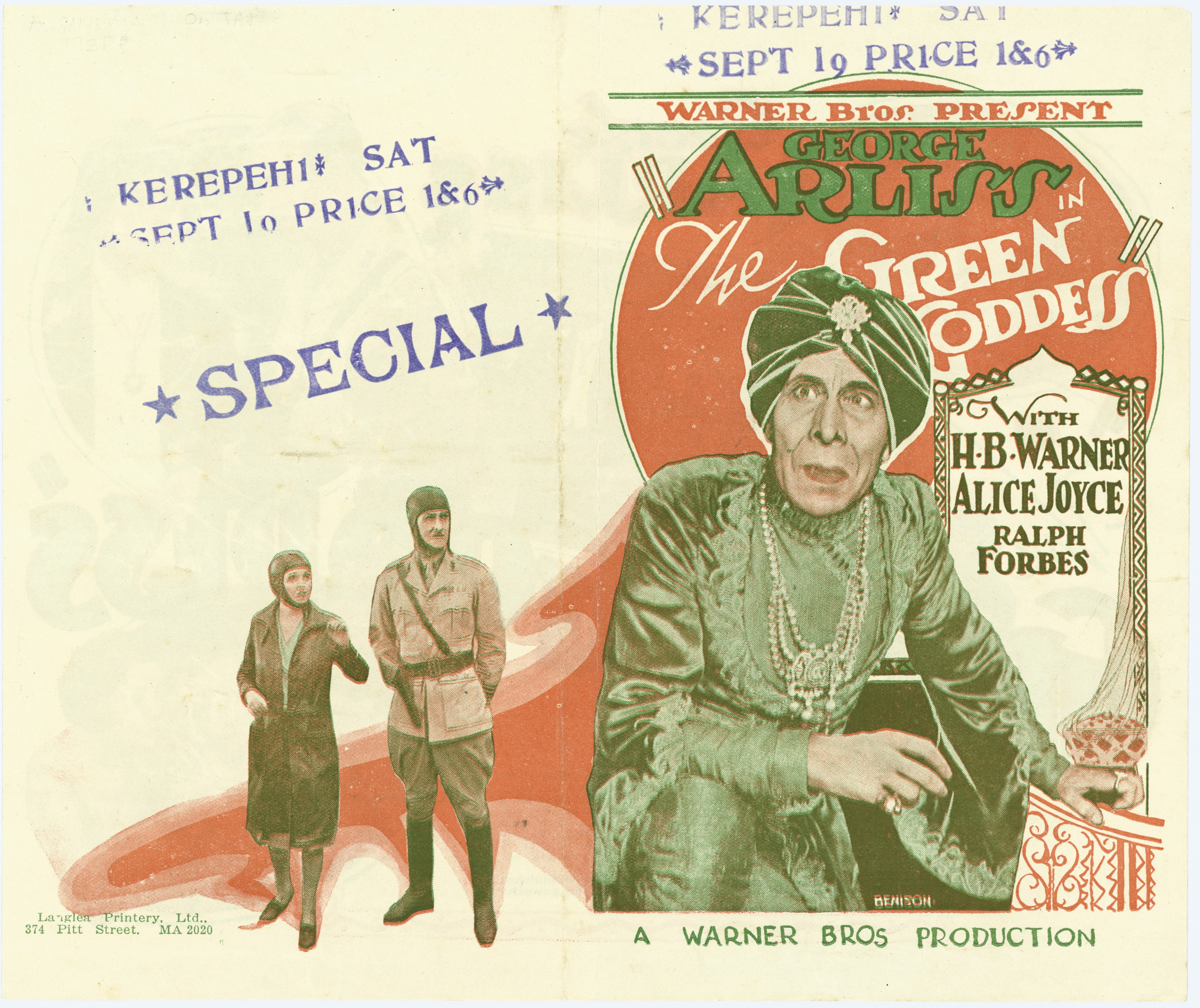
Pamphlet for promoting the film

The Green Goddess is a 1930 American pre-Code adventure film directed by Alfred E. Green. It was a remake of the 1923 silent film, which was in turn based on the play of the same name by William Archer. It was produced by Warner Bros. Pictures using their new Vitaphone sound system, and adapted by Julien Josephson. The film was copyrighted on September 7, 1929 (Registration No: LP 667) and is therefore in the public domain.

It stars George Arliss, Alice Joyce (in her final film role), Ralph Forbes and H.B. Warner. Arliss and Ivan F. Simpson played the same parts in all three productions, while Joyce reprised her role from the earlier film. Arliss was nominated for an Academy Award for Best Actor in a Leading Role for his performance.

== Plot ==
A small plane carrying three British citizens — Major Crespin, his estranged wife Lucilla, and pilot Dr. Traherne — becomes lost and is forced to crash land in the tiny realm of Rukh, somewhere near the Himalaya Mountains. The Raja who rules the land welcomes them.

As it happens, the Raja's three brothers are soon to be executed for murder by the British. When the three plane-crash survivors appear, the Raja's subjects become convinced that their Green Goddess has delivered three victims into their hands for revenge. The three are to be killed once the Raja's three brothers are dead. The Raja professes no great love for his brothers, as they had posed a danger to the succession of his own children, but he sees no reason to anger his people by protecting his British guests. When he becomes attracted to Lucilla, however, he offers to spare her life if she will become his wife. She refuses.

The prisoners become aware that the Raja has a telegraph, operated by the Raja's renegade British exile and chief assistant, Watkins. Hoping to send for help, they try to bribe Watkins, but when they realize he is only leading them on, they throw him off the balcony to his death. Major Crespin manages to send a message before the Raja's men break into the room. The Raja personally shoots Crespin in the back, killing him in mid-transmission.

The next day, Traherne and Lucilla are taken to the temple of the Green Goddess. Once more, the Raja renews his offer to Lucilla, but is again turned down. Given a moment alone, Traherne and Lucilla confess their love for each other. Then, in the nick of time, six British biplanes appear in the skies over Rukh. Lt. Cardew lands and demands the release of the couple. The Raja gives in.

== Cast ==
- George Arliss as The Raja
- Ralph Forbes as Dr. Traherne
- H. B. Warner as Major Crespin
- Alice Joyce as Lucilla
- Ivan F. Simpson as Watkins
- Reginald Sheffield as Lieutenant Cardew
- Betty Boyd as An Ayah
- Nigel De Brulier as Temple Priest

== Production ==
The Green Goddess was filmed and copyrighted in 1929 and completed before Disraeli (1929) but was held out of release until later at the request of George Arliss because he felt that Disraeli was a better vehicle for his sound debut.

The Green Goddess first was adapted for cinema in 1923. Produced by Distinctive Productions, it was directed by Sidney Olcott and played by George Arliss, Alice Joyce and Jetta Goudal.

== Adaptations to radio ==
The Green Goddess was adapted as a one-hour radio play on the January 6, 1935 broadcast of Lux Radio Theater, starring Claude Rains.

It was adapted to radio again by Orson Welles on The Campbell Playhouse on February 10, 1939, with Welles as The Rajah and Madeleine Carroll as Lucille.

== Preservation status ==
The film survives with copies at the Library of Congress and Wisconsin Center for Film and Theater Research.
