= Tommy (Kipling poem) =

1890 poem by Rudyard Kipling

"Tommy" is an 1890 poem by Rudyard Kipling, reprinted in his 1892 Barrack-Room Ballads. The poem addresses the ordinary British soldier of Kipling's time in a sympathetic manner. It is written from the point of view of such a soldier, and contrasts the treatment they receive from the general public during peace and during war.

== Background ==
The Tommy of the poem is Tommy Atkins, a generic slang name for a common British soldier. A term of uncertain origin, (Note: In the second volume of her biography of the 1st Duke of Wellington (Wellington: Pillar of State), Elizabeth Longford suggests that the Duke was sent a draft paybook to approve and crossed out the original placeholder name, replacing it with Thomas Atkins, the name of a private in the 33rd Foot. She gives some details of the man's service and asserts that the original paybook was still in existence when she wrote the biography in the 1970s.) the name "Thomas Atkins" was used in nineteenth century War Office manuals as a placeholder name to demonstrate how forms should be filled out. In popular use, "Thomas" became the more familiar "Tommy".

== The poem ==
The poem comprises five verses of eight lines each and is written in a colloquial style of English. The second half of each verse begins with a variation of the refrain "it's Tommy this, an' Tommy that".

The narrator is a British soldier who describes the poor treatment he receives in Britain (for example, he laments being refused service by a pub owner for being a "redcoat"). He sees that the soldiers are praised only when sent to war or on the front line.

I went into a public 'ouse to get a pint o' beer,
The publican 'e up an' sez, "We serve no red-coats here."
The girls be'ind the bar they laughed an' giggled fit to die,
I outs into the street again an' to myself sez I:
O it's Tommy this, an' Tommy that, an' "Tommy, go away";
But it's "Thank you, Mister Atkins," when the band begins to play
The band begins to play, my boys, the band begins to play,
O it's "Thank you, Mister Atkins," when the band begins to play.

I went into a theatre as sober as could be,
They gave a drunk civilian room, but 'adn't none for me;
They sent me to the gallery or round the music-'alls,
But when it comes to fightin', Lord! they'll shove me in the stalls!
For it's Tommy this, an' Tommy that, an' "Tommy, wait outside";
But it's "Special train for Atkins" when the trooper's on the tide
The troopship's on the tide, my boys, the troopship's on the tide,
O it's "Special train for Atkins" when the trooper's on the tide.

Yes, makin' mock o' uniforms that guard you while you sleep
Is cheaper than them uniforms, an' they're starvation cheap.
An' hustlin' drunken soldiers when they're goin' large a bit
Is five times better business than paradin' in full kit.
Then it's Tommy this, an' Tommy that, an' Tommy, 'ow's yer soul?"
But it's "Thin red line of 'eroes" when the drums begin to roll
The drums begin to roll, my boys, the drums begin to roll,
O it's "Thin red line of 'eroes," when the drums begin to roll.

We aren't no thin red 'eroes, nor we aren't no blackguards too,
But single men in barricks, most remarkable like you;
An' if sometimes our conduck isn't all your fancy paints,
Why, single men in barricks don't grow into plaster saints;
While it's Tommy this, an' Tommy that, an' Tommy, fall be'ind,"
But it's "Please to walk in front, sir," when there's trouble in the wind
There's trouble in the wind, my boys, there's trouble in the wind,
O it's "Please to walk in front, sir," when there's trouble in the wind.

You talk o' better food for us, an' schools, an' fires, an' all:
We'll wait for extry rations if you treat us rational.
Don't mess about the cook-room slops, but prove it to our face
The Widow's Uniform is not the soldier-man's disgrace.
For it's Tommy this, an' Tommy that, an' Chuck him out, the brute!"
But it's "Saviour of 'is country" when the guns begin to shoot;
An' it's Tommy this, an' Tommy that, an' anything you please;
An' Tommy ain't a bloomin' fool - you bet that Tommy sees!

— Tommy

Tommy rejects both sides of this duality, saying that he and his fellow soldiers are neither "thin red 'eroes" nor "blackguards", but just ordinary men. The soldier calls for those who talk of improving things for soldiers to take action, and the poem ends by claiming that "Tommy" is well aware of the way he is treated.

T. S. Eliot included the poem in his 1941 collection A Choice of Kipling's Verse.

The Dudley Do-Right episode "Mechanical Dudley" incorporates lines 33-34 into the speiel which its creator, villain Snidely Whiplash, programmes into the automaton version of the hero.
