= Oley Speaks =

American composer and songwriter

- Born: June 28, 1874; Canal Winchester, Ohio, United States
- Died: August 7, 1948 (aged 74) New York City, United States
- Genres: Art song, choral music
- Occupations: Singer, composer
- Instrument: Voice
- Years active: 1898–1944

Oley Speaks (June 28, 1874 – August 7, 1948) was an American composer and songwriter. His compositions include many religious songs, as well as his best-known success, "On the Road to Mandalay", which takes its lyrics from the poem "Mandalay" by Rudyard Kipling. The Canal Winchester Area Historical Society Museum has exhibits about the life of Oley Speaks, including original sheet music written by him.

== Biography ==
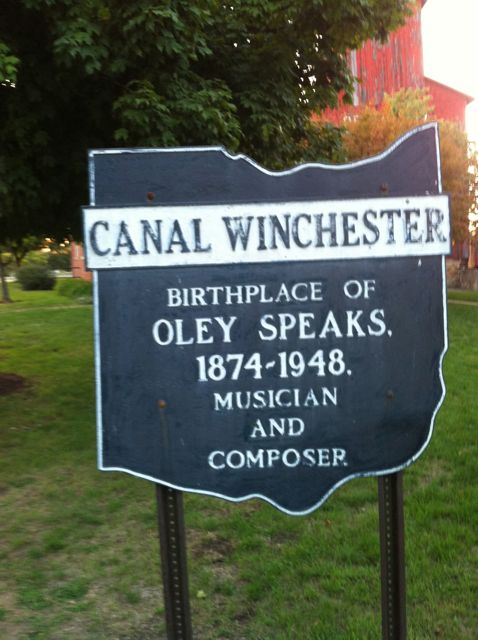
Town sign in Canal Winchester, Ohio, honoring Oley Speaks

Speaks was born in Canal Winchester, Ohio, the son of a grain merchant and contractor. He was ten when his father Charles W. died, and his mother Sarah and family moved to Columbus soon afterwards. He learned the piano as a boy, and was praised for his baritone voice as early as 1891 by The Columbus Dispatch. In the 1890s he began his career as a railroad clerk at a station in Columbus, Ohio, until he decided to pursue his musical passions. He was developing a reputation as a fine baritone singer in churches in Columbus before he moved to New York City in 1898 and started taking lessons. One of his voice teachers was the American soprano Emma Thursby. Speaks had a successful career as a singer, touring the United States giving recitals and also appearing in oratorios.

Speaks began to write songs, many with religious themes. He studied composition with Will Macfarlane and Max Spicker. In 1907, he wrote "On the Road to Mandalay" using the words of Rudyard Kipling's poem "Mandalay", which sold over one million copies. The song was a popular parlour ballad, particularly in the United Kingdom and British territories worldwide, and was boosted by the recording by Frank Sinatra which was released on the Come Fly with Me album in 1958. However, after some resistance from the Kipling estate over the omission of several verses, this version of the song remained embargoed in the British Commonwealth until it appeared on the digitally-remastered release of the album many years later. Speaks had two further million-selling successes, "Morning" to a lyric by Frank Lebby Stanton in 1910 and "Sylvia" to a lyric by Clinton Scollard in 1914. The American baritone Robert Merrill, the Austrian tenor Richard Tauber, the Swedish tenor Jussi Bjorling and the American singer Nelson Eddy were among the singers who recorded "Sylvia". The Irish tenor John McCormack's recordings of all three famous titles are available on CD. More recently, American baritone Thomas Hampson has also recorded "On the Road to Mandalay".

Speaks was a prominent member of ASCAP, where he was elected director in 1924 and served until 1943. He was also a National Patron of Delta Omicron, an international professional music fraternity.

== In the movies ==
Speaks can be described as a "one-hit wonder", but his most famous work was included in the soundtrack of several films:

- Paul Tremaine and His Aristocrats (1929) (sung by Paul Tremaine)
- Metro Movietone Revue (1929/II) (sung by George Dewey Washington)
- Mandalay (1934) (played during opening credits) (not to be confused with The Road to Mandalay, a 1926 film)
- China Seas (1935) (variation played as part of the score during the opening credits and at the end)
- Metropolitan (1935) (sung by Lawrence Tibbett with piano accompaniment by Luis Alberni (who both appeared) in the score during the end credits)
- They Met in Bombay (1941) (played several times as part of the score)

S.O.B. (1981) Robert Preston sings a few seconds of Mandalay: "And the dawn comes up like thunder..." at 1:46

== Musical works ==
Over 250 songs, originally published by G. Schirmer or The John Church Company, including:

- Again the Strains of "Holy Night" (Christmas Carol) (Schirmer)
- A Night in June (John Church)
- April Rain (Robert Loveman, in Harper's Magazine) (John Church, 1901)
- Ashes of Roses (John Church)
- A Song of April (John Church)
- At Starlight-time (Schirmer)
- Back again in Eldon (Schirmer)
- The Bells of Youth (Schirmer)
- Beloved, It is Morn (Emily Hickey) (John Church, 1906)
- Bend low, O dusky night (Schirmer)
- By the Waters of Babylon (Psalm cxxxvii, 1-5) (Schirmer and John Church)
- Call of the Lark (Schirmer)
- Charity (Schirmer, 1911)
- Come, Spirit of the Living God (Schirmer)
- Day is Dawning (Schirmer)
- Day is Dying in the West (Schirmer)
- The Elder Blossoms (John Church)
- Elysium (Clinton Scollard) (Schirmer, 1913)
- Eternity (Schirmer)
- The Evening Hour (Schirmer)
- An Evening Song (Schirmer)
- Everywhere (S. B. Cassin) (John Church, 1907)
- Eyes of Blue (John Church)
- For a Day (Schirmer)
- For Love and Thee (Lucien G. Chaffin) (Schirmer)
- For You, Dear Heart (John Church, 1903)
- A Garden Idyl (Arthur Wallace Peach) (Schirmer)
- Gently, Lord, Oh, Gently Lead Us (Thomas Hastings) (Schirmer, 1914)
- Go 'long, chile, to Sleepy-Town (Schirmer)
- Greeting (John Church)
- Hark! Hark, my Soul! (F. W. Faber) (Schirmer, 1923)
- Heaven is my Home (John Church)
- Her Rose (Two Love Songs, no. 2) (Jeanie Gallup Mottet) (Schirmer, 1914)
- He's Such a Lil' Trouble (John Church)
- The Hills of Dawn (Frank L. Stanton) (Schirmer)
- The Hills of Kerry (John Church)
- His Perfect Love (Schirmer)
- How Long Will Thou Forget Me? (Psalm xiii) (Schirmer, 1911)
- If I Knew (John Church)
- If You Became a Nun, Dear (John Church)
- In Heavenly Love Abiding (Schirmer)
- In Maytime (Frank L. Stanton) (John Church)
- In the End of Sabbath (Easter Song) (Schirmer)
- It Came Upon the Midnight Clear (Christmas Song) (Schirmer)
- The Joys of June (Schirmer)
- June-Time (Schirmer)
- The King of Love My Shepherd Is (John Church)
- The Lamp in the West (Schirmer)
- The Lane to Ballybree (Katherine Edelman) (Schirmer, 1921)
- The Lassie I Love Best (Schirmer)
- Let Not Your Heart be Troubled (John xiv: 27) (Schirmer, 1919)
- Life (John Church)
- Life's Joys (Schirmer)
- Life's Twilight (A love song) (Schirmer)
- Light at Evening-Time (Schirmer)
- The Little Christ is Coming Down (Christmas Carol) (Schirmer)
- Little House o' Dreams (Schirmer)
- Little One A'cryin' (John Church)
- A Little Way to Walk with You (Schirmer)
- Long Ago (John Church)
- The Lord is my Light (Psalm 27) (Schirmer, 1913)
- Love of Yesteryear (Schirmer)
- A Lover's Song (Schirmer)
- Memories (John Church)
- Memory of You (Schirmer)
- A Message (Schirmer)
- Morning (Frank L. Stanton) (Schirmer, 1910, T.I.S. reprint 1998)
- Mother (Schirmer)
- My Homeland (Schirmer)
- Never a Winter but Sang of May (John Church)
- The Night has a Thousand Eyes (John Church)
- Now the Day is Over (Schirmer)
- Ohio (Schirmer)
- O Master, Let me Walk with Thee (Schirmer)
- On the Road to Mandalay (Rudyard Kipling) (John Church, 1907)
- O That We Two were Maying (John Church)
- Out in the Blossoms (John Church)
- Over the Hills and Home Again (Schirmer)
- Pegging Along (Leslie Alan Taylor) (Schirmer, 1920)
- The Pilgrim (John Church)
- The Prayer Perfect (James Whitcomb Riley) (Schirmer, 1930)
- The Quiet Road (Schirmer)
- Rainbow-land (Schirmer)
- Realization (Schirmer)
- Reveries (Irene Stiles) (Schirmer)
- Roses After Rain (John Church)
- Saviour, Breathe an Evening Blessing (Schirmer)
- The Secret (Anonymous) (Schirmer, 1918)
- Serenade (Schirmer)
- Since Love Led Me to You (John Church)
- Since We Parted (John Church)
- Softly Now the Light of Day (Schirmer)
- Some Sweet Day (Schirmer)
- A Song of Gladness (Schirmer)
- Song of Spring (Schirmer)
- Song of Waiting (Schirmer)
- Star-eyes (Schirmer)
- The Star of hope (A Christ-child legend, Christmas Song) (Schirmer)
- Still, Still with Thee (Harriet Beecher Stowe) (John Church)
- Summer in the heart (Schirmer)
- Summer Skies (John Church)
- Summertime's Song (John Church)
- Sunshine and Happiness (Schirmer)
- The Sweet Story of Old (Schirmer)
- Sylvia (C. Scollard) (Schirmer, 1914)
- There's a Song in the Air (Christmas Song) (Schirmer)
- The Thought of You (Schirmer)
- Thou Wilt Keep Him in Perfect Peace (Isiah 26:3, Psalm 139:11) (Schirmer, 1913)
- Thy Will Be Done (John Church)
- To One Unknown (Schirmer)
- Toward the Sunrise (Schirmer)
- To you (M.B. Gannon) (Schirmer, 1910)
- Twilight and Dawn (Schirmer)
- Under the Wide and Starry Sky (John Church)
- The Vagabond (Schirmer)
- Were I a King! (Schirmer)
- When All the Bonny Birds (Schirmer)
- When Gazing in Thine Eyes So Dear (John Church)
- When June Days Come Again (Two Love Songs, no. 1) (Schirmer)
- When Love is Gone (John Church)
- When Mabel Sings (Frank L. Stanton) (John Church, 1902)
- When Stars are in the Quiet Skies (John Church)
- When the Boys Come Home (A martial melody) (J. Hay) (Schirmer, 1911)
- Where the Heart Is (John Church,1906)
- Where You, Beloved, Are (Schirmer)
- With Dreams of May (John Church)
- Your Smile (Schirmer)

Sacred Anthems, including:

- Gently, Lord, Oh, Gently Lead Us (Thomas Hastings, arr. Lucien Chaffin) (Schirmer, 1914)
- Now the Day is Over (Schirmer)

Choral Partsongs, including:

- In Maytime (Frank L. Stanton) (John Church)
