= Philip Bowen =

British actor

- Occupation: Actor
- Years active: 1976–2006

Philip Bowen is a British actor who has appeared in a number of British film and television roles including in The Man Who Made Husbands Jealous, Agatha Christie's Poirot, Kavanagh QC and Soldier Soldier. He was born in Sutton Coldfield, Warwickshire, in 1946.

Bowen's professional career started at Leatherhead in Puss in Boots playing the back end of the donkey. Seasons in rep followed at Guildford, Derby, Nottingham, Birmingham, Oxford and Newcastle as well as television, radio and some film work in Hollywood.

Foreign touring for the British Council, including three years with Sir Michael Redgrave coupled with seasons at Regent's Park and the Young Vic where he played Hamlet directed by Michael Bogdanov, developed a love for Shakespeare. Associations with Tim Carroll, Master of Verse at Shakespeare's Globe, included touring Germany and playing Prospero in Maidstone Prison with the inmates playing the other parts. He met his wife, Susannna Best, while they were touring with the English Shakespeare Company and together they set up the charity, Shakespeare Link. Their vision was to access Shakespeare beyond the confines of theatre or academe, as a stimulus for communication and debate. They worked in the community, with therapists, with young people and senior citizens as well as in hospitals and prisons; teaching, directing and performing took them to Poland, Bulgaria, Romania, Beirut, the Philippines, Tunisia, Mauritius, Indonesia, Malaysia, the US and Canada.

Now settled on the family smallholding in the Upper Wye Valley, they have been translating Shakespeare into BSL, working with local schools and groups and running 'Have-a-go Shakespeare' sessions with all comers. In 2006, they headed up a team to plant the magical Willow Globe, woven of living willow and open to the sky, which they run both as a producing and a receiving house. The Willow Globe Community Company has been invited to play CADW heritage sites and, by the RSC, to perform at Stratford.

In 1996, Bowen founded Shakespeare Link with his wife, Susanna Best (mother of the actress Eve Best), and is focused on broadening the appeal and accessibility of Shakespeare. This work was further extended with the establishment of the Willow Globe theatre on land at their home near Llanwrthwl, Powys, in Wales.
