= This Land Is Mine (film) =

1943 film by Jean Renoir

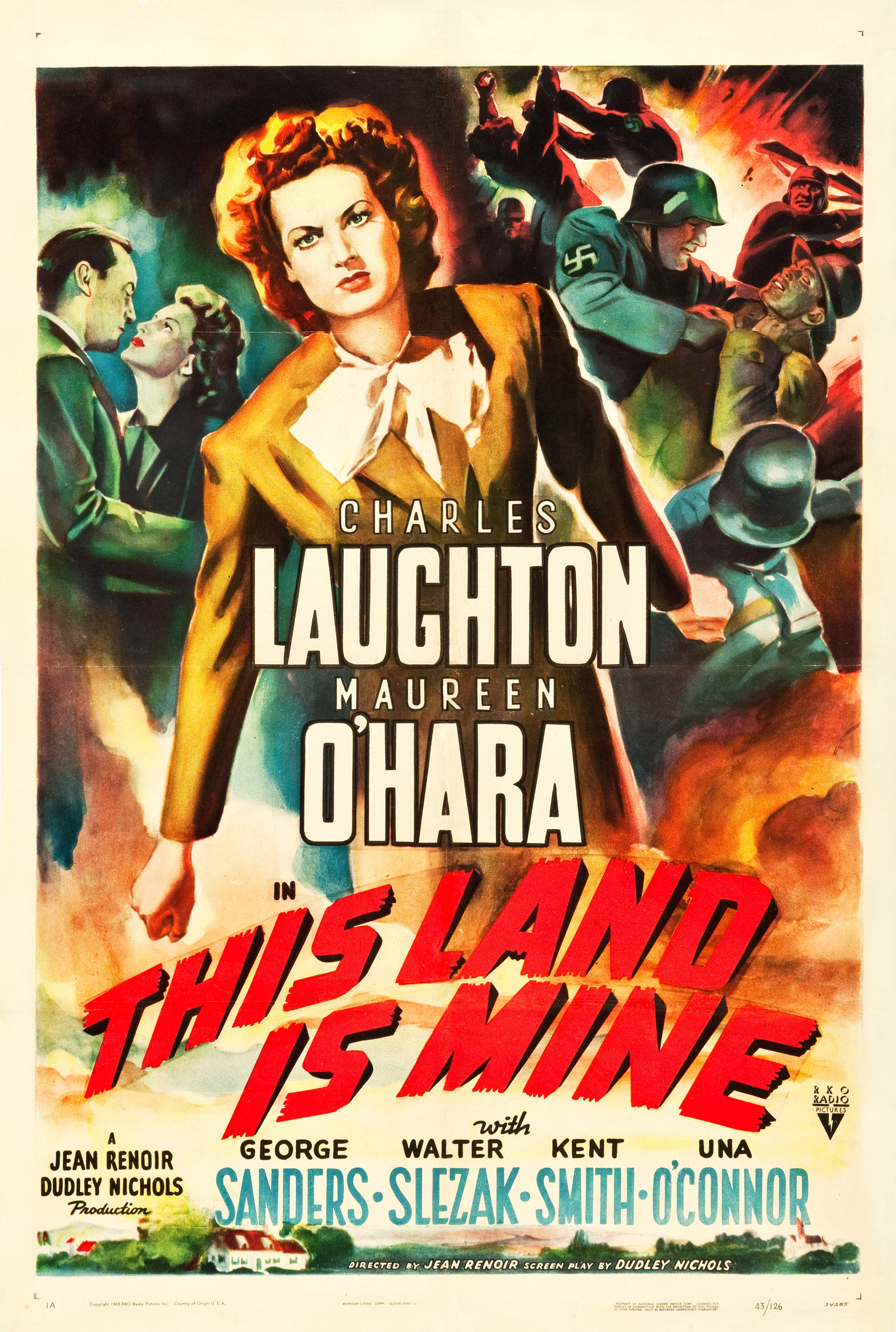
- Theatrical release poster
- Directed by: Jean Renoir
- Screenplay by: Dudley Nichols
- Produced by: Dudley Nichols
- Starring: Charles Laughton; Maureen O'Hara; George Sanders
- Cinematography: Frank Redman
- Edited by: Frederic Knudtson
- Music by: Lothar Perl; Friedrich Silcher
- Production company: Jean-Renoir-Dudly Nichols Productions
- Distributed by: RKO Radio Pictures
- Release date: May 7, 1943
- Running time: 103 minutes
- Country: United States
- Language: English
- Box office: $1.4 million (US rentals)

This Land Is Mine is a 1943 American war drama film directed by Jean Renoir and written and produced by Dudley Nichols. Starring Charles Laughton, Maureen O'Hara and George Sanders, the film is set in the midst of World War II in an unspecified place in German-occupied Europe that appears similar to France. Laughton plays Albert Lory, a cowardly school teacher in a town "somewhere in Europe" who is drawn into advocating resistance through his love of his country and of his fellow teacher Louise Martin, portrayed by O'Hara.

The film is one of the more acclaimed of the war films of the era. It won the 1944 Academy Award for Best Sound Recording (Stephen Dunn). Having opened simultaneously in 72 theaters, the film set a record for gross receipts on an opening day upon its release on May 7, 1943.

== Plot ==
Albert is an unmarried schoolmaster living with his dominating mother and secretly in love with his neighbour and fellow teacher Louise. Widely regarded as ineffectual, he embarrasses everybody by his panic during an Allied air raid. However, Louise is engaged to George, the head of the railway yard, who, like many in the town, believes that collaboration with the German occupation is the only logical course.

Her brother Paul, who works in the yard, is an active resister and, trying to kill the German commandant Major von Keller with a grenade, instead kills two German soldiers. After turning a blind eye to previous acts of resistance (such as a wrecked train) in the hope of preserving good relations with the town, von Keller must now act and takes 10 local hostages, one of whom is Albert, saying they will be shot in a week if the guilty person who threw the grenade is not found. Albert's mother, jealous of Louise, tells George that it was Paul. George tells von Keller and Paul is ambushed and killed. Albert is released and Louise assumes he informed on Paul to get his freedom.Von Keller then tells George to exploit Louise's grief to find out who Paul's accomplices were.George, unwilling take advantage of Louise, shoots himself. Albert bursts in a minute later, furious at discovering his mother's treachery, and is found with George's corpse and gun.

Regarding it as a matter for the civilian courts, the Germans expect Albert to be condemned. When in his defense he starts an impassioned plea for resistance, the prosecutor requests an adjournment. That night, von Keller comes to his cell and offers a deal: If he will keep quiet next day, new forged evidence will acquit him. To emphasize the point, in the morning the remaining hostages (including his friend Professor Sorel) are shot beneath his window. Back in court, Albert is all the more eloquent in the cause of liberty and the jurors proclaim him innocent. Freed and back in his schoolroom, with a proud Louise by his side, he is reading to the boys the Declaration of the Rights of Man and of the Citizen when German soldiers come to take him away. As the Germans come to arrest him, Albert passes the book to Louise, who continues reading.

== Cast ==
- Charles Laughton as Albert Lory
- Maureen O'Hara as Louise Martin
- George Sanders as George Lambert
- Walter Slezak as Major Erich von Keller
- Kent Smith as Paul Martin
- Una O'Connor as Mrs. Emma Lory
- Philip Merivale as Prof. Sorel
- Thurston Hall as Mayor Manville
- Ivan F. Simpson as Judge
- George Coulouris as Prosecutor
- Tommy Bond as Student
- Nancy Gates as Julie Grant
- John Donat as Edmund W. Lorraine

== Themes ==
Though the prime purpose of the film is propaganda to strengthen Allied resolve in the fight against Nazism, critics at the time and since have noted that Nichols and Renoir adopt a distinctively nuanced approach. The Germans, with von Keller an eloquent advocate of the advantages for Europe of Nazi rule, are not shown as mere brutes. Nor are the French, apart from the few mental or physical resisters, shown as heroes battling tyranny. Instead, some readings suggest that, as in Renoir's previous films La Grande Illusion and La Règle du Jeu, class may be more significant than race or nationality. For example, James Morrison cites how the film blames the bourgeoisie, a few left-wing intellectuals excepted, for letting Hitler into power in 1933, for surrendering France in 1940 and for collaborating actively or passively.

This stance was confirmed by Renoir shortly after the film came out when, in a speech, he asserted that his recent films "breathed this breath of anti-Fascism" and were rooted in the experience of the Popular Front of 1936, which was "a magnificent exposition of human brotherhood".

== Reception ==
In The Nation in 1943, critic James Agee wrote, "This Land is Mine eschews physical terror in favor of mental, and tries to give an exposition of the obligations of free men under those circumstances. That is a courageous but foredoomed idea. I doubt, first, whether physical and mental terror and obligation can in this context be separated ... This film ... is filled with bitter, anachronistic, interesting talent under pressures, but it is a question where the pressure begins and the self-deception ends."

In 1998, Jonathan Rosenbaum of the Chicago Reader included the film in his unranked list of the best American films not included on the AFI Top 100.
