= Gerard Francis Cobb =

Gerard Francis Cobb (Nettlestead, Kent, 15 October 1838 – 31 March 1904) was Junior Bursar of Trinity College, Cambridge. He was active as an Anglican layman, organist and amateur composer.

== Life ==
He was the fourth son of William Francis Cobb, rector of Nettlestead, Kent, and was educated at Marlborough College. He matriculated at Trinity College, Cambridge in 1857, graduating B.A. in 1861 and M.A. in 1864.

Cobb was an enthusiastic cyclist and was president of the Cambridge University Cycling Club. He was first president in 1878 of the National Cyclists' Union, originally the Bicycle Union.

He died in Cambridge on 31 March 1904.

== Music ==
Cobb is best remembered for his hymns and settings of Rudyard Kipling's Barrack-Room Ballads. The poems set by Cobb include "To T. A." (1892), "The Young British Soldier" Op. 24 No. 1, "Mandalay", "Route Marchin’" "Soldier, Soldier", "Fuzzy-Wuzzy" Op. 24 No. 5 (1892) "Troopin’", "Ford o' Kabul River" Op. 26 No. 2 (1893) "Danny Deever", "Shillin’ a Day" "Cells", "Belts Op. 29 No. 1" "The Widow's Party", "Screw-Guns", "Gunga Din" Op. 29 No. 4, "Oonts" Op. 29 No. 5, "Snarleyow" Op. 29 No. 6, "For to Admire", "Back to the Army Again", and "Tommy".

These songs were recorded by Ralph Meanley (baritone) and David Mackie (piano) for Campion in 2007. A smaller selection including "Lichtenberg" (1904), was recorded by Michael Halliwell (baritone), David Miller (piano) for ABC Classics, Australia.

== Family ==
Cobb married in 1893 Elizabeth Lucy, daughter of John Welchman Whateley, of Birmingham and widow of Stephen Parkinson, tutor of St John's College, Cambridge; she survived him without issue. He gave up his posts at Trinity on marrying.
