= Masks or Faces =

1888 book by William Archer

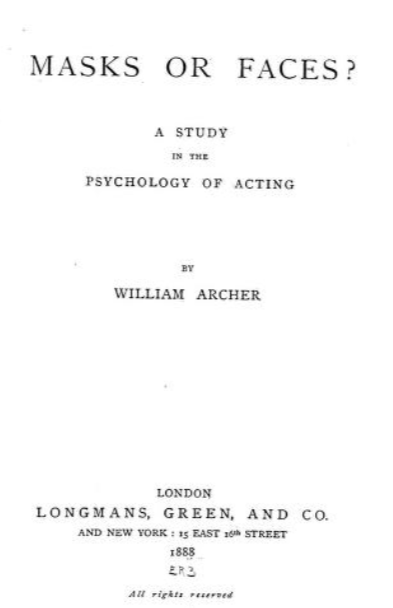
- Title page for Masks or Faces? A Study in the Psychology of Acting (1888)
- Author: William Archer
- Genre: Psychology
- Publication date: 1888

Masks or Faces? A Study in the Psychology of Acting is an 1888 book by William Archer. It is based on a series of articles entitled “The Anatomy of Acting” that he had previously published in Longman's Magazine.

== History ==
Archer intended his study to discredit Denis Diderot’s 18th-century work Paradoxe sur le Comedién which had just been translated into English some five years before. Diderot maintained that masterful acting must not include emotional involvement on the part of the actor. This style of acting, reliant on physical technique over emotional truth, was still much in vogue in the late 19th century, particularly in France. The Paradoxe was also the subject of an ongoing debate between Henry Irving, Britain's most prominent actor, and Benoît-Constant Coquelin, who was the leading actor of the Comedié Française.

In order to make his case, Archer circulated a series of questions to as many professional actors as were willing. Many British actors refused or even derided the project. Prominent French critics refused to help him which severely limited his access to actors on the Continent.

Some actors did help. Among them were Janet Achurch, Herbert Beerbohm Tree, Arthur Wing Pinero, and Tommaso Salvini. Archer collected, analyzed, and presented their answers in his work, along with a survey of testimony of famous actors in history, including Edward Alleyn, David Garrick, Thomas Betterton, and William Charles Macready.

== Conclusions ==
Some of the conclusions of Archer's research included:

- While it is possible for an actor to sometimes affect an audience without being personally affected, a higher level of performance can be achieved through personal investment.
- Actors regularly report that emotions whose source remains outside the world of the play can positively affect the performance without causing the loss of control Diderot objects to.
- Laughter, a behavior notoriously difficult to mimic, can often be inspired in an actor playing a role multiple times.
- An actor is capable of sustaining multiple threads of consciousness, and can simultaneously be aware of the realities of stage business while truly experiencing the emotion of the play. For this reason, an actor playing Othello can both attempt to strangle Iago and refrain from causing the fellow actor bodily harm.

== Influence ==
Masks or Faces ultimately failed to put debate over Diderot completely to rest, but it did reinvigorate it. It also served as a key step in his campaign to bring both psychological realism and the plays of Henrik Ibsen to the British theatre.

William James referenced The Anatomy of Acting as a particularly apt analysis of actors' emotions in his Principles of Psychology.

One of Archer's few foreign respondents, Tommaso Salvini, also served as one inspiration for Constantin Stanislavski in the development of his System of acting.

Lee Strasberg lists Masks or Faces (along with Diderot) among the influences he used to develop the Method.
