= Green goddess dressing =

Salad dressing variety

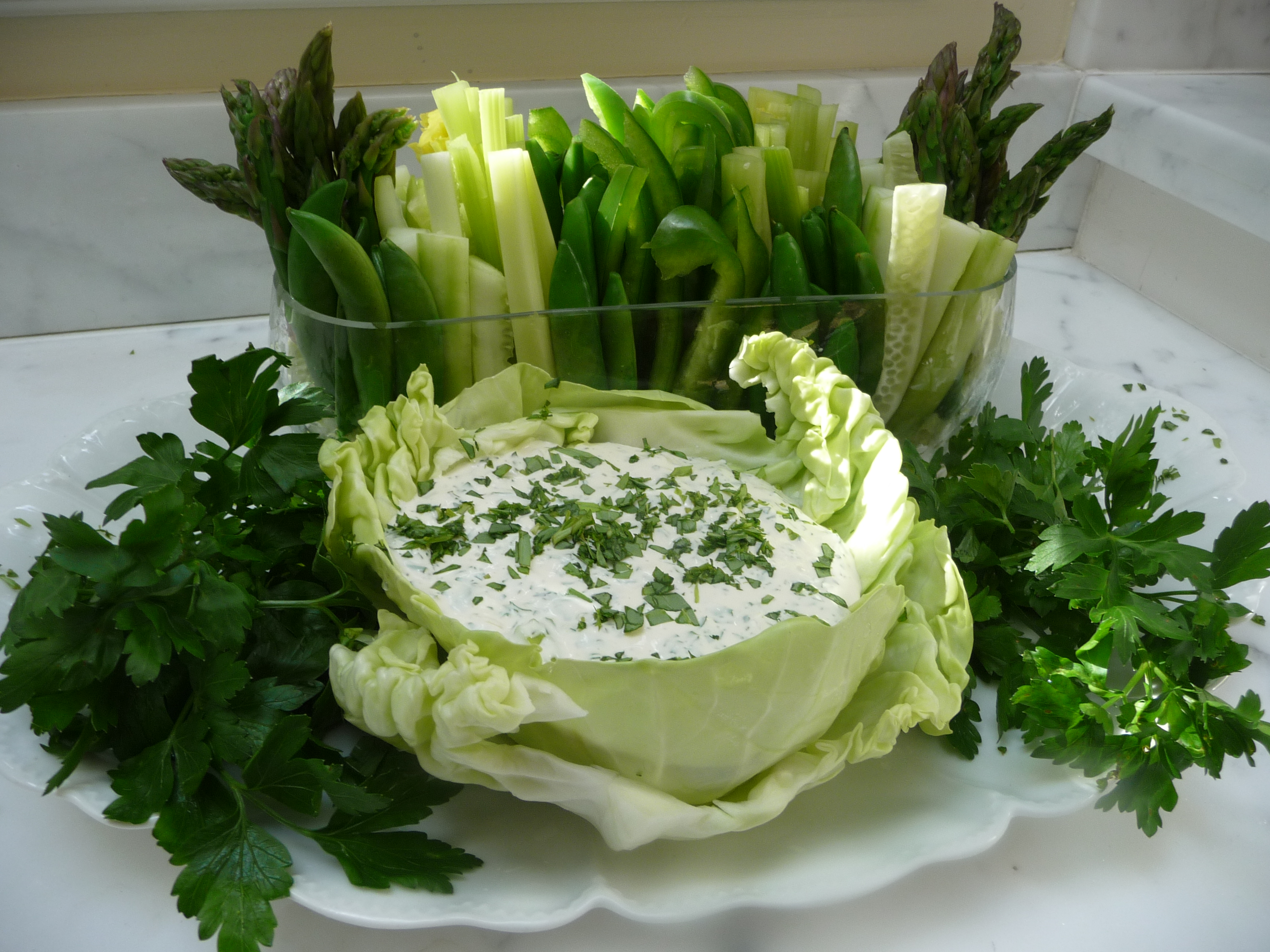
- Served as a vegetable dip
- Type: Salad dressing or dip
- Place of origin: United States
- Main ingredients: Mayonnaise, sour cream, chervil, chives, anchovy, tarragon, lemon juice, pepper

Green goddess is a salad dressing, typically containing mayonnaise, sour cream, chervil, chives, anchovy, tarragon, lemon juice, and pepper.

== History ==
The dressing is named for its tint. The most accepted theory regarding its origins points to the Palace Hotel in San Francisco in 1923, when the hotel's executive chef Philip Roemer wanted something to pay tribute to actor George Arliss and his hit play, The Green Goddess. He then concocted this dressing, which, like the play, became a hit. This dressing, which contained anchovies, scallions, parsley, tarragon, chives, mayonnaise, and vinegar, is a variation of a dressing originated in France by a chef to Louis XIII who made a sauce au vert (green sauce) which was traditionally served with "green eel".

In 1948, the New York Times published a recipe for the dressing that included Worcestershire sauce. Later recipes have included variations such as the addition of avocado or basil.

In the early 1970s, salad dressing maker Seven Seas produced a bottled version of this dressing. It is still made in limited quantities.
