= Ivan Simpson =

Scottish actor (1875–1951)

Ivan F. Simpson
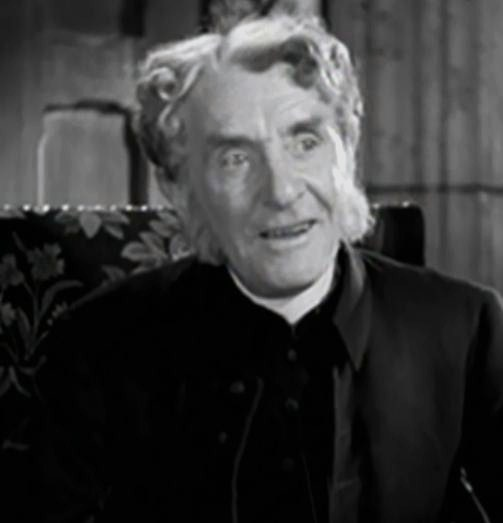
- Simpson as Reverend Mordaunt in Little Lord Fauntleroy (1936)
- Born: 8 February 1875; Glasgow, Scotland
- Died: 12 October 1951 (aged 76); New York City, U.S.
- Other names: Ivan Simpson, I. F. Simpson
- Occupation: Actor
- Years active: (probably before) 1906–1951

Ivan F. Simpson (8 February 1875 – 12 October 1951) was a Scottish film and stage actor.

== Life and career ==
Simpson was born on 8 February 1875 in Glasgow, Scotland, and went as a young man to New York City, where he worked for four decades on Broadway from 1906 until his death. In 1915 he started his film silent career and starred in notable silent films like The Green Goddess from 1923, where he played the role of Mister Watkins. He also replied in this role seven years later in the sound film version of The Green Goddess. In 1929 he portrayed Hugh Myers in Disraeli, where he played along his close friend George Arliss. Arliss and Simpson appeared together in a total of nine films.

Especially in the 1930s, Simpson was a successful character actor in supporting and bit parts and appeared in many classics. He often played servants, like in MGM's literature adaption David Copperfield as Littimer and the horror movie Mark of the Vampire. He also portrayed priests like in Little Lord Fauntleroy and Random Harvest, judges like in This Land Is Mine or doctors like in They All Kissed the Bride. Simpson was also a frequent actor in the Errol Flynn movies, he appeared in The Adventures of Robin Hood, The Prince and the Pauper and Captain Blood.

== Selected filmography ==
- The Dictator (1915) – Simpson
- Out of the Drifts (1916) – Martin
- The Man Who Played God (1922) – Battle
- The Green Goddess (1923) – Watkins
- Twenty-One (1923) – Mr. Willis
- Twenty Dollars a Week (1925) – James Pettison
- Miss Bluebeard (1925) – Bounds
- Wild, Wild Susan (1925) – Malcolm
- Lovers in Quarantine (1925) – The Silent Passenger
- A Kiss for Cinderella (1925) – Mr. Cutaway
- Womanhandled (1925) – Butler (uncredited)
- Disraeli (1929) – Sir Hugh Myers (uncredited)
- Evidence (1929) – Peabody
- The Green Goddess (1930) – Watkins
- Isle of Escape (1930) – Judge
- Golden Dawn (1930) – Minor Role (uncredited)
- Inside the Lines (1930) – Capper
- Manslaughter (1930) – Morson
- Old English (1930) – Joe Pillin
- The Way of All Men (1930) – Higgins
- The Sea God (1930) – Pearly Nick
- The Lady Who Dared (1931) – Butler
- The Millionaire (1931) – Davis
- The Reckless Hour (1931) – Stevens – Adams' Butler (uncredited)
- Safe in Hell (1931) – Crunch
- The Man Who Played God (1932) – Battle
- A Passport to Hell (1932) – Simms
- The Crash (1932) – Hodge
- The Phantom of Crestwood (1932) – Mr. Vayne
- Sherlock Holmes (1932) – Faulkner
- The Monkey's Paw (1933) – Mr. White
- The Past of Mary Holmes (1933) – Jacob Riggs
- The Secret of Madame Blanche (1933) – Aubrey's Lawyer (uncredited)
- The Silk Express (1933) – Johnson, Kilgore's Secretary
- Midnight Mary (1933) – Tindle
- Voltaire (1933) – Lelain – Actor (uncredited)
- Blind Adventure (1933) – Perkins—Butler (uncredited)
- Charlie Chan's Greatest Case (1933) – Brade
- Her Secret (1933) – Lathrop
- Man of Two Worlds (1934) – Dr. Lott
- The Mystery of Mr. X (1934) – Hutchinson
- The House of Rothschild (1934) – Amschel Rothschild
- Murder in Trinidad (1934) – First Doctor (uncredited)
- Stingaree (1934) – Man with Beard (uncredited)
- The World Moves On (1934) – Clumber
- British Agent (1934) – Poohbah Evans
- Among the Missing (1934) – Smeed
- The Little Minister (1934) – Sanders Webster (uncredited)
- David Copperfield (1935) – Littimer
- Shadow of Doubt (1935) – Morse
- Mark of the Vampire (1935) – Jan
- The Bishop Misbehaves (1935) – Mr. Grantham
- Mutiny on the Bounty (1935) – Morgan
- Splendor (1935) – Fletcher
- East of Java (1935) – Resident (uncredited)
- The Great Impersonation (1935) – Dr. Harrison
- Captain Blood (1935) – Prosecutor
- Little Lord Fauntleroy (1936) – Rev. Mordaunt
- Trouble for Two (1936) – Collins
- Mary of Scotland (1936) – Judge
- Lloyd's of London (1936) – Old Man
- Maid of Salem (1937) – Rev. Parris
- The Prince and the Pauper (1937) – Clemens
- Night of Mystery (1937) – Sproot
- London by Night (1937) – Burroughs
- Youth on Parole (1937) – Minor Role (uncredited)
- 45 Fathers (1937) – Chamberlain (uncredited)
- The Baroness and the Butler (1938) – Count Dormo
- Invisible Enemy (1938) – Michael
- The Adventures of Robin Hood (1938) – Proprietor of Kent Road Tavern
- Kidnapped (1938) – Old Man (uncredited)
- Marie Antoinette (1938) – Sauce (uncredited)
- Booloo (1938) – 1st Governor
- Made for Each Other (1939) – Simon – Judge Doolittle's Brother (uncredited)
- Never Say Die (1939) – Kretsky
- The Sun Never Sets (1939) – A Doctor (uncredited)
- The Adventures of Sherlock Holmes (1939) – Gates – Trial Prosecutor (uncredited)
- Rulers of the Sea (1939) – Secretary (uncredited)
- Tower of London (1939) – Anne's Protector (uncredited)
- The Earl of Chicago (1940) – Hargraves (uncredited)
- The Invisible Man Returns (1940) – Mr. Cotton (uncredited)
- New Moon (1940) – Guizot
- The Body Disappears (1941) – Dean Claxton
- Nazi Agent (1942) – Professor Sterling
- The Male Animal (1942) – Dean Frederick Damon
- They All Kissed the Bride (1942) – Dr. Cassell
- Eagle Squadron (1942) – Simms (uncredited)
- Youth on Parade (1942) – Dean Wharton
- Nightmare (1942) – Arnold – Money Changer
- Random Harvest (1942) – The Vicar
- My Kingdom for a Cook (1943) – Dexter
- Two Weeks to Live (1943) – Professor Albert Frisby
- This Land Is Mine (1943) – Judge
- Above Suspicion (1943) – Porter in Oxford (uncredited)
- My Kingdom for a Cook (1943) – Professor Harlow
- Government Girl (1943) – Judge Leonard (uncredited)
- Jane Eyre (1943) – Mr. Woods – the Minister (uncredited)
- The Uninvited (1944) – Will Hardy – Tobacconist (uncredited)
- The Hour Before the Dawn (1944) – Magistrate (uncredited)
- My Girl Tisa (1948) – Old Man (uncredited)
