= Soldier, soldier won't you marry me =

Folk song

Song
- Genre: Folk
- Songwriter: Traditional

"Soldier, Soldier, Won't You Marry Me?" (Roud 489), also known as "Soldier John" and "Soldier, Soldier," is an English traditional folk song. Fresno State University gives the earliest collected date as 1903 in America, and it was collected many times in Tennessee and North Carolina in the early 1900s. It was printed in "Games and Songs of American Children" by William Wells Newell. However the song was collected many times over in a short period of time, including Cecil Sharp in 1917, Anne Gilchrist in Scotland in 1919 and Seamus Ennis in Ireland. Among many classical arrangements, Peter Pears made an arrangement of the song in 1936.

== Lyrics ==
The song concerns a woman seeking marriage of a soldier, who demurs for want of proper apparel (hat, coat, boots, etc.). She proceeds to fetch him, from her grandfather's chest, each article he asks for, one by one, in each respective verse. At the end, asked once again to marry her, the soldier, all dressed in her grandfather's clothing, refuses once more, revealing that he is already married.

== Commercial recordings ==
- Gid Tanner and his Skillet Lickers - The Very Best Of (1930)
- Harry Belafonte - Mark Twain and Other Folk Favorites (1954) and Legends Day O (2012)
- Isla Cameron - Through Bushes and Briars (1956)
- Bandogg - Bandoggs (1978)
- Vic Shepherd and John Bowden - A Motty Down (1982)
- Brass Monkey - Sound and Rumour (1998)
- Natalie Merchant - The House Carpenter's Daughter (2003).

== In popular culture ==
In the season 2 episode of Lost in Space titled "The Dream Monster", Angela Cartwright's character Penny Robinson sings this song while watering plants.

In the 1990 film Dances with Wolves, Kevin Costner's character sings this song as he swims in a creek near Fort Sedgwick.

In the 1982 VHS Golden Nursery Rhymes, a version of this nursery rhyme is sung, with two puppets reenacting the story.
