= Barrack-Room Ballads =

Series of songs and poems by Rudyard Kipling

First (1892) edition of Barrack-Room Ballads and Other Verses (publ. Methuen)

The Barrack-Room Ballads are a series of songs and poems by Rudyard Kipling, dealing with the late-Victorian British Army and mostly written in a vernacular dialect. The series contains some of Kipling's best-known works, including the poems "Gunga Din", "Tommy", "Mandalay", and "Danny Deever", helping consolidate his early fame as a poet.

The first poems were published in the Scots Observer in the first half of 1890, and collected in Barrack-Room Ballads and Other Verses in 1892. Kipling later returned to the theme in a group of poems collected in The Seven Seas under the same title. A third group of vernacular Army poems from the Boer War, titled "Service Songs" and published in The Five Nations (1903), can be considered part of the Ballads, as can a number of other uncollected pieces.

== Defining the canon ==
While two volumes of Kipling's poems are clearly labelled as "Barrack-Room Ballads", identifying which poems should be grouped in this way can be complex.

The main collection of the Ballads was published in the 1890s, in two volumes: Barrack-Room Ballads and Other Verses (1892, the first major publishing success for Methuen) and The Seven Seas (1896), sometimes published as The Seven Seas and Further Barrack-Room Ballads. In both books, they were collected into a specific section set aside from the other poems, and can be easily identified. (Barrack-Room Ballads and Other Verses has an introductory poem ("To T.A.") in Kipling's own voice, which is strictly not part of the set but is often collected with them.)

A third group of poems, published in 1903 in The Five Nations, continued the theme of military vernacular ballads; while they were titled "Service Songs", they fit well with the themes of the earlier ballads and are clearly connected.

Charles Carrington produced the first comprehensive volume of the Ballads in 1973, mainly drawn from these three collections but including five additional pieces not previously collected under the title. Three of these date from the same period: an untitled vernacular poem ("My girl she gave me the go onst") taken from a short story, The Courting of Dinah Shadd, in Life's Handicap (1891); Bobs (1893), a poem praising Lord Roberts; and The Absent-Minded Beggar (1899), a poem written to raise funds for the families of soldiers called up for the Boer War.

The remaining two date from the First World War; Carrington considered Epitaphs of the War, written in a first-person style, and Gethsemane, also in a soldier's voice, to meet his definition. Both were published in The Years Between (1919). Kipling wrote profusely on military themes during the war, but often from a more detached perspective than the first-person vernacular he had previously adopted.

Finally, there are some confusingly captioned pieces. Many of Kipling's short stories were introduced with a short fragment of poetry, sometimes from an existing poem and sometimes an incidental new piece. These were often identified "A Barrack-Room Ballad", though not all the poems they were taken from would otherwise be collected or classed this way. This includes pieces such as the introductory poem to My Lord the Elephant (from Many Inventions, 1899), later collected in Songs from Books but not identified as a Ballad. It is not clear if these were deliberately omitted by Carrington or if he explicitly chose not to include them.

=== The poems ===
From Barrack-Room Ballads and Other Verses

- "Dedication: To T.A."
- "Danny Deever"
- "Tommy"
- "Fuzzy-Wuzzy"
- "Soldier, Soldier"
- "Screw-Guns"
- "Cells"
- "Gunga Din"
- "Oonts"
- "Loot"
- "Snarleyow"
- "The Widow at Windsor"
- "Belts"
- "The Young British Soldier"
- "Mandalay"
- "Troopin'"
- "The Widow's Party"
- "Ford o' Kabul River"
- "Gentlemen-Rankers"
- "Route Marchin'"
- "Shillin' a Day"

From The Seven Seas

- "Back to the Army Again"
- "Birds of Prey" March
- "Soldier an' Sailor Too"
- "Sappers"
- "That Day"
- "The Men That Fought at Minden"
- "Cholera Camp"
- "The Ladies"
- "Bill 'Awkins"
- "The Mother Lodge"
- "Follow Me 'Ome"
- "The Sergeant's Weddin'"
- "The Jacket"
- "The 'Eathen"
- "The Shut-Eye Sentry"
- "Mary, Pity Women!"
- "For to Admire"

Uncollected

- Bobs
- "My girl she gave me the go onst..."

== Reception ==
T. S. Eliot, in his essay on Kipling for his 1941 anthology A Choice of Kipling's Verse, writes that many writers have written verse without writing poetry, but that Kipling was unusual in that he did write poetry without setting out to do so. In Eliot's view, this makes Kipling a 'ballad-writer', and that was already, he thought, more difficult in 1941 than in Kipling's time, as people no longer had the music hall to inspire them. Eliot thought Kipling's ballads unusual, also, in that Kipling had been careful to make it possible to absorb each ballad's message on a single hearing. But, wrote Eliot, Kipling had more to offer than that: he had "a consummate gift of word, phrase, and rhythm", never repeated himself, and used short, simple stanzas and rhyming schemes. What is more

The variety of form which Kipling manages to devise for his ballads is remarkable: each is distinct, and perfectly fitted to the content and the mood which the poem has to convey. Nor is the versification too regular...

— T.S. Eliot

== See also ==
- List of the works of Rudyard Kipling
- 1892 in poetry
- 1896 in poetry
- The Whiffenpoof Song (adapted from Gentlemen-Rankers)

== Bibliography ==
- Eliot, T. S. (1941). A Choice of Kipling's Verse, made by T. S. Eliot with an essay on Rudyard Kipling. Faber and Faber.

--- (1963) paperback edition, Faber and Faber
