= William Archer (critic) =

19th/20th-century Scottish writer and critic

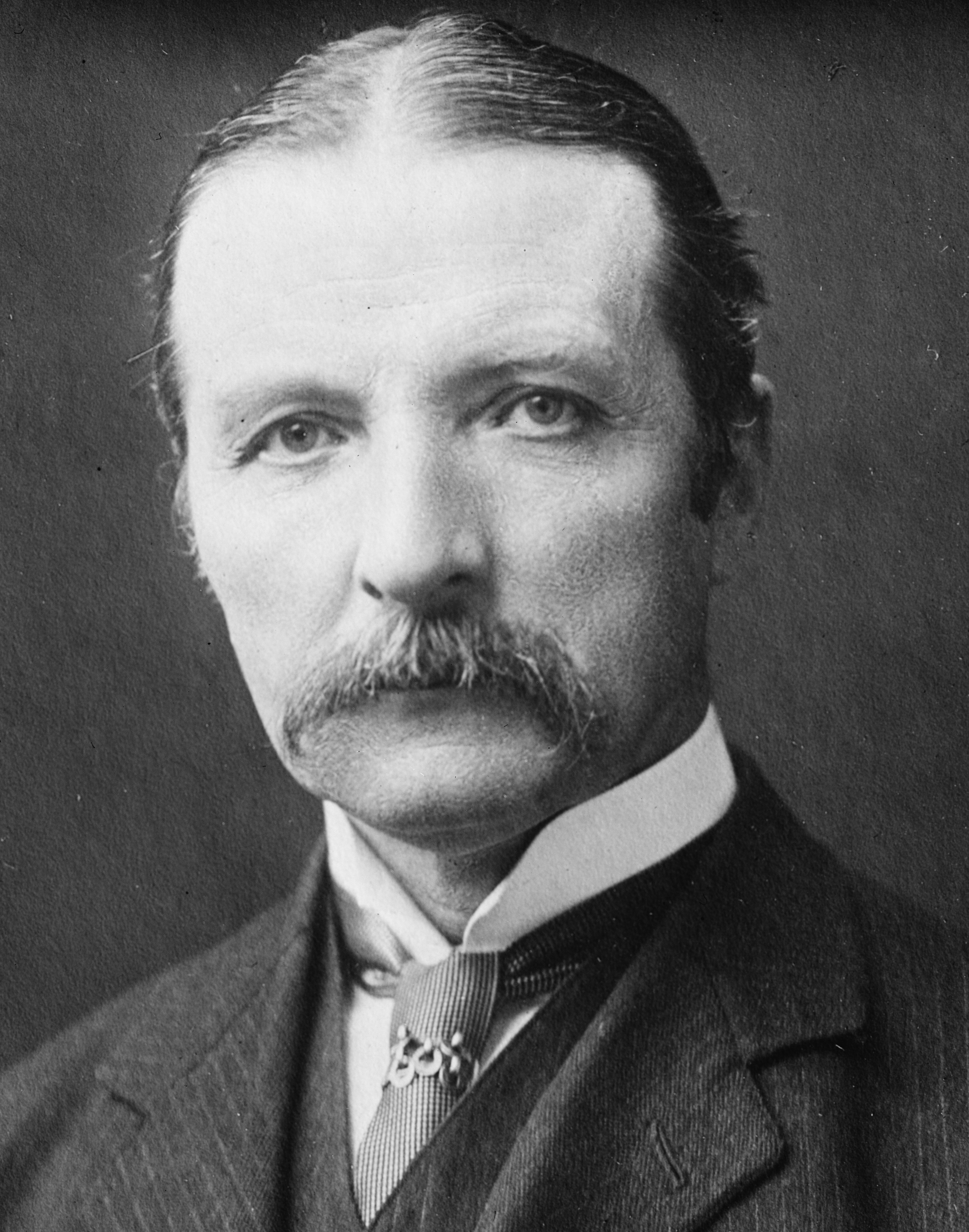
- Born: 23 September 1856; Perth, Scotland
- Died: 27 December 1924 (aged 68); London, England
- Education: Middle Temple; University of Edinburgh
- Occupations: Writer, theatre critic
- Spouse: Frances Elizabeth Trickett (m. 1884)
- Children: 3 sons
- Father: Thomas Archer

William Archer (23 September 1856 – 27 December 1924) was a Scottish author, theatre critic, and English spelling reformer based, for most of his career, in London. He was an early advocate of the plays of Henrik Ibsen, and a friend and advocate of George Bernard Shaw.

== Life and career ==
Archer was born in Perth, the eldest boy of the nine children of Thomas Archer and his wife Grace, née Morrison. Thomas relocated frequently seeking employment, and William attended schools in Perth, Lymington, Reigate and Edinburgh. He spent parts of his boyhood with relatives in Norway where he became fluent in Norwegian and became acquainted with the literature of Henrik Ibsen.

Archer won a bursary to the University of Edinburgh to study English literature, moral and natural philosophy, and mathematics. When the family relocated to Australia in 1872, he remained in Scotland as a student. While still at the university he became a leader-writer for the Edinburgh Evening News in 1875, and after a year visiting his family in Australia, he returned to Edinburgh. In 1878, in accordance with his father's wishes, he relocated to London to train as a barrister. He was uninterested in law, and was by now fascinated with theatre, but he entered the Middle Temple and became a barrister in 1883: he never practised. He supported himself by working as dramatic critic of The London Figaro, and after he finished his legal studies he began working for The World, which he continued from 1884 to 1906. In London he soon became known well for his work.

Archer played an important part in introducing Ibsen to the English public, starting with his translation of The Pillars of Society, produced at the Gaiety Theatre in 1880. It was the first play by Ibsen to be produced in London but was little known. He also translated, alone or in collaboration, other productions of Scandinavian drama: Ibsen's A Doll's House (1889), The Master Builder (1893, with Edmund Gosse); Edvard Brandes's A Visit (1892); Ibsen's Peer Gynt (1892, with Charles Archer); Georg Brandes "William Shakespeare"; (1895) Little Eyolf (1895); and John Gabriel Borkman (1897); and he edited Ibsen's Prose Dramas (1890–1891).

In 1881, Archer met Frances Elizabeth Trickett (1855–1929), the youngest of the eight children of John Trickett, a retired engineer. They married in October 1884; the next year they had their only child, Tom (1885–1918), who was killed in action in the First World War. The marriage was enduring and companionable, although Archer began a relationship in 1891, which lasted for the rest of his life, with the actress Elizabeth Robins.

In 1897, Archer, along with Robins, Henry William Massingham, and Alfred Sutro, formed the Provisional Committee to organise an association to produce plays they considered to be of high literary merit, such as Ibsen's. The association was named the "New Century Theatre" but was a disappointment by 1899, although it continued until at least 1904. In 1899, a more successful association, named the Stage Society, was formed to replace it.

Archer was an early friend of George Bernard Shaw, and arranged for his plays to be translated into German. An attempted collaboration on a play failed, although Shaw later used their joint ideas for his early work, Widower's Houses. By Archer's influence Shaw obtained the post of art critic to the periodical The World, before becoming its music critic. A biographer, J. P. Wearing, says of their relationship:

Their intimate friendship could also be very turbulent, since both men were forthright and honest. Shaw respected Archer's intelligence and integrity, and penetrated his formality and deliberately cultivated dour Scots façade. Archer thought Shaw brilliant if perverse, and concluded that he never achieved his great potential because he was too much a jester.

During the First World War, Archer worked for the official War Propaganda Bureau. After the war, he achieved financial success with his play The Green Goddess, produced by Winthrop Ames at the Booth Theatre in New York City in 1921. It was a melodrama, and a popular success, although, he admitted, of much less importance for the art of the drama than his critical work.

Archer died in a London nursing home in 1924 of post-operative complications after the removal of a kidney tumour. Reviewing his life and career, Wearing's summary is that Archer was "a clear, logical man whom some saw as too narrowly rationalistic", but who was perceptive, intuitive and imaginative. Wearing attributes Archer's great influence as a critic to these qualities and to the length of time for which he was engaged in the theatre and reviewing, although

[he] had his blind spots, as in his failure to understand Chekhov, Strindberg, and Shaw, but he was incorruptibly honest and unwaveringly committed to the improvement of ... the theatre. His pioneering advocacy of Ibsen in England cannot be underestimated ... although his other contributions to the theatre are equally valuable.

Archer and Walter Ripman compiled the first dictionary for the English spelling reform system Nue Spelling, which would assist the development of SoundSpel.

== Works ==
=== Critical works ===
- English Dramatists of To-day (1882)
- Henry Irving, a study (1883)
- About The Theatre: Essays and Studies (1886)
- Masks or Faces? A Study in the Psychology of Acting (1888)
- W. C. Macready, a biography (1890)
- Alan's Wife; a Dramatic Study in Three Scenes (1893)
- "The Theatrical World for..." (1893–97), in five volumes
- America To-day, Observations and Reflections (1900)
- Poets of the Younger Generation (1901) John Lane, the Bodley Head, London
- Real Conversations (1904)
- A National Theatre: Scheme and Estimates, with H. Granville Barker, (1907)
- Through Afro-America (1910)
- The Life, Trial, and Death of Francisco Ferrer (1911)
- Play-Making (1912)
- India and the Future (1917)
- The Old Drama and the New (1923)

=== Essays ===
- The Great Analysis: A Plea for a Rational World-Order (1912). Introduction by Gilbert Murray

=== Plays ===
- War Is War (1919)
- The Green Goddess (1921)
