= The Devil (1918 Hungarian film) =

- Directed by: Michael Curtiz
- Written by: Iván Siklósi
- Based on: The Devil by Ferenc Molnár
- Release date: 5 October 1918 (Hungary)
- Country: Hungary
- Language: Hungarian

The Devil (Hungarian: Az ördög) (1918) is a Hungarian film version of Ferenc Molnár's play, directed by Michael Curtiz. The film was remade for American audiences by James Young in 1921, starring George Arliss in his film debut.

== Production background ==
From the original ad campaign, "Here is a story mounted in settings and scenes of splendor and luxury. A story that is as old as yesterday; as true as today; and as new as tomorrow. A production of real mark and unexcelled distinction. As the central figure George Arliss is an unforgettable picture of fiendish, subtle, domineering and diabolic ingenuity; of cunning, sardonic and unrelenting resourcefulness. Yet he is the suave, charming, polished and artistic Devil."

This satiric drama was based on the 1908 play by Ferenc Molnar that launched Arliss on Broadway, and was used to entice him into his very first (of many) films. Earlier versions were made by no less than Thomas Edison and D.W. Griffith. The original play title was "The Devil; A Comedy in Three Acts." In an interview from Motion Picture World, January 1921, Mr. Arliss told reporters he decided to go into films, after being impressed by the work of Charlie Chaplin. The director then made a screen test to show Arliss how intimate the camera was, and how it exaggerated gestures. Arliss said films would probably lead to better acting on the stage, when actors could study their technique on the big screen.

== Plot ==
Dr. Muller (Arliss), a friend to all, finds pleasure in turning the goodness in people to evil ends. He meets Marie Matin (Lucy Cotton) and her fiancé, Georges Roben (Roland Bottomley), while viewing a new painting, "The Martyr-Truth Crucified by Evil." Marie declares that the picture was wrong: Evil could never triumph over Truth, and though Muller says he agrees with her, he plots to prove otherwise. To this end, he entangles Marie with artist Paul de Veaux (Edmund Lowe), Georges's best friend, causing the latter's model, Mimi (Sylvia Breamer), to become jealous. Georges, believing that he is standing between Paul and Marie, releases Marie from her engagement. Marie finds Paul and Mimi alone together, late one evening, and turns back to Georges, whom she marries. This does not discourage Muller, who but for Marie's purity almost succeeds in his evil designs. As a last resort, Muller lures Marie to his apartment to trick her. There in a moment of dramatic conflict—she prays for help; a vision of a shining cross appears; and Muller is consumed in flames. Note: This was also the first film for Fredric March and Mrs. George Arliss.

== Preservation status ==
This once lost film has recently been rediscovered and is now being restored by the Library of Congress Motion Picture Conservation Center in Dayton, Ohio.

On a 2010 episode of The History Channel series American Pickers the show's hosts are invited to search under the stage of a turn of the century theater and film hall. Under the stage, they find a dusty stack of old movie posters, the main and most vivid being a forgotten poster for the 1921 version of The Devil.

== See also ==
- List of rediscovered films
- The Devil (1921 film)
