= Marjorie Gateson =

American actress (1891–1977)

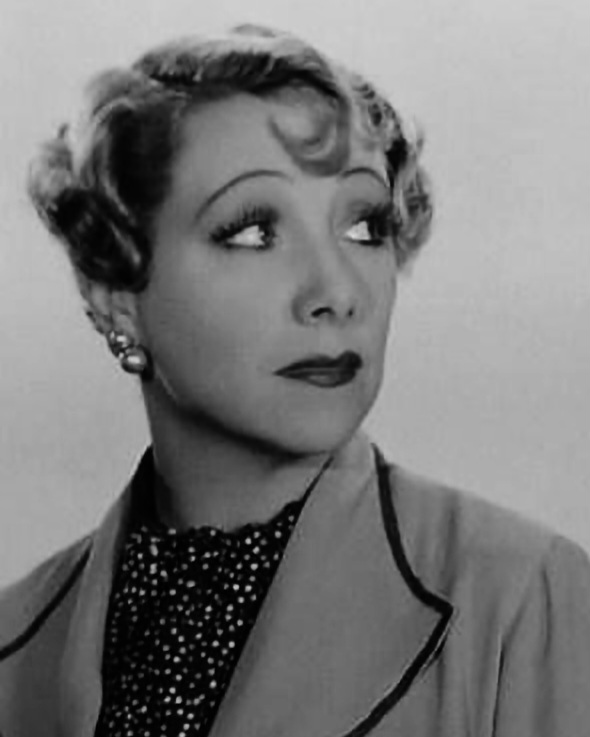
- Gateson in 1935
- Born: Marjorie Augusta Gateson; January 17, 1891; Brooklyn, New York, U.S.
- Died: April 17, 1977 (aged 86); New York City, U.S.
- Occupation: Actress
- Years active: 1912–1968

Marjorie Augusta Gateson (January 17, 1891 – April 17, 1977) was an American stage and film actress.

== Early years ==
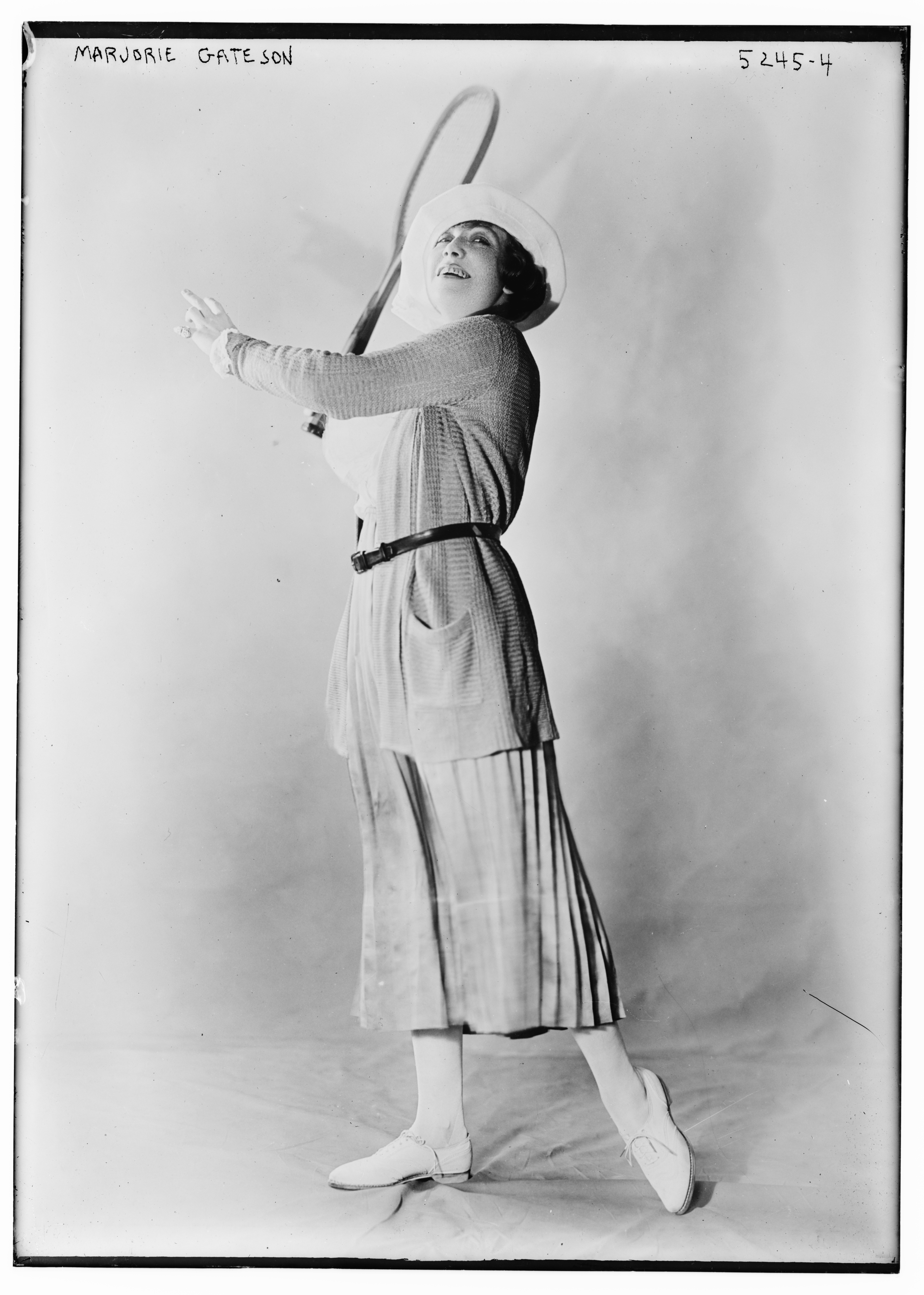
Gateson in 1920.

Gateson was born in Brooklyn, New York, to Augusta and Daniel Gateson. Her maternal grandfather and brother were clergymen; Some sources state her father was one too, but Axel Nissen in his book Mothers, Mammies and Old Maids: Twenty-Five Character Actresses of Golden Age Hollywood writes that he was a contractor. She attended the Packer Collegiate Institute and the Brooklyn Conservatory of Music, the latter being where her mother taught elocution. She believed her mother had "an inner longing for the stage", which she passed on to Marjorie, along with diction and poise.

== Career ==
Gateson's musical schooling helped her land a job in the chorus in a play called The Pink Lady. She made her Broadway debut at the age of 21 in the chorus of the musical The Dove of Peace on November 4, 1912; the show closed after 12 performances. During the much longer run of her next Broadway play, The Little Cafe (November 12, 1913 – March 14, 1914), she played several of the characters. In 1917's Broadway musical Have a Heart, she sang two songs. She performed in musical comedies for another decade, ending with Oh, Ernest! (1927), but also appeared in non-musical comedies and dramas. After the Broadway comedy As Good as New in 1930, she set out for Hollywood. During World War II she performed in a USO-sponsored tour of Kiss and Tell in the Azores and Italy.

Marjorie Gateson c.1930.

Gateson made her film debut in 1931, after more than two decades on the stage, playing secondary character roles as women of wealth and breeding, who were often haughty and aloof. She is perhaps best known as the society matron who attempts to thwart Mae West's character's plans for social climbing in the 1935 film Goin' to Town, and as a rather kinder socialite whom Harold Lloyd teaches to box in 1936's The Milky Way.

Other films in which she appeared include The King's Vacation (1933; her largest role, the female lead opposite George Arliss), Bureau of Missing Persons (1933), Private Number (1936), You'll Never Get Rich (1941), International Lady (1941), and Meet The Stewarts (1942). Her film work petered out in the late 1940s, and she jumped into television roles.

She made her small screen debut in 1949. She was featured in the 1949 television soap opera One Man's Family and found success in 1954 at age 63 playing matriarch Grace Harris Tyrell on the daytime soap The Secret Storm, a role she would play until 1968. Gateson also made numerous other television appearances in the 1950s, including episodes of Hallmark Hall of Fame, Robert Montgomery Presents, and United States Steel Hour.

== Personal life and death ==
Gateson never married and said: "I wanted nothing but to be an actress. I didn't even consider trying both."

Gateson suffered a stroke, which ended her acting career, and died on April 17, 1977, of pneumonia, at the age of 86 in a nursing home. in Manhattan.

== Selected filmography ==
- The Beloved Bachelor (1931) - Hortense Cole
- The False Madonna (1931) - Rose
- Working Girls (1931) - Modiste (uncredited)
- Husband's Holiday (1931) - Loretta (scenes deleted)
- Society Girl (1932) - Alice Converse
- Street of Women (1932) - Lois Baldwin
- Okay, America! (1932) - Mrs. Herbert Wright
- Thirteen Women (1932) - Hazel's Travel Companion (uncredited)
- Silver Dollar (1932) - Mrs. Adams (uncredited)
- The King's Vacation (1933) - Helen Everhardt
- Employees' Entrance (1933) - Mrs. Hickox
- Lilly Turner (1933) - Mrs. Bessie 'Ma' McGill
- Cocktail Hour (1933) - Mrs. Pat Lawton
- Melody Cruise (1933) - Mrs. Wells
- Blind Adventure (1933) - Grace Thorne
- Bureau of Missing Persons (1933) - Mrs. Paul
- Walls of Gold (1933) - Cassie Street
- Fog (1933)
- The World Changes (1933) - Mrs. Clinton
- Lady Killer (1933) - Mrs. Wilbur Marley
- Let's Fall in Love (1933) - Agatha
- Hi, Nellie! (1934) - Mrs. Canfield
- Coming Out Party (1934) - Mrs. Ada Stanhope
- Operator 13 (1934) - Mrs. Shackleford
- Side Streets (1934) - Mrs. Thatcher (scenes deleted)
- Down to Their Last Yacht (1934) - Mrs. Geoffrey Colt-Stratton
- Chained (1934) - Mrs. Louise Field
- Million Dollar Ransom (1934) - Elita Casserly
- Big Hearted Herbert (1934) - Amy Goodrich
- Happiness Ahead (1934) - Mrs. Bradford
- Gentlemen Are Born (1934) - Mrs. Harper
- Goin' to Town (1935) - Mrs. Crane Brittony
- His Family Tree (1935) - Margaret 'Maggie' Murfree - aka Murphy
- Your Uncle Dudley (1935) - Mabel Dixon
- The Milky Way (1936) - Mrs. E. Winthrop LeMoyne
- Wife vs. Secretary (1936) - Eve Merritt
- The First Baby (1936) - Mrs. Wells
- Big Brown Eyes (1936) - Mrs. Cole
- Private Number (1936) - Mrs. Winfield
- Anthony Adverse (1936) - Minor Role (uncredited)
- The Gentleman from Louisiana (1936) - Fay Costigan
- Three Married Men (1936) - Clara
- The Man I Marry (1936) - Eloise Hartley
- Arizona Mahoney (1936) - Safroney Jones
- We Have Our Moments (1937) - Mrs. Rutherford
- Turn Off the Moon (1937) - Myrtle Tweep
- Walter Wanger's Vogues of 1938 (1937) - Mrs. George Curtis-Lemke
- First Lady (1937) - Sophy Prescott
- No Time to Marry (1938) - Mrs. Pettensall
- Making the Headlines (1938) - Muffin Wilder
- Gateway (1938) - Mrs. Arabella McNutt
- Stablemates (1938) - Mrs. Shepherd
- Spring Madness (1938) - Miss Ritchie
- The Duke of West Point (1938) - Mrs. Drew
- The Spirit of Culver (1939) - Mrs. Macy, June Mother (uncredited)
- My Wife's Relatives (1939) - Mrs. Ellis
- Too Busy to Work (1939) - Mrs. Randolph Russell
- Geronimo (1939) - Mrs. Steele
- Parole Fixer (1940) - Mrs. Thorton Casserly
- 'Til We Meet Again (1940) - Mrs. Hester
- In Old Missouri (1940) - Mrs. Pittman
- Escape to Glory (1940) - Mrs. Winslow
- Pop Always Pays (1940) - Mrs. Brewster
- Andy Hardy Meets Debutante (1940) - Mrs. Desmond Fowler (uncredited)
- Third Finger, Left Hand (1940) - Mrs. Russell (uncredited)
- I'm Nobody's Sweetheart Now (1940) - Mrs. Morgan
- Back Street (1941) - Mrs. Adams
- Here Comes Happiness (1941) - Emily Vance
- You'll Never Get Rich (1941) - Aunt Louise
- Passage from Hong Kong (1941) - Aunt Julia
- Moonlight in Hawaii (1941) - Aunt Effie Floto
- International Lady (1941) - Bertha Grenner
- Honolulu Lu (1941) - Mrs. Van Derholt
- Obliging Young Lady (1942) - Mira Potter
- Rings on Her Fingers (1942) - Mrs. Fenwick
- Juke Box Jenny (1942) - Mrs. Horton
- Meet the Stewarts (1942) - Mrs. Goodwin
- No Time for Love (1943) - Sophie
- The Youngest Profession (1943) - Mrs. Drew
- Rhythm of the Islands (1943) - Mrs. Holton
- The Sky's the Limit (1943) - Canteen Hostess
- I Dood It (1943) - Mrs. Spelvin
- Casanova in Burlesque (1944) - Lucille Compton
- Hi, Good Lookin'! (1944) - Mrs. Clara Hardacre
- Seven Days Ashore (1944) - Mrs. Elizabeth Arland
- Ever Since Venus (1944) - Maude Hackett
- One More Tomorrow (1946) - Aunt Edna Collier
- The Caddy (1953) - Mrs. Grace Taylor
