= Owen Marks =

British-American film editor (1899–1960)

- Born: August 8, 1899; England, United Kingdom
- Died: 18 September 1960 (aged 61); Los Angeles, California, United States
- Occupation: Film editor
- Years active: 1928–1961

Owen Marks (August 8, 1899 – September 18, 1960) was an English film editor who worked in the US.

Born in England, Marks spent time as a prizefighter before his film career began in 1928, when Warner Bros. contracted him as a film editor. He edited over 95 films during his tenure. He was nominated for the Academy Award for Best Film Editing for Casablanca (1942) and Janie (1944), but did not win either time.

Marks died on September 18, 1960, in Los Angeles, California. His final films as editor, The Sins of Rachel Cade and Parrish, were released posthumously in 1961.

== Partial filmography ==
- The Midnight Taxi (1928)
- Powder My Back (1928)
- Land of the Silver Fox (1928)
- My Man (1928)
- The Hottentot (1929)
- Fancy Baggage (1929)
- Sonny Boy (1929)
- Say It with Songs (1929)
- Disraeli (1929) (uncredited)
- Mammy (1930)
- Sweet Kitty Bellairs (1930)
- Old English (1930)
- Divorce Among Friends (1930)
- Safe in Hell (1931)
- The Millionaire (1931)
- Alexander Hamilton (1931)
- The Hatchet Man (1932)
- Play Girl (1932)
- The Tenderfoot (1932)
- The Crash (1932)
- You Said a Mouthful (1932)
- The Working Man (1933)
- Convention City (1933)
- Voltaire (1933)
- Ever in My Heart (1933)
- Return of the Terror (1934)
- Upper World (1934)
- A Lost Lady (1934)
- The Secret Bride (1934)
- While the Patient Slept (1935)
- Traveling Saleslady (1935)
- The Girl from 10th Avenue (1935)
- We're in the Money (1935)
- Frisco Kid (1935)
- The Petrified Forest (1936)
- I Married a Doctor (1936)
- China Clipper (1936)
- Black Legion (1937)
- Slim (1937)
- It's Love I'm After (1937)
- Secrets of an Actress (1938)
- Love, Honor and Behave (1938)
- Angels with Dirty Faces (1938)
- The Oklahoma Kid (1939)
- Confessions of a Nazi Spy (1939)
- The Private Lives of Elizabeth and Essex (1939)
- The Fighting 69th (1940)
- Saturday's Children (1940)
- No Time for Comedy (1940)
- Footsteps in the Dark (1941)
- Affectionately Yours (1941)
- Blues in the Night (1941)
- Wings for the Eagle (1942)
- Casablanca (1942)
- Mission to Moscow (1943)
- Passage to Marseille (1944)
- Arsenic and Old Lace (1944)
- Janie (1944)
- Pride of the Marines (1945)
- Escape in the Desert (1945)
- The Man I Love (1947)
- Nora Prentiss (1947)
- Deep Valley (1947)
- The Treasure of the Sierra Madre (1948)
- Winter Meeting (1948)
- June Bride (1948)
- Colorado Territory (1949)
- White Heat (1949)
- Caged (1950)
- Bright Leaf (1950)
- The West Point Story (1950)
- Highway 301 (1950)
- Inside the Walls of Folsom Prison (1951)
- Force of Arms (1951)
- I'll See You in My Dreams (1951)
- Stop, You're Killing Me (1952)
- The Man Behind the Gun (1953)
- Trouble Along the Way (1953)
- Three Sailors and a Girl (1953)
- Lucky Me (1954)
- East of Eden (1955)
- The McConnell Story (1955)
- Sincerely Yours (1955)
- Santiago (1956)
- Darby's Rangers (1958)
- Lafayette Escadrille (1958)
- Too Much, Too Soon (1958)
- The Hanging Tree (1959)
- A Summer Place (1959)
- The Sins of Rachel Cade (1961)
- Parrish (1961)
