= Doris Kenyon =

American actress (1897–1979)

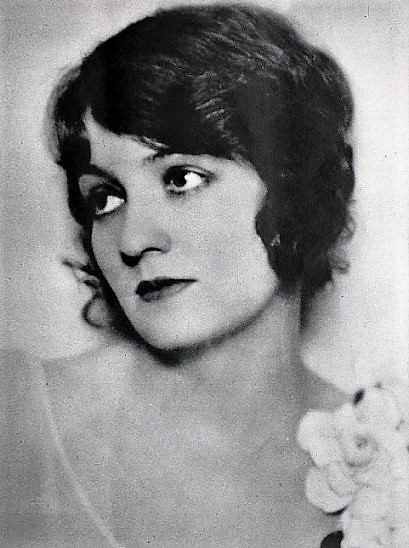
- Kenyon in 1926
- Born: September 5, 1897; Syracuse, New York, U.S.
- Died: September 1, 1979 (aged 81); Beverly Hills, California, U.S.
- Occupation: Actress
- Years active: 1915–1962
- Spouses: Milton Sills (m. 1926; died 1930) Arthur Hopkins (m. 1933; ann. 1934) Albert D. Lasker (m. 1938; div. 1939) Bronislaw Mlynarski (m. 1947; died 1971)
- Children: 1
- Relatives: Raymond T. Kenyon (brother)

Doris Margaret Kenyon (September 5, 1897 – September 1, 1979) was an American actress of film and television.

== Early life ==
She grew up in Syracuse, New York, where her family had a home at 1805 Harrison Street. Her father, James B. Kenyon, was a Methodist Episcopal Church minister at University Church. Kenyon studied at Packer College Institute and later at Columbia University. She sang in the choirs of Grace Presbyterian and Bushwick Methodist Churches in Brooklyn, New York. Her brother was a dentist and New York assemblyman Raymond T. Kenyon.

Her voice attracted the attention of Broadway theatrical scouts who enticed her to become a performer on the stage. In 1915 she first appeared as a chorus girl in the Victor Herbert operetta The Princess Pat.

== Film career ==
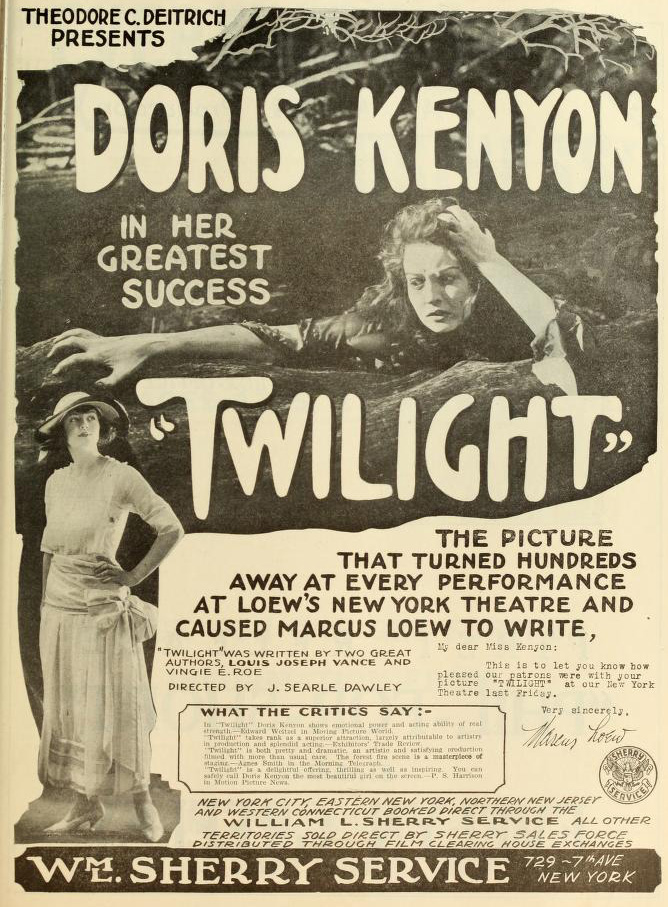
Twilight (1919)

In 1915, she made her first film, The Rack, with World Film Company of Fort Lee, New Jersey. One of the most remembered films of her early career is Monsieur Beaucaire (1924). In this production, she starred opposite Rudolph Valentino. She and her husband, Milton Sills, starred in The Unguarded Hour for First National Pictures (1925). Laura Wood, a star swimmer and wife of Gaylord Wood, First National Pictures cinematographer, doubled for her swimming scenes because she couldn't swim.

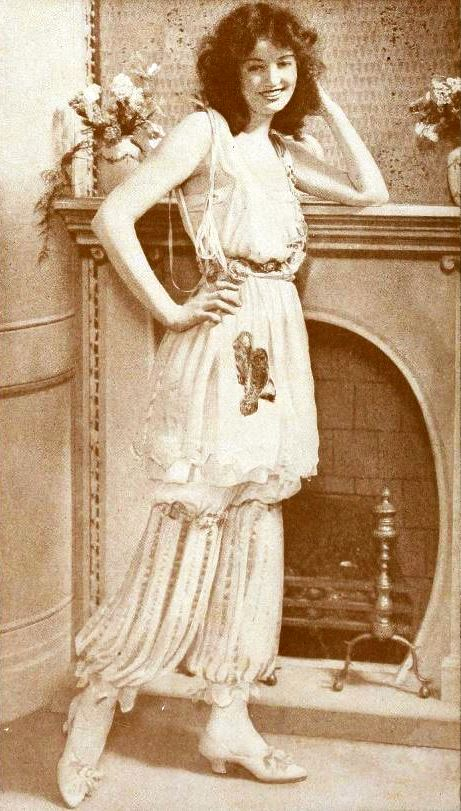
Kenyon in 1920

Kenyon's first sound film was The Home Towners (1928). She also starred in Paramount Pictures' first talking film, Interference (1928).

Kenyon was cast opposite actor George Arliss in two films: Alexander Hamilton (1931) and Voltaire (1933). She participated in Counsellor at Law (1933) with John Barrymore. In the autumn of 1935, Doris appeared with Ramon Novarro in the play A Royal Miscarriage in London.

Kenyon's film career ended with a cameo in The Man in the Iron Mask (1939).

== Music ==
Kenyon's performances as a singer grew out of an evening in New York when a manager of concert artists heard her sing at home for some friends. Afterward, he worked with her to arrange a tour. Singing eventually became an outlet for expressing her feelings after her first husband's death. A soprano, she performed in Detroit as part of the Town Hall Series and in Phoenix as part of the All-Star Artists Series, among others.

Kenyon's concerts featured more than vocal performances. Her "Lyrical Silhouettes" tour in 1933 included "characterizations presented in a half-dozen or more foreign languages and dialects." A variety of costumes supplemented the music in the program's segments.

== Radio ==
Kenyon played Ann Cooper in the soap opera Crossroads on NBC in the 1940s.

== Television ==
Kenyon continued her acting career in television in the 1950s. She was cast in episodes of The Secret Storm (1954), Schlitz Playhouse of Stars and 77 Sunset Strip.

== Marriages ==
Kenyon was married four times.

- Her first husband was the actor Milton Sills. She wed Sills on October 12, 1926. She was widowed in 1930. She had one son with Sills, Kenyon Clarence Sills, born in 1927.
- She married New York real estate broker Arthur Hopkins in 1933. The two divorced the following year, citing incompatibility.
- In 1938 Doris married Albert D. Lasker, owner of Lord & Thomas, an advertising agency. They divorced in 1939.
- Her final marriage was to musician Bronislaw Mlynarski in 1947. He was the son of composer Emil Młynarski and the brother-in-law of Arthur Rubinstein.

== Death ==
Doris Kenyon died on September 1, 1979, at her home in Beverly Hills, California of cardiac arrest.

== In popular culture ==
In 1922, a newborn girl, Doris Kappelhoff, was named after Kenyon. Kappelhoff grew up to be singer and actress Doris Day. Many years later, Day purchased a home in Beverly Hills that was "a few houses away from [Kenyon's], on the very same street."

== Filmography ==
Silent

Year	Title	Role	Notes
1915	The Rack	Effie McKenzie	Lost film
1916	The Pawn of Fate	Marcine Dufrene	Lost film
1916	The Feast of Life	Celida	A copy is held at the Czech Film Archive
1916	The Man Who Stood Still	Marie Krauss	Lost film
1916	The Ocean Waif	Millie Jessop	Short subject
1916	The Traveling Salesman	Beth Elliot	Lost film
1917	The Man Who Forgot	Edith Mallon	Lost film
1917	A Girl's Folly	Mary Baker	
1917	The Empress	Nedra	
1917	Jimmy Dale Alias the Grey Seal	Bit role	Short subject Lost film
1917	On Trial	Bit role	Uncredited; A copy is held at the George Eastman House
1917	The Great White Trail	Prudence Carrington	
1917	Strictly Business		Short subject
1917	The Hidden Hand	Doris Whitney	Pathe Exchange; Lost film Serial
1918	The Street of Seven Stars	Harmony Wells	
1918	The Inn of the Blue Moon	Justine Druce / Dorothy Druce	
1918	Wild Honey	Wild Honey / Mrs. Holbrook	William L. Sherry / Film Clearing House; A copy is held at the Museum of Modern Art
1919	Twilight	Twilight	William L. Sherry / Film Clearing House
1919	The Bandbox	Eleanor Searle	W.W. Hodkinson / Pathe Exchange
1920	The Harvest Moon	Dora Fullerton	W.W. Hodkinson / Pathe Exchange
1921	The Conquest of Canaan	Ariel Taber	Paramount Pictures
1921	Get-Rich-Quick Wallingford	Fannie Jasper	Paramount Pictures; Lost film
1922	Shadows of the Sea	Dorothy Jordan	Selznick Pictures; Lost film
1922	The Ruling Passion	Angie Alden	United Artists; A copy is held at Gosfilmofond
1922	Sure Fire Flint	June De Lanni	Mastodon Film; Lost film
1923	You Are Guilty	Alice Farrell	Mastodon Film
1923	The Last Moment	Alice Winthrop	Goldwyn Pictures; Lost film
1923	Bright Lights of Broadway	Irene Marley	Principal Distributing; A copy is held at the Library of Congress
1924	Restless Wives	Amy Van Clayton	CC Burr; Lost film
1924	The Love Bandit	Polly Benson	Vitagraph
1924	The New School Teacher	Diana Pope	CC Burr
1924	Lend Me Your Husband	Aline Stackton	CC Burr
1924	Monsieur Beaucaire	Lady Mary	Famous Players-Lasky
1924	Born Rich	Frances Melrose	First National; A copy is held at Deutsche Kinemathek
1924	Idle Tongues	Katherine Minot	Ince / First National; Lost film
1925	If I Marry Again	Jocelyn Margot	First National; Lost film
1925	A Thief in Paradise	Helen Saville	First National; Lost film
1925	I Want My Man	Vida	First National; Lost film
1925	The Half-Way Girl	Poppy La Rue	First National; Lost film
1925	The Unguarded Hour	Virginia Gilbert	First National; Lost film
1926	Men of Steel	Mary Berwick	First National; Lost film
1926	Mismates	Judy Winslow	First National; Lost film
1926	Ladies at Play	Ann Harper	First National; Lost film
1926	The Blonde Saint	Ghirlaine Bellamy	First National; Lost film
1927	The Valley of the Giants	Shirley Pennington	First National
1928	Burning Daylight	Virgie	First National
1928	The Hawk's Nest	Madelon Arden	First National; Lost film

Sound

Year	Title	Role	Notes
1928	The Home Towners	Beth Calhoun	Warner Bros. Lost film
1928	Interference	Faith Marlay	Paramount Pictures
1930	Beau Bandit	Helen Wardell	RKO Pictures
1931	The Bargain	Nancy	First National / Warner Bros.
1931	Alexander Hamilton	Betsy Hamilton	Warner Bros.
1931	The Road to Singapore	Philippa Crosby March	Warner Bros.
1931	The Ruling Voice	Mary Stanton	First National / Warner Bros.
1932	Young America	Edith Doray	Fox Film Corporation
1932	The Man Called Back	Diana St. Claire	Tiffany Pictures
1933	Voltaire	Mme. Pompadour	Warner Bros.
1933	No Marriage Ties	Adrienne Deane	RKO Pictures
1933	Counsellor at Law	Cora Simon	Universal Pictures
1934	Whom the Gods Destroy	Margaret Forrester	Columbia Pictures
1934	The Human Side	Vera Sheldon	Universal Pictures
1936	Along Came Love	Mrs. Gould	Paramount Pictures
1938	Girls' School	Mrs. Simpson	Columbia Pictures
1939	The Man in the Iron Mask	Queen Anne	United Artists
