= A Successful Calamity =

1932 film

- Theatrical release poster
- Directed by: John G. Adolfi
- Written by: Adaptation & dialogue: Maude T. Howell; Julien Josephson; Austin Parker
- Based on: A Successful Calamity; 1917 play by Clare Kummer
- Produced by: Lucien Hubbard
- Starring: George Arliss
- Cinematography: James Van Trees
- Edited by: Howard Bretherton
- Music by: Bernhard Kaun
- Production company: Warner Bros. Pictures
- Distributed by: Warner Bros. Pictures
- Release date: September 17, 1932 (US)
- Running time: 72 minutes
- Country: United States
- Language: English

A Successful Calamity is a 1932 American pre-Code comedy film starring George Arliss, supported by Mary Astor and Evalyn Knapp, and directed by John G. Adolfi. Based on the 1917 play A Successful Calamity by Clare Kummer, the film is about an elderly millionaire who must deal with his selfish, young second wife and a pair of spoiled, grown children.

== Plot ==
Henry Wilton is a successful financier who is returning to America after a year away in Europe, where he helped to arrange war debt repayments. He looks forward to being reunited with his family, including his much-younger second wife Emmy, his daughter Peggy and his son Eddie. However, when he arrives in his hometown on the train, the only one there to greet him is his butler, Connors, much to Henry's dismay. The butler informs him that he is home a day earlier than expected, and that Peggy is an aspiring actress and Eddie is a polo player. They visit Eddie at the polo field, then arrive home, where they find that Emmy is having guests over at a music recital by composer Pietro Rafaelo. Henry further finds that in his absence Emmy has redecorated his bedroom in the Art Nouveau style, and removed his comfortable chair, which Connors has taken for safekeeping. While in Connors' room, Henry is visited by George Struthers, Peggy's fortune-hunting fiancé who she plans to marry for his money. Henry tries to buy a stock from Partington, his business rival, who refuses to honour an agreement they had to sell it at a certain price, claiming that the agreement is not in writing.

Meanwhile, the Wilton family is rarely spending much time together, and Henry becomes tired of his family's hectic social schedule. When Connors tells him that the poor can't go out too often, Henry decides to feign poverty to test his family's mettle. Accordingly, Henry tells his wife and children that he is ruined, and they rally to his side. They decide to give up their plans and stay home for dinner, leading to a frantic effort by the servants to come up with food. Furthermore, Emmy regrets her extravagance, Peggy gives up her engagement to George for Larry Rivers, who she is really in love with, and Eddie decides to get a job as a pilot, and goes to Partington for a letter of introduction. Partington is delighted to hear that Henry is ruined, and assumes that the stock he holds will lose its value and wants to get rid of it as soon as possible. Henry then buys Partington's stock by acting through a third party, at a price lower than that they had agreed upon, and that Partington had paid for it in the first place. Meanwhile, Emmy says she is going out for a walk, and goes off in a car with Pietro. Avenged of his rival, Henry comes home and tells his children that he is not ruined after all, but they tell him that Emmy has gone out and seems to have deserted him. However, Emmy comes back and tells them that she had gone out to pawn her jewelry in order to help him, and that she was happiest when they were poor and could not go out, and thus able to spend time as a family.

== Cast ==
- George Arliss as Henry Wilton
- Mary Astor as Emmy "Sweetie" Wilton
- Evalyn Knapp as Peggy Wilton
- Grant Mitchell as Connors
- Hardie Albright as George Struthers
- William Janney as Eddie Wilton
- David Torrence as Partington
- Randolph Scott as Larry Rivers
- Hale Hamilton as John Belden
- Fortunio Bonanova as Pietro Rafaelo
- Oscar Apfel as President
- Murray Kinnell as Alfred Curtis
- Harold Minjir as valet
- Barbara Leonard as Pauline
- Eula Guy as Jane
- Leon Ames as Barney Davis
- Virginia Hammond as Mrs. Langstreet
- Richard Tucker as Lawrence
- Charles Coleman as Butler
- Jack Rutherford as Chauffeur
- Nola Luxford as Mary
