= Lucien Hubbard =

American film producer

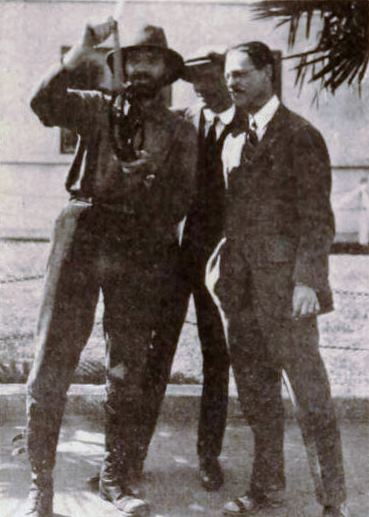
- Director B. Reeves Eason showing screenwriters Lucien Hubbard and Douglas Z. Doty film from a western, 1920
- Born: December 22, 1888; Fort Thomas, Kentucky, US
- Died: December 31, 1971 (aged 83); Los Angeles, California, U.S.
- Occupations: Screenwriter, film producer
- Years active: 1917–1943
- Children: 2
- Family: Harlan Hubbard (brother)
- Awards: Best Picture; 1927 Wings

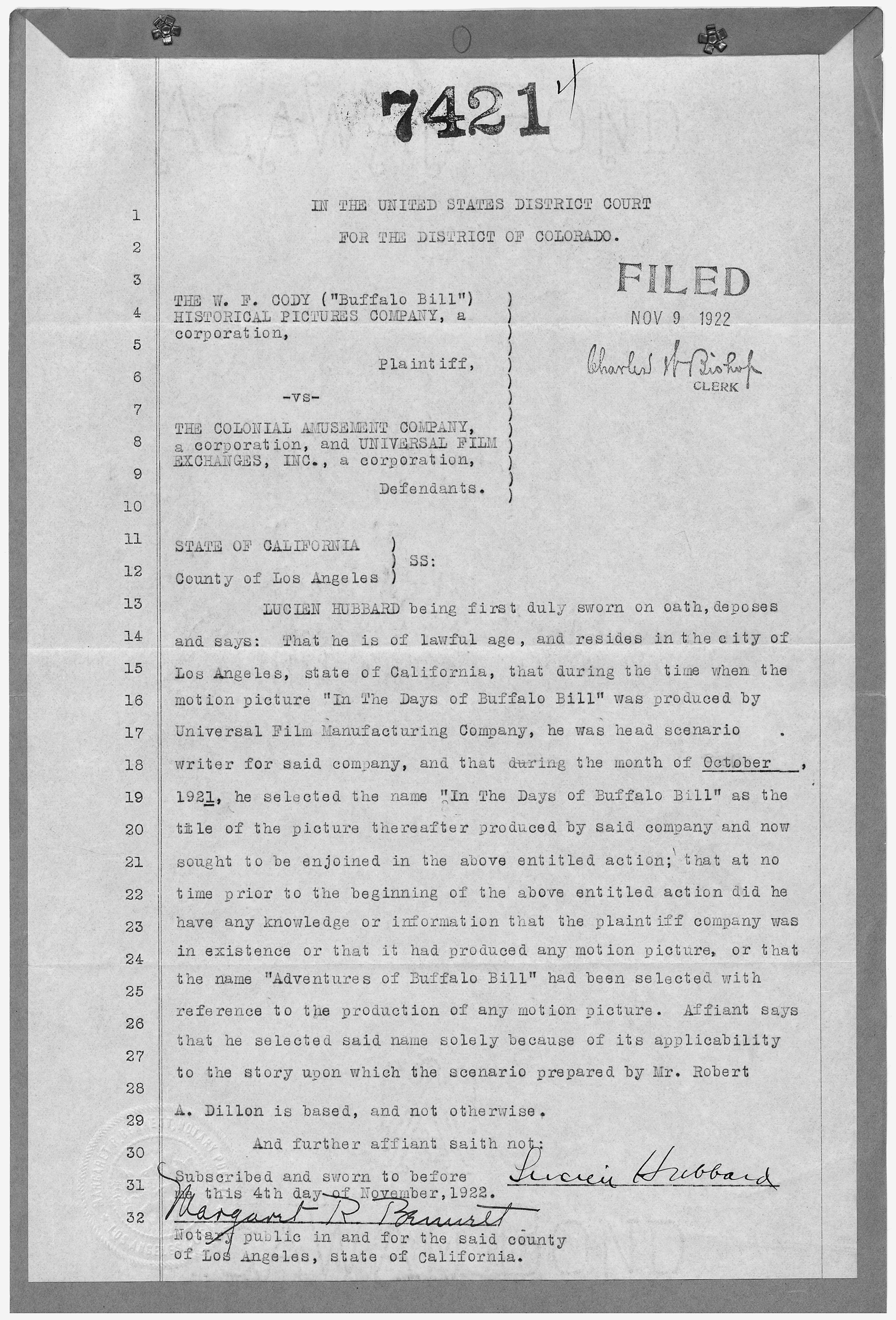
Affidavit of Lucien Hubbard, 1922, saying that he created the title for the film In the Days of Buffalo Bill.

Lucien Hubbard (December 22, 1888 – December 31, 1971) was an American film producer and screenwriter.

== Biography ==
Hubbard is best known for producing the 1927 film Wings, for which he received the first Academy Award for Best Picture. Lucien produced and or wrote ninety-two films over the course of his career. He lived in the same house in Beverly Hills until the day he died; he was an avid polo player and would frequently ride out of the stables located, in those days, at the rear of his Hillcrest Road property, to Will Rogers' house in the Palisades; he also occasionally rode his horse to Paramount Studios where he had been elevated to president shortly after the Academy Award-winning Wings which he produced, was released. This film helped director William A. Wellman's rise into major studio films.

Before coming to Los Angeles, he was night editor of The New York Times. He had written five screenplays on the side and decided one day to travel to Hollywood to see if he could sell any of them; he sold three and in 1923, his career was launched. A film he loved and the adaptation for, The Vanishing American (1925), was the first film to portray the Indian in a favorable light; he received an award from the Cherokee nation for this it. He discovered and mentored many talents over the life of his career and was known as a very generous man with a sharp eye for good writers. He had two daughters, Betty and Janet and a brother, Harlan Hubbard, who became a renowned artist and writer, who advocated simple living.

== Partial filmography ==
- The Angel Factory (1917) (writer)
- The Awakening of Ruth (1917) (writer)
- The Beloved Blackmailer (1918) (writer)
- Terror of the Range (1919) (writer)
- The Black Gate (1919) (writer)
- The Climbers (1919) (writer)
- The Tower of Jewels (1919) (writer)
- The Sporting Duchess (1920) (writer)
- Outside the Law (1920) (writer)
- The Garter Girl (1920) (writer)
- Captain Swift (1920) (writer)
- A Master Stroke (1920) (writer)
- Cheated Love (1921) (writer)
- The Magnificent Brute (1921) (writer)
- The Fox (1921) (writer)
- The Rage of Paris (1921)
- The Blazing Trail (1921)
- The Trap (1922) (writer)
- West of the Water Tower (1923) (writer)
- Daughters of Today (1924) (writer)
- Wanderer of the Wasteland (1924) (supervising producer)
- The Thundering Herd (1925) (writer)
- Code of the West (1925) (writer)
- The Light of Western Stars (1925) (writer)
- Wild Horse Mesa (1925) (writer)
- The Vanishing American (1925) (writer)
- Born to the West (1926) (writer)
- Wings (1927) (producer)
- Rose-Marie (1928) (director)
- The Mysterious Island (1929) (director, writer)
- Paid (1930) (writer)
- Isle of Escape (1930) (writer)
- The Maltese Falcon (1931) (writer)
- Smart Money (1931) (writer)
- The Squaw Man (1931) (writer)
- The Star Witness (1931) (writer)
- Stranger in Town (1931) (producer)
- Three on a Match (1932) (writer)
- A Successful Calamity (1932) (assoc. producer)
- So Big (1932) (assoc. producer)
- The Mouthpiece (1932) (assoc. producer)
- Weekend Marriage (1932) (assoc. producer)
- Storm at Daybreak (1932) (producer)
- The Women in His Life (1933) (producer)
- Operator 13 (1933) (producer)
- Made on Broadway (1933) (producer)
- Fugitive Lovers (1933) (producer)
- The Stranger's Return (1933) (producer)
- Beauty for Sale (1933) (producer)
- Employees' Entrance (1933) (producer)
- The Working Man (1933) (assoc. producer)
- Midnight Mary (1933) (producer)
- Ex-Lady (1933) (assoc. producer)
- The King's Vacation (1933) (assoc. producer)
- Lazy River (1934) (producer and writer)
- Murder in the Private Car (1934) (producer)
- The Show-Off (1934) (producer)
- Paris Interlude (1934) (producer)
- Society Doctor (1934) (producer)
- Death on the Diamond (1934) (producer)
- Straight Is the Way (1934) (producer)
- You Can't Buy Everything (1934) (producer)
- Exclusive Story (1935) (producer)
- Times Square Lady (1935) (producer)
- Pursuit (1935) (producer)
- Calm Yourself (1935) (producer)
- Public Hero No. 1 (1935) (producer)
- The Casino Murder Case (1935) (producer)
- Shadow of Doubt (1935) (producer)
- Sworn Enemy (1935) (producer)
- Murder in the Fleet (1935) (producer)
- Here Comes the Band (1935) (producer)
- Kind Lady (1935) (producer)
- The Longest Night (1936) (producer)
- Moonlight Murder (1936) (producer)
- Speed (1936) (producer)
- All American Chump (1936) (producer)
- Sinner Take All (1936) (producer)
- Under Cover of Night (1936) (producer)
- Women Are Trouble (1936) (producer)
- The Garden Murder Case (1936) (producer)
- A Family Affair (1937) (producer)
- Man of the People (1937) (producer)
- Song of the City (1937) (producer)
- Nick Carter, Master Detective (1939) (producer)
- 6,000 Enemies (1939) (producer)
- The Man Who Dared (1939) (writer)
- Gung Ho! (1943) (writer)
