= Voltaire (film) =

1933 American biographical film

- Theatrical release poster
- Directed by: John G. Adolfi
- Written by: George Gibbs (novel); E. Lawrence Dudley (novel); Paul Green; Maude T. Howell
- Produced by: Raymond Griffith
- Starring: George Arliss; Doris Kenyon; Margaret Lindsay; Alan Mowbray; Reginald Owen
- Cinematography: Tony Gaudio
- Edited by: Owen Marks
- Music by: Bernhard Kaun; Milan Roder (uncredited)
- Production company: Warner Bros. Pictures
- Distributed by: Warner Bros. Pictures
- Release date: August 5, 1933
- Running time: 72 minutes
- Country: United States
- Language: English
- Budget: $310,000
- Box office: $765,000

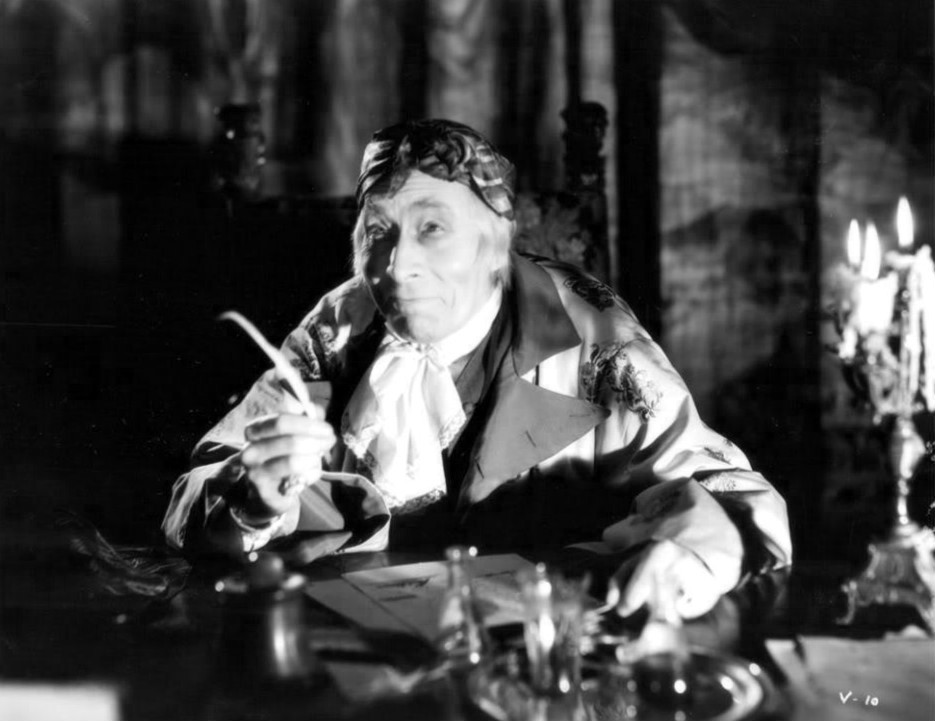
George Arliss in Voltaire (1933)

Voltaire is a 1933 American pre-Code biographical film directed by John G. Adolfi and starring George Arliss as Voltaire, an 18th-century French writer and philosopher. It is the last of Arliss' films produced by Warner Bros and the last of his seven collaborations with Adolfi.

== Plot ==
In pre-Revolutionary France, Voltaire champions the oppressed commoners and tries to warn King Louis XV about the growing unrest among his subjects. The writer has a powerful ally in Madame Pompadour, Louis' mistress, but the Count de Sarnac opposes him for his own ends.

When Voltaire pleads for the life of Calas, unjustly accused of treason, Louis is inclined to pardon the man, but Sarnac persuades him that it would be a sign of weakness, and Calas is swiftly executed. As a reward, Sarnac gains the wealthy man's estates. Voltaire invites Calas' daughter and rightful heiress, Nanette, to shelter in his home.

Meanwhile, Sarnac tries to persuade the King that Voltaire is a traitor, citing his well-known friendship with Frederick the Great and claiming that it is he who is betraying French secrets to the Prussian ruler. Louis is not entirely convinced, but does banish Voltaire from his royal court at Versailles.

As a result, Madame Pompadour becomes reluctant to aid Voltaire further, until he arranges it so that she can overhear from Sarnac's own lips his ambition to replace her as Louis' paramount adviser. Then, she persuades the King to allow Voltaire to stage a new play at Versailles.

The production is a thinly disguised portrayal of Calas' execution and the aftermath transposed to an exotic setting. Voltaire hopes to open the King's eyes to his danger. Voltaire recruits Nanette to portray the part of herself. The King is sympathetic to the theatrical Nanette's plight, not recognizing himself as her despised oppressor until Sarnac points it out. Then Louis orders the play stopped before the explanatory final scene and orders that Voltaire be sent to the Bastille. However, hearing of a rich present given to Sarnac by Frederick, Voltaire unmasks the count as the real traitor. Sarnac is arrested, and Nanette's estates are restored to her.

The film ends by showing peasants revolting, with the words "Justice", "Tolerance", and "Liberty" on the screen, then showing Voltaire with an overlay of a flag blowing in the wind.

== Cast ==
- George Arliss as Voltaire
- Doris Kenyon as Madame de Pompadour
- Margaret Lindsay as Nanette Calas
- Reginald Owen as King Louis XV
- Theodore Newton as Francois, a friend of Nanette
- Alan Mowbray as the Count de Sarnac
- Gordon Westcott as the Captain
- Murray Kinnell as Emile
- Doris Lloyd as Madame Clarion
- Douglass Dumbrille as Oriental King in Play
- David Torrence as Dr. Tronchin, Voltaire's doctor
- Heinie Conklin as Protester (uncredited)

== Box office ==
According to Warner Bros the film earned $393,000 domestically and $372,000 foreign.

== Preservation status ==
- The film is preserved in the Library of Congress collection. Though it has yet to be released on DVD, it does air occasionally on Turner Classic Movies.
