= Gordon Westcott =

American actor

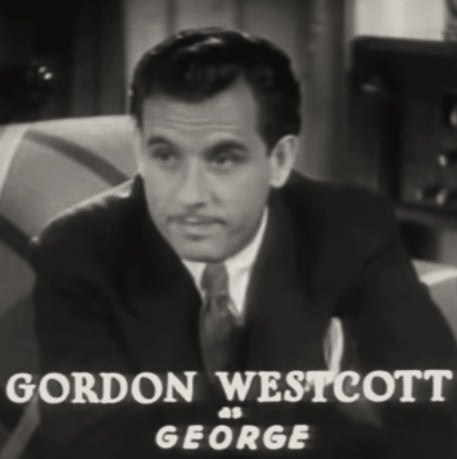
- From Murder in the Clouds (1934)
- Born: Myrthus Hansen Hickman; November 6, 1903; St. George, Utah, U.S.
- Died: October 30, 1935 (aged 31); Hollywood, California, U.S.
- Education: University of Chicago
- Occupation: Actor
- Years active: 1927–1935
- Spouse: Margaret Cardon (divorced)
- Children: 2

Gordon Westcott (born Myrthus Hansen Hickman; November 6, 1903 – October 30, 1935) was an American film actor.

== Biography ==
Westcott studied architecture at the University of Chicago, where he was also lightweight boxing champion of the university. Westcott was a member of the Church of Jesus Christ of Latter-day Saints.

Westcott acted on stage in New York, Utah, and California, before he made the move to film. He became a contract player with Warner Brothers and appeared in 37 films between 1928 and 1935, starring alongside such up and comers as Bette Davis, Loretta Young and James Cagney.

After appearing in a string of Pre-Code productions, and working with such directors as William A. Wellman, Busby Berkeley and William Dieterle, his film career ended with his death on October 30, 1935, one week before his 32nd birthday, from a skull fracture sustained in a polo accident that had occurred three days earlier.

== Filmography ==
Year	Title	Role	Notes
1928	Our Dancing Daughters	Diana's Party Friend	Uncredited
1929	Queen Kelly	Lackey	(unbilled), Uncredited
1931	Enemies of the Law	Blackie	
1932	Merrily We Go to Hell	Party Boy	Uncredited
1932	Guilty as Hell	Dr. Goodman	Uncredited
1932	Devil and the Deep	Lt. Toll	
1932	Love Me Tonight	Credit Manager of the Association of Retail Merchants	Uncredited
1932	Heritage of the Desert	Snap Naab	
1933	The Crime of the Century	Gilbert Reid	
1933	He Learned About Women	Eddie Clifford	
1933	The Working Man	Fred Pettison	
1933	Lilly Turner	Rex Durkee	
1933	Private Detective 62	Bandor	
1933	Heroes for Sale	Roger	
1933	Voltaire	The Captain	
1933	Footlight Parade	Harry Thompson	
1933	The World Changes	John Nordholm	
1933	Convention City	Phil Lorraine / Frank Wilson	
1934	Dark Hazard	Joe	
1934	I've Got Your Number	Nicky	
1934	Fashions of 1934	Harry Brent	
1934	Registered Nurse	Jim Benton	
1934	Fog Over Frisco	Joe Bello	
1934	The Circus Clown	Frank	
1934	Call It Luck	'Lucky' Luke Bartlett	
1934	Kansas City Princess	Jimmy the Dude aka Frankie Smith	
1934	The Case of the Howling Dog	Arthur Cartwright	
1934	6 Day Bike Rider	Harry St. Clair	
1934	Murder in the Clouds	George Wexley	
1935	The White Cockatoo	Dr. Roberts	
1935	A Night at the Ritz	Joe Scurvin	
1935	Go into Your Dance	Fred	
1935	Going Highbrow	Sam Long	
1935	Front Page Woman	Maitland Coulter	
1935	Bright Lights	Wellington	
1935	Two-Fisted	George Parker	
1935	This Is the Life	Ed Revier	(final film role)
