= Disraeli (1929 film) =

1929 American film by Alfred E Green

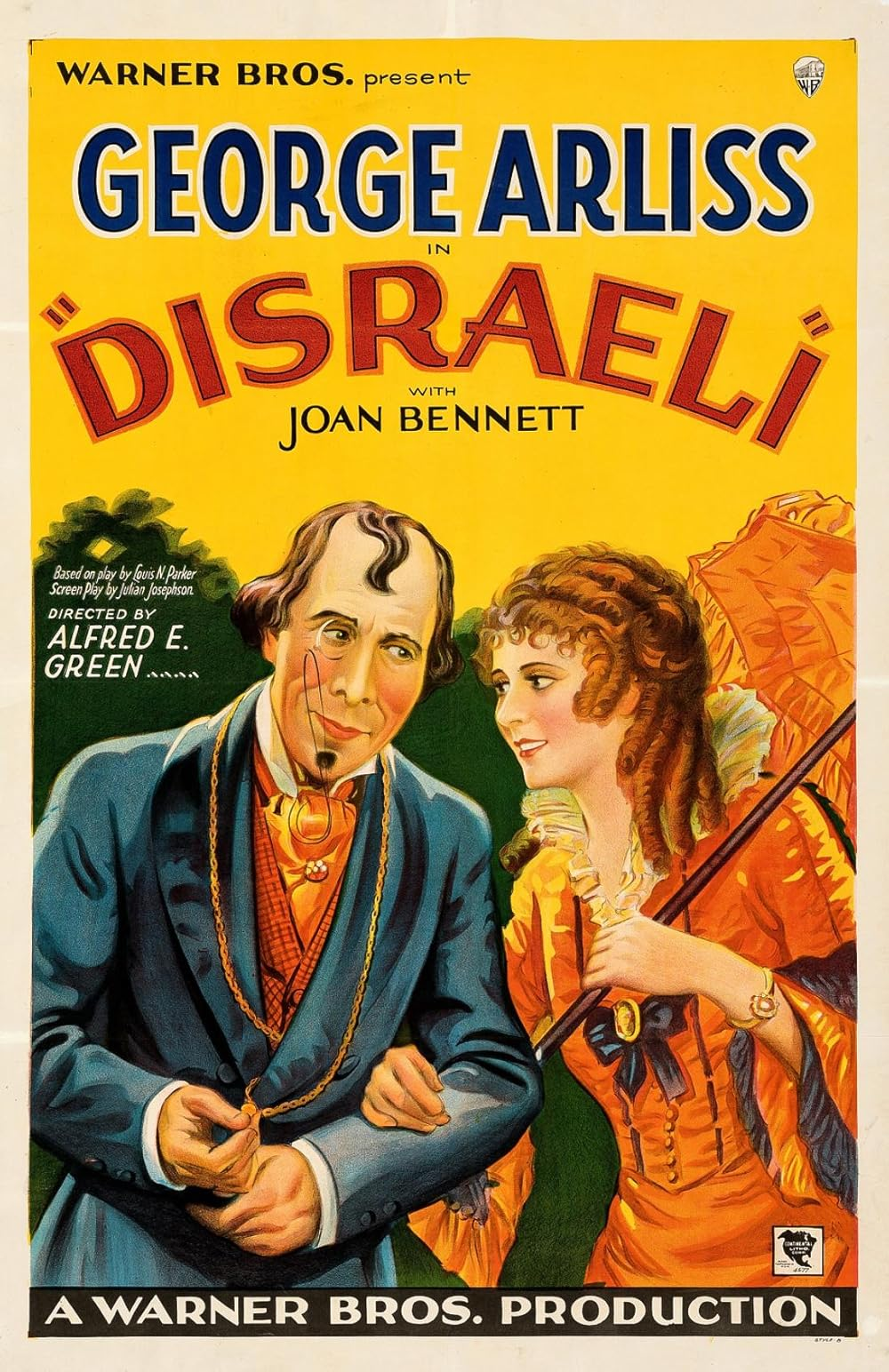
- Theatrical release poster
- Directed by: Alfred E. Green
- Screenplay by: Julien Josephson
- Based on: Disraeli; 1911 play by Louis N. Parker
- Produced by: Jack L. Warner; Darryl F. Zanuck
- Starring: George Arliss; Doris Lloyd; David Torrence; Joan Bennett
- Cinematography: Lee Garmes
- Edited by: Owen Marks (uncredited)
- Music by: Louis Silvers
- Production company: Warner Bros. Pictures
- Distributed by: Warner Bros. Pictures
- Release dates: November 1, 1929 (original release); 1934 (re-release)
- Running time: 90 minutes (1929 release); 87 minutes (1934 re-release)
- Country: United States
- Language: English
- Budget: $318,000
- Box office: $1,498,000

Disraeli is a 1929 American sound (All-Talking) pre-Code historical film directed by Alfred E. Green, released by Warner Bros. Pictures, and adapted by Julien Josephson (screenplay) and De Leon Anthony (titles) from the 1911 play Disraeli by Louis N. Parker.

The lobby card states, "Mr. George Arliss in his greatest picture Disraeli". His performance as British prime minister Benjamin Disraeli won him the Academy Award for Best Actor in a Leading Role. The story revolves around the British plan to buy the Suez Canal and the efforts of two spies to stop it.

As with the original 1911 Broadway play and its 1917 revival, and the 1921 silent film, Arliss' wife Florence appeared opposite him in the role of Disraeli's wife, Mary Anne (Lady Beaconsfield).

== Plot ==
A near-complete 1934 version of the film. Nearly three minutes of pre-Code footage was deleted and presumably lost.

In 1874, Disraeli's ambitious foreign policy, aimed at extending the British empire, is voted down by the House of Commons after a speech by his great rival, William Gladstone. Later, Disraeli receives the welcome news that the spendthrift Khedive of Egypt is in dire need of money and is willing to sell the controlling shares in the Suez Canal. The purchase of the canal would secure control of India, but Michael Probert, head of the Bank of England, makes it clear to Disraeli that he is vehemently opposed to any such plan. Disraeli then summons Hugh Myers, a leading Jewish banker.

Meanwhile, Lord Charles Deeford proposes to Lady Clarissa Pevensey. Although she is in love with him, she turns him down. He is content to enjoy his wealth and high social standing, and lacks the ambition she wants in a husband; further, she is a great admirer of the Prime Minister and Charles has no strong opinion about him. Disraeli, seeing promise in the young man and wanting Clarissa to be happy, convinces Charles to come work for him, and tells him about the canal purchase but he does not tell him about the spies.

Russia, eager to seize India for itself, has assigned two spies to watch Disraeli: Mrs. Travers, who has entree to the highest social circles, and Mr. Foljambe. Disraeli was not fooled; he has hired Foljambe as his personal government secretary, the better to deceive him. When Foljambe asks Charles if Myers is there to provide financial backing for the purchase of the canal, Charles says nothing, but his manner makes it clear that Foljambe has guessed correctly. Mrs. Travers orders Foljambe to leave the country and warn their masters.

Disraeli soon discovers what has happened. When he decides to send an agent to the Khedive immediately, Clarissa suggests he send Charles. Charles persuades the Khedive to accept Myers' cheque in exchange for the shares, also proving his own worth to Clarissa.

Disraeli is elated when he receives the news. However, Myers comes and informs him that his banking house has been driven into bankruptcy by sabotage; the cheque is worthless. Disraeli tells him to keep his situation secret for the moment. When the prying Mrs. Travers arrives, Disraeli allows her to learn of the purchase, and she exultantly admits to her key part in sabotaging Myers.

Thinking quickly, Disraeli summons Probert. Though the banker initially refuses to help, Disraeli forces him to sign a paper giving unlimited credit to Myers by threatening to have Parliament revoke the bank's charter. (After Probert leaves, Disraeli confesses to his wife and Clarissa that he was bluffing.) Myers' solvency is restored, the deal is completed, and as a result of Disraeli's success, Queen Victoria can add Empress of India to her other titles. Disraeli is honored when he and his wife, who has recovered from serious illness, attend a reception for the Queen.

== Cast ==
- George Arliss as Disraeli
- Doris Lloyd as Mrs. Travers
- David Torrence as Lord Probert
- Joan Bennett as Lady Clarissa Pevensey
- Florence Arliss as Lady Beaconsfield
- Anthony Bushell as Charles, Lord Deeford
- Michael Visocoff, S.T. as Count Borsinov
- Ivan Simpson as Hugh Meyers
- Gwendolyn Logan as Duchess of Glastonbury
- Cosmo Kyrle Bellew as Mr. Terle

== Production ==
The Green Goddess was filmed in 1929 and completed before Disraeli, but was held out of release until 1930 at the request of Arliss because he felt this film was a better vehicle for his talkie debut. Silent film versions of Parker's play, both also titled "Disraeli", had previously been produced: A 1916 version produced by British company NB Films; and the 1921 version produced by Arliss' production company, Distinctive Productions, and released by United Artists.

== Box office ==
According to Warner Bros records the film earned $924,000 domestically and $574,000 foreign.

== Reception ==
The film received three Academy Awards nominations. George Arliss' win for Best Actor made him the first British actor to win, the first actor to win for a remake of a previously produced movie, and the first to win for reprising a movie role. The film was also nominated for Outstanding Production, but lost to All Quiet on the Western Front. Screenwriter Julien Josephson was nominated for Best Writing Achievement in a year when only one award was given for screenwriting. (In most years, he would have been nominated for Best Adapted Screenplay.) He lost to Frances Marion for The Big House. The film was also awarded the Photoplay Magazine Medal of Honor in 1929.

The New Zealand Herald praised the film, saying it "raises a set standard" and especially praising Arliss, who "is the whole picture." In a retrospective review, Richard Gilliam praised the film for Arliss's performance in a "compelling portrait," though criticizing its sound and set design.

== Preservation status ==
The film survives in its 1934 re-release form, when it was converted from its original sound-on-disc technology to sound-on-film. To provide space for the soundtrack, the image was noticeably cropped on the left side, except for the opening credit sequence and end title, which were replaced and are centered. Some pre-Code footage, about three minutes, was also deleted and is believed to be lost.

== See also ==
- List of early sound feature films (1926–1929)
