= Florence Arliss =

English actress

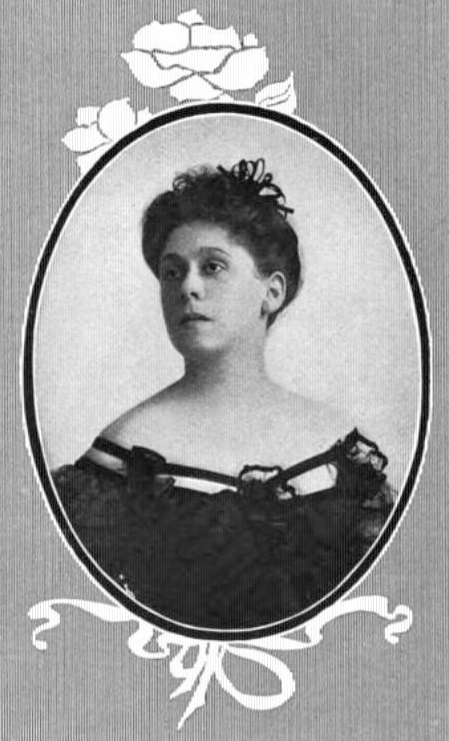
- Born: Florence Kate Montgomery; 29 July 1870; London, England
- Died: 12 March 1950 (aged 79); Paddington, London, England
- Occupation: Actress
- Years active: 1921–1934
- Spouse: George Arliss (m. 1899; died 1946)

Florence Kate Arliss (née Montgomery; 29 July 1870 – 12 March 1950) was an English actress. She was married to George Arliss with whom she often costarred. She played his wife in films like Disraeli, The Millionaire, and The House of Rothschild.

On 12 March 1950, Arliss died in her home in London.

== Filmography ==
Year	Title	Role	Notes
1921	The Devil	Marie's Aunt	
1921	Disraeli	Lady Beaconsfield	
1929	Disraeli	Lady Beaconsfield	
1931	The Millionaire	Mrs. Laura Alden	
1933	The King's Vacation	Queen Margaret	
1934	The House of Rothschild	Hannah Rothschild	(final film role)
