= Harlan Hubbard =

American painter

- Born: January 4, 1900; Bellevue, Kentucky, U.S.
- Died: January 16, 1988 (aged 88)
- Education: Evander Childs Educational Campus; National Academy of Design; Art Academy of Cincinnati
- Known for: Painting
- Spouse: Anna Eikenhout (m. 1943–1986)
- Family: Lucien Hubbard (brother)

Harlan Hubbard (January 4, 1900 – January 16, 1988) was an American artist and writer, known for his simple lifestyle.

== Early life and education ==
Hubbard was born in Bellevue, Kentucky. His father died when Harlan was only seven. Soon thereafter, his mother moved him to New York City to be with his two older brothers who were living there at the time. One of his brothers, Lucien Hubbard (1888–1971), became a Hollywood screenwriter. Hubbard attended Childs High School in the Bronx and received his art education from New York's National Academy of Design and the Art Academy of Cincinnati. In 1919, he returned with his mother to northern Kentucky and settled in Fort Thomas, Kentucky.

== Simple living at Payne Hollow ==
As a young man, Hubbard saw the industrial development in America as a threat to the natural world and he came to reject consumer culture. In 1929 he started keeping a journal into which he poured his thoughts on society. In 1943, he married Anna Eikenhout. The following year they built a shantyboat at Brent, Kentucky and traveled down the Ohio and Mississippi rivers, ending their journey in the Louisiana bayous in 1951. His book Shantyboat recounts the eight-year journey from Brent to New Orleans. His book Shantyboat in the Bayous, which was published in 1990, completes the story.

In 1951, Harlan and Anna built a simple home at Payne Hollow on the shore of the Ohio River in Trimble County, Kentucky. It was there that the Hubbards lived lives that have been described as simultaneously frugal and abundant. Hubbard published two books on their lifestyle: Payne Hollow and Journals, 1929-1944. Author Wendell Berry was a close friend of Hubbard's who wrote and lectured on the Hubbards' lives.

Hubbard's wife Anna died on May 4, 1986. Hubbard himself died two years later at the age of 88.

== Artistic legacy ==
Hubbard's art was largely pastoral, including oils, watercolors, and woodblock printing. The Behringer-Crawford Museum in Covington, Kentucky and the Frankfort Community Public Library (Frankfort, Indiana) have significant collections of his work.

Hubbard bequeathed Payne Hollow to his friend and fellow artist Paul Hassfurder. Hassfurder began living in Payne Hollow in 1989.

== Works ==
- Shantyboat (New York: Dodd, Mead), 1953. [republished as Shantyboat: A River Way of Life (Lexington, KY: University Press of Kentucky), 1977. ISBN 0-8131-1359-8]
- Payne Hollow: Life on the Fringe of Society (New York: Eakins Press), 1974. ISBN 0-87130-040-0 [republished as a "new edition" in 1997 by Gnomon Press, ISBN 0-917788-66-4]
- "Payne Hollow" in Kentucky Renaissance: An Anthology of Contemporary Writing, Jonathan Greene, ed. (Lexington, KY: Gnomon Press), 1976.
- Harlan Hubbard Journals, 1929-1944 (Lexington, KY: University Press of Kentucky), 1987. ISBN 0-8131-1616-3
- Oyo: An Ohio River Anthology (with Don Wallis) (Yellow Springs, OH: Oyo Press), 1987.
- Shantyboat on the Bayous (Lexington, KY: University Press of Kentucky), 1990. ISBN 0-8131-1717-8
- Shantyboat Journal (Lexington, KY: University Press of Kentucky), 1994. ISBN 0-8131-1868-9
- The Woodcuts of Harlan Hubbard: From the Collection of Bill Caddell (Lexington, KY: University Press of Kentucky), 1994. ISBN 0-8131-1879-4
- Payne Hollow Journal (Lexington, KY: University Press of Kentucky), 1996. ISBN 0-8131-1954-5
- A Visit with Harlan Hubbard (with Wade H. Hall) (Lexington, KY: University of Kentucky Libraries), 1996. ISBN 0-917519-04-3
- Sonata at Payne Hollow: A Play (by Wendell Berry) (Monterey, KY: Larkspur Press), 2001.
