= The Devil (Molnár play) =

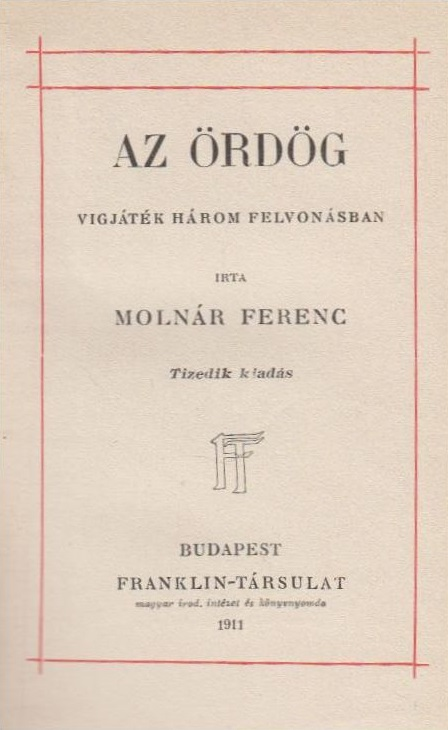
The 10th edition

The Devil (Hungarian: Az ördög) is a Hungarian play by Ferenc Molnár, first produced in 1907. It was adapted into the German language as Der Teufel, and performed in New York City under this title at the New German Theater in 1908 with Eugen Burg in the title role. It was adapted in 1918 for a Hungarian film directed by Michael Curtiz. James Young directed an English-language version, The Devil (1921), in which George Arliss reprised his Broadway stage success.
