= The Home Towners =

1928 film by Bryan Foy

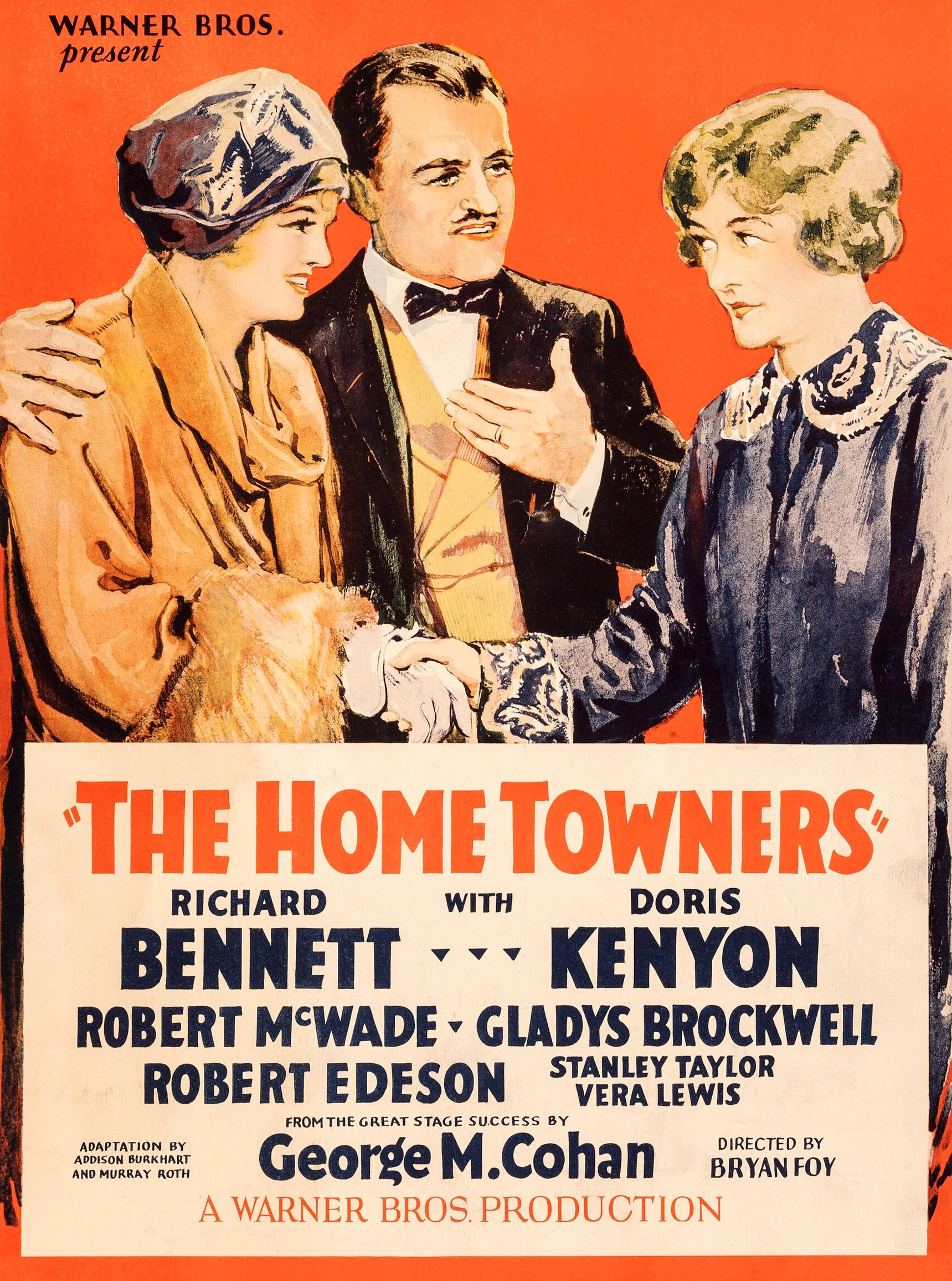
- Theatrical release poster
- Directed by: Bryan Foy
- Written by: Addison Burkhard; Murray Roth
- Based on: The Home Towners (play) by George M. Cohan
- Starring: Richard Bennett; Doris Kenyon; Robert McWade
- Cinematography: Barney McGill; Willard Van Enger
- Production company: Warner Bros. Pictures
- Distributed by: Warner Bros. Pictures
- Release date: November 3, 1928
- Running time: 11 reels (sound version)
- Country: United States
- Language: English

The Home Towners is a 1928 American comedy film directed by Bryan Foy and starring Richard Bennett, Doris Kenyon, and Robert McWade. This film was the third all-talking feature film produced by Warner Bros. Pictures to be released.

== Plot ==
Vic Arnold, a wealthy bachelor living in New York City, is engaged to marry the beautiful Beth Calhoun. To celebrate the upcoming wedding, he invites his old boyhood friend from South Bend, P. H. Bancroft, to be his best man. Bancroft arrives with his strong-willed wife, Lottie, and immediately begins to scrutinize Vic's choice of fiancée and her family.

When Bancroft learns that Beth's father, Mr. Calhoun, was once a bartender but is now an inventor supported by Vic's $200,000 investment in a bottle washer, and that her brother Wally Calhoun earns $15,000 a year at Vic's brokerage firm, he grows suspicious. Convinced the Calhouns are exploiting Vic, Bancroft launches a one-man campaign to save his friend from what he perceives as a social and financial disaster.

Later, Wally and his friend Joe Roberts drop by. Bancroft finds Wally brash and cocky. After they leave, Ban tries to convince Vic that he's marrying into a family of “bandits and highwaymen.” Their disagreement escalates until Vic slaps Ban in the face. Though Vic later tries to apologize, Ban storms off to his hotel.

Vic eventually visits Ban at the hotel, where Lottie agrees to speak with him alone. Vic brings Beth to meet her, and Lottie politely claims that her husband is too ill to meet the bride-to-be. Then, the Calhouns arrive—including Beth's father Mr. Calhoun, her mother Mrs. Calhoun, and Wally. When Mr. Calhoun hears of Ban's illness, he tries to help by offering a bit of osteopathic treatment. The proud Bancroft explodes in outrage, accusing the entire Calhoun family of being thieves and swindlers, and storms out yet again.

Vic follows him, and the two men resume their argument. Vic calls Ban the most stubborn man alive. This time, Ban slaps Vic—reversing the insult of the previous night. Vic laughs and declares that now they're even, and the two shake hands, friends once more.

However, things remain tense. Beth, furious that Bancroft insulted her family, tells Vic that she won't marry him if Ban is his best man. Later, Vic apologizes for his friend's behavior, but Beth is still upset and breaks off the engagement, returning his ring.

A few days later, Wally arrives at Vic's apartment to deliver a package from Beth. He runs into Vic, Ban, and Lottie returning from the theatre. On his way out, Wally delivers a sharp parting shot to Ban, telling him he owns “the two most dangerous weapons in the world—a Main Street mind and a poisonous tongue.” Ban remains silent, now fully aware of the damage he has caused.

New information softens his judgment: Beth could have married Joe Roberts, who is worth over twenty million dollars. Wally has been offered a higher-paying job elsewhere. And several companies are bidding millions for Mr. Calhoun's bottle-washer invention. Ban is crushed by the realization that he has grievously misjudged the Calhouns.

In a moment of weakness, Ban steals a bracelet from the gift box Wally delivered—Vic's intended wedding present for Beth. Lottie discovers the box is empty, and Vic quickly calls the Calhouns to come over to resolve the situation.

Tensions explode when the Calhouns arrive, and accusations fly. Finally, Bancroft confesses to the theft, explaining he felt responsible for driving Beth away and saw this as his misguided attempt to bring her back. His heartfelt confession prompts forgiveness all around.

Beth and Vic are joyfully reunited and insist that Ban be their best man after all. With the families reconciled, everyone prepares for what promises to be the happiest wedding in New York.

== Cast ==
- Richard Bennett as Vic Arnold
- Doris Kenyon as Beth Calhoun
- Robert McWade as P. H. Bancroft
- Robert Edeson as Mr. Calhoun
- Gladys Brockwell as Lottie Bancroft
- John Miljan as Joe Roberts
- Vera Lewis as Mrs. Calhoun
- Stanley Taylor as Wally Calhoun
- James T. Mack as Casey
- Patricia Caron as Maid

== Preservation ==
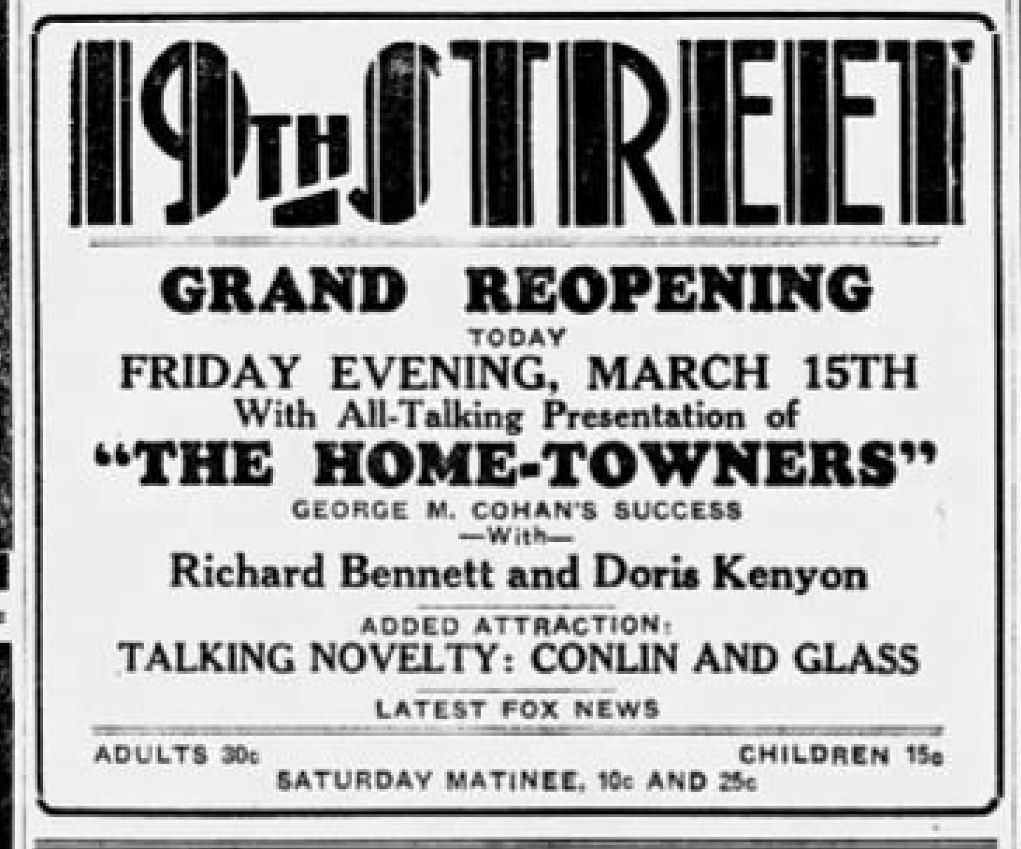
Newspaper advertisement promoting the film.

The Home Towners is now lost.

== See also ==
- List of early sound feature films (1926–1929)

== Bibliography ==
- Roy Liebman. Vitaphone Films: A Catalogue of the Features and Shorts. McFarland, 2003.
