= The World Changes =

1933 film by Mervyn LeRoy

- Directed by: Mervyn LeRoy
- Written by: Sheridan Gibney (story); Edward Chodorov
- Produced by: Robert Lord; Edward Chodorov (uncredited)
- Starring: Paul Muni; Aline MacMahon; Mary Astor
- Edited by: William Holmes
- Music by: Bernhard Kaun
- Production company: First National Pictures
- Distributed by: Warner Bros. Pictures
- Release date: November 25, 1933
- Running time: 91 minutes
- Country: United States
- Language: English
- Budget: $348,000
- Box office: $681,000

The World Changes is a 1933 American pre-Code drama film directed by Mervyn LeRoy and starring Paul Muni as an ambitious farm boy who becomes rich, but does not handle success well. Aline MacMahon and Mary Astor play his mother and wife, respectively.

== Plot ==
In the Dakota Territory in 1856, pregnant Anna Nordholm and her husband Orin build a cabin for a simple farm life. Orin plows the fields, and Anna chops wood; Orin Jr. is an infant. They see another family moving west to California to live off the land and raise a family. They become neighbors, and Anna thinks that they will live there forever. Orin dreams of a town with hundreds of families, and Orinville is established. Eleven years later, Orin says at a wedding that he hopes Orin Jr. will marry his childhood friend Selma.

Orin Jr. speaks with a gambler in 1877 about money to be made driving steers north from Texas, but his parents disapprove. He sneaks out of the house in the middle of the night, leaving a letter that he will drive steers and Selma will understand. Orin goes to Omaha, where James Clafflin is a businessman. James talks Orin into driving the cattle to Chicago. During the drive, he encounters a river, thunderstorms, and bandits who frighten his cattle. Orin returns home to tell his parents and Selma. Orin Sr. asks why he cannot stay in Orinville, but thinks that what drove him and Anna west is what drives his son to Chicago. Orin asks Selma to leave with him, but she refuses.

James' daughter, Ginny, visits and meets Orin; they marry in 1879. When James dies in 1881, Ginny is distraught that everyone at his funeral is from the stockyard. Other cattlemen complain that Orin is too ruthless, and pressure the bank to not renew his loan. Orin tells the bank to invest in his meat-freezing equipment instead. He spends all his money on development, and his secretary says, "If only we could put ice boxes on wheels." This gives Orin an idea.

He lives on a palatial estate in 1893 with Ginny and their sons, Richard and John. Orin is upset to read that Anna will not visit them. He and Ginny quarrel about the boys visiting stockyards. She has a breakdown, and locks herself in their bedroom.

In 1904, Ginny is excited that the Clintons, an old eastern family, will visit from New York. Orin thinks that they are trying to take his company, and does not want to spend money on a party. Ginny wants Richard to marry Jennifer Clinton. Ginny announces at the party that Orin is retiring and establishing an art gallery, and his company's stock falls. Orin rages against Wall Street, and wants the family to stay in Chicago. Ginny becomes ill; Orin wants to care for her, but there is a run on the company's stock. When Orin returns home, Ginny has a psychotic break, collapses and dies. Richard and John blame Orin for her death, and he says that he will sell the company.

Orin reads at his club during the 1920s that his granddaughter Natalie will marry English nobleman Philip Ivor. He and his grandson, Orin III, are upset; Jennifer Clinton says that the younger Orin is like his grandfather. Richard is a Wall Street banker, funded by Orin. Philip visits Orin Jr., who tells Richard that he is making a mistake by letting Natalie marry him. Jennifer orders him out of their house. Orin III reads that Anna, almost 90, will visit New York. He is excited because he has never met his great-grandmother, but Orin Jr. does not want his mother to know about his family's troubles. Anna is dismayed to learn that the family lives on his money.

In late October 1929, the stock market crashes and Richard and his son Paul face prison. Orin Jr. will not bail them out; he is happy to see Orin III and young Selma, and leaves him all his assets to start a new life in South Dakota. Paul runs away to avoid prison. Richard learns that Jennifer has been having an affair with Ogden, who stole money, and kills himself in front of her. Orin Jr. sees Richard's body, flashes back to Ginny, falls down the stairs and dies. Orin III and young Selma return to Orinville with Anna to start a new life.

== Cast ==
- Paul Muni as Orin Nordholm Jr.
- Aline MacMahon as Anna Nordholm
- Mary Astor as Virginia Clafflin Nordholm
- Donald Cook as Richard Nordholm
- Jean Muir as Selma Peterson II
- Mickey Rooney as Otto Peterson as a Child
- Guy Kibbee as James Clafflin
- Patricia Ellis as Natalie Clinton Nordholm
- Theodore Newton as Paul Nordholm
- Margaret Lindsay as Jennifer Clinton Nordholm
- Gordon Westcott as John Nordholm
- Alan Dinehart as Ogden Jarrett
- William Janney as Orin Nordholm III
- Charles Middleton as Wild Bill Hickok
- George Chandler as Piano Player
- Henry O'Neill as Orin Nordholm

== Box office ==
According to Warner Bros. records, the film earned $376,000 domestically and $305,000 internationally.
