= The Millionaire (1931 film) =

1931 film

- Theatrical Poster
- Directed by: John G. Adolfi
- Written by: Julien Josephson; Booth Tarkington; Maude T. Howell
- Based on: Idle Hands; 1921 story in The Saturday Evening Post by Earl Derr Biggers
- Produced by: John G. Adolfi
- Starring: George Arliss; David Manners; Evalyn Knapp; Florence Arliss; James Cagney
- Cinematography: James Van Trees
- Edited by: Owen Marks
- Music by: Alois Reiser
- Distributed by: Warner Bros. Pictures
- Release date: May 1, 1931
- Running time: 80 minutes
- Country: United States
- Language: English
- Budget: $283,000
- Box office: $835,000

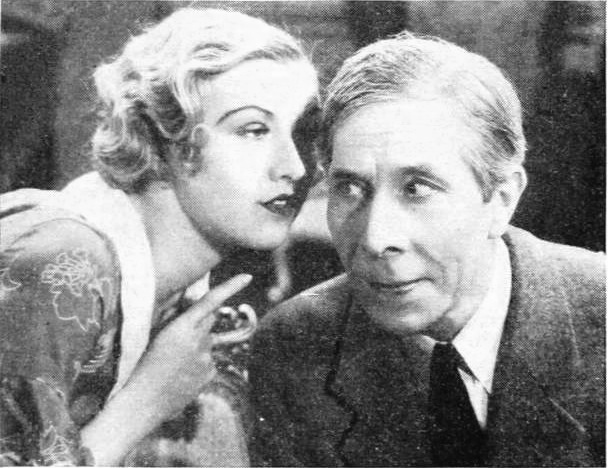
Evalyn Knapp and George Arliss

The Millionaire is a 1931 pre-Code comedy film produced and distributed by Warner Bros. Pictures and starring George Arliss in the title role. The film is a remake of the 1922 film titled The Ruling Passion, which also starred Arliss. The film was based on the short story "Idle Hands" by Earl Derr Biggers. In one of his early film roles, James Cagney had a brief but key appearance as a life insurance salesman. The supporting cast features Florence Arliss, David Manners, Evalyn Knapp, Noah Beery Sr., Cagney, J. Farrell MacDonald, Charley Grapewin and Tully Marshall.

== Plot ==
Wealthy car manufacturer James Alden is forced to retire by his physician, Dr. Harvey. However, idleness soon bores him. He takes the advice of a brash life-insurance salesman and buys a half-interest in a gas station from a stranger named Peterson without telling his wife, Laura, or socialite daughter, Babs. Because he is known nationwide, he uses the alias Charles Miller.

On their first day in business, Babs coincidentally stops at the station for gas. The partner, William 'Bill' Merrick, recognizes her (they met once at a dance at the University of Michigan) and starts a conversation.

Unfortunately, on their first day they also discover that they've been swindled. A new highway has just opened, and Peterson's new gas station takes nearly all their business. Refusing to give up, James convinces Bill to borrow $1,000 from his aunt to build a new gas station right across the street from Peterson's. Bill is an architect, so he does the design work. With James' business acumen, they thrive, while Peterson languishes.

Soon Babs is a frequent customer. James is secretly pleased because he disapproved of the rich idler she had been dating, Carter Andrews, but publicly he discourages his daughter from seeing someone not of their lofty social rank.

In the end, Peterson buys out James and Bill (at a substantial profit to them). Bill finally works up the courage to speak to Babs' father about marrying her and is stunned to learn his future in-law's identity.

== Cast ==
- George Arliss as James Alden / "Charles Miller"
- Florence Arliss as Laura Alden
- David Manners as William "Bill" Merrick
- Evalyn Knapp as Barbara "Babs" Alden
- James Cagney as Schofield
- Bramwell Fletcher as Carter Andrews
- Noah Beery as L. Peterson
- Ivan F. Simpson as Davis, the butler
- J.C. Nugent as Dr. Harvey
- Sam Hardy as "Mac" McCoy
- J. Farrell MacDonald as Dan Lewis
- Charley Grapewin as Edward "Ed" Powers
- Charles E. Evans as The Gardener
- Tully Marshall as Mr Briggs

== Box office ==
According to Warner Bros records, the film earned $542,000 domestically and $293,000 foreign.

== Preservation status ==
- A print is preserved in the Library of Congress collection.
