= The Ruling Passion (1922 film) =

1922 film

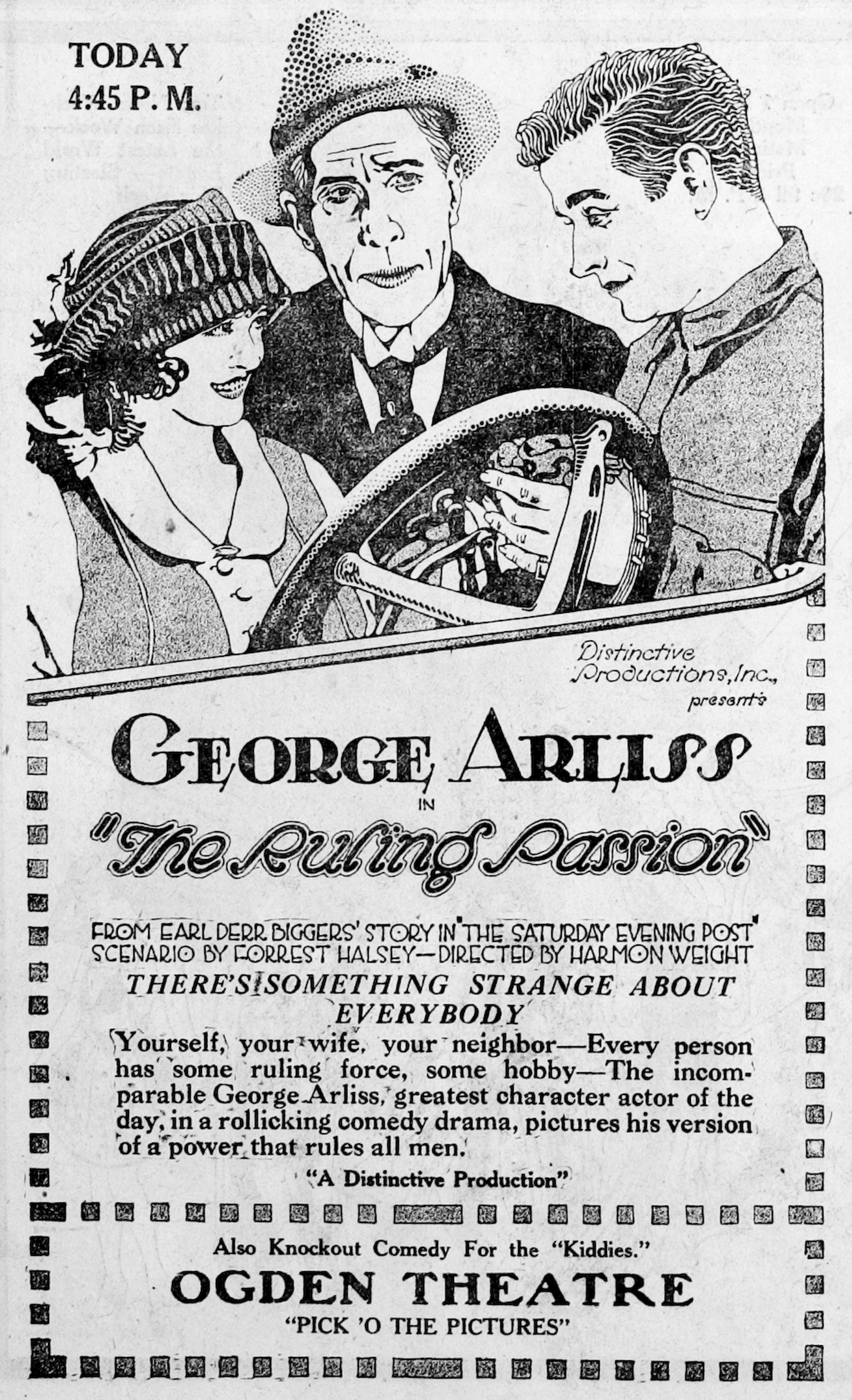
- Contemporary newspaper advertisement.
- Directed by: F. Harmon Weight
- Screenplay by: Forrest Halsey
- Based on: Idle Hands; 1921 story in The Saturday Evening Post by Earl Derr Biggers
- Produced by: Distinctive Pictures
- Starring: George Arliss; Doris Kenyon; Edmund Burns; Ida Darling; J. W. Johnston; Ernest Hilliard
- Cinematography: Harry Fischbeck
- Production company: Distinctive Productions
- Distributed by: United Artists
- Release date: January 22, 1922
- Running time: 70 minutes
- Country: United States
- Language: Silent (English intertitles)

The Ruling Passion is a 1922 American silent comedy film directed by F. Harmon Weight and written by Forrest Halsey based upon a short story by Earl Derr Biggers. The film stars George Arliss, Doris Kenyon, Edmund Burns, Ida Darling, J. W. Johnston, and Ernest Hilliard. The film was released on January 22, 1922, by United Artists. A print of The Ruling Passion survives at Gosfilmofond in Moscow. In 1931, Arliss starred in a talkie remake, The Millionaire.

== Plot ==
As described in a film magazine, James Alden, a kind-hearted philanthropist, is persuaded to retire from the automobile manufacturing business by his wife and daughter Angie, and he accepts the advice of his physician Dr. Stillings and goes to live quietly at his Long Island home. Being active and healthy, however, he is not contented, and secretly buys an interest in an automobile repair garage with Bill Merrick, a young man just back from overseas. James assumes the name John Grant for this, and complications arise when Angie meets Bill, who does not know that his partner is her father. The man they purchased the garage from threatens to force them out of business. Bill, feeling sorry for his partner who "has a wife and daughter depending on him," decides to apply to James Alden for help, because his partner John Grant stated he worked for him for years. James refuses the request for aid, however, and Angie tenders her own check to Bill. Finally, when Bill goes to ask for Angie's hand in marriage, James has to confess to the astonished young man that he is also his partner. James has won back his health and a new son-in-law.

== Cast ==
- George Arliss as James Alden
- Doris Kenyon as Angie Alden
- Edmund Burns as 'Bill' Merrick
- Ida Darling as Mrs. Alden
- J. W. Johnston as Peterson
- Ernest Hilliard as Carter Andrews
- Harold Waldridge as Al
- Brian Darley as Dr. Stillings
