= Disraeli (1921 film) =

1921 American film by Henry Kolker

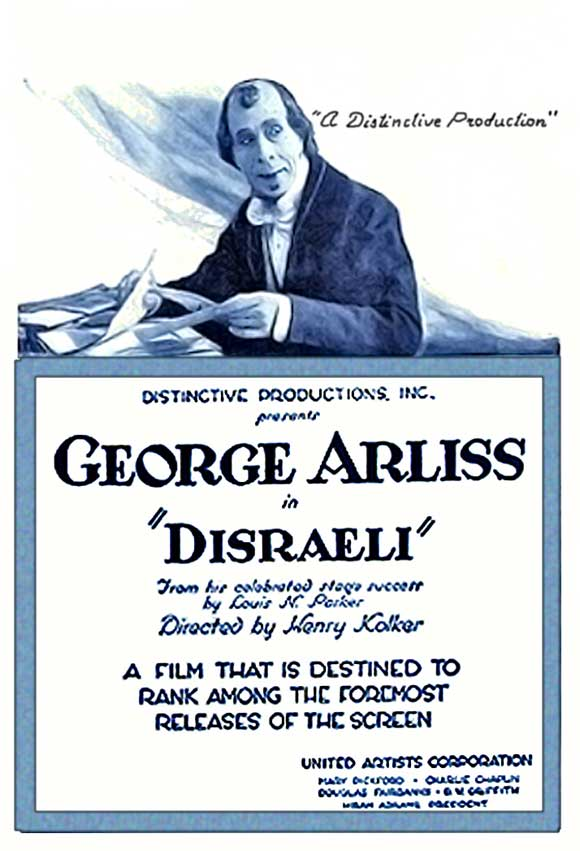
- 1921 theatrical poster
- Directed by: Henry Kolker
- Written by: Forrest Halsey (scenario)
- Based on: Disraeli; 1911 play by Louis Napoleon Parker
- Produced by: Distinctive Productions (formed by Arliss)
- Starring: George Arliss
- Cinematography: Harry Fischbeck
- Distributed by: United Artists
- Release date: August 28, 1921
- Running time: 7-9 reels at 6800 feet (circa 80-90 minutes)
- Country: United States
- Language: Silent (English intertitles)

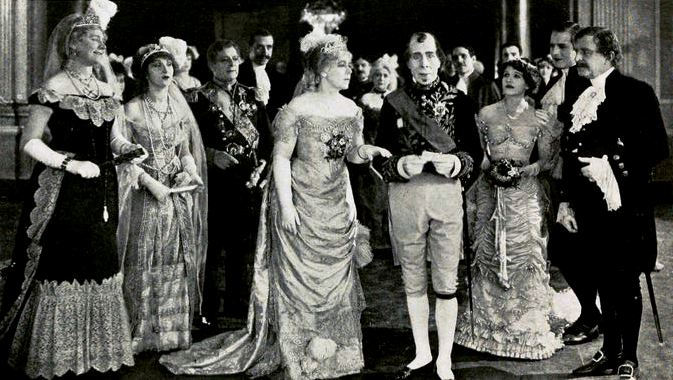
George Arliss (third from right) in the 1921 silent version of the film

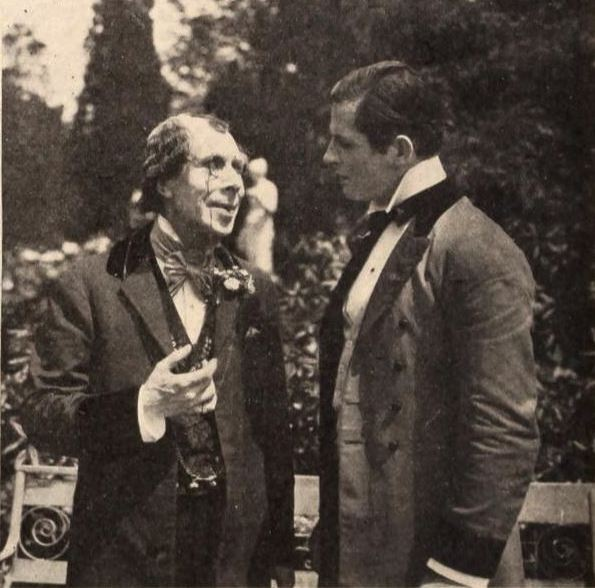
George Arliss and Reginald Denny

Disraeli (1921) is an American silent historical drama film directed by Henry Kolker and starring George Arliss. This film features Arliss's portrayal of Benjamin Disraeli. He had played the same role in the play Disraeli in 1911. Arliss also reprised this role in the 1929 sound film Disraeli.

A British film of the play, Disraeli, had been made in 1916 with the permission of the author Louis Napoleon Parker. Because of the production of the 1916 film angered Arliss while he was still performing the play on Broadway, Arliss later secured all screen rights to the play from its author Louis Napoleon Parker. The 1921 movie is the result of Arliss's use of his rights after his efforts and frustrations with Parker.

== Plot ==
As described in a film magazine, Disraeli, a middle class Jew, has become the British Prime Minister under Queen Victoria and incurs the enmity of nobles and racist snobs. He knows that Russia is angling through diplomacy and intrigue for possession of the Suez Canal and, realizing that unless Britain secures it, the strength of her empire will be lost. He plays a lone game for control of the canal and wins. In his final hour of honor at court, those who stood against him claim the honor of having helped him.

== Cast ==
- George Arliss as Benjamin Disraeli
- Florence Arliss as Lady Beaconsfield (credited as Mrs. George Arliss)
- Margaret Dale as Mrs. Noel Travers
- Louise Huff as Clarissa
- Reginald Denny as Charles, Viscount Deeford
- E. J. Ratcliffe as Hugh Meyers
- Henry Carvill as Duke of Glastonbury
- Grace Griswold as Duchess of Glastonbury
- Noel Tearle as Foljambe
- Fred Nicholls as Butler
- Betty Blythe as (undetermined role)

== Preservation ==
According to silentera.com, this is a lost film with the exception of one reel held at the George Eastman Museum. The FIAF database and Library of Congress Silent Database list complete copies of Disraeli in Gosfilmofond, Moscow, Russia, and Cinematheque Royale de Belgique in Brussels.

== See also ==
- List of rediscovered films
