= Theodore Newton (actor) =

American actor (1904–1963)

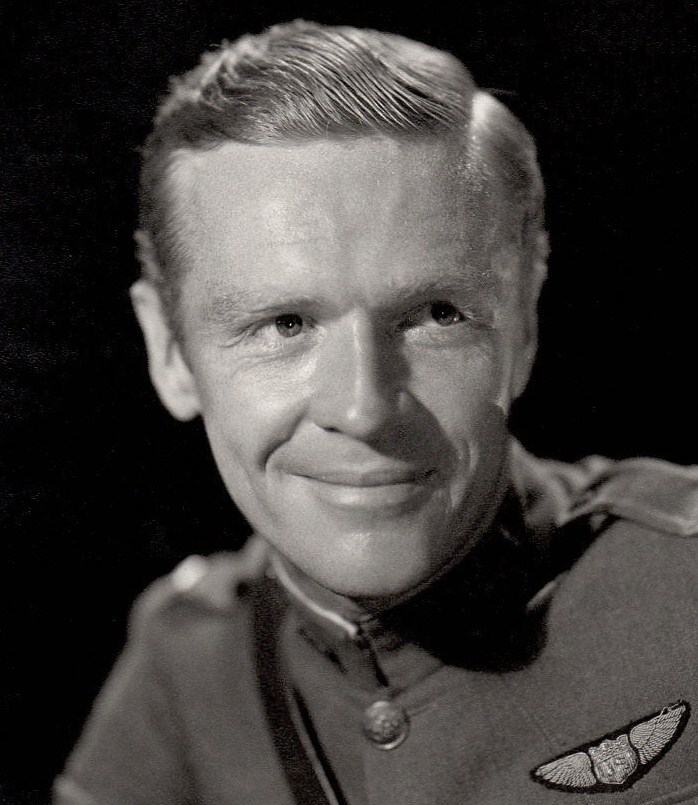
- Newton in Ace of Aces (1933)
- Born: August 4, 1904; Lawrenceville, New Jersey, U.S.
- Died: February 28, 1963 (aged 58); Hollywood, California, U.S.
- Other name: Ted Newton
- Occupation: Actor
- Years active: 1927–1963
- Spouses: Alexandrina Hill (m. 1936; div. 1944) Emily Lawrence (m. 1949)
- Children: 2

Theodore Newton (August 4, 1904 – February 28, 1963) was an American film and stage actor. He was sometimes billed as Ted Newton.

== Early years ==
Newton's parents were Mr. and Mrs. C. Bertram Newton.

He failed out of Princeton University after two and a half years and worked as a bank clerk in Philadelphia. In the evenings, he began acting with the Hedgerow Theatre.

== Career ==
Newton's Broadway credits included (billed as "Ted Newton") The Royal Family (1950), The Lady from the Sea (1950), The Big Knife (1949), Apology (1943), My Sister Eileen (1940), Suzanna and the Elders (1940), The Man Who Came to Dinner (1939), Wise Tomorrow (1937), Dead End (1935), Vermont (1928) and Elmer the Great (1928).

In 1933, Newton made his first film appearance, and he eventually acted in almost 30 films.

== Personal life ==
On November 22, 1936, Newton married actress Drina Hill. They divorced, and on May 9, 1949, he married actress Emily Lawrence in Newtown, Pennsylvania.

== Death ==
Newton died of cancer in Hollywood, California at age 58.

== Partial filmography ==
- Central Airport (1933) – Radio Operator (uncredited)
- The Working Man (1933) – Tommy Hartland
- The Sphinx (1933) – Jack Burton
- Voltaire (1933) – Francois
- Ace of Aces (1933) – Lieutenant Foster 'Froggy' Kelley
- From Headquarters (1933) – Jack Winton
- The World Changes (1933) – Paul Nordholm
- Heat Lightning (1934) – Steve Laird
- A Modern Hero (1934) – Elmer Croy
- Upper World (1934) – Reporter Rocklen
- Now I'll Tell (1934) – Joe
- Let's Try Again (1934) – Paul Milburn
- Blind Date (1934) – Tom (uncredited)
- Gambling (1934) – Ray Braddock
- Jalna (1935) – Piers Whiteoak
- The Hidden Eye (1945) – Gibbs – Chauffeur
- What Next, Corporal Hargrove? (1945) – Captain Parkson
- Miss Susie Slagle's (1946) – Dr. Boyd
- From This Day Forward (1946) – Mr. Brewer (uncredited)
- Two Years Before the Mast (1946) – Hayes
- Alfred Hitchcock Presents (1956) (Season 1 Episode 32: "The Baby Sitter") – Mr. Nash
- Alfred Hitchcock Presents (1956) (Season 1 Episode 34: "The Hidden Thing") – Inspector Shea
- The Come On (1956) – Detective Captain Getz
- The Proud and Profane (1956) – Bob Kilpatrick
- Somebody Up There Likes Me (1956) – Athletic Commissioner Edward Eagan
- Friendly Persuasion (1956) – Major Harvey
- Alfred Hitchcock Presents (1957) (Season 2 Episode 37: "The Indestructible Mr. Weems") – Dr. Allen
- The Saga of Hemp Brown (1958) – John Murphy (uncredited)
- Perry Mason (1958) (Season 1 Episode 32 'The case of the Substitute Face") - Carl Houser
- Gunsmoke (1958) (Season 3 Episode 22: "Sunday Supplement") – Major
- The Story on Page One (1959) – Dr. Kemper (uncredited)
- Wagon Train (1959) (Season 2 Episode 15: "The Flint McCullough Story") – Jim Bridger
- Wagon Train (1959) (Season 2 Episode 16: "The Hunter Malloy Story") – Darly Grant
- Wagon Train (1959) (Season 3 Episode 3: "The C.L. Harding Story") – Buzz
- Wagon Train (1960) (Season 3 Episode 20: "The Ricky and Laurie Bell Story") – Jacob
- Leave it to Beaver (1960) (Season 3 Episode 18: "Beaver's Library Book") – Mr. Davenport (aired January 30)
- Alfred Hitchcock Presents (1960) (Season 5 Episode 36: "Letter of Credit") – Sam Kern
- Alfred Hitchcock Presents (1960) (Season 6 Episode 8: "O Youth and Beauty") as Physician
- Rawhide (TV series) (1960) (Season 3 Episode 5: "Incident of the Slavemaster") – Somers
- Rawhide (TV series) (1961) (Season 4 Episode 12: "Twenty-Five Santa Clauses") – Doctor
- Alfred Hitchcock Presents (1962) (Season 7 Episode 16: "The Case of M.J.H.") as Dr. Cooper
- The Alfred Hitchcock Hour (1963) (Season 1 Episode 16: "What Really Happened") as Doctor
- Dime with a Halo (1963) – Consul Glenson (final film role)
