= The Devil (1921 film) =

1921 film

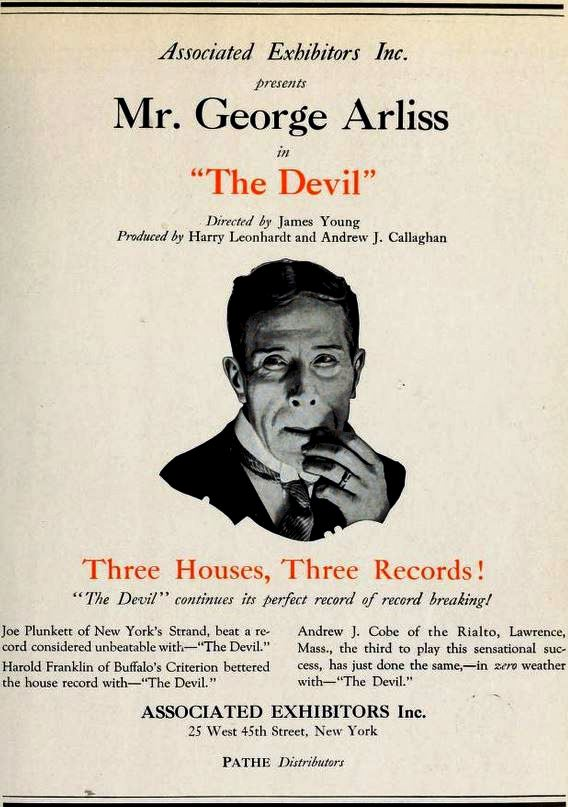
- Exhibitor's ad
- Directed by: James Young
- Written by: Edmund Goulding
- Based on: play The Devil by Ferenc Molnár
- Produced by: Associated Distributors Incorporated; Harry Leonhardt; Andrew J. Callaghan
- Cinematography: Harry Fischbeck
- Production company: Pathé Exchange
- Distributed by: Associated Exhibitors
- Release date: January 16, 1921
- Running time: 60 minutes
- Country: United States
- Language: Silent (English intertitles)

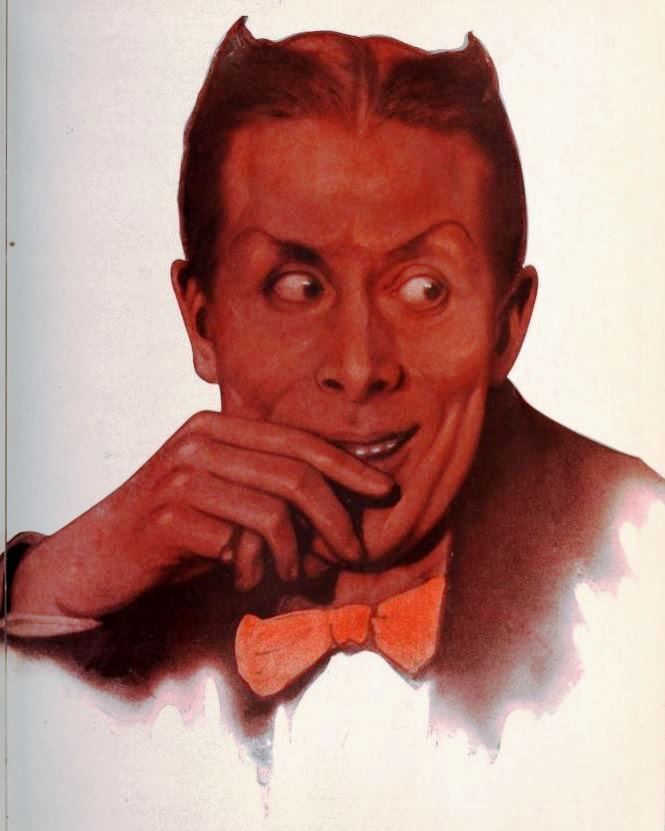
George Arliss in character.

The Devil is a surviving 1921 silent drama film directed by James Young and starring stage actor George Arliss in a film version of his 1908 Broadway success of Ferenc Molnár's play, The Devil (Hungarian: Az ördög). Long thought to be a lost film, a print was discovered in the 1990s and restored by the Library of Congress.

This was George Arliss' first film following a successful career on Broadway. Arliss' wife Florence Arliss co-starred with him in the film, and continued to do so until he died in 1946. Future Oscar-winner Fredric March had an uncredited bit part in the film.

== Plot ==
The Devil, in the guise of a human named Dr. Muller, meets the young couple Marie and her fiance Georges. They remark, upon looking at a Renaissance painting of a martyr, that Evil could never triumph over Good. The Devil, taking this as a challenge, decides to bring about the couple's downfall. In the end, Marie resorts to the power of prayer and a shining crucifix appears which causes the Devil to disappear in a burst of flames.

== Cast ==
- George Arliss as Dr. Muller/The Devil
- Lucy Cotton as Marie Matin
- Roland Bottomley as Georges Roben
- Sylvia Breamer as Mimi
- Florence Arliss as Marie's Aunt (credited as Mrs. George Arliss)
- Edmund Lowe as Paul de Veaux
- Fredric March as Bal Masque Participant (uncredited)

== Preservation status ==
A copy of The Devil is preserved in the Library of Congress collection and the Archives Du Film Du CNC, Bois d'Arcy.
