= The Working Man =

1933 film by John G. Adolfi

- Window card
- Directed by: John G. Adolfi
- Written by: Charles Kenyon; Maude T. Howell
- Based on: The Adopted Father; 1916 story in All-Story Weekly by Edgar Franklin
- Produced by: Jack L. Warner; Darryl F. Zanuck
- Starring: George Arliss; Bette Davis
- Cinematography: Sol Polito
- Edited by: George Amy; Warren Low
- Music by: Leo F. Forbstein
- Production company: Warner Bros. Pictures
- Distributed by: Warner Bros. Pictures
- Release date: April 20, 1933
- Running time: 78 minutes
- Country: United States
- Language: English
- Budget: $193,000
- Box office: $822,000

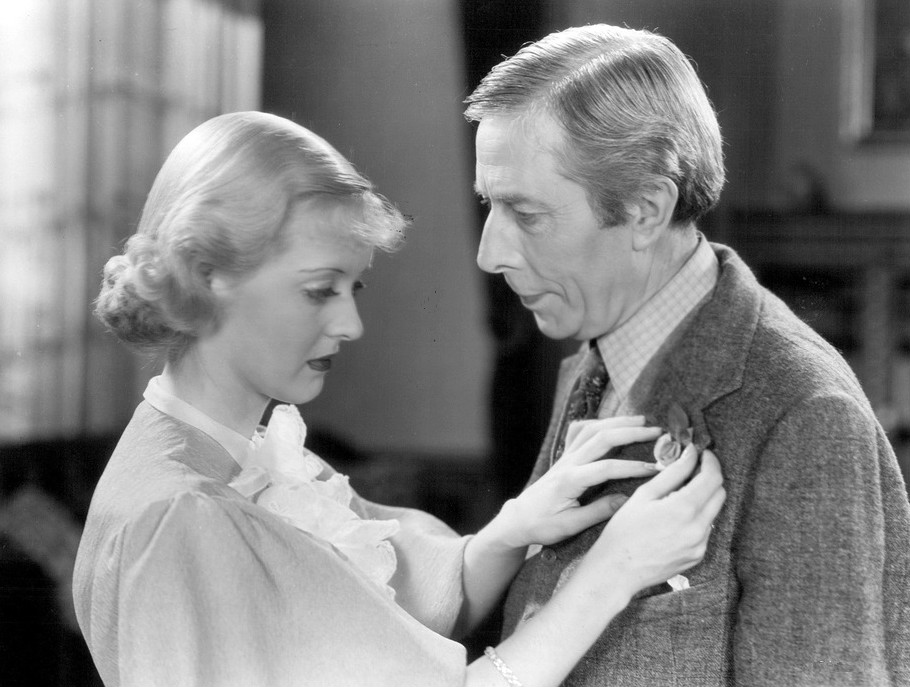
Bette Davis and George Arliss

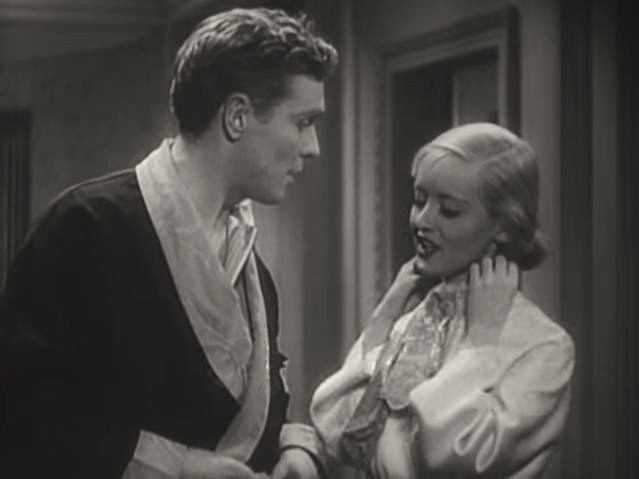
Theodore Newton and Bette Davis

The Working Man is a 1933 pre-Code American comedy film starring George Arliss and Bette Davis, and directed by John G. Adolfi. The screenplay by Charles Kenyon and Maude T. Howell is based on the story The Adopted Father by Edgar Franklin. The film is preserved in the Library of Congress collection.

== Plot ==
Successful shoe manufacturer John Reeves is annoyed with his staff, particularly his conceited nephew and company general manager Benjamin Burnett (who considers himself the driving force behind the firm), because they are losing ground to their longtime chief rival, headed by former best friend Tom Hartland. The two men had had a falling out after falling in love with the same woman; she married Hartland, and Reeves remained a bachelor. Nevertheless, Reeves is saddened to learn of Hartland's death.

When Benjamin begins to muse that his uncle has started down the road to senility, Reeves decides to teach him a lesson. He heads off on a fishing vacation in Maine, leaving his nephew to deal with the business situation by himself.

By chance, a large yacht moors near his fishing boat. When Jenny and Tommy Hartland, the party-loving offspring and heirs of Tom Hartland, swim over to see if anyone can supply them with liquor, Reeves is a little disgusted with their idle ways. Hiding his identity and calling himself John Walton, he befriends them in order to do a little spying on their company. However, as he gets to know them better, he begins to like them. They take him along with them back to New York, as they are responsible for a minor injury he suffers.

"Walton" gets them to take him on a tour of their plant, which he discovers is being deliberately mismanaged by Fred Pettison. He figures out that Pettison is driving it into bankruptcy so he can buy it cheaply later. Using a gambit, Reeves persuades Tommy to have him appointed a trustee of the Hartland estate. Tommy and Jenny expect him to do away with the restraints imposed upon them. When two other trustees express their concern about the fisherman's qualifications, Reeves reveals his identity and the fact that he has grown fond of the young people who, if things had turned out differently, could have been his own children.

Once Reeves becomes a trustee, he starts making wholesale changes on both the domestic and business sides of life. He quickly discharges most of the household servants, as the estate is nearly depleted, forcing Jenny and Tommy to mature quickly. Pettison is fired. Tommy begins working at his own company, while his sister, anxious to find out why their shoes are less popular than those manufactured by Reeves, takes a filing job with the rival company under the alias Jane Grey. She finds herself attracted to Benjamin. When Benjamin summons her to his office to fire her for her total lack of business skills, he finds her very appealing. Upon learning the news, she starts crying, and Benjamin reconsiders his decision. In the end, he reassigns her to work in his private office.

Meanwhile, Reeves has revitalized the Hartland Shoe Company, and it start making serious inroads into Reeves Company territory. Benjamin is puzzled, as the methods used by Hartland seem strikingly similar to those employed by Reeves. When Pettison shows up in Benjamin's office looking for a job, he sees Jane. She begs him to keep her secret, but he tells Benjamin who she really is and lies, accusing her of spying on the Reeves company. This ends their budding romance.

In the end, Benjamin insists on meeting "John Walton", and Reeves has to reveal his true identity to the Hartlands. Once they get over the shock, and Reeves informs his nephew that Jenny was not a spy, the young couple reconcile. All agree to Reeves' proposal that the two companies merge.

== Cast ==
- George Arliss as John Reeves
- Bette Davis as Jenny Hartland, aka Jane Grey
- Theodore Newton as Tommy Hartland
- Hardie Albright as Benjamin Burnett
- Gordon Westcott as Fred Pettison
- J. Farrell MacDonald as Henry Davis

== Production notes ==
The Warner Bros. release marked the second pairing of George Arliss and Bette Davis, who co-starred in The Man Who Played God the year before.

The film had its world premiere at Radio City Music Hall in New York City.

It was a remake of an Arliss silent film, Twenty Dollars a Week, filmed in 1924. The 1936 20th Century Fox film Everybody's Old Man was based on the same source.

== Principal production credits ==
- Producers: Jack L. Warner, Darryl F. Zanuck
- Music supervision: Leo F. Forbstein
- Cinematography: Sol Polito
- Art Direction: Jack Okey
- Costume design: Orry-Kelly

== Reception ==
In his review in The New York Times, Mordaunt Hall described the film as "breezy but somewhat shallow" and added "George Arliss offers an ingratiating charactier study in a role that suits him...Quite a number of [his] lines are humorous and there is no denying that the actor uses them most effectively. Bette Davis, whose diction is music to the ears, does good work in the role of Jenny."

TV Guide called it "a thoroughly enjoyable piece of entertainment which serves no other purpose than to put a smile on your face."

== Box office ==
According to Warner Bros. records, the film earned $401,000 domestically and $421,000 foreign.
