= George Arliss =

English actor, author and playwright (1868–1946)

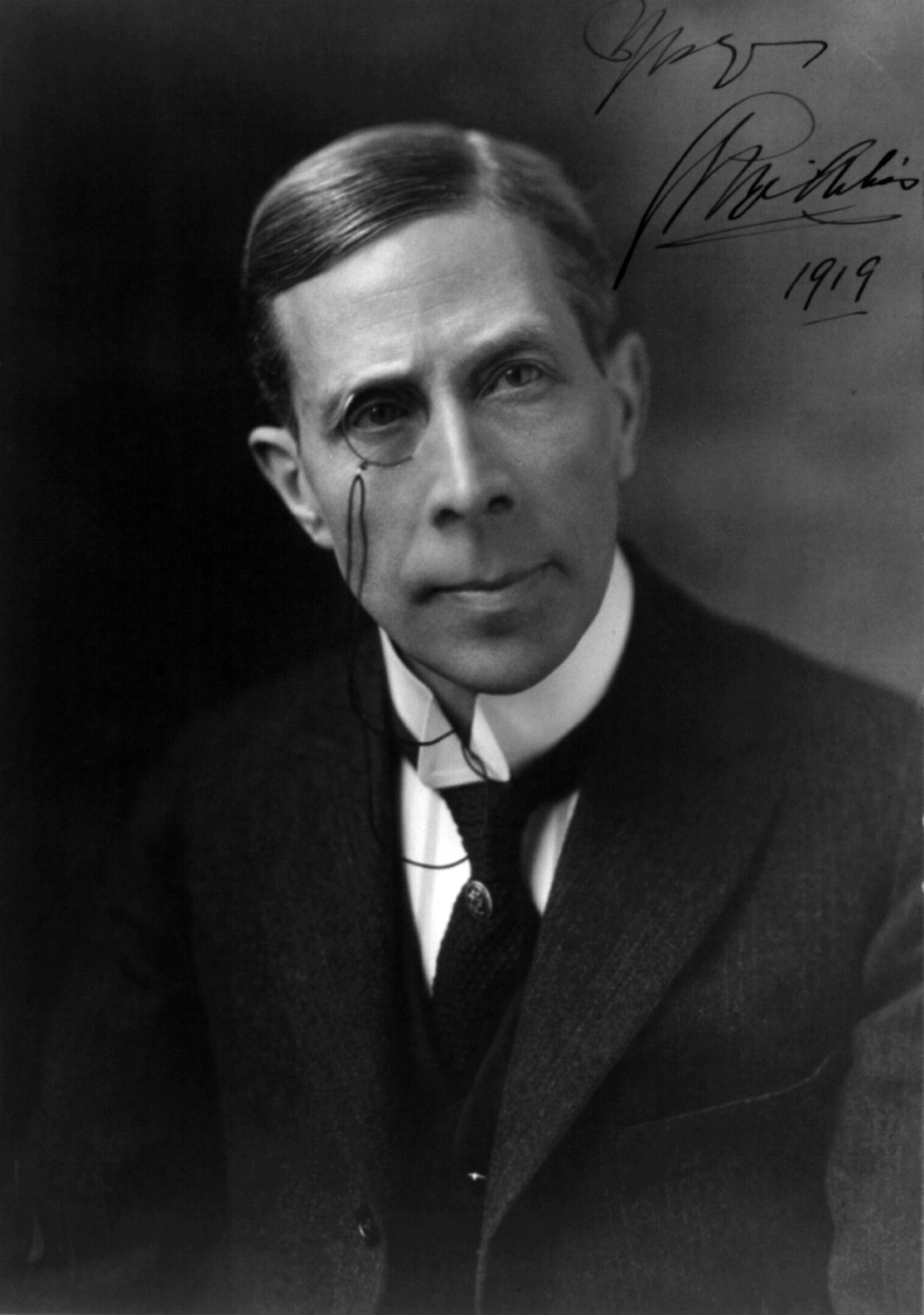
- Arliss in 1919
- Born: Augustus George Andrews; 10 April 1868; London, England
- Died: 5 February 1946 (aged 77); London, England
- Occupations: Actor; author; playwright; filmmaker
- Years active: 1887–1943
- Spouse: Florence Montgomery (m. 1899)

George Arliss (born Augustus George Andrews; 10 April 1868 – 5 February 1946) was an English actor, author, playwright, and filmmaker who found success in the United States. He was the first British actor to win an Academy Award – which he won in the Best Actor category for his performance as Victorian-era British prime minister Benjamin Disraeli in Disraeli (1929) – as well as the earliest-born actor of any category to win the honour. He specialized in successful biopics, such as Disraeli, Voltaire (1933), and Cardinal Richelieu (1935), as well as light comedies, which included The Millionaire (1931) and A Successful Calamity (1932).

His career ranged from being a star of the legitimate theatre, then silent films, then sound films.

== Early life ==
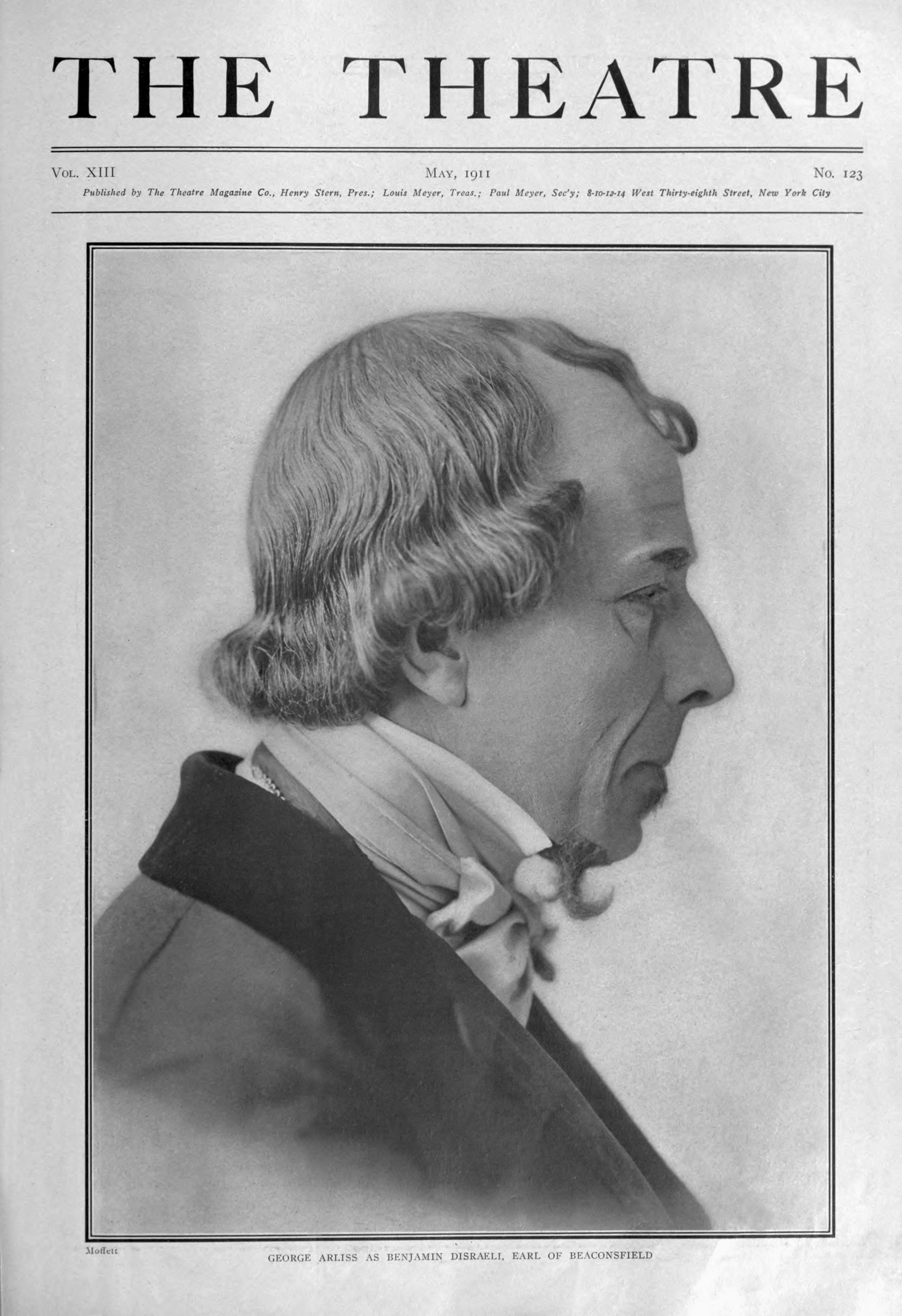
George Arliss as Benjamin Disraeli, The Theatre magazine, 1911

Arliss was born in London, and commonly listed as George Augustus Andrews. His relatives referred to him as Uncle Gus. He started work in the publishing office of his father, William Joseph Arliss Andrews, but left at age 18 to go on the stage. His brother Fred Andrews studied art, and is known for his work with Sir Aurel Stein. His sister, Anita Arliss, taught acting in Los Angeles.

== Career ==
Arliss began his theatre career in the British provinces in 1887 and by 1900 was playing London's West End in supporting roles. He embarked for a tour of America in 1901 in Mrs. Patrick Campbell's troupe, intending to remain in the United States only for the length of the tour.

Arliss stayed for twenty years, making his Broadway debut in Magda (1902). He eventually became a star in 1908 in The Devil. Producer George Tyler commissioned Louis Napoleon Parker in 1911 to write a play specifically tailored for Arliss, and the actor toured in Disraeli for five years, eventually becoming closely identified with the 19th-century British prime minister.

Writing in Vanity Fair in 1919, he outlined his plan for a nonprofit called the Theatre Annex, which would allow new plays to be tested under special conditions.

He began his film career with The Devil (1921), followed by Disraeli and four other silent films. All six of these silent films are known to have survived. He remade both The Green Goddess and Disraeli in sound in 1929 (and won the Best Actor Academy Award for Disraeli), converting successfully at the age of 61 from a star of the legitimate theatre, and then silent films, to sound films.

Arliss made 10 sound films exclusively for Warner Bros. under a contract that gave the star an unusual amount of creative control for the time. Curiously, his casting of actors and rewriting of scripts were privileges granted him by the studio that are not even mentioned in his contract. One of these films, The Man Who Played God (1932), was Bette Davis's first leading role. Until the end of her life, she credited Arliss for personally insisting upon her as his leading lady and giving her a chance to show her abilities. The two also co-starred in The Working Man in 1933.

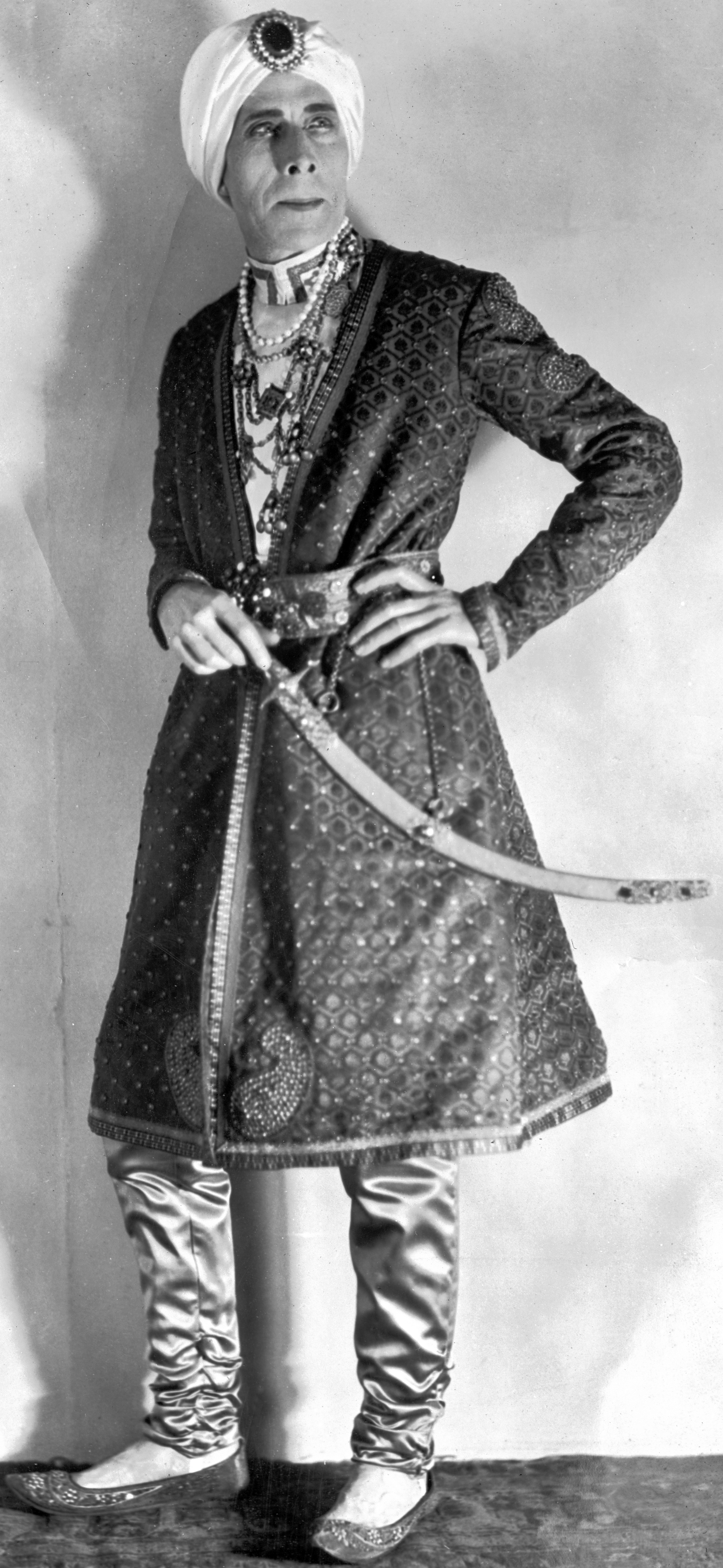
Arliss in sultan costume

Arliss built a production unit at Warners' both in front of and behind the cameras. Maude T. Howell, his stage manager, became an assistant producer and was one of the few female film executives in Hollywood at that time. After his first three films, Arliss approved John Adolfi, a capable Warners director who was open to collaboration with him. Adolfi soon was regarded as a successful director of the critically and financially acclaimed Arliss films. Arliss preferred to use the same reliable actors, such as Ivan Simpson (who was also a sculptor) and Charles Evans. He had an eye for discovering unknown talent, such as James Cagney, Randolph Scott and Dick Powell. Despite his extensive involvement in the planning and production of his films, Arliss claimed credit only for acting.

After having worked closely with Warners' production chief, Darryl F. Zanuck, Arliss left the studio when Zanuck resigned in April 1933 and set up 20th Century Pictures. A month later Adolfi died suddenly. Zanuck quickly signed Arliss to make new films at 20th Century, prompting Warners' to complain to the Motion Picture Academy of Arts and Sciences that Zanuck had "stolen" their star.

He often appeared with his wife Florence Arliss. Florence (or "Flo", as George called her) starred both on stage and in films, both silent and sound, with her husband and almost always played his character's spouse. However, that did not prevent Arliss from using another actress when Flo was not right for a role. Also, Flo turned down roles that George wanted her to play in some films.

Arliss is best remembered primarily for his witty series of historical biopics, such as Alexander Hamilton (1931), Voltaire (1933), The House of Rothschild (1934), The Iron Duke (1934), and Cardinal Richelieu (1935). However, he also had a series of domestic comedies such as The Millionaire (1931, A Successful Calamity (1932), The Working Man (1933), and The Last Gentleman (1934).

George Arliss in The House of Rothschild (1934)

In 1934, British film goers named Arliss their favourite male star.

Arliss was approaching 70 when he completed the British-made Doctor Syn in 1937. He and Flo returned to America later that year to visit old friends, including famed astronomer Edwin Hubble in California. Producer-director Cecil B. DeMille arranged for the Arlisses to re-enact their roles in Disraeli on Lux Radio Theatre, DeMille's popular radio show, in January 1938. The occasion was heralded as "a new page in radio history". George and Flo subsequently appeared on Lux in radio adaptations of The Man Who Played God in March 1938 and in Cardinal Richelieu in January 1939, which was apparently their final dramatic appearance anywhere.

Returning to their home in London in April 1939, the onset of the Second World War prevented their return to America during Arliss's remaining years. The only taint of scandal involved charges by the British Government in September 1941 that Arliss had not complied with a recent requirement to report bank accounts he maintained in the U.S. and Canada (similar charges were also brought against actor-playwright Noël Coward around the same time). Both men claimed ignorance of the new law, but they were fined and publicly humiliated by the experience.

== Personal life ==
On 14 September 1899, Arliss married Florence Arliss (née Florence Kate Montgomery Smith) (1870–1950), to whom he was married until his death. (Leslie Arliss, who became a prolific producer-director for Gainsborough Pictures, is erroneously referred to as their son in some reference works – he was in fact their nephew.)

Arliss was a prominent anti-vivisectionist who founded the National Anti-Vivisection Society of Chicago. He was president of the Episcopal Actors' Guild of America from 1921 to 1938.

He was a strict vegetarian, stating that "I eat nothing I can pat". Arliss walked four miles each day and took interest in aerobics. His dogs are buried at the Pine Ridge Pet Cemetery.

In retirement Arliss settled at Pangbourne in Berkshire. Film producer Darryl F. Zanuck tried to interest him in returning to Hollywood to star in The Pied Piper in 1942. Instead, Arliss lived out the Luftwaffe's Blitz on London and died in Maida Hill in London of a bronchial ailment on 5 February 1946, aged 77. His gravestone spurns his success in the performing arts in favor of the one achievement of which he was apparently most proud: an honorary Master of Arts degree he received from Columbia University in 1919.

== Legacy ==
Arliss wrote the autobiography Up the Years from Bloomsbury in 1927.

He has a star on the Hollywood Walk of Fame at 6648-1/2 Hollywood Boulevard. He was a member of the American Theater Hall of Fame.

== Filmography ==
Year	Title	Role	Notes
1921	The Devil	Dr. Muller	
1921	Disraeli	Benjamin Disraeli	
1922	The Man Who Played God	Montgomery Royle	
1922	The Ruling Passion	James Alden	
1922	The Starland Review	Himself	archive
1923	The Green Goddess	Rajah of Rukh	
1924	Twenty Dollars a Week	John Reeves	
1929	Disraeli	Benjamin Disraeli	Academy Award for Best Actor
1930	The Green Goddess	Raja of Rukh	Nominated – Academy Award for Best Actor
1930	Old English	Sylvanus Heythorp	
1931	Alexander Hamilton	Alexander Hamilton	
1931	The Millionaire	James Alden	
1932	A Successful Calamity	Henry Wilton	
1932	The Man Who Played God	Montgomery Royle	Released as The Silent Voice in the United Kingdom
1933	Voltaire	Voltaire	
1933	The Working Man	John Reeves	
1933	The King's Vacation	Phillip, the King	
1934	The Iron Duke	Duke of Wellington	
1934	The Last Gentleman	Cabot Barr	
1934	The House of Rothschild	Mayer Rothschild / Nathan Rothschild	Finale filmed in Technicolor
1935	The Tunnel	Prime Minister of the United Kingdom	Released as Transatlantic Tunnel in the United States
1935	Cardinal Richelieu	Cardinal Richelieu	
1935	The Guv'nor	The Guv'nor	Released as Mister Hobo in the United States
1936	His Lordship	Richard Fraser/Lorimer, Lord Duncaster	Released as Man of Affairs in the United States
1936	East Meets West	Sultan of Rungay	
1937	Doctor Syn	Dr. Syn	
1939	Land of Liberty		archive footage
1943	The Voice That Thrilled the World	Himself	segment Disraeli – archive footage, uncredited

The 1931 short film Impressions of Disraeli was made in England for the Conservative Party and was introduced by Stanley Baldwin. The film is extant.

== See also ==
- List of Academy Award winners and nominees from Great Britain
- List of actors with more than one Academy Award nomination in the acting categories
- List of oldest and youngest Academy Award winners and nominees — Oldest winners for Best Lead Actor
