= Bernhard Kaun =

American composer and orchestrator (1899–1980)

- Born: April 5, 1899; Milwaukee, Wisconsin, United States
- Died: March 1, 1980 (aged 80) Baden-Baden, Baden-Württemberg, West Germany
- Occupation: Composer

Bernhard Kaun (5 April 1899 – 3 January 1980) was an American composer and orchestrator. He is known for the Frankenstein (1931) theme.

== Filmography ==
- Platinum Blonde (1931)
- Frankenstein (1931)
- What Price Hollywood? (1932)
- Doctor X (1932)
- The Most Dangerous Game (1932)
- Thirteen Women (1932)
- A Bill of Divorcement (1932)
- I Am a Fugitive from a Chain Gang (1932)
- A Farewell to Arms (1932)
- 20,000 Years in Sing Sing (1932)
- Frisco Jenny (1932)
- Employees' Entrance (1933)
- Mystery of the Wax Museum (1933)
- King Kong (1933)
- I Loved a Woman (1933)
- The Kennel Murder Case (1933)
- Little Women (1933)
- Lady Killer (1933)
- Son of Kong (1933)
- Flying Down to Rio (1933)
- The Lost Patrol (1934)
- The Gay Divorcee (1934)
- The Little Minister (1934)
- The Informer (1935)
- Becky Sharp (1935)
- She (1935)
- The Three Musketeers (1935)
- The Last Days of Pompeii (1935)
- Peter Ibbetson (1935)
- The Petrified Forest (1936)
- Modern Times (1936)
- The Walking Dead (1936)
- The Story of Louis Pasteur (1936)
- Little Lord Fauntleroy (1936)
- Hearts Divided (1936)
- China Clipper (1936)
- The Garden of Allah (1936)
- Black Legion (1937)
- Marked Woman (1937)
- Lost Horizon (1937)
- A Star Is Born (1937)
- Souls at Sea (1937)
- The Adventures of Tom Sawyer (1938)
- The Saint in New York (1938)
- The Return of Doctor X (1939)
- Gone with the Wind (1939)
- They Died with Their Boots On (1941)
- Kings Row (1942)
- Mission to Moscow (1943)
- Background to Danger (1943)
- The Adventures of Mark Twain (1944)
- Saratoga Trunk (1945)
- Tomorrow Is Forever (1946)
- Devotion (1946)
- The Bravados (1958)
- The Fly (1958)
