= 1917 in literature =

This article contains information about the literary events and publications of 1917.

== Events ==
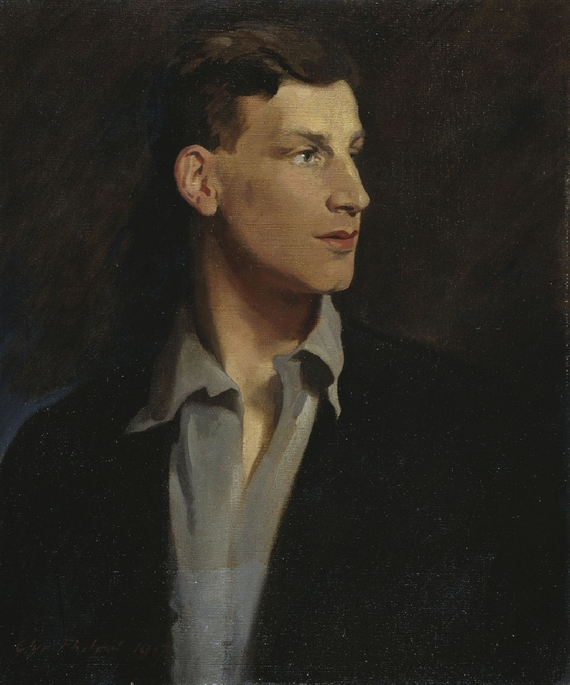
Portrait of Siegfried Sassoon by Glyn Warren Philpot, 1917

- January
  - Francis Picabia produces the first issue of the Dada periodical 391 in Barcelona.
  - Philosopher Hu Shih, the main advocate of replacing scholarly language with the vernacular in Chinese literature, publishes an article in the magazine New Youth, "A Preliminary Discussion of Literature Reform", offering eight guidelines for writers.
  - J. R. R. Tolkien, on medical leave from the British Army at Great Haywood, begins The Book of Lost Tales (the first version of The Silmarillion), starting with the "Fall of Gondolin". This first chronicles Tolkien's mythopoeic Middle-earth legendarium in prose.
- February 4 or 5 – The English writer Hugh Kingsmill is captured in action in France.
- February 16 – The publisher Boni & Liveright is founded in New York City by Horace Liveright with Albert Boni, and initiates the "Modern Library" imprint.
- April – Leonard and Virginia Woolf take delivery of a hand printing press needed to establish the Hogarth Press at their home in Richmond upon Thames. Their first publication is Two Stories.
- May – W. B. Yeats acquires Thoor Ballylee in Ireland.
- June 4 – The first Pulitzer Prizes are awarded: Laura E. Richards, Maude H. Elliott, and Florence Hall receive the first for biography (for Julia Ward Howe), Jean Jules Jusserand the first for history with With Americans of Past and Present Days, and Herbert B. Swope the first for journalism for his work for the New York World.
- June 18 – Luigi Pirandello's drama Right You Are (if you think so) (Così è (se vi pare)) is first performed, in Milan.
- July – Siegfried Sassoon issues a "Soldier's Declaration" against prolonging World War I. He is sent by the military (with assistance from Robert Graves) to Edinburgh's Craiglockhart War Hospital, where Wilfred Owen introduces himself on August 18. At Sassoon's urging, Owen writes his two great war poems, "Anthem for Doomed Youth" and "Dulce et Decorum est", although like almost all his poetry they remain unpublished until after his death in action next year. Their meeting would later inspire Stephen MacDonald's drama Not About Heroes (1982) and Pat Barker's novel Regeneration (1991).
- Summer – The Siuru expressionist and neo-romantic literary movement in Estonia is formed by young poets and writers.
- September 6 – At the National Eisteddfod of Wales in Birkenhead, the Chairing of the Bard ceremony ends with the chair draped in black, the winner, Hedd Wyn, having died a month earlier in battle.
- October
  - Ernest Hemingway takes his first job, as a reporter on The Kansas City Star.
  - D. H. Lawrence is forced to leave Cornwall at three days' notice under terms of the Defence of the Realm Act in the United Kingdom.
- October 20 – The 51-year-old poet W. B. Yeats marries 25-year-old Georgie Hyde-Lees at Harrow Road register office in London, with Ezra Pound as best man, a couple of months after Yeats' proposal of marriage to his ex-mistress's daughter, Iseult Gonne, is rejected.
- December 25 – Jesse Lynch Williams' Why Marry?, the first drama to win a Pulitzer Prize, opens at the Astor Theatre (New York).
- unknown dates
  - The colonial government of the Dutch East Indies establishes the Kantoor voor de Volklectuur ("Office for People's Reading"), later renamed Balai Pustaka.
  - The Marc Chagall illustrated version of The Magician (דער קונצענמאכער, Der Kuntsenmakher) by I. L. Peretz (died 1915) appears in Vilnius.

== New books ==
=== Fiction ===
- Elizabeth von Arnim – Christine
- Mariano Azuela – Los caciques (The Bosses)
- Henri Barbusse – Under Fire (first English language edition)
- E. F. Benson
  - An Autumn Sowing
  - Mr. Teddy
- Adrien Bertrand – L'Orage sur le jardin de Candide (The thunderstorm in Candide's garden)
- Rhoda Broughton – A Thorn in the Flesh
- Edgar Rice Burroughs
  - A Princess of Mars
  - The Son of Tarzan
- Abraham Cahan – The Rise of David Levinsky
- Gilbert Cannan – The Stucco House
- Sarat Chandra Chattopadhyay – Devdas
- J. Storer Clouston – The Spy in Black
- Mary Cholmondeley – Under One Roof
- Joseph Conrad – The Shadow-Line (serialization concluded and in book form)
- Clemence Dane – Regiment of Women
- Miguel de Unamuno – Abel Sánchez
- Ethel M. Dell – The Hundredth Chance
- Norman Douglas – South Wind
- Arthur Conan Doyle – His Last Bow (collected Sherlock Holmes stories)
- Jeffrey Farnol – The Definite Object
- Edna Ferber – Fanny Herself
- Anna Katharine Green – The Mystery of the Hasty Arrow
- Zona Gale – A Daughter of the Morning
- Joseph Hergesheimer – The Three Black Pennys
- Robert Hichens – In the Wilderness
- Ricarda Huch – The Deruga Case (Der Fall Deruga)
- Henry James (died 1916)
  - The Ivory Tower
  - The Sense of the Past
- Gaston Leroux – Rouletabille at Krupp's
- Sinclair Lewis – The Job
- Jack London – Jerry of the Islands
- Oscar Micheaux – The Homesteader
- Christopher Morley – Parnassus on Wheels
- Baroness Orczy
  - Lord Tony's Wife
  - A Sheaf of Bluebells
- Frank L. Packard – The Adventures of Jimmie Dale
- David Graham Phillips – Susan Lenox: Her Rise and Fall
- Marmaduke Pickthall – Knights of Araby
- Ernest Poole – His Family
- Horacio Quiroga – Cuentos de amor de locura y de muerte
- Henry Handel Richardson (Et Florence Robertson) – Australia Felix (first part of The Fortunes of Richard Mahony)
- May Sinclair – The Tree of Heaven
- Annie M. P. Smithson – Her Irish Heritage
- Hermann Sudermann – The Excursion to Tilsit (Litauische Geschichten)
- Ivan Tavčar – Cvetje v jeseni (Flowers in Autumn)
- Edgar Wallace – The Secret House
- Robert Walser – Der Spaziergang (The Walk)
- Mary Augusta Ward
  - Missing
  - Towards the Goal
  - The War and Elizabeth
- Alec Waugh – The Loom of Youth
- Mary Webb – Gone to Earth
- Edith Wharton – Summer
- P. G. Wodehouse
  - The Man with Two Left Feet (collected stories)
  - Piccadilly Jim

=== Children and young people ===
- Lucy Maud Montgomery – Anne's House of Dreams
- Beatrix Potter – Appley Dapply's Nursery Rhymes
- Else Ury – Nesthäkchen and the World War

=== Drama ===
- Leonid Andreyev – The Life of Man
- Guillaume Apollinaire – The Breasts of Tiresias (Les mamelles de Tirésias, written 1903, first performed)
- Bruce Bairnsfather and Arthur Elliot – The Better 'Ole
- J. M. Barrie – Dear Brutus
- Dorothy Brandon – Wild Heather
- Ferdinand Bruckner – Der Herr in den Nebeln
- Hall Caine – The Woman Thou Gavest Me
- Gilbert Cannan – Everybody's Husband
- Jean Cocteau – Parade
- John Drinkwater – X = 0: A Night of the Trojan War
- John Galsworthy – Justice
- Mary P. Hamlin and George Arliss – Hamilton
- Georg Kaiser
  - The Burghers of Calais (Die Bürger von Calais, written 1913, first performed)
  - The Coral (Die Koralle)
  - From Morning to Midnight (Von Morgens bis Mitternachts, written 1912, first performed)
- Somerset Maugham – Our Betters
- A. A. Milne – Wurzel-Flummery
- Luigi Pirandello – Right You Are (if you think so)
- Gertrude Stein – An Exercise in Analysis
- Ridgely Torrence – Three Plays for a Negro Theater
- Brita von Horn – Kring drottningen
- Jesse Lynch Williams – Why Marry?

=== Poetry ===
Book by T. S. Eliot

- Lascelles Abercrombie – Emblems Of Love
- May Wedderburn Cannan – In War Time
- T. S. Eliot – Prufrock, and other observations
- Robert Graves – Fairies and Fusiliers
- Ivor Gurney – Severn and Somme
- James Weldon Johnson – Fifty Years and Other Poems
- Joseph Lee – Work-a-Day Warriors
- Edna St. Vincent Millay - Renascense and Other Poems
- Siegfried Sassoon – The Old Huntsman, and Other Poems
- Alan Seeger (killed in action 1916) – Poems (including "I have a rendezvous with Death")
- Edward Thomas (posthumously – killed in action April 9) – Poems (including "Adlestrop")
- William Watson – The Man Who Saw: and Other Poems Arising out of the War
- W. B. Yeats – The Wild Swans at Coole, Other Verses and a Play in Verse

=== Non-fiction ===
- G. K. Chesterton – A Short History of England
- Daniel Jones – An English Pronouncing Dictionary
- Henry Festing Jones – Samuel Butler, Author of Erewhon (1835–1902)
- Theodore Wesley Koch – Books in Camp, Trench and Hospital
- Rudolf Otto – The Idea of the Holy (Das Heilige)
- Alfred W. Pollard – Shakespeare's Fight with the Pirates and the Problems of the Transmission of His Text
- D'Arcy Wentworth Thompson – On Growth and Form
- Francis Brett Young – Marching on Tanga

== Births ==
- January 6 – Maeve Brennan, Irish-born short story writer and journalist (died 1993)
- February 11 – Sidney Sheldon, American novelist (died 2007)
- February 25 – Anthony Burgess, English novelist (died 1993)
- March 1 – Robert Lowell, American poet (died 1977)
- March 8 – Dimitrie Stelaru (Dumitru Petrescu), Romanian poet and novelist (died 1971)
- March 17 – Carlo Cassola, Italian novelist (died 1987)
- April 9 – Johannes Bobrowski, German author (died 1965)
- April 19 – Sven Hassel (Børge Pedersen), Danish novelist (died 2012)
- May 16 – Juan Rulfo, Mexican fiction writer (died 1986)
- June 7 – Gwendolyn Brooks, American poet (died 2000)
- June 13 – Augusto Roa Bastos, Paraguayan novelist (died 2005)
- June 16 – Katharine Graham, American journalist (died 2001)
- June 28 – A. E. Hotchner, American writer (died 2020)
- July 8 – J. F. Powers, American author (died 1999)
- July 15 – Robert Conquest, English-born historian and poet (died 2015)
- August 24 – Ruth Park, New Zealand children's writer (died 2010)
- October 5 – Magda Szabó, Hungarian novelist, dramatist and essayist (died 2007)
- October 24 – Denys Val Baker, Welsh writer (died 1984)
- October 31 – Patience Gray, English cookery and travel writer (died 2005)
- November 3 – Conor Cruise O'Brien, Irish biographer and political writer (died 2008)
- November 12 – Leila Berg, English children's author and education writer (died 2015)
- November 28 – Marni Hodgkin (Marion Rous), American children's book editor (died 2015)
- December 14 – Tove Ditlevsen, Danish poet and fiction writer (suicide 1976)
- December 16 – Sir Arthur C. Clarke, English fiction writer (died 2008)
- December 21
  - Diana Athill, English author and editor (died 2019)
  - Heinrich Böll, German Nobel Prize winning novelist (died 1985)
- December 27 – Onni Palaste, Finnish novelist (died 2009)
- date unknown – Fadwa Tuqan, Palestinian poet (died 2003)

== Deaths ==
- January 15 – William De Morgan, English novelist and potter (born 1839)
- January 18 – Andrew Murray, South African minister, writer and teacher (born 1828)
- January 20 – Agnes Leonard Hill, American author, journalist, enangelist, social reformer (born 1842)
- February – Emma Pike Ewing, American author and educator (born 1838)
- February 16 – Octave Mirbeau, French novelist and critic (born 1848)
- April 3 – Arthur Graeme West, English war poet and military writer (killed in action, born 1891)
- April 9
  - Edward Thomas, British poet and prose writer (killed in action, born 1878)
  - R. E. Vernède, English war poet (killed in action, born 1875)
- April 14 – L. L. Zamenhof, Polish creator of Esperanto (born 1859)
- April 17 – Jane Barlow, Irish novelist and poet (born 1856)
- April 21 – F. C. Burnand, English dramatist and editor (born 1836)
- May 13 – Gustav Jaeger, German naturalist (born 1832)
- June (date unknown) - Katharine Sarah Macquoid, British novelist and travel writer (born 1824)
- June 1 – Joseph Ashby-Sterry, English poet and comic writer (born 1836 or 1838)
- June 18 – Titu Maiorescu, Romanian culture critic, philosopher, and politician (born 1840)
- July 31
  - Francis Ledwidge, English war poet (killed in action, born 1887)
  - Hedd Wyn, Welsh-language poet (killed in action, born 1887)
- August 15 – Martha Capps Oliver, American poet and hymnwriter (born 1845)
- September 28 – T. E. Hulme, English critic (killed in action, born 1883)
- October 16 – Walter Flex, German author (died of wounds, born 1887)
- November 15 – Émile Durkheim, French sociologist (born 1858)
- November 16 – Georges de Peyrebrune, French novelist (born 1841)
- November 18 – Adrien Bertrand, French novelist (died of wounds, born 1888)
- December 27 – George Diamandy, Romanian journalist, dramatist, and political figure (angina, born 1867)

== Awards ==
- Nobel Prize for Literature: Karl Adolph Gjellerup, Henrik Pontoppidan

== See also ==
- World War I in literature
