= Mary (1931 film) =

1931 film

- 1931 German Film-Kurier magazine cover
- Directed by: Alfred Hitchcock
- Written by: Clemence Dane; Helen de Guerry Simpson; Alma Reville; Herbert Juttke; Georg C. Klaren
- Starring: Alfred Abel; Olga Chekhova
- Cinematography: Jack E. Cox
- Distributed by: British International Pictures (UK); Sud-Film (Germany)
- Release date: 2 March 1931
- Running time: 82 minutes
- Countries: Weimar Republic; United Kingdom
- Language: German

Mary (also known as Sir John Greift Ein!) is a 1931 British-German thriller film, directed by Alfred Hitchcock and starring Alfred Abel and Olga Chekhova. It is the German-language version of Hitchcock's Murder! (1930), shot simultaneously on the same sets with German-speaking actors. The film is based on the 1928 novel Enter Sir John by Clemence Dane and Helen Simpson. Miles Mander reprises his role as Gordon Druce from Murder!, though the character's name was changed to Gordon Moore.

== Plot ==
Mary Baring is a member of a touring acting troupe. When she is found one day with no memory next to the corpse of a colleague, all circumstances point to the fact that she committed the crime and she is tried for murder. Actor-manager Sir John Menier is the only juror who has doubts about her guilt to the end. However, he bows to pressure from the rest of the jury and finally votes guilty.

Driven by his guilty conscience, Sir John sets out on his own to find the real culprit. As it turns out he once met Mary when she applied to be an actress at his theater, but he turned her down. With two assistants, an acting couple from Mary's troupe, he investigates and comes across Handel Fane, an actor and acrobat with transvestite tendencies who was engaged to Mary. He was desperate to prevent Mary from learning his dark secret, namely his status as an escaped convict. When a colleague was about to tell Mary, Fane killed the colleague.

Since Sir John has no idea of this motive, but assumes that he is the perpetrator despite the lack of evidence, he wants to corner Fane. He lets him audition for a supposed new play. The text to be presented has clear references to the Mary Baring case. Fane panics and leaves Sir John's office. At a circus performance, which Sir John visits to question Fane again, after the end of his performance on the trapeze, he lifts the rope to descend, forms a noose which he puts around his neck and lets himself fall, hanging himself. He leaves a written confession testifying to Mary Baring's innocence. She is picked up from prison by Sir John in a car.

== Cast ==
- Alfred Abel as Sir John Menier
- Olga Chekhova as Mary Baring
- Paul Graetz as Bobby Brown
- Lotte Stein as Bebe Brown
- Hermine Sterler as Miss Miller
- Ekkehard Arendt as Handel Fane
- Miles Mander as Gordon Moore
- John Mylong as John Stuart

== Copyright status and home media ==
Mary is copyrighted worldwide but, like all British Hitchcocks, has been bootlegged on home video. Despite this, various official releases have appeared on DVD and Blu-ray from StudioCanal UK and Germany, Kino Lorber in the US, and Universal and Carlotta Films in France.
