= Cultural depictions of Alexander Hamilton =

Alexander Hamilton has appeared as a significant figure in popular works of historical fiction, including many that focused on other American political figures of his time. In comparison to other Founding Fathers, Hamilton attracted relatively little attention in American popular culture in the 20th century.

== Theatre ==
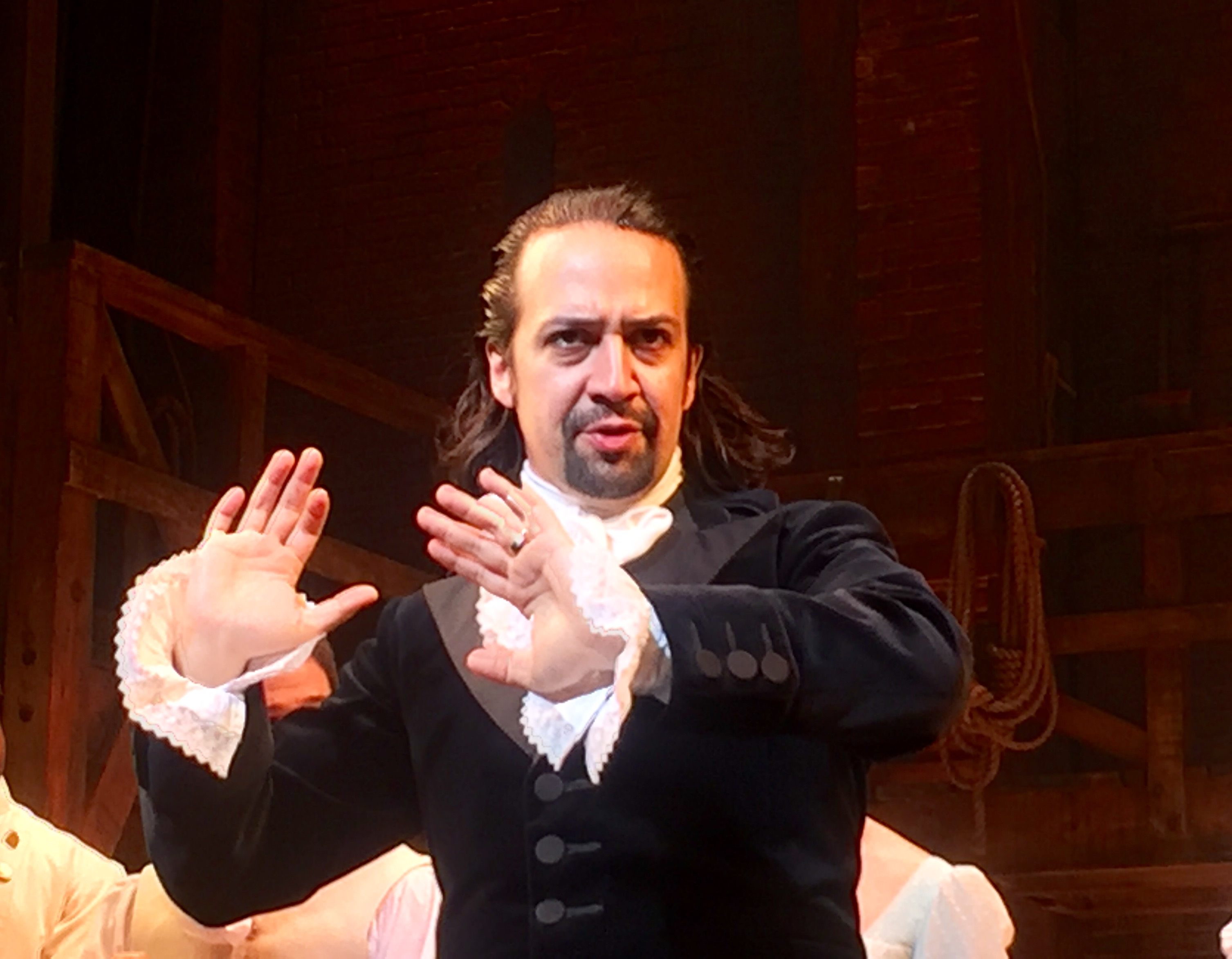
Lin-Manuel Miranda performing the title role in the 2015 musical Hamilton

- A stage play called Hamilton, which ran on Broadway in 1917, was co-written by George Arliss, who played the title role. Arliss reprised the role of Hamilton in a 1931 film based on the stage play.
- In 2015, Hamilton gained significant attention after the debut of the Broadway musical that bears his name. Lin-Manuel Miranda played the title role and wrote the musical based on a biography by Ron Chernow. The musical was described by The New Yorker as "an achievement of historical and cultural reimagining. In Miranda's telling, the headlong rise of one self-made immigrant becomes the story of America." The Off-Broadway production of Hamilton won the 2015 Drama Desk Award for Outstanding Musical as well as seven other Drama Desk Awards. In 2016, Hamilton received the Pulitzer Prize for Drama, and set a record with 16 Tony Award nominations, of which the show won 11, including Best Musical. During the presidency of Barack Obama, a plan to replace Hamilton on the ten-dollar bill was shelved due in part to the popularity of the musical. In 2016 the Broadway production was filmed. It was released on streaming service Disney+ in 2020.

== Literature ==
- Novelist Gertrude Atherton wrote a fictionalized biography, The Conqueror, Being the True and Romantic Story of Alexander Hamilton, published in 1902.
- Gore Vidal's 1973 historical novel Burr included Hamilton as a major character.
- L. Neil Smith cast Hamilton as a principal villain in the historical background of his 1980 libertarian alternative history novel The Probability Broach and its sequels in the North American Confederacy series.
- Davida Siwisa James explores four centuries of colonization, land divisions, and urban development around Hamilton Heights and Sugar Hill, the historic landmark neighborhood in West Harlem in her book Hamilton Heights and Sugar Hill: Alexander Hamilton’s Old Harlem Neighborhood Through the Centuries

== Television ==
- The 1976 PBS miniseries The Adams Chronicles featured Hamilton in a major recurring role.
- The 1986 television film George Washington II: The Forging of a Nation included Hamilton as a main character, portrayed by Richard Bekins.
- In the 2000 A&E television film The Crossing, Hamilton is played by Canadian actor Steven McCarthy and is portrayed memorably at the start of the Battle of Trenton.
- John Adams, a 2008 HBO miniseries in seven parts, featured Rufus Sewell as Hamilton in two episodes.
- Legends & Lies, a documentary series produced by Bill O'Reilly, featured Alexander McPherson as Hamilton in seven episodes that aired on Fox News in 2016.
- Turn: Washington's Spies, an AMC period drama, included Sean Haggerty in a recurring role as Hamilton in its final two seasons (2016–2017).
- In the American adaption of Ghosts, the main character Isaac Higgintoot has a feud with Hamilton throughout the series, with Nat Faxon playing Hamilton in the season 4 episode "Alexander Hamilton and the Ruffle Kerfuffle".

== Other ==
- The 1917 stage play was adapted into a film for Warner Brothers. Alexander Hamilton (1931), starred George Arliss in the title role.
- An organized group of faithless electors in the 2016 United States presidential election called themselves "Hamilton electors", seeking to link their efforts to Hamilton's Federalist No. 68.
