= Mona Williams =

Mona Williams may refer to:

- Mona Williams (writer, born 1905) (1905–1991), American writer
- Mona Williams (writer, born 1943), Guyanese-New Zealand writer
