= Re-enter Sir John =

1932 novel by Clemence Dane and Helen Simpson

- First edition
- Author: Clemence Dane; Helen Simpson
- Language: English
- Genre: Crime
- Publisher: Hodder & Stoughton
- Publication date: 1932
- Media type: Print
- Preceded by: Enter Sir John

Re-enter Sir John is a 1932 British crime novel written by Clemence Dane and Helen Simpson. It was the sequel to the 1928 novel Enter Sir John, which had been adapted into a film Murder! by Alfred Hitchcock. The book continues the adventures of the actor-manager Sir John Saumarez.

== Bibliography ==
- White, Terry. Justice Denoted: The Legal Thriller in American, British, and Continental Courtroom Literature. Praeger, 2003.
