= Monstrous Regiment =

Monstrous Regiment may refer to:

- The First Blast of the Trumpet Against the Monstruous Regiment of Women, a 1558 tract by John Knox.
- First Blast of the Trumpet Against the Monstruous Regiment of Women, a 1997 novel by Scottish-Canadian author Eric McCormack
- The Monstrous Regiment, a 1929 publication by Christopher Hollis
- The Monstrous Regiment, a 1990 science fiction novel by Storm Constantine
- A Monstrous Regiment of Women, a 1995 mystery novel by Laurie R. King
- Monstrous Regiment (novel), a 2003 Discworld novel by Terry Pratchett
- Monstrous Regiment Theatre Company, a British feminist theatre company that performed from 1975 to 1993

== See also ==
- Regiment of Women, a 1917 novel by Clemence Dane
- Regiment of Women (Berger novel), a 1973 novel by Thomas Berger
