= Under Capricorn (miniseries) =

- Genre: mini-series
- Written by: Tony Morphett
- Directed by: Rod Hardy
- Starring: Lisa Harrow; John Hallam; Peter Cousens
- Country of origin: Australia
- Original language: English
- No. of episodes: 2

Production
- Producer: Jock Blair
- Running time: 2 x 2 hours
- Budget: $2.3 million

Original release
- Network: Nine Network (Adelaide)
- Release: 1983 – 1983
- Network: Nine Network (Sydney)
- Release: 14 June 1984 – 1984

Under Capricorn is a 1983 Australian miniseries based on the novel by Helen Simpson. This had been filmed by Alfred Hitchcock in 1949.

It was financed by the South Australian Film Corporation.

== Cast ==
- Lisa Harrow as Lady Henrietta Flusky
- John Hallam as Samson Flusky
- Peter Cousens as Charles Adare
- Julia Blake as Milly
- Catherine Lynch as Susan Quaife
- Jim Holt as William Winter
