= Peter Cousens =

Australian actor (born 1965)

Peter Cousens AM
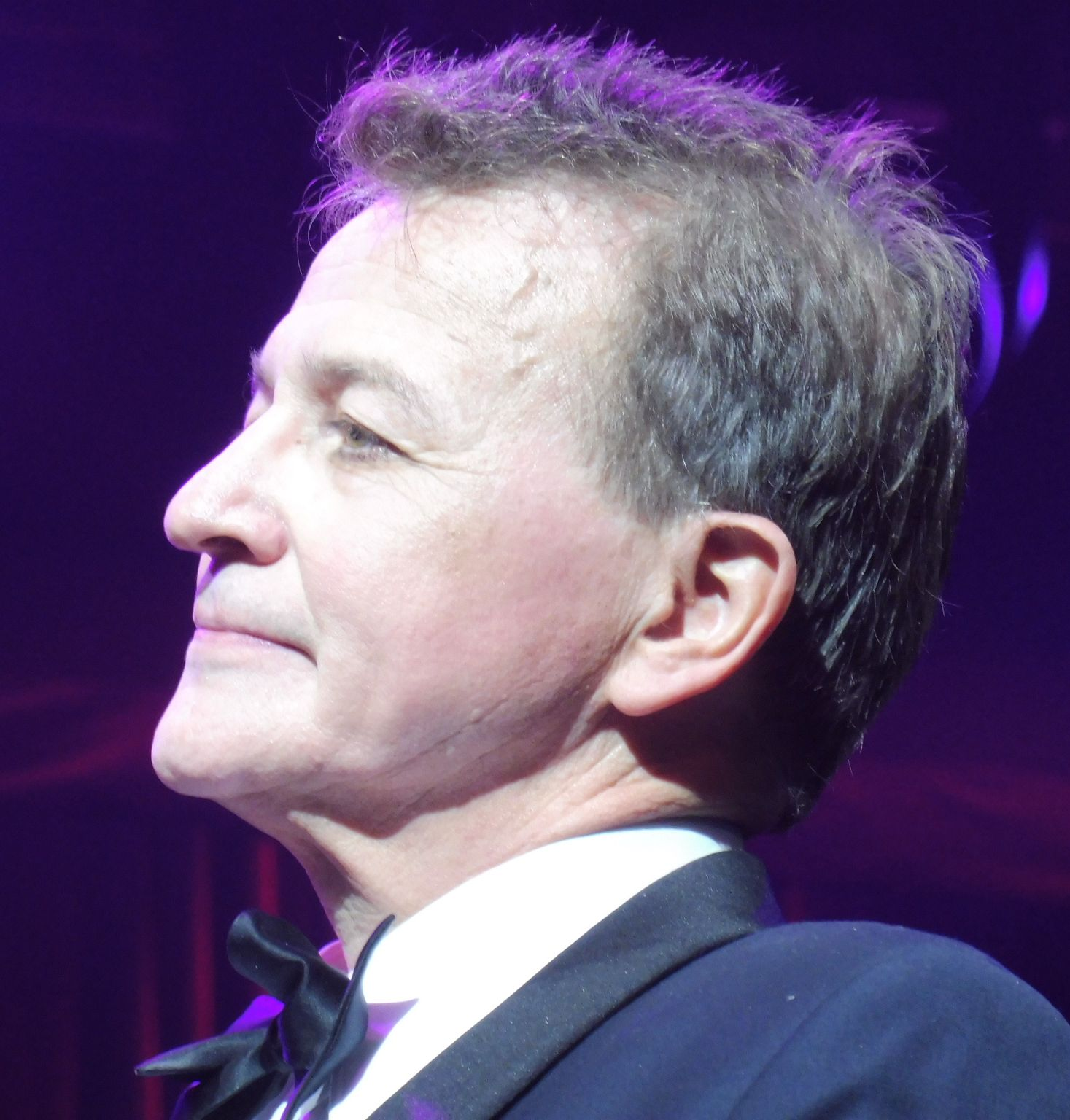
- Cousens in 2018
- Born: 2 November 1965 (age 60); Tamworth, New South Wales, Australia
- Occupation: Lawyer
- Years active: present
- Website: petercousens.com

Peter Cousens AM (born 2 November 1965) is an Australian actor and singer born in Tamworth, New South Wales. He is the former artistic director of the Talent Development Project. He attended The Armidale School in Armidale where he was Senior Prefect, and then Gordonstoun School, Scotland. He then spent a year reading Arts at St Paul's College, University of Sydney, before studying at the National Institute of Dramatic Art (NIDA) Cousens was appointed Companion of Central Queensland University in 2019 and a Member of the Order of Australia in the Queen's Birthday Honours in June 2019 for services to the performing arts and the community.

== Career ==
Cousens is the former artistic director of the Talent Development Project. He has worked in television, both as an actor and presenter. In the 1980s he guest starred in a number of major Australian television productions, including The Timeless Land, Earth Watch, The Sullivans, The Young Doctors, Sons and Daughters and The Restless Years. He then went on to take leading roles in Under Capricorn and Return to Eden.

Cousens is also known for his work in musical theatre. Major roles include The Phantom in London's West End production of The Phantom of the Opera; he also portrayed Marius in Les Misérables, Alex in Aspects of Love, Tony in West Side Story, Bobby in Company, Nanki Poo in The Mikado, Anthony Hope in Sweeney Todd: The Demon Barber of Fleet Street, and Chris in Miss Saigon in the Australian productions. Cousens appeared in the 2015 television opera The Divorce. He has received a number of Variety Club of Australia awards for his work.

Cousens has been featured on a number of cast albums, including as Chris on the International Symphonic Recording of Miss Saigon, and as Charles Makin on the original cast album for Australian musical The Hatpin.

In September 2006 he launched Kookaburra: The National Musical Theatre Company, a non-profit theatre company based in Australia, dedicated to musical theatre. The company closed in 2009.

In 2012–13, Cousens produced and directed the international feature film Freedom, starring Cuba Gooding Jr, William Sadler and Sharon Leal.

== Discography ==
=== Charting albums ===
List of albums, with Australian chart positions
Title	Album details	Peak chart positions
Title	Album details	AUS
Corner of the Sky	Released: April 1994; Format: CD, Cassette; Label: Akaba Records (AKABA-2)	32
From a Distance	Released: April 1996; Format: CD; Label: Polydor (531 622-2)	39
Are We Nearly There Yet? (with Noni Hazlehurst)	Released: 1997; Format: CD; Label: Medical Benefits Fund of Australia Limited (MBF001)	–
Are We There Already? (with Noni Hazlehurst)	Released: 1997; Format: CD; Label: Medical Benefits Fund of Australia Limited (MBF002)	–
A Life on Earth	Released: 2014; Format: CD; Label: Peter Cousens	–
Love Changes Everything	Released: October 2014; Format: Digital; Label: Peter Cousens	–
Evening Star (with Jane Rutter)	Released: December 2019; Format: Digital; Label: Jane Rutter	–
