= Mona Williams (writer, born 1905) =

American novelist (1905–1991)

- Born: Vermona March Goodwyn; March 26, 1905; Rutland, Vermont, U.S.
- Died: December 5, 1991 (aged 86); Monterey, California, U.S.
- Occupations: Novelist, poet
- Spouse: Henry Meade Williams (1929–1952) (divorce) (3 children)
- Relatives: Jesse Lynch Williams (father-in-law)
- Writing career
- Pen name: Mona Goodwyn, Mona March Goodwyn, Mona Goodwyn Williams
- Period: 1928–1978
- Genres: Romance, women's fiction

Mona Williams (born Vermona March Goodwyn; March 26, 1905 – December 5, 1991) was an American novelist and poet, best known as the author of the novelette from which the 1954 feature film, Woman's World, was adapted. She also contributed articles, fiction and poetry to magazines including The Writer, McCall's, Ladies Home Journal and Cosmopolitan.

== Early life ==
Mona Williams was born in Rutland, Vermont, the first of five children born to Wirt Goodwyn and Mabel Alice Trask. She was raised in Massachusetts, initially Springfield and later Northampton, where she attended private school.

== Career ==
Williams's first novel Here Are My Children was generally well received. Novelist Julian Street judged it "quite a surprising performance for so young a writer," while poet Isidor Schneider, reviewing the book for the New York Herald Tribune, observed:

The breaking up of a unified family, always to be foreseen, but nevertheless painful for that, is rendered with delicate insight and fine honest feeling. [A central character's] death toward the end is not so much tragic in itself as an effective device for precipitating the solutions of the problems of others. And the solution is an intelligent one, artistically and emotionally satisfying.

For much of her career, William's star was eclipsed by that of her celebrated namesake, Mrs. Harrison Williams (the former Mona Bush, née Strader), most notably in 1937 when her work was erroneously attributed by no less prestigious a publication than Time Magazine:

A rare flower of U.S. wealth is Mona Strader Schlesinger Bush Williams, better known as Mrs. Harrison Williams, "best-dressed woman in the world." [...] Since being given her title by a group of cold-blooded couturiers four years ago she has become the world's most photographed non-professional mannequin. In time spared from Society she has written a clever novel (Bright Is the Morning, 1934)....

In 1952, 20th Century Fox purchased Williams' story, May the Best Wife Win, originally published in the July 1950 issue of McCall's.

Whatever boost to Williams' public profile may have resulted from her connection to the 1954 feature film Woman's World appears to have been largely offset by the studio's decision to relocate the film's action to New York City. As she herself noted:

There's been so much mention of Lindsay and Crouse and the million dollar cast, without any mention of me, that I feel rather like a woman whose baby has been adopted by rich relatives. I visited the studio and met some of the stars. They were so colorful—real, approachable people—and seemed to be having such a good time that I feel happier.

In the nineteen sixties, two more projected screen adaptations of Williams novels were announced, neither of which came to fruition. In 1963, MGM purchased the rights to Williams' not-yet completed novel, The Company Girls, with Joe Pasternak to produce and screenwriter George Wells to do the adaptation. Whether or not that adaptation was completed, the film was never made. In the summer of 1965, it was reported that former film writer-producer Felix Jackson had acquired the rights to Williams's novel Faces at a Window, with Jackson himself slotted to do the adaptation. No more was heard of the project, nor was any novel of that name published, though perhaps this was the novel eventually published in 1968 as Voices in the Dark.

== Personal life and death ==
In December 1929, roughly six years after having had her first completed novel rejected by him, Mona Goodwyn married editor, publisher and author Henry Meade Williams (the son of novelist and playwright Jesse Lynch Williams), with whom she had three children.

Williams died of a stroke on December 5, 1991, at Community Hospital of the Monterey Peninsula, having been predeceased by her husband in 1984. Her cremated remains were scattered in the waters off Trout Island, near Harrington, Maine, as had been her husband's.

== List of works ==
- Here Are My Children (1932)
- Bright Is the Morning (1934)
- May the Best Wife Win (1950)
- "The Man With Three Faces" (1951)
- Dream Pictures (1952)
- Invitation to Breakfast: A Comedy in One Act (1955)
- Yesterday's Innocents (1956)
- The Marriage (1958; a.k.a. The Passion of Amy Styron, 1965)
- The Hot Breath of Heaven (1961), poems
- The Company Girls (1965)
- Celia (1968)
- Voices in the Dark (1968)
- The Messenger (1977)
- This House Is Burning (1978)
