= The Hatpin =

- Original cast recording cover
- Music: Peter Rutherford
- Lyrics: James Millar
- Book: James Millar
- Productions: 2008 Sydney; 2008 NYMF; 2011 Melbourne; 2012 London; 2014 South Perth; 2016 Hobart; 2018 Brisbane

The Hatpin is a musical by James Millar (book and lyrics) and Peter Rutherford (composer). It was inspired by the true story of Amber Murray who in 1892 gave up her son to the Makin family in Sydney, Australia. Written and developed in 2006–2007, The Hatpin opened at the York Theatre, Seymour Centre in Sydney on 27 February 2008 and ran for 13 shows. The musical has received subsequent productions in Australia, the United Kingdom, and the United States.

The Hatpin is included in the hardback, The Australian Musical: From the beginning (2019), on pages 251 and 252., and includes details of the 2008 premiere in Sydney and US premiere at the New York Musical Theatre Festival, the 2010 showcase and 2011 Victorian premiere in Melbourne, the 2012 London premiere, the 2014 Western Australian premiere in Perth, and the 2018 Queensland premiere in Brisbane.

== Synopsis ==
The Hatpin is based on a series of infanticides committed in Sydney in 1892, and is the true story of a single mother, Amber Murray, who advertised her baby in a newspaper trading column in the hope of saving his life. The baby farmers John and Sarah Makin (renamed Agatha and Charles for the show) had taken her child, Horace, in return for regular support payments, but had in fact murdered him. The evil couple are eventually arrested and tried for the murder of several infants, leading to one of the most moving criminal trials in Australian history. Using the moral support she gains from her friendship with the free-spirited Harriet Piper, Amber fights the injustices of circumstance and tragedy to find hope, strength, and justice for her son Horace.

== Productions ==
The original Australian production of The Hatpin opened at the York Theatre, Seymour Centre in Sydney on 27 February 2008, produced by Neil Gooding Productions and White Box Theatre. There were 13 performances in total and it starred Melle Stewart, Peter Cousens, Michelle Doake, Gemma-Ashley Kaplan, Caroline O'Connor and Barry Crocker.

The Hatpin made its US premiere on 15 September 2008 with 6 performances at the American Theatre of Actors in the Chernuchin Theatre as a participant of the New York Musical Theatre Festival. Caroline O'Connor and Gemma-Ashley Kaplan followed The Hatpin overseas to reprise their roles as Harriet Piper and Clara Makin. Gemma-Ashley Kaplan later played the role of Amber Murray in the 2011 Melbourne premiere.

Magnormos showcased The Hatpin at the Comedy Theatre, Melbourne as part of OzMade Musicals 2010, and in 2011 presented the Melbourne premiere at Theatre Works, St. Kilda, with an 8 performance season from 16 to 28 May. It was directed by Shaun Kingma with musical direction by Sophie Thomas.

The musical received a London fringe production (24 performances) from 30 October to 24 November 2012 at the Blue Elephant Theatre, in a Heather Doole, Blue Elephant & Greenwich Theatre co-production in association with Lazarus Theatre. Additional cast members Ziggie Sky Ward, Grace Lewis, Elly Lowney, and Linda Taimre appeared as Abigail Holt, Sarah McFarland, Elizabeth Hope, and Mary Edwards, respectively.

The West Australian premiere of The Hatpin took place at South Perth's Old Mill Theatre with 10 performances from 11 July to 20 July 2014. Tim Prosser, Nicholas Cruse, Mitchell Crouch, David Cosgrove, and Luke Heath all appeared in minor roles.

The Tasmanian premiere of The Hatpin was presented by Bijou Creative in 2016 at the Peacock Theatre, Salamanca Arts Centre, Hobart from 17 to 26 March. This production was co-directed by Charlea Edwards and Karen Kluss.

In 2018, The Hatpin had its Queensland premiere with Oz Theatricals at the Spring Hill Reservoirs near The Old Windmill, Brisbane, with a 5 performance season from 20 to 23 September. It was directed by David Harrison with musical direction by Julie Whiting, costume design by Erin Tribble, and choreography by Lauren Lee Innis-Youren.

== Roles and principal casts ==
Character	Sydney (2008)	USA (2008)	Melbourne (2011)	London (2012)	South Perth (2014)	Hobart (2016)	Brisbane (2018)
Amber Murray	Melle Stewart	Alexis Fishman	Gemma-Ashley Kaplan	Gemma Beaton	Sarah Cosstick	Grace Ovens	Lara Boyle
Harriet Piper	Caroline O'Connor	Caroline O'Connor	Samantha Morley	Eleanor Sandars	Judi Johnson	Nicole Farrow	Carly Quinn
Agatha Makin	Michelle Deake	Cyrilla Baer Pond	Sophie Collins	Kate Playdon	Andrea von Bertouch	Anna Kidd	Fiona Buchanan
Clara Makin	Gemma-Ashley Kaplan	Gemma-Ashley Kaplan	Emma Jones	Emma White	Madeleine Shaw	Cassie Ogle	Tyallah Bullock
Charles Makin	Peter Cousens	Paul Kandel	Philip Gould	Robin Holden	Angelino Schintu	Jeff Keogh	Chris Kellett
Edward Cleary	Tyran Parke	Matt Leisy	Jacob Cook	Mark Byles	Unknown	Unknown	Christopher Batkin
James Hanoney / Justice Stephen	Barry Crocker	Michael A. Pizzi	Martin Lane	Hayward Morse	Adam Salathiel	Unknown	Valdemar Jakobsen
Minnie Davies	Jennifer Peers	Mary Catherine McDonald	Megan Hoult	Michaela Cartmell	Unknown	Unknown	Samantha LeClaire
Marianne Leonard	Octavia Barron-Martin	Casey Erin Clark	Montana Perrin	Katie Allison	Unknown	Unknown	Shelise Vandal
Rebecca Rigby	Jodie Harris	Sharone Halevy	Kimberley Colman	Elise Fabris	Unknown	Unknown	Sophia Dimopoulos
Thomas Williamson / James Joyce	Nick Christo	Billy Clark Taylor	Adam Rafferty	Tom Bristow	Unknown	Unknown	Tristan Ham

== Musical numbers ==
Act 1

- "Hymn" – Cast
- "Twisted Little Town" – Cast
- "Puddles" – Amber Murray
- "Holding You" – Amber Murray
- "Work" – Amber Murray and Cast
- "Bad Fruit" – Harriet Piper and Amber Murray
- "Knock Knock Knock" – Cast
- "Enough" – Amber Murray
- "Knock Knock Knock (Reprise)" – Cast
- "Gathering Sirens" – Minnie Davies, Marianne Leonard, Rebecca Rigby, and The Makins
- "Steal Away" – Charlie and Agatha Makin
- "Underscore / Twisted Little Town (Reprise)" – Minnie Davies, Marianne Leonard and Rebecca Rigby
- "The Hand of Courage" – Harriet Piper and Amber Murray
- "Digging Up" – James Hanoney and Cast

Act 2

- "Holding You (Reprise)" – Amber Murray
- "So Much More Than Me" – Amber Murray
- "Why Did I Give Him Away?" – Amber Murray, Minnie Davies, Marianne Leonard and Rebecca Rigby
- "Headline (2)" – Cast (Press Agents)
- "Sail" – Harriet Piper and Clara Makin
- "Something Like Being a Mother" – Harriet Piper
- "Natural Causes" – Thomas Williamson, Charlie and Agatha Makin and Press Agents
- "Headline (3)" – Press Agents
- "The Hatpin" – Clara Makin
- "The Verdict" – Cast and Justice Stephen
- "Finale: Tiny Glow / Sail (Reprise)" – Cast

== Recording ==
An original cast album was released in 2008 by Neil Gooding Productions.

=== Track listing ===
All tracks are written by Peter Rutherford.

No.	Title	Performer(s)	Length
1.	"Overture"	The Hatpin Orchestra	3:41
2.	"Hymn"	The Hatpin Cast	1:01
3.	"Twisted Little Town"	The Hatpin Cast	3:44
4.	"Puddles"	Melle Stewart (as Amber Murray)	3:50
5.	"Work"	The Hatpin Cast & Caroline O'Connor (as Harriet Piper)	5:57
6.	"Bad Fruit"	Caroline O'Connor & Melle Stewart	3:06
7.	"Knock Knock Knock"	The Hatpin Cast	2:52
8.	"Enough"	Melle Stewart	2:12
9.	"Gathering Sirens"	The Hatpin Cast & Melle Stewart	4:39
10.	"Steal Away"	Peter Cousens (as Charlie Makin)	3:23
11.	"The Hand of Courage"	Caroline O'Connor & Melle Stewart	3:55
12.	"These Things"	The Hatpin Cast	2:05
13.	"Digging Up"	The Hatpin Cast & Barry Crocker (as James Hanoney)	2:39
14.	"So Much More Than Me"	Melle Stewart	4:13
15.	"Why Did I Give Him Away?"	The Hatpin Cast & Melle Stewart	2:39
16.	"Sail"	Caroline O'Connor & Gemma-Ashley Kaplan (as Clara Makin)	1:58
17.	"Something Like Being a Mother"	Caroline O'Connor	2:52
18.	"Natural Causes"	The Hatpin Cast	3:00
19.	"The Hatpin"	Gemma-Ashley Kaplan	5:45
20.	"The Verdict"	The Hatpin Cast & Barry Crocker (as Justice Stephen)	2:16
21.	"Holding You"	Caroline O'Connor & Melle Stewart	4:57
22.	"A Tiny Glow / Sail (Reprise)"	The Hatpin Cast	3:19

== Awards and nominations ==
- 2008 Sydney Theatre Awards
  - Best New Australian Work – Peter Rutherford and James Millar (nominee)
  - Judith Johnson Award for Best Performance by an Actress in a Musical – Michelle Doake (winner)
  - Judith Johnson Award for Best Performance by an Actress in a Musical – Gemma-Ashley Kaplan (nominee)
- 2011 Melbourne Green Room Awards
  - Best Female Artist in a Featured Role (Music Theatre) – Emma Jones (winner)
- 2018 Matilda Awards
  - Best Female Actor in a Supporting Role – Carly Quinn (nominee)
  - Bille Brown Award – Best Emerging Artist – Carly Quinn (winner)
