= Henry Meade Williams =

American writer, publisher, bookstore owner

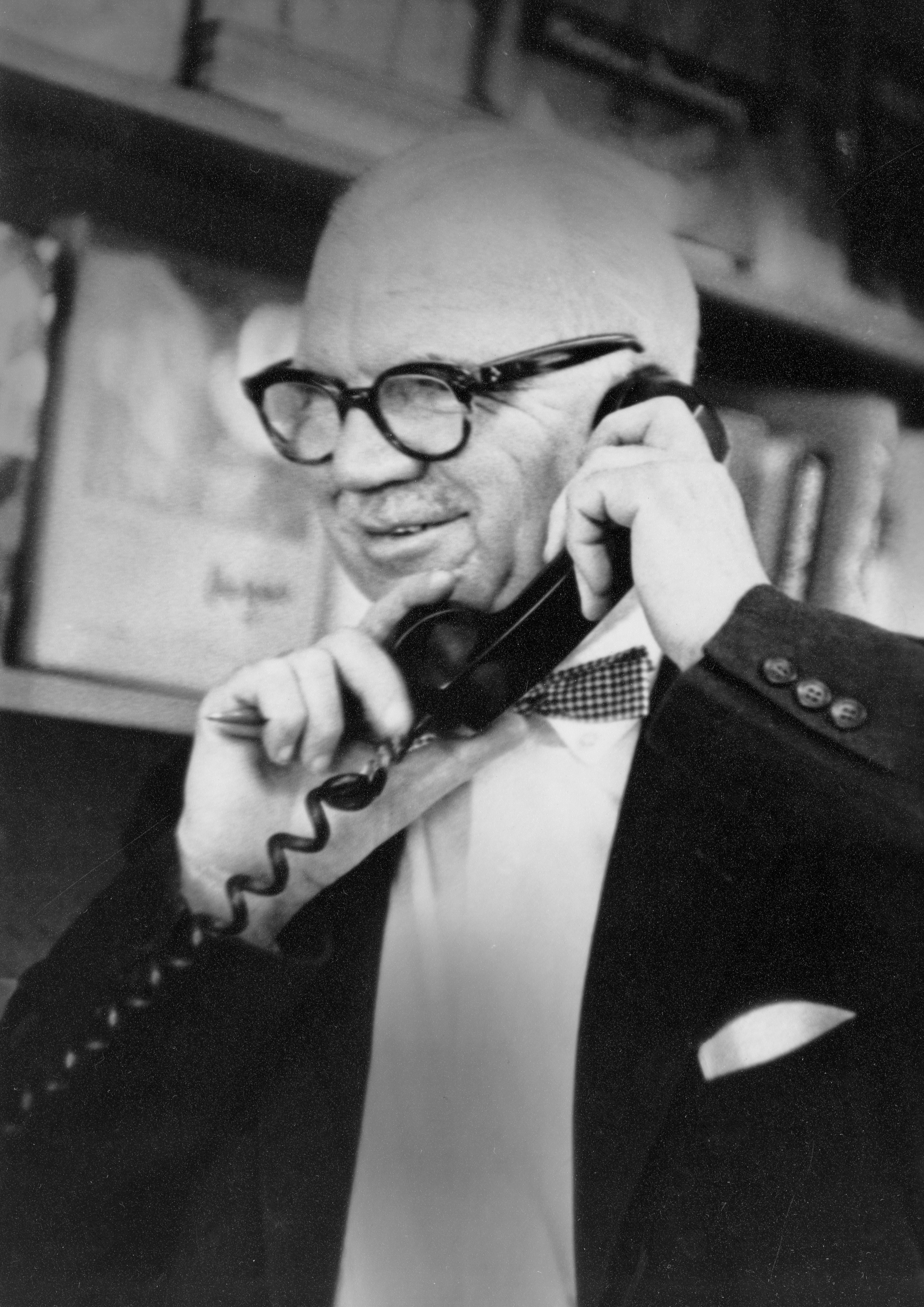
- Meade Williams (1899–1984)
- Born: May 1, 1899; New York City, New York
- Died: 24 April 1984 (aged 84); Monterey, California, US
- Occupation(s): Writer, publisher
- Spouses: Mary McIntosh (m. 1923; div. 1929) Mona Goodwyn (m. 1929)

Henry Meade Williams (May 1, 1899 – April 24, 1984) was an American writer, editor, publisher, and bookstore owner in Carmel-by-the-Sea, California. The Henry Meade Williams Local History Room of the Harrison Memorial Library honors his name.

== Early life ==
Williams was a son of writer Jesse Lynch Williams. During World War I he enlisted in the United States Navy at the age of 17 and was stationed at New London, Connecticut State Pier. After the war he went to Texas to work in the oil fields as a driller for a year.

== Professional background ==
In 1925, he wrote the story Tides about the rocky coast of Maine. In 1927, he wrote an illustrated book Robin Hood. While working for the American Magazine, he wrote Victory, a short story that appeared in the Vanity Fair in October 1935.

In 1936, during the Great Depression in the United States, Williams moved with his family to Carmel-by-the-Sea, California, where he and his wife continued their writing careers. His wife Mona, wrote several books, including: Here are my children, (1932), Bright is the morning, (1935) Dream pictures, (1952) The Hot Breath of Heaven. (1961), and others.

== Legacy ==
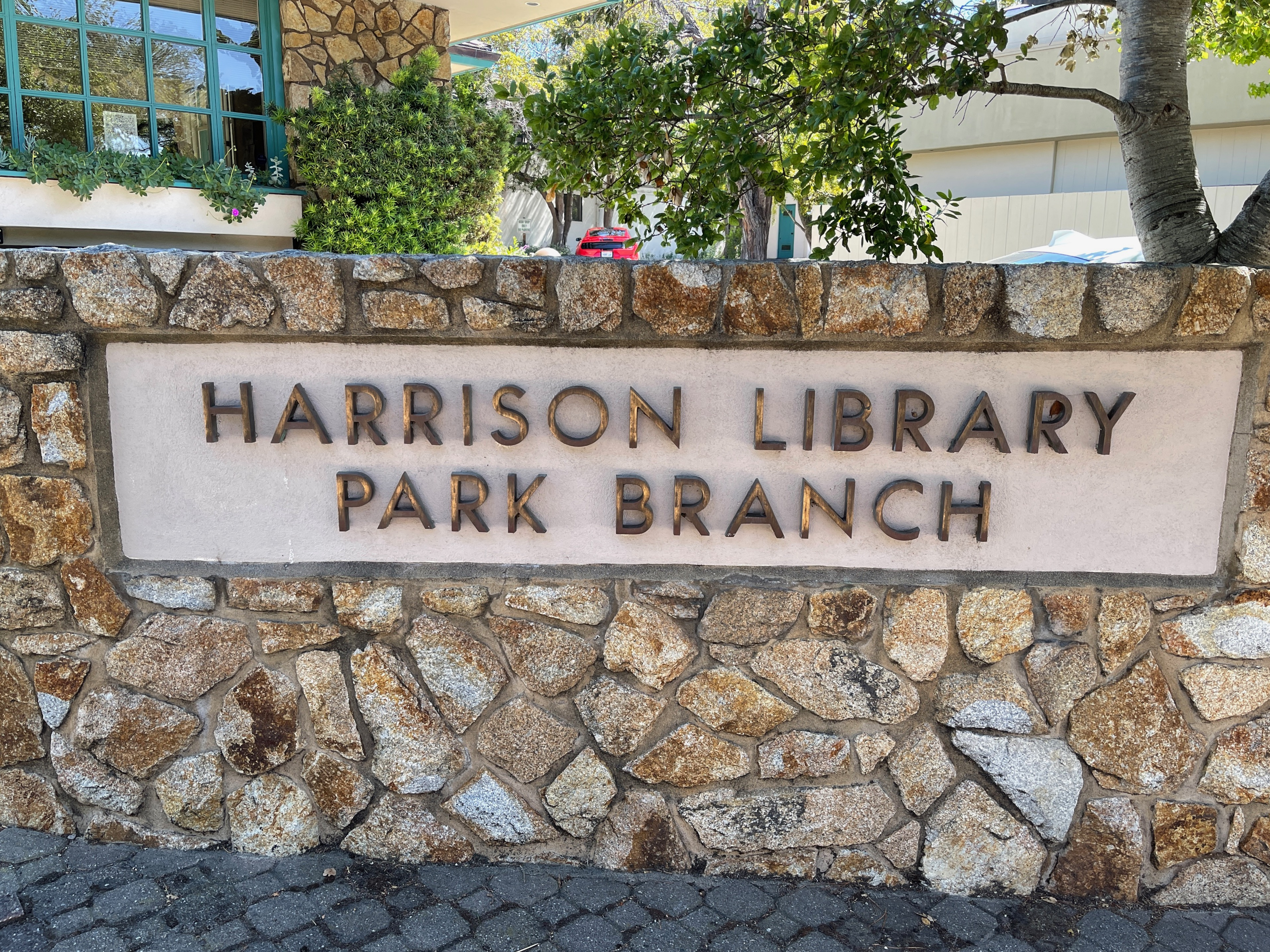
Harrison Library Park Branch

The Park Branch library features the Henry Meade Williams Lecture Series, that are lectures on the history of Mary Austin, Robinson Jeffers, Theatre of the Golden Bough, and more. The lobby of the Park Branch includes a display case with exhibits about these lectures.

== See also ==
- Timeline of Carmel-by-the-Sea, California
