= Eighty in the Shade =

1958 play

- Written by: Clemence Dane
- Original language: English
- Genre: Drama

Premiere
- Date premiered: 24 November 1958
- Place premiered: Theatre Royal, Newcastle

Eighty in the Shade is a 1958 play by the British writer Clemence Dane. It was her final play and was written as a vehicle for her friend Sybil Thorndike who played a famous stage actress celebrating fifty years on the stage while confronting family problems.

It premiered at the Theatre Royal, Newcastle before transferring to the Globe Theatre in London's West End where it ran for 179 performances between 8 January and 13 June 1959. As well as Thorndike the cast included Lewis Casson, Robert Flemyng, Mary Peach and Valerie Taylor.

== Bibliography ==
- Wearing, J.P. The London Stage 1950-1959: A Calendar of Productions, Performers, and Personnel. Rowman & Littlefield, 2014.
