= Mary P. Hamlin =

American dramatist

- Born: Mary Ida Parmele; September 30, 1871; West Bloomfield, New York, U.S.
- Died: June 26, 1964 (aged 92); Canandaigua, New York, U.S.
- Education: Granger Place School for Girls; Vassar College
- Occupation: Playwright
- Writing career
- Language: English
- Genres: Biography; religious drama
- Notable works: Hamilton, Alexander Hamilton

Mary P. Hamlin (born Mary Ida Parmele; September 30, 1871 (Note: Both of the published Hamlin obituaries—that of the Democrat and Chronicle and of the Daily Messenger—give 93, rather than 92, as Hamlin's age at time of death, despite simultaneously giving September 30, 1871 as her date of birth. That said, given the fact that both 1875 and 1900 census forms for the Parmele family give ages—3 and 28, respectively—consistent with said date of birth, it seems prudent to conclude that, for whatever reason, the obituaries got the date right and the age wrong, and that Mary P. Hamlin was indeed born on September 30, 1871.) – June 26, 1964) was an American playwright specializing in religious dramas, but best known for the 1917 Broadway play, Hamilton (co-authored with its star, George Arliss), and for its 1931 screen adaptation, Alexander Hamilton.

== Early life and career ==
A native of West Bloomfield, New York, Hamlin was one of four children born to Hiram Taft Parmele and Mary Gates. By no later than 1875, the family had relocated to Canandaigua. There, she attended the Granger Place School for Girls, class of 1892. Following her graduation from Vassar College in 1896, she returned to teach at Granger Place, where she soon became head of the English department. Writing in 1910, for Good Housekeeping Magazine, Hamlin recalled an early role model. "Miss Lucy Salmon, the head of the history department at Vassar College, has, I think, the greatest intellectual force of any woman with whom it has ever been my good fortune to come into contact. She has a mind of piercing, needle-point fineness and great breadth of grasp. I think she never had a vague or slip-shod thought in her life." Following a detailed rundown of how, exactly, this intellect was manifested in Salmon's kitchen, Hamlin concludes,

In other words, there was a place, and a reason for the place, of everything in that kitchen. Everything was planned to save steps. [...] Here, again, a large mind had been applied to small things, with practical results.

On July 29, 1916, Hamlin copyrighted a three-act play of 193 pages, entitled The Secretary of the Treasury. However, there does not appear to be a single, subsequent in-print mention of any such Hamlin play, much less any performance or publication thereof. Taking into account both that and the fact that "Secretary of the Treasury" is the office held by the title character of the 1917, four-act play, Hamilton it seems more than likely that Hamilton was simply the 1916 work's final draft; retitled, newly partitioned, and—to a now unquantifiable extent—otherwise revised.

As for Arliss's contribution to the final version, despite the tenor of contemporaneous news stories (many of which failed to even mention Hamlin's name, simply crediting Arliss), at least one paper, the Detroit Free Press, attributed the play's authorship in terms—specifically, "by Mrs. Mary P. Hamlin, with suggestions from Mr. Arliss himself"—roughly comparable to those used by Hamlin in her 1953 memoirs, as quoted by the New York Post in 2016. "Mr. Arliss did little writing of my play. He knew nothing of American politics, did not even know, at first, that Thomas Jefferson was president of the United States." To his credit, as Hamlin later notes, Arliss always insisted that she be the primary credited author, and indignantly demanded as much when the play's initial batch of printed programs had that order reversed. Although Hamlin never specifies the nature of his contributions, she clearly appreciated them.

As I worked on the play with George Arliss, I began to realize what a lifetime of experience amounted to. He was putting his knowledge into my play, even if I did the writing. His suggestions were invaluable but he never wanted me to agree to anything I did not understand. When I told him I was willing to accept his experience whether or not I understood it, he said firmly, 'No. This is your play and nothing must go into it that you do not understand.'

In July 1943, it was widely reported that Otto Preminger had purchased the rights to Hamlin's Benjamin Franklin, with the intention of staging the play on Broadway that fall, contingent on the availability of Sidney Greenstreet. However, despite lingering coverage as late as December, Greenstreet's requested leave of absence from Warner Brothers failed to materialize, as did, evidently, did any Plan B on Preminger's part.

== Personal life and death ==
From September 16, 1902 until her death on November 11, 1947, Hamlin was married to George Wright Hamlin, a Canandaigua-based attorney who would later succeed his father as president of the Canandaigua National Bank and Trust Company.

On June 26, 1964 (following roughly three years of being confined to her bed due to a hip fracture suffered in 1901), Hamlin died of undisclosed causes at her home on 107 Howell Street in Canandaigua. Predeceased by her husband and daughter, she was survived by three sons, nine grandchildren and seven grandchildren. Following the funeral service, conducted on June 28 at Canandaigua's Congregational Church, Hamlin's remains were buried at Woodlawn Cemetery.

== Works ==
- "The Beauty of the House Is Order". Good Housekeeping. December 1910. Vol. 51, Iss. 6. pp. 692–696.
- The Secretary of the Treasury, 1916
- Hamilton, 1917
- The Style's the Thing; A Vaudeville Sketch for Four People, 1919
- The Efficiency Mother-in-Law; A Play in One Act for One Man and Four Women, 1919
- The Rock (a.k.a. Simon the Rock and Peter the Rock), 1921
- He Came Seeing, 1928
- The Trouble with Christmas Presents, 1930
- Burnt Offering, 1933
- The Separatist, 1934
- Certain Greeks, 1935
- The Pattern in the Mountain: A Play with a Prologue and Three Acts, 1937
- The Wee Bit Seed, 1949
