= Jardin des Arômes =

Botanical garden in Rhône-Alpes, France

Coordinates: 44.3555°N 5.1343°E

The Jardin des Arômes is a botanical garden specializing in aromatic plants, located along the Promenade de la Digue, Nyons, Drôme, Rhône-Alpes, France. It is open daily; admission is free.

The garden was created in 1983 on the banks of the river Eygues, and now contains about 200 types of aromatic and medicinal plants, including cedar, Cercis siliquastrum, chestnut, cypress, juniper, olive trees, pine, and rosemary, thyme, and viburnum. It is now in a state of neglect.

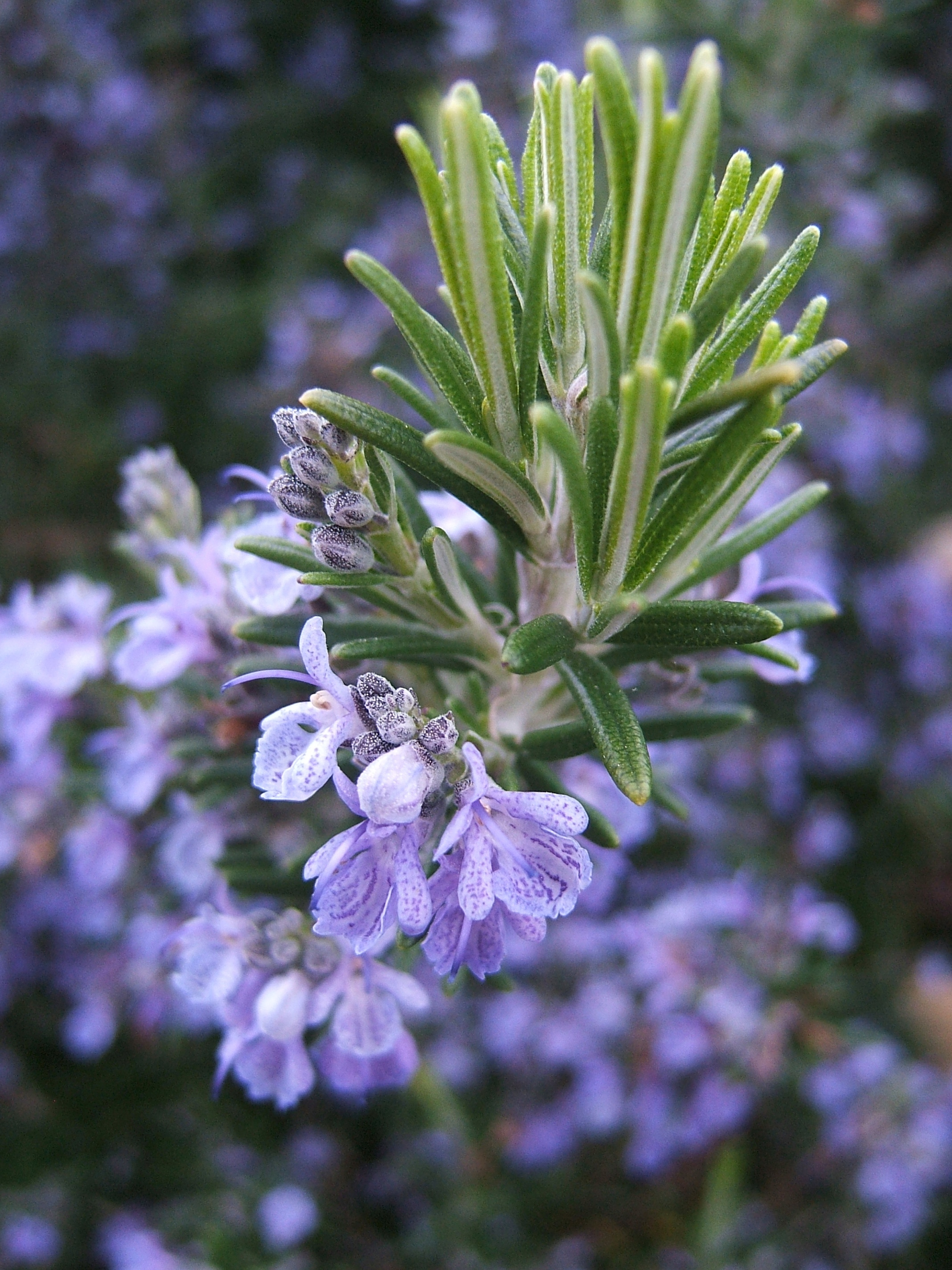
Jardin des Arômes

== See also ==
- List of botanical gardens in France
