= Nyons =

Nyons Niòns (Occitan)
- Subprefecture and commune
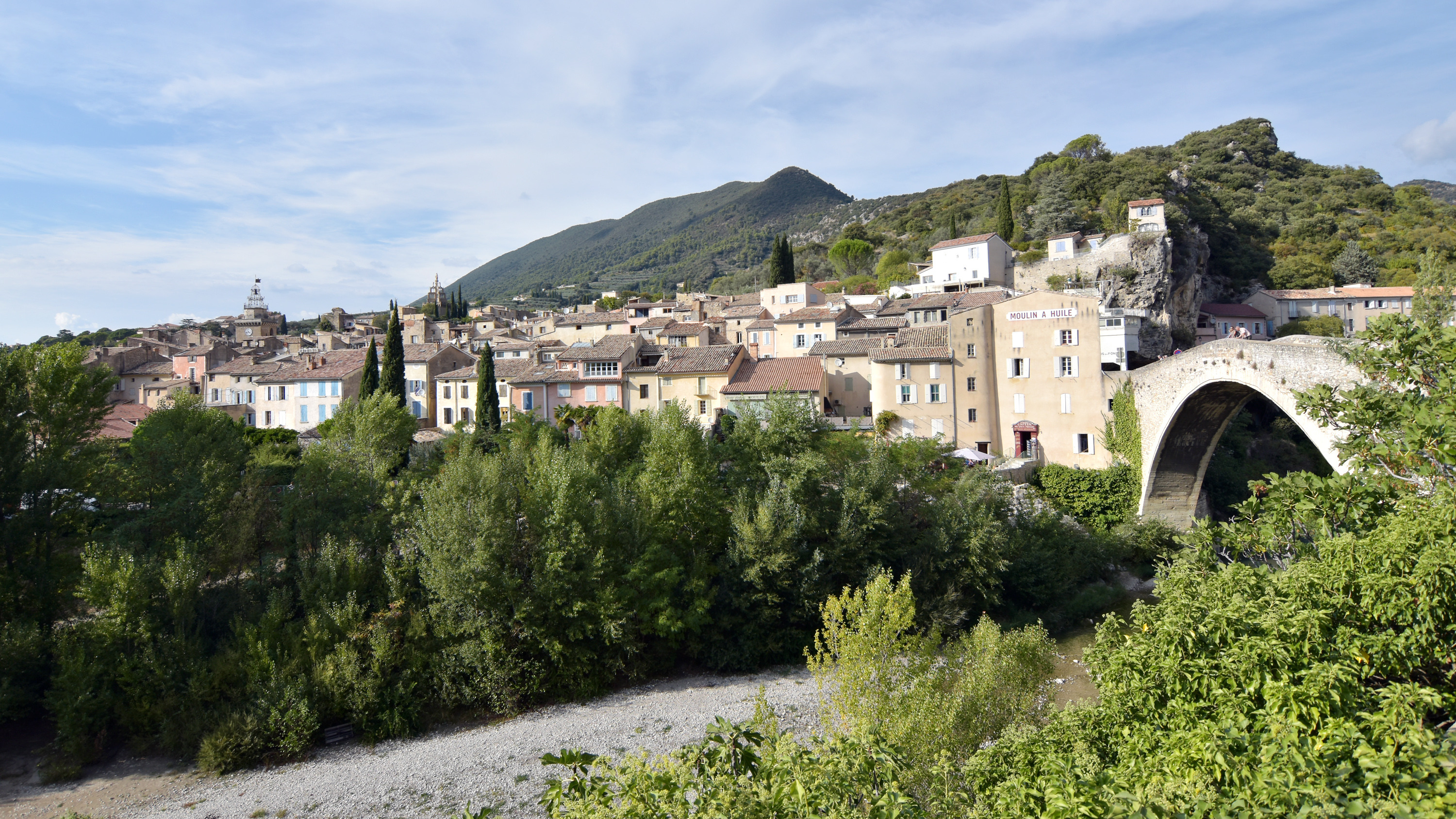
- A general view of Nyons

- Coat of arms
- Location of Nyons
- Location within France Location within Auvergne-Rhône-Alpes
- Coordinates: 44°21′37″N 5°08′23″E
- Country: France
- Region: Auvergne-Rhône-Alpes
- Department: Drôme
- Arrondissement: Nyons
- Canton: Nyons et Baronnies
- Intercommunality: CC des Baronnies en Drôme provençale

Government
  - Mayor (2020–2026): Pierre Combes
- Area^{1}: 23.45 km^{2} (9.05 sq mi)
- Elevation: 270 m (890 ft)
- Highest elevation: 940 m (3,080 ft)
- Lowest elevation: 234 m (768 ft)
- Population (2023): 6,816
  - Density: 290.7/km^{2} (752.8/sq mi)
- Demonym: Nyonsais
- Time zone: UTC+01:00 (CET)
  - Summer (DST): UTC+02:00 (CEST)
- INSEE/Postal code: 26220 /26110
- Website: www.nyons.com
- ^{1} French Land Register data, which excludes lakes, ponds, glaciers > 1 km^{2} (0.386 sq mi or 247 acres) and river estuaries.

Nyons (French pronunciation: [njɔ̃s]; Occitan: Niòns) is a commune of the Drôme department in the Auvergne-Rhône-Alpes region in Southeastern France.

Nyons is a sub-prefecture of the department. Its olives have PDO status.

== Geography ==
Nyons is located close to the boundary of the Vaucluse department.

The commune is situated around 70 km south of Valence, the prefecture of the Drôme department, 40 km south-east of Montélimar, 45 km north-east of Orange, and 70 km north of Avignon, the prefecture of the Vaucluse department.

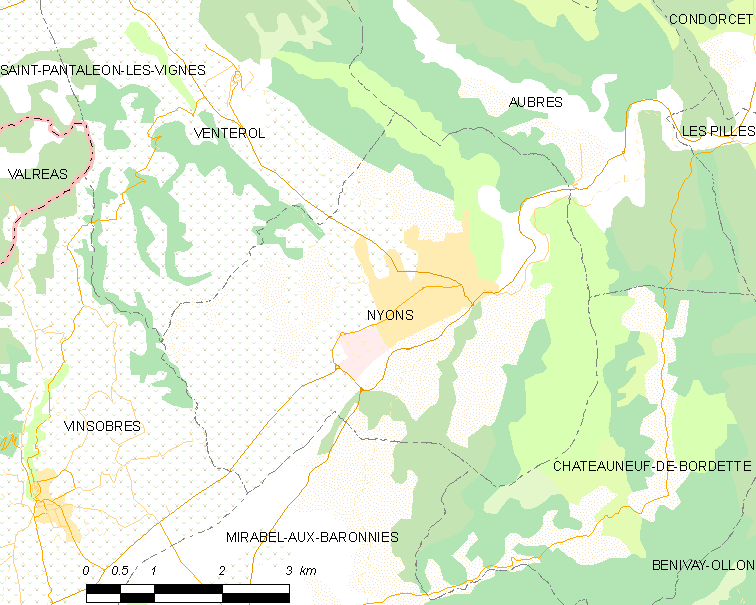
A map of the commune.

== Population ==
Historical population

Year	Pop.	±% p.a.
1793	2,700	—
1800	2,724	+0.13%
1806	2,744	+0.12%
1821	3,040	+0.69%
1831	3,397	+1.12%
1836	3,208	−1.14%
1841	3,251	+0.27%
1846	3,450	+1.20%
1851	3,590	+0.80%
1856	3,633	+0.24%
1861	3,653	+0.11%
1866	3,611	−0.23%
1872	3,623	+0.06%
1876	3,579	−0.31%
1881	3,222	−2.08%
1886	3,534	+1.87%
1891	3,349	−1.07%
1896	3,611	+1.52%
1901	3,638	+0.15%

Year	Pop.	±% p.a.
1906	3,514	−0.69%
1911	3,507	−0.04%
1921	3,150	−1.07%
1926	3,157	+0.04%
1931	3,246	+0.56%
1936	3,500	+1.52%
1946	3,576	+0.22%
1954	3,637	+0.21%
1962	4,270	+2.03%
1968	4,982	+2.60%
1975	5,607	+1.70%
1982	6,061	+1.12%
1990	6,353	+0.59%
1999	6,723	+0.63%
2007	7,109	+0.70%
2012	6,632	−1.38%
2017	6,793	+0.48%
2023	6,816	+0.06%

Source: EHESS and INSEE (1968-2023)

== Sights ==
- Jardin des Arômes
- Nyons Bridge

== Twin cities ==
Nyons is twinned with:

- Manciano, Tuscany, Italy
- Mechernich, North Rhine-Westphalia, Germany
- Nyon, Vaud, Switzerland
- Nules, Castellón, Spain
- Borca, Neamț, Romania

== Notable people ==
- Philis de La Charce (1645-1703), French war hero in the Nine Years' War.
- Joseph Roumanille (1818-1891), Provençal poet, he lived in Nyons from 1843 to 1844.
- Clair Tisseur (1827-1896), French architect
- Adrien Bertrand (1888-1917), Novelist awarded the Prix Goncourt.
- René Barjavel (1911-1985), Science fiction author.

== See also ==
- Baronnies
- Communes of the Drôme department
