= Adrien Bertrand =

French writer

Adrien Bertrand (4 August 1888, Nyons – 18 November 1917) was a French novelist whose short career was punctuated by a series of striking surrealist anti-war novels, written as Bertrand lay dying from complications involved in a wound he suffered whilst serving with the French Army in the First World War.

== Biography ==
Bertrand was born in 1888 in Nyons, Drôme, and after attending his local school, he departed for Paris, where he worked as a journalist on a number of papers, including Paris-Midi and L'Homme libre. During this period, he also began a literary magazine named Les Chiméres, which he used as a vehicle to publicise his socialist ideas and surrealist poetry, as well as give a voice to people of a like mind. Bertrand was a confirmed pacifist and just short of his 26th birthday when the First World War began, but nonetheless joined the French Army immediately, being given a position in the cavalry. For the next three months he was continuously engaged in the Battle of the Frontiers against the German Army and made a name for himself in his unit with some daring exploits.

Late in October 1914 a German shell burst amongst his unit, and a slice of shrapnel tore into Bertrand's chest, causing irreparable damage to his lungs. Bertrand survived the immediate aftermath of the wound, and was eventually transferred to the lowest grade of military hospital, into what was effectively a hospice. Doctors had informed him that his lungs would never work properly again, he was permanently bedridden and that death was inevitable in his condition. Faced with long periods of enforced bed rest, Bertrand returned to his writing and completed two works before he finally succumbed to his wounds over three years after he received them.

== Career ==
In 1916, Bertrand was awarded the Prix Goncourt for his novel L'Appel du sol about a group of soldiers thrust into the war Bertrand himself had fought, during which they experience horrors none ever expected to just a few weeks before. These soldiers study the motives behind their march to war, representing all France in their make-up and ideals, but also unpicking the reasons behind the French will to fight and the destructive nature of blind patriotism.

His second work was named L'Orage sur le jardin de Candide, and was a collection of four short stories, collected and finished in the weeks before his death, and reflecting that ominous state of affairs very strongly. They are frequently surreal and often heavily introspective, perhaps reflecting the world that Bertrand found himself in.

The first story is entitled "Carnet de campagne d'un soldat des armeés de la République", and purports to be the memoirs of one Auguste Rousset, a soldier in the French Army during the French Revolutionary War. His character is largely based on Bertrand himself, and the tale is semi-autobiographical in many of the experiences Rousset endures. This highlighted one of Bertrand's favourite topics, the cyclical nature of history, or as he put it, History repeats itself.

The second story is set in Roman times, named "L'Illusion du préfet Mucius", and is based on a story by Tacitus. In the tale, the main character Mucius, a Roman Christian, attempts to preach the Gospel amongst the Germani tribes, resulting in a battle very similar in tone to that of the Battle of the Marne, where Bertrand was wounded.

The third story is the most bizarre, named "De la pluie qui surprit Candide en son jardin et d'un entretien qu'il eut avec plusieurs personnages", it tells of a meeting in the garden of Candide between Achilles, Don Quixote, Faust, Mr Pickwick and the lead character of Bertrand's first novel L'Appel du sol. These fictional characters then discuss the previous work by Bertrand, and attempt to shape an ideal future for the war-ravaged world.

The fourth story, "Les Animaux sous la tourmente", is a more mainstream piece, in which several fables of La Fontaine are reworked to question the pomposity and arrogance of those in the French literary elite, especially Romain Rolland, who believed that art and literature should rise above the war rather than compromise themselves for it.

In addition to these more famous pieces, he also wrote a large body of poems and short stories as well as a short playscript. Most of these works were posthumously published.

== Works ==
- 1908 Catulle Mendès, non-fiction
- 1910 E. Brieux, non-fiction
- 1915 Les jardins de Priape, poetry
- 1916 L'Appel du sol, novel (trans. by J. Lewis May as The Call of the Soil in 1919)
- 1917 L'Orage sur le jardin de Candide, short stories
- 1917 Le Verger de Cypris, poetry
