= Enter Sir John =

1928 novel by Clemence Dane and Helen Simpson

- First US edition
- Author: Clemence Dane; Helen Simpson
- Cover artist: F. E. Warren
- Language: English
- Genre: Crime, Theatre-fiction
- Publisher: Hodder & Stoughton (UK); Cosmopolitan Book Corporation (US)
- Publication date: 1928
- Media type: Print
- Followed by: Re-enter Sir John

Enter Sir John is a 1928 British crime novel by Clemence Dane and Helen Simpson. It concerns Martella Baring, a young actress, who is put on trial and convicted of murder and a fellow actor Sir John Saumarez who takes up her cause and tries to prove her innocence. It was followed by the sequels Printer's Devil in 1930, and Re-enter Sir John in 1932.

== Plot ==
Young actress Martella Baring is convicted of the murder of Edna Druce, the wife of the acting company's manager. The charming and clever Sir John Saumarez, himself an actor and the manager of an acting company, attends the trial and becomes convinced of Martella's innocence. He enlists the help of his stage manager and the stage manager's wife, and Sir John proceeds to prove Martella's innocence and save her from hanging for a crime she didn't commit.

== Film adaptations ==
In 1930, the book was adapted into two films: Murder! and a German-language version Mary, both of which were directed by Alfred Hitchcock. A number of changes were made from novel to screen, such as making Sir John a member of the jury while in the book he was just a spectator at the trial. Many authors have incorrectly claimed the book was also adapted as a play, but there is no evidence for this assertion.

== Bibliography ==
- Chandler, Charlotte. It's only a movie: Alfred Hitchcock : a personal biography. First Applause, 2006.
- Barr, Charles. English Hitchcock. Cameron & Hollis, 1999.
