= Why Marry? =

1917 play by Jesse Lynch Williams

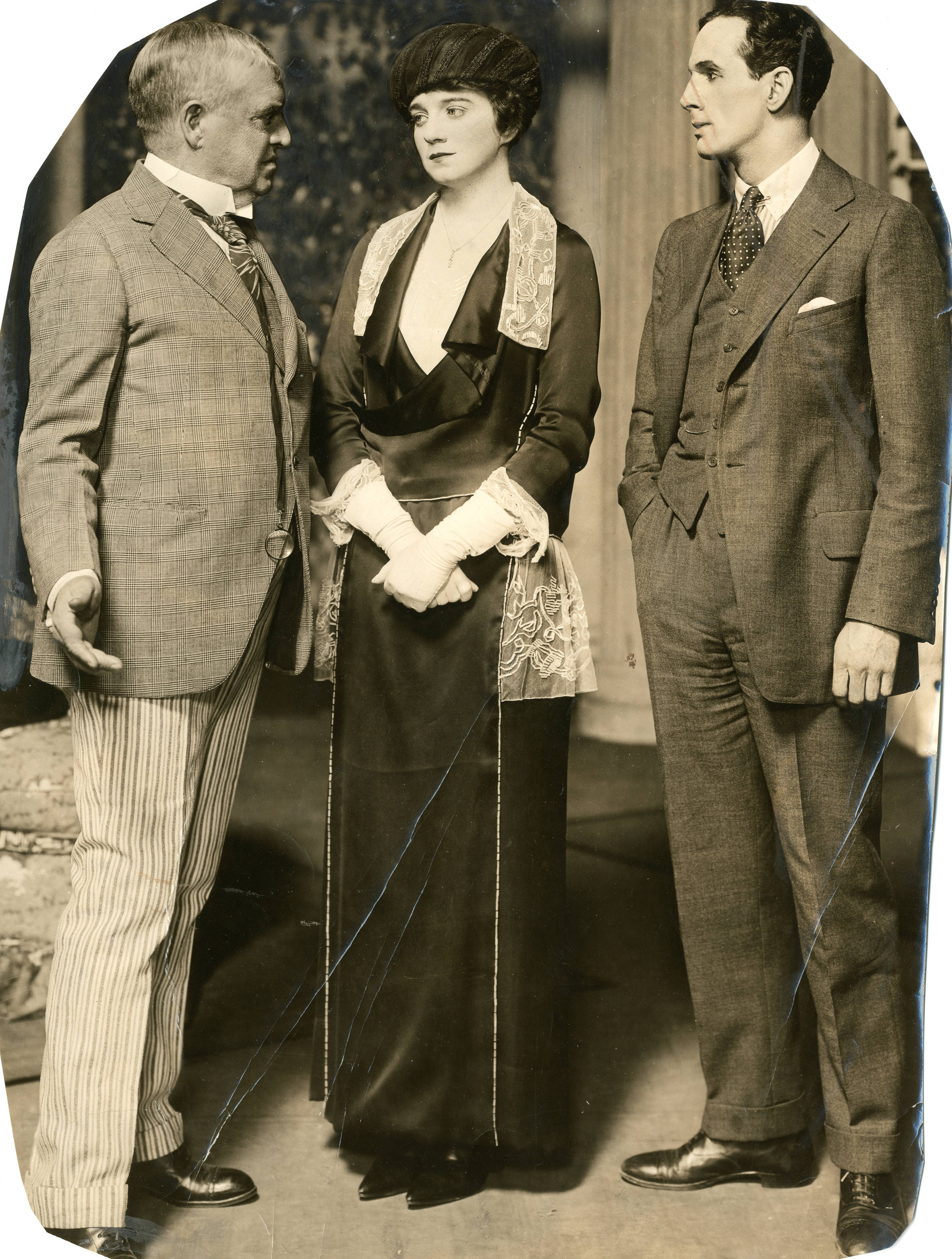
Nat Goodwin, Louise Randolph, and Leonard Mudie in the play in 1918

Why Marry? is a 1917 play written by American playwright Jesse Lynch Williams. It won the first Pulitzer Prize for Drama in 1918.

== Productions ==
Why Marry? premiered on Broadway at the Astor Theatre on December 25, 1917 and closed on April 1, 1918 after 120 performances. Directed by Roi Cooper Megrue, the cast featured Estelle Winwood (Helen), Edmund Breese (John), Lotus Robb (Jean), Harold West (Rex), Beatrice Beckley (Lucy), Ernest Lawford (Cousin Theodore), Nat Goodwin (Uncle Everett), and Shelley Hull (Ernest). The play was based on Williams' short story And So They Were Married.

The play won the 1918 Pulitzer Prize for Drama. A member of the Pulitzer Prize jury wrote: "I have seen Why Marry?...and find it an admirable piece of comedy...There are some things in the piece which I do not like but on the whole it is the best piece of drama I have seen this year."

The East Lynne Theater Company presented Why Marry? in Cape May, New Jersey in 2006 and 2007.

== Overview ==
The play takes place during a weekend at a country house.

The characters are: Jean, the host's youngest sister, brought up to be married; Rex, an unmarried neighbor; Lucy, the hostess; Cousin Theodore, a clergyman who does not believe in divorce; John, the host, who owns the house—"and almost everyone in it"—also does not believe in divorce; Uncle Everett, a judge, who does believe in divorce; Helen, the host's other sister who does not want to marry, although everyone wants to marry her; Ernest, a scientist who believes in neither marriage or divorce.

In the Introduction to the script, Williams wrote that near the end of the play, many relatives were to arrive for dinner, and to "influence the recalcitrant couple...though the family may have its place in the book, it proved to be an awful nuisance on the stage...It was not clear who was who...So we decided that the family had to be destroyed".

== Critical response ==
In his review for The New York Times, Nat Goodwin wrote: "The holy estate was again up for inspection last night at the Astor. Jesse Lynch Williams would, it is to be presumed, acknowledge the debt to Bernard Shaw which is owed by so many writers of modern social comedy...his play is written from a thoroughly original point of view, is as keenly satirical as Shaw at his best, and, last but not least, amusing...a play which is perhaps the most intelligent and searching satire on social institutions ever written by an American."

== Analysis ==
Brenda Murphy wrote: "The presentation of the first Pulitzer Prize for drama...for his sophisticated discussion play Why Marry? was the first clear sign that realism had arrived in the American theater...[the] play combined the...traditional subjects of the American discussion play with the Shavian notion that serious points about serious issues could be made through witty dialogue and comic, even farcical, action."
