= Regiment of Women =

1917 novel by Winifred Ashton

- Paperback cover
- Author: Clemence Dane
- Language: English
- Publication date: 1917
- Publication place: United Kingdom
- Media type: Print
- Pages: 345 pp
- ISBN: 978-0-3132-0582-8
- OCLC: 4260761

Regiment of Women is the debut novel of Winifred Ashton writing as Clemence Dane. First published in 1917, the novel has gained some notoriety due to its more or less veiled treatment of lesbian relationships inside and outside a school setting. It is said to have inspired Radclyffe Hall to write The Well of Loneliness.

== Title ==
"Regiment of women", which means "rule by women", are the final three words of the title of John Knox's polemical The First Blast of the Trumpet Against the Monstruous Regiment of Women (1558).

== Plot outline ==
Set in a small town in Edwardian England, Regiment of Women is about the relationship between two teachers at a private (and elitist) girls' school. One of them, Clare Hartill, is in her mid-thirties and runs the school in all but name, the ageing and sickly headmistress depending on her whenever a decision has to be taken concerning the school or any of its pupils. Most of the girls are devoted to Hartill and gladly suffer under her strict but charismatic rule and the loads of homework she sets them, mainly to prove to her and to themselves that they are more academically advanced than she told them they were. Hartill lives alone near the school in a small, old-fashioned flat full of books but without gas or electricity.

The other teacher is Alwynne Durand, an attractive nineteen-year-old woman without any formal training who lives with Elsbeth Loveday, her unmarried aunt and guardian. When Durand starts teaching at the school she is immediately popular with her students but also excites Hartill's attention — not just because the young mistress is as enthusiastic about teaching as herself, but also because Hartill is always on the lookout for companionship. The two women become close friends, and Durand spends more and more of her spare time in Hartill's flat, occasionally not returning to her aunt's for days. The couple also travel abroad together during the summer holidays. Although Loveday and Hartill hardly ever meet, a strange kind of antagonism develops between them, each woman fighting to spend more time than they do with Alwynne Durand and to be the dominant person in Alwynne's life.

In the course of the schoolyear one of Hartill's protégées, an unfortunate fourteen-year-old called Louise who has disappointed Hartill by failing an important exam, commits suicide by jumping from an upper floor window of the school building. The suicide is successfully hushed up, pronounced a case of accidental death, and quickly forgotten. What Hartill deliberately fails to mention, however, is that Louise's death, which happened on the night of the school play, was apparently triggered by her harsh criticism of Louise's excellent performance in the play. In the months that follow, Hartill even manages to shift the burden of guilt onto Durand's shoulders, persuading the young mistress that she ought to have detected any suicidal tendencies in Louise while giving her extra lessons.

Hartill's increasingly bizarre and offensive behaviour and her naive niece's growing dependence on her older friend call Elsbeth Loveday to action. When, on top of her shattered nerves, Alwynne Durand comes down with the flu, Loveday insists on her not returning to school for the rest of the term and on recuperating from her illness in the country instead. Alwynne agrees, if reluctantly at first, to spend some time with distant relatives she has never met before. The idyllic spring landscape she encounters after leaving town actually soothes her nerves, and Alwynne grows more and more fond of country life and the people she meets in her new surroundings.

But Elsbeth Loveday's scheme includes more than her niece's mere convalescence. As planned by her aunt, Alwynne Durand finds a confidant, and secret admirer, in thirty-year-old Roger Lumsden, a good-hearted, intelligent and handsome man who runs his own gardening business. Completely inexperienced with men except for what she has read in novels, Alwynne does not recognise her feelings for Lumsden as love, and she still looks forward to her reunion with Hartill. When she eventually returns to her home town, Lumsden follows her, proposes to her, and, naturally, is rejected. Only when Hartill, too sure of her seemingly inseparable bond with Alwynne, continues treating her badly does Alwynne wake up to reality. She sends Hartill a telegram telling her she has taken the train to the country in order to get married.
