= Wurzel-Flummery =

1917 play by A. A. Milne

Wurzel-Flummery is a play by A. A. Milne, which was performed for the first time in 1917, in London.

It was the first play Milne wrote. He originally wrote it in three acts, but when he got a good offer for a production if he cut it down to a two-act play, he rewrote it. By removing another character, he got it down to one act, which he liked best in the end.

On 7 April 1917 it was produced with the following cast: Nigel Playfair, Helen Haye, Peggy Kurton, Martin Lewis, Dion Boucicault Jr. and Bertram Siems at the New Theatre, London.
