= Clemence Dane =

English novelist and playwright (1888–1965)

Clemence Dane CBE
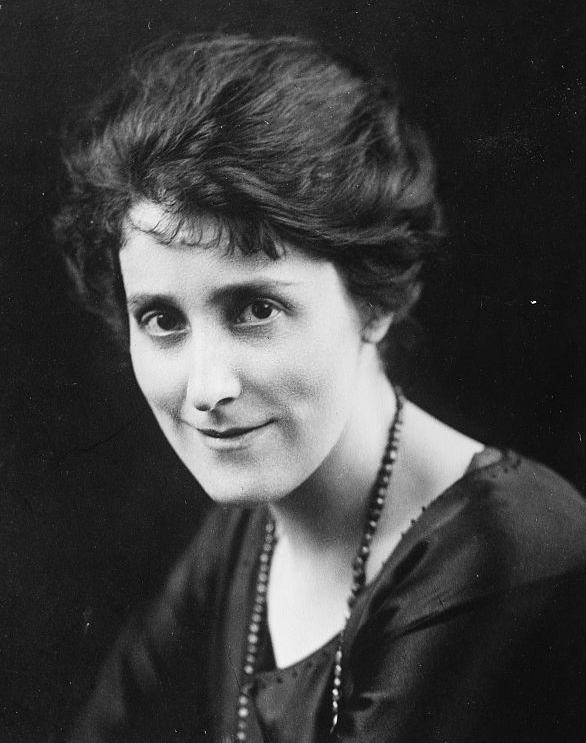
- Born: Winifred Ashton; 21 February 1888; Blackheath, England
- Died: 28 March 1965 (aged 77); London, England
- Occupations: Novelist, playwright
- Writing career
- Pen name: Clemence Dane
- Notable work: Regiment of Women (1914)

Winifred Ashton CBE, better known by the pseudonym Clemence Dane (21 February 1888 – 28 March 1965), was an English novelist and playwright.

== Life and career ==
After completing her education, Dane went to Switzerland to work as a French tutor, but returned home after a year. She studied art in London and Germany. After the First World War, she taught at a girls' school and began writing. She took the pseudonym "Clemence Dane" from the church, St Clement Danes on the Strand, London.

Her first novel, Regiment of Women, written in 1914, was a study of life in a girls' school. In 1919 she wrote Legend, the story of a group of acquaintances who debate the meaning of a dead friend's life and work. Dane's 1921 play, A Bill of Divorcement, tells the story of a daughter who cares for her deranged father and faces the fact that his mental illness may be hereditary. The smash hit play was adapted for the screen three times, using the same title as the play: a silent film in 1922, a 1932 film starring Katharine Hepburn and John Barrymore, and a 1940 film starring Maureen O’Hara and Adolphe Menjou.

Dane began writing screenplays as well as novels. In 1933-1934 she travelled to Hollywood on a contract with RKO and returned again in 1937-8 and in 1947 after the war. In England she worked with Alexander Korda. She co-wrote the screenplay for Anna Karenina, starring Greta Garbo and Fire Over England based on the novel by A.E.W. Mason, starring a young Laurence Olivier and Vivian Leigh. The pinnacle of Dane's success was winning an Academy Award with Anthony Pelissier for the film Perfect Strangers, released in the United States as Vacation from Marriage, starring Robert Donat and Deborah Kerr as a married couple transformed by their experiences in the Second World War.

Dane, at the age of 30, was one of the women eligible to vote for the first time under the Representation of the People Act 1918. Her opinions on The Women's Side were published in 1926 and she argued that women should do more with their freedom. She compared the modern girl's choices with the popular gambling card game Speculation in Jane Austen's Mansfield Park. She wrote for Time and Tide and was a member of the Six Point Group.

Dane's 1931 novel Broome Stages followed the fortunes of an acting family from the time of Queen Anne to the present. Broome Stages became a surprise bestseller. Dane and Helen de Guerry Simpson, both members of the Detection Club, wrote three detective novels together featuring their creation Sir John Saumarez. The first, Enter Sir John, was filmed by Alfred Hitchcock in 1930 as Murder! and in a German-language version as Mary. Dane contributed to the Club's serials The Scoop and The Floating Admiral. Dane's The Arrogant History of White Ben (1939) is a dystopian novel set in a politically unstable near future.

Dane's last play, Eighty in the Shade (1959) was written for and starred her friend, Dame Sybil Thorndike. Early in her career, Dane had been on stage under the pseudonym Diana Cortis. She made her a début in H. V. Esmond’s ‘Eliza Comes to Stay’ but gave up to write her first novel in 1914. Years after Dane expressed an interest in returning to acting, and her friend Noël Coward wrote the part of Madame Arcati, the eccentric medium in Blithe Spirit for her. The National Portrait Gallery contains two works by Dane, both of Coward. One is an oil painting and the other is a bronze bust. The gallery also contains a portrait of Dane by Frederic Yates.

According to Arthur Marshall, she was famous for her indecent, though entirely innocent, remarks. "The physical side of life had passed her by, together with the words, slang and otherwise, that accompany it. Time and again she settled for an unfortunate word or phrase. Inviting Noël Coward to lunch during the war, when food was difficult, she boomed encouragement down the telephone; 'Do come! I've got such a lovely cock.' ('I do wish you'd call it a hen', Noel answered). To use correctly, in a literary sense, the words 'erection', 'tool' and 'spunk' was second nature to her. When wishing to describe herself as being full of life and creative energy, she chose, not really very wisely, the word 'randy'."

In 1955, Dane edited the Novels of Tomorrow series for publisher Michael Joseph. This was a series of science fiction novels featuring such authors as John Wyndham, Robert Sheckley, and Cyril M. Kornbluth.

Dane also wrote a book on the history of Covent Garden (where she lived for a number of years) titled London has a Garden and published in 1964.

She was awarded the CBE in 1953. By the time of her death in London, on 28 March 1965, Dane had written more than 30 plays and 16 novels.

== Novels and plays ==
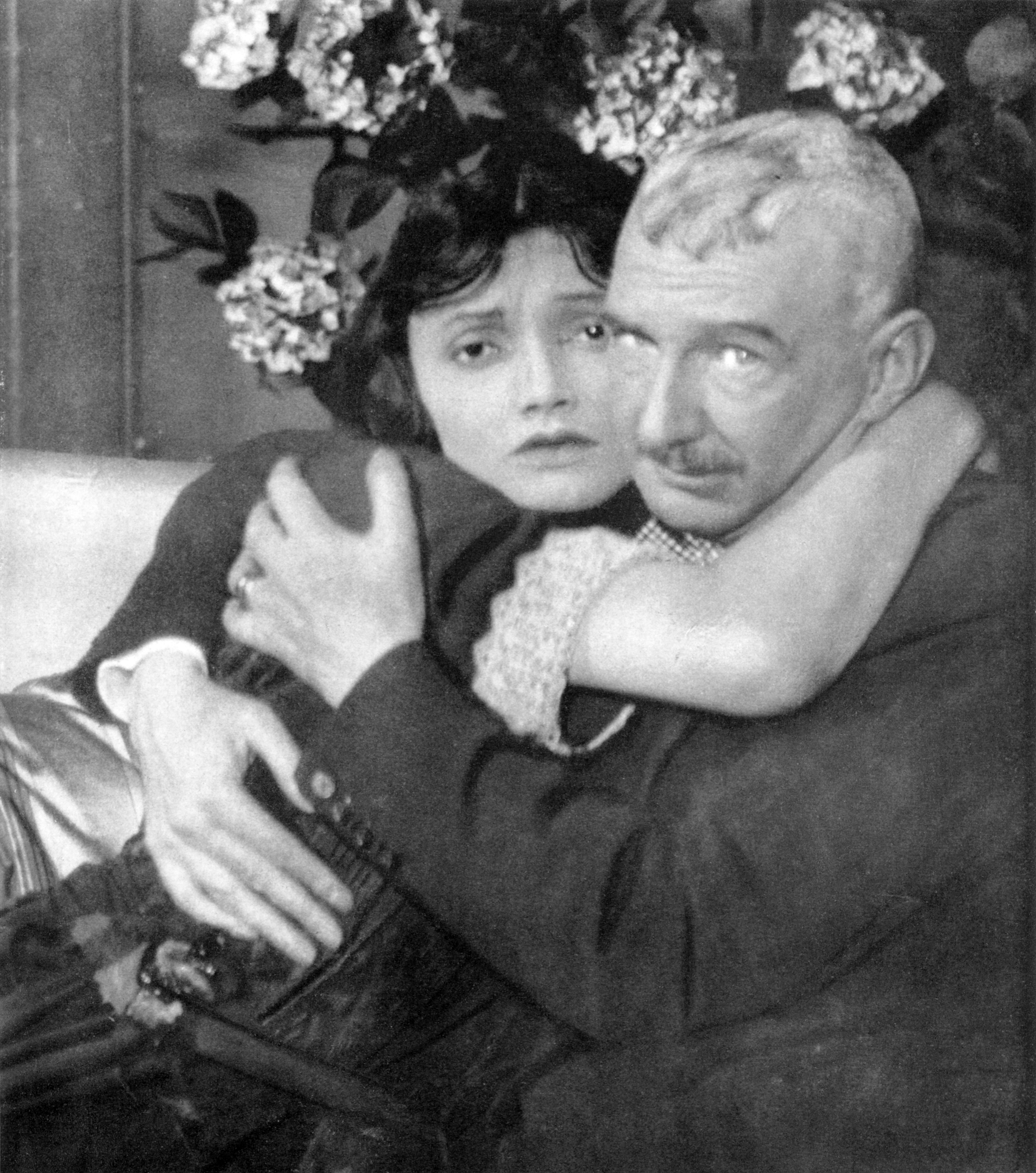
Katharine Cornell and Allan Pollock in the original Broadway production of A Bill of Divorcement (1921)

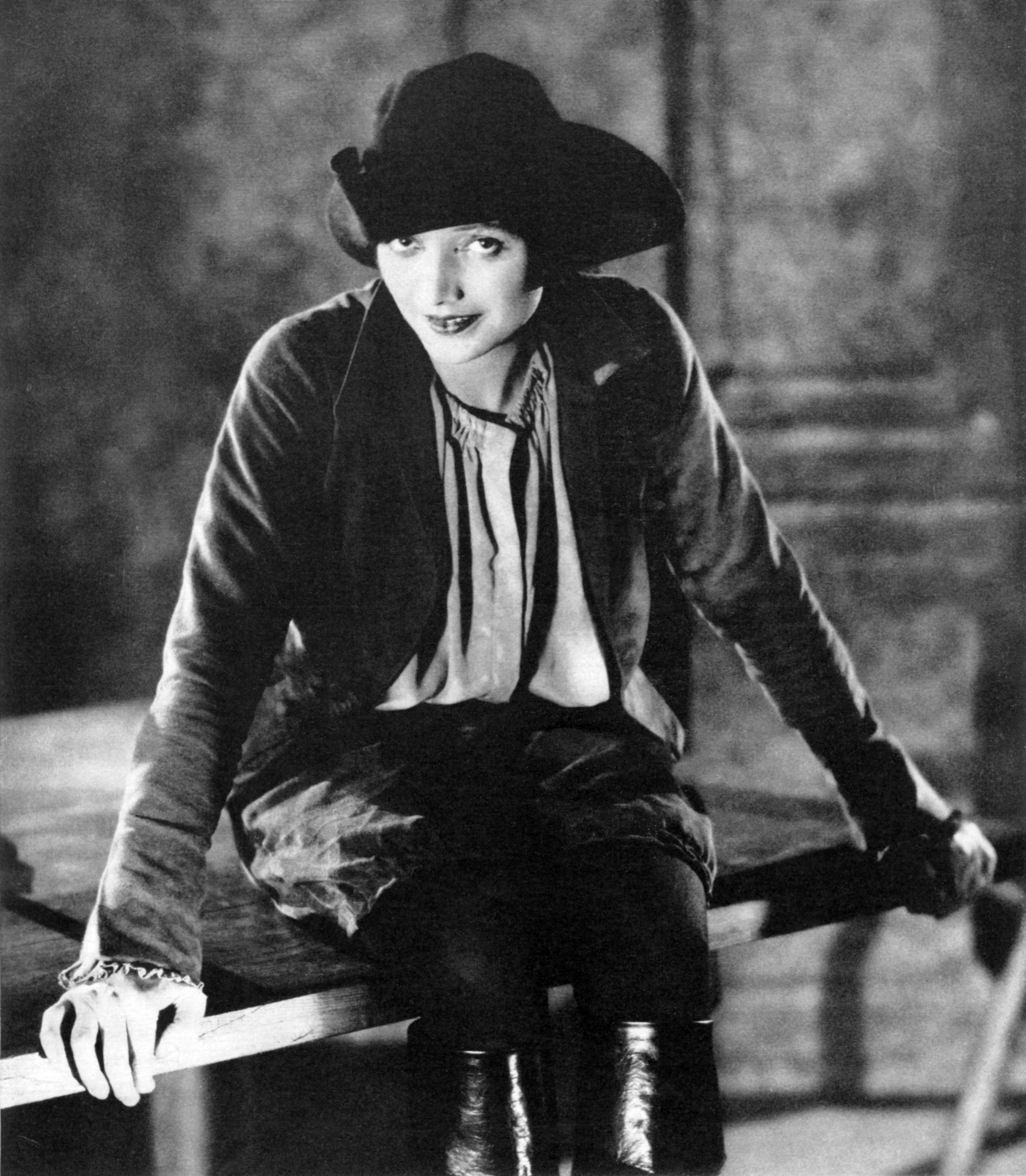
Katharine Cornell as Mary Fitton in the Broadway production of Will Shakespeare (1923)

- Regiment of Women (1917)
- First the Blade: A Comedy of Growth (1918)
- Legend (1919)
- A Bill of Divorcement (1921)
- Will Shakespeare: An Invention in Four Acts (1921)
- Shivering Shocks or The Hiding Place (published in The Graphic Christmas Number, 1922) - a play for boys sometimes misattributed to Agatha Christie
- The Way Things Happen (1924)
- Naboth's Vineyard: A Piece in Three Acts (1925)
- Granite (1926)
- The Women's Side (1926)
- The Babyons (1927)
- The Dearly Beloved of Benjamin Cobb (1927) - short story
- Mariners (1927)
- Adam’s Opera: The Text of a Play (1928)
- Enter Sir John (1928) (with Helen Simpson)
- Third Person Singular (1928)
- The King Waits (1929)
- Printer's Devil, published in US as Author Unknown (1930) (with Helen Simpson)
- Broome Stages (1931)
- Theater Royale (1931)
- Re-enter Sir John (1932) (with Helen Simpson)
- Julia Newberry's Diary (1933)
- Come of Age: The Text of a Play in Music and Words (1934) (with Richard Addinsell)
- Moonlight is Silver: A Play in Three Acts (1934)
- Wild Decembers: A Play in Three Acts (1932)
- Edmond Rostand's L'aiglon (1934)
- The Amateur Gentleman: From the Novel By Jeffery Farnol (1936)
- The Moon Is Feminine. A novel (1938)
- Hebbel's Herod and Mariamne (1938)
- The Arrogant History of White Ben (1939)
- The Shelter Book- A Gathering of Tales, Poems, Essays, Notes and Notions Arranged By Clemence Dane for Use in Shelters, Tubes, Basements and Cellars in War-Time (1940 (editor))
- The Lion and the Unicorn. A Play in Three Acts (1943)
- He Brings Great News. A novel (1946)
- Bonnie Prince Charlie (1948) (with Dorothy Middleton)
- The Flower Girls. A novel (1954)
- Eighty in the Shade (1959)
- Marriage Lines (1949)
- The Godson: A Fantasy (1964)

== Non fiction ==
- Claude Houghton: Appreciations (with Hugh Walpole)
- London has a Garden (1964)
- The Welcoming Land (poem)
