= Helen de Guerry Simpson =

Australian novelist and British Liberal Party politician (1897–1940)

Helen Simpson
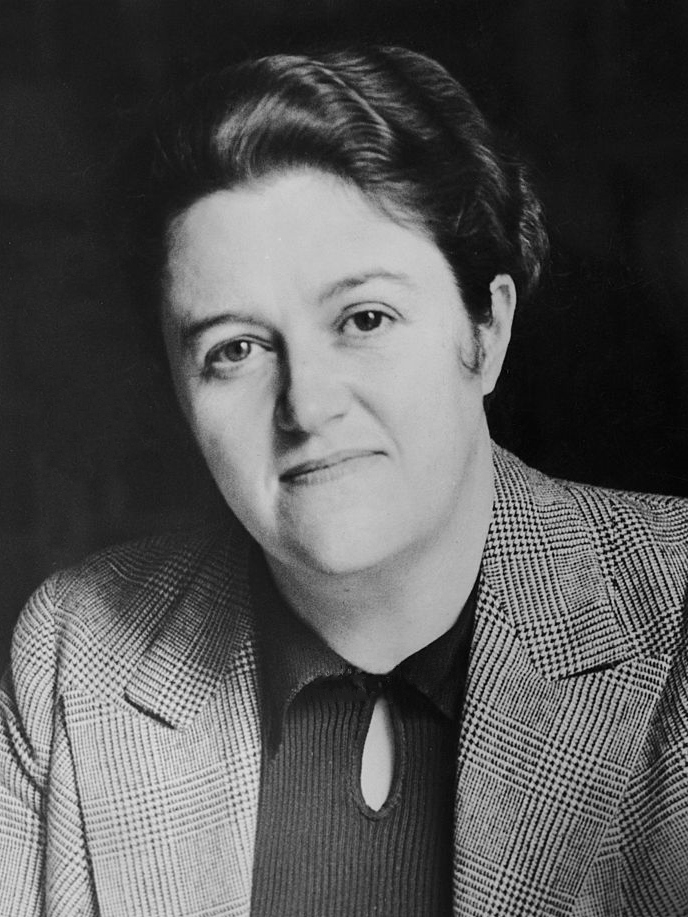
- Born: Helen de Guerry Simpson; 1 December 1897; Sydney, Australia
- Died: 14 October 1940 (aged 42); Worcestershire, England
- Occupations: Writer and politician
- Spouses: Denis Browne (m. 1927)
- Children: 1
- Writing career
- Language: English
- Notable works: Boomerang, Under Capricorn

Helen de Guerry Simpson (1 December 1897 – 14 October 1940) was an Australian novelist and British Liberal Party politician.

== Youth and education ==
Simpson was born in Sydney. She attended the Convent of the Sacred Heart, Rose Bay (now called Kincoppal-Rose Bay, School of the Sacred Heart) and Abbotsleigh, Wahroonga. On returning to England she went to Oxford, reading French (1916-1917), at a time when women could study at Oxford but not receive degrees. in April 1918, she joined the WRNS to work in decoding as a senior section officer. In September 1919 she returned to Oxford to study music, and there became intensely interested in theatre, founding the Oxford Women's Dramatic Society and writing and publishing several plays. She was sent down in 1921 without completing her degree, apparently for breaking regulations prohibiting men and women students from acting together.

== Career as a writer ==
She was a member of the Detection Club and contributed to two of their round-robin works The Floating Admiral (1931) and Ask a Policeman (1933) and the creative non-fiction The Anatomy of Murder (1936).

Boomerang, published in 1932, was her first big success. It was awarded the James Tait Black Memorial Prize for fiction and serialised for radio by William Power in 1937.

Simpson also wrote two historical biographies, The Spanish Marriage (1933) and Henry VIII (1934), and a book of household management, The Happy Housewife (1934). The Waiting City, which appeared in 1933, is her translation of a selection from Louis-Sébastien Mercier's Le Tableau de Paris. She wrote three novels, Enter Sir John (1929), Printer's Devil (1930) and Re-enter Sir John (1932), with Clemence Dane. Enter Sir John was filmed as Murder! (1930) directed by Alfred Hitchcock, who later directed the film version of Under Capricorn (1949). Helen Simpson also wrote portions of the dialogue for Hitchcock's movie Sabotage (1936).

In 1937 Simpson went to Australia for the Australian Broadcasting Commission. She gave a series of lectures and conducted research for the novel Under Capricorn, which appeared in 1937 and was set in Sydney about 100 years earlier. In 1938, she published A Woman Among Wild Men, an account of Mary Kingsley. This was later published in 1950 as a Puffin Story Book under the title A Woman Among Savages.

== Political career ==
In 1939 she was selected by the Isle of Wight Liberal Association to be their parliamentary candidate at the UK General Election which was expected to take place in 1939 or 1940. The seat was held by the Conservatives but the Liberals were expected to challenge strongly to recapture the seat they last won in 1923. She attended the Liberal Party Assembly at Scarborough in June 1939 and travelled around England speaking for the Liberal Party.

== Personal ==
She became ill and underwent a surgical operation in 1940, but died from cancer on 14 October 1940. Her husband, Sir Denis Browne, survived her with their daughter Clemence, who was named after Simpson's collaborator Clemence Dane. Simpson's last novel, Maid No More, was published in 1940.

== Bibliography ==
=== Novels ===
- Acquittal (1925)
- Cups, Wands and Swords (1927)
- Enter Sir John (1929), with Clemence Dane. Serialised in Nash's Magazine in 1928
- The Desolate House (1929)
- Printer's Devil (1930), with Clemence Dane. Also known as Author Unknown
- Vantage Striker (1931)
- Boomerang (1932). Winner of the James Tait Black Memorial Prize for the Best Novel Published in 1932
- Re-enter Sir John (1932), with Clemence Dane
- The Woman on the Beast: Viewed from Three Angles (1933)
- Ask A Policeman (1933), with members of The Detection Club (Anthony Berkeley, Milward Kennedy, Gladys Mitchell, John Rhode, Dorothy L. Sayers and Simpson each contributed a chapter)
- Saraband for Dead Lovers (1935)
- Under Capricorn (1937)
- Maid No More (1940)

=== Collections ===
- Philosophies in Little (1921) original verse and translations
- The Baseless Fabric (1925) 11 short stories
- Mumbudget (1928) 6 short fairy stories for children
- Heartsease and Honesty: Being the Pastimes of the Sieur de Grammont (1935). Translation from the French

=== Biographies ===
- The Spanish Marriage, 1554 (1933)
- Henry VIII (1934)

=== Non-fiction ===
- The Waiting City: Paris 1782-1788 (1933), an abridged translation of Le Tableau de Paris by Louis-Sebastien Mercier
- Has Russia Hoaxed the Worker?. Billings Gazette, 15 January 1933
- What Communism Does to Women. Los Angeles Times, 29 January 1933
- The Happy Housewife (1934)
- The Witch Unbound. Collected in The Boat Train (1934), edited by Mary Agnes Hamilton
- What's Wrong with Our Hospitals?. Time and Tide, 1934
- The Female Felon (1935)
- Death of Henry Kinder (1936), included in The Anatomy of Murder by The Detection Club

=== Drama ===
- A Man of His Time (1923)
- Pan in Pimlico, collected in Four One Act Plays, edited by AP Herbert (1923)
- The Women's Comedy (1926), a translation of L'ecole des Femmes by Moliere
- Gooseberry Fool (1929), with Clemence Dane
- Oxford Preserved (1930), with music by Richard Addinsell

=== Short fiction ===
- [Title unknown]. Nash's Magazine, December 1928
- My Daughter's Daughter. Sphere, 1 December 1929
- London in June. Sphere, 14 June 1930
- Death Versus Debt. Broadcast as a reading by Simpson. BBC National Service, 29 June 1934
- Puss in Boots. Collected in The Fairies Return (1934)
- No Jewel Is Like Rosalind (1938). Broadcast as a reading by Simpson on the BBC (1938)

== Sources ==
- Serle, Percival (1949). "Simpson, Helen". Dictionary of Australian Biography. Sydney: Angus & Robertson.
