= Alexander Hamilton (film) =

1931 American biographical film directed by John G. Adolfi

- Directed by: John G. Adolfi
- Written by: Julien Josephson; Maude T. Howell
- Based on: Hamilton by George Arliss; Mary Hamlin
- Starring: George Arliss; Doris Kenyon; Dudley Digges; June Collyer
- Cinematography: James Van Trees
- Edited by: Owen Marks
- Music by: David Memes
- Production company: Warner Bros. Pictures
- Distributed by: Warner Bros.
- Release date: September 12, 1931
- Running time: 70 minutes
- Country: United States
- Languages: English; French
- Budget: $345,000
- Box office: $586,000

Alexander Hamilton is a 1931 American pre-Code biographical film about Alexander Hamilton, produced and distributed by Warner Bros. Pictures and based on the 1917 play Hamilton by George Arliss and Mary Hamlin. It was directed by John G. Adolfi and stars Arliss in the title role. It follows the attempts of Hamilton to establish a new financial structure for the United States following the Confederation Period and the establishment of a new Constitution, complicated by the scandal of Hamilton's extramarital affair with Maria Reynolds. The film is preserved at the Library of Congress.

== Plot ==
Near Princeton, New Jersey at the end of the American Revolutionary War, Alexander Hamilton, who has been serving as an officer and aide-de-camp to General George Washington, watches fretfully from a distance while Washington makes his Farewell Address to the Army, promising that the new nation will pay the soldiers for their service. Soon after, Hamilton expresses his concern to the general about how that promise will be fulfilled when each of the thirteen former colonies, now states, has its own trade practices and currencies.

Soon, following the period of the Articles of Confederation, the new Constitution of the United States has been ratified and Washington is serving in Philadelphia as the country's first President with Hamilton as his Secretary of the Treasury. Hamilton is at odds with Anti-Federalists in the government, including Thomas Jefferson and James Monroe, who are fearful that a strong central government will lead to a monarchy or dictatorship. The Anti-Federalists are especially concerned about Hamilton's proposals for a national bank and an Assumption Bill, which would require the federal government to assume the debts incurred by the states during the Revolution, though their arguments with Hamilton are heated but respectful.

In a Philadelphia tavern, Jefferson, Monroe, and former soldiers argue these points with each other and with the French diplomat and statesman Talleyrand, who supports Hamilton's positions and defends his honor. Jefferson tempers his criticisms of Hamilton, explaining to Monroe that he wants Hamilton's support to establish a new capital city for the country that will not be located in the North.

In the meantime, Hamilton has shared his own views with his wife Betsy, whom he deeply loves, and with his father-in-law Philip Schuyler, a former American general and now Senator from New York. When Betsy sails to England to care for her ailing sister Angelica, leaving Hamilton on his own, Timothy Roberts, a (fictional) disgruntled veteran, also now a Senator with his own agenda, hatches a plot to undermine people's trust in Hamilton's integrity.

Schuyler calls on Hamilton, finding him hard at work and neglecting to eat. Schuyler tells him that Jefferson and Monroe will be calling to discuss a Residence Bill that would establish the permanent location of the national capital. Their discussion is interrupted by a young mother with a baby who entreats Hamilton for support since her husband still has not been paid the money owed to him for his military service. Hamilton offers her some food and money and sends her off with promises to see that his own legislation is passed. When Jefferson and Monroe arrive, Schuyler, who has advocated for a Northern capital in Albany, New York City, or Philadelphia, listens outside the room. Hamilton is able to maneuver his guests into accepting a compromise: he will support Jefferson's suggestion for a new capital city on the Potomac River, halfway between North and South, in exchange for their support of his National Bank and Assumption Bill. Having agreed to this, Jefferson and Monroe depart but Talleyrand calls, proposing that he and Hamilton go off on a "spree" in the town while Betsy is away. Hamilton thinks better of the idea and remains home when the Frenchman departs.

Alone for the evening, Hamilton answers the door for another caller, Maria Reynolds, who asks him for money that will allow her to leave her abusive husband. She seduces Hamilton into walking her home and invites him upstairs to her room.

Months later, a formal reception is held to celebrate Betsy's return from England. At the reception, Besty and Hamilton conspire to leave early to spend time together. Suddenly, a mysterious and belligerent man approaches Hamilton and identifies himself as the husband of Maria Reynolds and demands blackmail payments to avoid his informing Mrs. Hamilton of Alexander's infidelity with Mrs Reynolds.

Days later, while enjoying Betsy's piano playing in their home, Hamilton receives a visit from a group of political rivals who confronting him with their knowledge of the Reynolds blackmail payments. Hamilton refutes any implication that he was providing Reynolds with valuable financial information, stating the payments were of a private nature. Hamilton finally admits that he was being blackmailed by Reynolds for Hamilton's affair with his wife Maria. When Betsy enters the room, most of the callers are ready to leave, but Hamilton feels honor-bound to confirm to his wife about the nature of his affair after Roberts accidentally let the secret slip.

News of the scandal and Hamilton's own account hit the newspapers, and Betsy prepares to return to her family home in Albany but suddenly has a change of heart and informs her husband that she will remain with him.

When a large delegation including Jefferson and Monroe arrives at his house, Hamilton is certain that his bill have been defeated, that he will have to resign from his office, and become an exile. To his surprise, Jefferson informs him that due to Hamilton's integrity, his bill has passed. Hamilton now predicts that the credit and honor of the nation have been established and future prosperity is assured.

== Cast ==
- George Arliss as Alexander Hamilton
- Doris Kenyon as Mrs. Betsy Hamilton
- Dudley Digges as Senator Timothy Roberts
- June Collyer as Mrs. Maria Reynolds
- Montagu Love as Thomas Jefferson
- Ralf Harolde as James Reynolds
- Lionel Belmore as General Philip Schuyler
- Alan Mowbray as George Washington
- John T. Murray as Count Talleyrand
- Morgan Wallace as James Monroe
- John Larkin as Zekial
- Charles Middleton as Townsman (uncredited)

== Production ==
At the time of the events depicted, Hamilton was in his 30s (in the opening sequence he is still in his 20s). He is portrayed by George Arliss, then in his 60s. For the roles of Jefferson and Monroe, Arliss cast two character actors who had built reputations for playing villainous parts. Dudley Digges plays the villainous and entirely fictitious character Senator Roberts.

== Box office ==
According to Warner Bros., the film earned $453,000 in the U.S. and $133,000 in other markets.

== Bibliography ==
- Robert M. Fells, George Arliss: The Man Who Played God (Scarecrow Press, 2004)

== See also ==
- List of films about the American Revolution
- List of television series and miniseries about the American Revolution
