= Jesse Lynch Williams =

American dramatist

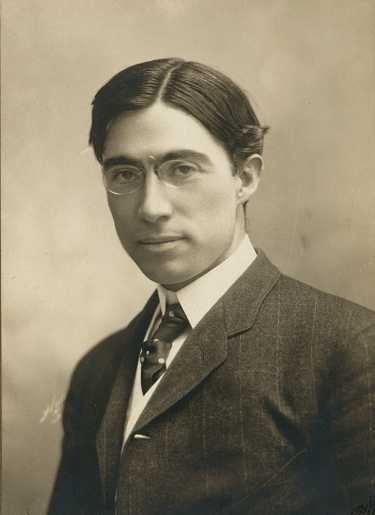
- Jesse Lynch Williams, 1905, gelatin silver print, Hall Studios, National Portrait Gallery
- Born: August 17, 1871; Sterling, Illinois
- Died: September 14, 1929 (aged 58); Herkimer, New York
- Education: Princeton University (BA, MA)
- Occupations: Journalist, novelist, playwright
- Years active: 1891–1929
- Known for: First Pulitzer Prize for Drama for Why Marry? (1917)
- Spouse: Alice Laidlaw

Jesse Lynch Williams (August 17, 1871 – September 14, 1929) was an American author and dramatist. He won the first Pulitzer Prize for Drama for his play Why Marry? (1917). He was a journalist for three New York publications and co-founded the Princeton Alumni Weekly and the Princeton Triangle Club.

== Early life ==
Williams was born in Sterling, Illinois, on August 17, 1871, to Elizabeth Brown (Riddle) and Rev. Meade Creighton Williams, pastor of a Presbyterian church in St. Louis, Missouri. His father wrote Early Mackinac and was the editor of a Presbyterian journal. Jesse's brothers were David. R. Williams, of St. Louis, and Terrell Williams, a law school professor of Washington University in St. Louis.

His grandfather, also Jesse Lynch Williams, was appointed by President Abraham Lincoln as the government director of the roads. He was an engineer and constructor for the Union Pacific Railroad.

== Education and career ==
Williams studied at Beloit Academy. He began his literary career in college. He won the Nassau Literary Magazine short story contest in his junior year. He received his bachelor's degree in 1892. As a graduate student at Princeton University, he wrote Princeton Stories (1895) which often featured the daily life of an undergraduate football player. He graduated from Princeton with a master's degree in 1895. In 1898, he wrote The History of Princeton University with John de Witt. He and Booth Tarkington co-founded the Triangle Club at Princeton and edited The Lit. For three years, beginning in 1900, he co-founded and was the first editor of the Princeton Alumni Weekly. Robert Frost wrote a recommendation to the University of Michigan regarding his suitability for the Fellowship of Creative Arts. Frost indicated that Williams was relevant, open-minded, practical, a "good all-around participator", and, along with his wife, good company. During the 1925–1926 academic year, he held the Fellowship in Creative Arts at the University of Michigan. He received an honorary Doctor of Letters from Princeton in 1919.

Beginning in 1893, he was a reporter for The Sun, and wrote fiction on the side. He joined the staff at the New York Commercial Advertiser (The New York Globe) from 1895 to 1897, followed by the Scribner's Magazine. From 1900 to 1903, he was the editor of the Princeton Alumni Weekly, after which he worked full-time writing plays and novels.

He wrote a number of short stories starting in the 1890s. He wrote four plays and six novels by 1929, including Why Marry? (1917), for which he was awarded the first Pulitzer Prize for Drama. He wrote the play The Stolen Story (1906), based upon his times as a reporter, which he first wrote as a short story, The Stolen Story and Other Newspaper Stories. He wrote the play The Stolen Story (1906), based upon his times as a reporter. His plays Why Marry? (1917) and Why Not (1922), and Lovely Lady (1925) were produced on Broadway. Why Not explores the experiences of divorce. Lovely Lady is about the attempts of a lady to attract the attentions of a lawyer and his son. His novels and stories include Princeton Stories, The Adventures of a Freshman (1899), The Girl and the Game (1908), The Married Life of the Frederic Carrolls (1910), and She Knew She Was Right.

He was a member of the Authors League of America, the National Institute of Arts and Letters, and other organizations, in which he sometimes had a leadership role.

== Marriage and children ==
He was married to Alice Laidlaw (1872–1960), daughter of Elizabeth C. Onderdonk and Henry Bell Laidlaw, on June 1, 1898, in New York. They had three children, Henry Meade, Jesse Lynch, and Laidlaw Onderdonk Williams. They lived in Princeton, New Jersey. Alice graduated from Veltin School for Girls in 1892. She was a member of the Audubon Society and the Society for the Prevention of Cruelty to Animals, and a number of organizations, including sitting on the executive board of the New Jersey Equal Franchise Society. She wrote a book titled Sunday Suppers (1912).

== Death ==
Williams died of a heart attack on September 14, 1929, at the home of Assistant Secretary of the Navy Theodore Douglas Robinson in Jordanville, New York, or Herkimer, New York.
