= Murder! =

1930 film

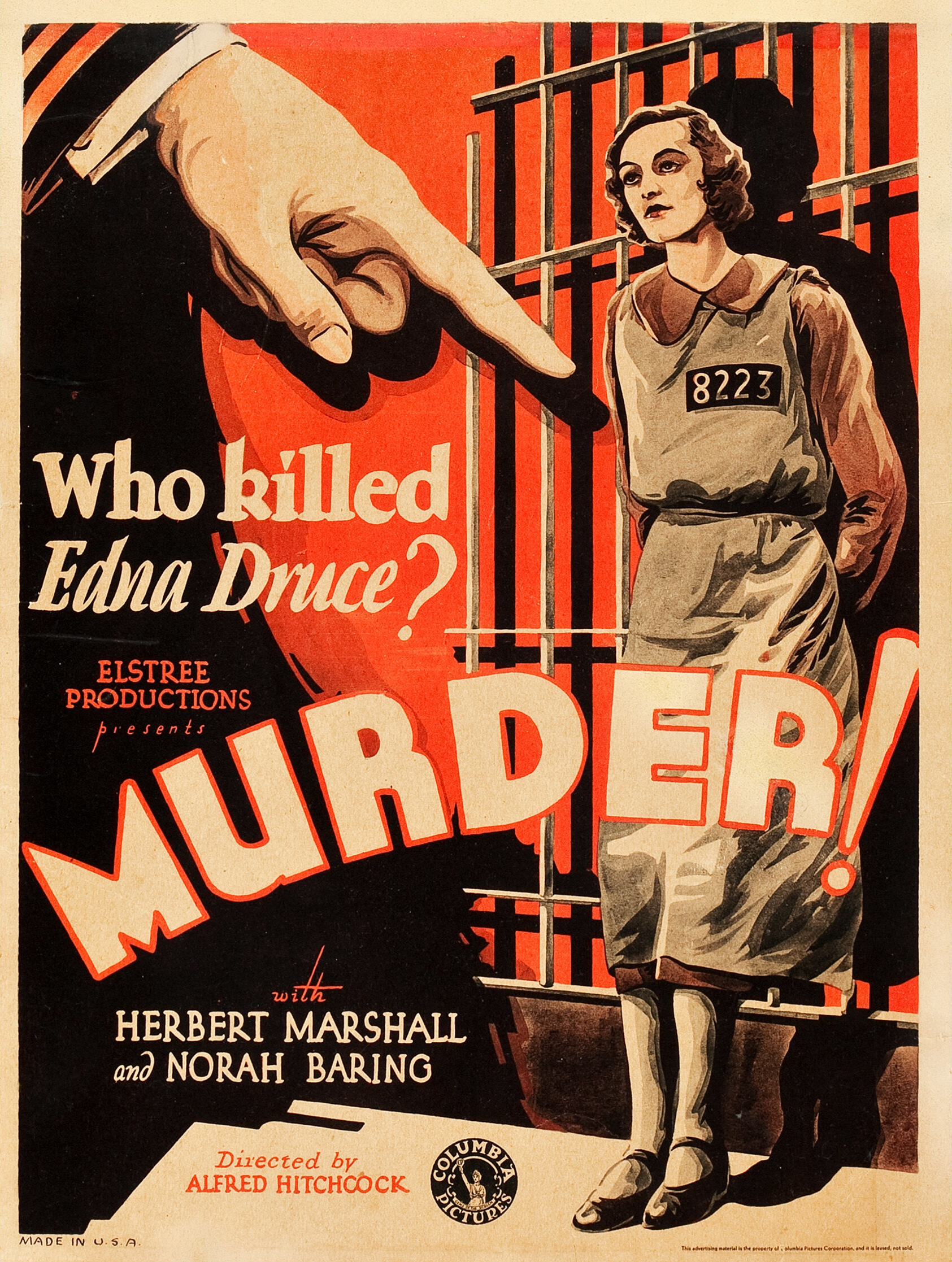
- American theatrical release poster
- Directed by: Alfred Hitchcock
- Screenplay by: Alfred Hitchcock; Walter Mycroft; Alma Reville
- Based on: Enter Sir John by Clemence Dane; Helen Simpson
- Produced by: John Maxwell (uncredited)
- Starring: Herbert Marshall; Norah Baring
- Cinematography: J. J. Cox
- Edited by: Rene Marrison (under the supervision of Emile de Ruelle)
- Music by: John Reynders (musical director)
- Production company: British International Pictures
- Distributed by: Wardour Films
- Release date: 31 July 1930
- Running time: 102 minutes
- Country: United Kingdom
- Language: English
- Budget: $200,000
- Box office: $600,000 (est.)

Murder! is a 1930 British mystery thriller film co-written and directed by Alfred Hitchcock, and starring Herbert Marshall, Norah Baring and Edward Chapman. Written by Hitchcock, his wife Alma Reville, and Walter C. Mycroft, based on the 1928 novel Enter Sir John by Clemence Dane and Helen Simpson, it is Hitchcock's third all-talkie film, after Blackmail (1929) and Juno and the Paycock (1930).

== Plot ==
Murder! (1930)

Diana Baring, a young actress in a travelling theatre troupe, is found in a daze with blood on her clothes, sitting by the murdered body of another young actress, Edna Druce. The poker used to commit the murder is at Diana's feet, but she has no memory of what happened during the minutes that the crime was committed. The two young women are thought to have been rivals, and the police arrest her. Diana withholds some important information deliberately, to protect something about the identity of a man that she will not name.

At her trial, most of the jury are certain she is guilty. One or two feel that she may have a severe mental illness which means that she really does have no memory of killing the other woman, but they are convinced that she should still be hanged lest she strike again. One juror, Sir John Menier, a celebrated actor-manager, seems sure she must be innocent, but is brow-beaten into voting "guilty" along with the rest of the jury. Diana is imprisoned, and awaits hanging.

Sir John feels responsible, as he had recommended that Diana take the touring job in order for her to get more experience. He discovers Diana has been a fan of his since childhood, and considers her far too honest and straightforward to be a criminal of any kind. Using skills he has learned in the theatre, Sir John investigates the murder with the help of the stage manager Ted Markham and his wife Doucie. They narrow the possible suspects down to a male actor in the troupe, Handel Fane.

During a prison visit with Baring, Sir John learns Fane's secret: he is half-caste and passing as white, and Druce had threatened to expose him to Diana, with whom he was in love, neither of them knowing that Diana already knew this. Sir John cunningly tries to lure a confession out of Fane, by asking him to audition for a new play he has been writing. John describes a plot closely resembling the murder, and Fane realises that they know he committed the crime and understand how and why he did it. Fane leaves without confessing and returns to his previous job as a transvestite trapeze performer in a circus. Sir John and the others go there to confront him again. During Fane's performance, he looks down and sees them waiting. Despairing, he knots his access rope into a noose, slips it over his head, and jumps to his death. Sir John and Markham discover Fane had written a confession to the murder before his suicide.

At the film's conclusion, Diana is shown free and glamorously dressed in a white fur, entering a beautiful room and being welcomed warmly by Sir John, who receives her lovingly. The camera pulls back and reveals this is the last scene of a new play, possibly the new play, in which Diana stars opposite Sir John. They kiss as the curtain falls.

== Cast ==
- Herbert Marshall as Sir John Menier
- Norah Baring as Diana Baring
- Phyllis Konstam as Doucie Markham
- Edward Chapman as Ted Markham
- Miles Mander as Gordon Druce
- Esmé Percy as Handel Fane
- Donald Calthrop as Ion Stewart
- Esme V. Chaplin as prosecuting counsel
- Amy Brandon-Thomas as defending counsel
- Joynson Powell as judge
- S. J. Warmington as Bennett
- Marie Wright as Miss Mitcham
- Hannah Jones as Mrs Didsome
- Una O'Connor as Mrs Grogram
- Alfred Hitchcock as man walking with female companion in the foreground while Edward Chapman is speaking to Herbert Marshall and Phyllis Konstam [uncredited]
- Gus McNaughton as Tom Trewitt [uncredited]

Members of the Jury

- R. E. Jeffrey as foreman
- Alan Stainer
- Kenneth Kove
- Guy Pelham Boulton
- Violet Farebrother
- Clare Greet
- Drusilla Wills
- Robert Easton
- William Fazan
- George Smythson
- Ross Jefferson
- Picton Roxborough

== Production ==
The film was made by British International Pictures. It was originally to be released under the same title as the novel, Enter Sir John, but this was changed to the simpler Murder! during shooting. A number of changes were made from the book, including altering the names of the two principal characters. The film's sets were designed by the art director John Mead. Hitchcock makes his cameo appearance in the film as a man walking past the murder victim's house.

The portrayal of the character Sir John Mernier was loosely based on that of the actor Gerald du Maurier, who was a friend of Hitchcock. Hitchcock later adapted two novels and one short story written by du Maurier's daughter Daphne du Maurier: Jamaica Inn (1939), Rebecca (1940) and The Birds (1963).

The German language version of the film, Mary (1931), was shot simultaneously on the same set with German-speaking actors. Miles Mander reprised his role as Gordon Druce in Mary, though the character's name was changed to Gordon Moore.

== Music ==
In addition to the original music composed by John Reynders, the film uses the opening of Richard Wagner's Tristan und Isolde prelude in a radio broadcast Sir John is listening to during the shaving scene.

For the filming, an orchestra played the music live on the set. Hitchcock described the filming of this scene to François Truffaut in the book-length interview Hitchcock/Truffaut. In the early days of sound film, there was no way to post-dub sound, so Hitchcock had Herbert Marshall's voice recorded on a phonograph record, which was played back during the filming of the scene, while the orchestra played the "radio" music live.

== Copyright status and home media ==
Restored releases have appeared on DVD, Blu-ray and video on demand services from Optimum in the UK, Lionsgate and Kino Lorber in the US, and others. It entered the public domain in the United States on 1 January 2026.

== Bibliography ==
- Chandler, Charlotte. It's only a movie: Alfred Hitchcock : a personal biography. First Applause, 2006.
- Yacowar, Maurice. Hitchcock's British Films. Wayne State University Press, 2010.
