= Hamilton (play) =

1917 play by Mary Hamlin and George Arliss

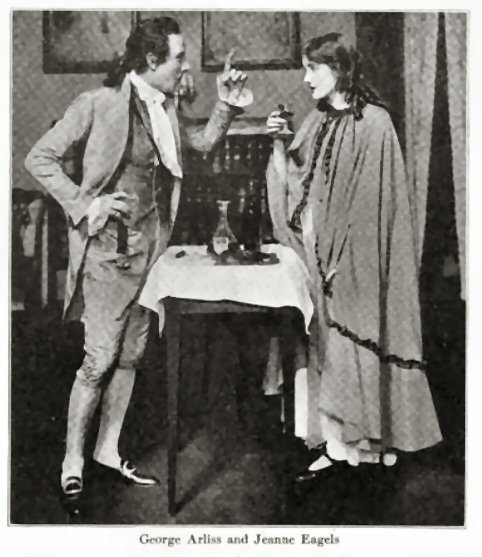
- George Arliss and Jeanne Eagles in Hamilton
- Original language: English
- Written by: Mary P. Hamlin; George Arliss
- Characters: Alexander Hamilton; Thomas Jefferson; James Monroe; William B. Giles; General Philip Schuyler; Count Talleyrand; James Reynolds; Zekial; Chief Justice John Jay; Colonel Lear; Citizen; Mrs. Betsy Hamilton; Angelica Church; Mrs. Maria Reynolds; Mrs. Zachery Whalen
- Genre: Prose
- Setting: The Exchange Coffee House, Philadelphia; Alexander Hamilton's house, Philadelphia.

Premiere
- Date: September 17, 1917
- Place: Knickerbocker Theater; New York City

Hamilton is a 1917 Broadway play about American Founding Father Alexander Hamilton, written by Mary P. Hamlin and George Arliss. It was directed by Dudley Digges and starred Arliss in the title role. It follows the attempts of Hamilton to establish a new financial structure for the United States following the Confederation Period and the establishment of a new Constitution in 1787.

Mary Hamlin, then a 46-year-old high society woman and mother of four, claimed that playwriting was her "secret desire."

In 1931, the film Alexander Hamilton was released. It was based on Hamlin's play and Arliss reprised the title role.

== Cast ==
- George Arliss as Alexander Hamilton
- Carl Anthony as Thomas Jefferson
- Hardee Kirkland as James Monroe
- John D. Ravold as William B. Giles
- George Woodward as General Philip Schuyler
- Guy Favieres as Count Talleyrand
- Pell Trenton as James Reynolds
- James O. Barrows as Zekial
- Wilson Day as Chief Justice John Jay
- Harry Maitland as Colonel Lear
- C.M. Van Clief as Citizen
- Florence Arliss as Mrs. Betsy Hamilton
- Marion Barney as Angelica Church
- Jeanne Eagels as Mrs. Maria Reynolds
- Gillian Scaife as Mrs. Zachery Whalen

== History ==
As of July 29, 1916, Hamlin had typewritten and copyrighted a three-act play of 193 pages, entitled The Secretary of the Treasury. However, there does not appear to be a single, subsequent in-print mention of any such Hamlin play, much less any performance or publication thereof. Taking into account both that and the fact that "Secretary of the Treasury" is precisely the office held by the title character of the 1917, four-act play, Hamilton (a play, moreover, whose plot hinges on the protagonist's controversial efforts to place the new nation on a more unified and, thus, stable financial footing), it seems more than likely that Hamilton was simply the 1916 work's final draft; retitled, newly partitioned, and—to a now unquantifiable extent—otherwise revised.

As for Arliss's contribution to the final version, despite the tenor of contemporaneous news stories (many of which failed to even note that there was a collaboration, much less mention Hamlin's name, simply crediting Arliss), at least one paper, the Detroit Free Press, attributed the play's authorship in terms—specifically, "by Mrs. Mary P. Hamlin, with suggestions from Mr. Arliss himself"—roughly comparable to those used by Hamlin in her 1953 memoirs, as quoted by the New York Post in 2016. "Mr. Arliss did little writing of my play. He knew nothing of American politics, did not even know, at first, that Thomas Jefferson was president of the United States." To his credit, as Hamlin later notes, Arliss always insisted that she be the primary credited author, and indignantly demanded as much when the play's initial batch of printed programs had that order reversed. Although Hamlin never specifies the nature of his contributions, she clearly appreciated them.

As I worked on the play with George Arliss, I began to realize what a lifetime of experience amounted to. He was putting his knowledge into my play, even if I did the writing. His suggestions were invaluable but he never wanted me to agree to anything I did not understand. When I told him I was willing to accept his experience whether or not I understood it, he said firmly, 'No. This is your play and nothing must go into it that you do not understand.'

== Plot ==
Near Princeton, New Jersey at the end of the American Revolutionary War, Alexander Hamilton, who has been serving as an officer and aide-de-camp to General George Washington, watches fretfully from a distance while Washington makes his Farewell Address to the Army, promising that the new nation will pay the soldiers for their service. Soon after, Hamilton expresses his concern to the general about how that promise will be fulfilled when each of the thirteen former colonies, now states, has its own trade practices and currencies.

Soon, following the period of the Articles of Confederation, the new Constitution of the United States has been ratified and Washington is serving in Philadelphia as the country's first President with Hamilton as his Secretary of the Treasury. Hamilton is at odds with Anti-Federalists in the government, including Thomas Jefferson and James Monroe, who are fearful that a strong central government will lead to a monarchy or dictatorship. The Anti-Federalists are especially concerned about Hamilton's proposals for a national bank and an Assumption Bill, which would require the federal government to assume the debts incurred by the states during the Revolution, though their arguments with Hamilton are heated but respectful.

In a Philadelphia tavern, Jefferson, Monroe, and former soldiers argue these points with each other and with the French diplomat and statesman Talleyrand, who supports Hamilton's positions and defends his honor. Jefferson tempers his criticisms of Hamilton, explaining to Monroe that he wants Hamilton's support to establish a new capital city for the country that will not be located in the North.

In the meantime, Hamilton has shared his own views with his wife Betsy, whom he deeply loves, and with his father-in-law Philip Schuyler, a former American general and now Senator from New York. When Betsy sails to England to care for an ailing sister, leaving Hamilton on his own, Timothy Roberts, a (fictional) disgruntled veteran, also now a Senator with his own agenda, hatches a plot to undermine people's trust in Hamilton's integrity.

Schuyler calls on Hamilton, finding him hard at work and neglecting to eat. Schuyler tells him that Jefferson and Monroe will be calling to discuss a Residence Bill that would establish the permanent location of the national capital. Their discussion is interrupted by a young mother with a baby who entreats Hamilton for support since her husband still has not been paid the money owed to him for his military service. Hamilton offers her some food and money and sends her off with promises to see that his own legislation is passed. When Jefferson and Monroe arrive, Schuyler, who has advocated for a Northern capital in Albany, New York City, or Philadelphia, listens outside the room. Hamilton is able to maneuver his guests into accepting a compromise: he will support Jefferson's suggestion for a new capital city on the Potomac River, halfway between North and South, in exchange for their support of his National Bank and Assumption Bill. Having agreed to this, Jefferson and Monroe depart but Talleyrand calls, proposing that he and Hamilton go off on a "spree" in the town while Betsy is away. Hamilton thinks better of the idea and remains home when the Frenchman departs.

Alone for the evening, Hamilton answers the door for another caller, Maria Reynolds, who asks him for money that will allow her to leave her abusive husband. She seduces Hamilton into walking her home and invites him upstairs to her room.

Betsy returns home with her now cured sister, and she and Hamilton look forward to peaceful time together, but a delegation including Jefferson and Monroe arrive and Betsy excuses herself. The guests confront Hamilton with accusations that he had been paying money to a James Reynolds, but Hamilton refutes any implication that he was providing Reynolds with valuable financial information, stating the payments were of a private nature. Hamilton finally admits that he was being blackmailed by Reynolds for Hamilton's affair with his wife Maria. When Betsy reenters the room, most of the callers are ready to leave, but Hamilton feels honor-bound to admit to wife and even publicly confess to the nature of his affair.

News of the scandal and Hamilton's own account hit the newspapers, and Betsy prepares to return to her family home in Albany despite her sister's urging to stand by her husband. Before she can leave, Maria Reynolds calls and tells Betsy about how she was used in a political plot to disgrace Hamilton. She too urges Betsy to forgive and stay with her husband.

When a large delegation including Jefferson and Monroe arrives at his house, Hamilton is certain that his bill have been defeated, that he will have to resign from his office, and become an exile. To his surprise, Jefferson informs him that due to Hamilton's integrity, his bill has passed. Hamilton now predicts that the credit and honor of the nation have been established and future prosperity is assured.

== Reception ==
Hamilton opened to positive reviews on Broadway.

A review in the New York Post read, "Congratulations are due to Mary Hamlin and George Arliss upon the cordial public reception accorded to their play 'Hamilton,' upon the occasion of its first production in this city ... The piece is a welcome and, in some respects, notable addition to the small body of genuine American drama. ... it is a real play with real men and women in it, containing an appeal not only to popular taste, but to the attention of the intelligent theatergoer."

Writing in Vogue, critic Clayton Hamilton compared Hamlin's play to prior Arliss vehicles such as Louis N. Parker's Disraeli, for which, he maintained, Arliss's performance was the sole raison d'être. By contrast, "this new piece in itself affords a worthy evening of entertainment and might be played successfully by several other very able actors. [...] The first two acts, before the well-made plot begins to build to a climax, are mainly conversational; but the conversation is admirably written, not only as stage-dialogue, but also as a literary record of the manners of a bygone century." In conclusion, the review quotes Shakespeare, specifically Othello's Act V, Scene II plea to potential biographers, made immediately prior to taking his own life.

Perhaps the most admirable feature of this play is that it "nothing extenuates nor sets down aught in malice." It shows the hero betrayed, in a moment of weakness, into the commission of a very human sin; and yet it shows him, in the outcome, all the more a hero. His fault is neither condoned nor pardoned; but neither is it overemphasized, as if a sin of sex had power to negate the noble qualities of a man of high ideals and pure incentives. [...] There is a moral in this play that is worthy of serious consideration.

== See also ==
- Hamilton, 2015 musical
