= When We Are Married =

Play written by J. B. Priestley

- The three couples in the original cast: clockwise from top left, Raymond Huntley, Lloyd Pearson, Ernest Butcher; Ethel Coleridge, Muriel George, Helena Pickard
- Written by: J. B. Priestley
- Genre: Comedy
- Setting: Sitting room of Alderman Helliwell's house in Clecklewyke, a town in Yorkshire

Premiere
- Date: 1938
- Place: Manchester

When We Are Married is a three-act play by the English dramatist J. B. Priestley, described as "A Yorkshire Farcical Comedy". Written in 1934, it is set about thirty years earlier, and depicts the consequences when three middle-aged couples jointly celebrating their silver weddings are informed that they were not legally married.

== Background and premiere ==
By 1938 J. B. Priestley had established himself as a dramatist, becoming, according to The Oxford Companion to Twentieth-Century Literature in English, "one of the most highly regarded playwrights of his day". His earlier successes included The Good Companions (1931), Dangerous Corner (1932), Laburnum Grove (1933) and Time and the Conways (1937).

Priestley recalled the genesis of the play:

I was writing, very happily and at a furious speed, a farcical comedy that came finally to be called When We Are Married. My wife had given me the germ of the idea when we were crossing from America, for she had found in the ship’s library an oldish volume of French short stories, and one of these stories had amused her by describing how a couple who were celebrating the anniversary of their wedding suddenly discovered they had never been married at all. I had long wanted to write a funny play about the Yorkshire I had known as a boy, thirty years ago; so I took three couples instead of one, made it their silver wedding celebration, sketched in one or two scenes of genuine comedy ... and then, trying to remember every droll thing about that old Yorkshire, I let it rip.

While the play was in preparation the title was changed from the original Wedding Group to When We Are Married, quoting a popular song from The Belle of New York. Under the new title the play opened at the Opera House, Manchester on 19 September 1938, produced and directed by Basil Dean. (The Leeds Mercury, which liked the play, objected mildly that its first performance should surely have been in Yorkshire.)

After a short tour the production opened in the West End of London at the St Martin's Theatre on 11 October 1938. It transferred to the larger Prince's Theatre in March 1939 and ran until 24 June of that year.

=== Original cast ===
- Ruby Birtle – Patricia Hayes
- Gerald Forbes – Richard Warner
- Mrs Northrop – Beatrice Varley
- Nancy Holmes – Betty Fleetwood
- Fred Dyson – Alexander Grandison
- Henry Ormonroyd – Frank Pettingell
- Alderman Joseph Helliwell – Lloyd Pearson
- Maria Helliwell – Muriel George
- Councillor Albert Parker – Raymond Huntley
- Herbert Soppitt – Ernest Butcher
- Clara Soppitt – Ethel Coleridge
- Annie Parker – Helena Pickard
- Lottie Grady – Mai Bacon
- The Rev Clement Mercer – Norman Wooland
- Mayor of Clecklewyke – H. Marsh Dunn

== Plot ==
Alderman Joseph Helliwell and his wife, Maria, are joined at their house in Clecklewyke in the West Riding of Yorkshire by Councillor Albert Parker and his wife, Annie, together with Herbert Soppitt and his wife, Clara. They are celebrating their silver weddings, all three couples having been married on the same day in the same nonconformist chapel in Lane End, Clecklewyke. Their characters quickly become clear: Helliwell and his wife are easy-going, but he is self-satisfied and inclined to infidelity; Parker is a narrow-minded and parsimonious bully and his wife is under his thumb; Soppitt, contrariwise, is bullied by his domineering wife.

The men are all prominent elders of Lane End chapel, and after the celebrations in the dining room, they gather in the sitting room, replete with port and cigars, to confront the chapel organist, Gerald Forbes, whom they intend to sack, because he has been seen walking out with young women, and, worse, is a southerner. Gerald turns the tables by revealing that on holiday he met a church minister, the Rev Francis Beech, who confided that thirty years ago, as a young minister at Lane End, he conducted four marriages – three of them on the same day – under the impression that he was qualified to do so, but, he later discovered, he lacked the requisite licence for it.

The three men are horrified. Their marriage services, conducted by Beech, were invalid. They foresee a scandal, and dread the reaction of Maria, Annie and Clara: "Then t'balloon goes up properly. Talk about a rumpus. You'll 'ear 'em from 'ere to Leeds". Their anxiety is intensified by the discovery that a domestic servant, Mrs Northrop, has been eavesdropping and knows what Gerald has revealed. Worse, a reporter and photographer from the regional paper, Fred Dyson and Henry Ormonroyd, are on the premises, having come to report on the anniversary and take pictures of the three couples. The three men agree that Mrs Northrop must be bribed to secrecy, and the newspaper men bluffed and kept in ignorance. Mrs Northrop tells Maria, Annie and Clara what she has learned.

The couples slowly adjust to finding themselves unmarried. The two downtrodden partners, Herbert Soppitt and Annie Parker, seem on the verge of rekindling the romantic feelings they had for each other before they paired off with Clara and Albert. Herbert rounds on the domineering Clara and asserts himself. Annie does the same to Albert. A convivial barmaid, Lottie arrives. It quickly emerges that she has in the past had an affair with Helliwell, and thinks she can assert the right to become his wife. She is an old flame of Ormonroyd, who tells her and the others that he is married, although he wishes he were not. The ceremony, he says, was at Lane End conducted by Beech. His wife – equally keen as he to become unmarried – has investigated and established that the four weddings conducted by Beech were legally valid because in those days nonconformist weddings had to be certified by a registrar, and this had been duly done. Finding they are married after all, the three couples look forward to a future without domestic tyranny or extramarital infidelity. Ormonroyd takes a group photograph of the three couples and looks forward to life as proprietor of a photographic shop, with the backing of Helliwell and his colleagues.

== Revivals ==
New productions of the play have included:

- 1939 – Broadway premiere, Lyceum Theatre, New York (156 performances).
- 1979 – National Theatre, London, with Leslie Sands and Pat Heywood as the Helliwells, Robin Bailey and Barbara Ferris as the Parkers and Harold Innocent and Joan Sanderson as the Soppitts, and Peter Jeffrey and Phyllida Law as Ormonroyd and Lottie.
- 1985 – Whitehall Theatre, London, with James Grout and Patricia Routledge as the Helliwells, Timothy West and Prunella Scales as the Parkers, Brian Murphy and Elizabeth Spriggs as the Soppitts and Bill Fraser and Patsy Rowlands as Ormonroyd and Lottie.
- 1996 – Chichester Festival Theatre, with Gary Waldhorn and Alison Steadman as the Helliwells, Roger Lloyd Pack and Annette Badland as the Parkers, Paul Copley and Dawn French as the Soppitts and Leo McKern and Shirley Ann Field as Ormonroyd and Lottie.
- 2009 – Guthrie Theater, Minneapolis, US.
- 2010 – Garrick Theatre, London, with David Horovitch and Susie Blake as the Helliwells, Simon Rouse and Michelle Dotrice as the Parkers, Sam Kelly and Maureen Lipman as the Soppitts, and Roy Hudd and Rosemary Ashe as Ormonroyd and Lottie.
- 2014 – Shaw Festival Theatre, Ontario, Canada.
- 2025 – Donmar Warehouse, London, with Marc Wootton, Sophie Thompson, Samantha Spiro, Jim Howick, Siobhan Finneran, John Hodgkinson, Ron Cook, Tori Allen-Martin, Janice Connolly, Rowan Robinson, Reuben Joseph, Leo Wringer

== Radio, television and film ==
BBC Radio broadcast a shortened version of the play in 1940, and full-length versions in 1946, 1948, 1955, 1965, 1981 and 1994 Among the performers were Carleton Hobbs (Parker, 1940), Frank Pettingell (Ormonroyd, 1948, 1955 and 1965), Violet Carson (Maria Helliwell, 1955), Thora Hird (Clara Soppitt, 1965), Deryck Guyler, Helliwell, 1965). The 1994 production featured Michael Jayston and Nicola Pagett as the Helliwells, Alun Armstrong and Gwen Taylor as the Parkers, Alan Bennett and Brenda Blethyn as the Soppitts, and Peter Woodthorpe and Polly James as Ormonroyd and Lottie.

In November 1938 When We Are Married became the first play to be televised in its entirety from a theatre when BBC Television relayed the complete performance between 8.30 and 10.50 pm on 16 November. BBC Television broadcast studio adaptations of the play in 1949, 1951, 1957, 1964, 1975 and 1987. Among those taking part in the first four of these were Patricia Hayes (Ruby, 1949), Joan Hickson (Mrs Northrop, 1949), Peter Cushing (Gerald, 1951), Frank Pettingell (Ormonroyd, 1951 and 1957), Raymond Huntley (Parker, 1951), Violet Carson (Maria Helliwell, 1957) and Wilfred Brambell (Soppitt, 1957).

The 1975 television adaptation featured John Stratton and Beryl Reid as the Helliwells, Eric Porter and Patricia Routledge as the Parkers, Richard Pearson and Thora Hird as the Soppitts, Shirley Steedman as Ruby, Sheila Burrell as Mrs Northrop, Ronnie Barker as Ormonroyd and Sheila Reid as Lottie. The 1987 version featured Peter Vaughan and Patricia Routledge as the Helliwells, Timothy West and Prunella Scales as the Parkers, Bernard Cribbins and Rosemary Leach as the Soppitts, Sue Devaney as Ruby, Liz Smith as Mrs Northrop, Joss Ackland as Ormonroyd and Patsy Rowlands as Lottie.

A film adaptation was released in 1943 by British National Films

== Sources ==
- Braine, John (1979). J. B. Priestley. New York: Barnes and Noble. ISBN 978-0-06-490642-5. OCLC 1200471217.
- Priestley, J. B. (1949). "When We Are Married: A Yorkshire Farcical Comedy". Plays: Volume II. London: Heinemann. OCLC 2136088.
