= While Parents Sleep =

While Parents Sleep may refer to:

- While Parents Sleep (play), a 1932 comedy play by Anthony Kimmins
- While Parents Sleep (film), a 1935 British comedy film, based on the play
