= The Door with Seven Locks =

The Door with Seven Locks may refer to:

- The Door with Seven Locks (novel), a novel by Edgar Wallace
- The Door with Seven Locks (1940 film), a 1940 British film adaptation
- The Door with Seven Locks (1962 film), a 1962 German film adaptation
