= Edith Money Maturin =

British writer (1860–1945)

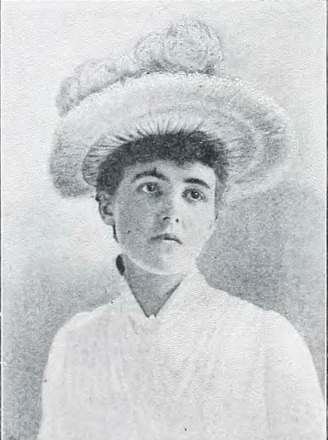
- Money Maturin in 1898
- Born: 25 June 1860; Naini Tal, British India
- Died: 8 October 1945 (aged 85); London, England, UK
- Occupations: Writer; journalist
- Spouses: Fred Maturin (m. 1882, divorced); Cecil Porch (divorced)
- Children: 3 including: Eric Maturin
- Writing career
- Pen name: Mrs. Fred Maturin; Edith Cecil-Porch
- Genres: Travel literature; orientalism; science fiction

Edith Emily Money Maturin Porch (née Money; 25 June 1860 – 8 October 1945), known by the pseudonyms Mrs. Fred Maturin and Edith Cecil-Porch, was a British travel writer, novelist, journalist, and magazine writer.

== Biography ==
Money Maturin was born Edith Emily Money on 25 June 1860 in Naini Tal, British India (present-day Nainital, India) to Lieutenant Colonel Edward James D'oyly Thrale Money and Georgina Mary Money (née Russell). In 1882, she married Colonel Fred Maturin in Darjeeling. They would have three children, including actor Eric Bagot Maturin. She separated from Maturin and had an affair with Lt. Colonel Cecil Porch after they met in Rhodesia. The Maturins had a public divorce proceeding and she and Porch had a short-lived marriage. After her divorce she continued to publish under her married name and was also identified by the name Edith Cecil-Porch.

Many of her works were exotic and orientalising accounts of her childhood in India or hunting expeditions in Africa. She also published the early science fiction story "Our Animated Flat” (The Strand, July 1903), a humorous account of household technology. Her book Rachel Comforted (1920) purported to be a series of spirit communications from 1901 and 1902 with her then-recently deceased son Gordon.

On 8 October 1945, Money Maturin died in London aged 85.

== Bibliography ==
- The Thin Red Line of Heroes. London: G. Richards, 1903.
- Petronel of Paradise. London: E. Nash, 1907.
- Petticoat Pilgrims on Trek. London: E. Nash, 1909.
- Adventures beyond the Zambesi, of the O’Flaherty, the Insular Miss, the Soldier Man, and the Rebel-Woman. London: Eveleigh Nash, 1913.
- Rachel Comforted: Conversations of a Mother in the Dark with her Child in the Light. London: Hutchinson & Co., 1920.
