= Feathered Serpent (disambiguation) =

The Feathered Serpent is a major deity in various Mesoamerican religions.

Feathered Serpent or The Feathered Serpent may also refer to:

- The Feathered Serpent (1934 film), a British film
- The Feathered Serpent (1948 film), an American film
- The Feathered Serpent (TV series), a British television series
- The Feathered Serpent, a 1927 novel by Edgar Wallace
- The Feathered Serpent, a 1981 novel by Scott O'Dell
- Kuviqu or Feathered Serpent I, a raft built and captained by Gene Savoy
  - Feathered Serpent II, a ship captained by Gene Savoy
  - Ophir or Feathered Serpent III, a ship captained by Gene Savoy
