= Jack Barty =

English actor (1888–1942)

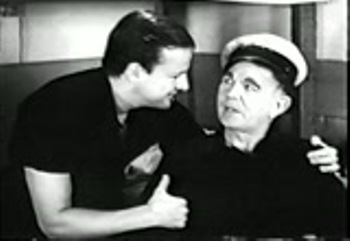
Barry Norton and Jack Barty as "Captain Jackson" in Devil Monster (1946), a re-issued version of The Sea Fiend (1936)

Jack Barty (born John Walter Bartholomew; 31 December 1888 – 25 November 1942) was an English variety show comedian and film actor.

Born in Wandsworth, London, he made his first stage appearance as part of a double act in 1907. After serving in the First World War, he resumed his career as a comic entertainer, billed as "The Burly Burlesquer". He became well known for his performances in the revue Our Liz in 1922, and at the end of its run toured in South Africa, Australia and the U.S.. He returned to musical comedy in London in the early 1930s, and became an early member of the "Crazy Gang", with whom he appeared at the 1933 Royal Variety Performance.

He also had a successful film career in many British films during the 1930s. He was a prominent member of the Grand Order of Water Rats.

He died in Streatham, London, in 1942, at the age of 53.

== Partial filmography ==
- This Is the Life (1933)
- Oliver the Eighth (1934)
- My Song Goes Round the World (1934)
- In Town Tonight (1935)
- It's in the Bag (1936)
- The Sea Fiend (1936)
- All In (1936)
- Feather Your Nest (1937)
- Talking Feet (1937)
- Stepping Toes (1938)
- Take a Chance (1937)
- What Would You Do, Chums? (1939)
- Gaslight (1940) as Chairman of Music Hall
