= Maude T. Howell =

American screenwriter

- Born: Maude Theresa Howell; July 26, 1887; Los Angeles, California
- Died: October 24, 1964 (aged 77); New Orleans, Louisiana
- Education: Stanford University
- Occupation(s): Screenwriter, assistant director, producer

Maude T. Howell (1887-1964) was an American screenwriter, producer, and assistant director active primarily during the 1930s. She was one of few women to hold an assistant directing position at the time.

== Biography ==
Maude was a Los Angeles native born to John Howell and Mary Tappanier. She attended Stanford University, where she studied theater and acted in plays, graduating in 1911.

After graduation, she worked as the drama teacher at Manual Arts High School in Los Angeles before becoming a stage manager at a stock company in Detroit. She became stage manager at George Arliss's company in 1923, and had ambitions of becoming a producer (another position women weren't represented in at the time). She worked with Arliss in the U.S. and in London for five years.

During her association with Arliss, who had gotten involved in the movie industry, she began writing scripts for the screen. One of her first credited efforts was on the 1930 adaptation of The Green Goddess. She'd also take on work as an assistant director and producer at the company as the decade wore on, due to her longstanding association with Arliss, not always receiving credit for these roles.

They both retired by the end of the 1940s, and Howell died in New Orleans, Louisiana in 1964.

== Selected filmography ==
As screenwriter:

- Man of Affairs (1936)
- East Meets West (1936)
- Mister Hobo (1935)
- Cardinal Richelieu (1935)
- The Last Gentleman (1934)
- The House of Rothschild (1934)
- Voltaire (1933)
- The Working Man (1933)
- The King's Vacation (1933)
- A Successful Calamity (1932)
- The Expert (1932)
- The Man Who Played God (1932)
- Alexander Hamilton (1931)
- The Millionaire (1931)
- Old English (1930)
- The Green Goddess (1930)

As assistant director:

- Doctor Syn (1937)
- Man of Affairs (1936)
- East Meets West (1936)
- Mister Hobo (1935)
- The House of Rothschild (1934) (uncredited)
- The Last Gentleman (1934)
- Old English (1930) (uncredited)
