= The Bells Go Down =

1943 film by Basil Dearden

- Theatrical poster
- Directed by: Basil Dearden
- Written by: Roger MacDougall and Stephen Black (novel)
- Produced by: Michael Balcon
- Starring: Tommy Trinder; James Mason
- Narrated by: Leo Genn
- Music by: Roy Douglas
- Release date: 17 May 1943
- Running time: 90 minutes
- Country: United Kingdom
- Language: English

The Bells Go Down is a 1943 British black-and-white comedy-drama film directed by Basil Dearden and starring Tommy Trinder, James Mason, Philip Friend and Mervyn Johns. It was written by Roger MacDougall and Stephen Black, produced by Michael Balcon and made by Ealing Studios.

The reference in the title is to the alarm bells in the fire station that "go down" when a call to respond is made.

The film is an ensemble piece that covers the period between 27 August 1939 and 9 September 1940, when World War II had begun and London was subjected to aerial bombing, and is a tribute to the solidarity of not just those engaged in service, but among the British people as a whole.

== Plot ==
On 3 September 1939, at the start of World War II, several East End Londoners join the London County Council Auxiliary Fire Service. Tommy Turk is a light-hearted gambler who avoids work, living with his mother who runs a local fish and chip shop. Tommy has bought a greyhound pup he names "Short Head" and hopes to race. Bob Matthews is a newcomer to the East End who just lost his job and has to postpone his wedding to Nan Harper as a result. Tommy and Bob meet in The Hopvine, a pub run by Ma and Pa Robbins, whose son Ted is a fireman with the London Fire Brigade. Ted's girl Susie has just joined the brigade as a dispatcher, but Ma Robbins cannot hide her thinly disguised disapproval of Susie's love of dance halls. The Army will not accept new enlistments, so Tommy persuades Bob to join the AFS with him. Sam, a small-time thief of barrels of Guinness, inadvertently joins the service while trying to avoid the clutches of Eastchapel Police Constable O'Brien, who dogs him persistently. The three are assigned immediately to the "Q" sub-station of the East End's District 21, set up in a school to train under Ted.

"Q sub" responds to its first call at Christmas. Although the fire is out when they arrive, crusty District Officer MacFarlane is impressed with Ted's efforts and posts him, along with Tommy, Sam and Bob, as a crew at District 21's superintendent's station. Nan and Bob finally marry and take a flat near Benjamin's Wharf. She becomes pregnant, suffering fainting spells, and befriends Ma Turk. Ted is reluctant to marry, so Susie goes dancing with ladies' man Tommy as a means of making Ted jealous, while Ted teases Tommy for his apparent aversion to fighting fires. Tommy races Short Head, who repeatedly loses, costing not just Tommy, but his fellow firemen who have wagered on her. Sam continues to steal barrels of Guinness, but PC O'Brien begins to close in.

In August 1940 the Battle of Britain is raging, but London has not yet been bombed. The 21-Q crew have yet to fight a serious fire and have become sensitive about it. Tommy discovers Short Head has been losing because Ma Turk has been feeding her doughnuts, and he enters her in a high-stakes race on 7 September, planning to wager all his money. His plans are interrupted that afternoon by the first massive German air raid on London, which targets the East End Docks. The widespread fires cause chaos as water lines are broken and AFS crews are pressed into front-line service. Ted saves Tommy's life by using a high-pressure hose to knock him away from a delay-action bomb just before it explodes. The second night of the Blitz, the 21-Q crew, still struggling to bring the docks fire under control, have forged bonds with their full-time counterparts and officers in action. Ted's parents are unaccounted for, and Susie goes to find them. The Hopvine has been bombed, but through Susie's persistence, they are found in the cellar and rescued. The next morning, during a break, Tommy learns that Short Head won her race, but he forgot to place the wager.

The third night German bombers return, creating a huge fire at Benjamin's Wharf, and the District 21 crews are shifted there. Bob finds himself fighting a warehouse fire from inside his own burning flat, which has been declared expendable. However he takes comfort in the knowledge that Nan, about to give birth, is safe with Ma Turk at St John's Hospital. PC O'Brien arrives to arrest Sam, but a bomb explosion blows him into the River Thames, where Sam rescues him from drowning. Soon they learn that St John's Hospital is also on fire. Chief MacFarlane transfers Ted's crew to the hospital fire and enters the burning building to direct efforts to save the main building. Bob learns that Nan is safe and he has a new son. Another bomb strikes the hospital, trapping Chief MacFarlane. Tommy beats Ted to the ladder and finds the chief, but the building collapses, killing both.

Some time after the fire is out, all the survivors and their families gather in the bombed local church to christen the baby, who Nan and Bob have decided to name "Tommy".

== Cast ==
- Leo Genn as narrator
- Tommy Trinder as Tommy Turk
- James Mason as Ted Robbins
- Philip Friend as Bob Matthews
- Mervyn Johns as Sam
- William Hartnell as Brooks
- Finlay Currie as District Officer MacFarlane
- Philippa Hiatt as Nan Matthews
- Meriel Forbes as Susie
- Beatrice Varley as Ma Turk
- Norman Pierce as Pa Robbins
- Muriel George as Ma Robbins
- Richard George as PC O'Brien
- Charles Victor as Bill, Dunkirk survivor (uncredited)
- Ralph Michael as Bill's friend, Dunkirk survivor (uncredited)
- Frederick Piper as police sergeant (uncredited)

== Production ==
Although the plot employs fictitious landmarks and localities, many of the incidental shots were taken at actual fires caused by the air raids on London in the previous two years.

The score was originally to be composed by William Walton, but for various reasons, possibly including that he had lost his own home in the Blitz, he offered it to his musical assistant Roy Douglas.

== Reception ==
The Monthly Film Bulletin wrote: "Semi-documentary comedy drama. ... It achieves an authentic atmosphere, and Basil Dearden, the director, has insisted on adequate characterisation and avoided the pitfalls of mock heroics. Naturally Tommy Trinder holds the centre of the screen, but he is well seconded by James Mason and Finlay Currie as the regular firemen. Philippa Hiatt shows that she has some drama in her make-up. For the rest the cast is adequate, even if it shows up our lack of competent actresses. Nevertheless the film is well above the average, and thanks to a good story, good direction and the tricks of cinematography, achieves its effect."

Kine Weekly wrote: "Spectacular tribute to the N.F.S. set in London's East End during the opening days of the war and the early ones of the blitz. Its fictional narrative attempts to cross-section life in an A.F.S. unit and in the surrounding civilian community, but its characters are with few exceptions stereotyped and its direction orthodox, so that its drama and propaganda are expressed mainly in time-honoured clichés. Nevertheless, the inimitable Cockney humour of Tommy Trinder helps considerably to cloak its ingenuousness."

Variety wrote: "Current film must compete with Fires Were Started, a government documentary with a similar basic idea which was released only a few weeks ago. Both depict the activities of life in the London Auxiliary Fire Service. But the first one out was more legitimate in that it was portrayed by actual members of the service. ... Viewed as mere low comedy, The Bells Go Down ambles along amiably. There is a running commentary patterned on the lines of those made familiar by Quentin Reynolds, and the fire scenes alternate with the wisecracking of Tommy Trinder, which are often without provocation. Thrillingly effective conflagration scenes deserve a large share of the honors."

Time Out wrote: "Uncomfortable war effort from Ealing, semi-documentary in intent but getting bogged down in silly histrionics ... Horribly patronising in its view of the humble doing their bit for Britain (even the crook turns up trumps), and knocked sideways as a tribute to the Auxiliary Fire Service by Humphrey Jennings' Fires Were Started, coincidentally released the same month."
