= Hazel Ascot =

English child actress (born 1928)

Hazel Ascot (born 10 May 1928) was a tap-dancing British child-star in the 1930s who was billed as the "British Shirley Temple". She starred in two films before abandoning her theatrical career.

== Career ==
Ascot was born in Manchester, the daughter of Duggie Ascot, who created a dance troupe with his family called "The Petite Ascots". Film director John Baxter discovered Hazel at her father's dance studio in London. She was made the star of his upcoming film Talking Feet (1937), a "quota quickie" about a girl's attempt to raise money for a local hospital by putting on a show. The film was a success and so Hazel was given another starring role in Stepping Toes (1938), about a child dancer who wins a contest and goes on to star in a London show.

After these films, it was intended that Hazel would appear in a third feature, a more expensive venture, to be shot in colour, provisionally titled "Hazel of the Sawdust" but the outbreak of World War II made this untenable.

Ascot was one of two child stars at the time who were billed as the "British Shirley Temple", the other being Binkie Stuart.

== Later life ==
In 1943, Ascot appeared in "Magic Carpet", a West End revue at the Princes Theatre, alongside Kay Kendall and her sister Kim. After the war she abandoned performing to marry her childhood sweetheart Peter Banting, an architect. Hazel worked as a school-teacher and had three children. She was interviewed about her memories of the film studios on several occasions, most notably for a 1982 episode of the Anglia Television series Movie Memories and in 1994 at the British Film Institute.

== Appreciation society ==
In 1970, the Hazel Ascot Appreciation Society was created by Tony Willis, who tracked Ascot down via her brother. The society supported events for budding child performers. Though originally a genuine appreciation society, by the late 1990s it had become a front for a network of paedophiles. In 2002, a series of arrests were made of members of the society. According to the police, paedophiles "used the fan club as a cover to communicate with each other via the internet." The police emphasised that Ascot was not aware of or associated in any way with the activities of the gang, but "though she has nothing to do with these deviants, she has become an icon for paedophiles."
