= John Davenport (critic) =

English critic and book reviewer

John Lancelot Agard Bramhall Davenport (10 May 1908 – 27 June 1966) was an English critic and book reviewer who wrote for, amongst other publications, The Observer and The Spectator. He was a mentor to the critic Nora Sayre.

== Life ==
The son of Robert Davenport (known as "Robin" or "Arthur"), a self-described "dramatic author", writer and illustrator of children's stories, and writer of lyrics for popular songs (including as a collaborator with H. G. Pelissier on an adaptation of The Follies) and the actress Muriel George (who later married the actor Ernest Butcher), Davenport was primarily raised at Barons Court by his grandmother, and subsequently educated at St Paul's and Corpus Christi College, Cambridge, (at which he opted to study rather than taking up a history scholarship he had won to Hertford College, Oxford). He would later compare his childhood to the story of Compton Mackenzie's Sinister Street. Davenport's great-grandfather was the composer and musicologist Sir George Macfarren; Macfarren's daughter had married Francis ("Frank") William Davenport, a professor at the Guildhall School of Music and Royal Academy of Music, who was a collaborator, formerly pupil, of MacFarren. The Davenports were mainly clergymen, originally from Cheshire, and kinsmen of the Davenports of Bramall Hall, at Bramhall, Greater Manchester (historically Cheshire).

After coming down from Cambridge, Davenport worked for MGM as a screenwriter with F. Scott Fitzgerald; it was at this time he became acquainted with Nora Sayre's family. He taught at Stowe School in the 1940s, and worked for the BBC at Bush House as Head of the Belgian Section (he spoke fluent French, having lived there for some time)

He was a close friend of Dylan Thomas, with whom, in 1941, he wrote The Death of the King's Canary, a satirical detective novel (it remained unpublished until 1976). Up at Cambridge as a contemporary of William Empson, Davenport was entrusted in 1947 with the only manuscript copy of Empson's The Face of the Buddha, which he subsequently misplaced whilst drunk. Although Davenport finally admitted to Empson in 1952 that he thought he had left the manuscript in a taxi, in fact he had given it to the Tamil poet, Tambimuttu, and it eventually made its way to publication many years later. Davenport was also a friend of the novelist Malcolm Lowry, since their Cambridge days.

Davenport was renowned for his physical strength and willingness to employ that strength as a countermeasure to what he considered "impertinence" in others; he had been an all-in wrestler, as well as a noted boxer whilst at Cambridge, making a living for a time as a fairground boxer. One anecdote (related slightly differently by Paul Johnson and Nora Sayre) has him, whilst at either the Savage Club or the Savile Club, hoisting a man (per Johnson, Lord Maugham, the Lord Chancellor and brother of the author Somerset Maugham; per Sayre, a bishop) six feet into the air and depositing him upon a mantelpiece, from which descent proved complicated. Davenport was duly expelled from the club. In contrast to this bellicose approach, Davenport was considered "one of the most remarkable and talented men of his generation", with an "appreciation of literature ... equalled only by his insight into the wearisome condition of humanity" and "exhilarating" wit.

In 1934, Davenport married Clemency (known as "Clement") Hale, a painter and set designer, daughter of Swinburne Hale, an American lawyer, and his wife Beatrice, née Forbes-Robertson, the niece of the actor Sir Johnston Forbes-Robertson. Following their divorce, Davenport married Marjorie Morrison. He had children from both marriages, including a son, Roger, an author. In the 1960s, following difficulties with alcoholism, Davenport retired to the country where his mother lived, and died shortly afterwards.
