= Key to Harmony =

- Reginald Purdell, Belle Chrystall and Fred Conyngham in the film
- Directed by: Norman Walker
- Written by: John B. Wilson (novel); Basil Mason
- Produced by: Anthony Havelock-Allan
- Starring: Belle Chrystall; Fred Conyngham; Reginald Purdell; Olive Sloane
- Production company: British & Dominions Film Corporation
- Distributed by: Paramount British Pictures
- Release date: March 1935
- Running time: 68 minutes
- Country: United Kingdom
- Language: English

Key to Harmony is a 1935 British drama film directed by Norman Walker and starring Belle Chrystall, Fred Conyngham and Reginald Purdell. It was written by Basil Mason based on the novel Suburban Retreat by John B. Wilson. The film was a quota quickie made at British and Dominions Elstree Studios for release by Paramount Pictures. Art direction was by Hylton R. Oxley.

== Preservation status ==
The British Film Institute National Archive holds a collection of ephemera and stills but no film or video materials.

== Plot summary ==
A woman's love life is threatened by her career success.

== Cast ==
- Belle Chrystall as Mary Meynell
- Fred Conyngham as Victor Barnett
- Reginald Purdell as Tom Kirkwood
- Olive Sloane as Nonia Sande
- Ernest Butcher as Mr. Meynell
- Muriel George as Mrs. Meynell
- D. A. Clarke-Smith as Rupert Golder
- Cyril Smith as Fred
- Joan Harben
- Jack Knight

== Reception ==
The Daily Film Renter wrote: "Slender plot meanders along to tune of pseudo witty dialogue, while climax, in which hero recovers from infatuation for 'other woman' and attack of swollen head, is cut to conventional pattern. Production values quite good, but subject matter hardly strong enough. Reginald Purdell gives amusing portrayal as cynical architect. Quota support for not too exacting."

Picture Show wrote: "Fred Conyngham gives a convincing performance ... Fair entertainment."

Picturegoer wrote: "Extremely poor story on Seventh Heaven lines, with childish dialogue and deficient in both acting and production qualities. The artistes concerned are so handicapped by the inanity of the characters and the flimsiness of the material that it would be unfair to criticise their performances."
