= East Meets West (1936 film) =

1936 British film by George Pearson

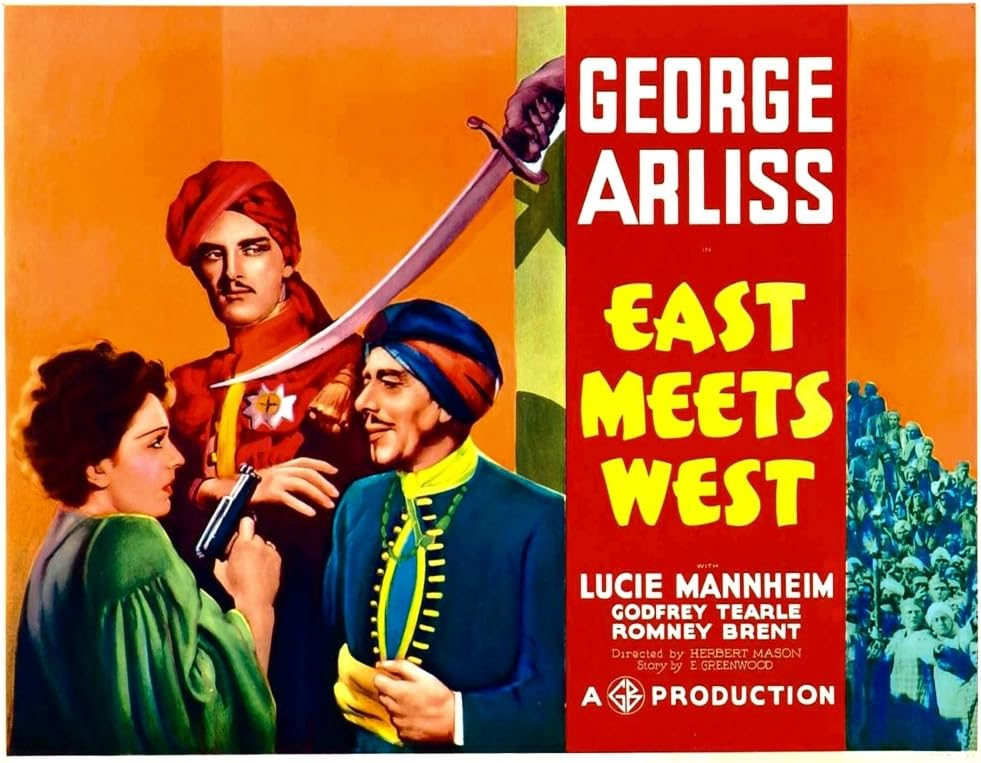
- Lobby card for the film
- Directed by: Herbert Mason; Maude T. Howell (asst.)
- Written by: Edwin Greenwood; Maude T. Howell
- Produced by: Haworth Bromley
- Starring: George Arliss; Lucie Mannheim; Godfrey Tearle; Romney Brent
- Cinematography: Bernard Knowles
- Edited by: Charles Frend
- Music by: Louis Levy; John DH Greenwood
- Production company: Gaumont British
- Distributed by: Gaumont British Distributors
- Release dates: 26 August 1936 (London); 16 October 1936 (USA)
- Running time: 74 minutes
- Country: United Kingdom
- Language: English

East Meets West is a 1936 British drama film directed by Herbert Mason and starring George Arliss, Lucie Mannheim, Godfrey Tearle and John Laurie. It was made at the Lime Grove Studios in London. The film's art direction was by Oscar Friedrich Werndorff.

== Plot ==
A small Middle Eastern state is coveted by the major powers for strategic reasons.

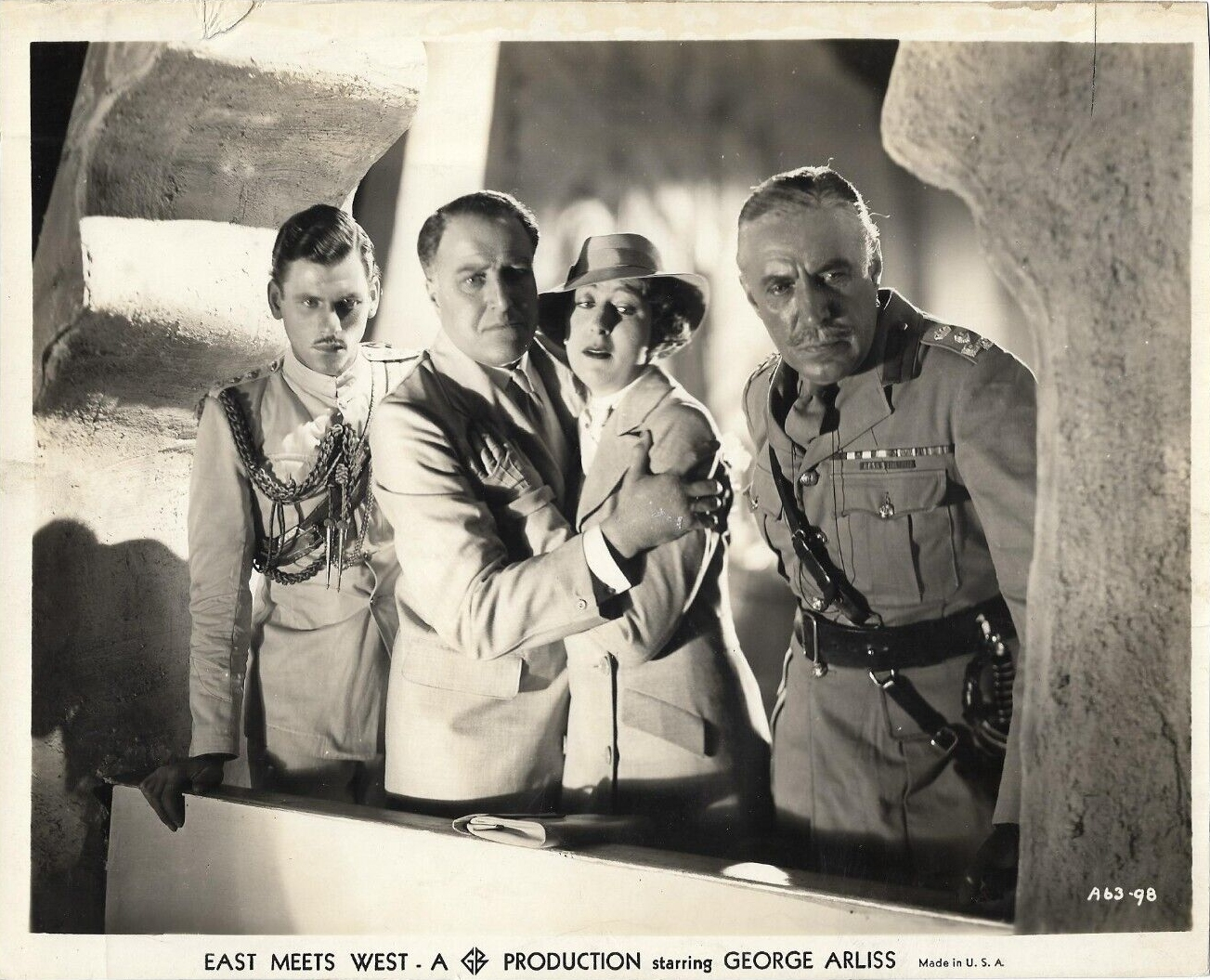
Still of the film

== Cast ==
- George Arliss as Sultan of Rungay
- Lucie Mannheim as Marguerite Carter
- Godfrey Tearle as Sir Henry Mallory
- Romney Brent as Doctor Shagu
- Ballard Berkeley as Nazim
- Ronald Ward as Neville Carter
- Norma Varden as Lady Mallory
- John Laurie as Doctor Fergusson
- O. B. Clarence as Osmin
- Campbell Gullan as Veka
- Eliot Makeham as Goodson
- Peter Gawthorne as Stanton
- Ralph Truman as Abdul
- Patrick Barr as O'Flaherty
- Peter Croft as Crowell

== Reception ==
Writing for The Spectator in 1936, Graham Greene gave the film a very poor review, succinctly warning readers "to avoid [it] like the plague".

== Bibliography ==
- Low, Rachael. Filmmaking in 1930s Britain. George Allen & Unwin, 1985.
- Wood, Linda. British Films, 1927-1939. British Film Institute, 1986.
