= Devil Monster =

- Original theatrical poster
- Directed by: S. Edwin Graham; Juan Duval (El Diablo del Mar only)
- Written by: Thelma Brooks (story); Juan Duval (adaptation); S. Edwin Graham (adaptation); Terry Grey (story); Tom Hubbard (narration)
- Produced by: Adrian Weiss (supervising producer); Louis Weiss (producer)
- Starring: See below
- Cinematography: Herbert Oswald Carleton
- Edited by: Adrian Weiss
- Production company: Louis Weiss Productions
- Distributed by: Excelsior Pictures; Cinexport Films (El Diablo del Mar only)
- Release date: 1936
- Running time: 63 minutes
- Country: United States
- Language: English

Devil Monster (1936) is an American action-adventure horror film directed by S. Edwin Graham. The working title of the film was The Great Manta and it was shown in Great Britain as The Sea Fiend in 1938. Also, a Spanish-language version entitled El diablo del mar, directed by Juan Duval using some of the same actors and footage, was released in the United States in 1936 by Cinexport Films.

An edited version of the film was released in 1946 as Devil Monster, a low-budget South Seas drama spiced up with stock footage inserts including half-dressed native girls who were also featured in the film's trailer. The Hays Code, which banned nudity in American films, apparently tolerated partial nudity in "ethnographic" scenes of "native" life. This version of the film is now in the public domain and is available online at Internet Archive.

== Cast ==
- Barry Norton as Robert Jackson
- Blanche Mehaffey as Louise
- Jack Barty as Capt. Jackson
- Terry Grey as Tiny
- Jack Del Rio as Jose Francisco
- Mary Carr as Mother of Jose
- William Lemuels as Native Chief
- Maya Owalee as Maya
- Donato Cabrera as Malo

== See also ==
- List of films in the public domain in the United States
- List of monster movies
