= Romilly Lunge =

British actor (1904–1994)

- Born: 4 October 1904; London; United Kingdom
- Died: 1 August 1994 (aged 89); Leicestershire, United Kingdom
- Other name: Ernest Romilly Maundrell Lunge
- Occupation: Film actor

Romilly Lunge (1904–1994) was a British film actor. He made a total of 15 films and appeared in many stage plays between 1933 and 1940.

== Career ==
When war broke out Lunge joined the Royal Navy, ending up in Ceylon working on sonar detection. On one occasion, he ended up briefing the future Prince Philip, Duke of Edinburgh on a secret research and development project. After the war, he retired from acting and ran a farm in north Warwickshire.

== Death ==
He died in August 1994 in Leicestershire, England.

== Filmography ==
- The Perfect Flaw (1934)
- Road House (1934)
- The Dictator (1935)
- The Clairvoyant (1935)
- Koenigsmark (1935)
- His Lordship (1936)
- Annie Laurie (1936)
- A Woman Alone (1936)
- While Parents Sleep (1936)
- For Valour (1937)
- A Royal Divorce (1938)
- Sidewalks of London (1938)
- The Mind of Mr. Reeder (1939)
- Traitor Spy (1939)
- The Door with Seven Locks (1940)

== Bibliography ==
- Low, Rachael. History of the British Film: Filmmaking in 1930s Britain. George Allen & Unwin, 1985.
