= The Girl in the Night =

1931 film

- Directed by: Henry Edwards
- Written by: Henry Edwards, Edwin Greenwood
- Produced by: Henry Edwards
- Starring: Henry Edwards; Dorothy Boyd; Sam Livesey
- Production company: Henry Edwards Productions
- Distributed by: Wardour Films
- Release date: 21 July 1931
- Running time: 65 minutes
- Country: United Kingdom
- Language: English

The Girl in the Night is a 1931 British crime film directed by Henry Edwards and starring Edwards, Dorothy Boyd and Sam Livesey. It was written by Edwards and Edwin Greenwood, and made at Elstree Studios as a quota quickie.

== Cast ==
- Henry Edwards as Billie
- Dorothy Boyd as Cecile
- Sam Livesey as Ephraim Tucker
- Reginald Bach as Schmidt
- Eric Maturin as Fenton
- Diana Wilson as Mrs. Fenton
- Charles Paton as Prof. Winthrop
- Harvey Braban as Inspector
- Hal Gordon

== Reception ==
Film Weekly wrote: "The engaging personality of Henry Edwards goes a long way towards disguising the thin material of The Girl in the Night. ... Eric Maturin succeeds in being pleasantly sinister as a crook; Dorothy Boyd weeps delightfully, and Edwards is, of course, calmly and jauntily capable. Moderate entertainment."

Kine Weekly wrote: "Mystery and melodrama are to some extent enlivened by Henry Edwards' cheerful personality. The plot is not intelligent, but carried along by a wave of quick action, and should command the attention of popular audiences. "
