= Stepping Toes =

- Opening titles
- Directed by: John Baxter
- Written by: Barbara K. Emary; Jack Francis; H. Fowler Mear
- Produced by: John Barter
- Starring: Hazel Ascot; Enid Stamp-Taylor; Jack Barty
- Cinematography: Jack Parker
- Edited by: Michael Truman
- Music by: Kennedy Russell
- Production companies: UK Films; Two Cities Films
- Distributed by: British Independent Exhibitors' Distributors
- Release date: 12 September 1938
- Running time: 85 minutes
- Country: United Kingdom
- Language: English

Stepping Toes is a 1938 British musical film directed by John Baxter and starring Hazel Ascot, Enid Stamp-Taylor and Jack Barty. It was written by Barbara K. Emary, Jack Francis and H. Fowler Mear. The screenplay concerns a young girl who achieves her ambition to become a tap dancer.

The film was made by Two Cities Films at Shepperton Studios with sets designed by John Bryan.

== Plot ==
Ageing showman Bob Burnham decides to retire from the traveling fair circuit, and continue only with summer tours of seaside towns. His daughter, who married a lawyer and severed ties with Bob, has even kept her young daughter, Hazel, from knowing who her grandfather is. When Hazel wins a prize at one of Burnham’s talent competitions, it leads to a reunion between Bob and his daughter. Hazel’s father provides the funding for a West End production featuring her. The show becomes a hit, ensuring that the Burnham family name remains known in the show-business world.

== Cast ==
- Hazel Ascot as Hazel Warrington
- Enid Stamp-Taylor as Mrs Warrington
- Jack Barty as Joe
- Edgar Driver as Tich
- Ernest Butcher as Stringer
- Richard Cooper as Kenneth Warrington
- Ivan Samson as Mr Warrington
- Wilson Coleman as Bob Burnham
- John Turnbull as representative
- Jo Masters as chorus

== Reception ==
Kine Weekly wrote: "This is a pure starring vehicle for Hazel Ascot, and exploits her remarkable talent the full. ... Ivan Sampson and Enid Stamp-Taylor as the parents, Wilson Coleman as the old showman, antl Jack arty as his henchman, all play their parts well, but the evening is Hazel's. No great shakes as a singer, she yet manages to put songs over effectively; but her dancing is phenomenal, and her personality winning."

The Daily Film Renter wrote: "Good, homely humour derives irom the antics of Jack Barty, Edgar Driver and Ernest Butcher, the latter giving a gem performance as a perpetually disgruntled pessimist. Enid Stamp-Taylor and Wilson Coleman are others to stand out, while three diminutive tots brought down the house with their crooning, but it is somewhat doubtful whether they were responsible for the melodies that seemingly emanated from their lips."

Picturegoer wrote: "Britain's counterpart to Shirley Temple, Hazel Ascot, exploits her dancing and acting talent well in this simple little story which is mainly designed to exploit her. ... Good performances are given by Wilson Coleman as the old showman and Jack Barty as his henchman, while the parents are soundly played by Ivan Sampson and Enid Stamp-Taylor. Hazel Ascot is not a great singer yet, but she dances very well and has an attractive personality."

Picture Show wrote: "Hazel Ascot's clever tap-dancing, her attractive personality and lack of precociousness, invest this story of a little girl's adventures in a bid for fame as a dancer with much charm. In addition to this, there are many human, appealing touches in the development, the story, and some bright humour. The dances are well staged and photographed, and the supporting cast good."
