= Rush Hour (1941 film) =

- Title screenshot
- Directed by: Anthony Asquith
- Written by: Arthur Boys; Rodney Ackland
- Produced by: Edward Black
- Starring: Muriel George; Hay Petrie
- Cinematography: Arthur Crabtree
- Edited by: Alfred Roome
- Distributed by: Ministry of Information
- Release date: December 1941
- Running time: 6 minutes
- Country: United Kingdom
- Language: English

Rush Hour is a 1941 British Public Information short film made by the wartime Ministry of Information and designed to pass on an important message to cinemagoers in a humorous manner. It was directed by Anthony Asquith, written by Rodney Ackland and Arthur Boys, and produced by Edward Black.

== Scenario ==
The film comprises a series of short comedy sequences, illustrating the various degrees of chaos and confusion arising from public transport being overwhelmed with passengers at peak times. Its twin targets were employers, to whom the desirability of staggered working hours was stressed, and casual leisure travellers, who were exhorted: "Shopping? Visiting? Then get home early at your ease – leave rush-hour seats for workers, please!"

== Cast ==
- Muriel George as Violet
- Joan Sterndale-Bennett as Lil
- Hay Petrie as bus conductor
- Beatrice Varley as Violet's friend
- Charles Victor as bus inspector
- David Keir as man at bus stop
- Robert Brooks Turner as man at bus stop
- Merle Tottenham as woman at bus stop
