= In Town Tonight (film) =

- Trade show advertisement
- Directed by: Herbert Smith
- Produced by: Herbert Smith
- Starring: Jack Barty; Dave Apollon; Billy Merrin
- Cinematography: Charles Van Enger
- Production company: British Lion
- Distributed by: British Lion
- Release date: 24 January 1935
- Running time: 80 minutes
- Country: United Kingdom
- Language: English

In Town Tonight (also known as In Town To-night) is a 1935 British musical film directed by Herbert Smith and starring Jack Barty, Dave Apollon and Billy Merrin. It was made by British Lion at Beaconsfield Studios with art direction was by Andrew Mazzei. First released in 1935, the film was re-issued in 1938.

== Preservation status ==
The British Film Institute National Archive holds no stills or ephemera, and no film or video materials.

== Synopsis ==
A record producer is scouting for new talent for a series of records to be called "In Town Tonight", and commissions an agent to find suitable new acts, and to present their performances in a cabaret show.

== Cast ==
Unless otherwise noted, cast perform as themselves.

- Jack Barty as The Agent
- Finlay Currie as The Manager
- Dave Apollon and his Serenaders
- Billy Merrin and his Commanders
- Howard Jacobs
- The Kneller Hall Military Band
- Stanley Holloway
- Three Radio Rogues
- Wilson Keppel and Betty
- Arthur Prince
- Olive Groves
- The Carson Sisters
- The Sixteen Tiller Girls
- Nora Williams
- Melissa Mason
- Gilbert Russell
- Tessa Deane
- The Dynamites
- The Seven Thunderbolts
- Beryl Orde
- Robert Lively
- Robert Rietty as boy

== Reception ==
The Monthly Film Bulletin wrote: "This picture has been built up on music hall lines, and its greatest weakness is therefore in its story, which makes an unsuccessful attempt to secure good continuity between the various acts the film includes. The individual acts themselves are all well up to standard, and highlights are secured by Stanley Holloway, Arthur Prince, and Wilson Keppel, and Betty. Jack Barty can be best described as compere. The dialogue is definitely weak, but the photography is good. The tempo of the film is decidedly on the slow side, and the film does not approach its climax with much vigour. Good entertainment of its kind."

The Daily Film Renter wrote: "Straightforward screening of well known radio and variety acts. Jack Barty and Dave Apollon are recurring personalities, hot rhythm of latter's band being highlight. Other outstanding turns are Stanley Holloway's Yorkshire songs, tap dancing of Wilson, Keppel and Betty, and singing of Three Radio Rogues and Nora Williams. No flat moments, items following in snappy succession. ... A picture which makes no pretence of being anything but a slickly presented succession of variety items."

Picturegoer wrote: "The radio and music-hall supply a wealth of talent which is well utilised in this series of turns, loosely connected by a slight story. Jack Barty is represented as a collector of talent for a gramophone company – later the compereship is handed over to Dave Apollon, who accompanies the majority of the turns. The items are all good. Outstanding ones include Stanley Holloway's 'The Lion and Albert' and 'With 'er 'ead Tucked Underneath 'er Arm'; a burlesque Egyptian dance by Wilson Keppel and Betty; The Three Radio Rogues, impersonating famous crooners; Melissa Mason's eccentric dance; Arthur Prince's ventriloquial turn; Nora Williams's pleasant crooning, and the superb timing of the Sixteen Tiller Girls."
