= His Lordship (1936 film) =

- Trade ad Kinematograph Weekly, 1936
- Directed by: Herbert Mason; Maude T. Howell (asst.)
- Written by: Neil Grant (play); Edwin Greenwood; Maude T. Howell; L. du Garde Peach
- Produced by: S.C. Balcon
- Starring: George Arliss; Romilly Lunge; Rene Ray; Allan Jeayes
- Cinematography: Günther Krampf
- Edited by: Michael Gordon
- Music by: Louis Levy; Hubert Bath
- Production company: Gaumont British
- Distributed by: Gaumont British Distributors
- Release dates: November 1936 (London); 19 February 1937 (US)
- Running time: 73 minutes
- Country: United Kingdom
- Language: English

His Lordship is a 1936 British drama film directed by Herbert Mason and starring George Arliss, Romilly Lunge and Rene Ray. It was released with the alternative title Man of Affairs in the United States.

== Plot ==
Its plot involves Arliss as a British Foreign secretary swapping identities with his black sheep twin brother (also Arliss), and the rescuing of Britain from war with an Arab nation.

== Production ==
The film was based on the 1931 play The Nelson Touch by Neil Grant. It was made at the Lime Grove Studios in London, with sets designed by art director Alfred Junge.

== Cast ==
- George Arliss as Richard Fraser / Lord Duncaster
- Romilly Lunge as Bill Howard
- Rene Ray as Vera
- Allan Jeayes as Barak
- Jessie Winter as Lady Duncaster
- John Ford as Ibrahim
- Lawrence Anderson as Nahil
- Bernard Merefield as Phillpotts
- John Turnbull as Stevenson
- Basil Gill as Abdullah

== Critical reception ==
TV Guide wrote "The best thing about the film is some nice split-screen work, which has detective Arliss shaking the hand of politician Arliss."

Cinema critic and historian, Tony Sloman for Radio Times said that "[the] film's stage derivation seeps through the whole enterprise, and the combination of Boys' Own heroics and the politics of war is as hard to take today as it probably was then. But Arliss was undeniably a star, and those who only know his historical roles may enjoy seeing him in a contemporary part."

== Bibliography ==
- Low, Rachael. Filmmaking in 1930s Britain. George Allen & Unwin, 1985.
- Wood, Linda. British Films, 1927-1939. British Film Institute, 1986.
