= The Lily (film) =

1926 film by Victor Schertzinger

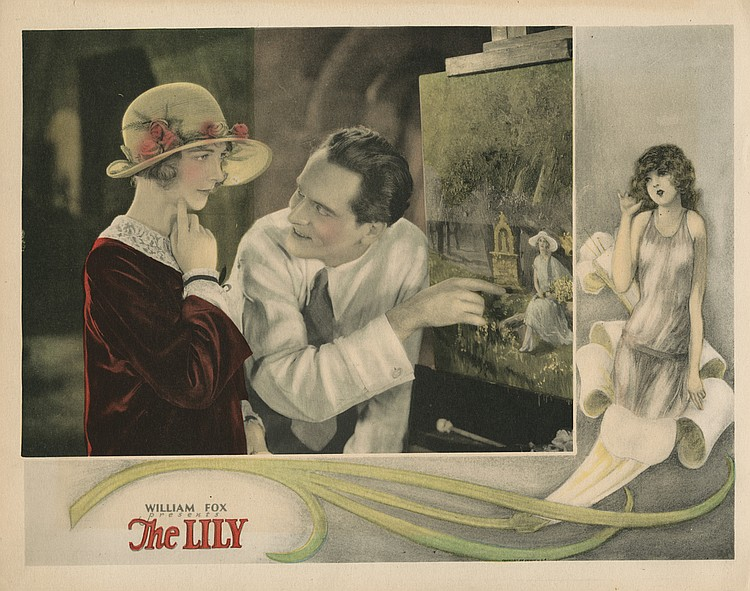
- Lobby card
- Directed by: Victor Schertzinger
- Screenplay by: Eve Unsell
- Based on: The Lily by David Belasco
- Starring: Belle Bennett; Ian Keith; Reata Hoyt; Barry Norton; John St. Polis; Richard Tucker
- Cinematography: Glen MacWilliams
- Production company: Fox Film Corporation
- Distributed by: Fox Film Corporation
- Release date: October 3, 1926
- Running time: 70 minutes
- Country: United States
- Language: Silent (English intertitles)

The Lily is a 1926 American silent drama film directed by Victor Schertzinger and written by Eve Unsell. It is based on the 1923 play The Lily by David Belasco. The film stars Belle Bennett, Ian Keith, Reata Hoyt, Barry Norton, John St. Polis, and Richard Tucker. The film was released on October 3, 1926, by Fox Film Corporation.

== Plot ==
As described in a film magazine review, the Comte de Maigny continues his complacent life in French society despite the hardship his arbitrary attitude imposes on his children. His eldest daughter Odette, reared in a strict school, is therefore compelled to remain unmarried so that his physical needs may be cared for, although her spiritual self slowly dies. The younger sister Christiane becomes involved in an affair with the artist George Arnaud. The father, hypocrite that he is, is shocked beyond measure. The daughter's indiscretion causes the son to lose any chance with the daughter of a wealthy sausage manufacturer. The unreasonable attitude of the count gradually causes Odette's latent rebellious nature to rise to the surface. She unmercifully scores her father and then leaves the house. Christine and her artist lover find there is yet a way out as George's first wife advices that she will grant him a divorce. Assured that her younger sister will not become a lily like herself, Odette is satisfied. It is then that Huzar, the family counselor, tells her of his love of many years standing, and she accepts him.

== Cast ==
- Belle Bennett as Odette
- Ian Keith as George Arnaud
- Reata Hoyt as Christiane
- Barry Norton as Max de Maigny
- John St. Polis as Comte de Maigny
- Richard Tucker as Huzar
- Gertrude Short as Lucie Plock
- James A. Marcus as Emile Plock
- Lydia Yeamans Titus as Housekeeper
- Tom Ricketts as Jean
- Vera Lewis as Mrs. Arnaud Sr.
- Betty Francisco as Mrs. Arnaud Jr.
- Carmelita Geraghty as Old Comte's Mistress

== Preservation ==
With no prints of The Lily located in any film archives, it is a lost film.
