= Ernest Butcher =

British actor (1885–1965)

- 1936 Spotlight photo
- Born: Edward Ernest Butcher; 7 April 1885; Burnley, Lancashire, England
- Died: 8 June 1965 (aged 80); London, England
- Occupation: Actor
- Spouse(s): Muriel George; Edna Brough

Edward Ernest Butcher (7 April 1885 – 8 June 1965) was a British actor, on stage from 1935, and with many film and TV appearances.

== Early life and career ==
Edward Ernest Butcher was born on 7 April 1885 in Cliviger, Burnley, Lancashire, England to teacher father, John Thomas, and shopkeeper mother, Margaret (nee Garlick). He was educated at Walk Mill School, where his father taught. Butcher worked as an electrical engineer and auctioneer before studying at the Royal Academy of Music. He served in the First World War with the Yorkshire and Lancashire Regiment.

Butcher formed his own company, The Bunch of Keys, with his wife, Muriel George. The couple sang duets and appeared at the Royal Variety Performance in 1922. He made his first broadcast in 1924 and his first film in 1934.

He appeared in the original production of J.B. Priestley's play When We Are Married at St. Martin's Theatre London, in 1938; and reprised his performance in the film version, in 1943. During the Second World War, he played in Front Line Family, a BBC overseas soap opera, broadcast daily.

Butcher was on the bill when Gracie Fields made her debut.

== Personal life and death ==
Butcher was the second husband of the actress Muriel George, and stepfather to her son, the critic John Davenport. Butcher and George married in 1921 in Fulham, west London. By 1939, the couple were living in Torrington Park, North Finchley. However, in 1943, the marriage ended in divorce.

In 1948, he married Edna Brough, sister of ventriloquist Peter Brough, in Wood Green, London.

Butcher latterly lived in Friary Road, Friern Barnet. On 22 May 1965 Butcher was admitted to Brompton Hospital in Kensington, London with heart and chest trouble. He died on 8 June 1965, aged 80, in hospital.

== Selected filmography ==
- Key to Harmony (1935)
- The Small Man (1936)
- Talking Feet (1937)
- The Song of the Road (1937)
- Stepping Toes (1938)
- Me and My Pal (1939)
- Black Eyes (1939)
- Pack Up Your Troubles (1940)
- Freedom Radio (1941)
- Old Mother Riley in Business (1941)
- 'Pimpernel' Smith (1941)
- When We Are Married (1943)
- Candles at Nine (1944)
- It's in the Bag (1944)
- Tawny Pipit (1944)
- It Happened One Sunday (1944)
- The Years Between (1946)
- Easy Money (1948)
- My Brother Jonathan (1948)
- My Brother's Keeper (1948)
- For Them That Trespass (1949)
- Diamond City (1949)
- Meet Simon Cherry (1949)
- Night and the City (1950)
- No Trace (1950)
- Blackout (1950)
- Highly Dangerous (1950)
- The Happy Family (1952)
- Time Bomb (1953)
- Background (1953)
- The Desperate Man (1959)
