= Talking Feet =

1937 film directed by John Baxter

- DVD cover
- Directed by: John Baxter
- Written by: Geoffrey Orme; Jack Francis; H. Fowler Mear
- Produced by: John Barter
- Starring: Hazel Ascot; Enid Stamp-Taylor; Jack Barty
- Cinematography: Jack Parker
- Edited by: Michael Truman
- Music by: Kennedy Russell
- Production company: UK Films
- Distributed by: Sound City Films
- Release date: 8 November 1937
- Running time: 71 minutes
- Country: United Kingdom
- Language: English

Talking Feet is a 1937 British musical film directed by John Baxter and starring Hazel Ascot, Enid Stamp-Taylor and Jack Barty. It was written by Geoffrey Orme, Jack Francis and H. Fowler Mear.

== Plot ==
Hazel, the daughter of an East London fishmonger, is on her way to the rehearsal of a pantomime when her dog Patch is injured in a street accident. At a local hospital Dr Hood manages to save Patch's life. When Hazel discovers that Dr Hood's hospital may have to close, she helps the local community to raise funds to save it. Mr Shirley, the manager of a local theatre, is persuaded to allow his venue to be used for a fund-raising event. Hazel brings together a group of talented locals to create an exciting evening of entertainment. The fund-raising effort is a success, and so Dr Hood's hospital is saved.

Most of the second half of the film consists of the variety show, featuring performers of the day.

== Cast ==
- Hazel Ascot as Hazel Barker
- Jack Barty as Joe Barker
- Davy Burnaby as Mr Shirley
- Enid Stamp Taylor as Sylvia Shirley
- John Stuart as Dr Roger Hood
- Ernest Butcher as Thomas
- Edgar Driver as Titch
- Muriel George as Mrs Gumley
- Kenneth Kove as Lord Cedric Scattery
- Robert English as Lord Langdale
- Scott Sanders as Scotty McDonald
- Jennie Gregson as Mrs Barker
- Johnnie Schofield as stage door keeper
- May Hallatt
- William Heughan
- John Turnbull
- Freddie Watts
- Mark Hambourg
- The Scotch Kilties
- The Dagenham Girl Pipers and Dancers
- The Military Pipers
- Corona Babes
- The Minipiano Ensemble of 14 Juveniles
- Garden Ray Girls
- The Band of H.M. Royal Marines (Plymouth Division)
- Billy Thorburn (uncredited)

== Production ==
The film was made at Shepperton Studios with sets were designed by John Bryan.

== Reception ==
The Monthly Film Bulletin wrote: "The story is sentimental but human and the atmosphere is genuine. Hazel Ascot, on whom the film largely depends, can dance neatly enough, but her singing and acting are stilted and self-conscious. Jack Barty gives life to the film as her father and there is a pleasant glimpse of Dave Burnaby as Mr. Shirley. The audition scenes might well have been omitted and the final show might have been shortened."

Kine Weekly wrote: "The sentiment is honest, the parade of turns most of which are new, is handled with real showmanship, while the small star, Hazel Ascot, is refused any attempt at precocity. To use an American colloquialism, the film has "got something," and that something, represented by the warmth and variety of the entertainment, is closely allied to the box-office. The show is British to the core."

Picture Show wrote: "Quite entertaining variety show."

Picturegoer wrote: "The main point about this picture is the screen debut of a new juvenile find, Hazel Ascot, who promises to do exceedingly well. ... Most of the appeal of the film relies on the "turns," which include some exceedingly good ones. The plot is very slight, but the artistes concerned make the most of it."

In British Sound Films: The Studio Years 1928–1959 David Quinlan rated the film as "mediocre", writing: "Moderate musical."

== Home media ==
Talking Feet was released on DVD by Renown Pictures on 11 Jun 2012.
