= Blind Man's Bluff (1936 film) =

1936 British film by Albert Parker

- James Mason, Barbara Greene and Basil Sydney in the film
- Directed by: Albert Parker
- Screenplay by: Cecil Maiden
- Based on: Smoked Glasses, a 1929 play by B. Scott-Elder and William Foster
- Starring: Basil Sydney; Enid Stamp-Taylor; James Mason; Barbara Greene
- Cinematography: Stanley Grant
- Edited by: Cecil H. Williamson
- Production company: Fox Film Company
- Distributed by: Fox Film Company
- Release date: March 1936
- Running time: 72 minutes
- Country: United Kingdom
- Language: English

Blind Man's Bluff is a 1936 British drama film directed by Albert Parker and starring Basil Sydney, Enid Stamp-Taylor and James Mason. It was written by Cecil Maiden based on the 1929 play Smoked Glasses by William Foster and B. Scott-Elder. The film was a quota quickie made at Wembley Studios by the Hollywood studio Fox's British subsidiary.

== Plot ==
Dr. Peter Fairfax is a blind scientist who successfully restores his own sight but keeps this a secret. He suspects his wife Sylvia of having an affair with the Philip Stanhope, who is in fact manipulating her to steal Fairfax's revolutionary formula for making armies invisible. When the truth about his recovered sight is revealed, Sylvia departs, leaving Fairfax to find love with his loyal young research assistant Vickie.

== Cast ==
- Basil Sydney as Dr. Peter Fairfax
- Enid Stamp-Taylor as Sylvia Fairfax
- James Mason as Stephen Neville
- Barbara Greene as Vickie Sheridan
- Iris Ashley as Claire
- Ian Colin as Philip Stanhope
- Wilson Coleman as Dr. Franz Morgenhardt
- Warburton Gamble as Tracy

== Reception ==
Kine Weekly wrote: "Albert Parker develops his tale with a flood of dialogue but succeeds in holding interest by giving clear-cut characterisation."

The Daily Film Renter wrote: "Credibility can hardly be said to be the narrative's strong point, but the action is staged in bright settings, and the work of Barbara Greene, as the heroine, has an appealing freshness that does much to atone for any defects. Basil Sidney's Fairfax is a straightforward study, but he suffers, in common with most of the other cast members, by having to develop his role on lines of dialogue rather than characterisation."

Picturegoer wrote: "Rather stagey, and over-dialogued production which nevertheless is quite fair in story values and has some unusual situations."

Picture Show wrote: "Much ado about very little."
