= Old English (film) =

1930 film

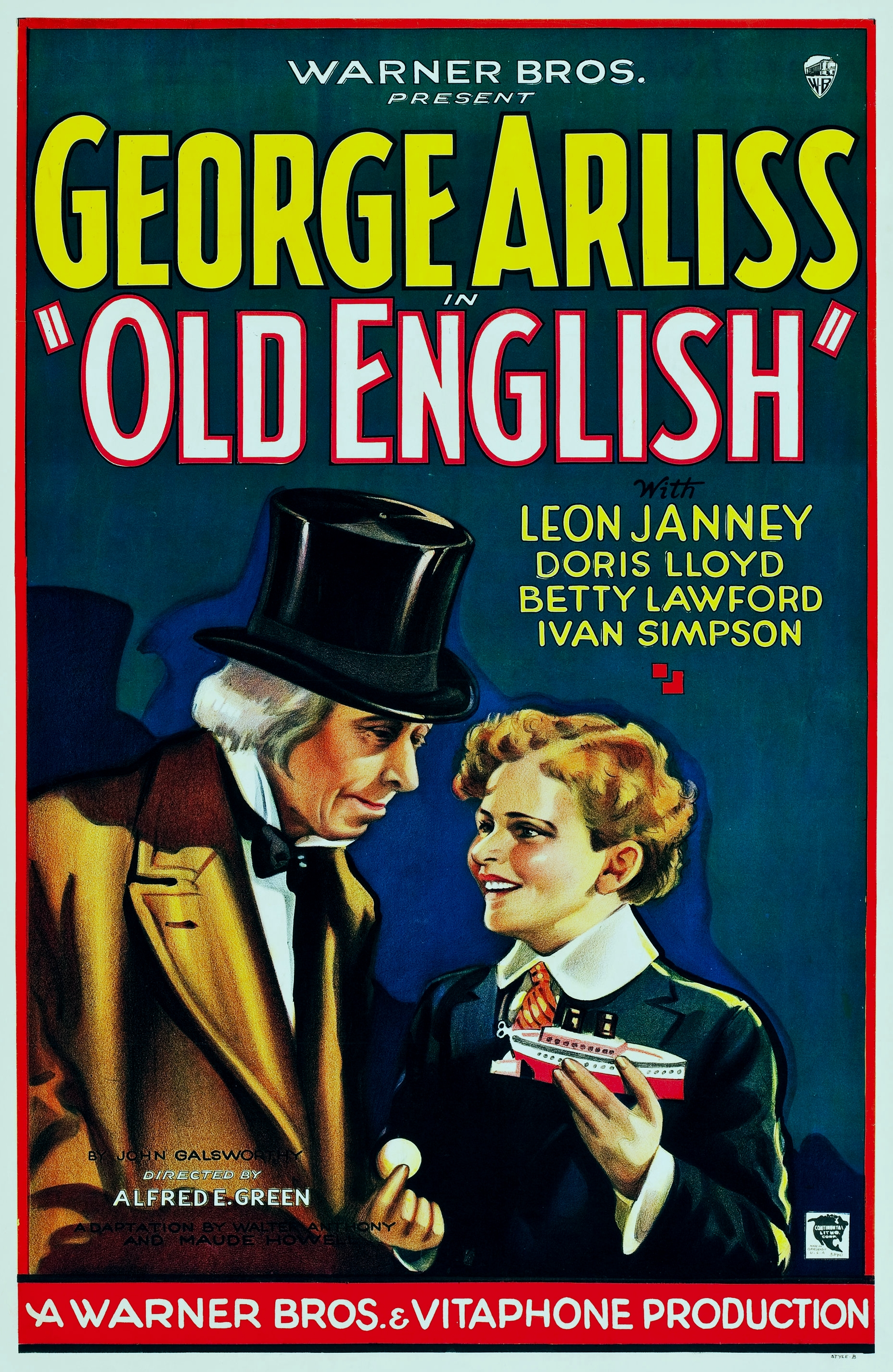
- Directed by: Alfred E. Green; Maude T. Howell (asst., uncredited)
- Written by: Walter Anthony; Maude T. Howell
- Based on: The play by John Galsworthy
- Starring: George Arliss; Leon Janney; Betty Lawford; Doris Lloyd
- Cinematography: James Van Trees
- Edited by: Owen Marks
- Music by: Erno Rapee; Louis Silvers
- Distributed by: Warner Bros. Pictures, Inc.
- Release date: September 27, 1930 (United States)
- Running time: 85 mins.
- Country: United States
- Language: English

Old English is a 1930 American pre-Code drama film directed by Alfred E. Green and produced by Warner Bros. Pictures. The film is based on the 1924 West End play of the same name by John Galsworthy. The film stars George Arliss, Leon Janney, Betty Lawford and Doris Lloyd. The film had its premiere August 21, 1930 at the Warner's Theatre in Hollywood.

== Plot ==
Heythorp is an old shipowner who finds himself on the verge of bankruptcy. He worries about his grandchildren, who are currently being taken care of by the miserly Mrs. Larne, the widowed wife of his son. She asks Heythorp for money, but suspecting that she will use the money on herself, he refuses. Although Heythorp is being hounded by creditors, he manages to get a loan by using some shady dealings for which he may be prosecuted. Heythorp wants to use the money for an investment, which will provide an independent allowance for his beloved grandchildren, Jock and Phyllis, which the greedy Mrs. Larne cannot touch. Although he manages to arrange everything so that he can die in peace, he is uncovered and threatened with exposure. In the end, Heythorp manages to escape punishment for his underhanded scheme.

== Cast ==
- George Arliss as Heythorp
- Leon Janney as Jock
- Betty Lawford as Phyllis
- Doris Lloyd as Mrs. Larne
- Harrington Reynolds as Gilbert Farney
- Reginald Sheffield as Bob Pillin
- Murray Kinnell as Charles Ventnor
- Ivan F. Simpson as Joe Pillin
- Ethel Griffies as Adela Heythorp
- John Rogers as Budgeon - a Shareholder
- Henrietta Goodwin as Letty, the Larne's Maid

== Preservation ==
The film survives complete and has been released by the Warner Archive on DVD. A print is preserved in the Library of Congress collection.
