= The Last Gentleman (film) =

1934 film by Sidney Lanfield

- Theatrical release poster
- Directed by: Sidney Lanfield; Maude T. Howell (asst.)
- Screenplay by: Maude T. Howell; Leonard Praskins; Paul Schofield
- Based on: The Last Gentleman by Katherine Clugston
- Produced by: Joseph M. Schenck; Darryl F. Zanuck
- Starring: George Arliss; Edna May Oliver; Janet Beecher; Charlotte Henry; Ralph Morgan
- Cinematography: Barney McGill
- Edited by: Maurice Wright
- Music by: Alfred Newman
- Production company: Twentieth Century Pictures
- Distributed by: United Artists
- Release date: April 28, 1934
- Running time: 72 minutes
- Country: United States
- Language: English

The Last Gentleman is a 1934 American pre-Code comedy film directed by Sidney Lanfield and written by Maude T. Howell, Leonard Praskins and Paul Schofield. The film stars George Arliss, Edna May Oliver, Janet Beecher, Charlotte Henry and Ralph Morgan. The film was released on April 28, 1934, by United Artists.

== Cast ==
- George Arliss as Cabot Barr
- Edna May Oliver as Augusta Pritchard
- Janet Beecher as Helen Barr
- Charlotte Henry as Marjorie Barr
- Ralph Morgan as Henry Loring
- Edward Ellis as Claude
- Frank Albertson as Allan Blaine
- Rafaela Ottiano as Retta Barr
- Donald Meek as Judd Barr
- Joseph Cawthorn as Dr. Wilson
- Harry C. Bradley as Prof. Schumaker (uncredited)
