= While Parents Sleep (film) =

- Feature on the film from Picture Show (22 February 1936)
- Directed by: Adrian Brunel
- Written by: John Paddy Carstairs; Jack Marks; Anthony Kimmins (play); Edwin Greenwood
- Produced by: Paul Soskin
- Starring: Jean Gillie; Enid Stamp Taylor; Romilly Lunge
- Cinematography: Ernest Palmer
- Edited by: Michael Hankinson
- Music by: Percival Mackey
- Production companies: British & Dominions Film Corporation
- Distributed by: United Artists Corporation
- Release date: September 1935
- Running time: 72 minutes
- Country: United Kingdom
- Language: English

While Parents Sleep is a 1935 British comedy film directed by Adrian Brunel and starring Jean Gillie, Enid Stamp Taylor and Romilly Lunge. It was written by John Paddy Carstairs, Jack Marks and Edwin Greenwood, based on the 1932 play of the same name by Anthony Kimmins, which had been a popular success on the West End stage in the West End of London. It was produced by Transatlantic Film Corporation and British & Dominions Film Corporation.

== Plot ==
Neville, the elder son of Colonel and Mrs. Hammond, is a Guards officer infatuated with Lady Cattering, the wife of his commanding officer. His younger brother Jerry is an irresponsible naval officer who recently met Bubbles, a shop-girl. They all gather for a dinner party at the Hammond family estate, where Lady Cattering takes pleasure in mocking the working-class Bubbles. The following night, Neville brings Lady Cattering to stay with his parents, but they are caught in a compromising situation by Jerry and Bubbles. Though Bubbles is given a perfect opportunity to get revenge on her tormentor, she declines. Moved by her grace, Neville finally sees through Lady Cattering's facade and realizes his own folly. Meanwhile, Bubbles’ heart of gold wins over her snobbish future mother-in-law.

== Cast ==
- Jean Gillie as Bubbles Thompson
- Enid Stamp Taylor as Lady Cattering
- Romilly Lunge as Neville Hammond
- Mackenzie Ward as Jerry Hammond
- Athole Stewart as Colonel Hammond
- Ellis Jeffreys as Mrs. Hammond
- Davy Burnaby as Lord Cattering
- William Hartnell as George
- Wally Patch as taxi driver
- Ronald Shiner as the mechanic

== Reception ==
The Monthly Film Bulletin wrote: "The development is episodic; many of the situations are amusing but irrelevant. The opening is slow, much time being taken up in showing the social standing of the Hammonds, the wildness of Jerry, and the commonness of Bubbles. The acting on the whole is competent and the team work effective."

The Daily Film Renter wrote: "Apart from the introduction of a few fairground and restaurant sequences, this picture is developed on the lines of a stage play throughout its length. The plot, basically slender, is rendered even more flimsy by its evident lack of cohesion. Interest is allowed to wander between two plot issues which, had they been deftly welded together, should have strengthened the story structure considerably. Uninspired direction is an additional disadvantage."

Picturegoer wrote: "If only the screen were as free as the stage to point a risque situation with spicy dialogue this film might have been a great deal more amusing. As it is, the producer has had to keep one eye on the Censor, leaving only one for the box-office; and the box-office must lose in consequence."

The Time Out Film Guide wrote: "With a couple of tatty sets and a bunch of unknown actors, [Brunel] produces a witty, sharply-paced, economical essay on class and manners in inter-war Britain."
