= Muriel George =

English singer and film actress (1883–1965)

- Born: 29 August 1883; London, England
- Died: 22 October 1965 (aged 82); Brighton, Sussex, England
- Occupation: Actress
- Years active: 1932–1955
- Spouses: Robert Davenport (m. 1903; div. 1909) Ernest Butcher (m. 1921; div. 1943)
- Children: John Davenport

Muriel George (29 August 1883 – 22 October 1965) was an English singer and film actress. She appeared in 55 films between 1932 and 1955. George also appeared on the variety stage and sang on radio with her second husband, Ernest Butcher, for thirty years.

== Early life and career ==
Muriel Winifred George was born on the 29 August 1883 in Marylebone, London, England. Her father, Robert, was a professor of singing at the Royal Academy of Music and her mother, Annie Isabel Matilde (née Robinson), was an ex pupil of her husband and a singing teacher in her own right. The family moved to Albany Street, Regent's Park, on the birth of George's brother, Lionel Hugh. At the age of 10, the family moved to West Kensington. George attended a private school in Holland Road. At the age of twelve, she appeared on stage at the Devonshire Park, Eastbourne.

She made her West End stage debut, at the age of 16, in Harry Pelissier's pierrot troupe, The Follies at The Palace, Shaftesbury Avenue, London before joining Arthur Davenport's pierrot troupe, The Yashmaks, a year later. George then toured with The Ragamuffins for a year.

George subsequently performed at the Apollo Theatre in 1911.

In 1912, George appeared in the first English version of Die Fledermaus at the Lyric Theatre.

George appeared on the variety stage with her second husband Ernest Butcher. At the turn of the First World War, George, along with Butcher, formed The Bunch of Keys concert party. After the war, they made radio appearances and played comedy parts in straight plays.

George's last role was playing the queen mother in a 1953 adaptation of the Rose and the Ring.

== Personal life ==
George married Robert William (known as 'Robin' or 'Arthur') Davenport, an author and lyricist in 1903. The couple lived in Fulham, west London and, on 10 May 1908, had a son, the critic John Davenport. However, George petitioned Davenport for divorce in July 1909 and Davenport did not meet his son until John was 16 years old.

George married actor Ernest Butcher in 1921 in Fulham, west London. By 1939, the couple were living in Torrington Park, North Finchley. However, in 1943, the marriage ended in divorce.

George's hobbies included gardening and antiques, and she latterly lived in Worthing, West Sussex. George wrote an unpublished autobiography between 1941 and 1957.

George died on 22 October 1965, aged 82, at the Sussex Eye Hospital in Brighton, Sussex.

== Selected filmography ==
- His Lordship (1932) – Mrs. Emma Gibbs
- Yes, Mr Brown (1933) – Cook
- Cleaning Up (1933) – Mrs. Hoggenheim
- Something Always Happens (1934) – Mrs. Badger
- My Song for You (1934) – Mrs. Newberg
- Nell Gwyn (1934) – Meg
- Key to Harmony (1935) – Mrs. Meynell
- Old Faithful (1935) – Martha Brown
- Whom the Gods Love (1936) – Frau Weber
- Not So Dusty (1936) – Mrs. Clark
- The Happy Family (1936) – Housekeeper
- The Song of the Road (1937) – Mrs. Trelawney
- Busman's Holiday (1936) – Mrs. Green
- Merry Comes to Town (1937) – Cook
- Limelight (1937) – Mrs. Kaye
- Who's Your Lady Friend? (1937) – Mrs. Somers
- Talking Feet (1937) – Mrs. Gumley
- Doctor Syn (1937) – Mrs. Waggetts, Pub Owner
- Lancashire Luck (1937) – Mrs. Lovejoy
- A Sister to Assist 'Er (1938) – Mrs. May / Mrs. le Browning
- Darts Are Trumps (1938) – Mrs. Drake
- Weddings Are Wonderful (1938) – Betty's maid
- Crackerjack (1938) – Mrs. Humbold
- 21 Days (1940) – Ma (uncredited)
- Pack Up Your Troubles (1940) – Mrs. Perkins
- The Briggs Family (1940) – Mrs. Brokenshaw
- Freedom Radio (1941) – Hanna
- You Will Remember (1941) – Manchester Landlady (uncredited)
- Love on the Dole (1941) – Landlady (uncredited)
- Quiet Wedding (1941) – The Cook (uncredited)
- Cottage to Let (1941) – Mrs. Trimm
- South American George (1941) – Auntie (uncredited)
- Rush Hour (1941, Short) – Violet (uncredited)
- Mr. Proudfoot Shows a Light (1941, Short) – Mrs. Proudfoot
- They Flew Alone (1942) – Kitty, the Housekeeper
- Unpublished Story (1942) – Landlady
- Alibi (1942) – Mme. Bretonnet
- The Young Mr. Pitt (1942) – Mrs. Carr (uncredited)
- Went the Day Well? (1942) – Mrs. Collins
- The Bells Go Down (1943) – Ma Robbins
- Dear Octopus (1943) – Cook
- Schweik's New Adventures (1943) – Mrs. Millerova
- Kiss the Bride Goodbye (1945) – Mrs. Fowler
- A Place of One's Own (1945) – Nurse
- For You Alone (1945) – Mrs. Johns
- I'll Be Your Sweetheart (1945) – Mrs. Le Brunn
- Perfect Strangers (1945) – Minnie
- Jassy (1947) – Court Matron (uncredited)
- When the Bough Breaks (1947) – 1st Landlady
- A Sister to Assist 'Er (1948) – Gladys May
- Bond Street (1948) – Maid (uncredited)
- Last Holiday (1950) – Lady Oswington
- The Dancing Years (1950) – Hatti
- Encore (1951) – Mrs. Robinson (uncredited)
- The Triangle (1953) – Martha Popple (segment "Priceless Pocket")
- Simon and Laura (1955) – Grandma (final film role)
