= The Flaw (1933 film) =

1933 film

- Contemporary trade advertisement
- Directed by: Norman Walker
- Written by: Brandon Fleming
- Produced by: Patrick K. Heale
- Starring: Henry Kendall; Eric Maturin; Phyllis Clare
- Cinematography: Eric Cross
- Production company: Patrick K. Heale Productions
- Distributed by: Paramount British Pictures
- Release date: October 1933
- Running time: 67 minutes
- Country: United Kingdom
- Language: English

The Flaw is a 1933 British thriller film directed by Norman Walker and starring Henry Kendall, Eric Maturin and Phyllis Clare. It was written by Brandon Fleming, and was made as a quota quickie at Wembley Studios. It was remade in 1955 with the same title.

== Cast ==
- Henry Kendall as John Millway
- Eric Maturin as James Kelver
- Phyllis Clare as Laura Kelver
- Eve Gray as Irene Nelson
- Douglas Payne as Inspector Barnes
- Sydney Seaward as Sergeant
- Vera Gerald as Mrs. Mamby
- Elsie Irving
- E.A. Williams

== Reception ==
Picturegoer wrote: "It is quite ingenious, if not wholly convincing, and the technical qualities are sound."

Picture Show wrote: "Thrilling murder melodrama ... Here and there the development is a little unconvincing, and the trouble the victim goes to to polish off his murderer by his own method seems quite unnecessary. Nevertheless, it is entertaining and well acted."

TV Guide called it a "Nicely constructed thriller," and gave it two out of five stars.
