= While Parents Sleep (play) =

1932 play

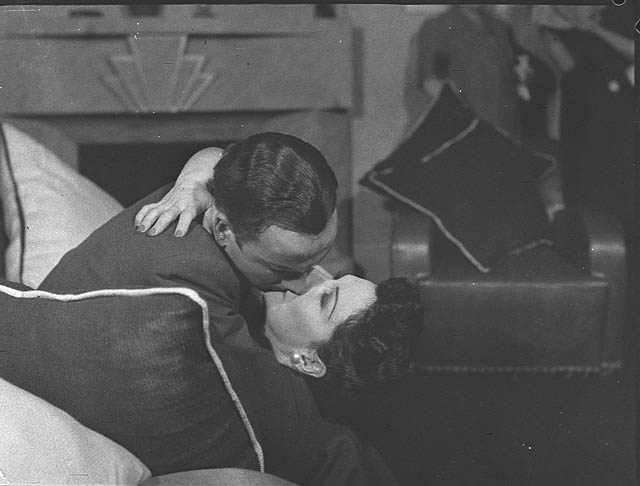
While Parents Sleep, still from the 1943 stage production.

While Parents Sleep is a comedy play by the British writer Anthony Kimmins, which was first staged in 1932. It ran for 492 performances during its initial West End run, first at the Royalty Theatre and then transferring to the Garrick. The original cast included Nigel Playfair, Hugh Williams, Jack Hawkins and Diana Beaumont. It was revived again in 1933 for a further 315 performances. Its 1934 Broadway run was much shorter, lasting for only 16 performances at the Playhouse Theatre.

== Synopsis ==
Two brothers invited their girlfriends over to their house, causing immense disruption to the lives of their parents.

== Film Adaptation ==
In 1935 the play served as the basis of the film While Parents Sleep directed by Adrian Brunel and starring Jean Gillie and Enid Stamp Taylor.

== Bibliography ==
- Wearing, J.P. The London Stage 1930-1939: A Calendar of Productions, Performers, and Personnel. Rowman & Littlefield, 2014.
