= The Door with Seven Locks (1940 film) =

1940 British film by Norman Lee

- Film poster with the US title
- Directed by: Norman Lee
- Screenplay by: John Argyle; Gilbert Gunn; Norman Lee
- Based on: The Door with Seven Locks; 1926 novel by Edgar Wallace
- Produced by: John Argyle
- Starring: Leslie Banks; Lilli Palmer; Romilly Lunge; Gina Malo
- Cinematography: Alex Bryce; Ernest Palmer
- Edited by: E.G. Richards
- Music by: Guy Jones
- Production company: John Argyle Productions
- Distributed by: Pathé Pictures (UK)
- Release dates: 12 October 1940 (UK); 20 December 1940 (US)
- Running time: 89 minutes (UK); 79 minutes (US)
- Country: United Kingdom
- Language: English

The Door with Seven Locks is a 1940 British horror film directed by Norman Lee and starring Leslie Banks and Lili Palmer. The screenplay was by John Argyle, Gilbert Gunn and Norman Lee based on the 1926 novel The Door with Seven Locks by Edgar Wallace.

Released in the United States by Monogram Pictures under the title Chamber of Horrors, it was the second Wallace film adaptation to arrive in the United States, the first being The Dark Eyes of London (called The Human Monster in the US), starring Béla Lugosi, which had been released the year before.

It was released shortly after the British Board of Film Censors lifted its mid-1930s ban on supernatural-themed and horror genre films.

== Plot ==
A wealthy lord dies and is entombed with a valuable deposit of jewels. Seven keys are required to unlock the tomb and get hold of the treasure. A series of mysterious events causes the keys to be scattered, and when trying to unravel the circumstances, the heiress of the fortune and her companion investigators become entangled in a web of fraud, deceit, torture, and murder.

It becomes obvious that family physician, Dr. Manetta, is the untrustworthy person. Assisted by the mute family butler and the family chauffeur (a forger on the run), Manetta seeks to steal the treasure for himself. When rightful heiress June Lansdowne arrives, she is seized and locked in the tomb before she can announce her presence. She is eventually freed by a pet monkey that steals the key to the tomb.

Suspicion grows when Dr. Manetta announces he is an admirer of Torquemada (the chief torturer during the Spanish Inquisition); and that he keeps a museum of torture instruments in the basement.

When the authorities close in, Manetta is trapped in an automatic spiked mummy case. The police reluctantly rescue him. Manetta makes a full confession, then commits suicide by poison. He is proud that he killed himself with a goblet once owned by Lucretia Borgia.

The treasure is discovered inside the tomb, the one place Manetta didn't search because he didn't want to call attention to Lansdowne's captivity there.

== Cast ==
- Leslie Banks as Dr. Manetta
- Lilli Palmer as June Lansdowne
- Romilly Lunge as Dick Martin
- Gina Malo as Glenda Baker
- David Horne as Edward Havelock
- Richard Bird as Inspector Sneed
- Cathleen Nesbitt as Ann Cody
- JH Roberts as Luis Silva
- Aubrey Mallalieu as Lord Charles Francis Selford
- Harry Hutchinson as Bevan Cody
- Ross Landon as John Selford
- Phil Ray as Tom Cawler
- Robert Montgomery as Craig the butler

== Reception ==
The Monthly Film Bulletin wrote: "Good direction and better acting conceal the flaws in this improbable story, and the result is a picture with suspense, thrills and a welcome leavening of humour. Leslie Banks is a gruesome villain, Lilli Palmer is a refreshingly 'different' heroine and Romilly Lunge sufficiently impetuous as the young detective."

Kine Weekly wrote: "The Door with Seven Locks certainly has an ominous and forbidding setting, and, what's more, it lives up to its evil atmosphere. The acting, like the stagecraft, is in stern harmony with the theme. The two together are Edgar Wallace at his spine-chilling best. Title, author and star values clinch the obvious box-office proposition."

Picturegoer wrote: "It takes a little time to gather up the threads of the plot, but there is plenty of good action in the best Wallace tradition, while the sinister atmosphere is skilfully built up and maintained. Leslie Banks revels in the role of Stilleti and David Horne contributes a subtle essay in villainy as Havelock. Lilli Palmer is good as the heiress, while Romilly Lunge plays the detective attractively. If you like spine-chillers this should suit you."

Leslie Halliwell said: "Old-fashioned barnstormer, ineptly made."

In British Sound Films: The Studio Years 1928–1959 David Quinlan rated the film as "good", writing: "Robust blood and thunder, eerie and well-acted."

== See also ==
- The Door with Seven Locks (1962)
