= Beatrice Varley =

English actress (1896–1964)

- Millions Like Us, 1943
- Born: Beatrice Evelyn Varley; 11 July 1896; Manchester, Lancashire, England
- Died: 4 July 1964 (aged 67); Ealing, London, England
- Years active: 1936–1964

Beatrice Evelyn Varley (11 July 1896 – 4 July 1964) was an English actress who appeared in television and film roles between 1936 and 1964. She made her screen debut in the 1936 film Tomorrow We Live and began to portray a variety of character roles in films such as Oh, Mr Porter!, Holiday Camp and The Wicked Lady before moving predominantly into television until she died in 1964.

== Selected filmography ==
- Tomorrow We Live (1936) – Patricia's Mother (uncredited)
- Spring Handicap (1937) – Mrs. Tulip
- Oh, Mr Porter! (1937) – Barney's Bar Landlady (uncredited)
- Young and Innocent (1937) – Accused Man's Wife in First Court Case (uncredited)
- Crackerjack (1938) – Bit Role (uncredited)
- Poison Pen (1939) – Mrs. Jenkins
- Inspector Hornleigh on Holiday (1939) – Mrs. Mooney (uncredited)
- Kipps (1941) – Mrs. Kipps
- Rush Hour (1941, Short) – Shopper (uncredited)
- South American George (1941) – Mrs. Butters
- Hatter's Castle (1942) – Mrs. Brodie
- Secret Mission (1942) – Mrs. Donkin – the British Cook
- Talk About Jacqueline (1942) – (uncredited)
- Squadron Leader X (1943) – Mrs. Krohn
- We Dive at Dawn (1943) – Mrs. Dabbs (uncredited)
- The Bells Go Down (1943) – Ma Turk
- The Man in Grey (1943) – Gipsy
- I'll Walk Beside You (1943) – Miss McKenzie
- Millions Like Us (1943) – Miss Wells
- Bees in Paradise (1944) – Moagga
- Welcome, Mr. Washington (1944) – Martha
- Love Story (1944) – Miss Rossiter
- Waterloo Road (1945) – Mrs. Colter
- Great Day (1945) – Miss Tracy
- The Agitator (1945) – Mrs. Shackleton
- Johnny Frenchman (1945) – Mrs. Tremayne
- The Seventh Veil (1945) – (uncredited)
- The Wicked Lady (1945) – Aunt Moll
- Bedelia (1946) – Mary
- Send for Paul Temple (1946) – Miss Marchment
- The Upturned Glass (1947) – Injured Girl's Mother
- They Made Me a Fugitive (1947) – Farmer's Wife (uncredited)
- So Well Remembered (1947) – Annie
- Holiday Camp (1947) – Valerie's Aunt
- Jassy (1947) – Mrs. Wicks
- Master of Bankdam (1947) – Mrs. Pickersgill
- The Little Ballerina (1947) – Mrs. Field
- My Brother Jonathan (1948) – Mrs. Hodgkiss
- Good-Time Girl (1948) – Mrs. Rawlings
- My Brother's Keeper (1948) – Mrs. Martin
- No Room at the Inn (1948) – Mrs. Jarvis (uncredited)
- Marry Me! (1949) – Mrs. Perrins
- Adam and Evalyn (1949) – Mrs. Parker
- The Twenty Questions Murder Mystery (1950) – Olive Tavy (uncredited)
- Paul Temple's Triumph (1950) – Mrs. Weston
- Gone to Earth (1950) – Aunt Prowde
- No Trace (1950) – Landlady
- She Shall Have Murder (1950) – Mrs. Hawthorne
- Out of True (1951, Short) – Mrs. Green
- Hindle Wakes (1952) – Mrs. Hollins
- The Wild Heart (1952) – Aunt Prowde
- Death Goes to School (1953) – Miss Hopkinson
- Melba (1953) – Aunt Catherine
- Bang! You're Dead (1954) – Mrs. Moxted
- The Black Rider (1954) – Mrs. Marsh
- Jumping for Joy (1956) – Landlady (uncredited)
- The Feminine Touch (1956) – Sister Snow
- Tiger in the Smoke (1956) – Lucy Cash
- The Good Companions (1957) – Mrs. Jimmy Nunn
- Sea Wife (1957) – Elderly Nun
- Hell Drivers (1957) – Mrs. Yately – Tom's Mother
- The Surgeon's Knife (1957) – Mrs. Waring
- Bachelor of Hearts (1958) – Mrs. Upcott
- Room at the Top (1959) – Aunt
- Horrors of the Black Museum (1959) – Aggie
- The Rough and the Smooth (1959) – Hotel Manageress
- Identity Unknown (1960) – Matron
- Night Without Pity (1961) – Mother
- Echo of Barbara (1961) – Mrs. Roscoe
