= South American George =

1941 film by Marcel Varnel

- Opening titles
- Directed by: Marcel Varnel
- Written by: Leslie Arliss; Norman Lee; Austin Melford (Additional dialogue)
- Produced by: Ben Henry; Marcel Varnel
- Starring: George Formby; Linden Travers; Enid Stamp-Taylor; Felix Aylmer
- Cinematography: Arthur Crabtree
- Edited by: Edward B. Jarvis
- Music by: Harry Bidgood
- Production company: Columbia British Productions
- Distributed by: Columbia Pictures Corporation
- Release date: 27 December 1941 (UK)
- Running time: 92 minutes
- Country: United Kingdom
- Language: English
- Box office: £135,168 (UK)

South American George is a 1941 British black-and-white comedy film directed by Marcel Varnel and starring George Formby in a dual role, Linden Travers, Enid Stamp-Taylor, Felix Aylmer, Ronald Shiner, Mavis Villiers and Herbert Lomas. It was written by Leslie Arliss, Norman Lee and Austin Melford, and was produced by Columbia (British) Productions. The film was re-released in 1947.

== Synopsis ==
A press agent hurries to bring in a substitute after a South American opera star flops. A lookalike takes over from the tenor, but chaos ensues when the bogus singer finds himself hunted by paid assassins.

== Cast ==
- George Formby as George Butters / Gilli Vanetti
- Linden Travers as Carole Dean
- Enid Stamp-Taylor as Frances Martinique
- Jacques Brown as Enrico Richardo
- Felix Aylmer as Mr Appleby
- Ronald Shiner as Swifty
- Alf Goddard as Slappy
- Gus McNaughton as George White
- Mavis Villiers as Mrs Durrant
- Herbert Lomas as Mr Butters
- Cameron Hall as Muriel George
- Eric Clavering as Mr Durrant
- Beatrice Varley as Mrs Butters

== Reception ==
The Monthly Film Bulletin wrote: "The film opens on a quiet note but under competent direction it quickly develops into an amusing, and at times extremely funny, comedy. George Formby in a dual releis at the top of his form, and the versatile way in which he switches from the simple Lancashire lad, George, to the temperamental opera star, Vannetti, will delight his admirers."

The Daily Film Renter wrote: "George Formby in another typical spot of bother. Characteristic songs, broad humour and feminine entanglements. ... Weak situations and lack of strong support glossed over by star's disarming high-spirits and general verve of proceedings. Passable direction. Dependable booking for the star's vast following, registering on stellar billing and care-free away-from-the-war non-sensicalities."

According to TV Guide, "Formby's comic talents give the unlikely story a few fun moments, though the film is for the most part a hit-and-miss effort".
