= Edwin Greenwood =

British film director, screenwriter (1895–1939)

Edwin Greenwood (1895–1939) was a British screenwriter, novelist and film director.

== Selected filmography ==
Director

- The Fair Maid of Perth (1923)
- Heartstrings (1923)
- The Bells (1923) 20-minute silent film made as part of the "Gems of Literature" film series
- A Woman in Pawn (1927)
- Tesha (1928)
- To What Red Hell (1929)
- The Co-Optimists (1929)

Screenwriter

- The Physician (1928)
- The Love Race (1931)
- The Girl in the Night (1931)
- The Maid of the Mountains (1932)
- Lord Camber's Ladies (1932, produced by Alfred Hitchcock)
- Money Talks (1933)
- East Meets West (1936)
- His Lordship (1936)
- Young and Innocent (1937)

Actor

- Chappy - That's All (1924) – Slim Jim
- Jamaica Inn (1939) – Dandy – Sir Humphrey's Gang (final film role)

== Bibliography ==
Novels

- Skin and Bone (1934) – Published in the US as The Deadly Dowager
- Miracle in the Drawing Room: A Daring and Cynical Novel of the Modern World’s Reaction to an Old-fashioned Miracle (1935)
- Pins and Needles: A Melodrama (1935) – Published in the US as The Fair Devil
- French Farce: A Tale of Gallic Lunacy, Murder and Death (1937)
- Old Goat: A Fantasia on the Theme of Blackmail and Sudden Death (1937)
- Dark Understudy: A Modern Crime Story (1940)
