= Barry Norton =

Argentine-American actor

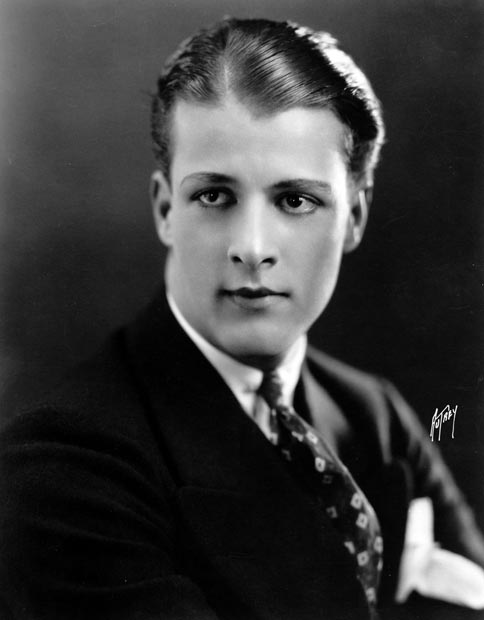
- Norton in 1927
- Born: Alfredo Carlos Birabén; June 16, 1905; Buenos Aires, Argentina
- Died: August 24, 1956 (aged 51); Hollywood, California, United States
- Years active: 1925–1956

Barry Norton (born Alfredo Carlos Birabén; June 16, 1905 – August 24, 1956) was an Argentine-American actor. He appeared in over 90 films, starting in silent films from 1925 until his death in 1956. He is perhaps best known for his role as Juan Harker in Universal Pictures' Spanish-language version of Drácula in 1931, the English language role of Jonathan Harker originated by David Manners.

== Early life ==
In 1923, Norton emigrated to the United States as a second cabin class passenger under the name of Carlos Manuel A. Biraben on the S/S Vestris, which had sailed from Buenos Aires, 12 March, and arrived at the Port of New York on 1 April 1923. Years later, he became a naturalized United States citizen.

== Career ==
Arriving in Hollywood in the 1920s, Norton first appeared as an extra in The Black Pirate (1926) but was soon cast in Fox Films' The Lily that same year. His big break came when he was given the role of Pvt. "Mother's Boy" Lewisohn in What Price Glory?, which turned out to be a huge commercial success. He landed substantial roles in The Legion of the Condemned and 4 Devils (both 1928), which were also very successful. His acting was well received by audiences and critics at the time, and, during the silent era, he avoided being typecast as a Latin lover. H.B. Wilson, proprietor of the Palace Theatre in Golden City, Missouri, said, "[Norton] has as yet to show me a bad performance. There's a boy that is a 'natural'."

In the early 1930s, Norton could still get leading roles in major films. Major Hollywood studios started producing alternate-language versions of their prestige productions, and he became one of dozens of Latino actors needed. Drácula was one of these films, but Norton also appeared in Spanish-language versions of Paramount on Parade (1930), The Benson Murder Case (1930), and The Criminal Code (1931). In a few cases, he appeared in both versions of a film. Examples include Storm Over the Andes (Spanish version: Alas sobre El Chaco), The Sea Fiend (El diablo del Mar), and Captain Calamity (El capitan Tormenta), the latter film reuniting him with Lupita Tovar, his romantic interest from Dracula.

In addition to roles in Spanish-territory films, he had roles in numerous major films, usually playing sophisticated Europeans. With the decline in Spanish-language film production in Los Angeles, Norton's opportunities for leading roles became less and less frequent. Though he had a pleasing voice, his Argentine accent seemed incongruous with his appearance. According to some sources, he never mastered English very well. In 1933, he secured what would be his last important role, playing Jean Parker's Spanish fiancé in Frank Capra's Lady for a Day (1933). Although he would continue to work for another 15 years, Norton's last credited screen role would be Should Husbands Work? (1939). For the rest of his career, Norton continued to reside in Los Angeles and obtain small roles in films.

== Personal life ==
Norton was married to Josephine Byers, a woman from California by whom he had a daughter, Sharon, and two grandchildren. In her autobiography Being and Becoming, actress Myrna Loy wrote that she briefly dated Norton. Other sources link him romantically with Dorothy Dare and Alice Terry. In the latter's case, they appear to have been friends rather than lovers.

== Death ==
On August 24, 1956, Norton died of a heart attack in Hollywood, California. He was 51 years old. He died penniless and his old Hollywood friends – among them Antonio Moreno, Gilbert Roland, Gertrude Astor, Philo McCullough and Charles Morton – took up a collection to pay for his cremation, which required the permission of his brother in Buenos Aires.

== Selected filmography ==
- The Black Pirate (1926)
- The Lily (1926)
- What Price Glory? (1926)
- The Canyon of Light (1926)
- Sunrise: A Song of Two Humans (1927)
- The Wizard (1927)
- The Legion of the Condemned (1928)
- Fleetwing (1928)
- The Red Dance (1928)
- Mother Knows Best (1928)
- 4 Devils (1928)
- Sins of the Fathers (1928)
- The Exalted Flapper (1929)
- El cuerpo del delito (1930)
- Amor audaz (1930)
- Galas de la Paramount (1930)
- Oriente y occidente (1930)
- El código penal (1931)
- Dishonored (1931)
- Drácula (1931)
- El pasado acusa (1931)
- Luxury Liner (1933)
- Cocktail Hour (1933)
- Lady for a Day (1933)
- Unknown Blonde (1934)
- Let's Be Ritzy (1934)
- The World Moves On (1934)
- Grand Canary (1934)
- Imitation of Life (1934)
- Anna Karenina (1935)
- Storm Over the Andes (1935)
- Alas sobre El Chaco (1935)
- Captain Calamity (1936)
- El capitan Tormenta (1936)
- Camille (1936)
- The Sea Fiend (1936)
- El diablo del Mar (1936)
- Marihuana (El monstruo verde) (1936)
- History Is Made at Night (1937)
- Hollywood Hotel (1937)
- The Buccaneer (1938)
- El trovador de la radio (1938)
- Second Fiddle (1939)
- Should Husbands Work? (1939)
- Dance, Girl, Dance (1940)
- One Night in the Tropics (1940)
- My Life with Caroline (1941)
- Casablanca (1942) - Gambler at Rick's (uncredited)
- Above Suspicion (1943)
- Zombies on Broadway (1945)
- The Razor's Edge (1946)
- Three Little Girls in Blue (1946)
- Monsieur Verdoux (1947)
- Angel on the Amazon (1948)
- Strangers on a Train (1951) (uncredited)
- What Price Glory? (1952)
- Yankee Pasha (1954)
- The Caine Mutiny (1954)
- A Star Is Born (1954)
- So This Is Paris (1955)
- Ain't Misbehavin' (1955)
- To Catch a Thief (1955)
- It's Always Fair Weather (1955)
- The Girl in the Red Velvet Swing (1955)
- Meet Me in Las Vegas (1956)
- The She-Creature (1956)
- Around the World in 80 Days (1956)
- Runaway Daughters (1956)
- Mister Cory (1957)
