= Eric Maturin =

British actor (1883–1957)

Eric Maturin in 1930

Eric Bagot Maturin (30 May 1883 – 17 October 1957) was a British actor whose acting career began in 1905 and whose first film appearance was in 1919 during the era of silent films.

== Early life ==
Maturin was born in Nainital, India in 1883, the oldest of three sons born to Edith Emily (née Money; 1863–1945) and Colonel Frederick Henry Maturin (1848–1936) of the East Surrey Regiment, who married on 1 August 1882 at St Andrew's church in Darjeeling; the couple divorced in 1911. In 1901, Eric Maturin was recorded as an insurance office clerk. During World War I, he served in the Royal Field Artillery from 1914 to 1918, reaching the rank of Lieutenant.

Maturin served in Mesopotamia for eleven months but he was invalided back to the UK in August 1917 suffering from neurasthenia. At a medical board in Norwich in November 1917, he was passed as fit for anti-aircraft defence duty but his condition returned and he was sent to a hospital in Birmingham in February 1918 for treatment. By June 1918, he was listed as unfit for further service and relinquished his commission, though retaining the honorary rank of lieutenant and permission to wear his uniform on occasions that necessitated it. He joined the Army again in 1940 following the outbreak of World War II.

== Stage career ==
Maturin (2nd left) in The Great John Ganton at the Aldwych Theatre (1909)

Maturin's theatre appearances included roles in such Broadway productions as Love and the Man at the Knickerbocker Theatre (1905), Myself – Bettina at Daly's Theatre (1908), Leonard Ferris in Mid-Channel at the Empire Theatre (1910), and The Elder Son at the Playhouse Theatre (1914).

Other theatrical appearances included Will Ganton in The Great John Ganton at the Aldwych Theatre (1909), a private performance by the New Players of Oscar Wilde's Salome at the Royal Court Theatre (1911), Randall the Rotter in Heartbreak House (1921), Loyalties at St Martin's Theatre (1922), The Green Hat starring Tallulah Bankhead at the Adelphi Theatre (1925), Espionage at the Apollo Theatre (1935), I Killed the Count at the Whitehall Theatre (1937) and The Day After Tomorrow (1946), starring Phyllis Dare.

For the Birmingham Repertory Theatre in 1928 he played the title role in Macbeth, directed by Barry Jackson and set during World War I. Maturin played the role dressed as a British general.

== Film roles ==
His film roles included Captain Arthur Mason in Wisp o' the Woods (1919), Adrian Redwood in The Naked Man (1923), Major Maurewarde in His House in Order (1928), Frank Sutton in The Squeaker (1930), Hector Braydon in Beyond the Cities (1930), Fenton in The Girl in the Night (1931), Count Fournal in The Face at the Window (1932), James Kelver in The Flaw (1933), The Director in Love, Life and Laughter (1934), Tim Gierson Youthful Folly (1934), Smith in Sanders of the River (1935), Robert Downing in City of Beautiful Nonsense (1935), Nevern in The Price of a Song (1935), Captain Mellock in Bees on the Boat-Deck (1939), The Almost Perfect murder (1939), Passport Officer in Contraband (1940), Older Man in The Foreman Went to France (1942), Colonel Goodhead in The Life and Death of Colonel Blimp (1943), Geoffrey's Father in A Canterbury Tale (1944), Group Capt. Walter Cartwright-Godwall in the BBC's Sunday Night Theatre (1950), Wrexham in Last Holiday (1950), and as Colonel Sebastian Moran in the BBC TV series Sherlock Holmes (1951).

Maturin was a believer in Christian Science. He died at the Edward VII Hospital in London in 1957 aged 74.

== Selected filmography and Television ==
- The Naked Man (1923)
- Beyond the Cities (1930)
- The Squeaker (1930)
- The Girl in the Night (1931)
- The Face at the Window (1932)
- The Flaw (1933)
- Love, Life and Laughter (1934)
- Youthful Folly (1934)
- Sing as You Swing (1937)
- Sunday Night Theatre ('The Indifferent Shepherd', episode) (1950)
- Last Holiday (1950)
