= The Feathered Serpent (1934 film) =

- Enid Stamp-Taylor (left) in the film
- Directed by: Maclean Rogers
- Written by: Kathleen Butler; Maclean Rogers
- Based on: novel The Feathered Serpent by Edgar Wallace
- Produced by: A. George Smith
- Starring: Enid Stamp-Taylor; D. A. Clarke-Smith; Moore Marriott
- Cinematography: Geoffrey Faithfull
- Production company: George Smith Productions
- Distributed by: Columbia Pictures Corporation (UK)
- Release date: December 1934 (UK)
- Running time: 72 minutes
- Country: United Kingdom
- Language: English

The Feathered Serpent is a 1934 British thriller film directed by Maclean Rogers and starring Enid Stamp-Taylor, Tom Helmore and Moore Marriott. It was written by Kathleen Butler and Rogers based on the 1927 novel The Feathered Serpent by Edgar Wallace.

== Preservation status ==
The British Film Institute National Archive holds a collection of stills but no film or video materials.

== Plot ==
When their own investigations into the murder of Joe Farmer stall, Scotland Yard asks newspaper reporter Peter Dewin to assist. He is able to find evidence to put the police on the right track, and the culprit is apprehended. Dewin himself finds love with the murderer's secretary, who is uninvolved with the crime.

== Cast ==
- Enid Stamp-Taylor as Ella Crewe
- Tom Helmore as Peter Dewin
- D. A. Clarke-Smith as Joe Farmer
- Moore Marriott as Harry Hugg
- Molly Fisher as Daphne Olroyd
- Vincent Holman as Inspector Clarke
- Evelyn Roberts as Leicester Crewe
- Iris Baker as Paula Ricks
- O. B. Clarence as George Beale

== Reception ==
The Daily Film Renter wrote: "That Edgar Wallace wrote the original of this tale of scared crooks and mysterious vengeance ensures a narrative with well-varied characters, mystic and baleful happenings, and a swiftly moving climax. The maker and cast of the film have competently preserved this spirit and produced quite a fair entertainment."

Kine Weekly wrote: "This crime drama, adapted from a story by Edgar Wallace, is too involved to make good screen entertainment. The producer has failed to preserve the author's cunning in the weaving of the many threads, and this resulis in complete loss of dramatic continuity."

Picture Show wrote: "Here we have once again the spectacle of a young reporter out-sleuthing the experienced sleuths of Scotland Yard in unmasking a murderer. At times the development is difficult to follow, so many 'red-herrings' are drawn across the trail to prevent us guessing the identity of the criminal, but on the whole it is entertaining."
