= Enid Stamp Taylor =

British actress (1904–1946)

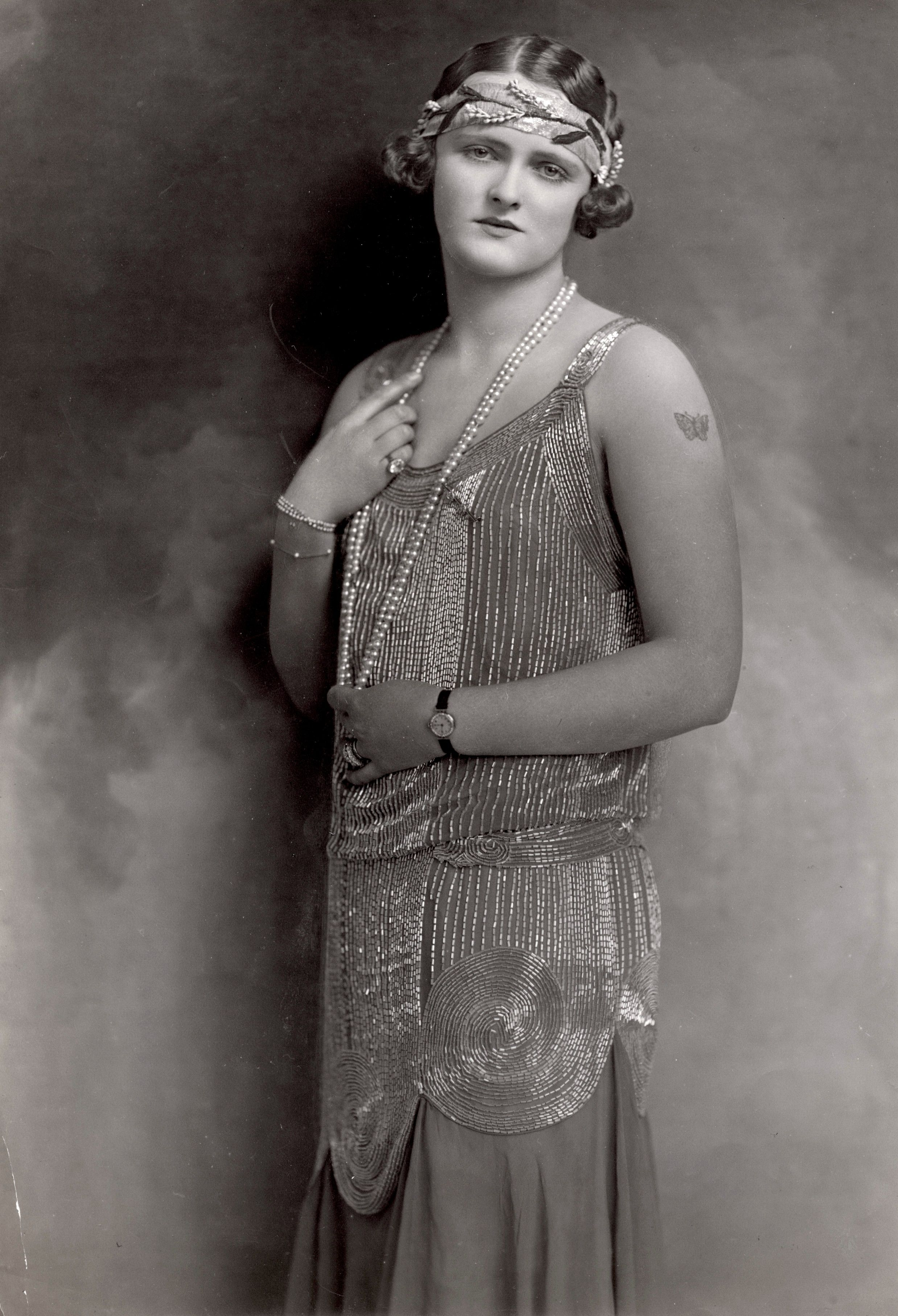
- Born: Enid Georgiana Stamp Taylor; 12 June 1904; Monkseaton, Northumberland (now Tyne and Wear), England
- Died: 13 January 1946 (aged 41); Surrey, England
- Occupation: Actress
- Years active: 1922–1946
- Spouse(s): Sydney Colton (1929-1946; her death); 1 child

Enid Georgiana Stamp Taylor (12 June 1904 – 13 January 1946) was an English actress. Her childhood home was 17, Percy Avenue, in Whitley Bay, Northumberland, in what is now Tyne and Wear.

Taylor first became known when she won a beauty pageant at a young age and this led to parts in musical comedies on stage, including The Cabaret Girl (1922), in which she was billed as simply "Enid Taylor". She progressed to film, appearing in Alfred Hitchcock's Easy Virtue (1928), Queen of Hearts (1934), and The Wicked Lady (1945).

The Stamp part of her name was included as a middle name; it was her grandmother's maiden name. Taylor married Sidney Colton and they had a daughter called Robin Anne who was born in 1933. Her marriage to Colton was dissolved in 1936. On 9 January 1946 she fell in the bathroom of her Park Lane flat and suffered a fractured skull. She was unconscious for three days; she woke briefly following two operations at St George's Hospital in Tooting to remove a blood clot to her brain, but died on the 13 January, two months after the release of her penultimate film, The Wicked Lady. An inquest found that the cause of death was a stroke, which caused her fall and the subsequent skull fracture.

== Partial filmography ==
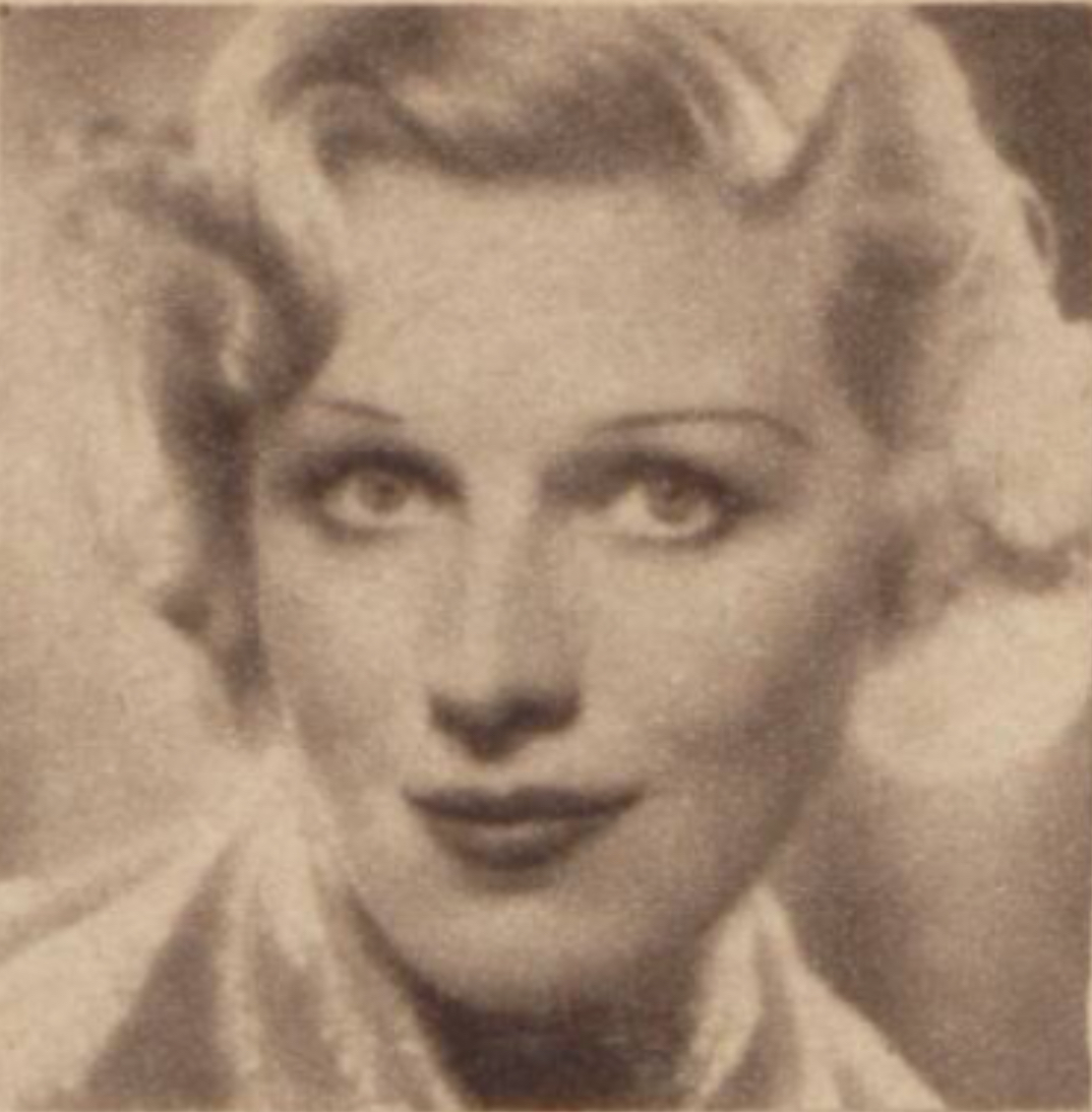
Picturegoer, 1934

- Land of Hope and Glory (1927) - Jane
- Easy Virtue (1928) - Sarah
- A Little Bit of Fluff (1928) - Susie West
- Yellow Stockings (1928) - Nellie Jackson
- Cocktails (1928) - Betty
- The Broken Melody (1929) - Gloria
- Meet My Sister (1933) - Lulu Marsoc
- A Political Party (1934) - Elvira Whitman
- Gay Love (1934) - Marie Hopkins
- Virginia's Husband (1934) - June Haslett
- The Feathered Serpent (1934) - Ella Crewe
- Radio Pirates (1935) (also known as 'Big Ben Calling') - Enid
- So You Won't Talk (1935) - Pauline
- Mr. What's-His-Name? (1935) - Corinne Henfield
- Jimmy Boy (1935) - The Star
- While Parents Sleep (1935) - Lady Cattering
- Two Hearts in Harmony (1935) - Sheila
- Queen of Hearts (1936) - Yvonne
- Blind Man's Bluff (1936) - Sylvia Fairfax
- House Broken (1936) - Cousin Carrie
- Keep Your Seats, Please (1936) - Madame Louise
- Take a Chance (1937) - Cicely Burton
- Action for Slander (1937) - Jenny
- Underneath the Arches (1937) - Dolores
- Feather Your Nest (1937) - Daphne Randall
- O-Kay for Sound (1937) - Jill Smith - Secretary
- Talking Feet (1937) - Sylvia Shirley
- Stepping Toes (1938) - Mrs. Warrington
- Climbing High (1938) - Winnie
- Old Iron (1938) - Eileen Penshaw
- Blondes for Danger (1938) - Valerie
- The Lambeth Walk (1939) - Jacqueline
- The Girl Who Forgot (1940) - Caroline Tonbridge
- Spring Meeting (1941) - Tiny Fox-Collier
- The Farmer's Wife (1941) - Mary Hearne
- South American George (1941) - Frances Martinique
- Hatter's Castle (1942) - Nancy
- Alibi (1942) - Dany
- Candlelight in Algeria (1944) - Maritza
- The Wicked Lady (1945) - Lady Kingsclere
- Caravan (1946) - Bertha (final film role)
