= List of British films of 1940 =

A list of British films released in 1940.

== 1940 ==
Title	Director	Cast	Genre	Notes
1940
21 Days	Basil Dean	Vivien Leigh, Laurence Olivier, Leslie Banks	Drama	Filmed in 1937
All at Sea	Herbert Smith	Sandy Powell, Kay Walsh, John Warwick	Comedy	
At the Villa Rose	Walter Summers	Judy Kelly, Keneth Kent, Clifford Evans	Mystery	
Band Waggon	Marcel Varnel	Arthur Askey, Richard Murdoch, Patricia Kirkwood	Comedy	
The Briggs Family	Herbert Mason	Edward Chapman, Jane Baxter, Austin Trevor	Drama	
Bulldog Sees It Through	Harold Huth	Jack Buchanan, Greta Gynt, Googie Withers	Mystery	
Busman's Honeymoon	Arthur B. Woods	Robert Montgomery, Constance Cummings, Leslie Banks	Mystery	
The Case of the Frightened Lady	George King	Marius Goring, Penelope Dudley-Ward, Helen Haye	Mystery	
Channel Incident	Anthony Asquith	Peggy Ashcroft, Gordon Harker, Robert Newton	Short drama	
Charley's (Big-Hearted) Aunt	Walter Forde	Arthur Askey, Richard Murdoch, Moore Marriott	Comedy	Based on the farce Charley's Aunt
The Chinese Bungalow	George King	Paul Lukas, Kay Walsh, Jane Baxter	Drama	
Contraband	Michael Powell	Conrad Veidt, Valerie Hobson, Hay Petrie	Spy thriller	
Convoy	Pen Tennyson	Clive Brook, John Clements, Judy Campbell	War	
Crimes at the Dark House	George King	Tod Slaughter, Hay Petrie, Margaret Yarde	Thriller	
Crook's Tour	John Baxter	Basil Radford, Naunton Wayne, Greta Gynt	Comedy	
Dead Man's Shoes	Thomas Bentley	Leslie Banks, Judy Kelly, Wilfrid Lawson	Crime drama	
Dr. O'Dowd	Herbert Mason	Shaun Glenville, Peggy Cummins, Patricia Roc	Drama	
The Door with Seven Locks	Norman Lee	Leslie Banks, Lilli Palmer, Gina Malo	Mystery horror	
An Englishman's Home	Albert de Courville	Edmund Gwenn, Mary Maguire, Paul Henreid	Drama	
The Flying Squad	Herbert Brenon	Sebastian Shaw, Phyllis Brooks, Basil Radford	Crime	
For Freedom	Maurice Elvey	Will Fyffe, Anthony Hulme, Guy Middleton	War drama	
Full Speed Ahead	John Hunt	Frederick Peisley, Dinah Sheridan, Morland Graham	Thriller	
Garrison Follies	Maclean Rogers	Barry Lupino, Nancy O'Neil, H.F. Maltby	Comedy	
Gaslight	Thorold Dickinson	Anton Walbrook, Diana Wynyard, Cathleen Cordell	Mystery	
George and Margaret	George King	Marie Lohr, Judy Kelly, Oliver Wakefield	Comedy	
The Girl in the News	Carol Reed	Margaret Lockwood, Barry K. Barnes, Emlyn Williams	Thriller	
The Girl Who Forgot	Adrian Brunel	Elizabeth Allan, Ralph Michael, Enid Stamp-Taylor	Comedy	
Henry Steps Out	Widgey R. Newman	George Turner, Wally Patch, Margaret Yarde	Comedy	
His Brother's Keeper	Roy William Neill	Clifford Evans, Tamara Desni, Reginald Purdell	Drama	
Hoots Mon!	Roy William Neill	Max Miller, Florence Desmond, Hal Walters	Comedy	
The House of the Arrow	Harold French	Kenneth Kent, Diana Churchill, Belle Chrystall	Mystery	
It Happened to One Man	Paul L. Stein	Wilfrid Lawson, Nora Swinburne, Marta Labarr	Drama	
Jailbirds	Oswald Mitchell	Albert Burdon, Harry Terry, Charles Farrell	Comedy crime	
Just William	Graham Cutts	Richard Lupino, Fred Emney, Basil Radford	Comedy	
Laugh It Off	John Baxter	Tommy Trinder, Jean Colin, Marjorie Brown	Musical comedy	
Law and Disorder	David MacDonald	Barry K. Barnes, Diana Churchill, Alastair Sim	Comedy thriller	
Let George Do It!	Marcel Varnel	George Formby, Phyllis Calvert, Garry Marsh	Comedy	
Meet Maxwell Archer	John Paddy Carstairs	John Loder, Marta Labarr, Leueen MacGrath	Mystery	
The Midas Touch	David MacDonald	Barry K. Barnes, Judy Kelly, Frank Cellier	Thriller	
The Middle Watch	Thomas Bentley	Jack Buchanan, Greta Gynt, Kay Walsh	Comedy	
The Missing People	Jack Raymond	Will Fyffe, Kay Walsh, Lyn Harding	Mystery	
Mrs. Pym of Scotland Yard	Fred Ellis	Mary Clare, Edward Lexy, Nigel Patrick	Crime	
Neutral Port	Marcel Varnel	Will Fyffe, Leslie Banks, Phyllis Calvert	War	
Night Train to Munich	Carol Reed	Margaret Lockwood, Rex Harrison, Paul Henreid	Thriller	
Old Mother Riley in Society	John Baxter	Arthur Lucan, Kitty McShane, John Stuart	Comedy	
Old Mother Riley Joins Up	Maclean Rogers	Arthur Lucan, Kitty McShane, Glen Alyn	Comedy	
Olympic Honeymoon	Alfred J. Goulding	Claude Hulbert, Monty Banks, Sally Gray	Comedy	
Pack Up Your Troubles	Oswald Mitchell	Reginald Purdell, Wylie Watson, Patricia Roc	Comedy	
Pastor Hall	Roy Boulting	Wilfrid Lawson, Nova Pilbeam, Marius Goring	Drama	
The Proud Valley	Pen Tennyson	Paul Robeson, Edward Chapman, Edward Rigby	Drama	
Return to Yesterday	Robert Stevenson	Clive Brook, Anna Lee, May Whitty	Drama	
Room for Two	Maurice Elvey	Frances Day, Vic Oliver, Basil Radford	Comedy	
Sailors Don't Care	Oswald Mitchell	Edward Rigby, Jean Gillie, Michael Wilding	Comedy	
Sailors Three	Walter Forde	Tommy Trinder, Claude Hulbert, Michael Wilding	Comedy	
Saloon Bar	Walter Forde	Gordon Harker, Elizabeth Allan, Mervyn Johns	Thriller	
The Second Mr. Bush	John Paddy Carstairs	Kay Walsh, Derrick De Marney, Evelyn Roberts	Comedy	
Shadowed Eyes	Maclean Rogers	Basil Sydney, Patricia Hilliard, Stewart Rome	Crime	
Somewhere in England	John E. Blakeley	Frank Randle, Dan Young, Harry Korris	Comedy	
Spare a Copper	John Paddy Carstairs	George Formby, Dorothy Hyson, John Warwick	Comedy	
The Spider	Maurice Elvey	Derrick De Marney, Diana Churchill, Jean Gillie	Crime	
Spies of the Air	David MacDonald	Barry K. Barnes, Basil Radford, Joan Marion	Adventure	
Spy for a Day	Mario Zampi	Douglas Wakefield, Albert Lieven, Nicholas Hannen	Comedy thriller	
The Stars Look Down	Carol Reed	Michael Redgrave, Margaret Lockwood, Emlyn Williams	Drama	
Ten Days in Paris	Tim Whelan	Rex Harrison, Kaaren Verne, Leo Genn	Thriller	
That's the Ticket	Redd Davis	Sid Field, Hal Walters, Betty Lynne	Comedy	
They Came by Night	Harry Lachman	Will Fyffe, Phyllis Calvert, Anthony Hulme	Crime	
The Thief of Bagdad	Michael Powell, Ludwig Berger, Tim Whelan	Conrad Veidt, Sabu, June Duprez	Fantasy adventure	Outbreak of World War II caused this to be finished in the US.
Three Silent Men	Daniel Birt	Sebastian Shaw, Derrick De Marney, Patricia Roc	Crime	
Tilly of Bloomsbury	Leslie S. Hiscot	Sydney Howard, Jean Gillie, Michael Wilding	Comedy	
Two for Danger	George King	Barry K. Barnes, Greta Gynt, Ian McLean	Crime	
Two Smart Men	Widgey R. Newman	Leslie Fuller, Wally Patch, Margaret Yarde	Comedy	
Under Your Hat	Maurice Elvey	Jack Hulbert, Cicely Courtneidge, Leonora Corbett	Comedy	
Where's That Fire?	Marcel Varnel	Will Hay, Graham Moffatt, Moore Marriott	Comedy	
A Window in London	Herbert Mason	Michael Redgrave, Patricia Roc, Paul Lukas	Thriller	

== See also ==
- 1940 in British music
- 1940 in British television
- 1940 in the United Kingdom
