= Alastair Sim on stage and screen =

Scottish actor

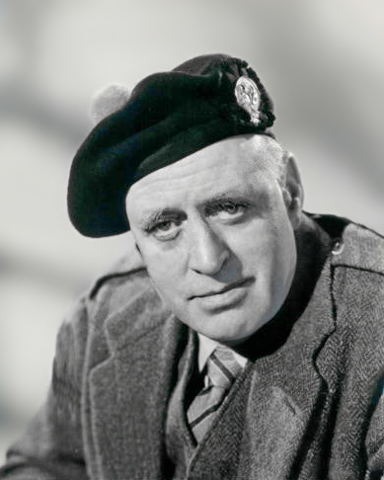
Sim as the Laird in Geordie, 1955

The Scottish actor Alastair Sim (1900–1976) performed in many media of light entertainment, including theatre, film and television. His career spanned from 1930 until his death. During that time he was a "memorable character player of faded Anglo-Scottish gentility, whimsically put-upon countenance, and sepulchral, sometimes minatory, laugh".

After studying chemistry at the University of Edinburgh, he was employed, between 1925 and 1930, as a lecturer in elocution at New College, Edinburgh, and also established his own school of drama and speech training. In 1930 he made his professional stage debut as a messenger in Othello at the Savoy Theatre, London—with Paul Robeson and Peggy Ashcroft in the lead roles. During the next five years he appeared on stage in New York and the UK, and spent two years at the Old Vic.

In 1935 he made his film debut, appearing in The Riverside Murder (dir. Albert Parker); he appeared in four films that year, and five the following. His film career progressed and by the mid-1940s he was a well-known figure in the theatre and cinema. The Times highlighted some of his more notable films, including Green for Danger (1946), The Happiest Days of Your Life (1950), Scrooge (1951), An Inspector Calls (1954), The Green Man (1956) and School for Scoundrels (1960).

Sim had been Rector of the University of Edinburgh in 1951, and was awarded CBE in 1953, although he turned down a knighthood that was offered to him by Edward Heath. His biographer, Bruce Babington, considered that "Sim was the paradigm – authority figure, yes, but often shadily duplicitous, often a manipulator of official rhetoric, his sexless bachelor persona containing strains of sexual ambiguity, his jolliness a latent vampirism." Sim died in August 1976.

== Stage credits ==
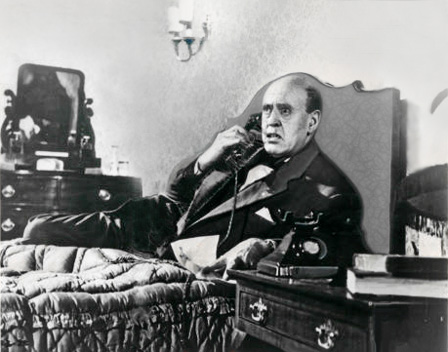
Sim in The Green Man, 1956

Stage credits of Alastair Sim
Production	Date	Theatre (London, unless otherwise noted)	Role	Notes
Othello	19 May 1930	Savoy Theatre	Messenger	
Caviare	December 1930	Little Theatre		Revue
Betrayal	January 1931	Little Theatre	Vasiliy	
The Venetian	25 February 1931	Little Theatre	Cardinal Medici	
The Venetian	31 October 1931	Masque Theatre, New York	Cardinal Medici	
Julius Caesar	January 1932	The Old Vic	Trebonius/Lucilius	
Lincoln	February 1932	The Old Vic	John Wilkes Booth	
Othello	March 1932	The Old Vic	Duke of Venice	
Twelfth Night	March 1932	The Old Vic	Antonio	
Hamlet	April 1932	The Old Vic	King Claudius	
Caesar and Cleopatra	September 1932	The Old Vic	Pothinus	
Cymbeline	October 1932	The Old Vic	Cymbeline	
As You Like It	October 1932	The Old Vic	Duke Senior	
Macbeth	November 1932	The Old Vic	Banquo	
The Winter's Tale	January 1933	The Old Vic	Polixenes	
The Admirable Bashville Or, Constancy Rewarded	February 1933	The Old Vic	Cetewayo	
Mary Stuart	February 1933	The Old Vic	Sir Thomas Randolf	
Romeo and Juliet	March 1933	The Old Vic	Apothecary	
The School for Scandal	March 1933	The Old Vic	Crabtree	
The Tempest	April 1933	The Old Vic	Antonio	
As You Desire Me	September 1933	Gate Theatre	Carl Salter	
The Rose Without a Thorn	November 1933	Duke of York's Theatre	Sir Thomas Audley	
The Man Who Was Fed Up	November 1933	Vaudeville Theatre	Donald Geddes	
The Devil in the News	June 1934	Grafton Theatre	Dominican Friar	
Volpone	October 1934	Fortune Theatre	Voltore	One performance
The Life That I Gave Him	October 1934	Little Theatre	Don Giorgio	
Murder Trial	October 1934	Little Theatre	The Judge	
Youth at the Helm	November 1934	Westminster Theatre	Ponsonby	
Lady Precious Stream	November 1934	Little Theatre	General Wei	
Alice in Wonderland	December 1934	Duke of York's Theatre	The Mad Hatter	
Youth at the Helm	February 1935	Globe	Ponsonby	
The Squeaker	March 1937	Strand Theatre	Collie	
The Gusher	July 1937	Prince's Theatre	Peter Bogle	
What Say They?	1939	Malvern Festival	Professor Hayman	
Old Master	1939	Malvern Festival	Vane Barra	
You of all People	November 1939	Prince of Wales Theatre	Portwine	
What Say They?	March 1940	Golders Green Theatre	Professor Hayman	
Cottage to Let	July 1940	Wyndham's Theatre	Charles Dimble	
Cottage to Let	May 1941	Wyndham's Theatre	Charles Dimble	
Peter Pan	24 December 1941	Adelphi Theatre	Captain Hook & Mr Darling	
Peter Pan	December 1942	Winter Garden Theatre	Captain Hook & Mr Darling	
Mr Bolfry	August 1943	Westminster Theatre	Mr McCrimmon	Also director
It Depends What You Mean	October 1944	Westminster Theatre	Reverend William Paris	Also director
The Forrigan Reel	October 1945	Sadler's Wells Theatre	Old MacAlpin	Also director
Death of a Rat	January 1946	Lyric Theatre	Wouterson	
Peter Pan	December 1946	Scala Theatre	Captain Hook	
Dr Angelus	July 1947	Phoenix Theatre	Dr Angelus	Also director
The Anatomist	November 1948	Westminster Theatre	Dr Knox	Also director
Mr Gillie	9 March 1950	Garrick Theatre	Mr Gillie	Also director
Mr Bolfry	August 1956	Aldwych Theatre	Mr Bolfry	Also director
The Brass Butterfly	April 1958	Strand Theatre	Emperor	Also director
The Bargain	January 1961	St Martin's Theatre	George Selwyn	Also director
The Tempest	May 1962	The Old Vic	Prospero	
Windfall	July 1963	Lyric Theatre	Alexander Lindsay	Also director
Peter Pan	14 December 1963	Scala Theatre	Captain Hook	
The Merchant of Venice	September 1964	Nottingham Playhouse	Shylock	
Peter Pan	December 1964	Scala Theatre	Captain Hook	
The Elephant's Foot	19 April 1965	Touring	Freer	Also director
Too True to Be Good	22 September 1965	Strand Theatre	Colonel Tallboys	
The Clandestine Marriage	31 May 1966	Chichester Festival Theatre	Lord Ogleby	
Number 10	29 August 1967	Strand Theatre	Patrick Pyrton	
Peter Pan	December 1968	Scala Theatre	Captain Hook	
The Magistrate	18 September 1969	Chichester Festival Theatre	Mr Poskitt	
The Jockey Club Stakes	30 September 1970	Vaudeville Theatre	Marquis of Candover	
Siege	17 January 1972	Cambridge Theatre	Willy	
A Private Matter	15 January 1973	Vaudeville Theatre	Marvyn Dakyns	
Dandy Dick	24 July 1973	Chichester Festival Theatre	Augustine Judd	
Dandy Dick	17 October 1973	Garrick Theatre	Augustine Judd	
The Clandestine Marriage	8 April 1975	Savoy Theatre	Lord Ogleby	

== Filmography ==
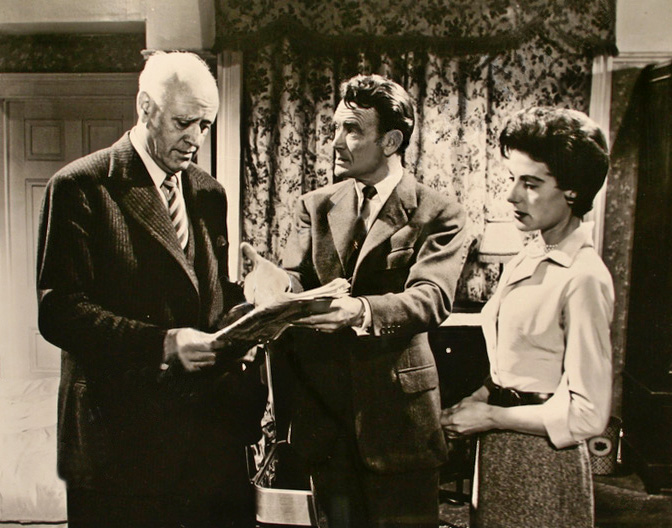
Sim in Escapade, 1955

Filmography of Sim
Film	Year	Role	Ref.
The Riverside Murder	1935	Sgt 'Mack' McKay	
The Private Secretary	1935	Mr Nebulae	
Late Extra	1935	MacPherson	
A Fire Has Been Arranged	1935	Cutte	
The Case of Gabriel Perry	1935	Minor role (uncredited)	
Wedding Group	1936	Angus Graham	
Troubled Waters	1936	Mac MacTavish	
The Man in the Mirror	1936	Mannering	
Keep Your Seats, Please	1936	A. S. Drayton	
The Big Noise	1936	Finny	
Strange Experiment	1937	'Pop' Lawler	
A Romance in Flanders	1937	Colonel Wexton	
Melody and Romance	1937	Professor Williams	
Clothes and the Woman	1937	Francois	
Gangway	1937	Detective Taggett	
The Squeaker	1937	Joshua Collie	
This Man Is News	1938	Lochlan Macgregor	
The Terror	1938	Soapy Marks	
Sailing Along	1938	Sylvester	
Alf's Button Afloat	1938	The Genie of the Button	
Climbing High	1938	Max	
This Man in Paris	1939	Lochlan Macgregor	
The Mysterious Mr. Davis	1939	George, the lunatic	
Inspector Hornleigh	1939	Sergeant Bingham	
Inspector Hornleigh on Holiday	1939	Sergeant Bingham	
Law and Disorder	1940	Samuel Blight	
Inspector Hornleigh Goes To It	1941	Sergeant Bingham	
Cottage to Let	1941	Charles Dimble	
Her Father's Daughter	1941	Mr McForrest	
Let the People Sing	1942	Professor Ernst Kronak	
Nero (Note: Short film on behalf of the Ministry of Fuel)	1943	Nero	
Waterloo Road	1945	Dr Montgomery	
Green for Danger	1946	Inspector Cockrill	
Captain Boycott	1947	Father McKeogh	
Hue and Cry	1947	Felix H. Wilkinson	
London Belongs to Me	1948	Henry Squales	
Stage Fright	1950	Commodore Gill	
The Happiest Days of Your Life	1950	Wetherby Pond	
Laughter in Paradise	1951	Deniston Russell	
Lady Godiva Rides Again	1951	Mr. Murington (uncredited)	
Scrooge	1951	Ebenezer Scrooge	
Innocents in Paris	1952	Sir Norman Barker	
Folly to Be Wise	1953	Rev. William Paris	
The Belles of St. Trinian's	1954	Miss Millicent Fritton/Clarence Fritton	
An Inspector Calls	1954	Inspector Poole	
Geordie	1955	The Laird	
Escapade	1955	Dr Skillingsworth	
The Green Man	1956	Harry Hawkins	
Blue Murder at St Trinian's	1957	Miss Amelia Fritton	
The Doctor's Dilemma	1958	Cutler Walpole	
Left Right and Centre	1959	Lord Wilcot	
The Millionairess	1960	Julius Sagamore	
School for Scoundrels	1960	Stephen Potter	
The Ruling Class	1972	Bishop Lampton	
Royal Flash	1975	Mr Greig	
Escape from the Dark	1976	Lord Harrogate	

== Television ==
Television appearances of Sim
Programme	Date	Channel	Role	Notes
Mr. Gillie	25 July 1950	BBC	Mr Gillie	Television film
Play of the Week	6 February 1956	ITV	Dr Knox	"The Anatomist"
Misleading Cases	20 June 1967 – 25 July 1967	BBC	Mr Justice Swallow	6 episodes
Cold Comfort Farm	22 June 1968 – 6 July 1968	BBC	Amos Starkadder	3 episodes
Misleading Cases	18 September 1968 – 30 October 1968	BBC	Mr Justice Swallow	6 episodes
Misleading Cases	30 July 1971 – 10 September 1971	BBC	Mr Justice Swallow	6 episodes
A Christmas Carol	21 December 1971	ABC	Ebenezer Scrooge (voice)	Television film
Play for Today	20 November 1972	BBC	General Suffolk	"The General's Day"
The Prodigal Daughter	5 January 1975	ITV	Father Perfect	Television film
Rogue Male	22 September 1976	BBC	The Earl	Television film

== Notes and references ==
Notes

== Sources ==
- Gilbert, Michael (2010). "Sim, Alastair George Bell (1900–1976)". Oxford Dictionary of National Biography (online ed.). Oxford University Press. doi:10.1093/ref:odnb/31686. (Subscription, Wikipedia Library access or UK public library membership required.)
- Herbert, Ian (1978). Who's Who in the Theatre: a Biographical Record of the Contemporary Stage. London: Pitman Publishing. ISBN 978-0-273-01195-8.
- Rowell, George (1993). The Old Vic Theatre: A History. Cambridge: Cambridge University Press. ISBN 978-0-521-34625-2.
- Simpson, Mark (2009). Alastair Sim: The star of Scrooge and The Belles of St Trinian's. Stroud, Gloucestershire: The History Press. ISBN 978-0-7524-5372-9.
- Wearing, J. P. (2014). The London Stage 1930–1939: A Calendar of Productions, Performers, and Personnel. Lanham, MA: Rowman & Littlefield. ISBN 978-0-8108-9304-7.
