= The Silver Spoon =

1933 film

- Frame from the film
- Directed by: George King
- Written by: Brock Williams
- Produced by: Irving Asher
- Starring: Ian Hunter; Garry Marsh; Binnie Barnes
- Cinematography: Basil Emmott
- Production company: Warner Brothers-First National Productions
- Distributed by: Warner Brothers
- Release date: 20 December 1933
- Running time: 64 minutes
- Country: United Kingdom
- Language: English

The Silver Spoon is a 1933 British comedy crime film directed by George King and starring Ian Hunter, Garry Marsh and Cecil Parker. It was written by Brock Williams and produced as a quota quickie by Warner Brothers. It was shot at the company's Teddington Studios in London.

== Preservation status ==
The British Film Institute has classed The Silver Spoon as a lost film. Its National Archive holds a collection of stills but no film or video materials.

== Synopsis ==
A homeless man admits to a murder he did not commit in order to protect a woman.

== Cast ==
- Ian Hunter as Captain Watts-Winyard
- Garry Marsh as Hon. Roland Stone
- Binnie Barnes as Lady Perivale
- Cecil Parker as Trevor
- Cecil Humphreys as Lord Perivale
- Joan Playfair as Denise
- O. B. Clarence as Parker
- George Merritt as Inspector Innes

== Reception ==
Kine Weekly wrote: "Ian Hunter and Garry Marsh ... hard as they try, fail to invest their parts with conviction or interpret them in the right spirit. Binnie Barnes is not in her happiest mood as Lady Perivale, and the support is commonplace. ... Subject is essentially fantastic and needs airy, subtle handling. Robbed of treatment it demands it quickly degenerates into very ordinary comedy, the humour of which is addressed to the unsophisticated."

The Daily Film Renter wrote: "This simple story has been spoiled by hurried direction. Had more time been spent on its production, the scenes in which the tramps confess to the murder, because they think Lady Perivale is guilty, could have been quite amusing. Ian Hunter and Garry Marsh, as Captain Watts-Winyard and the Hon. Roland Stone respectively, try hard with poor material, while Binnie Barnes fails to convince as Lady Perivale. Little help is forthcoming from the supporting players, with the exception of O. B. Clarence in the very minor part of a clerk."

Picturegoer wrote: "Very ordinary comedy of an unsophisticated order, with a central idea which, with imaginative treatment, might have been made very amusing. Acting is fair, as is the production."

Picture Show wrote: "The straightforward telling of a very incredible story robs this film of interest. It deals with the improbable adventures of two gentlemen tramps, and neither direction nor acting helps."
