= This Man Is News =

This Man is News
- Directed by: David MacDonald
- Written by: Basil Dearden; Roger MacDougall; Allan MacKinnon
- Produced by: Anthony Havelock-Allan
- Starring: Barry K. Barnes; Valerie Hobson; Alastair Sim; Edward Lexy
- Cinematography: Henry Harris
- Edited by: Reginald Beck
- Production company: Pinebrook Studios
- Distributed by: Paramount British Pictures
- Release date: September 1938
- Running time: 77 minutes
- Country: United Kingdom
- Language: English
- Budget: £6,000 or £14,000

This Man is News is a 1938 British comedy mystery film directed by David MacDonald and starring Barry K. Barnes, Valerie Hobson, Alastair Sim and Edward Lexy. It was written by Basil Dearden, Roger MacDougall and Allan MacKinnon. The screenplay concerns a journalist who solves a crime of which he himself is suspected.

It was loosely modelled on the American Thin Man series of films. A sequel, This Man in Paris, was made in 1939.

== Plot ==
Simon Drake has predicted the death of a prominent man in advance, which makes him Scotland Yard's top suspect for his murder; the only one who believes in his innocence is his loyal wife Pat. Meanwhile, Macgregor is Drake's beleaguered city editor, who hires and fires him multiple times depending on how guilty or innocent he looks at the moment.

== Cast ==
- Barry K. Barnes as Simon Drake
- Valerie Hobson as Pat Drake
- Alastair Sim as Lochlan Macgregor
- Edward Lexy as Inspector Hollis
- Garry Marsh as Sergeant Bright
- John Warwick as Johnnie Clayton
- Philip Leaver as "Harelip" Murphy
- James Birrie as Doyle
- David Keir as Brown

== Production ==
A "quota quickie", it was made for a mere £6,000, but "was among the highest grossing films of 1938". A contemporary account said it was made for under £15,000.

== Reception ==
=== Box office ===
Kinematograph Weekly reported the film did well at the British box office in December 1938.

=== Critical ===
The Monthly Film Bulletin wrote: "Filmgoers who have seen The Thin Man will have no difficulty in identifying the situations in this picture – nor will those who are familiar with the chaos and comedy of American newspaper films. The recipe is well tested and a sample of good, plain English cooking. It is all good fun and extremely well acted. Barry K. Barnes is a likeable Drake, Valerie Hobson a pretty and intelligent, if rather callous, Mrs. Drake and Alastair Sim a brilliantly comic Macgregor."

Kine Weekly wrote: "Story invention is prolific and, what is more, it is securely wedded to plausibility. The Thin Man touch is borrowed without affront to English atmosphere. Grand, teamwork on the part of Barry K. Barnes, Valerie Hobson and Alastair Sim, and resourceful imaginative direction, are the major contributions to the entertainment's unqualified success. Ther are thrills and laughs in plenty."

TV Guide gave the film three out of five stars and wrote, "Though Barnes and Hobson may not quite be another William Powell and Myrna Loy, they handle the assignment with humor and great style. The film is directed with energy and the dialogue helps carry the brisk pace along. This is the first screenwriting credit for Basil Dearden, who would go on to do many stories, both serious and topical, in association with noted British producer and art director Michael Relph."
