= Dancing with Crime =

1947 British film by John Paddy Carstairs

- Directed by: John Paddy Carstairs
- Written by: Brock Williams
- Based on: story by Peter Fraser
- Produced by: James Carter
- Starring: Richard Attenborough; Barry K. Barnes; Sheila Sim
- Cinematography: Reginald Wyer
- Edited by: Eily Boland
- Music by: Benjamin Frankel
- Production company: Coronet Films
- Distributed by: Paramount British Pictures
- Release date: 25 June 1947
- Running time: 83 minutes
- Country: United Kingdom
- Language: English
- Budget: £200,000

Dancing with Crime is a 1947 British film noir film directed by John Paddy Carstairs, starring Richard Attenborough, Barry K. Barnes and Sheila Sim. A man hunts down the killer of his lifelong friend.

== Plot ==
Boyhood friends and later comrades in the Army, Ted Peters and Dave Robinson are back in civvies. Ted becomes a taxi driver and hopes to marry Joy Goodall, a pretty chorus girl. Dave, seeking easy money, joins a criminal gang headed by Mr Gregory, which has its headquarters in a suburban palais-de-danse. Dave is shot by Paul Baker, Gregory's right-hand man, and staggers, fatally wounded, into the back of Ted's taxicab while Ted is away. When Ted returns to find Dave's body in his cab, he resolves to find the murderer. Ted suspects Baker, so Joy becomes a hostess at the gang's nightclub, to do some snooping. They bring about the downfall of the gang.

== Cast ==
- Richard Attenborough as Ted Peters
- Barry K. Barnes as Paul Baker
- Sheila Sim as Joy Goodall
- Garry Marsh as Detective Sergeant Murray
- John Warwick as Inspector Carter
- Judy Kelly as Toni Masters
- Barry Jones as Mr. Gregory
- Bill Owen as Dave Robinson
- Cyril Chamberlain as Sniffy
- Peter Croft as Johnny
- Dirk Bogarde as police radio caller (uncredited)
- Patricia Dainton as Pam (uncredited)
- Diana Dors as Annette (uncredited)
- Danny Green as Sid (uncredited)
- Bartlett Mullins as club barman (uncredited)
- John Salew as Pogson (uncredited)
- Dennis Wyndham as Sam (uncredited)

== Production ==
Attenborough was borrowed from the Boulting Brothers. He and Sheila Sim were married in real life; this was their first movie together.

The film was shot at Southall Studios with sets designed by the art director Andrew Mazzei. Filming was difficult due to the freezing cold weather.

== Critical reception ==
Kine Weekly said "Robust gangster comedy melodrama, set around a London palais de danse.The plot is tackled with infectious and disarming enthusiasm by a well-chosen cast and set in convincing and colourful atmosphere. The direction is artfully tongue-in-the-cheek. Good fun and no mean thriller."

Monthly Film Bulletin said "Set against a background of unfashionable London streets, warehouses and the chromium-plated dance-hall, the film bears evidence of capable direction. Its characters are plausible, except for the incredulous detectives, and the actors on the guilty side, headed by Barry Jones and Barry K. Barnes, who are unpleasantly convincing. For the innocents, Richard Attenborough makes a likeable Ted and is modestly partnered by Sheila Sim. A full measure."

Variety called it "fashioned on formula grounds."

In British Sound Films: The Studio Years 1928–1959 David Quinlan rated the film as "good", writing: "Not exactly convincing, but a confident piece of filmcraft."

Leslie Halliwell wrote: "Tolerable post-war melodrama aping Hollywood."

The Radio Times Guide to Films gave the film 2/5 stars, writing: "Real-life newlyweds Richard Attenborough and Sheila Sim co-star in this stark crime quickie, which also marks the feature debut of Dirk Bogarde as a bobby on the beat. [...] With Sim going undercover at the local dance hall, the film will evoke memories of Saturday nights gone by."
