= Farewell Again =

1937 film

- Directed by: Tim Whelan
- Written by: Clemence Dane; Ian Hay; Wolfgang Wilhelm; Henry Koster; Patrick Kirwan
- Produced by: Erich Pommer; Alexander Korda (uncredited)
- Starring: Leslie Banks; Flora Robson; Robert Newton; Sebastian Shaw
- Cinematography: James Wong Howe; Hans Schneeberger
- Edited by: Jack Dennis
- Music by: Richard Addinsell; Direction, Muir Mathieson
- Production company: London Film Productions
- Distributed by: United Artists
- Release date: 15 May 1937
- Running time: 85 minutes
- Country: United Kingdom
- Language: English

Farewell Again (U.S. title: Troopship) is a 1937 British drama film directed by Tim Whelan and starring Leslie Banks, Flora Robson, Sebastian Shaw and Robert Newton. It was written by Clemence Dane, Ian Hay, Wolfgang Wilhelm, Henry Koster and Patrick Kirwan. The film was made at Denham Studios by Alexander Korda's London Film Productions.

The film is a portmanteau illustrating the calls of duty on various soldiers and their families.

It was re-issued in Britain in 1942 and 1944.

== Cast ==
- Leslie Banks as Colonel Harry Blair
- Flora Robson as Lucy Blair
- Sebastian Shaw as Captain Gilbert Reed
- Patricia Hilliard as Ann Harrison
- Robert Cochran as Carlisle
- Anthony Bushell as Roddy Hammond
- Rene Ray as Elsie Wainwright
- Robert Newton as Jim Carter
- Leonora Corbett as Lady Joan
- J.H. Roberts as Doctor Pearson
- Eliot Makeham as Major Swayle
- Martita Hunt as Adela Swayle
- Edward Lexy as Sergeant Brough
- Maire O'Neill as Mrs Brough
- Wally Patch as Sergeant Major Pearson
- Margaret Moffatt as Mrs Billings
- Gertrude Musgrove as Lily Toff
- Alf Goddard as Private Bulger
- John Laurie as Private McAllister
- Jerry Verno as Private Judd
- William Hartnell in minor role

== Reception ==
The Monthly Film Bulletin wrote: "Whether or not it was conceived as such, Farewell Again is a moving tribute to the men who serve in the British Army and as a production it's an outstanding achievement. The scenario has been so written that while attention is consecutively concentrated on the personal affairs of a number of individuals, each of them contributes to the whole. ... The total result is an outstanding film which deals with real people and presents something real about England, however objectionable this reality and, therefore, the film may be distasteful to some people in its propaganda implications."

Kine Weekly wrote: "There is next to no story, but the character drawing is exceedingly good, the atmosphere is obviously authentic, and the sentiment is true blue. For what it is the film definitely has merit, but its shrewdest piece of showmanship is the aptness of its flagrant propaganda."

Variety wrote: "Decidedly good entertainment for the intelligent, and equally acceptable for the general public. ... Praise for the fine work of the principals, without equal commendation for the bit parts, would be unfair criticism. ... It ought to please the American public, despite the 100% British atmosphere."
