= Let's Be Famous =

- Directed by: Walter Forde
- Written by: Roger MacDougall; Allan MacKinnon
- Produced by: Michael Balcon
- Starring: Jimmy O'Dea
- Cinematography: Gordon Dines; Ronald Neame
- Edited by: Ray Pitt
- Music by: Ernest Irving; Jack Beaver
- Production company: Associated Talking Pictures
- Distributed by: Associated British
- Release date: March 1939
- Running time: 83 minutes
- Country: United Kingdom
- Language: English
- Budget: £21,393

Let's Be Famous is a 1939 British musical comedy film directed by Walter Forde and starring Jimmy O'Dea, Betty Driver and Sonnie Hale. It was written by Roger MacDougall and Allan MacKinnon.

== Plot ==
Amateur singer and stage-struck shopkeeper Jimmy Houlihan travels to London to enter a BBC radio singing competition. It turns out, however, that he has been entered in a spelling bee.

== Cast ==
- Jimmy O'Dea as Jimmy Houlihan
- Betty Driver as Betty Pinbright
- Sonnie Hale as Finch
- Patrick Barr as Johnny Blake
- Basil Radford as Watson
- Milton Rosmer as Albert Pinbright
- Lena Brown as Polly Pinbright
- Henry Hallett as Grenville
- Garry Marsh as BBC official
- Franklyn Bellamy as Ali Benali (as Franklin Bellamy)
- Hay Plumb as announcer
- Alf Goddard as Battling Bulger
- Raymond Huntley as singer in trio (uncredited)
- Jack Vyvyan as Alfie

== Production ==
The film was made by Associated Talking Pictures, with shooting beginning in November 1938. The film's art direction was by the Austrian Oscar Werndorff, in his final production.

== Reception ==
The Monthly Film Bulletin wrote: "With sprightly direction, Noel Gay's music, and the feeling that the actors are enjoying it all even more than the audience, this unpretentious film provides laughs from beginning to end. Jimmy O'Dea and Sonnie Hale make a good team and they are strongly supported by the rest of the cast."

Kine Weekly wrote: "The Irish opening is a little protracted, but there is never a let-down in the laughter once the principal characters are brought together. The B.B.C. spelling bee sequences, the rehearsing of the parachute stunt, and the stunt itself, and the final touch of burlesque played out in a French broadcasting station, are funny enough to offset initial criticism. Song and musical embellishment generally are, incidentally, put over with pep and infectious virtuosity. In brief, a lively romp."

Picture Show wrote: "Bright entertainment is provided by Jimmy O'Dea, Betty Driver and Sonnie Hale in this comedy of an Irish villager who brags about his voice, and mistakes an invitation to join a spelling bee for one to sing at a concert for the B.B.C. This results in him having some comical adventures which conclude in a riotously funny broadcasting scene."
