= The Silent Battle (1939 film) =

- UK pressbook cover
- Directed by: Herbert Mason
- Written by: Wolfgang Wilhelm; Rodney Ackland; Emeric Pressburger (uncredited)
- Based on: the novel "Le Poisson Chinois" by Jean Bommart
- Produced by: Anthony Havelock-Allan
- Starring: Rex Harrison; Valerie Hobson; John Loder
- Cinematography: Bernard Browne
- Edited by: Philip Charlot
- Music by: Francis Chagrin
- Production company: Pinebrook Studios
- Distributed by: Paramount British Pictures (UK)
- Release dates: March 1939 (UK); 1 March 1942 (U.S.)
- Running time: 73 minutes
- Country: United Kingdom
- Language: English

The Silent Battle (also lnown as Continental Express and Peace in our Time) is a 1939 British thriller film directed by Herbert Mason and produced by Anthony Havelock-Allan for Pinebrook Studios. The cast includes Rex Harrison, Valerie Hobson and John Loder. It marked the film debut of Megs Jenkins. It was inspired by the novel Le Poisson Chinois by Jean Bommart. Secret agents try to defeat terrorists on the Orient Express. The film was distributed by Paramount British Pictures.

It is a remake of the French film The Silent Battle (1937).

== Cast ==
- Rex Harrison as Jacques Sauvin
- Valerie Hobson as Draguisha
- John Loder as Bordier
- Muriel Aked as Madame Duvivier
- George Devine as Sonneman
- John Salew as Ernest
- Kaye Seeley as Bostoff
- Carl Jaffe as Rykoff
- Megs Jenkins as Louise
- Arthur Maude as editor

== Release ==
The Silent Battle was released to cinemas in the United Kingdom in March 1939.

== Critical reception ==
Kine Weekly wrote: "Rex Harrison is both convincing and interesting as the mysterious Sauvin, and Valerie Hobson is effective as the girl. John Loder handles a straight romantic lead efficiently, and good performances in support are contributed by Muriel Aked as a tourist, and Kaye Seely as the crooked armament king. ... Atmosphere of international intrigue and espionage is skilfully built up while suspenseful incident, culminating in kidnapping and blowing up of munitions dump always grips attention and offsets highly imaginative plot."

Picturegoer wrote: "Rex Harrison is more convincing than the story as a mysterious agent and Valerie Hobson is good as the daughter of a Balkan politician who gets involved with revolutionaries. John Loder is sound as a journalist; a straight romantic lead."

Picture Show wrote: "Rex Harrison gives a polished performance as the imperturbable Secret Service man, and John Loder and Valerie Hobson are excellent as the reporter and the girl. Villainy is well handled, and Muriel Aked and Meg Jenkins deserve special mention for their comedy work"

TV Guide wrote, "Competent prewar spy drama with a fairly talented cast, but it doesn't pack the action or suspense of the great espionage drama Night Train to Munich (1940), also starring Harrison."
