= The Gang's All Here (1939 film) =

- Spanish poster
- Directed by: Thornton Freeland
- Written by: Ralph Spence
- Produced by: John W. Gossage; Walter C. Mycroft
- Starring: Jack Buchanan
- Cinematography: Claude Friese-Greene
- Edited by: Edward B. Jarvis
- Music by: Harry Acres (uncredited)
- Production company: Associated British Picture Corporation
- Distributed by: Associated British Film Distributors (UK); PRC (US)
- Release date: 4 March 1939 (London UK)
- Running time: 71 minutes
- Country: United Kingdom
- Language: English
- Budget: £75,317

The Gang's All Here is a 1939 British black-and-white comedy-mystery, directed by Thornton Freeland and starring Jack Buchanan and Googie Withers. It was produced by Associated British Picture Corporation and released in the U.S. in 1943 as The Amazing Mr. Forrest.

It is the sequel to Smash and Grab (1937), with Buchanan and Withers reprising their roles.

== Plot ==
John Forrest is a top investigator for the Stamford Insurance Company. Retiring from the firm, he intends to devote the rest of his life to writing detective fiction, but his plan is foiled when his former employers are robbed of $1,000,000 in jewels belonging to foreign potentate Prince Homouska. With the help of his befuddled butler Treadwell, Forrest follows the trail of clues to American gangster boss Chadwick, capturing his quarry with a variety of slapstick subterfuges.

== Cast ==
- Jack Buchanan as John Forrest
- Googie Withers as Alice Forrest
- Edward Everett Horton as Treadwell
- Syd Walker as Younce
- Otto Kruger as Mike Chadwick
- Jack La Rue as Alberni
- Walter Rilla as Prince Homouska
- David Burns as Beretti
- Charles Carson as Charles Cartwright
- Leslie Perrins as Harper
- Ronald Shiner as Spider Ferris
- Edward Lexy as Inspector Elroyd
- Ballard Berkeley as detective in nightclub
- Robb Wilton as Barman

== Critical reception ==
Kine Weekly wrote: "Really bright gags flow swiftly, punctuation being aptly provided by unexpected thrills. ... Class is further represented by the smartness of the dialogue and the elegance and smoothness of the technical presentation."

Variety said: "The story and its method of telling have in it innumerable surefire farcical ingredients, is played by a carefully selected cast and is competently produced."

In British Sound Films: The Studio Years 1928–1959 David Quinlan rated the film as “average” and wrote: “Farce-thriller marks Buchanan’s second fling as Forrest.

Leslie Halliwell said: "Lively comedy-melodrama."

TV Guide wrote: "supposed comedy about the breakup of a group of jewel thieves falls flat. But no amount of dreary material can conceal the undeniable comic genius of Horton".

Allmovie noted: "The Gang's All Here remains one of Jack Buchanan's best-loved vehicles."
