= Roger Livesey =

British actor (1906–1976)

- Livesey in the 1943 film The Life and Death of Colonel Blimp
- Born: 25 June 1906; Barry, Wales
- Died: 4 February 1976 (aged 69); Watford, England
- Occupation: Actor
- Years active: 1921–1975
- Spouse: Ursula Jeans (m. 1937; died 1973)

Roger Livesey (25 June 1906 – 4 February 1976) was a British stage and film actor. He is most often remembered for the three celebrated Powell & Pressburger films in which he successively starred between 1943 and 1946; The Life and Death of Colonel Blimp, I Know Where I'm Going! and A Matter of Life and Death. Tall and broad with a mop of chestnut hair, Livesey used his highly distinctive husky voice, gentle manner and athletic physique to create many notable roles in his theatre and film work.

== Early life ==
Livesey was born in Barry, Wales, son of actor Joseph Livesey (1880-1911) and Mary Catherine ("Cassie"), née Edwards. It had previously been believed and reported that his father was in fact Joseph's brother, actor Samuel Livesey, to whom Mary Catherine Edwards was married after Joseph's death. Her sister was Samuel Livesey's first wife. Roger Livesey was educated at Westminster City School, London.

== Acting career ==
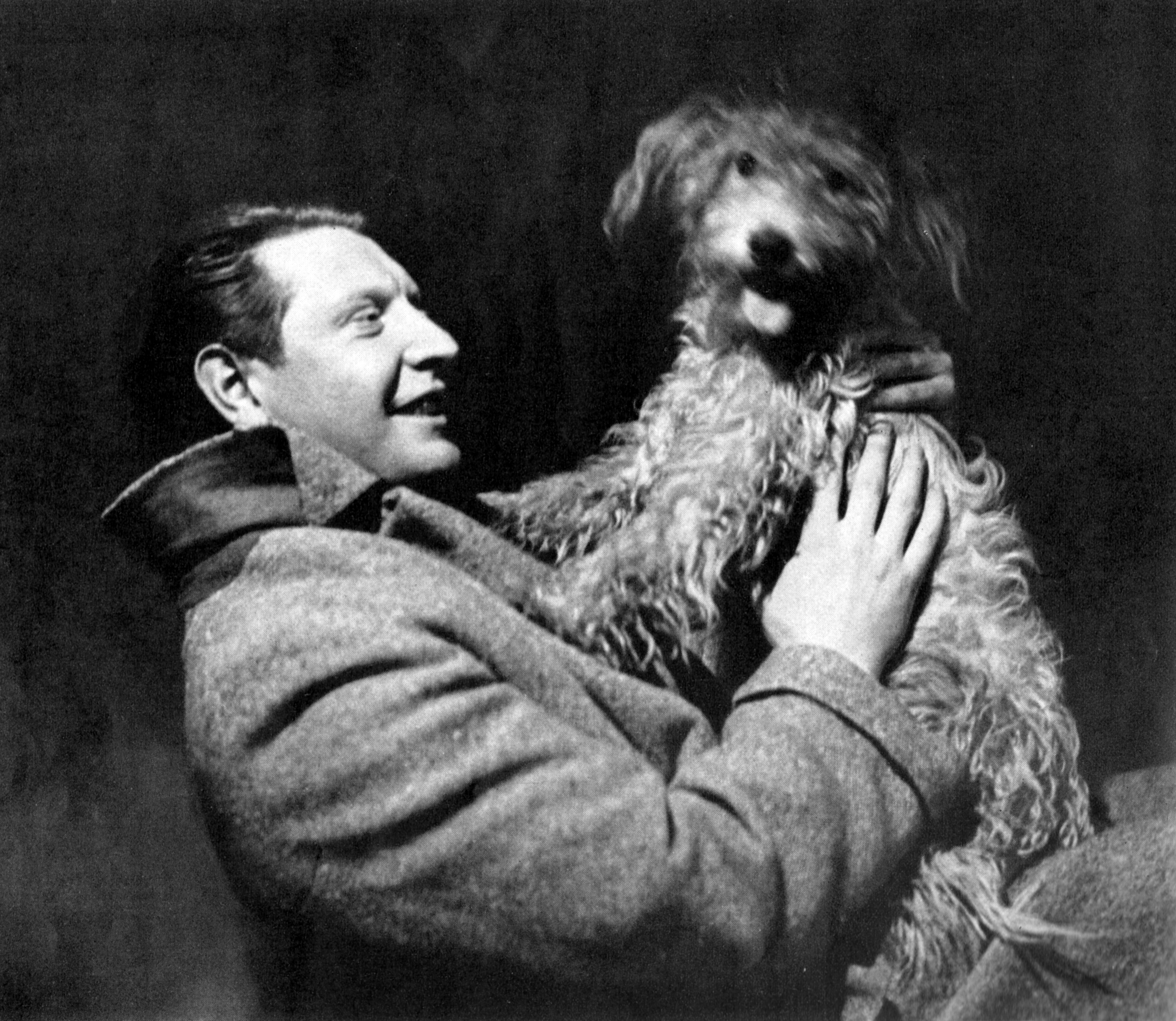
Roger Livesey and his canine co-star in the Theatre Guild production Storm Over Patsy (1937)

Livesey studied under Italia Conti. His first stage role was as the office boy in Loyalty at St James's Theatre in 1917. He then appeared in a wide range of productions from Shakespeare to modern comedies. He played various roles in the West End from 1920 to 1926, toured the West Indies and South Africa, and then returned to join the Old Vic/Sadler's Wells company from September 1932 until May 1934. In 1936 he appeared in New York City in Wycherley's comedy The Country Wife. While in New York he married actress Ursula Jeans, whom he had known previously in England (Livesey's sister Maggie was already married to Ursula Jeans' brother Desmond).

At the outbreak of the Second World War Livesey and Jeans were among the first volunteers to entertain the troops. He then applied for flying duties in the Royal Air Force but due to his age was rejected. Instead he worked in an aircraft factory at Desford aerodrome near Leicester to "do his bit for the war effort".

Livesey was chosen by Michael Powell to play the lead in The Life and Death of Colonel Blimp (1943) after Powell was denied his original choice, Laurence Olivier (Winston Churchill had objected to the film and the Fleet Air Arm refused to release Olivier, who had been a Hollywood film star before returning to England to take a Navy commission). The film was shown in New York and established Livesey's international reputation as a talented character actor. In 1945, he was the first choice for the male lead role in Brief Encounter, which in the end went to Trevor Howard.

He toured Australia from 1956 to 1958 playing Jimmy Broadbent in The Reluctant Debutante and continued playing many theatrical roles during his film career until 1969. One of his last roles was as the Duke of St Bungay in The Pallisers television series. His final television appearance was in the series Benjamin Franklin in 1975.

== Death ==
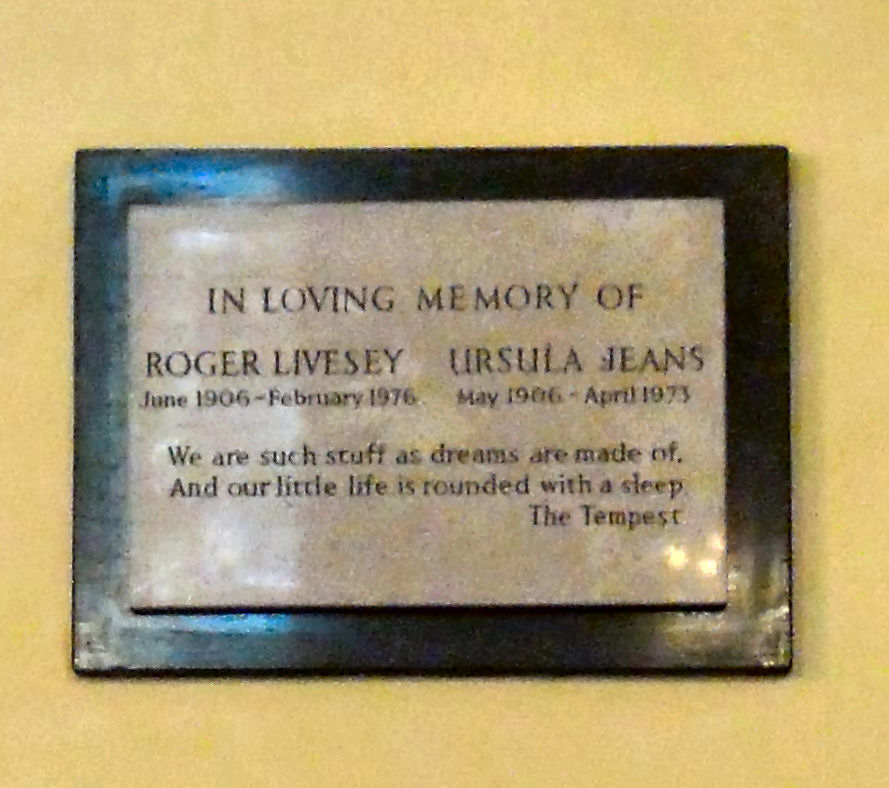
Memorial plaque in St Paul's, Covent Garden to Livesey and his wife Ursula Jeans

Livesey died in Watford from colorectal cancer at the age of 69 on 4 February 1976. He shares a memorial plaque with his wife Ursula Jeans in the actors' church St Paul's in Covent Garden.

== Livesey family ==
Brothers Joseph and Samuel Livesey married, respectively, sisters Margaret Ann Edwards (in 1900) and Mary Catherine Edwards (in 1905). Following the deaths of Joseph in 1911 and Margaret Ann in 1913, Samuel Livesey married Mary Catherine. The four children from both first marriages, in addition to the daughter born in 1915 of the second marriage, were all raised as one large family.

The family tree was further complicated when Roger Livesey married the actress Ursula Jeans, whose brother, Desmond Jeans, was already married to Roger's sister, Maggie.

Many of the family formed a touring company of actors, performing in regional theatres and from the back of an old wagon, one side of which could be dropped to form a stage. This peripatetic lifestyle meant they did not regard themselves as particularly Welsh, or English.

Roger Edwards	Mary David	Thomas Carter Livesey	Mary Wright
Margaret Ann	Sam Livesey	Mary Catherine	Joseph Livesey
Jack Livesey	Barrie Livesey	Stella Livesey	Roger Livesey	Ursula Jeans	Desmond Jeans	Maggie Livesey

== Filmography ==
Year	Title	Role	Notes
1921	The Four Feathers	Harry Faversham	Child role
1921	Where the Rainbow Ends	Cubby the Lion Cub	Uncredited
1923	Married Love	Henry Burrows	
1931	East Lynne on the Western Front	Sandy	
1933	A Cuckoo in the Nest	Alfred	
1933	The Veteran of Waterloo	Sergeant MacDonald	Short film
1934	Blind Justice	Gilbert Jackson	
1934	Lorna Doone	Tom Faggus	
1935	The Price of Wisdom	Peter North	
1935	Midshipman Easy	Captain Wilson	
1936	Rembrandt	Beggar Saul	
1938	The Drum	Capt. Carruthers	
1938	The Rebel Son	Peter Bulba	
1938	Keep Smiling	Bert Wattle	
1940	Spies of the Air	Charles Houghton	
1940	The Girl in the News	Bill Mather	
1943	The Life and Death of Colonel Blimp	Clive Candy	Lead role
1945	I Know Where I'm Going!	Torquil MacNeil	Lead role
1946	A Matter of Life and Death	Doctor Frank Reeves	
1948	Vice Versa	Paul Bultitude / Dick Bultitude	Dual role
1949	That Dangerous Age	Sir Brian Brooke	
1951	Green Grow the Rushes	Capt. Cedric Biddle	
1953	The Master of Ballantrae	Col. Francis Burke	
1956	The Intimate Stranger	Ben Case	
1958	The Stowaway	Major Owens	
1958	It Happened in Broad Daylight	Professor Manz	English version, voice
1960	The League of Gentlemen	Mycroft	
1960	Upgreen – And at Em	–	Short film
1960	The Entertainer	Billy Rice	
1961	By Invitation Only	Phillip Gordon-Davies	TV film
1961	No My Darling Daughter	General Henry Barclay	
1964	Of Human Bondage	Thorpe Athelny	
1965	The Amorous Adventures of Moll Flanders	Drunken Parson	
1968	Oedipus the King	Shepherd	
1969	Hamlet	First Player / Gravedigger	
1970	Futtocks End	The Artist	Short film
1971	Justice	Uncle George	Episode: "To Help an Old School Friend"
1974	The Pallisers	Duke of St Bungay	TV serial

== Vocal work ==
In 1958, he, Judith Furse, Terry-Thomas, Rita Webb, Avril Angers and Miles Malleson, recorded Indian Summer of an Uncle, and Jeeves Takes Charge for the Caedmon Audio record label, (Caedmon Audio TC-1137). It was re-released in stereo in 1964.
