= Anthony Havelock-Allan =

British film producer and baronet (1904–2003)

Sir Anthony Havelock-Allan
- Born: Anthony James Allan Havelock-Allan; 28 February 1904; Darlington, County Durham, England
- Died: 11 January 2003 (aged 98); London, England
- Occupations: British film producer and screenwriter
- Spouses: Valerie Hobson (m. 1939; div. 1952) Sara Ruiz de Villafranca (m. 1979)
- Children: 2 (including Mark)

Sir Anthony James Allan Havelock-Allan, 4th Baronet (28 February 1904 – 11 January 2003) was a British film producer and screenwriter whose credits included This Happy Breed, Blithe Spirit, Great Expectations, Oliver Twist, the 1968 version of Romeo and Juliet and Ryan's Daughter.

== Early life and education ==
Havelock-Allan was born at the family home of Blackwell Grange near Darlington, County Durham. He was the third (but second surviving) son of Allan Havelock-Allan and his first wife, Anne Julia Chaytor, daughter of Sir William Chaytor, 3rd Baronet. His grandfather was the soldier and politician Sir Henry Havelock-Allan, 1st Baronet, who was awarded the Victoria Cross during the Indian Rebellion of 1857. His father's elder brother was Sir Henry Havelock-Allan, 2nd Baronet.

He was educated at Charterhouse and schools in Switzerland.

== Career ==
Before becoming a film producer, Havelock-Allan worked as a stockbroker, jeweller, record company executive and cabaret manager.

In 1935, Havelock-Allan joined the short-lived British and Dominions Imperial Studios, producing films with them like Lancashire Luck (1937) until and even shortly after the studios burnt down in 1936.

Havelock-Allan served as associated producer on the 1942 war film In Which We Serve, which starred Noël Coward, who co-directed the picture with David Lean. The film was shot by cinematographer Ronald Neame, who along with Havelock-Allan and Lean, founded their own company, Cineguild. Cineguild's first production was a film adaptation of Coward's 1939 play This Happy Breed, which was produced by Coward, directed by Lean, and shot by Neame. All three partners — Havelock-Allan, Lean and Neame — collaborated on the script.

The exact same combination of talents created the 1945 film adaptation of Coward's comedy Blithe Spirit. The quartet then produced the classic Brief Encounter, with Havelock-Allan and Neame sharing producing duties with Coward, with Coward helping write the script, an adaption of his 1936 one-act play Still Life. The film won the Palme d'Or at the 1946 Cannes Film Festival while lead Celia Johnson was nominated for an Academy Award for Best Actress in the 1947 awards. In 1999, Brief Encounter came in second in a British Film Institute poll of the top 100 British films.

Havelock-Allan, Lean and Neame moved away from Coward and next filmed two classic by Charles Dickens, creating two classics of British cinema in the process. Both Great Expectations (1946) and Oliver Twist (1948) brought the three Oscar nominations for the Academy Award for Best Adapted Screenplay.

He left Cineguild and founded Constellation Films in 1947. He later co-founded British Home Entertainment with Lord Brabourne in 1960. He later was reunited with David Lean when he produced the great director's penultimate film, Ryan's Daughter (1970).

== Personal life ==
After working with her on This Man in Paris, Havelock-Allan married actress Valerie Hobson on 12 April 1939. They had two sons before divorcing in 1952.

- Simon Anthony Clerveaux Havelock-Allan (1944–2001)
- Sir Mark Havelock-Allan, 5th Baronet (born 4 April 1951).

On 26 June 1979, Havelock-Allan married as his second wife María Teresa Consuelo Sara Ruiz de Villafranca, daughter of Don Carlos Ruiz de Villafranca, the former Spanish Ambassador to Chile and Brazil.

In 1975, he had succeeded to his childless brother's baronetcy and on his own death in 2003, aged 98, his title passed to his surviving son, Mark.

== Honours ==
=== Academy Awards ===
Year	Award	Title of work	Result
1947	Best Writing, Adapted Screenplay	Brief Encounter	Nominated (with David Lean & Ronald Neame)
1948	Best Writing, Adapted Screenplay	Great Expectations	Nominated (with David Lean & Ronald Neame)
1969	Best Motion Picture	Romeo and Juliet	Nominated (with John Brabourne)

=== Hugo Awards ===
Year	Award	Title of work	Result
1946	Best Dramatic Presentation	Blithe Spirit	Nominated (with Noël Coward, David Lean & Ronald Neame)

== Filmography ==
All as producer, unless otherwise stated:

- 1970 Ryan's Daughter
- 1968 Romeo and Juliet
- 1968 Up the Junction
- 1967 The Mikado
- 1965 Othello
- 1962 The Quare Fellow
- 1958 Orders to Kill
- 1954 The Young Lovers
- 1953 Never Take No for an Answer
- 1952 Meet Me Tonight
- 1951 The Small Miracle
- 1950 Shadow of the Eagle
- 1949 The Interrupted Journey
- 1949 The Small Voice
- 1948 Blanche Fury
- 1947 Take My Life
- 1946 Great Expectations – (Executive producer)
- 1945 Brief Encounter – (uncredited)
- 1942 In Which We Serve – (Associate producer)
- 1942 Unpublished Story
- 1941 From the Four Corners (director)
- 1940 This Man in Paris
- 1939 The Lambeth Walk
- 1939 The Silent Battle
- 1938 This Man Is News
- 1938 A Spot of Bother
- 1938 Incident in Shanghai
- 1938 Lightning Conductor
- 1937 Missing, Believed Married
- 1937 Mr. Smith Carries On
- 1937 Night Ride
- 1937 The Fatal Hour
- 1937 Museum Mystery
- 1937 The Cavalier of the Streets
- 1937 Cross My Heart
- 1937 Holiday's End
- 1937 Lancashire Luck
- 1937 The Last Curtain
- 1936 The Scarab Murder Case
- 1936 Show Flat
- 1936 Grand Finale
- 1936 Murder by Rope
- 1936 Pay Box Adventure
- 1936 Two on a Doorstep
- 1936 Wednesday's Luck
- 1936 Love at Sea
- 1936 The Secret Voice
- 1936 House Broken
- 1936 The Belles of St. Clements
- 1936 Ticket of Leave
- 1935 Expert's Opinion
- 1935 Checkmate
- 1935 Lucky Days
- 1935 Cross Currents
- 1935 The Mad Hatters
- 1935 Jubilee Window
- 1935 Once a Thief
- 1935 School for Stars
- 1935 The Village Squire
- 1935 Key to Harmony
- 1935 The Price of Wisdom
- 1935 Gentlemen's Agreement

Baronetage of the United Kingdom
Preceded by Henry Havelock-Allan	Baronet (of Lucknow); 1975–2003	Succeeded by Mark Havelock-Allan
