= Patrick Kirwan =

British screenwriter (1899–1984)

Patrick Kirwan (1899–1984) was a British screenwriter.

== Selected filmography ==
- Riders to the Sea (1936)
- Wings Over Africa (1936)
- Bulldog Drummond at Bay (1937)
- Farewell Again (1937)
- The Drum (1938)
- The Challenge (1938)
- Queer Cargo (1938)
- The Dark Eyes of London (1939)
- On the Night of the Fire (1939)
- The Arsenal Stadium Mystery (1939)
- Bulldog Sees It Through (1940)
- Convoy (1940)
- Ships with Wings (1941)
- The Day Will Dawn (1942)
- Unpublished Story (1942))
- Dear Octopus (1943)
- Escape to Danger (1943)
- The Captive Heart (1946)
- The Turners of Prospect Road (1947)
- Once Upon a Dream (1949)
- The Chiltern Hundreds (1949)
- The Twenty Questions Murder Mystery (1950)
- A Tale of Five Cities (1951)
- Hotel Sahara (1951)
- Top of the Form (1953)
- Desperate Moment (1953)
- The Fake (1953)
- Up to His Neck (1954)
- Jacqueline (1956)
- Dangerous Exile (1957, additional dialogue)
- Rooney (1958)
- Sally's Irish Rogue (1958)
- Broth of a Boy (1959)
- This Other Eden (1959)
- Tommy the Toreador (1959)
- Johnny Nobody (1961)
- The Hellions (1961)
