= The Return of the Scarlet Pimpernel =

1937 film

- DVD cover
- Directed by: Hanns Schwarz
- Written by: Lajos Bíró; Adrian Brunel
- Based on: The Scarlet Pimpernel; 1905 novel by Baroness Emmuska Orczy
- Produced by: Arnold Pressburger; Alexander Korda (executive producer)
- Starring: Barry K. Barnes; Sophie Stewart; Margaretta Scott; James Mason
- Cinematography: Mutz Greenbaum
- Edited by: Philip Charlot
- Music by: Arthur Benjamin
- Production company: London Film Productions
- Distributed by: United Artists
- Release date: 20 October 1937
- Running time: 94 minutes
- Country: United Kingdom
- Language: English
- Box office: £56,569 (UK distributor)

The Return of the Scarlet Pimpernel is a 1937 British film directed by Hanns Schwarz and starring Barry K. Barnes, Sophie Stewart, Margaretta Scott and James Mason. It is a sequel to the 1934 film The Scarlet Pimpernel based on the stories by Baroness Emmuska Orczy.

== Plot ==
In France, the Reign of Terror is in full sway under Robespierre, who sends former allies and friends to the guillotine. Jean Tallien and his lover Theresa Cobarrus fear that Tallien will be taken in one of these purges before the time is right to bring Robespierre down and end the horror. Although Sir Percy Blakeney, the Scarlet Pimpernel, has returned to England, the League of the Scarlet Pimpernel continues to rescue victims of the revolution. Robespierre threatens Chauvelin with execution unless he can snare Blakeney and bring him to justice.

Meanwhile, Blakeney has promised his beloved wife Marguerite, who is expecting their first child, that he will not return to France. Acting as Chauvelin's agent, Cobarrus succeeds in kidnapping Lady Blakeney and brings her to Paris, where she is put on trial and convicted.

Percy and his men rescue Marguerite and De Marre, a former ally of Robespierre. They stop at an inn for supper, and De Marre asks Percy to repeat his famous poem: "They seek him here, They seek him there, Those Frenchies seek him everywhere. Is he in Heaven? Is he in Hell? That demmed elusive Pimpernel!"

Chauvelin interrupts Percy, finishing with the words: “That not-so-elusive Pimpernel!” He entertains the group with his own sequel: “I set a trap. As bait, a belle. His pretty spouse, I grieve to tell. But I never dreamed that I should trap The spouse, the mouse, and the gang as well.” Percy draws a pistol and points it at Chauvelin's heart, but Chauvelin's soldiers, who have surrounded the inn, point their muskets through the windows, targeting Marguerite. Chauvelin agrees to let Marguerite go with Andrew. Percy pulls down the chandelier and he and the gang escape in the dark. Wounded, Andrew comes to the rendezvous with the news that Marguerite is again a prisoner. After long thought, Percy says he is playing his last card.

Robespierre orders Marguerite's execution and warns Chauvelin he is on borrowed time. He gives Chauvelin a list of the next purge of members of the Convention instructions to be sure they are all at the session. After Chauvelin leaves, Robespierre observes to his secretary, de Calmet, that he trusts no one—except de Calmet.

At the league's hiding place, Percy introduces de Calmet as the bravest member of the league. De Calmet brings the list of names and the news that Marguerite is to be executed at noon the next day. "I can save my wife only if I save France," Percy declares.

In disguise, Percy comes to Tallien and Cobarrus and shows Tallien the list. France is tired of assassination and is ready for new leaders. Tallien rushes out to rally supporters, and Percy tells Cobarrus that she is Tallien's courage.

Knowing that Robespierre plans to arrest her, Percy comes to her in an officer's uniform and tells her to write a letter. In the assembly, Robespierre begins to denounce his 20 targets. Cobarrus's note tells Tallien that she has been arrested. It rouses him to denounce Robespierre as “the new Cromwell”. The convention responds with cheers.

Percy appears at the prison to rescue Marguerite, supposedly bearing an order from Robespierre. Chauvelin stops them at the gate. As crowds descend on the prison crying "Down with Robespierre!", Percy claims Chauvelin as his prisoner. On the way home to England, where he hopes to give Chauvelin a new perspective, Percy asks what slow, lingering torture they might inflict on him. Marguerite suggests that Percy teach him to play cricket.

== Cast ==
- Barry K. Barnes as Sir Percy Blakeney / The Scarlet Pimpernel
- Sophie Stewart as Marguerite Blakeney
- Margaretta Scott as Theresa Cobarrus
- James Mason as Jean Tallien
- Francis Lister as Chauvelin
- Anthony Bushell as Sir Andrew Ffoulkes
- Patrick Barr as Lord Hastings
- David Tree as Lord Harry Denning
- John Counsell as Sir John Selton
- Henry Oscar as Maximilien Robespierre
- Hugh Miller as De Calmet, Robespierre's Secretary
- Allan Jeayes as Judge of the Tribunal
- O. B. Clarence as De Marre
- George Merritt as the Chief of Police
- Evelyn Roberts as the Prince Regent, (Prince of Wales)
- Ben Williams as Robespierre's Spy (uncredited)

== Reception ==
Kinematograph Weekly reported the film as a "unsuspected turn up" at the British box office in April 1938.

== Legacy ==
On May 31, 1938, experimental television station W2XBS (now WNBC) in New York City broadcast the film, the first time that a first-run film was shown on American television. However, the staff projectionist played the last reel out of order, ending the film 20 minutes early. After the incident, NBC could not obtain first-run films for many years.
