= You're the Doctor =

- Original trade advertisement poster
- Directed by: Roy Lockwood
- Written by: Guy Beauchamp; H. F. Maltby; Beaufoy Milton
- Produced by: A. George Smith
- Starring: Barry K. Barnes; Googie Withers; Norma Varden
- Cinematography: Geoffrey Faithfull
- Production company: New Georgian
- Distributed by: British Independent Exhibitors' Distributors (UK)
- Release date: 14 October 1938 (UK)
- Running time: 78 minutes
- Country: United Kingdom
- Language: English

You're the Doctor is a 1938 British comedy film directed by Roy Lockwood and starring Barry K. Barnes, Googie Withers and Norma Varden. It was written by Guy Beauchamp, H. F. Maltby and Beaufoy Milton, and concerns a young woman who pretends to be ill to avoid going on a cruise with her parents, which leads to a series of confusions. It was made at Isleworth Studios.

== Preservation status ==
The British Film Institute National Archive holds a collection of ephemera and stills but no film or video materials.

== Plot ==
Helen, daughter of a chemical tycoon, fakes illness to avoid a yachting trip – a ploy by her snobby mother Lady Beatrice to force her into marrying wealthy, idiotoic Reggie Bisset. When job-seeking chemist John Merriden is mistaken for a doctor, Helen coerces him into prescribing her a stay in a nursing home. Suspicious of her daughter, Lady Beatrice begins snooping, prompting Helen to flee to the countryside. Forced to accompany her to avoid charges of impersonating a doctor, John joins Helen in a series of misadventures across local pubs, church halls, and rural retreats.

== Cast ==
- Barry K. Barnes as John Meriden
- Googie Withers as Helen Firmstone
- Norma Varden as Lady Beatrice
- Joan White as Jane
- Gus McNaughton as Kemp
- Paul Blake as Reggie Bissett
- James Harcourt as William Firmstone
- Margaret Yarde as Mrs Taggart
- Aubrey Mallalieu as vicar
- Bruce Seton as Appleby
- Eliot Makeham as Prout

== Critical reception ==
The Monthly Film Bulletin wrote: "The story is entertaining if improbable. The treatment is uneven. After a slow and rather stiff opening the action becomes fast and there are some amusing sequences, notably one in a country inn. On the other hand there are some very weak and would-be funny scenes on board a yacht. The cast is hampered by rather trite dialogue."

Kine Weekly wrote: "Here we have a romantic comedy of happy heritage and easy exuberance. ... At the kick-off the treatment is a little selfconscious, but once the action gets out-of-doors really bright gags roll up in breezy sequence. The director has, apart from somewhat artificially presented yachting excerpts, marshalled fundamentals with a first-rate sense of comedy. The principal players, too, perform with infectious enthusiasm."

TV Guide called the film a "Strained idea cleverly carried off."
