= Edward Lexy =

British actor (1897–1970)

- From 1939 Spotlight casting directory
- Born: 18 February 1897; London, England
- Died: 31 January 1970 (aged 72); Dublin, Ireland
- Other name: Edward Little
- Years active: 1937–1958

Edward Lexy (18 February 1897, in London – 31 January 1970, in Dublin) was a British actor. He was born Edward Little.

== Career ==
He made his London stage début in 1936, and his first film the following year. His film roles were a mixture of substantial supporting parts and minor bit parts. He retired in 1958.

== Selected filmography ==
- Action for Slander (1937) - Minor Role (uncredited)
- Mademoiselle Docteur (1937) - (uncredited)
- Farewell Again (1937) - Sgt. Brough
- Knight Without Armour (1937) - Minor Role (uncredited)
- Smash and Grab (1937) - Inspector McInerney
- Under Secret Orders (1937) - Carr's Orderly
- The Green Cockatoo (1937) - (uncredited)
- South Riding (1938) - Mr. Holly
- The Divorce of Lady X (1938) - Peters - Club Attendant (uncredited)
- Second Best Bed (1938) - Murdock
- The Drum (1938) - Sgt. Major Kernel (uncredited)
- The Terror (1938) - Inspector Dobie
- Kate Plus Ten (1938) - Sergeant
- This Man Is News (1938) - Inspector Hollis
- Sixty Glorious Years (1938) - Dorset Soldier in Crimea (uncredited)
- Sidewalks of London (1938) - Mr. Such
- Night Journey (1938) - Milstone Mike
- Many Tanks Mr. Atkins (1938) - Sgt. Butterworth
- The Outsider (1939)
- The Gang's All Here (1939) - (uncredited)
- Too Dangerous to Live (1939) - Inspector Cardby
- This Man in Paris (1939) - Inspector Holly
- Traitor Spy (1939) - Det. Insp. William Barnard
- Laugh It Off (1940) - Sgt. Maj. Slaughter
- The Proud Valley (1940) - Commissionaire
- The Spider (1940) - Inspector Horridge
- Mrs. Pym of Scotland Yard (1940) - Det.-Inspector Shott
- Convoy (1940) - Merchantman Skipper
- Spare a Copper (1940) - Night Watchman
- Old Bill and Son (1941) - Soldier (uncredited)
- Medal for the General (1944) - Minor Role (uncredited)
- Piccadilly Incident (1946) - (uncredited)
- A Girl in a Million (1946) - Policeman
- School for Secrets (1946) - Sir Desmond Prosser
- Temptation Harbour (1947) - Stationmaster (uncredited)
- Captain Boycott (1947) - Sgt. Dempsey
- While I Live (1947) - Selby
- The Ghosts of Berkeley Square (1947) - Brigadier (uncredited)
- The Mark of Cain (1947) - Lord Rochford
- Blanche Fury (1948) - Col. Jenkins
- Good-Time Girl (1948) - Mr. Morgan
- My Brother's Keeper (1948) - Jess the Station Master (uncredited)
- The Winslow Boy (1948) - 1st. Elderly Member - Smoking Room
- Bonnie Prince Charlie (1948) - Lachlan (uncredited)
- It's Not Cricket (1949) - Brigadier Falcon
- For Them That Trespass (1949) - Second Prison Warden
- Children of Chance (1949) - Doctor
- Golden Arrow (1949) - The Colonel
- The Twenty Questions Murder Mystery (1950) - Det. Insp. Charlton
- Smart Alec (1951) - Inspector Ashley
- Cloudburst (1951) - Cardew
- The Lady with a Lamp (1951)
- Night Was Our Friend (1951) - Arthur Glanville
- The Happy Family (1952) - Alderman
- You're Only Young Twice (1952) - Lord Carshennie
- Miss Robin Hood (1952) - Wilson
- Views on Trial (1954) - Clootie
- The Golden Link (1954) - Maj. Grey
- Orders Are Orders (1954) - Capt. Ledger
- Captain Lightfoot (1955) - Army general (uncredited)
- Where There's a Will (1955) - Mafeking Brewer
- The March Hare (1956) - (uncredited)
- Up in the World (1956) - Detective Superintendent
- The Rising of the Moon (1957) - Quartermaster Sergeant (3rd Episode)
- The Story of Esther Costello (1957) - Fourth Man in Irish Pub (uncredited)
- The Man Who Wouldn't Talk (1958) - Hobbs (final film role)
