= Things Happen at Night =

- Theatrical release poster
- Directed by: Francis Searle
- Written by: St. John Legh Clowes
- Based on: The Poltergeist by Frank Harvey
- Produced by: James A. Carter; St. John Legh Clowes
- Starring: Gordon Harker; Alfred Drayton; Robertson Hare; Garry Marsh
- Cinematography: Leslie Rowson
- Edited by: David Hawkins
- Music by: George Melachrino
- Production company: Tudor-Alliance
- Distributed by: Renown Pictures
- Release date: 3 November 1948 (London)
- Running time: 79 minutes
- Country: United Kingdom
- Language: English
- Budget: £78,000

Things Happen at Night is a 1948 British supernatural comedy horror film directed by Francis Searle and starring Gordon Harker, Alfred Drayton, Robertson Hare and Garry Marsh. It was written by St. John Legh Clowes based on the 1946 stage play The Poltergeist by Frank Harvey. Despite the film's comparatively large budget it ended up being released as a second feature.

In an English country house a poltergeist causes mayhem and ghost-hunters are brought in.

== Plot summary ==
An English country house is plagued by a poltergeist who destroys things in the home, rearranges pictures on the wall, and possesses the daughter of the owner causing her to be expelled from school. A psychic ghost breaker and an insurance agent help the homeowners battle and expel the spirit.

== Cast ==
- Gordon Harker as Joe Harris
- Alfred Drayton as Wilfred Prescott
- Robertson Hare as Vincent Ebury
- Gwynneth Vaughan as Audrey Prescott
- Olga Lindo as Hilda Prescott
- Garry Marsh as Spenser
- Wylie Watson as Watson, the butler
- Joan Young as Mrs. Venning, the cook
- Beatrice Campbell as Joyce Prescott
- Grace Denbigh Russell as Miss Hancock
- Judith Warden as Mrs. Fortescue
- June Elvin as Mabel Minter
- Knox Crichton as Nobby Ebury
- Eric Micklewood as Robert Ebury
- Charles Doe as Bill
- Michael Callin as Mac
- George Bryden as Freddie Simpson
- Marilyn Williams as singer
- Peter Reynolds
- Patricia Owens

== Production ==
It was shot at Twickenham Studios.

== Reception ==
The Monthly Film Bulletin wrote: "This film may possibly achieve some measure of success due entirely to the well-established reputations of its three stars. Although the story has definite possibilities its treatment renders it lamentably un-funny. The pace is too slow, the gags feeble and obvious, whilst the whole production suggests a not very expertly photographed play taking place on the stage, rather than something devised and produced solely for the medium of the screen. Joan Young, as a housekeeper, and Gwyneth Vaughan, as Audrey, act everyone else 'off the stage'."

Kine Weekly wrote: "The first reels are on the slow side, but immediately the co-comedians set to work to lay the ghost, or rather give it a dose of its own medicine, things buck up tremendously."
