= Allan MacKinnon =

British screenwriter (1912–1980)

Allan MacKinnon (1912–1980) was a British screenwriter and also a writer of mystery novels from 1945 to 1965.

== Novels ==
- Nine Days' Murder (1945)
- Money on the Black (1946)
- House of Darkness (1947; reprinted in paperback: 1948, 1982)
- Map of Mistrust (1948)
- Danger by my Side (1950)
- Murder, Repeat Murder (1952)
- Red Winged Angel aka Summons from Baghdad (1958)
- Assignment in Iraq (1960)
- The Boys of Glen Morroch (1961; for young readers)
- Cormorant's Isle (1962)
- Cracksman's Holiday (1962; for young readers)
- Dead on Departure (1964)
- No Wreath for Manuela aka Man Overboard (1965)

== Selected filmography ==
- This Man Is News (1938)
- Let's Be Famous (1939)
- Cheer Boys Cheer (1939)
- This Man in Paris (1940)
- Unpublished Story (1942)
- Sleeping Car to Trieste (1948)
- Vote for Huggett (1949)
- Song of Paris (1952)
- The Saint's Return (1953)
- The Men of Sherwood Forest (1954)
- Behind the Headlines (1956)
- Second Fiddle (1957)
