= Unpublished Story =

- Directed by: Harold French
- Written by: Anatole de Grunwald; Anthony Havelock-Allan; Patrick Kirwan; Allan MacKinnon
- Produced by: Anthony Havelock-Allan
- Starring: Richard Greene; Valerie Hobson
- Cinematography: Bernard Knowles
- Edited by: Vera Campbell
- Music by: Nicholas Brodszky
- Production company: Two Cities Films
- Distributed by: Columbia Pictures
- Release date: 10 August 1942 (UK)
- Running time: 77 minutes
- Country: United Kingdom
- Language: English

Unpublished Story is a 1942 British black-and-white war film directed by Harold French and starring Richard Greene and Valerie Hobson. It was written by Anatole de Grunwald, Anthony Havelock-Allan, Patrick Kirwan and Allan MacKinnon, and produced by Havelock-Allan.

The film served as a propaganda film during World War II. The film has two main plots: the first involves a journalist whose stories are repeatedly censored by the Ministry of Information; the second involves a pacifist organisation, whose members are actually agents of Nazi Germany.

== Plot ==
In May 1940, Bob Randall, a war correspondent with a (fictional) London newspaper, the Gazette, is evacuated with British troops from the beaches of Dunkirk. He writes a hard-hitting story about his experiences, but it is censored by the Ministry of Information. Randall goes to see Lamb, the official responsible, but Lamb will not change his decision.

As London burns in the Blitz and the newspaper struggles to stay in business, Randall writes several more eyewitness articles, and then learns of People For Peace, a pacifist organisation. He suspects that its members are tools of the Nazis and investigates the group. He finds the Gazette's fashion journalist, Carole Bennett, at the group's meeting, also there after a story. Later, following up the story at the group's offices, Randall is surprised to see Lamb there and obviously familiar with the leading members. Afterwards Lamb tells him that he is with British counter-intelligence and that Randall's suspicions are correct, but with the group under official investigation he must drop his coverage of the story.

Trapes, one of the group's members, changes his views after his own home is bombed and sends Bennett a statement denouncing the organisation, but, still suffering from shock, he naively informs his fellow "pacifists". Revealing themselves to be Nazi agents, they force him to contact Bennett in an attempt to retrieve the letter. However, at the rendezvous they are captured after a shoot-out with the authorities. The two reporters think they have a great story, but Lamb makes it clear that the incident must remain unpublished. The closing scene shows Randall and Bennett, now lovers, kissing and posed against the backdrop of war-damaged London.

== Cast ==
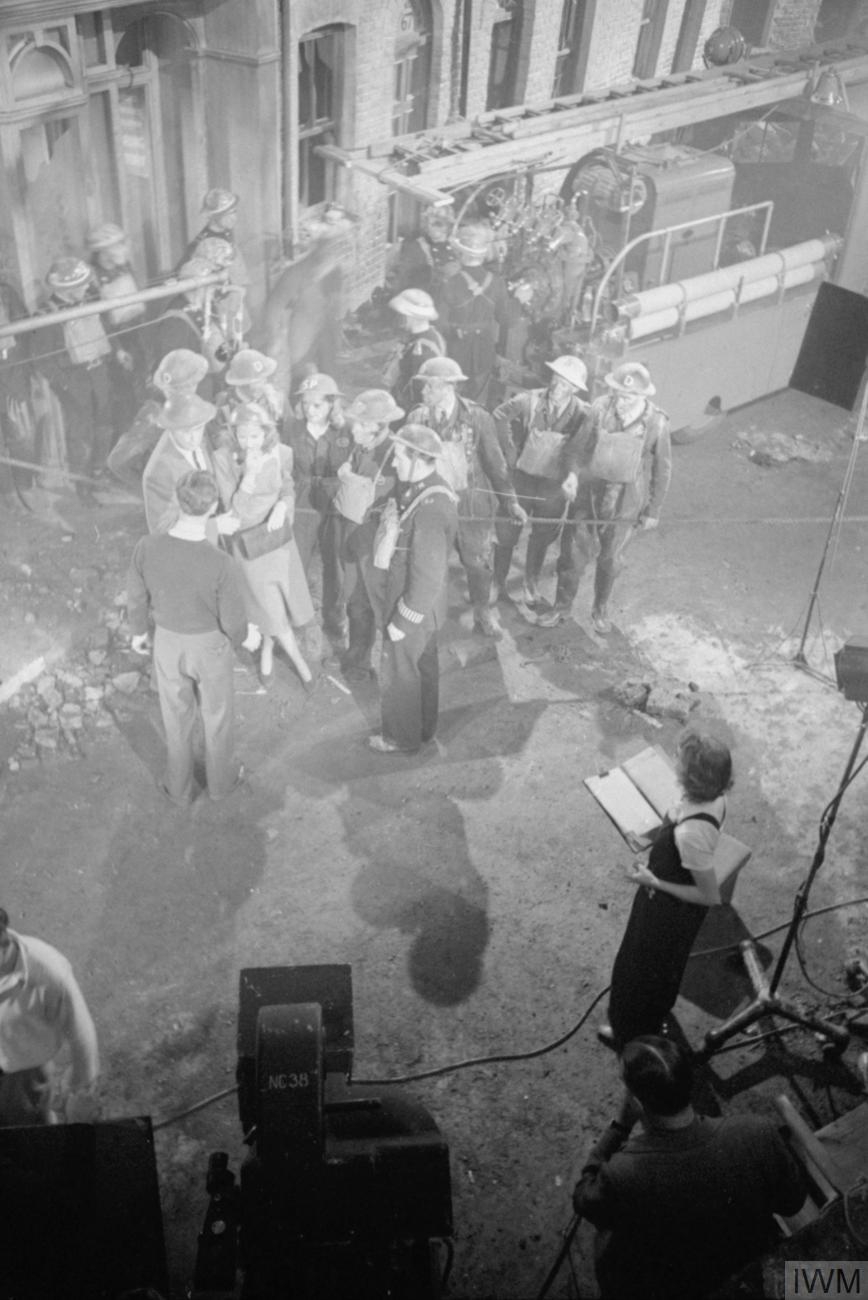
Director Harold French gives final instructions to the actors, including Greene and Hobson, on the set at Denham Film Studios.

- Richard Greene as Bob Randall
- Valerie Hobson as Carol Bennett
- Basil Radford as Lamb
- Roland Culver as Stannard
- Brefni O'Rorke as Denton
- Miles Malleson as Farmfield
- George Carney as landlord
- Muriel George as landlady
- André Morell as Marchand
- Frederick Cooper as Trapes
- George Thorpe as Major Edwards
- Renee Gadd as Miss Hartley
- Claude Bailey as George Roddington
- Ronald Shiner as agitator
- Wally Patch as taxi driver at Victoria Station
- Edie Martin as Mrs Duncan (uncredited)

== Critical reception ==
The Monthly Film Bulletin wrote: "Here is a good story that should have made a first-rate film. The direction and production, however, lack the touch of inspiration necessary for this category. In spite of some good acting and some excellent photography of London alight during a raid, there are some sequences which slow down the tempo unnecessarily and so break the illusion. There is, however, certain good propaganda in the film, and is, except for the hypercritical, entertaining."

Kine Weekly wrote: "Its journalism, although brilliant, is a dis traction, yet the basic theme seldom loses tension. Consummately natural acting, direction and detail contribute to an inspired and timely achievement. The film is in many; ways a masterpiece of restraint and realism. It is also very good popular entertainment."

The Radio Times wrote: "Richard Greene was seconded from the Army to star in this flag-waver, which bears a passing resemblance to Foreign Correspondent ... Diverting rather than involving, this is of primary interest nowadays for its splendid supporting cast."
