= Smash and Grab (1937 film) =

- Directed by: Tim Whelan
- Written by: Ralph Spence (screenplay); Jack Buchanan (scenario); Tim Whelan (story)
- Produced by: Jack Buchanan
- Starring: Jack Buchanan; Elsie Randolph, Arthur Margetson
- Cinematography: Henry Harris
- Edited by: Frederick Wilson
- Music by: Van Phillips (uncredited)
- Production company: Jack Buchanan Productions
- Distributed by: General Film Distributors
- Release date: 20 September 1937; (London) (UK)
- Running time: 73 minutes
- Country: United Kingdom
- Language: English

Smash and Grab (Larceny Street) is a 1937 British comedy crime film directed by Tim Whelan and starring Jack Buchanan, Elsie Randolph, with Arthur Margetson and Anthony Holles. It was written by Ralph Spence, Buchanan and Whelan. The film was shot at Pinewood Studios with sets designed by the art director Douglas Daniels.

It was followed by a sequel in 1939, The Gang's All Here, with Buchanan reprising his role and Googie Withers starring as his wife.

== Plot ==
Private detective John Forrest is hired by an insurance company to hunt down a criminal gang on a spree of smash and grab raids on London jewellers. Together with his wife Alice, he tracks the robbers to a Dublin barbershop that is used for fencing the stolen gems.

== Cast ==
- Jack Buchanan as John Forrest
- Elsie Randolph as Alice Thornby
- Arthur Margetson as Malvern
- Anthony Holles as Polino
- Edmund Willard as Cappellano
- Lawrence Grossmith as Rankin
- Zoe Wynn as Carole
- Edward Lexy as Inspector McInerney
- Nigel Fitzgerald as Cosgrove
- Laurence Hanray as Praskins
- Sara Seegar as Miss Quincey
- David Burns as Bellini
- George Carney as engine driver
- Peter Gawthorne as insurance company chairman
- Edmon Ryan as barman

== Reception ==
The Monthly Film Bulletin wrote: "The comedy of the film is more successful than the thriller sequences. Jack Buchanan and Elsie Randolph in the leading parts make the most of their opportunities; one is only surprised they are given no opportunity to sing and dance."

Kine Weekly wrote: "Here we have marital detective comedy melodrama, the inconsequential treatment of which at times bears a robust relationship to that exploited in The Thin Man. The fact that subtlety is not the film's strong suit results, of course, in loss of piquancy, but what the entertainment Jacks in finesse it gains largely in the gay and ingenious exposition of the obvious. Taken all round it is first-rate mass stuff, generously embellished with star values. ... The dialogue contains many witty lines, the marital detail is delightfully irresponsible, and the production qualities both lavish and spectacular."
