= Bulldog Sees It Through =

1940 British film by Harold Huth

- Spanish poster
- Directed by: Harold Huth
- Written by: Leslie Arliss; Patrick Kirwan; Doreen Montgomery
- Based on: novel Scissors Cut Paper by Gerard Fairlie
- Produced by: Walter C. Mycroft
- Starring: Jack Buchanan; Greta Gynt; Sebastian Shaw; David Hutcheson
- Cinematography: Claude Friese-Greene
- Edited by: Flora Newton
- Music by: Marr Mackie
- Production company: Associated British Picture Corporation
- Distributed by: Pathé Pictures International (UK)
- Release date: 14 September 1940
- Running time: 77 minutes
- Country: United Kingdom
- Language: English

Bulldog Sees it Through is a 1940 British, black-and-white, mystery war film directed by Harold Huth and starring Jack Buchanan, Greta Gynt, Googie Withers, Ronald Shiner and Sebastian Shaw. It was written by Leslie Arliss, Patrick Kirwan and Doreen Montgomery.

== Plot ==
This is not a Bulldog Drummond picture despite the title playing off Jack Buchanan and his previous association with the character. Here he plays the role of test pilot 'Bulldog' Bill Watson. His friend Derek Sinclair is convinced that the new man in his lover's life is collaborating with the Nazis by sabotaging an armaments plant.

== Cast ==
- Jack Buchanan as "Bulldog" Bill Watson
- Greta Gynt as Jane Sinclair
- Googie Withers as Toots
- Sebastian Shaw as Derek Sinclair
- David Hutcheson as Freddie Caryll
- Robert Newton as Watkins
- Arthur Hambling as Inspector Horn
- Wylie Watson as dancing Professor
- Polly Ward as Miss Fortescue
- Ronald Shiner as Pug
- Aubrey Mallalieu as magistrate
- Raymond Huntley as tramp steamer officer

== Critical reception ==
The Monthly Film Bulletin wrote: "This highly topical and actionful story is put over at a good pace, and with more than a spicing of comedy. It works up to a really thrilling climax, while the secret of the identity of the villain is well kept. Jack Buchanan is in his element. He works tremendously hard, and his zest and gaiety are infectious and engaging. He carries the main burden on his shoulders and apparently enjoys it. The other players back him up loyally, and make an effective team. The production qualities are good, and the settings suitably varied and pleasantly familiar."

Kine Weekly wrote: "The picture is described on the Trade show ticket as a smashing melodrama of spies, saboteurs and wreckers on the rampage. Apart from a tendency to overdo the comedy in the opening stages the sponsors' estimation of their product is reasonably correct. As in most espionage comedy melodiamas, the climax is the thing, and in this department the film leaves nothing to chance. The attempt to homb the Houses of Parliament is not only a good thrill but leads to the unexpected. With star and title values to help it over, the film is a cast-iron project for the ninepennies."

The Observer wrote in 1940, "a prophetic but slow-footed war-time thriller, chiefly notable for the first really good impersonation of Lord Haw-Haw."
