= Garry Marsh =

English actor (1902–1981)

- Garry Marsh in 1932
- Born: Leslie March Gerahty; 21 May 1902; St Margarets, Middlesex, England
- Died: 6 March 1981 (aged 78); Richmond upon Thames, Surrey, England
- Years active: 1922–1970
- Spouse(s): Adele Lawson; Muriel Martin-Harvey

Garry Marsh (21 May 1902 – 6 March 1981) was an English stage and film actor.

== Biography ==
Born Leslie March Gerahty on 21 May 1902 in St Margarets, Middlesex, his parents were George and Laura. His elder brothers were the author Digby George Gerahty and the journalist Cecil Gerahty.

Marsh began acting on the stage at the age of fifteen. He started off in films as a leading man but later became a character actor playing self-important roles.

During World War II he served as a Flying Officer in the RAF. In the mid-1950s, he chronicled his wartime adventures in North Africa in the memoir Sand in My Spinach.

Marsh married Adele Lawson in 1920 in Kensington, London. He married for the second time to Muriel Martin-Harvey in 1926 in Chelsea, London before divorcing in 1935.

== Selected filmography ==
- Long Odds (1922) – Pat Malone
- Night Birds (1930) – Archibald Bunny
- The Professional Guest (1931, Short) – Seton Fanshawe
- Uneasy Virtue (1931) – Arthur Tolhurst
- Third Time Lucky (1931) – Capt. Adrian Crowther
- The Eternal Feminine (1931) – Arthur Williams
- Dreyfus (1931) – Maj. Esterhazy
- The Man They Couldn't Arrest (1931) – Delbury
- Stranglehold (1931) – Bruce
- Dr. Josser, K.C. (1931) – Carson
- Keepers of Youth (1931) – Knox
- Postal Orders (1932, Short)
- The Star Reporter (1932, Short) – Mandel
- Stamboul (1932) – Prince Cernuwitz
- After Office Hours (1932) – Brewer
- Number Seventeen (1932) – Sheldrake
- COD (1932) – Peter Craven
- Fires of Fate (1932) – Captain Archer
- The Maid of the Mountains (1932) – Beppo
- Don't Be a Dummy (1932) – Captain Fitzgerald
- A Taxi to Paradise (1933, Short) – George Melhuish
- Forging Ahead (1933) – Honorable Horace Slimminger
- The Lost Chord (1933) – Joseph Mendel
- Falling for You (1933) – Archduke Karl
- That's a Good Girl (1933) – Francis Moray
- The Silver Spoon (1933) – Hon. Roland Stone
- Two Wives for Henry (1933) – Henry Stetson
- The Love Nest (1933) – Hugo
- Ask Beccles (1933) – Eustace Beccles
- Rolling in Money (1934) – Dursingham
- It's a Cop (1934) – James Risden
- Warn London (1934) – Van Der Meer
- Gay Love (1934) – Freddie Milton
- Money Mad (1934) – Rutherford
- The Green Pack (1934) – Tubby Storman
- Josser on the Farm (1934) – Granby
- Widow's Might (1935) – Barry Carrington
- Three Witnesses (1935) – Charles Rowton
- Inside the Room (1935) – Geoffrey Luce
- Mr. What's-His-Name? (1935) – Yates
- Full Circle (1935) – Max Reeves
- Department Store (1935) – Timothy Bradbury
- Night Mail (1935) – Capt. Ronnie Evans
- Death on the Set (1935) – Inspector Burford
- Scrooge (1935) – Belle's Husband
- Charing Cross Road (1935) – Berry
- A Wife or Two (1936) – George Hamilton
- When Knights Were Bold (1936) – Brian Ballymoat
- Debt of Honour (1936) – Bill
- The Amazing Quest of Ernest Bliss (1936) – The Buyer
- The Man in the Mirror (1936) – Tarkington
- All In (1936) – Lilleywhite
- The Vicar of Bray (1937) – Sir Richard Melross
- The Angelus (1937) – Fen Markham
- Intimate Relations (1937) – George Gommery
- Melody and Romance (1937) – Warwick Mortimer
- Leave It to Me (1937) – Sergeant
- It's a Grand Old World (1937) – Stage Manager
- A Romance in Flanders (1937) – Rodd Berry
- Bank Holiday (1938) – 'Follies' Manager
- The Dark Stairway (1938) – Dr. Mortimer
- I See Ice (1938) – Tim Galloway
- The Claydon Treasure Mystery (1938) – Sir George Ilford
- Break the News (1938) – The Producer
- Convict 99 (1938) – Johnson
- It's in the Air (1938) – Commanding Officer Hill
- This Man Is News (1938) – Sergeant Bright
- The Ringer (1938, TV Movie) – Central Det. Insp. Bliss
- Let's Be Famous (1939) – Walton
- Trouble Brewing (1939) – A.G. Brady
- The Four Just Men (1939) – Reporter
- This Man in Paris (1939) – Sergeant Bright
- Old Mother Riley Joins Up (1940) – Dr. Leach
- Return to Yesterday (1940) – Charlie Miller
- Hoots Mon! (1940) – Charlie Thompson
- Let George Do It! (1940) – Mark Mendez
- I'll Be Your Sweetheart (1945) – Wallace
- Dead of Night (1945) – Harry Parker (segment "The Ventriloquist's Dummy")
- Pink String and Sealing Wax (1945) – Joe Bond
- The Rake's Progress (1945) – Sir Hubert Parks
- I See a Dark Stranger (1946) – Capt. Goodhusband
- A Girl in a Million (1946) – General
- While the Sun Shines (1947) – Mr. Jordan
- The Shop at Sly Corner (1947) – Major Elliot
- Frieda (1947) – Beckwith
- Dancing with Crime (1947) – Det. Sgt. Murray
- Just William's Luck (1948) – Mr. Brown
- Daybreak (1948) – Barbershop Customer (uncredited)
- Good-Time Girl (1948) – Mr. Hawkins
- My Brother's Keeper (1948) – Brewster
- Things Happen at Night (1948) – Spenser
- William Comes to Town (1948) – Mr. Brown
- Forbidden (1949) – Jerry Burns
- Badger's Green (1949) – Major Forrester
- Murder at the Windmill (1949) – Detective Inspector
- Paper Orchid (1949) – Johnson
- Miss Pilgrim's Progress (1949) – Mayor
- Someone at the Door (1950) – Kapel
- Something in the City (1950) – Mr. Holley
- Old Mother Riley's Jungle Treasure (1950) – Jim
- Worm's Eye View (1951) – Pop Brownlow
- The Magic Box (1951) – 2nd Company Promoter
- Madame Louise (1951) – Mr. Trout
- The Lost Hours (1952) – Inspector Foster
- The Voice of Merrill (1952) – Inspector Thornton
- Those People Next Door (1953) – Sir Andrew Stevens
- Double Exposure (1954) – Beaumont
- Aunt Clara (1954) – Arthur Cole
- Man of the Moment (1955) – British Delegate
- Johnny, You're Wanted (1956) – Balsamo
- Who Done It? (1956) – Hancock
- Trouble with Eve (1960) – Roland Axbridge
- Upgreen – And at 'Em (1960)
- Ring of Spies (1964) – 1st Member at Lord's (uncredited)
- Where the Bullets Fly (1966) – Major
- Ouch! (1967, Short) – Father
- Arthur! Arthur! (1969) – Golfer
