= The Drum (1938 film) =

1938 film by Zoltan Korda

- Directed by: Zoltan Korda
- Written by: Lajos Biro (adaptation); Arthur Wimperis, Patrick Kirwan; Hugh Gray (scenario)
- Story by: A.E.W. Mason
- Produced by: Alexander Korda
- Starring: Sabu; Raymond Massey; Desmond Tester; Roger Livesey; Valerie Hobson and a cast of 3,000
- Cinematography: Georges Perinal; Osmond Borradaile (Indian location scenes)
- Edited by: Henry Cornelius
- Music by: John Greenwood
- Color process: Technicolor
- Production company: London Films
- Distributed by: United Artists
- Release date: 1 April 1938
- Running time: 104 minutes
- Country: United Kingdom
- Language: English

The Drum (released in the U.S. as Drums) is a 1938 British Technicolor film based on the 1937 novel The Drum by A. E. W. Mason. The film was directed by Zoltan Korda and produced by Alexander Korda. It stars Sabu, Raymond Massey, Valerie Hobson, Roger Livesey and David Tree.

Korda’s company London Films made three films in the 1930s about the British Empire: Sanders of the River (1936), The Drum and The Four Feathers (1939).

== Plot ==
During the British Raj, Captain Carruthers works under cover to track smuggled shipments of arms on the restless Northwest Frontier of India, the modern day Afghanistan-Pakistan border (the Durand Line). He fears a full-scale rebellion is brewing. To forestall this, the British governor signs a treaty with the friendly, peace-loving ruler of Tokot, a key kingdom in the region, which is described as four days' march northward from Peshawar. (Note: In real life the British held a fort at Abazai near this location, not far from the famous Takht Bhai ruins.) Meanwhile, the king's son, Prince Azim, befriends Carruthers and a British drummer boy, Bill Holder, who teaches him how to play the instrument.

However, the king's brother, Prince Ghul, has the king assassinated and usurps the throne; Azim escapes a similar fate thanks to two loyal retainers. They hide in Peshawar, where the British are based. When one of Ghul's men finds and tries to kill the prince, Azim is rescued by Carruthers' wife. Although he is offered sanctuary, Azim declines, believing it to be safer to remain hidden among his own people.

Carruthers is then sent to negotiate with Ghul, who pretends to want to honour the treaty. In reality, Ghul is the mastermind behind the rebellion. He plots to kill Carruthers and his detachment of men on the last day of a festival to signal the start of the revolt. Prince Azim learns of the ambush. When he is unable to convince the governor, he chooses to risk his own life to warn his friends. After Azim leaves for home, the governor receives confirmation of the plot and sends four battalions to the rescue.

Azim manages to warn Carruthers of the impending massacre by playing a warning signal he had learned from Bill on the "Sacred Drum of Tokot", saving many British lives. Ghul is killed in the ensuing battle and Azim is installed as his replacement.

== Cast ==
- Sabu as Prince Azim
- Raymond Massey as Prince Ghul
- Roger Livesey as Captain Carruthers
- Valerie Hobson as Marjorie Carruthers
- David Tree as Lieutenant Escott
- Desmond Tester as Bill Holder
- Francis L. Sullivan as Governor
- Archibald Batty as Major Bond
- Frederick Culley as Dr Murphy
- Amid Taftazani as Mohammed Khan
- Lawrence Baskcomb as Zarullah
- Roy Emerton as Wafadar
- Michael Martin Harvey as Mullah
- Martin Walker as Herrick
- Ronald Adam as Major Gregoff
- Charles Oliver as Rajab
- Julian Mitchell as Sergeant
- Miriam Pieris as Indian dancer

== Production ==
The Scottish regiment featured in this film is a battalion of the Gordon Highlanders, as evident from the cap badge, kilt and headdress. This is true to life, as the Gordon Highlanders were very active on the North-West Frontier during the British Raj, and were, for a time, garrisoned at Fort Jamrud at the mouth of the Khyber Pass. Portions of the film shot in India were filmed in Chitral and the North-West Frontier, and there are scenes very reminiscent of the Khyber Pass. However, some mountain scenes were also filmed in North Wales (Rhinog Fawr Mountain and Harlech).

One sequence shows an Indian Army gun crew unlimbering a mountain battery, a small field piece that was disassembled and transported on the backs of pack animals. Such guns were used frequently on the North-West Frontier, and a mountain battery from the Indian Army also was deployed with the ANZACs at the Gallipoli campaign (1915–1916). Similarly, a muleback radio set is used in the opening skirmish scene. During an early scene with his courtiers, Prince Ghul says that he was an observer at Gallipoli, and that emulation of British training and tactics, not religious enthusiasm, will be the key to his own army's success.

== Reception ==
The film was well received in Britain but caused protests when shown in Bombay and Madras, where it was considered by many to be British propaganda.

Kinematograph Weekly reported the film as a "winner" at the British box office in October 1938.
