= Two for Danger =

1940 film

- Barry K. Barnes as Tony Grigson, and Greta Gynt as Diana
- Directed by: George King
- Written by: Hugh Gray; Brock Williams; Basil Woon
- Produced by: A.M. Salomon
- Starring: Barry K. Barnes; Greta Gynt; Ian McLean
- Cinematography: Basil Emmott
- Music by: Bretton Byrd
- Production company: Warner Brothers
- Distributed by: Warner Brothers
- Release date: 19 October 1940
- Running time: 73 minutes
- Country: United Kingdom
- Language: English
- Budget: £17,202
- Box office: £15,161

Two for Danger is a 1940 British second feature ('B') comedy crime film directed by George King and starring Barry K. Barnes, Greta Gynt and Ian McLean. It was written by Hugh Gray, Brock Williams and Basil Woon.

== Cast ==
- Barry K. Barnes as Tony Grigson
- Greta Gynt as Diana
- Ian McLean as Australian
- Gordon McLeod as German
- Tony Shaw as American
- David Keir as Professor Shaw
- Vera Bogetti as Lady
- Peter Glenville as young Latin
- Peter Gawthorne as assistant commissioner
- George Merritt as Inspector Canway
- Wilfrid Caithness as Meason
- Cecil Parker as Sir Richard
- Kynaston Reeves as Doctor George Frencham
- Henry Oscar as Claude Frencham
- Gus McNaughton as Braithwaite

== Production ==
It was made at Teddington Studios by Warner Brothers.

== Reception ==
The Daily Film Renter wrote: "Though it carries little conviction, there being an air of theatrical unreality about most of the development, there is enough brisk detective work, dead bodies, fake street accidents and Soho snoopings for this production to get by with those who value vim above the verities."

Variety wrote: "Built on the formula of light and sound, this Warner British product comes so near to clicking it's a pity it just misses. Cast works hard and commendably with Brock Williams' original, but script's maintenance of too even a pace throws story effort on to final reel. British audiences would normally be pleased to wait for the ending, but U. S. seaters are likely to become impatient. In latter market, though, it should provide adequate dual support. Lightness is the keynote throughout, but it is unfortunate that more laughs were not sprinkled to give players something to hang it on."
