= Henry Harris (cinematographer) =

English cinematographer

Henry Isador Harris
- Born: 1899; Lambeth, South London
- Died: 1971 (aged 71–72); Midhurst, Sussex
- Occupation: Cinematographer

Henry Isador Harris (1899–1971) was an English cinematographer. He was born in Lambeth, South London, and died in Midhurst, Sussex.

== Selected filmography ==
- Claude Duval (1924)
- Shooting Stars (1927)
- The Runaway Princess (1929)
- No Exit (1930)
- The School for Scandal (1930)
- Almost a Divorce (1931)
- Two White Arms (1932)
- The Wonderful Story (1932)
- Chelsea Life (1933)
- Lord of the Manor (1933)
- Purse Strings (1933)
- The Price of Wisdom (1935)
- Secret of Stamboul (1936)
- The Street Singer (1937)
- Smash and Grab (1937)
- The Sky's the Limit (1938)
- Band Waggon (1940)
- This Man in Paris (1940)
- You Will Remember (1941)
- Up for the Cup (1950)
