= Valerie Hobson =

British actress (1917–1998)

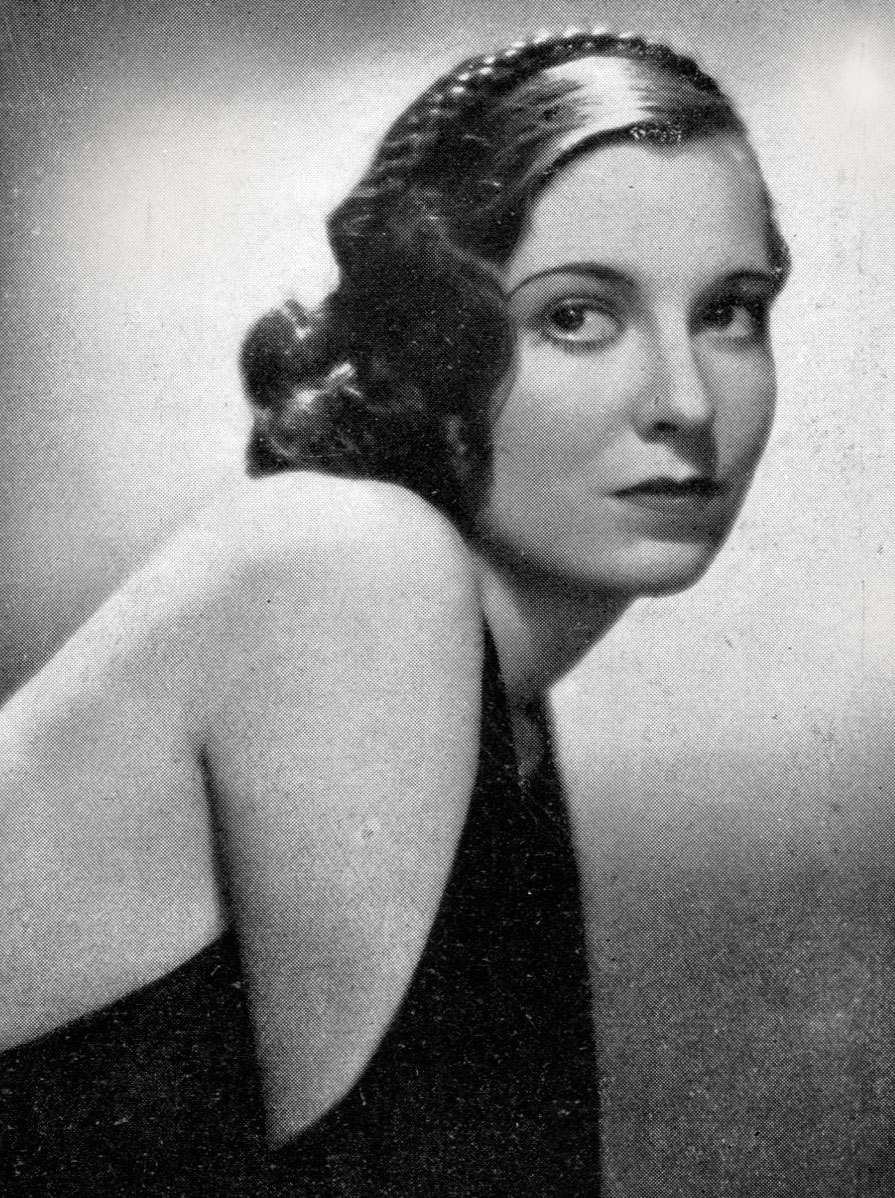
- Hobson in 1934
- Born: Babette Louisa Valerie Hobson; 14 April 1917; Larne, County Antrim, Ireland (now Northern Ireland)
- Died: 13 November 1998 (aged 81); Westminster, London, England
- Years active: 1932–1954
- Spouses: Anthony Havelock-Allan (m. 1939; div. 1952) John Profumo (m. 1954)
- Children: 3, including David Profumo

Babette Louisa Valerie Hobson (14 April 1917 – 13 November 1998) was a British actress whose film career spanned the 1930s to the early 1950s. Her second husband was John Profumo, a British government minister who became the subject of the Profumo affair in 1963.

== Early years ==
Hobson was born at Sandy Bay, Larne, County Antrim, in Ulster, Ireland, to Robert Gordon Hobson, who was a Commander in the Royal Navy, and Violette née Willoughby.

Before she was 11 years old, Hobson had begun to study acting and dancing at the Royal Academy of Dramatic Arts.

== Career ==
In 1935, aged 18, Hobson appeared as Baroness Frankenstein in Bride of Frankenstein with Boris Karloff and Colin Clive. She played opposite Henry Hull that same year in Werewolf of London, the first Hollywood werewolf film. The latter half of the 1940s saw Hobson in perhaps her two most memorable roles: as the adult Estella in David Lean's (1908–1991) adaptation of Great Expectations (1946), and as the refined and virtuous Edith D'Ascoyne in the black comedy Kind Hearts and Coronets (1949).

Hobson's last starring role was in the original London production of Rodgers and Hammerstein's musical play The King and I, which opened at the Theatre Royal, Drury Lane, on 8 October 1953. She played Mrs. Anna Leonowens opposite Herbert Lom's King. The show ran for 926 performances.

== Personal life and death ==
In 1952, Hobson divorced her first husband, film producer Anthony Havelock-Allan. In 1954, she married Brigadier John Profumo, a Member of Parliament (MP), giving up acting shortly afterwards. Profumo was a prominent politician of Italian descent.

After Profumo's ministerial career ended in disgrace in 1963, following revelations he had lied to the House of Commons about his affair with Christine Keeler, Hobson stood by him, and they worked together for charity for the remainder of her life, although she did miss their more public personas.

Hobson's eldest son, Simon Anthony Clerveaux Havelock-Allan, was born in May 1944 with Down's Syndrome, and died in January 1991. Her middle child, Mark Havelock-Allan, was born on 4 April 1951 and became a judge. Her youngest child is the author David Profumo, who wrote Bringing the House Down: A Family Memoir (2006) about the scandal. In it, he writes that his parents told him nothing of the scandal and he learned of it from another boy at school.

Hobson died in 1998, aged 81. After her death, her body was cremated at Mortlake Crematorium in accordance with her wishes. Half of her ashes were interred in the family vault in Hersham, and the rest were scattered on 1 January 1999 by her sons David Profumo and Mark Havelock-Allan, near the family's farm in Scotland.

== In popular culture ==
Hobson was portrayed by Deborah Grant in the film Scandal (1989); by Joanna Riding in Andrew Lloyd Webber's stage musical Stephen Ward the Musical, which opened at the Aldwych Theatre on 19 December 2013; and by Emilia Fox in the BBC miniseries The Trial of Christine Keeler in 2019.

== Filmography ==
- His Lordship (1932) – Last Face in Montage (uncredited)
- For Love of You (1933) – Minor Role (uncredited)
- Eyes of Fate (1933) – Rene
- The Path of Glory (1934) – Maria
- Two Hearts in Waltz Time (1934) – Susie
- Badger's Green (1934) – Molly Butler
- Great Expectations (1934) – Biddy (scenes deleted)
- Strange Wives (1934) – Mauna
- The Man Who Reclaimed His Head (1934) – Mimi – Carnival Girl (uncredited)
- Life Returns (1935) – Mrs. Kendrick
- The Mystery of Edwin Drood (1935) – Helena Landless
- Rendezvous at Midnight (1935) – Sandra Rogers
- Oh, What a Night (1935) – Susan
- Bride of Frankenstein (1935) – Elizabeth
- Werewolf of London (1935) – Lisa Glendon
- Chinatown Squad (1935) – Janet Baker
- The Great Impersonation (1935) – Eleanor Dominey
- August Weekend (1936) – Claire Barry
- The Secret of Stamboul (1936) – Tania
- Tugboat Princess (1936) – Sally
- No Escape (1936) – Laura Anstey
- Jump for Glory (1937) – Glory Howard aka Glory Fane
- The Drum (1938) – Mrs. Carruthers
- This Man Is News (1938) – Pat Drake
- Q Planes (1939) – Kay Hammond
- The Silent Battle (1939) – Draguisha
- This Man in Paris (1939) – Pat Drake
- The Spy in Black (1939) – The School Mistress
- Contraband (1940) – Mrs. Sorensen
- Atlantic Ferry (1941) – Mary Ann Morison
- Unpublished Story (1942) – Carol Bennett
- The Adventures of Tartu (1943, aka Sabotage Agent) – Maruschuka Lanova
- The Years Between (1946) – Diana Wentworth
- Great Expectations (1946, Hobson had acted in the 1934 version in the role of Biddy, but her scenes were cut.) – Estella
- Blanche Fury (1948) – Blanche Fury
- The Small Voice (1948) – Eleanor Byrne
- Kind Hearts and Coronets (1949) – Edith
- Train of Events (1949) – Stella (segment "The Composer")
- The Interrupted Journey (1949) – Carol North
- The Rocking Horse Winner (1950) – Hester Grahame
- The Card (1952) – Countess of Chell
- Who Goes There! (1952) – Alex Cornwall
- Meet Me Tonight (1952) – Stella Cartwright (segment "Ways and Means")
- The Voice of Merrill (1952) – Alycia
- Background (1953) – Barbie Lomax
- Knave of Hearts (1954) – Catherine Ripois
