= This Man in Paris =

- Australian theatrical poster
- Directed by: David MacDonald
- Written by: Roger MacDougall; Allan MacKinnon
- Produced by: Anthony Havelock-Allan
- Starring: Barry K. Barnes; Valerie Hobson; Alastair Sim; Edward Lexy
- Cinematography: Henry Harris
- Edited by: Reginald Beck
- Production company: Pinebrook Films
- Distributed by: Paramount British Pictures
- Release date: July 1939
- Running time: 86 minutes
- Country: United Kingdom
- Language: English

This Man in Paris is a 1939 British comedy mystery film directed by David MacDonald and starring Barry K. Barnes, Valerie Hobson and Alastair Sim. It was written by Roger MacDougall and Allan MacKinnon, and was a sequel to the 1938 film This Man Is News. It was made at Denham Studios.

== Premise ==
A British journalist and his wife travel to France to investigate a counterfeiting ring involving a British aristocrat.

== Cast ==
- Barry K. Barnes as Simon Drake
- Valerie Hobson as Pat Drake
- Alastair Sim as Lochlan Macgregor
- Edward Lexy as Holly
- Garry Marsh as Sergeant Bright
- Max Michel as Emile Beranger
- Mona Goya as Torch Bernal
- Anthony Shaw as General Craysham
- Cyril Chamberlain as Swindon
- Charles Oliver as Gaston
- Paul Sheridan as reception clerk

== Critical reception ==
The Monthly Film Bulletin wrote: "With the same cast whose teamwork is even better than before, an exciting plot is deftly and slickly developed. The atmosphere is lighthearted; the dialogue smart and occasionally witty. Barry Barnes and Valerie Hobson play delightfully together. Beneath their gay and flippant chatter they manage to convey the impression of mutual affection and understanding. Alastair Sim is as harassed and indignant as ever, and his attempts at the French language, as, for example, when wanting an Elysee number he yells down the receiver for 'Eliza', are a joy to listen to."

TV Guide gave the film two out of four stars, and wrote, "this well-done, clever comedy was a follow-up film to This Man is News, a British attempt to duplicate America's Thin Man. However, this second film proved to be the last effort along those lines. Hobson is excellent in her role, though Barnes isn't quite the character he tries to be. Sim provides good comic support in another one of his eccentric specialties. Director MacDonald wins huzzahs for another entertaining middle-bracket crime story."
