= Barry K. Barnes =

English actor (1906–1965)

- Born: Nelson Barry Mackintosh Barnes; 27 December 1906; Chelsea, London, England
- Died: 12 January 1965 (aged 58); London, England
- Resting place: Golders Green Crematorium, London, England
- Occupation: Actor
- Spouse: Diana Churchill (m. 1938)

Barry K. Barnes (27 December 1906 – 12 January 1965) was an English film and stage actor. The son of Horatio Nelson Barnes and Anne Mackintosh Barnes, he was born and died in London. He appeared in sixteen films between 1936 and 1947. He played Sir Percy Blakeney in the 1937 film The Return of the Scarlet Pimpernel. His film career was cut short in 1947 due to an undiagnosable illness contracted during the war. He was married to actress Diana Churchill, and worked with his wife on stage during the 1940s and 1950s, taking West End revivals of The Admirable Crichton and On Approval on profitable tours.

== Career ==
In 1930 he was in The Barretts of Wimpole Street at the Malvern Festival. He accepted an offer to tour Australia with Margaret Rawlings; on the way his ship caught fire in the Red Sea and he spent six days on an island before being rescued.

In Australia he performed Barretts among others.

His other stage appearances included The Late Christopher Bean (1933), Flowers of the Forest (1934), Coincidence (1935) and The Ascent of F6 (1936).

=== Screen career ===
His first film was Dodging the Dole (1936). Barnes leapt to national fame when Alexander Korda signed him to play the title role in Return of the Scarlet Pimpernel (1937).

He followed it with Who Goes Next? (1938) and the well-received "B" film This Man Is News (1938).

He starred in You're the Doctor (1938), The Ware Case (1938), and Prison Without Bars (1939) for Korda.

Barnes did a sequel to This Man Is News, This Man in Paris (1939). For the same director, David MacDonald, he did Spies of the Air (1939), The Midas Touch (1940) and Law and Disorder (1940). For Carol Reed he supported Margaret Lockwood in The Girl in the News (1940). He followed it with Two for Danger (1940).

Barnes served during World War II. He returned to films playing the second male lead (with above-the-title billing) in Bedelia (1946), starring Lockwood. He co-starred with Richard Attenborough in Dancing with Crime (1947). Both films had given him good roles with high billing, and it seemed that his film stardom had survived his six years away from the screen. However, after a small role in Cup-tie Honeymoon (1948), he never made another film.

Barnes appeared in some productions for the BBC in the early 1950s including a couple of plays in the BBC Sunday-Night Theatre (both 1952) and the TV series Silk, Satin, Cotton, Rags (1952).

Barnes died 12 January 1965 (aged 58).

== Selected filmography ==
- Dodging the Dole (1936)
- The Return of the Scarlet Pimpernel (1937)
- This Man Is News (1938)
- You're the Doctor (1938)
- Who Goes Next? (1938)
- The Ware Case (1938)
- Prison Without Bars (1938)
- This Man in Paris (1939)
- The Midas Touch (1940)
- Spies of the Air (1940)
- Law and Disorder (1940)
- The Girl in the News (1940)
- Two for Danger (1940)
- Bedelia (1946)
- Dancing with Crime (1947)
- Cup-tie Honeymoon (1948)

Barnes also appeared on stage as Harry Trench in Widowers' Houses (George Bernard Shaw's first play); as Alexander Mill in Candida (another of Shaw's early works) and as Octavius Barrett in the Barretts of Wimpole Street (by Rudolph Besier) at the Malvern Festival between 18 and 30 August 1930 (Source: Malvern Festival Programme, 1930).
