= Tim Whelan =

American film director, writer and producer (1893–1957)

- Born: November 2, 1893; Cannelton, Indiana, U.S.
- Died: August 12, 1957 (aged 63); Beverly Hills, California, U.S.
- Resting place: Holy Cross Cemetery, Culver City
- Occupations: Film director, writer, and producer
- Years active: 1928–1956
- Spouse(s): Judy King (1921–1926) (divorced); Miriam Seegar (1932–1957) (his death) (2 children)
- Children: 2

Tim Whelan (November 2, 1893 – August 12, 1957) was an American film director, writer, producer and actor, best remembered for his writing credits on Harold Lloyd and Harry Langdon comedies, and for directing mostly British films, such as The Thief of Bagdad (1940).

In Britain he worked with leading production companies including British International Pictures, Gainsborough Pictures and Alexander Korda's London Films. In the United States he was employed by MGM and RKO. He returned to America following the outbreak of the Second World War, but came back to Britain for a film in 1948, This Was a Woman.

He was married to the film actress Miriam Seegar in 1932. Whelan died at his home in Beverly Hills.

== Selected filmography ==
- Safety Last! (1923)
- Why Worry? (1923)
- Girl Shy (1924)
- Hot Water (1924)
- The Freshman (1925)
- Tramp, Tramp, Tramp (1926)
- The Strong Man (1926)
- Exit Smiling (1926)
- My Best Girl (1927)
- Adam's Apple (1928)
- When Knights Were Bold (1929)
- The Fall Guy (1930)
- The Crooked Circle (1932)
- Girl Crazy (1932)
- It's a Boy (1933)
- Aunt Sally (1933)
- The Camels Are Coming (1934)
- The Murder Man (1935)
- The Perfect Gentleman (1935)
- Two's Company (1936)
- Farewell Again (1937)
- Action for Slander (1937)
- Smash and Grab (1937)
- The Mill on the Floss (1937)
- The Divorce of Lady X (1938)
- Sidewalks of London (1938)
- Q Planes (1939)
- The Thief of Bagdad (1940)
- The Mad Doctor (1941)
- International Lady (1941)
- Seven Days' Leave (1942)
- Swing Fever (1943)
- Step Lively (1944)
- This Was a Woman (1948)
- Rage at Dawn (1955)
