= The Girl in the News =

1940 British thriller film

Girl in the News
- Australian theatrical poster
- Directed by: Carol Reed
- Screenplay by: Sidney Gilliat
- Based on: The Girl in the News by Roy Vickers
- Produced by: Edward Black; Maurice Ostrer
- Starring: Margaret Lockwood; Barry K. Barnes; Emlyn Williams
- Cinematography: Otto Kanturek
- Edited by: R. E. Dearing
- Music by: Louis Levy (uncredited); Charles Williams (uncredited)
- Production company: Twentieth Century Productions
- Distributed by: Metro-Goldwyn-Mayer (UK); 20th Century Fox (U.S.)
- Release dates: 28 August 1940 (UK); 31 January 1941 (U.S.)
- Running time: 78 minutes
- Country: United Kingdom
- Language: English

The Girl in the News is a 1940 British thriller film directed by Carol Reed and starring Margaret Lockwood, Barry K. Barnes and Emlyn Williams. It was based on the eponymous novel by Roy Vickers, released the same year.

== Plot ==
Nurse Anne Graham is leaving the service of her bedridden employer Gertrude Blaker, who confesses that she set Anne up by planting a silver ring in her trunk, intending to report the theft. Her malice is aggravated by chronic insomnia; the nurse won't give her sleeping pills on demand. Her contriteness convinces Anne to stay, and she leaves her purse on a bureau in Gertrude's bedroom. When Anne leaves to retrieve her trunk, Gertrude hobbles from her bed to the bureau, taking the key to the medicine cabinet from Anne's purse. She takes a handful of sleeping pills, relocks the cabinet, and returns the key.

On trial, Anne is accused of murdering Gertrude with an overdose of Somenol sleeping tablets for a legacy in Gertrude's will and for “stolen items.” Defense counsel Stephen Farringdon convinces the jury that the evidence was circumstantial, the doctor may be wrong in Gertrude's inability to reach the purse, the legacy to Anne was trifling, and Anne's integrity shone in the witness box. The Jury returned a “not guilty verdict” in 20 minutes. Despite the acquittal, Steve is unsure Anne is innocent.

Unsuccessfully applying for nursing jobs, Anne decides to hide her identity. Anne receives an anonymous letter in the mail with an advertisement for a nurse at Camthorpe House, and she applies using the name Anne Lovell. Anne is hired to care for the wheelchair-using Edward Bentley, whose wife Judith is plotting with her lover, Mr. Tracy, the butler.

Judith Bentley sends Anne to town to pick up her prescription for Somenol sleeping pills. In town, Steve Farringdon encounters Anne and follows her to the chemists, learning she is now “Miss Lovell.” Steve tells her that he now believes she is innocent and makes a date to take her to the theater on Thursday.

In Doctor Threadgrove's presence, Judith Bentley instructs Anne to put the Somenol tablets in her writing desk cabinet. Anne then prepares medicine in a glass for Mr. Bentley. Anne leaves for her date with Steve, and the butler knows she will take the 11:30 train home. At 5:00 the butler sends a maid with a tray for the master, who she discovers dead. Finding a key by Bentley's hand to the sleeping tablets’ cabinet, the doctor finds 15 tablets unaccounted for. Suicide is ruled out when Bentley's wheelchair cannot fit through the doorway where the tablets were kept. Suspicion turns on Anne.

At the theater intermission, Steve goes to get refreshments and encounters his roommate, Bill Mather, a policeman, who is leaving to investigate a murder at Camthorpe where Bentley has been poisoned. Steve is alarmed but does not reveal that he is with Anne. Returning to an unsuspecting Anne, Steve is reassured by her responses and informs her of the murder. He decides to help her with his own investigation.

Interviewing the ticket taker and a taxi driver, Bill learns that Anne was Steve's date. At Camthorpe the maid tells Steve that the butler, nicknamed “Don Juan” by the staff, takes on airs above his station. Steve surmises that the butler attended Anne's trial when the butler recognizes Steve but cannot remember from where. Later, Steve sees Tracy in a photo of Anne's previous trial. Meanwhile, Bill arrives and arrests Anne.

Anne is charged with murder again, with Steve once again defending her. Steve's line of questioning posits that Judith Bentley sent Anne the advertisement and set Anne up with circumstances mimicking the Graham case. To recognize Anne's application, Judith required applicants to send a photograph. Judith denies the accusation.

Tracy testifies that he never heard of the Graham case or recognized Anne and denies being in Alminster for Anne's trial on June 19. Steven points to Fetherwood, a barber, and asks Tracy if Fetherwood shaved him on June 19 in Alminster.

Believing all lost, Judith takes a poison tablet from her purse and makes a sworn statement before dying that Anne was framed. Ann is found “Not Guilty.”

Arrested for murder, Tracy then sees that Fetherwood has gone blind since the first trial. Steven informs Bill smugly that he never had any intention of putting Fetherwood on the stand. He takes Anne's arm, and they go off together.

== Cast ==
- Margaret Lockwood as Anne Graham
- Barry K. Barnes as Stephen Farringdon
- Emlyn Williams as Tracy
- Roger Livesey as Bill Mather
- Margaretta Scott as Judith Bentley
- Wyndham Goldie as Edward Bentley
- Basil Radford as Doctor Threadgrove
- Irene Handl as Gertrude Mary Blaker
- Mervyn Johns as James Fetherwood
- Betty Jardine as Elsie
- Kathleen Harrison as Cook
- Felix Aylmer as Prosecuting Counsel
- Leo Genn as Prosecuting Counsel - First Trial (uncredited)
- Michael Hordern as Assistant Prosecuting Counsel - Second Trial (uncredited)
- Jerry Verno as Charlie - Prisoner In Police Car (uncredited)

== Production ==
The film was based on a bestselling novel by Roy Vickers. It was the first of several collaborations between the director Carol Reed and the writer Sidney Gilliat. Gilliat later recalled:

He [Reed] seemed to be an interpreter rather than a creator; he followed the screenplay quite closely rather than bringing forth original ideas of his own. I felt he was not at all interested in The Girl in the News, which I think was a pallid job. The chief obstacle was Carol's stage background - the couldn't really believe in the screenwriter. He needed close collaboration with a writer.

Gilliat also claimed Reed avoided the "sexual implications" in the script until it "became positively genteel."

The film was originally meant to star Margaret Lockwood and Michael Redgrave, who had just appeared together in The Lady Vanishes. It was one of several films Lockwood made with Reed.

It marks the film debut of Michael Hordern, who has one line, during a court scene, as a junior counsel to the senior counsel played by Felix Aylmer.

== Critical reception ==
On the film's initial release the reviewer for The New York Times wrote, "bring out the smelling salts, folks. Another spellbinding English thriller has come to town!" More recently the Radio Times called the film a "workmanlike if rather transparent murder mystery"; and Allmovie wrote: "this early Carol Reed effort tended to be dismissed or ignored by its director in later interviews. Even so, the film is a worthwhile effort, with an intricate and sometimes amusing script by Sydney Gilliat."

== Radio adaptation ==
The Girl in the News was presented on Philip Morris Playhouse 21 November 1941. The adaptation starred Joan Bennett.
