= The Man in the Mirror (1936 film) =

British comedy film by Maurice Elvey

- Directed by: Maurice Elvey
- Written by: William Garrett (novel); Hugh Mills; F. McGrew Willis
- Produced by: Julius Hagen
- Starring: Edward Everett Horton; Genevieve Tobin; Ursula Jeans; Garry Marsh
- Cinematography: Curt Courant
- Edited by: Ralph Kemplen
- Music by: William Trytel
- Production company: Twickenham Studios
- Distributed by: Wardour Films
- Release date: 15 October 1936
- Running time: 71 minutes
- Country: United Kingdom
- Language: English

The Man in the Mirror is a 1936 British comedy film directed by Maurice Elvey and starring Edward Everett Horton, Genevieve Tobin and Ursula Jeans. It was adapted by F. McGrew Willis from the 1931 novel by William Garrett.

Grand National Pictures released the film in America.

== Preservation status ==
The British Film Institute National Archive holds the film.

== Plot ==
Jeremy Dilke, a withdrawn, mild-mannered man, works in the city. He is preparing an important report on nitrates, but his business partner Tarkington considers him too weak-willed to proceed with the deal. On the Underground train home Veronica Tarkington, his partner's flirtatious wife, contrives to alight at his stop and persuade him to walk her home. Her plot is foiled by Dilke's wife, Helen, who takes him home in a taxi. Jeremy argues with Helen, and Helen leaves the Dilke home.

Alone in the house, he is surprised when his reflection in the mirror steps out and tells him that he is his alter ego, the kind of man he wishes he was. The man-in-the-mirror then begins to live the more confident, aggressive life that Dilke had always dreamed of.

He kisses his wife and treats her with new passion, and flatters his mother-in-law. He also takes command at the office, startling Tarkington into submission.

The real Dilke no longer sees his reflection in any mirror. While the new Dilke stays at home romancing his wife, the real Dilke cannot go home, and is forced to stay in town. The real Dilke checks into a hotel under the name of Thompson, to avoid meeting his alter ego. Veronica spots him and thinks he is open to having an affair under his assumed name.

Tarkington is eager to close his nitrates deal with two visiting potentates. Vengeful against Jeremy, Tarkington schemes to squeeze him out of his share of the business. Dilke sees through the trickery and beats him at his own game. Now successful and happy, and back home, Jeremy and his reflection agree to unite and co-operate.

== Cast ==
- Edward Everett Horton as Jeremy Dilke
- Genevieve Tobin as Helen Dilke
- Ursula Jeans as Veronica Tarkington
- Garry Marsh as Charles Tarkington
- Aubrey Mather as Bogus of Bokhara
- Alastair Sim as the Bogus's interpreter
- Renee Gadd as Miss Blake
- Viola Compton as Mrs Massiter
- Stafford Hillard as Dr Graves
- Felix Aylmer as Earl of Wigan
- Merle Tottenham as Mary
- Syd Crossley as the porter

== Production ==
The film was produced by Julius Hagen, with sets were designed by the art director Andrew Mazzei.

== Reception ==
Kine Weekly said "Psychological in theme, but broadly farcical in interpretation, this comedy of a nit-wit who involuntarily plunges into a Jekyll and Hyde existence and ultimately finds, in the battle between his two personalities, his real self, is as novel as it is laughable. The grand possibilities presented by the ingenious and piquant plot are firmly grasped by the star, producer and cameraman. Edward Everett Horton is marvellous in the lead. Maurice Elvey's direction combines imagination with a superb sense of humour. and the double-exposure photography is brilliant."

Monthly Film Bulletin wrote "The idea is original and well worked out, and clever direction, backed up by thoroughly good acting, makes the most of it. Edward Everett Horton has something of a triumph in the dual role. ... There is plenty of action, and the pace is swift. The settings of office, cabaret, train and hotel are appropriately lavish. The dialogue is crisp and amusing, and the whole is funny without ever being vulgar."

Variety wrote: "Psychological studies in films are not readily assimilated by the multitude, and hence are of little commercial value. Although this is a really fine screen adaption. ... With the aid of a strong supporting cast excellent direction, good production and lighting and double exposure, one sees the timid little Horton constantly confronted by a firm strong. confident replica of himself doing all the enterprising, go-ahead things his spineless personality has failed to achieve. There are many funny situations and Horton does a splendid piece of differentiation in acting. But the whole thing is too much on one key. Proletariat won't understand the story at all but may be content to accept it without stopping to figure it out. Maybe."

The Radio Times Guide to Films gave the film 2/5 stars, writing: "Lugubrious Edward Everett Horton, American master of the double-take, stars in this low-rent British fantasy as a dithering businessman whose looking-glass alter ego takes over his battles in life. Interesting more for the social assumptions of its time than for any cinematic adroitness, it was directed by Maurice Elvey, who made more than 300 unmemorable films in his career."

Leslie Halliwell said: "Modest comedy with a pleasing star."

== Home media ==
The film was released on DVD by Renown Pictures in 2011.
