= Mrs. Pym of Scotland Yard =

- Original lobby card
- Directed by: Fred Elles
- Written by: Nigel Morland
- Starring: Mary Clare: Irene Handl; Anthony Ireland; Edward Lexy; Nigel Patrick
- Production company: Highbury Studios: Hurley Productions
- Distributed by: Grand National Pictures
- Release date: 1939
- Running time: 65 minutes
- Country: United Kingdom
- Language: English

Mrs. Pym of Scotland Yard is a 1939 British comedy-drama film directed by Fred Elles starring Mary Clare in her only title role and Nigel Patrick in his film debut. It is based on the Mrs Pym novels by Nigel Morland, and written by Morland, who re-used the title for a 1946 book.

== Plot ==
Scotland Yard's only female detective Mrs Pym investigates the murders of two people, members of the same psychic club. As well as solving the crimes Mrs Pym has to deal with unhelpful male colleagues and her good-natured but incompetent assistant Inspector Shott.

== Cast ==
- Mary Clare as Mrs Pym
- Edward Lexy as Inspector Shott
- Anthony Ireland as Henry Mencken, a medium
- Irene Handl as Mrs Bell, Mencken's assistant
- Nigel Patrick as Richard Loddon

== Production ==
The film was shot in London at Highbury Studios in July 1939 and released in January 1940.

== Critical reception ==
Monthly Film Bulletin wrote: "The story as ingenious and there is an abundance of thrills. ... Mary Clare is outstandingly good as the heroine. She gets a chance to show what she can do, and takes it with both hands. ... The supporting cast is competent.

Kine Weekly said: "The tale, both in its comedy and its thrills, is a first-rate vehicle for Mary Clare, and she seizes every opportunity. Support is competent and direction snappy."

In British Sound Films David Quinlan wrote: "Ingenious, creepy thriller with first-class role for Mary Clare"

Leslie Halliwell said: "A would-be series character bites the dust through plot malnutrition"
