= Spies of the Air =

- Theatrical poster (Note: the US title on the theatre lobby card was Spies in the Air.]
- Directed by: David MacDonald
- Written by: Bridget Boland; A.R. Rawlinson
- Based on: Official Secret by Jeffrey Dell
- Produced by: John Corfield
- Starring: Barry K. Barnes; Roger Livesey; Felix Aylmer
- Cinematography: Bryan Langley
- Edited by: David Lean
- Music by: Ronnie Munro
- Production company: British National Films
- Distributed by: Associated British Film Distributors (UK); Film Alliance of the United States Inc. (US)
- Release dates: 1 March 1939 (UK) (Note: Spies of the Air has been variously listed in sources as both a 1939 and 1940 release.); 4 June 1940
- Running time: 62 minutes 78 minutes (original UK release runtime)
- Country: United Kingdom
- Language: English
- Budget: £21,277

Spies of the Air (also known as Spies in the Air and The Fifth Column) is a 1939 British adventure film directed by David MacDonald and based on the play Official Secret by Jeffrey Dell. The film stars Barry K. Barnes, Roger Livesey, Basil Radford, Edward Ashley and Felix Aylmer. Spies of the Air involves espionage in the period just before the outbreak of war in Europe that spawned a number of similar propaganda films linking aeronautics and spies. Films in both Great Britain and the United States centred on "... spies and fifth columnists (as) the staple diet of films made during the first year of the war." (Note: Although the foreign power is not named, the implication is that Germany is engaged in stealing the secrets from a British aircraft company.)

== Plot ==
Before the outbreak of the Second World War, British test pilot Peter Thurloe (Barry K. Barnes) is involved in an illicit love affair with his employer's wife, Dorothy Houghton (Joan Marion). He is caught up in an elaborate scheme to steal secrets from Charles Houghton's (Roger Livesey) aviation company. Peter is suspected of betraying his country to a foreign power. Scotland Yard Inspector Colonel Cairns (Felix Aylmer) is aware that the plans of a top-secret aircraft would be of great interest to an enemy.

== Cast ==
- Barry K. Barnes as Peter Thurloe
- Roger Livesey as Charles Houghton
- Felix Aylmer as Colonel Cairns
- Basil Radford as Madison
- Edward Ashley as Stuart
- Santos Casani as Foreigner
- Wallace Douglas as Hooper
- Everley Gregg as Mrs. Madison
- Joan Marion as Dorothy Houghton
- Henry Oscar as Porter
- John Turnbull as Sir Andrew Hamilton

== Official Secret ==
The movie is based on a play by Jeffrey Dell, Official Secret, which premiered in 1938.

== Production ==
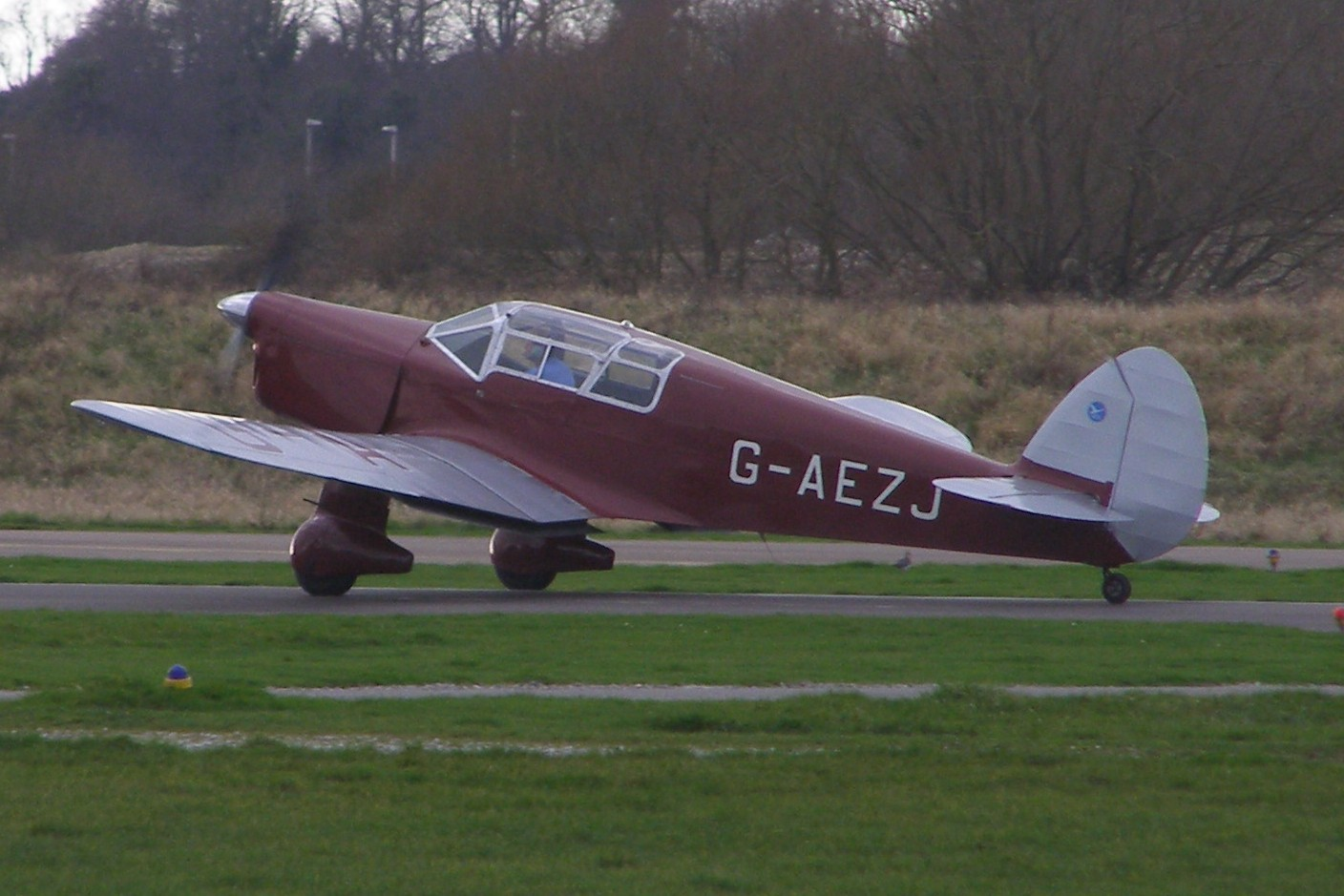
One of the latest British civilian aircraft, a Percival Vega Gull, is prominent in Spies of the Air.

Filming took place at Nettlefold Studios, Walton-on-Thames, Surrey, England, UK. The Air Ministry was interested in the production and allowed the latest Royal Air Force aircraft to be filmed from a commercial aircraft. A Percival Vega Gull (G-AEYC) and Miles M.14A Magister I/Hawk Trainer III (L6908) were featured in the film, as well as a brief glimpse of a de Havilland Dragon Rapide.

== Release ==
Made in 1939 and released in March 1939 in the United Kingdom, by the time Spies of the Air was in widespread release, war had already been declared. For its US release in a much abridged form, the film was originally going to be re-titled as The Fifth Column, but Ernest Hemingway sued the production company, as he felt that the new title infringed on his The Fifth Column and the First Forty-Nine Stories anthology released the previous year. Hemingway won the suit, and the film reverted to its original title, although it also appeared as Spies in the Air.

== Reception ==
Spies of the Air was quickly relegated to "second feature" status, as the release of the similar themed Q Planes (1939), with a much better known cast, overshadowed the more modest production. Hal Erickson wrote, "The flight sequences blend stock footage and newly-shot aerial scenes with acceptable expertise."

After the lawsuit by Hemingway had been settled, Spies in the Air had its US premiere in New York in 1940, and was reviewed by Bosley Crowther of The New York Times: "David MacDonald has purloined a page from the book of Alfred Hitchcock, but without the latter's sense of timing or knack of pointing a climax."

=== Critical reception ===
The Evening Standard called it "well made and better stocked with characters than most espionage dramas. But its humour is forced and it is not as fast as most pictures directed by David MacDonald."

Variety declared "if the demand for aviation spy stories has not been exhausted, this one's surefire here and absorbingly interesting for the U.S." The Toronto Star called it "a grand little film of its type."

== Notes ==
=== Bibliography ===
- Brownlow, Kevin. David Lean: A Biography. New York: St. Martins Press, 1997. ISBN 978-0-31216-810-0.
- Mackenzie, S.P. British War Films, 1939–45. London: Bloomsbury Academic, 2003. ISBN 978-1-85285-258-0.
- Mavis, Paul. The Espionage Filmography: United States Releases, 1898 through 1999. Jefferson, North Carolina: McFarland and Company, 2001. ISBN 978-1-4766-0427-5.
- Warren, Patricia. The British Film Collection 1896-1984. London: Elm Tree Books, 1984. ISBN 0-241-11327-X.
