= Wylie Watson =

Scottish actor (1889–1966)

- Watson in The 39 Steps, 1935
- Born: 6 February 1889; Lanarkshire, Scotland
- Died: 3 May 1966 (aged 77); Australia
- Occupation: Actor
- Years active: 1929–1960
- Spouse: Ada Watson

Wylie Watson (6 February 1889 – 3 May 1966) (born John Wylie Robertson) was a Scottish actor. Among his best-known roles were those of "Mr Memory", an amazing man who commits "50 new facts to his memory every day" in Alfred Hitchcock's film The 39 Steps (1935), and wily storekeeper Joseph Macroon in the Ealing comedy Whisky Galore! (1949). He emigrated to Australia in 1952, and made his final film appearance there in The Sundowners (1960).

== Complete filmography ==
- It's a Great Life (1929) as Bit Role (uncredited)
- For the Love of Mike (1932) as Rev. James
- Leave It to Me (1933) as Rev. Potter
- Hawleys of High Street (1933) as Client
- Road House (1934) as Magician (uncredited)
- The 39 Steps (1935) as Mr. Memory
- The Black Mask (1935) as Jimmie Glass
- Radio Lover (1936) as Joe Morrison
- Please Teacher (1937) as Oswald Clutterbuck
- Why Pick on Me? (1937) as Sam Tippett
- Paradise for Two (1937) as Clarence
- Oh! Letty (1938, TV Movie) as Chester Binney
- Queer Cargo (1938) as Rev. James Travers
- Jamaica Inn (1939) as Salvation Watkins - Sir Humphrey's Gang
- Yes, Madam? (1939) as Albert
- Pack Up Your Troubles (1940) as Eric Sampson
- She Couldn't Say No (1940) as Thrumgood
- Bulldog Sees It Through (1940) as Dancing Professor
- My Wife's Family (1941) as Noah Bagshott
- Danny Boy (1941) as Fiddlestick
- Mr. Proudfoot Shows a Light (1941, Short) as Friend
- From the Four Corners (1942, Short) as Newspaper Vendor (uncredited)
- The Saint Meets the Tiger (1943) as Horace
- The Flemish Farm (1943) as Farmer
- The Lamp Still Burns (1943) as Diabetic Patient
- Tawny Pipit (1944) as Crasker
- Don't Take It to Heart (1944) as Harry Bucket
- Strawberry Roan (1945) as Bill Gurd
- Kiss the Bride Goodbye (1945) as David Dodd
- The World Owes Me a Living (1945) as Conductor
- Waterloo Road (1945) as Tattooist
- Don Chicago (1945) as Peabody
- Waltz Time (1945) as Josef
- Murder in Reverse (1945) as Tailor
- The Trojan Brothers (1946) as Stage Manager
- The Years Between (1946) as Venning
- A Girl in a Million (1946) as Peabody
- Temptation Harbour (1947) as Fred
- Fame Is the Spur (1947) as Pendleton
- Brighton Rock (1948) as Spicer
- My Brother Jonathan (1948) as Bagley
- Tell Her the Truth (1948, TV Movie) as Parkin
- London Belongs to Me (1948) as Mr. Josser
- No Room at the Inn (1948) as Councilor Green
- Things Happen at Night (1948) as Watson, the butler
- The History of Mr. Polly (1949) as Mr. Rusper
- Whisky Galore! (1949) as Joseph Macroon
- Train of Events (1949) (uncredited)
- Your Witness (1950) as Mr. Widgery, Red Lion Proprietor
- Madeleine (1950) as Huggins (uncredited)
- Morning Departure (1950) as Able Seaman Nobby Clark
- Shadow of the Past (1950) as Caretaker
- The Magnet (1950) as Pickering
- Happy Go Lovely (1951) as Stage Door Keeper
- The Sundowners (1960) as Herb Johnson (final film role)
