= Law and Disorder (1940 film) =

- Opening title
- Directed by: David MacDonald
- Written by: Roger MacDougall
- Produced by: K.C. Alexander
- Starring: Alastair Sim; Diana Churchill; Barry K. Barnes
- Cinematography: Ernest Palmer
- Edited by: Douglas Myers
- Music by: Francis Chagrin
- Production company: British Consolidated
- Distributed by: Adelphi Films
- Release date: 7 June 1940 (UK)
- Running time: 74 minutes
- Country: United Kingdom
- Language: English

Law and Disorder is a 1940 British second feature ('B') comedy crime film directed by David MacDonald and starring Alastair Sim, Diana Churchill and Barry K. Barnes. It was written by Roger MacDougall.

== Plot ==
A young solicitor who defends a number of petty criminals is accused of sabotage.

== Cast ==
- Alastair Sim as Samuel Blight
- Diana Churchill as Janet Preston
- Barry K. Barnes as Larry Preston
- Edward Chapman as Inspector Bray
- Austin Trevor as Heinreks
- Ruby Miller as Mrs Honeycombe
- Leo Genn as enemy agent
- Geoffrey Sumner as Detective Delacroix
- Glen Alyn as enemy agent
- Torin Thatcher as Karl Bergsen
- Carl Jaffe as enemy agent
- Cyril Smith as barber

== Production ==
The film was made at Highbury Studios, with sets designed by art director James A. Carter.

== Release ==
The film premiered at Gaumont Haymarket in London on 7 June 1940.

== Critical reception ==
The Monthly Film Bulletin wrote: "This story is eventful enough, but its development is rather held up by clowning and wisecracking flippancies between husband and wife in 'Thin Man' tradition, and by sequences of lugubrious Scottish humour put over in characteristic fashion by Alastair Sim. Barry K. Barnes strolls pleasantly through the type of part he has played frequently before; Alastair Sim also has a made-to-measure part. Diana Churchill makes a lively heroine with plenty of energy and a sense of fun. The settings are varied and appropriate."

Kine Weekly wrote: "Comicalities frequently get under the feet of the basic plot but although the journey to the thrilling, if inevitable climax is sometimes impeded, the film as a whole represents sound mass and industrial entertainment. Its triumph over self-imposed obstacles can be attributed to the personality and resource of its cast. Star and title values are more than obvious –they're compelling."

Picturegoer wrote: "It provides fair entertainment of a rather obvious and ingenuous order. Barry K. Barnes makes the most of the part of a solicitor who successfully defends some crooks but who, actually, is trying to round them up by gaining their confidence. .... Alastair Sim dispenses pawky Scottish humour very effectively. ... and Edward Chapman is true to type as a police inspector. Austin Trevor is well, cast as the chief spy."

TV Guide rated the film 2 out of 4 stars, writing that "The plot is not much, but the script is packed with wisecracks and one-liners that give this picture some needed pizazz. Enjoyable on its own level."
