= List of films cut over the director's opposition =

Following is a list of films cut over the director's opposition. At times, a movie studio will cut a film, usually to give it a more upbeat ending or to shorten it.

== 20th century ==
Year	Film	Director	Notes
1924	Greed	Erich von Stroheim	Von Stroheim made an extremely long 42-reel (over 9 hours at 20 frames per second) rough cut. Under pressure, he shortened it to 24, with the intention of showing it over two nights. Goldwyn producers were still dissatisfied, so von Stroheim sent the film to his friend and fellow director, Rex Ingram, who turned it over to his editor, Grant Whytock. After many more cuts, Whytock quit. New editor Joseph Farnham got the job and cut it even further to 10 reels. Von Stroheim said that the movie "was cut by a hack with nothing on his mind but his hat" and disowned the film as edited by the studio.
1925	The Phantom of the Opera	Rupert Julian	After its initial preview was poorly received, Universal was advised by Lon Chaney and others to order a reshoot of most of the film. Julian refused to comply, and left. Edward Sedgwick directed the reshoot, and the film was re-edited twice before being released.
1928	The Passion of Joan of Arc	Carl Theodor Dreyer	Several cuts were ordered by the Archbishop of Paris and government censors, angering Dreyer.
1937	The Road Back	James Whale	Universal, threatened with a boycott of their movies by the Nazi German government, reshot and reedited the film extensively to tone down its anti-Nazi sentiment and added more comedy. Whale was disgusted at how the studio had caved in to political pressure and left after completing Wives Under Suspicion.
1942	The Magnificent Ambersons	Orson Welles	Welles lost control of the editing while he was in Brazil shooting a documentary for RKO and the Office of the Coordinator of Inter-American Affairs, and he had conceded his original contractual right to the final cut in negotiations with the studio. More than an hour of footage was removed from Welles's rough cut by RKO, which also shot and substituted a happier ending. Welles's extensive notes for how he wished the film to be cut have survived, but the excised footage was destroyed by the studio. A print of the original rough cut sent to Welles in Brazil has yet to be found and is generally considered to be lost, along with the prints from the previews.
1951	The Red Badge of Courage	John Huston	MGM cut 51 minutes from the film and added narration over Huston's protests following poor audience test screenings. Huston said that his original version was "the best film I ever made". The scenes that were cut were grim, intense sequences of war and its effects; some were based on Huston's own war experiences, which he documented in The Battle of San Pietro and Let There Be Light. The studio also feared that the audience would be reminded of the Korean War. It is believed that the cut footage was lost in the 1965 MGM vault fire.
1952	The King and the Mockingbird (original version)	Paul Grimault	Producer André Sarrut took the film from Grimault's possession while he was still working on it, and released a hastily finished 62-minute version, causing a rift between partners. Grimault eventually regained possession of the film, and released his own intended cut in 1980 as per his and writer Jacques Prévert's wishes.
1958	Touch of Evil	Orson Welles	Welles was hired to direct and star, as well as re-write the script. During post-production, Welles was forced off the film. Universal-International revised the film's editing style to be more conventional and ordered re-shoots to be made. In response to the new version, Welles wrote a 58-page memo to the studio in which he elaborately outlined his creative vision for the film and asked that his version be restored. In 1998, producer Rick Schmidlin engaged Walter Murch to edit the restoration of the film based on the memo, and it is now widely regarded as one of Welles's best motion pictures and one of the best classic-era noir films.
1962	Merrill's Marauders	Samuel Fuller	Fuller's original cut featured the battle at the Shaduzup railyard, done in one sweeping take that included American soldiers being accidentally killed by their own men. Producer Milton Sperling convinced Jack Warner the scene was "too artistic". An ending showing Brigadier Merrill regaining consciousness at the Myitkyina operational airfield to be told of his men's casualties. That sequence was deemed too negative and was replaced with a scene of modern 101st Airborne Division soldiers on parade.
1965	Major Dundee	Sam Peckinpah	Peckinpah's original cut, which may have been more than four and a half hours long, was edited to 136 minutes before its premiere. A score that Peckinpah greatly disliked was also added. Following the movie's extremely negative reception, it was cut further, despite the protests of Peckinpah and producer Jerry Bresler, to 123 minutes.
1970	The Private Life of Sherlock Holmes	Billy Wilder	The original cut of the film ran three hours and 20 minutes, but United Artists objected to releasing a film of such a long length starring no-name actors and cut more than an hour from the runtime. Wilder stated he was very upset by these changes, and some of the footage was thought to be lost before being rediscovered.
1971	Wild Rovers	Blake Edwards	Originally intended as a three-hour epic, MGM cut 40 minutes from the film during post-production without Edwards' knowledge or consent. Edwards disowned the finished film and later satirized his battle with the studio in his comedy S.O.B. In 1981, most of the deleted footage was restored for the film's home video release.
1972	1776	Peter H. Hunt	Producer Jack L. Warner bought the film rights to the 1969 stage play and hired most of the original cast and crew, including stage director Peter H. Hunt for the film adaptation. Believing his final cut of approximately 170 minutes to be locked shortly before the film's premiere, Hunt went on vacation. When he returned, he discovered that Warner had re-cut the picture to 141 minutes, including the removal of the song "Cool, Cool Considerate Men", allegedly at the request of Warner's friend President Richard Nixon, due to the song's negative portrayal of conservatives. Warner ordered the cut footage to be destroyed, but the film's editor saved it. The original negative elements were found in the late 1990s, and the footage and song were restored in DVD and Blu-Ray releases.
1973	Pat Garrett and Billy the Kid	Sam Peckinpah	The first cut of the film ran at 165 minutes, but due to objections by Metro-Goldwyn-Mayer President James Aubrey, the film was edited down to 124 minutes over a period of 3 weeks, with Peckinpah clashing with Aubrey over content the latter wanted removed.
1979	Caligula	Tinto Brass	Brass started editing the film but was not allowed to continue after he had edited approximately its first hour. His rough cut was discarded and the film was edited by several editors, changing its tone and structure significantly by removing and re-arranging many scenes, using different takes, a slower editing style and music other than Brass intended, including incorporating unsimulated sex scenes shot by producer Bob Guccione, which Brass had refused to film (his original cut only included simulated sex). Brass intended Caligula to be a satirical historical drama about absolute power corrupting Roman emperor Caligula, while Guccione's edits transformed it into an erotic film.
1979	1941	Steven Spielberg	After test screenings and a two-and-a-half-hour preview, Universal Pictures and Columbia Pictures felt they were too long to be a blockbuster and edited the film to two hours, against the wishes of director Steven Spielberg.
1983	The Keep	Michael Mann	Mann's original cut of The Keep ran 210 minutes (three and a half hours) in length, but was truncated at the demand of Paramount Pictures to approximately 120 minutes (two hours). Test screenings of the two-hour cut were not favorable so Paramount further cut the film down to 96 minutes, against Mann's wishes.
1984	Once Upon a Time in America	Sergio Leone	Leone had already cut his original 269-minute version down to 229 minutes to appease distributors but for its American release, it was cut to 139 minutes against Leone's wishes by The Ladd Company after "disastrous test screenings". It was Leone's last film.
1984	Dune	David Lynch	David Lynch's rough cut of Dune without post-production effects ran over four hours long, but Lynch's intended cut of the film (as reflected in the seventh and final draft of the script) was almost three hours long. Universal and the film's financiers wanted a two-hour cut of the film. Lynch and Raffaella De Laurentiis had to cut numerous scenes, filmed new scenes that simplified or concentrated plot elements, voice-over narrations and a new introduction by Virginia Madsen. Upon its release Lynch disowned the final film, stating that pressure from both producers and financiers restrained his artistic control and denied him final cut privilege. He replaced his name with pseudonyms on certain cuts of the film.
1985	Brazil	Terry Gilliam	Universal Pictures chairman Sid Sheinberg insisted on dramatically re-editing the film to give it a happy ending and make it shorter, a decision that Gilliam resisted vigorously. Though Gilliam's 142-minute version was shown everywhere else by 20th Century Fox, there was no sign of it being released in the United States, prompting him to take out a full-page advertisement in Variety which said simply: Dear Sid Sheinberg; When are you going to release my film, "BRAZIL"? Terry Gilliam Eventually, Universal released a modified 132-minute version supervised by Gilliam. Sheinberg's 94-minute version was televised. Both U.S. versions and a full-length version are available on home media.
1990	Rocky V	John G. Avildsen	The ending was reshot.
1990	Nightbreed	Clive Barker	Adapted by Clive Barker from his novella Cabal, Nightbreed underwent significant reshoots and editing after a change in leadership at the production company, Morgan Creek Entertainment, leading to Barker effectively disowning the final product; an estimated 40 minutes was removed from the film and was considered lost. After a VHS tape containing the workprint of the film was found and screened in 2009, the original footage was located and a director's cut featuring the lost footage was assembled and released in 2014.
1992	Alien 3	David Fincher	After a troubled production and difficult shooting schedule, 20th Century Fox ordered David Fincher to replace the ending following a negative test screening, forcing the director to make a cut that he did not agree with. Further demands led to Fincher quitting production, and the film was partially reshot without Fincher's involvement. A version of the film closer to Fincher's intended vision but without his involvement was released in 2003.
1993	Army of Darkness	Sam Raimi	The ending was reshot due to Universal Pictures feeling it was too negative.
1993	The Thief and the Cobbler	Richard Williams	Following a nearly three-decade production, creator/director Richard Williams was forced off the project in the early 1990s with the film heavily re-edited in a hasty, cheap manner by Fred Calvert, with several Disney-style musical numbers added. It was released under the title The Princess and the Cobbler and later licensed by Miramax for release in the United States as Arabian Knight. Some fan-made edits of the film, including Garrett Gilchrist's The Thief and the Cobbler: The Recobbled Cut, have attempted to stay true to Williams's original intended vision.
1994	Color of Night	Richard Rush	Richard Rush's version of the film was only released on home video, with Rush stating that the theatrical cut of the film commissioned by Cinergi executive Andy Vajna had "shortened and juggled scenes." The film was considered noteworthy for the difference between the theatrical and video versions reflecting a creative dispute rather than a film being cut down to secure an acceptable rating by the MPA.
1997	Event Horizon	Paul W. S. Anderson	When the original 130-minute cut was poorly received by test audiences, including complaints about the extreme amount of gore and members of the test audience allegedly fainting, Paramount demanded a shorter length time with less gore, forcing the director Anderson to make a significantly shortened cut of the film. The approximately 40 minutes of removed footage was improperly stored and accidentally destroyed, and only fragments of the lost footage have been located.
1998	American History X	Tony Kaye	The final cut of the film, which lead actor Edward Norton was involved in, ran 40 minutes longer than Kaye's initial 95 minute cut, leading to Kaye disowning the film. He also attempted to be credited as "Humpty Dumpty" in the theatrical version by New Line Cinema, but this was denied by the Directors Guild of America.
1999	The 13th Warrior	John McTiernan	The film was reported to have been reshot and re-edited by Michael Crichton, who wrote the novel the film was based on, taking over from John McTiernan.
2000	Book of Shadows: Blair Witch 2	Joe Berlinger	In contrast to the first Blair Witch, Berlinger had conceived the sequel with more of an ambiguous tone that focused on the characters' psychological unraveling. Artisan forced him to cut and reshoot certain scenes in favor of more "traditional horror". Most notably, footage of the main characters murdering the foreign tourists, which was added weeks before release. An interrogation scene, which was originally shot as a continuous 8-minute sequence, was cut up and spliced throughout the film. Additionally, Frank Sinatra's "Witchcraft" was originally set to play during the opening credits, but was replaced by the studio with "Disposable Teens" by Marilyn Manson. Berlinger has since stated the changes made to the film compromised his linear narrative and the ambiguity he tried hard to nurture.

== 21st century ==
Year	Film	Director	Notes
2002	Gangs of New York	Martin Scorsese	The production was done by 2001, but delayed for over a year due to the September 11 attacks. Studio executive Harvey Weinstein demanded that Scorsese make edits to the original print, and Scorsese ultimately relented, cutting out about 20 minutes of footage. There are no plans to release a "director's cut" of the film; editor Thelma Schoonmaker stated that, "Marty doesn't believe in that. He believes in showing only the finished film." Scorsese has doubled down on this, saying that "there won't be any director's cut — because this is the director's cut."
2005	Æon Flux	Karyn Kusama	Following the departure of Sherry Lansing from Paramount Pictures, new chiefs Brad Grey Gail Berman felt the film was "a $50 million art movie" and removed Karyn Kusama's control over the film. The film was then edited down to 71 minutes, which the executives also didn't like and allowed Kusama to come back to the project, but was not allowed to be alone with the editor.
2007	The Golden Compass	Chris Weitz	According to director Chris Weitz, New Line Cinema removed 30 minutes of footage from the original cut and removed elements from the Philip Pullman novels the film was based on in order to avoid offending audiences.
2015	Fantastic Four	Josh Trank	Unsatisfied with Trank's original cut which they stated felt like a sequel to Chronicle, 20th Century Fox mandated reshoots which included a different ending and the alteration of Doom's character among other things. Josh Trank has expressed his displeasure with the theatrical cut, which he attributes to the interference from the studio. In a now deleted tweet, Trank stated that his version of the film would have received great reviews.
2016	Suicide Squad	David Ayer	Many scenes were cut and altered from the film by Warner Bros., despite Ayer's opposition.

== See also ==
- Alan Smithee, an official pseudonym used when a director wishes to disassociate themselves from a project
- Lost Horizon (1937). Director Frank Capra made extensive cuts after poor preview audience reactions, but that was not enough for studio head Harry Cohn, who personally made further cuts.
