= Two Fathers =

Two Fathers may refer to:

- "Two Fathers" (The X-Files), a 1999 episode of the television series The X-Files
- Two Fathers (TV series), a 2013 Taiwanese television series
- Two Fathers (film), a 1944 British wartime propaganda short film
- Two Fathers: Justice for the Innocent, a 1994 American television crime drama film
