= For Men Only (1952 film) =

1952 American film by Paul Henreid

- Directed by: Paul Henreid
- Screenplay by: Lou Morheim; Herbert Magolis
- Produced by: Paul Henreid; Edward Nassour
- Starring: Paul Henreid; Margaret Field; Kathleen Hughes
- Cinematography: Paul Ivano
- Edited by: Sherman A. Rose
- Music by: Hoyt Curtin
- Production company: H-N Productions
- Distributed by: Lippert Pictures (U.S.); Exclusive Pictures (U.K.)
- Release date: January 15, 1952 (New York)
- Running time: 93 minutes
- Country: United States
- Language: English

For Men Only (also known as The Tall Lie) is a 1952 American film noir directed by Paul Henreid and starring Henreid, Margaret Field and Kathleen Hughes.

== Plot ==
Tough college student Tod Palmer patiently suffers increasingly severe hazing at the hands of sadistic Ky Walker while pledging a fraternity at Wake College. Attempting to bring the ritual initiation abuses to the authorities' attention, Tod accidentally dies after fleeing from the angry fraternity brothers. Medical professor Dr. Stephen Brice tries to end the practice of hazing, determined to obtain justice for one of his best students.

== Cast ==
- Paul Henreid as Dr. Stephen Brice
- Margaret Field as Julie Brice
- James Dobson as Bartholomew "Beanie" Brown
- Kathleen Hughes as Tracy Norman
- Douglas Kennedy as Colin Mayberry
- Robert Carson as Jesse Hopkins
- Virginia Mullen as Mrs. Palmer
- O. Z. Whitehead as Professor Bixby
- Vera Miles as Kathy
- Robert Sherman as Tod Palmer
- Russell Johnson as Ky Walker
- Christian Drake as Jack
- John Eldredge as Mr. St. Claire
- Vernon Rich as Mr. Blaine
- Franklyn Farnum as Regents Board Member
- Norman Leavitt as Motorist

== Production ==
Veteran actor Paul Henreid had directed theater productions, but For Men Only was his first film as a director, although he had produced two earlier films, Hollow Triumph (1948) and So Young, So Bad (1950).

Henreid partnered with producer Edward Nassour to form HN Productions, which produced the film. In March 1951, they arranged financing for the project through Robert L. Lippert. Henreid and Lippert were secretive about the subject matter, describing it as "topical and controversial". Henreid later admitted that the secrecy was intended to prevent rival producers from bringing similar stories to the screen before For Men Only was released.

Filming began on September 5, 1951 at the General Service Studios in Hollywood following one week of rehearsal. Production spanned 16 days and was completed two days ahead of schedule.

Henreid wanted to title the film Hell Night, but Lippert Pictures named it For Men Only.

== Reception ==
In a contemporary review for The New York Times, critic A. H. Weiler wrote: "Mr. Henreid's contribution is not a shattering castigation, nor is it likely to cause sweeping reform, but it may embarrass some Greek letter institutions while entertaining the unlettered in fraternal matters. ... For all of Mr. Henreid's sincerity of purpose, however, 'For Men Only' seems to be jousting against a terribly tiny dragon. advised the dead student's mother The men in college must more pressing problems these days."
