= Last of the Buccaneers =

1950 film by Lew Landers

- Film poster
- Directed by: Lew Landers
- Written by: Robert E. Kent
- Produced by: Sam Katzman
- Starring: Paul Henreid
- Cinematography: Vincent Farrar
- Edited by: Henry Batista
- Production company: SK Pictures
- Distributed by: Columbia Pictures
- Release date: October 25, 1950
- Running time: 79 minutes
- Country: United States
- Language: English

Last of the Buccaneers is a 1950 American Technicolor adventure film directed by Lew Landers and starring Paul Henreid as Jean Lafitte.

== Plot ==
Swashbuckler about the adventures of pirate Jean Lafitte after he helped save New Orleans from a British invasion during the War of 1812.

== Cast ==
- Paul Henreid as Jean Lafitte
- Jack Oakie as Sergeant Dominick
- Karin Booth as Belle Summers
- Mary Anderson as Swallow
- Edgar Barrier as George Mareval
- John Dehner as Sergeant Beluche
- Harry Cording as Cragg Brown
- Eugene Borden as Captain Perez

== Production ==
Henreid's career had suffered since the Red Scare of the late 1940s, which saw him unofficially blacklisted from the major Hollywood studios. He had been making films in New York and France when offered the lead role in Last of the Buccaneers by producer Sam Katzman. It was Henreid's first swashbuckler since the highly successful The Spanish Main (1945). Henreid appeared in the film for a relatively low salary plus a percentage of the profits. Henreid says that because of his blacklisting Columbia Pictures would not hire him but the film was made through an independent company, SK Pictures, he could play the role.

Filming started 14 March 1950. The film's sets were designed by the art director Paul Palmentola.

Hedda Hopper reported that Errol Flynn had written a script called The Last of the Buccaneers in the late 1940s for Flynn to star in but it appears to have no other connection to this film.

== Reception ==
According to Henreid, the film was "a huge success and my percentage brought in an enormous amount of money." He went on to make a number of other swashbucklers for Katzman.
