= Thief of Damascus =

1952 film by John Rawlins

- Theatrical release poster
- Directed by: Will Jason
- Written by: Robert E. Kent
- Produced by: Sam Katzman
- Starring: Paul Henreid; John Sutton; Jeff Donnell
- Cinematography: Ellis W. Carter
- Edited by: William A. Lyon
- Music by: Mischa Bakaleinikoff
- Production company: Sam Katzman Productions
- Distributed by: Columbia Pictures
- Release date: May 7, 1952
- Running time: 78 minutes
- Country: United States
- Language: English

Thief of Damascus is a 1952 American Technicolor adventure film directed by Will Jason and starring Paul Henreid, John Sutton and Jeff Donnell. The film features a generous use of stock footage from such films as Joan of Arc. The film, produced by Sam Katzman, was preceded by his The Magic Carpet and followed by Siren of Bagdad.

== Plot ==
634 A.D.:Though General Amdar is able to win the Siege of Damascus for his ruler Khalid, he is made an enemy of the State. Amdar escapes and steals a scimitar made of Damascus steel. He leads an alliance of Sinbad without his ship, Aladdin without his lamp, Sheherazade, and Ali Baba and his 40 thieves to depose Khalid and win the heart of Princess Zafir.

== Cast ==
As appearing in screen credits (main roles identified):

Actor	Role
Paul Henreid	Abu Amdar
John Sutton	Khalid
Jeff Donnell	Sheherazade
Lon Chaney Jr.	Sinbad
Elena Verdugo	Neela
Helen Gilbert	Princess Zafir
Robert Clary	Aladdin
Edward Colmans	Sultan Raudah
Nelson Leigh	Ben Jammal
Philip Van Zandt	Ali Baba
