= Paul Henreid =

Austrian-American actor and film director (1908–1992)

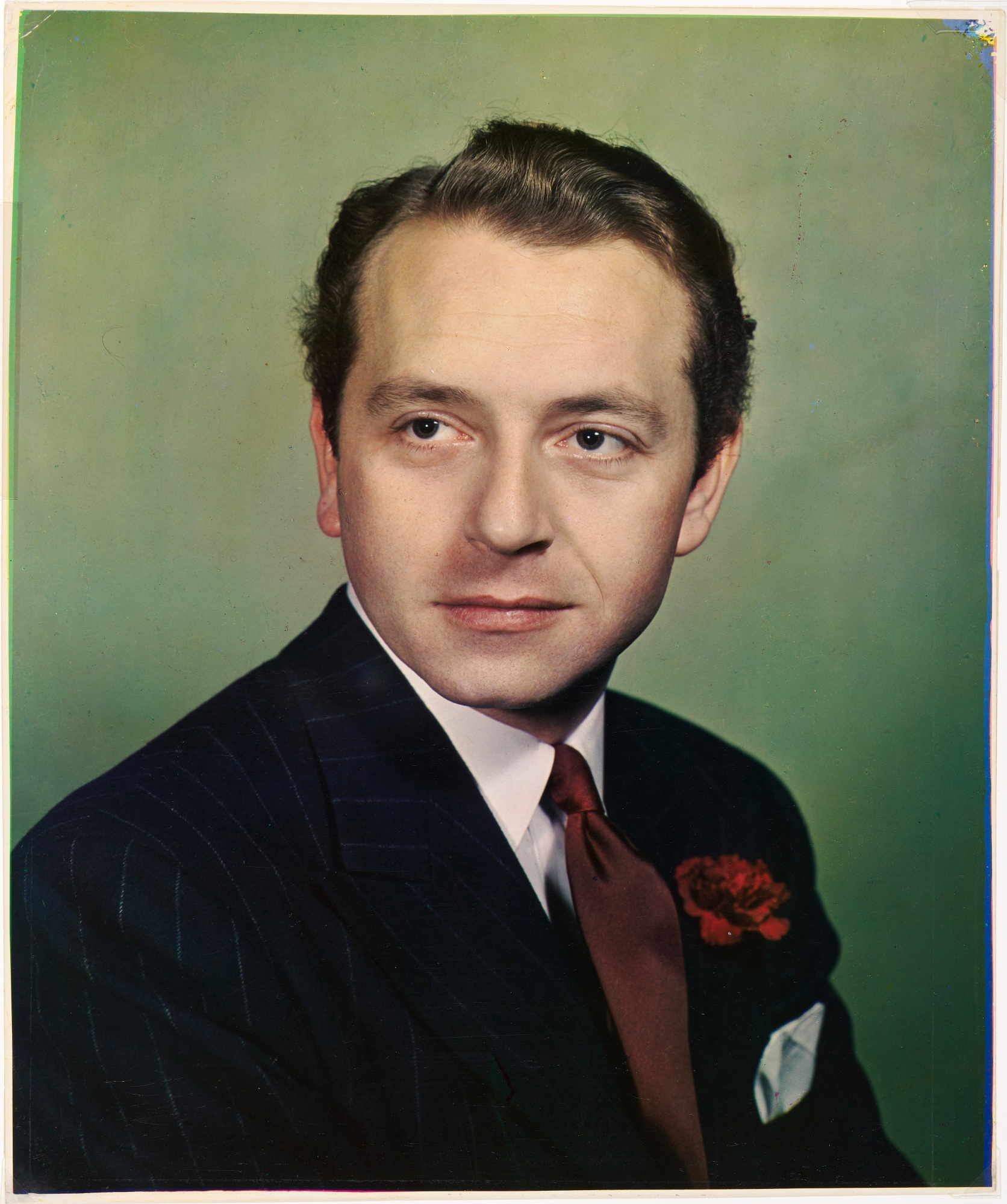
- Portrait of Paul Henreid, 1940
- Born: Paul Georg Julius Freiherr von Hernreid Ritter von Wasel-Waldingau; January 10, 1908; Trieste, Austria-Hungary (present-day Italy)
- Died: March 29, 1992 (aged 84); Santa Monica, California, U.S.
- Citizenship: Austria-Hungary; United States (after 1941); Austria (after 1946)
- Occupations: Actor; director; producer; screenwriter
- Years active: 1933–1977
- Spouse: Elizabeth "Lisl" Camilla Julia Gluck Henreid (m. 1936)
- Children: 2

Paul Georg Julius Freiherr von Hernreid, Ritter von Wasel-Waldingau (January 10, 1908 – March 29, 1992) was an Austrian and American actor and filmmaker. He had a successful stage and film career in German-language productions, before moving to Great Britain and the United States as a refugee from Nazi Germany. Some of his best-known film roles included Capt. Karl Marsen in Night Train to Munich (1940), Victor Laszlo in Casablanca (1942) and Jerry Durrance in Now, Voyager (1942).

After the Second World War, Henreid was blacklisted by the House Committee on Un-American Activities (HUAC) and worked mainly in independent films and in Europe. He eventually returned to Hollywood in 1954.

== Early life and education ==
Paul Henreid was born on January 10, 1908, as Paul Georg Julius Freiherr von Hernreid Ritter von Wasel-Waldingau in Trieste, then part of the Austro-Hungarian Empire. He was the son of Maria-Luise (Lendecke) and Karl Alphons Hernreid, a financial adviser to Emperor Franz Joseph I. Born as Carl Hirsch, Karl von Hernreid converted from Judaism to Catholicism in 1904 due to anti-semitism in Austria-Hungary, although that did not save his son being persecuted as a Jew by the Nazis in the 1930s.

Paul von Henreid trained for the theatre in Vienna, over his family's objections, attending the Theresianische Akademie. During this time, he worked at a publishing house while attending school. Karl died in 1916. The family fortune had dwindled by the time his son graduated from the Akademie.

== Career ==
=== Roles in Germany and Austria ===
While performing in a play at the Akademie, Henreid was discovered by Otto Preminger, then working for the director Max Reinhardt. Henreid then joined Reinhardt's theater company. In 1933, he played a minor role in a stage production of Faust. He had starring roles in the Vienna staging of the 1934 play Men in White and the play Mizzi.

With the onset of the National Socialist regime in Germany in 1933, the NS-Reichsfilmkammer (National Socialistic Reich Film Chamber) controlled the making of German films. He applied for membership, but was rejected because his father had been born a Jew. In 1935, Henreid was cast in the Austrian film Jersey Lilly. Henreid went to London in 1937 to portray Prince Albert in the first British stage production of Victoria Regina. That same year, he applied again for a membership by a special permit with the NS-Reichsfilmkammer. This request was personally rejected by Nazi Propaganda Minister Joseph Goebbels.

By the time Germany took over Austria in 1938, Henreid had become fervently anti-Nazi. During this period, he helped a Jewish comedian flee Germany. As a result of this and other actions, the German Government designated him an "official enemy of the Third Reich" and confiscated all his assets in Germany. Henreid soon moved permanently to the United Kingdom.

=== Roles in the United Kingdom ===
With the outbreak of the Second World War in 1939, Henreid risked deportation from the United Kingdom or internment as an enemy alien. However, the German actor Conrad Veidt vouched for him, and the British Government allowed him to stay and work. Veidt later appeared alongside Henreid as Major Heinrich Strasser in the film Casablanca.

In 1939, Henreid had a major supporting role as German teacher Max Staefel in Goodbye, Mr. Chips. The following year, he received third billing as a German Gestapo agent in the thriller Night Train to Munich. In 1940, Henreid also performed in a minor role in the British musical comedy Under Your Hat. That same year, he portrayed a German army officer in the film Madman of Europe.

=== Roles for RKO, Warner Bros., and MGM ===
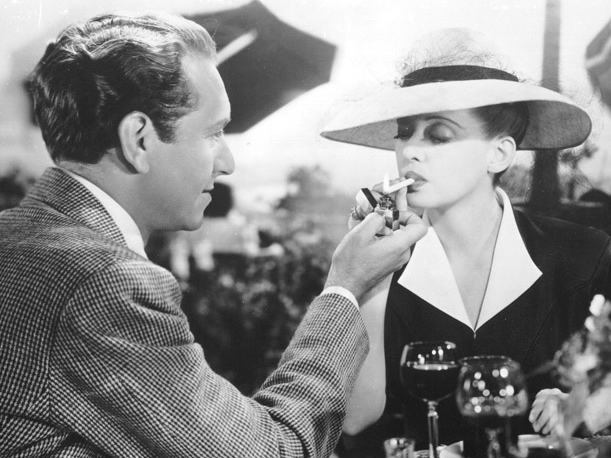
Paul Henreid and Bette Davis, Now, Voyager

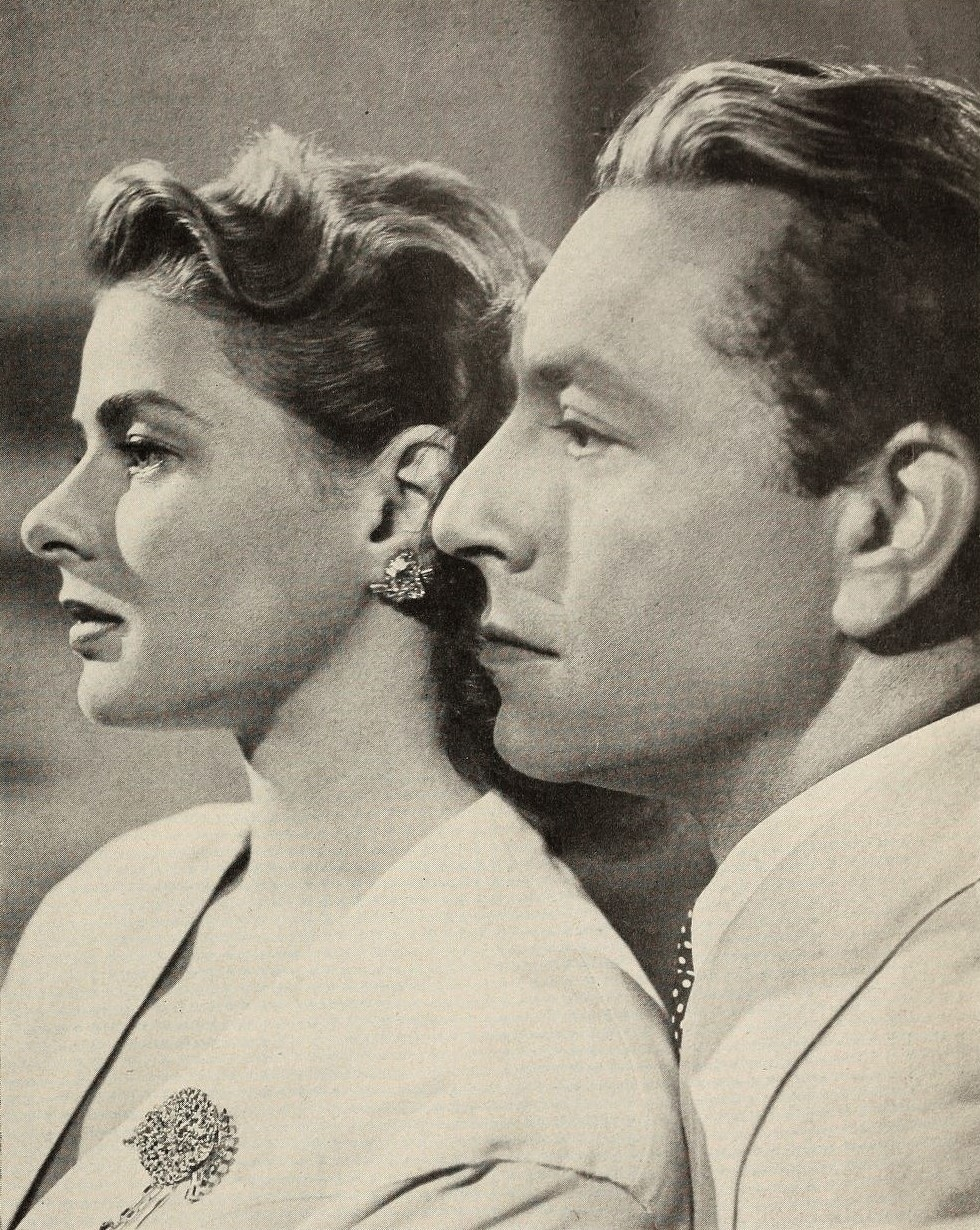
Ingrid Bergman and Paul Henreid in Casablanca

In 1940, von Henreid relocated to New York City. He played a doctor in the 1941 Broadway play, Flight to the West. That same year, he signed a contract with the RKO Pictures in Hollywood. RKO dropped the "von" from his name to make it sound less Germanic. He also became a citizen of the United States. Henreid's first film for RKO was Joan of Paris, a 1942 war drama in which he played a Free French flyer serving in the Royal Air Force trying to escape Occupied France. The film was a big hit.

Moving to Warner Brothers in 1942, the studio cast Henreid as Jeremiah Durrance in the romance Now, Voyager, playing opposite Bette Davis. His role was that of a married man who meets the "spinster" Davis on an ocean voyage. His next role was as Victor Laszlo, an anti-Nazi resistance leader in the 1942 romantic drama Casablanca. The cast included Claude Rains, Humphrey Bogart, and Ingrid Bergman, who plays Laszlo's wife. The film was a critical success and is considered today one of the best American films in history.

After Casablanca, Henreid turned down the male lead alongside Davis in the 1943 dramatic film, Watch on the Rhine. Warner Brothers then paired Henreid with Ida Lupino in the 1944 romantic drama, In Our Time. That same year, the studio cast him as a romantic lead with Eleanor Parker in Between Two Worlds. Also in 1944, Henreid played a lead role in The Conspirators, about a Dutch resistance leader trying to escape Nazi agents in Lisbon. The film's supporting cast included Sydney Greenstreet and Peter Lorre. Henreid rejected another romantic lead with Davis in the 1944 film Mr Skeffington.

Henreid briefly rejoined RKO to play a pirate with Maureen O'Hara in the studio's 1945 swashbuckler, The Spanish Main. Returning to Warner Bros., he was cast in 1946 in Devotion, a biopic of the Brontë family in which Henreid portrays Charlotte Bronte's husband, Arthur Bell Nicholls. He was cast again with Parker in the 1946 adaptation of the Somerset Maugham novel, Of Human Bondage. He played Philip Carey, a medical student with a clubfoot.

Metro-Goldwyn-Mayer (MGM) then borrowed Henreid from Warners to play the composer Robert Schumann in the 1947 film Song of Love, opposite Katharine Hepburn. In his 1984 autobiography Ladies Man, Henreid stated that he then bought out his Warner Brothers contract for $75,000. MGM offered him a long-term contract for $150,000 a year, but he turned it down.

=== Blacklisting and independent films ===
Henreid recounted that in the late 1940s, he participated in a protest by some Hollywood actors in Washington, D.C. against the anti-Communist excesses of the House Committee on Un-American Activities. As a result, he said the major studios in Hollywood blacklisted him from any roles. He produced the film noir Hollow Triumph in 1948.

For the next several years, Henreid was only able to gain roles in independent films with lower budgets. He appeared in the 1949 adventure film Rope of Sand, playing a villain opposite Burt Lancaster. In 1950, Henreid made a low-budget film for Edward and Harry Danziger, So Young, So Bad, as a school psychiatrist. This film was followed by an offer from producer Sam Katzman to play the pirate Jean Lafitte in Last of the Buccaneers (1950). Henreid then went to France for the 1951 romance film Pardon My French. He then returned to Katzman for the 1952 film Thief of Damascus. He directed and played the lead role in For Men Only (1952), a college drama about hazing. Later, in the United Kingdom, he made the films Stolen Face (1952) and Mantrap (1953). He then went back to Katzman for the 1953 fantasy adventure Siren of Bagdad, playing a magician.

=== Return to Hollywood ===
In 1954, Henreid returned to MGM for his first film for a major studio since being blacklisted. He played a minor role in Deep in My Heart, a biopic about the composer Sigmund Romberg. He next moved to Columbia Pictures, where he appeared as a corsair captain in the 1955 film Pirates of Tripoli . He made a cameo appearance in the 1956 comedy Meet Me in Las Vegas. He also appeared at this time on Broadway in the play Festival.

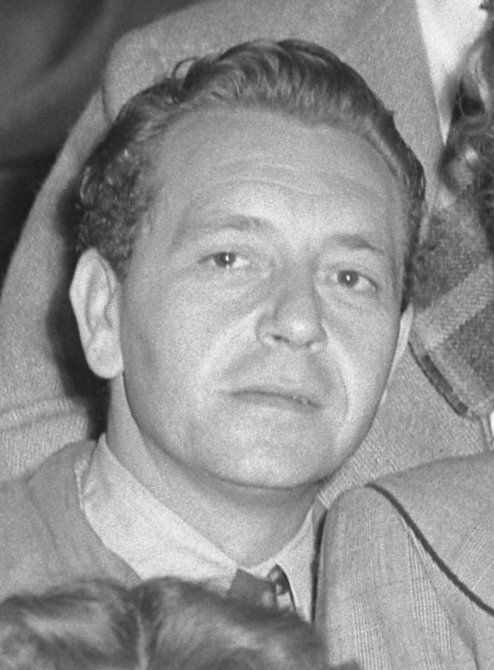
Paul Henreid, 1947

In the early 1950s, Henreid began directing both films and television shows. His directorial credits include American television episodes of:

- Alfred Hitchcock Presents
- Maverick
- Bonanza
- The Virginian
- The Big Valley

Henreid also directed the 1956 film A Woman's Devotion, in which he played a supporting role, Girls on the Loose (1958), and Live Fast, Die Young (1958). In 1964, he directed Dead Ringer, which stars Bette Davis and features Henreid's daughter, Monika Henreid, in a minor role. While working as a director, Henreid continued to accept some small acting parts:

- Ten Thousand Bedrooms (1957)
- Holiday for Lovers (1959)
- Never So Few (1959)
- Four Horsemen of the Apocalypse (1962)
- Operation Crossbow (1965)
- The Madwoman of Chaillot (1969)
- The Failing of Raymond (1971)

In 1973, Henreid returned to Broadway to perform in a revival of the George Bernard Shaw drama, Don Juan in Hell. Henreid's final film role was in the 1977 horror film Exorcist II: The Heretic, where he played a cardinal.

== Personal life ==
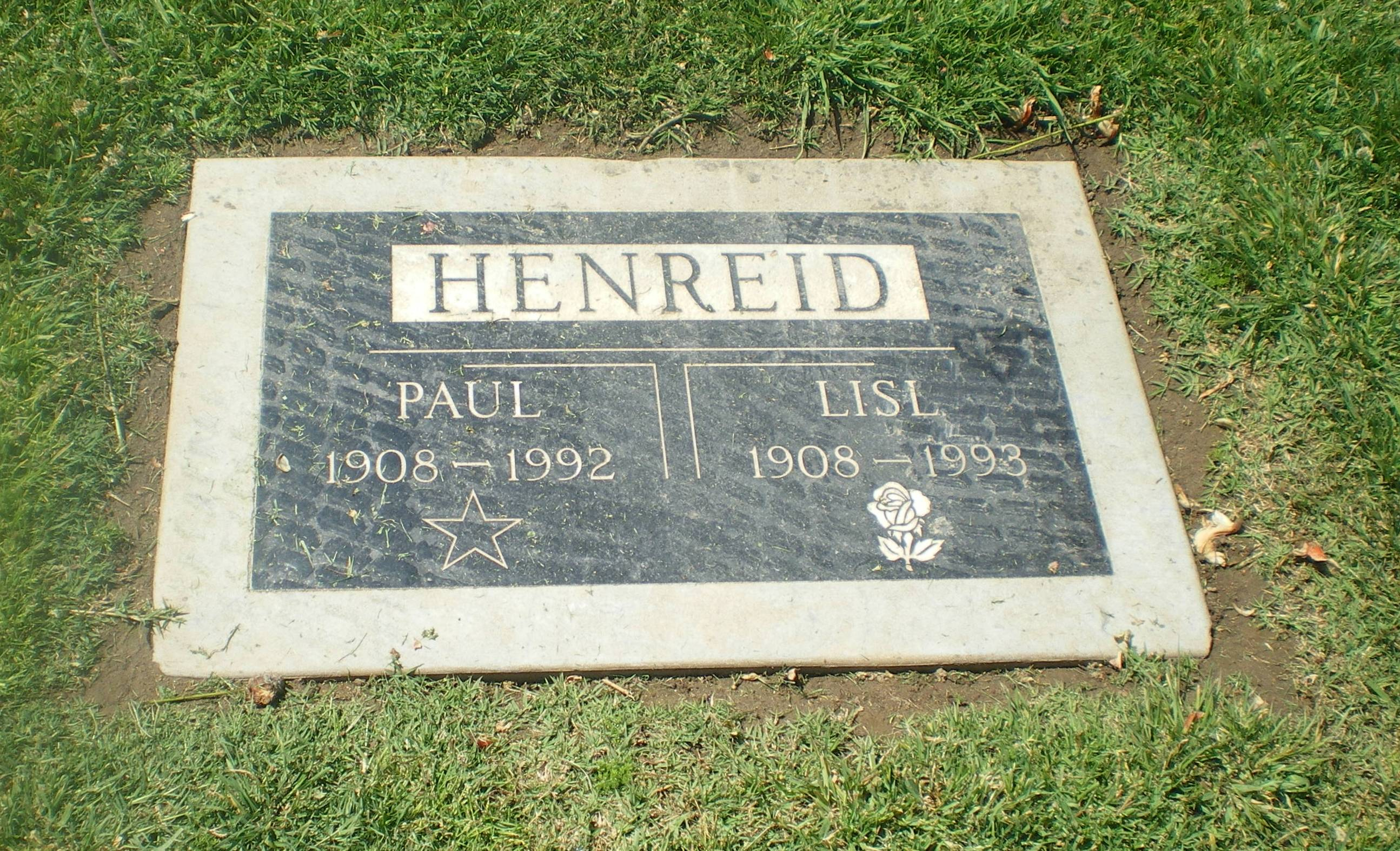
Henreid's grave at Woodlawn Cemetery in Santa Monica

Henreid married Elizabeth Camilla Julia "Lisl" Glück (1908–1993) in 1936; the couple adopted two daughters.

=== Death ===
Henreid died in 1992, at age 84, of pneumonia in Santa Monica, California, after suffering a stroke. He was buried in Woodlawn Cemetery in Santa Monica.

== Legacy ==
The Hollywood Chamber of Commerce in 1960 honored Henreid with two stars on the Hollywood Walk of Fame in Los Angeles. The first, recognizing his film career, is located at 6366 Hollywood Boulevard. The second, for his work in television, is located at 1720 Vine Street.

== Complete filmography ==
=== As actor ===
- Morgenrot (1933)
- Baroud (1933) as uncredited minor role
- Love in Morocco (1933) as uncredited minor role
- Hohe Schule, aka The Secret of Cavelli (1934) as Franz von Ketterer
- Eva (1935) as Fritz
- ...nur ein Komödiant (1935) as Velthen
- Victoria the Great (1937) as uncredited minor role
- Goodbye, Mr. Chips (1939) as Staefel
- An Englishman's Home (1940) as Victor Brandt
- Night Train to Munich (1940) as Capt. Karl Marsen
- Under Your Hat (1940) as uncredited minor role
- Joan of Paris (1942) as Paul Lavallier
- Now, Voyager (1942) as Jeremiah "Jerry" Duvaux Durrance
- Casablanca (1942) as Victor Laszlo
- In Our Time (1944) as Count Stefan Orwid
- Between Two Worlds (1944) as Henry Bergner
- The Conspirators (1944) as Vincent Van Der Lyn
- The Spanish Main (1945) as Capt. Laurent Van Horn
- Devotion (1946) as Rev. Arthur Nicholls
- Of Human Bondage (1946) as Philip Carey
- Deception (1946) as Karel Novak
- Song of Love (1947) as Robert Schumann
- Hollow Triumph, aka The Scar (1948) as John Muller / Dr. Bartok
- Rope of Sand (1949) as Commandant Paul Vogel
- So Young So Bad (1950) as Dr. John H. Jason
- Last of the Buccaneers (1950) as Jean Lafitte
- Pardon My French (1951) (Note: Also the French version Dans la vie tout s'arrange (1952).) – Paul Rencourt
- For Men Only (1952) as Dr. Stephen Brice
- Thief of Damascus (1952) as General Abu Amdar
- Stolen Face (1952) as Dr. Philip Ritter
- Dans la vie tout s'arrange (1952) as Paul Rencourt
- Mantrap, aka Woman in Hiding (1953) as Hugo Bishop
- Siren of Bagdad (1953) as Kazah the Great
- Cabaret (1954) as Konrad Hegner
- Deep in My Heart (1954) as Florenz Ziegfeld
- Pirates of Tripoli (1955) as Edri al-Gadrian
- Meet Me in Las Vegas (1956) as Pierre
- A Woman's Devotion (1956) as Capt. Henrique Monteros
- Ten Thousand Bedrooms (1957) as Anton
- Holiday for Lovers (1959) as Eduardo Barroso
- Never So Few (1959) as Nikko Regas
- Four Horsemen of the Apocalypse (1962) as Etienne Laurier
- Operation Crossbow (1965) as Gen. Ziemann
- The Madwoman of Chaillot (1969) as The General
- The Failing of Raymond (1971, TV Movie) as Dr. Abel
- Death Among Friends (1975, TV Movie) as Otto Schiller
- Exorcist II: The Heretic (1977) as The Cardinal (final film role)

=== As himself or narrator ===
- Hollywood Canteen (1944) – himself
- Peking Remembered (1967 documentary) – narrator

=== As producer ===
- Hollow Triumph (1948)
- For Men Only (1952)

=== As director ===
- The Reprieve (S4/Ep2) (1959)
- A Stranger Everywhere (S4/Ep10) (1968)

==== Film ====
- For Men Only (1952)
- A Woman's Devotion (1956)
- Live Fast, Die Young (1958)
- Girls on the Loose (1958)
- Dead Ringer (1964)
- Ballad in Blue (1964)

==== Television ====
- Maverick "Passage to Fort Doom" (1959)
- The Californians (1957–1959), various episodes
- Alfred Hitchcock Presents TV series episodes "The Landlady", "Cell 227", and 26 others (1957–1962)
- The June Allyson Show (1960) episode "The Lie"
- The Virginian "Long Ride to Wind River" (1966)
- The Big Valley (9 episodes)
- Johnny Staccato episode "The Mask of Jason", "A Nice Little Town" (1960)

=== As writer ===
- Ballad in Blue (1964) (story)

=== Music ===
- Deception (1946) (Hollenius' Cello Concerto, Cello Concerto in D major, uncredited and dubbed by Eleanor Slatkin)
- Stolen Face (1952) (song "Rolling Home")

== Radio appearances ==
Year	Program	Episode/source	Notes
5/10/43	Lux Radio Theatre	"Now, Voyager"	w/ Ida Lupino
9/10/45	Lux Radio Theatre	"Experiment Perilous"	w/ Virginia Bruce
10/1/45	Lux Radio Theatre	"Mr. Skeffington"	w/ Bette Davis
1/3/46	Suspense	"Angel of Death"	
3/14/46	Suspense	"No More Alice"	
