= Dans la vie tout s'arrange =

1952 film by Marcel Cravenne

A poster for the film

Dans la vie tout s'arrange is a 1952 French comedy film directed by Marcel Cravenne and starring Merle Oberon, Paul Henreid and Jim Gérald. It is a French-language version of the 1951 film The Lady from Boston. The screenplay concerns an American woman who arrives in a small French town where she has inherited a chateau, only to discover it is already inhabited by squatters.

== Cast ==
- Merle Oberon - Elizabeth Rockwell
- Paul Henreid - Paul Rencourt
- Jim Gérald - Monsieur Poisson
- Maximilienne - Madame Bleubois
- Alexandre Rignault
- Paul Bonifas - Monsieur Bleubois
- Martial Rèbe - Mobet
- Lucien Callamand - L'inspector
- Marina Vlady - La petite Jacqueline
- Dora Doll - Yvette
- Víctor Merenda - François
- Laura Daryl - Mme. Mobet
- Gilberte Defoucault - Marie-Claire
- Gérard Rosset - Michel
- Albert Cullaz - André
- André Aversa - Pierrot
- Nicole Monnin - Marcella
