= The Spanish Main =

1945 film by Frank Borzage

- Poster
- Directed by: Frank Borzage
- Written by: George Worthing Yates; Herman J. Mankiewicz
- Based on: story by Aeneas MacKenzie
- Produced by: Frank Borzage
- Starring: Maureen O'Hara; Paul Henreid; Walter Slezak; Binnie Barnes
- Cinematography: George Barnes
- Edited by: Ralph Dawson
- Music by: Hanns Eisler
- Distributed by: RKO Radio Pictures
- Release date: October 4, 1945 (U.S.)
- Running time: 100 minutes
- Language: English
- Budget: $2 million
- Box office: 2,819,971 admissions (France)

The Spanish Main is a 1945 American adventure film starring Paul Henreid, Maureen O'Hara, Walter Slezak and Binnie Barnes, and directed by Frank Borzage. It was RKO's first all-Technicolor film since Becky Sharp ten years before.

Cinematographer George Barnes received an Oscar nomination for Best Color Cinematography. Though a box-office hit upon its first release, the film is chiefly remembered today for its lavish and intricate score by Hanns Eisler.

== Plot ==
Dutch sea captain Laurent van Horn is shipwrecked off the coast of the Spanish settlement of Cartagena. After being held and sentenced to death, Van Horn and his crew manage to escape. Five years later, Van Horn has established himself as the mysterious pirate known only by the name of his ship: The Barracuda. After infiltrating the vessel ferrying her to her wedding, they capture Contessa Francisca Alvarado who has been arranged to marry the corrupt governor. Wishing to avoid further bloodshed aboard the escort ship, Francisca offers to marry Van Horn if he will spare the escort, to which he agrees. Over time Francisca and Van Horn become attracted to each other and set out to defeat the villainous governor Don Juan Alvarado and treacherous pirates Du Billar and Capt. Black.

== Cast ==
- Maureen O'Hara as Francisca Alvarado
- Paul Henreid as Capt. Laurent van Horn
- Walter Slezak as Don Juan Alvarado
- Binnie Barnes as Anne Bonny
- John Emery as Mario Da Bilar
- Barton MacLane as Capt. Black
- J. M. Kerrigan as Pillery Gow
- Fritz Leiber as Bishop
- Nancy Gates as Lupita
- Jack LaRue as Lt. Escobar
- Mike Mazurki as Erik Swaine
- Ian Keith as Captain Lussan
- Curt Bois as Paree
- Antonio Moreno as Commandante
- Victor Kilian as Santa Madre Captain
- James Dime as a pirate

The film includes the character Anne Bonny (Barnes), a heavily fictionalized version of the real-life female pirate. Walter Slezak played a similar (but less dastardly) role in the later film The Pirate (1948).

== Development ==
=== Script ===
Paul Henreid wrote in his memoirs that the film was his idea. He said he was "getting tired of being cast as the suave ladies' man and I had definitely decided no more Nazis so I started thinking in terms of something that would be more fun, a swashbuckling part in a pirate story."

Henreid was under contract to Warner Bros.; he wrote up a treatment and took it to head of production Jack L. Warner, who refused to make the film. Henreid said his agent at the time, Lew Wasserman, advised him audiences would not accept him "swinging from the yardarm with a bare chest".

However, the actor remained enthusiastic. Henreid had an existing commitment with RKO to make one film a year dating from his appearance in Joan of Paris, so he decided to take the movie there. Henreid said RKO's then head of production Charles Koerner loved the treatment and agreed to make the film.

In October 1943, RKO announced the film would be their big spectacle of the following year, to star Paul Henreid, Maureen O'Hara, George Sanders and Walter Slezak. It was based on an original story and script by Aneas MacKenzie By the end of the month, Sanders was out and replaced by Arturo de Córdova with Robert Fellows to produce.

Henreid said RKO assigned script writing duties to George Worthing Yates but when the actor read the first hundred pages "I hated all of it. It was a completely different story from the one I had concocted and I was furious." Henreid said he refused to make the movie until it was rewritten following his outline. This was done, but Henreid claimed the forty new pages he was sent "was exactly the same as Yates' first draft." (He does not mention Aeneas MacKenzie in his memoirs.)

Henreid knew RKO had already started building sets for the film which was budgeted at $2 million, which gave him great leverage. He insisted he be given powers as producer and that Yates be taken off the project. He persuaded Herman J. Mankiewicz, then under contract to RKO, to rewrite the script. Henreid called Mankiewicz's work "his first adventure story was perfect, an exciting thrilling story with everything I wanted in it."

"Pirate pictures always make money", said producer Robert Fellows.

=== Casting ===
In January 1944 RKO announced that O'Hara would be replaced by Laraine Day who had signed a contract with the studio.

In July 1944 RKO announced it as part of its slate for the following year by which stage O'Hara was back on the project. In August, RKO signed Walter Slezak to a two-picture a year deal the first of which was to be The Spanish Main. Ann Dvorak and Binnie Barnes both auditioned for the second female lead with Barnes ultimately being successful.

== Shooting ==
Filming started November 15, 1944. The budget was expected to be at least $1,750,000.

In May 1945, Hollywood was affected by a strike of crew members. This held up shooting on the film which still had 28 days of filming miniatures to go. By then The Wall Street Journal said the cost was two and a quarter million dollars.

Henreid says the finale of the script involved a slave revolt and the burning of Tortuga, but Koerner refused to film it as it would cost an extra $200,000. Henreid wanted to do the ending, and Koerner agreed if Henreid would provide the $200,000 but Lew Wasserman advised him against it. Mankiewicz was so upset about the ending being charged that he refused to do it and another writer had to be hired for the job.

== Release ==
The film was successful and made a profit of $1,485,000. Henreid says Dore Schary, later head of production of RKO, told him the movie made $14 million.

== See also ==
- Women in piracy

== Notes ==
- Henreid, Paul; Fast, Julius (1984). Ladies man : an autobiography. St. Martin's Press. ISBN 9780312463847.
