= Paul Bonifas =

French actor (1902–1975)

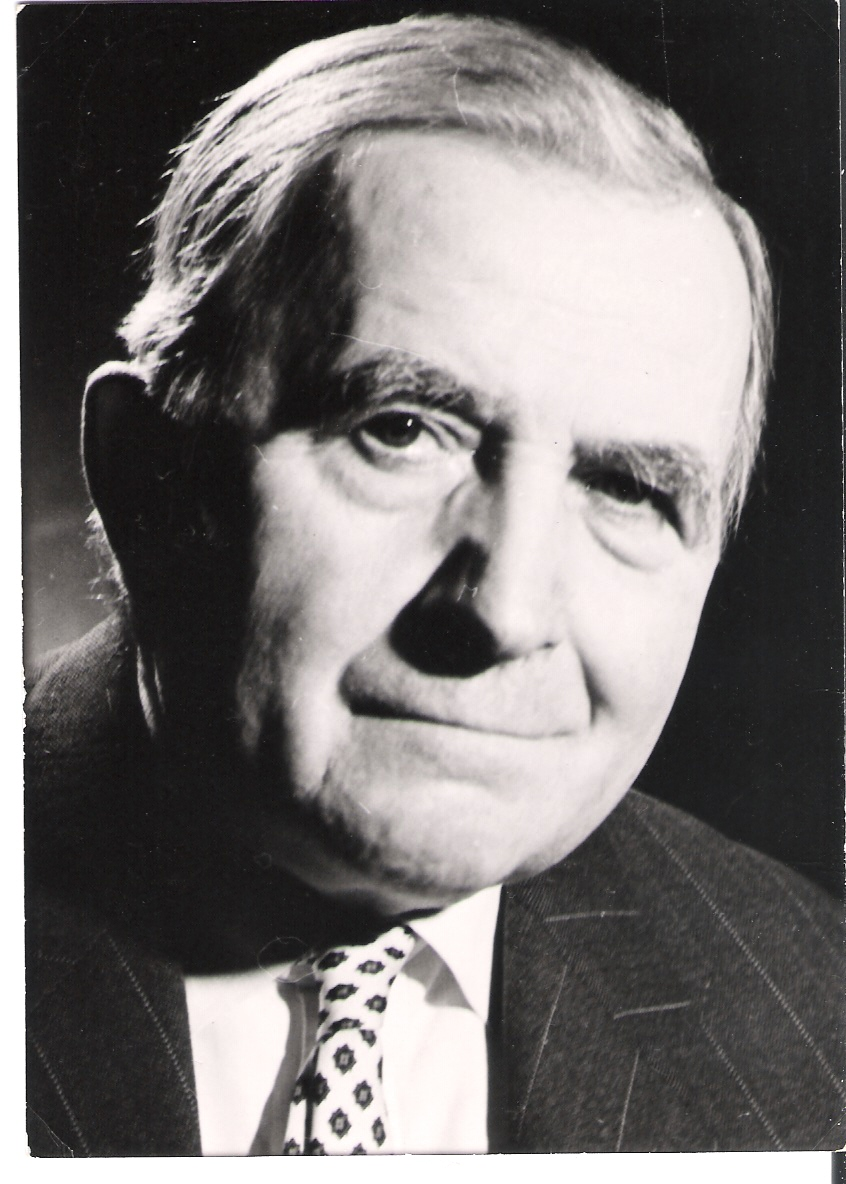
- Born: 3 June 1902; Paris, France
- Died: 9 November 1975 (aged 73); Vernouillet, Yvelines, France
- Other names: Paul Boniface; Victor Boniface; Bonifas
- Occupation: Actor
- Years active: 1933–1975

Paul Bonifas (3 June 1902 – 9 November 1975) was a French actor, born in Paris.

== Career ==
In the 1920s, while working for the French customs service, Bonifas took classes in acting at the Conservatoire de Paris in his spare time. He left with the first prize for comedy, which allowed him to join the Odéon Theatre in 1933, then the Comédie-Française in 1938.

He made his first film appearance in 1935 in a version of Dostoyevsky's Crime and Punishment, directed by Pierre Chenal.

During World War II he served as a lieutenant in the artillery, was badly wounded, and evacuated from Dunkirk with his unit. In London he joined the Free French, and worked for Radio Londres broadcasting to occupied France.

In 1942 he appeared in the film The Foreman Went to France.

In 1943 he formed "The Molière Players", who staged a repertoire of mainly Molière works in London theatres, as well as in regional towns and at French army barracks. He came to the Comedy Theatre, London with Théâtre Molierè in 1943 and 1944, performing in L'Anglais Tel Qu'on Le Parle, Le Malade Imaginaire, Gringoire, Le Misanthrope et L'Auvergnat, Les Femmes Savantes, Le Paquebot Tenacity, La Testament Du Pere Leleu and L'Extra. His Company included Andre Frere, Georges Rex, Suzette Marquis, Elma Soiron and Paul Clarus.

In 1944 "The Molière Players" appeared in the short film Aventure malgache directed by Alfred Hitchcock. This was written by, and based on the experiences of, Jules Francois Clermont, an actor in Bonifas' troupe working under the name of Paul Clarus, who had operated an illegal radio station Madagascar Libre in Madagascar while the island was under Vichy control.

Bonifas then appeared in a number of other British films, including Two Fathers with Bernard Miles, directed by Anthony Asquith, and had minor roles in the musicals Heaven Is Round the Corner and Champagne Charlie, the action adventure film The Man from Morocco, the comedy-drama Johnny Frenchman and the horror film Dead of Night.

Bonifas returned to France in 1946 and resumed his career in theatre, specializing in comedy, but also taking dramatic roles.

His later film career included appearances in Trapeze (1956), The Hunchback of Notre Dame (1956), Fanny (1961), Charade (1963), Greed in the Sun (1964), The Train (1964), Is Paris Burning? (1966), Triple Cross (1966), and The Return of the Tall Blond Man with One Black Shoe (1974).

== Death ==
Bonifas died on 9 November 1975 at Vernouillet, Yvelines, France.

== Selected filmography ==
- Le voyage de Monsieur Perrichon (1934)
- Crime and Punishment (1935) (uncredited)
- Les Cinq Sous de Lavarède (1939) as Un marin
- The Porter from Maxim's (1939)
- The Big Blockade (1942) Bit Part (uncredited)
- The Foreman Went to France (1942) as Prefect of Rouville
- Candlelight in Algeria (1944) as French Proprietor
- Heaven Is Round the Corner (1944) as Rostond
- English Without Tears (1944) as Monsieur Rolland
- Champagne Charlie (1944) as Targetino
- The Man from Morocco (1945) as French Mayor
- Dead of Night (1945) as French Nightclub Patron (segment "Ventriloquist's Dummy") (uncredited)
- Johnny Frenchman (1945) as Jerome
- Lisbon Story (1946) as Stephan Corelle
- Bedelia (1946) as Insurance Manager
- Juliette, or Key of Dreams (1951) as La capitaine du cargo
- Clara de Montargis (1951)
- Pardon My French (1951) as Monsieur Bleubois
- Monsieur Fabre (1951) as Le ministre Victor Duruy
- Duel in Dakar (1951) as Le commandant
- Take Me to Paris (1951)
- The Green Glove (1952) as Inspector
- La Vérité sur Bébé Donge (1952) as Le voyageur (uncredited)
- Dans la vie tout s'arrange (1952) as Monsieur Bleubois
- Piédalu Works Miracles (1952)
- Love in the Vineyard (1952) as L'Américain
- Holiday for Henrietta (1952) as Le marchand de journaux (uncredited)
- Open Letter (1953) as Honoré - le peau-père
- Their Last Night (1953) as Le commissaire principal
- Frou-Frou (1955) as Le réceptionniste de l'hôtel (uncredited)
- Marie Antoinette Queen of France (1956) as Herman
- Trapeze (1956) as Paul - circus peddler (uncredited)
- La Terreur des dames (1956)
- The Hunchback of Notre Dame (1956) as Master Lecornu
- The Case of Doctor Laurent (1957) as Guillaumin
- Mademoiselle and Her Gang (1957) as La patron du bistrot
- Nous autres à Champignol (1957)
- Les Espions (1957) as Mr. Barjot (uncredited)
- Rafles sur la ville (1958) as L'inspecteur Renaud
- Les Misérables (1958) as Le médecin de l'hôpital
- En légitime défense (1958) as Le président de la cour
- The Female (1959) as L'aubergiste
- Archimède le clochard (1959) (uncredited)
- The Enemy General (1960) as Mayor
- Love and the Frenchwoman (1960) as Ginette"s father (segment "Virginité, La")
- The Gigolo (1960) (uncredited)
- The Truth (1960) as Un greffier
- Goodbye Again (1961) as Cellarman (uncredited)
- Fanny (1961) as The Postman
- Le Miracle des loups (1961) as Le chirurgien / Doctor of Louis XI
- Cause toujours, mon lapin (1961)
- Sundays and Cybele (1963) as L'épicier
- Jeff Gordon, Secret Agent (1963) as Le notaire
- The Trip to Biarritz (1963) as Bourrély
- Les Abysses (1963) as Mons. Lapeyre
- Charade (1963) as Mr. Felix
- Greed in the Sun (1964) as Dr. Magnart
- The Train (1964) as Spinet
- La Sentinelle endormie (1965) as Lanier
- Who Are You, Polly Maggoo? (1966)
- Is Paris Burning? (1966) as Mayor (uncredited)
- Triple Cross (1966) as Charlie
- Very Happy Alexander (1968) as Le garde (uncredited)
- La Promesse (1969) as Gustave
- The Christmas Tree (1969) (uncredited)
- La Horse (1970) as Un témoin lors de l'accident dela voiture
- Cold Sweat (1970) as The doctor
- Donkey Skin (1970) as Le quatrième médecin
- Love Me Strangely (1971) as Le portier de l'hôtel
- The Train (1973) as Le voisin
- Hail the Artist (1974) as Le vieil acteur
- The Return of the Tall Blond Man with One Black Shoe (1974)
- The Common Man (1975) as Le maire
- Rosebud (1975) as man with 2 CV
