= The Raiders (1952 film) =

1952 film by Lesley Selander

- Directed by: Lesley Selander
- Written by: Lyn Crost Kennedy
- Screenplay by: Polly James; Lillie Hayward
- Produced by: William Alland
- Starring: Richard Conte; Viveca Lindfors; Barbara Britton
- Cinematography: Carl E. Guthrie
- Edited by: Paul Weatherwax
- Color process: Technicolor
- Production company: Universal International Pictures
- Distributed by: Universal Pictures
- Release date: November 20, 1952
- Running time: 80 minutes
- Country: United States
- Language: English

The Raiders is a 1952 American Technicolor Western film directed by Lesley Selander and starring Richard Conte and Viveca Lindfors. It was produced and distributed by Universal Pictures. It was later reissued as Riders of Vengeance.

== Plot ==
Going west where gold is being found, Jan Morell and wife Mary meet in the Napa, California, valley with his prospector brother Frank, but soon hired gunmen Jack Welch and Hank Purvis steal the gold they have panned and kill Mary.

In town, Frank is killed, as well, and Jan seriously wounded. He is cared for by Felipe de Ortega and sister Elena, who explain that Welch and Purvis work for dishonest Mayor Thomas Ainsworth, who also stole the Ortega family's land and property. An approval of statehood for California could restore law and order, as well as citizens' rights.

Elena fears for their safety, but Jan joins forces with Felipe's men to create havoc in Ainsworth's life, rustling horses and stealing money. A new U.S. marshal, Henderson, places a $5,000 reward on him, but Jan nevertheless captures Purvis and threatens to lynch him if he does not confess to Ainsworth's misdeeds. Elizabeth Ainsworth now begins to understand her father's corrupt ways.

As the gunfighting intensifies, both Welch and Felipe are killed. Jan is arrested and faces the hangman, but Henderson believes in his innocence and is able to release him when statehood wins approval and a general amnesty is granted. Jan and Elena plan a new life together.

== Cast ==
- Richard Conte as Jan Morrell
- Viveca Lindfors as Elena de Ortega
- Barbara Britton as Elizabeth Ainsworth
- William Bishop as Marshal Bill Henderson
- Hugh O'Brian as Hank Purvis
- Morris Ankrum as Thomas Ainsworth
- Margaret Field as Mary Morrell
- Richard Martin as Felipe de Ortega
- William Reynolds as Frank Morrell
- Gregg Palmer as Marty Smith (as Palmer Lee)
- John Kellogg as Jack Welch
- Frank Wilcox as Sam Sterling
- Carlos Rivero as Ramon
- I. Stanford Jolley as Mountain Jim Ferris
- Neyle Morrow as Juan
- Francis McDonald as Mr. John Cummings
- George J. Lewis as Vicente (as George Lewis)
- Virginia Mullen as Mrs. Abby Cummings
