= Virginia Mullen =

American actress

- Born: Virginia Colette Mullen; March 11, 1906; Kentucky
- Died: January 30, 1988 (aged 81); Fortuna, California, U.S.
- Occupation(s): Actress, writer
- Years active: 1950s

Virginia Mullen was an American actress mostly active in the 1950s.

== Selected filmography ==
- Dream Wife (1953) as Annie
- The Great Sioux Uprising (1953) as Madge Baird
- Come Back, Little Sheba (1953) as Henrietta Colby
- It Came from Outer Space (1953) as Mrs. Frank Daylon
- Bright Victory (1952) as Mrs. Coe
- The Raiders (1952) as Mrs. Abby Cummings
- For Men Only (1952) as Mrs. Palmer
- Not Wanted (1949) as Mrs. Banning
- The Naked City (1948) as Martha Swenson
- Canon City (1948) as Mrs. Smith
