= A Woman's Devotion =

1956 film by Paul Henreid

- Theatrical release poster
- Directed by: Paul Henreid
- Screenplay by: Robert Hill
- Story by: Robert Hill
- Produced by: Herbert J. Yates; John Bash
- Starring: Ralph Meeker; Janice Rule; Paul Henreid
- Cinematography: Jorge Stahl Jr.
- Edited by: Richard L. Van Enger
- Music by: Les Baxter
- Color process: Trucolor
- Production company: Republic Pictures
- Distributed by: Republic Pictures
- Release date: November 16, 1956
- Running time: 88 minutes
- Countries: Mexico; United States
- Language: English

A Woman's Devotion is a 1956 American film noir directed by Paul Henreid and starring Ralph Meeker, Janice Rule, Henreid and Rosenda Monteros. It was produced and distributed by Republic Pictures.

== Plot ==
Artist Trevor Stevenson (Meeker), an emotionally scarred World War II veteran, is on honeymoon in Acapulco with his bride Stella (Rule). Shortly after their arrival, two women are murdered. The audience is presented with clues pointing to Trevor's guilt or innocence depending upon one's point of view.

== Cast ==
- Ralph Meeker as Trevor Stevenson
- Janice Rule as Stella Stevenson
- Paul Henreid as Capt. Henrique Monteros
- Rosenda Monteros as María
- Fanny Schiller as Señora Reidl
- José Torvay as Gómez
- Yerye Beirute as Amigo Herrera
- Tony Carbajal as Sergeant
- Jaime González Quiñones as Roberto
- Carlos Riquelme as Chief of police

== Production ==
The film was originally known as Acapulco. Henreid says he got Franz Waxman to score the picture but Herbert Yates of Republic overruled him.

== Reception ==
Henreid later claimed the film was "absolutely ruined" by the studio. "It was a decent film, not a great film by any means... apparently they didn't understand the film at all and they cut essential parts."

== See also ==
- List of American films of 1956
