= David Hempstead =

American film producer

- Born: October 2, 1909; Salt Lake City, Utah, United States
- Died: January 9, 1983 (aged 73); Los Angeles County, California, United States
- Occupation: Film producer

David Hempstead (October 2, 1909 - January 9, 1983) was an American film producer known for None but the Lonely Heart (1944), The Sky's the Limit (1943), directed by Edward H. Griffith, and Joan of Paris (1942), directed by Robert Stevenson. He co-wrote the script of Hell and High Water (1954) alongside Jesse Lasky.

He produced with RKO and worked alongside Milton Holmes. He also produced Village Tale (1935), directed by John Cromwell and written by Allan Scott.

== Filmography ==
=== Producer ===
- The King and Four Queens (1956)
- Portrait of Jennie (1948)
- None But the Lonely Heart (1944)
- Tender Comrade (1943)
- The Sky's the Limit (1943)
- Mr. Lucky (1943)
- Flight for Freedom (1943)
- Joan of Paris (1942)
- Kitty Foyle (1940)
- It Could Happen to You (1939)
- Just Around the Corner (1938)
- Straight Place and Show (1938)
- Hold That Co-ed (1938)
- Little Miss Broadway (1938)
- Happy Landing (1938)
- Ali Baba Goes to Town (1937)
- Village Tale (1935)
- Murder on a Honeymoon (1935)

=== Writer ===
- Hell and High Water (1954)
- Finishing School (1934)
- Little Women (1933)
- Manhattan Tower (1932)

=== Director ===
- Banjo on My Knee (1936)

== Bibliography ==
- Reid, John Howard (2005). Hollywood Gold: Films of the Forties and Fifties. Lulu.com. p. 258. ISBN 9781411635241.
