= The Failing of Raymond =

1971 television film directed by Boris Sagal

- Genre: Thriller
- Written by: Adrian Spies
- Directed by: Boris Sagal
- Starring: Jane Wyman; Dean Stockwell; Dana Andrews; Paul Henreid; Murray Hamilton
- Music by: Pat Williams
- Country of origin: United States
- Original language: English

Production
- Producer: George Eckstein
- Cinematography: Ben Colman
- Editors: John Kaufman, Jr.
- Running time: 73 minutes
- Production company: Universal Television

Original release
- Network: ABC
- Release: November 27, 1971

The Failing of Raymond is a 1971 American made-for-television psychological thriller film starring Jane Wyman (in her television film debut), Dean Stockwell, Dana Andrews, Paul Henreid and Murray Hamilton. It aired as the ABC Movie of the Week on November 27, 1971.

== Plot ==
Raymond is a disturbed young man who escapes from a psychiatric hospital with a plot to exact revenge on his former teacher, whom he believes unjustly failed him on a high school exam 10 years earlier. The failing grade kept him from graduating from high school, causing Raymond's life to begin a downward spiral for which he blames the teacher, Miss Mary Bloomquist.

As Raymond stalks Mary on the eve of her retirement, the authorities are trying to find him, but they have no idea where he is going. In spite of the visions in his head and having been diagnosed as a “paranoiac”, Raymond does not seem especially threatening, presenting a calm (if somewhat distracted) demeanor marked by a notably polite manner. His first attempt at achieving his goal of retaking and passing the test is sidetracked by Miss Bloomquist's mistaking him for a helper answering her want ad. Raymond spends time packing Mary's belongings in her classroom and tying up boxes, only to miss his opportunity when Mary's coworkers burst in to take her to a surprise retirement party.

Raymond then goes to Mary's home, but his attempt to break in is interrupted by children playing hide-and-seek. He spends the night in a boarding house, and returns to the school the next day, which is also the last day of the school year. As Raymond waits for the school to empty, he discovers that there is a man with Mary, and hides in a nearby classroom.

The man is Mary's former lover, a married teacher with whom she broke up 10 years previously. He transferred to another school, but returned in the current school year to become the new English department head. He believes that Mary is taking early retirement because his return is too painful for her, but she straightens him out by revealing that it is her disillusionment with her abilities as a teacher that is the reason she's moving to England. Somewhat crestfallen, he leaves.

Meanwhile, the detective searching for Raymond has returned to the hospital, and—with the help of Raymond's doctor—gains a valuable clue to Raymond's whereabouts. The detective spends hours going through newspapers in the hospital library in search of the one from which Raymond tore out an article.

Raymond's reappearance takes Mary by surprise. He says because she overpaid him, he has come back to finish. What he has come back to finish becomes clear when he takes Mary hostage until dark, when he forces her to give him the same test he took 10 years earlier. This time, he answers the last two questions that he did not complete the first time, but fails again, spurring him to attack Mary with murderous intent.

As he approaches her with a garrote fashioned from twine, he trips over a box in the aisle and falls, allowing Mary to escape the classroom. As he searches for her in the darkened school, Raymond's shouted, disconnected ramblings about “welfare money” and being called stupid, combined with the information he shared earlier about his troubled life, give Mary an inspiration. She uses a commanding “teacher voice” to tell him to sit down and behave in her classroom. Just then, Raymond finds the light switch, illuminating the auditorium they are in. Undeterred, Mary tells him to follow her back to the classroom “with decorum”. Raymond obeys.

Back in the classroom, Raymond snaps out of his docile mood and again takes control of Mary. As he is about to tighten a garotte around her neck, she apologizes for failing him, not on the exam, but as a teacher. With that, she offers to teach him the material he missed on the exam, and he drops the garotte to sit at one of the school desks. As Mary begins to talk about the questions Raymond missed, two local police officers enter the room, having been sent by a phone call from the detective. Mary informs them that they are disrupting her class and sends them to wait outside. After sharing some biographical information about Samuel Taylor Coleridge, a “very famous man” who never finished school and needed a doctor's help, Miss Bloomquist tells Raymond that she will come to “where you live now” every day to teach him, at least until September, when she will come only on weekends, because she is not going to retire from teaching.

== Cast ==
- Jane Wyman as Mary Bloomquist
- Dean Stockwell as Raymond
- Dana Andrews as Allan McDonald
- Paul Henreid as Dr. Abel
- Murray Hamilton as Sergeant Manzak
- Tim O'Connor as Cliff Roeder
- Priscilla Pointer as History teacher
- Mary Jackson as Latin Teacher
- Adrienne Marden as Librarian
- Katey Sagal as Girl Patient (credited as "Catherine Louise Sagal")
