= Everley Gregg =

English actress (1900–1959)

Gregg as Dolly Messiter in Brief Encounter, 1945

Everley Gregg (born Eileen Gertrude Russell Gregg; 26 October 1900 – 9 June 1959), was an English actress. Early in her career, she became associated especially with plays of Noël Coward. She began making films in the 1930s and added television roles in her last decade; she acted until her last year.

== Life and career ==
Gregg was born in the village of Owslebury, Hampshire, the second daughter of Richard Russell Gregg, an accountant, and his wife Gertrude Everley, née Pope. Her mother struggled with alcoholism and died when she was five years old. She was educated at Badminton School, Bristol, and the Royal Academy of Dramatic Art. She made her professional stage debut as the maid in Noël Coward's Easy Virtue at the Duke of York's Theatre, London.

Engagements in minor parts followed in The Constant Nymph, tours in Easy Virtue and Hit the Deck, and a repertory season at the Alexandra Theatre, Birmingham. In the West End in 1929, she succeeded Phyllis Konstam as Val Power in The Matriarch. Her association with the plays of Coward was renewed at the Phoenix Theatre in September 1930 when she played Louise in Private Lives.

Her West End roles in the early 1930s were Mrs. Agnew in Five Farthings (1931), the telephone girl in Grand Hotel (1931), Georgina in Stepdaughters of War, Ruth in Dance With No Music (1932), Mrs. Gilbard in Behold, We Live (1933), Susanne in Love For Sale, and Miss Goslett in Coward's Conversation Piece (1934).

In January 1935, Gregg made her first appearance on the New York stage at the Ethel Barrymore Theatre as Hilda James in Coward's Point Valaine. After returning to London, she played seven parts in Coward's Tonight at 8.30 cycle of short plays. Later roles included Miss Prism in The Importance of Being Earnest, Freda Caplan in Dangerous Corner, and Grace Torrence in Coward's Design for Living.

Gregg made her film debut in the 1933 film The Private Life of Henry VIII as Catherine Parr, Henry's last wife. A small part as a nurse in David Lean's 1942 film In Which We Serve was followed by a more substantial role in Lean's Brief Encounter (1945) as "Dolly Messiter", the "gossiping acquaintance" of Laura Jesson, played by Celia Johnson, in which Gregg had appeared in the earlier stage version of the piece Still Life in Tonight at 8.30.

In the 1950s Gregg appeared on BBC television in a range of productions from a dramatisation of Tess of the D'Urbervilles in 1952 (as Mrs Durbeyfield) to mysteries such as My Guess Would be Murder (1957), comedies including Haul for the Shore (1956), historical drama such as The Scarlet Pimpernel (1955), and contemporary drama including Let us be True (1953).

In 1930, Gregg married the scenic designer and painter David McCall Homan in Liverpool, but the marriage was dissolved within a few years. She died of natural causes at her home in Beaconsfield, Buckinghamshire in 1959, aged 58.

== Filmography ==
In addition to her stage and television roles, Gregg appeared in more than fifty films:

- The Private Life of Henry VIII (1933) – Katherine Parr
- The Scoundrel (1935) – Mildred Langweiler
- The Ghost Goes West (1935) – Mrs Gladys Martin
- Thunder in the City (1937) – Millie
- I, Claudius (1937; unfinished film) – Domita, Messalina's mother
- Pygmalion (1938) – Mrs Eynsford Hill
- Blondes for Danger (1938) – Hetty Hopper
- Spies of the Air (1940) – Mrs Madison
- Freedom Radio (1941) – Maria Tattenheim
- Uncensored (1942) – (uncredited)
- In Which We Serve (1942) – nurse
- The Gentle Sex (1943) – Miss Simpson
- The Demi-Paradise (1943) – Mrs Flannel
- Two Fathers (1944, Short) – cast member
- Brief Encounter (1945) – Dolly Messiter
- Gaiety George (1946) – Landlady (uncredited)
- I See a Dark Stranger (1946) – first woman in train
- Great Expectations (1946) – Sara Pocket
- The Woman in the Hall (1947) – Lady Cloy
- The Huggetts Abroad (1949) – Miss Phipps
- Marry Me! (1949) – Miss Pilby (uncredited)
- Madeleine (1950) – Madame Paroni
- The Astonished Heart (1950) – Miss Harper
- Stage Fright (1950) – Charlotte's Dressmaker (uncredited)
- The Woman in Question (1950) – first woman customer
- The Franchise Affair (1951) – Mrs Jarrett
- Worm's Eye View (1951) – Mrs Bounty
- The Magic Box (1951) – bridegroom's mother in wedding group
- High Treason (1951) – Mrs. Finch-Harvey - Music Club Member (uncredited)
- Stolen Face (1952) – Lady Harringay
- Moulin Rouge (1952) – Disgusted Woman at Salon (uncredited)
- The Promise (1952)
- A Spot of Bother (1952, Short)
- Personal Affair (1953) – Mrs Welsh (uncredited)
- Father Brown (1954) – governess
- The Night of the Full Moon (1954) – Mrs Jeans
- Lost (1956) – Viscountess
- The Man Who Never Was (1956) – club matron (uncredited)
- The Hostage (1956) – Mrs Barnes
- Brothers in Law (1957) – Mrs Barber
- Carry On Admiral (1957) – Housekeeper (uncredited)
- Bachelor of Hearts (1958) – Lady Don
- Room at the Top (1959) – mayoress (uncredited)
- Deadly Record (1959) – Mrs Mac
- Danger List (1959, Short) – neighbour (final film role)

Source: British Film Institute.

== Sources ==
- Parker, John, ed. (1939). Who's Who in the Theatre (fourth ed.). London: Sir Isaac Pitman and Sons. OCLC 10013159.
- Bucks Free Press, 'Actress Dies', 12 June 1959.
