= Village Tale =

1935 US film directed by John Cromwell

- Directed by: John Cromwell; Kenny Holmes (assistant)
- Written by: Allan Scott
- Produced by: David Hempstead
- Starring: Randolph Scott; Kay Johnson; Arthur Hohl; Robert Barrat
- Cinematography: Nick Musuraca
- Edited by: William Morgan
- Music by: Alberto Colombo
- Production company: RKO Radio Pictures
- Release date: May 10, 1935 (US)
- Running time: 80 minutes
- Country: United States
- Language: English

Village Tale is a 1935 American drama film directed by John Cromwell and starring Randolph Scott, Kay Johnson, Arthur Hohl, and Robert Barrat. The screenplay by Allan Scott was adapted from author and scenarist Phil Stong in his 1934 novel of the same name. Produced by RKO Radio Pictures, it was released on May 10, 1935.

== Plot ==
“...about a small town and its dramas...described as a series of character studies rather than a plot.”

Film historians Raymond Durgnat and Scott Simmon offer this brief synopsis of Cromwell's adaption of novelist Phil Stong’s tale of rural life, starring Randolph Scott as Slaughter Somerville:

“The vicious world of a third Phil Stong film, Village Tale, directed by John Cromwell in 1935, where a passel of the town’s old boys hang around the general store to concoct vengeful schemes they can only carry out as a mob…”

== Cast ==
- Randolph Scott as T. N. 'Slaughter' Somerville
- Kay Johnson as Janet Stevenson
- Arthur Hohl Elmer Stevenson
- Robert Barrat as Drury Stevenson
- Janet Beecher as Amy Somerville
- Edward Ellis as Old Ike
- Dorothy Burgess as Lulu Stevenson
- Donald Meek as Charlie
- Andy Clyde as Storekeeper
- Guinn 'Big Boy' Williams as Ben Roberts
- Ray Mayer as Gabby
- T. Roy Barnes as Gozzy Smith
- DeWitt Jennings as Sheriff Ramsey
