= Pardon My French (1951 film) =

1951 film by Bernard Vorhaus

- Directed by: Bernard Vorhaus
- Starring: Paul Henreid; Merle Oberon; Paul Bonifas
- Music by: Henri Taverna
- Production companies: Cusick Films; Jupiter Films
- Distributed by: United Artists
- Release dates: August 10, 1951; August 29, 1952 (New York)
- Running time: 82 minutes
- Countries: France; United States
- Language: English

Pardon My French (released as The Lady from Boston in the United Kingdom) is a 1951 American-French coproduction comedy film directed by Bernard Vorhaus and starring Paul Henreid, Merle Oberon and Paul Bonifas. A French-language version released as Dans la vie tout s'arrange was filmed alongside the English-language version.

== Plot ==
A Boston schoolteacher inherits a chateau in France, but on arriving to take command of the property, she discovers that it is inhabited by squatters.

== Cast ==
- Paul Henreid as Paul Rencourt
- Merle Oberon as Elizabeth Rockwell
- Paul Bonifas as Monsieur Bleubois
- Maximilienne as Madame Bleubois
- Jim Gérald as Monsieur Poisson
- Alexandre Rignault as Rondeau
- Martial Rèbe as Mobet
- Dora Doll as Yvette
- Laura Daryl as Mme. Mobet
- Lucien Callamand as Inspector
- Víctor Merenda as François
- Gilberte Defoucault as Marie-Claire
- Marina Vlady as Jacqueline
- Gérard Rosset as Michel
- Albert Cullaz as André
- Nicole Monnin as Marcelle
- André Aversa as Pierrot

== Production ==
The film project was conceived as an American, French and British coproduction, the first of a partnership formed by American Peter Cusick, Frenchman André Sarrut and Englishman Christopher Mackintosh, but only Cusick and Sarrut are listed as the producers in the final film. It was filmed exclusively in the south of France at the Château de Castellaras in Mouans-Sartoux, five miles inland from Cannes. No studio filming occurred because the producers felt that the natural French provincial setting would enhance the American style of romantic comedy. Because of the lack of skilled film technicians and facilities in the area, the crew of 85 and most of the props were imported from cities such as London and Paris. An assembly of 300 extras was composed of people recruited from the streets and cafés along the French Riviera, some of whom were afforded minor speaking roles.

In his autobiography, Paul Henreid wrote that he became involved with the film to fulfill a commitment to his friend André Sarve, a French producer with whom he served as coproducer.

== Reception ==
In a contemporary review for The New York Times, critic A. H. Weiler wrote: "Although 'Pardon My French' opens with the prospect of Gallic charm and wit and colorful locales, it turns out to be merely a promise. For the romantic comedy ... quickly dissipates a novel and refreshing idea—that of a proper Boston schoolmarm inheriting a Riviera chateau only to find it jammed full of a variety of squatters—and becomes a labored and largely uninspired amorous adventure."
