= Jean Rouverol =

American actress and screenwriter (1916–2017)

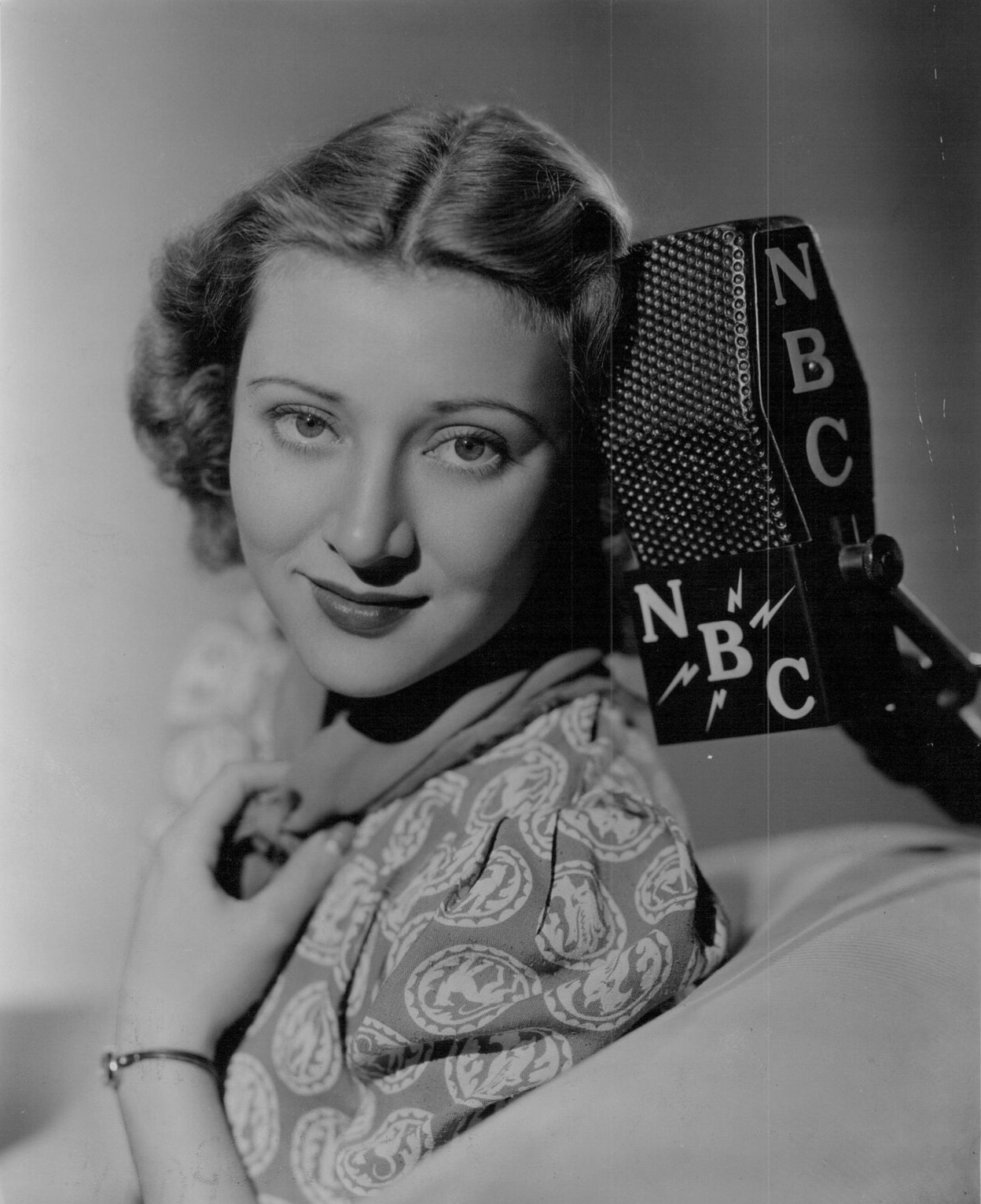
- Rouverol in 1943
- Born: July 8, 1916; St. Louis, Missouri, U.S.
- Died: March 24, 2017 (aged 100); Wingdale, New York, U.S.
- Other name: Jean Rouveral
- Occupations: Actress; screenwriter; author
- Years active: 1934–2009
- Spouse: Hugo Butler (m. 1940; died 1968)
- Children: 6

Jean Rouverol (July 8, 1916 – March 24, 2017) was an American actress, screenwriter and author who was blacklisted by the Hollywood movie studios in the 1950s.

== Life and acting career ==
Rouverol was born in St. Louis, Missouri, the daughter of playwright Aurania Rouverol, who created the Andy Hardy fictional character and co-wrote many of the screenplays for the MGM series of Andy Hardy films.

Rouverol began her acting career on stage. During a break from studying at Stanford, she appeared in Max Reinhardt's A Midsummer Night's Dream at the Hollywood Bowl alongside Mickey Rooney as Puck. She was pulled from the play to appear as W. C. Fields' daughter in the comedy It's a Gift (1934), which was her screen debut. She continued to perform mainly in supporting roles, making another eleven films until 1940 when she married screenwriter Hugo Butler.

With four children coming in quick order, Rouverol did not return to film acting but throughout the 1940s performed on radio, including playing Betty Carter on One Man's Family. While her husband was away serving in the U.S. military during World War II, she tried her hand at fiction, completing a novella which she sold to McCall's magazine in 1945.

== HUAC and exile ==
By 1950, Rouverol had her first screenplay, So Young So Bad, made into a film, but her career was interrupted as a result of the investigations by the House Un-American Activities Committee (HUAC) into Communist influence in Hollywood. In 1943, Rouverol and Hugo Butler had joined the Communist Party USA (CPUSA). When the HUAC attempted to subpoena them in 1951, the Butlers chose exile in Mexico with their four small children rather than face a possible prison sentence as was endured by colleagues in the Hollywood Ten. Branded as subversives, Rouverol and her husband did not return to the U.S. on a permanent basis for thirteen years, during which time they had two more children.

In Mexico, Rouverol wrote short stories and articles for American magazines to earn money. She contributed scripts for the television soap opera Search for Tomorrow. She and her husband co-wrote three screenplays that their agent Ingo Preminger was able to sell to Hollywood studios in spite of the blacklist. Preminger did this by arranging for friends in the Writers Guild of America to act as "fronts", i.e., to put their names on the scripts in place of Rouverol and Butler.

In 1960, the Butlers moved to Rome so that Hugo could work on a script for director Robert Aldrich which became the 1962 film Sodom and Gomorrah. In 1964, the family relocated to the U.S. for good after a brief stay in Mexico. Living in California again, Rouverol and her husband resumed their screenplay collaboration although by this time, he had become ill with arteriosclerotic brain disease. He died in January 1968, after they had co-written The Legend of Lylah Clare (1968).

== Later writing success ==
In 1968, Rouverol published her first book, Harriet Beecher Stowe: Woman Crusader. In the early 1970s, she authored three more books in three years, including biographies of Pancho Villa and Benito Juárez. She then turned her attention to TV writing. She worked for over a year on the daytime drama Bright Promise. She wrote a 1974 episode of Little House on the Prairie. She was hired as co-head writer of the CBS soap opera Guiding Light for which she received a Daytime Emmy nomination and a Writers Guild of America Award. She also contributed scripts for the soap operas As the World Turns and Bright Promise. Her book Writing for the Soaps was published in 1984. She taught writing classes at the University of Southern California and at UCLA Extension.

Rouverol served four terms on the board of directors of the Writers Guild of America, and in 1987 she received the Guild's Morgan Cox Award as a member "whose vital ideas, continuing efforts and personal sacrifice" best exemplified the ideal of service to the Guild. In January 2001, Rouverol (aged 84) published a memoir, Refugees from Hollywood: A Journal of the Blacklist Years, which told the story of her family's life in exile during the blacklist.

== Death ==
In her later years, Rouverol lived with actor Cliff Carpenter, who was another former blacklistee. Carpenter died on January 9, 2014, at the age of 98.

Rouverol died on March 24, 2017, at the age of 100.

== Filmography ==
Year	Title	Role	Notes
1934	It's a Gift	Mildred Bissonette	
1935	Private Worlds	Carrie Flint	
1935	Mississippi	Lucy's schoolgirl friend	Uncredited
1935	Bar 20 Rides Again	Margaret Arnold	
1936	The Leavenworth Case	Eleanore Leavenworth	
1936	Fatal Lady	Anita	
1937	The Road Back	Elsa	
1937	Stage Door	Dizzy	
1938	Annabel Takes a Tour	Laura Hampton	
1938	The Law West of Tombstone	Nitta Moseby	
1938	Western Jamboree	Betty Haskell	

== Screenplays ==
- So Young So Bad (1950)
- The First Time (1952; uncredited)
- Autumn Leaves (1956; front Jack Jevne)
- The Miracle (1959; originally uncredited)
- Face in the Rain (1963)
- The Legend of Lylah Clare (1968)

== Books ==
- Harriet Beecher Stowe: Woman Crusader. Putnam. 1968. LCCN 68024544.
- Pancho Villa: A Biography. Doubleday. 1972. ISBN 978-0385006385.
- Juárez, A Son of the People. Crowell-Collier Press. 1973. LCCN 72081071.
- Storm Wind Rising. Fawcett Gold Medal. 1974. ISBN 978-0449030325.
- Writing for the Soaps. Writer's Digest Books. 1984. ISBN 978-0898791464.
- Refugees from Hollywood: A Journal of the Blacklist Years. University of New Mexico Press. 2001. ISBN 978-0826322661.
