= Two Fathers (film) =

- Directed by: Anthony Asquith
- Written by: Anthony Asquith; V.S. Pritchett
- Produced by: Arthur Elton
- Starring: Bernard Miles; Paul Bonifas
- Cinematography: Jonah Jones
- Music by: Clifton Parker
- Distributed by: Crown Film Unit
- Release date: 1944
- Running time: 13 minutes
- Country: United Kingdom
- Language: English

Two Fathers (also known as 2 Fathers) is a 1944 British wartime propaganda short film directed by Anthony Asquith and made by the Crown Film Unit, a division of the Ministry of Information. It was written by Asquith and V.S. Pritchett.

== Plot ==
An Englishman and a Frenchman find themselves sharing a room in a hotel in an unidentified English location, and fall into conversation. The Englishman's son is in the Royal Air Force, and when the Frenchman shows him a photograph of his daughter, the Englishman remarks that it is less worrisome to have a daughter than a son at this time of war. The Frenchman replies that his daughter, a nurse by profession, is currently an active member of the Maquis. The Englishman says that he has received news that his son was forced to bail out of his plane over France the previous day, and the Frenchman observes that there are many thousands of French men and women who will risk their own safety to help a downed British airman.

== Cast ==
- Bernard Miles as the Englishman
- Paul Bonifas as the Frenchman
- Paulette Preney as the girl
- Margaret Yarde
- Arthur Young
- Everley Gregg
- David Keir
