= The King and the Mockingbird =

French animated film

- Theatrical release poster
- Directed by: Paul Grimault
- Screenplay by: Paul Grimault; Jacques Prévert (incl. dialogue)
- Based on: "The Shepherdess and the Chimney Sweep" by Hans Christian Andersen
- Produced by: André Sarrut (1952); Robert Dorfmann (1980)
- Starring: Jean Martin; Pascal Mazzotti; Raymond Bussières; Agnès Viala
- Cinematography: Gérard Soirant
- Edited by: Gilbert Natot (1952); Paul Grimault (1980)
- Music by: Joseph Kosma (1952); Wojciech Kilar (1980)
- Production companies: Les Films Paul Grimault; Les Films Gibé; Antenne 2
- Distributed by: Gaumont Distribution
- Release dates: September 1952 (Venice); 19 March 1980
- Running time: 63 minutes (1952); 87 minutes (1980); 84 minutes (2003)
- Country: France
- Language: French

The King and the Mockingbird (French: Le Roi et l'Oiseau, lit. 'The King and the Bird') is an animated fantasy film directed by Paul Grimault. Prior to 2013, it was released in English as The King and Mister Bird.

Begun in 1948 as La Bergère et le Ramoneur (lit. "The shepherdess and the chimney sweep", loosely based on the fairy-tale of the same name by Hans Christian Andersen), the film was a collaboration between Grimault and popular French poet and screenwriter Jacques Prévert. However, the film suddenly stopped production and was released unfinished by its producer in 1952, without the approval of either Grimault or Prévert. Through the course of the 1960s and 1970s, Grimault obtained the rights to the film and was able to complete a new version as they originally intended. The film was completed over 30 years after production commenced.

The film is today regarded as a masterpiece of French animation and has been cited by the Japanese directors Hayao Miyazaki and Isao Takahata as an influence. It was released in the United Kingdom dubbed into English in cinemas in 1984 and subsequently on VHS, but then had poor availability in English until 2014. After being re-released in France in 2013, it was re-released in cinemas in the United Kingdom, and the first English-friendly DVD release was made there in April 2014.

While the completed version has not been released on home video in North America, it was available for streaming on The Criterion Channel.

A low-budget English-language release of the 1952 version, titled The Curious Adventures of Mr. Wonderbird, is in the public domain and available free online. In that version, Peter Ustinov narrates and voices the main role of the bird.

== Plot ==
The Curious Adventures of Mr. Wonderbird

The huge kingdom of Takicardia is ruled by a king under the unwieldy title of Charles V + III = VIII + VIII = XVI. He is a heartless ruler, hated by his people as much as he hates them. The King is fond of hunting, but is unfortunately cross-eyed – not that anyone would dare acknowledge this in front of him, as the numerous statues and paintings that adorn the palace and the land show him with regular eyes. Occasionally, the King does hit his target, though; notably, the wife of the bird. The bird, known only as l'Oiseau, is the narrator of the story and takes pleasure in taunting the king at every opportunity.

In his secret apartment, the King dreams of the beautiful shepherdess whose painting he keeps on his wall, but the shepherdess is in love with the chimney sweep whose hated portrait is on the opposite wall. At night, the paintings come to life and attempt to escape from the palace, but are pursued by a non-cross-eyed painting of the king that also has come to life. He deposes the real king, takes his place, and orders the capture of the shepherdess and the sweep, but the bird is there to help when called upon.

Later, the shepherdess and the chimney sweep find themselves in the lower city, where the inhabitants have never seen the light. Meanwhile, the King summons a robot built for him, and he attacks the village. He takes the shepherdess and captures the chimney sweep, the bird, and a blind organ-grinder from the village, putting the organ-grinder in a pen of lions and tigers. The King forces the shepherdess to agree to marry him, threatening to kill the chimney sweep if she does not accept. When she does, the King sends the chimney sweep and the bird to paint manufactured sculptures of his head on a conveyor belt. They begin to ruin the sculptures, and are sent to jail, where the lions and tigers have been listening to the organ-grinder playing. The bird convinces them to help the shepherdess, saying that her marriage to the King prevents her from tending to the sheep, which the animals eat. The animals break out of the jail and attack the interviewers and king in the chapel. The bird and his sons take control of the robot and start destroying the castle. Once the castle is in rubble, the King attacks the couple, but the robot grabs him and blows him into the distance. Sitting on the ruins of the castle the next morning, the robot sees one of the bird's sons trapped in a cage. After freeing the bird, the robot smashes the cage.

=== Variations ===
Only the early scene in the secret apartment is based on "The Shepherdess and the Chimney Sweep", while the rest of the movie focuses much more on the king and the bird, hence the ultimate title. In Andersen's tale, the shepherdess and the chimney sweep are china figurines, rather than paintings, and a wooden (mahogany) satyr wishes to wed the shepherdess, supported by a Chinaman, rather than a king and a classical statue. In both tales, the Chinaman/statue breaks, and the duo escape up the chimney, and delight in celestial bodies, but in Andersen's tale the shepherdess is afraid of the wide world and the duo return; this is echoed in the movie where the statue predicts that they will return.

The 1952 film ends with the bird taking a photo of the newly-wed shepherdess and chimney sweep along with the king's dog, all of the bird's sons, and others after the king is vanquished.

== Cast ==
Character	Original		English	
Character	1952 version	1980 version	1952 version	1980 version
The Bird/Mr. Wonderbird	Pierre Brasseur	Jean Martin	Peter Ustinov	Steve Gadler
King Charles V + III = VIII + VIII = XVI/The King	Fernand Ledoux	Pascal Mazzotti	Max Adrian	Jerry Di Giacomo
The Shepherdess	Anouk Aimée	Agnès Viala	Claire Bloom	Patricia Kessler
The Chimney Sweep	Serge Reggiani	Renaud Marx	Denholm Elliott	Unknown
The Chief of Police/The Policeman	Yves Deniaud	Raymond Bussieres	Philip Stainton	Billy Kearns
The Sententious	Félix Oudart	Hubert Deschamps	Cecil Trouncer (The Statue)	Unknown
The High-Howler	Etienne Decroux	Albert Medina		Unknown
The Blind Man	Roger Blin	Roger Blin	Alec Clunes	Unknown
The Elevator Operator & Speaker	Unknown	Philippe Derrez	Billy Kearns	
The Beastmaster	Marcel Pérès	Albert Medina	Jerry Di Giacomo	
The Old Beggar	Maurice Schutz	Harcourt Williams		
The Kitten	N/A	N/A	Joan Heal	Unknown
Mayor of the Palace	Claude Piéplu	Unknown		
The Commentator	Frank Muir			
Museum Security Guard	Thomas Pollard			
Wedding Priest	Allan Wenger			

== Production ==
Originally titled La Bergère et le Ramoneur (lit. "The shepherdess and the chimney sweep"), Grimault and Prévert began the film in 1948 (following their first collaboration, Le Petit soldat, lit. "The little soldier", also a Hans Christian Andersen adaptation), and it was highly anticipated, but in 1950, the film was taken out of their control, and subsequently the expense of the film caused the failure of the studio (Les Gémeaux). Grimault's partner André Sarrut (the producer) then released the film unfinished in 1952, against Grimault and Prévert's wishes, which caused a rift between partners, and they went their separate ways. In 1967, Grimault regained possession of the film, and spent the next decade trying to finance a new version under his supervision. By 1977 he had arranged financing, and thus the film was completed over the two-year period of 1977–79. In 1980 the finished film was finally released under a new title, Le Roi et l'Oiseau – to make clear the distinction from the earlier version – and shortly after the death of Prévert, to whom the film is dedicated.

The completed film uses 42 of the 62 minutes of the 1952 footage, and, at 87 minutes, includes significant new animation, completely different music, and a very different, more symbolic ending. Some footage is cut, such as the bird taking over the role as announcer at the wedding and the original ending. The new footage includes both entirely new scenes, and changes to existing scenes. For example, in the completed film, the initial scenes of the king practicing target shooting and having his portrait painted are new, while the scene of the king shooting at the baby bird, which falls between these two, was from the 1952 footage. The differences between the old and new animation are visible at some points in a single scene, most noticeably in the lion pit, where the lions are drawn in two very different styles; the simpler, more abstract lions are the new animation.

The production of the music is unusual in that Grimault left it entirely in the hands of Wojciech Kilar – Grimault gave no instruction as to what music he desired, nor was there any back-and-forth, but simply shared the movie with Kilar, who studied it carefully, then went to Poland, recorded it, and returned with the completed score, which was accepted unchanged. The score was made available on an album of music from the original soundtrack, but no official sheet music exists. However, Simon Bozonnet, an amateur musician and fan of the film, released a faithful transcription of the piano theme on his website.

== Cultural references ==
The movie is rife with cultural references. Most basically, the castle is similar to 19th century fairy-tale castles, the best known of which is Neuschwanstein Castle, while the best-known such model in France is the medieval town Carcassonne, which notably has a surrounding ville basse (lower city), as in the movie. The city, with its dark, industrial underbelly recalls Metropolis by Fritz Lang, and the enslaved work recalls Modern Times of Charlie Chaplin.

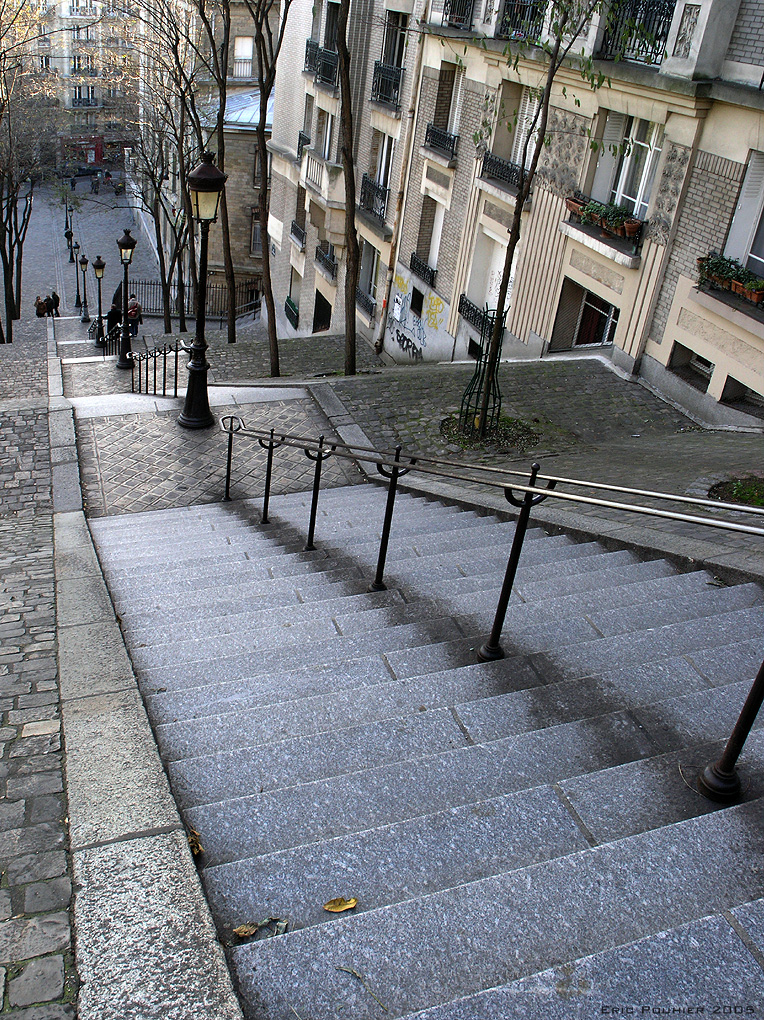
The long staircases in the film recall the walk down the Rue Foyatier in Montmartre, Paris

The castle, presiding over a city, has been compared to a "Neo-Sacré-Cœur", this basilica being the highest point of Paris, presiding over the city from the top of Montmartre. The visual style is painterly, with strong perspective, recalling surrealist artists, most notably Giorgio de Chirico, but also Yves Tanguy, friend of Prévert's youth. See this article for a sampling of scenes.

There are extensive allusions to Germany, particularly connections between the king and Adolf Hitler, most obviously in the king's appearance on leaving water (mustache and hair strongly resembling Hitler's) and in the cult of personality, but also in the king's statement that "work…is liberty", alluding to the infamous "Arbeit macht frei" (work sets you free), written over the entrances to concentration camps, and also the iconic Stahlhelm (steel helmets) seen in places.

The king's number alludes to Louis XVI, though visually the film recalls more the "Sun King" Louis XIV, and parts of the castle resemble Venice, with the canals, gondola, and Bridge of Sighs. The mustached, bowler-hatted police recall Thomson and Thompson (Dupont et Dupond) from The Adventures of Tintin.

The robot's behavior recalls King Kong, notably both in his chest-pounding and in his waving off the circling bird. He also rests in the figure of The Thinker, by Auguste Rodin.

Some potentially unfamiliar phrases and concepts used in the movie include lettres de cachet, gallows birds (gibier de potence), lèse-majesté (Contempt of the Sovereign), and the Mayor of the Palace. The bird also mentions having seen Les Cloches de Corneville, having been to the Place d'Italie, and having attended the Neuilly festival (Neuilly-sur-Seine is the birthplace of both Prévert and Grimault). It also mentions dernières cartouches (Last Cartridges) which alludes to an episode in the Franco-Prussian War involving the Blue Division of the French marines, memorialized in a painting by that name by Alphonse-Marie-Adolphe de Neuville.

Others see connection with Ubu Roi (King Ubu) of Alfred Jarry, Giovanni Battista Piranesi, and Magritte.

Grimault details some of the specific inspirations: for example, the bird was inspired by Jean Mollet (secretary of Guillaume Apollinaire) and by actor Pierre Brasseur, playing the character of Robert Macaire (via the character Frédérick Lemaître) in Les Enfants du paradis.

=== Connections with other works ===
In the context of the principal authors' other works, it is notable that this is not the only Andersen adaptation that this pair animated – Grimault and Prévert also adapted "The Steadfast Tin Soldier" as Le Petit Soldat (The Little Soldier) (1947), which is included in La Table tournante ("The turning table") on the deluxe edition of The King and the Mockingbird. In the early 1970s, Prévert and Grimault also made two dark animations, one apocalyptic – Le Chien mélomane (The Melomaniac Dog) (1973), which features a dog wielding a violin that caused destruction at a distance and leaves the world a gray waste (as in the end of Le Roi); both are collected in La Table tournante.

Grimault did not directly reuse characters between his animations, but similar characters recur – the twin police officers in Voleur de paratonnerres ("The lightning rod thief") are recalled by Le Sir de Massouf in La Flûte magique ("The magic flute"), then reappears as the chief of police in The King and the Mockingbird. Similarly, Gô from Passagers de La Grande Ourse ("Passengers of The Great Bear) is recalled by Niglo in Marchand de notes, then becomes the chimney sweep in The King and the Mockingbird.

For Prévert's part, he had previously written a poem about the Neuilly festival, mentioned by the bird ("La Fête à Neuilly", in Histoires, 1946), featuring lions, and a lion character features prominently in Children of Paradise, as do other bombastic characters, recalling and in fact inspiring the bird. He also wrote of birds in "Pour faire le portrait d'un oiseau" (To make [paint] a portrait of a bird) in Paroles (1945), which, fittingly, given the long production of the movie, includes the lines "Parfois l'oiseau arrive vite / mais il peut aussi bien mettre de longues années / avant de se décider" (Often the bird arrives quickly / but he can also take many years / before he decides himself).

== Reception and legacy ==
The King and the Mockingbird has been called one of the greatest animated films produced in France.

The film had a profound influence on Hayao Miyazaki and Isao Takahata, who later founded Studio Ghibli. Miyazaki states, inter alia, that "We were formed by the films and filmmakers of the 1950s. At that time I started watching a lot of films. One filmmaker who really influenced me was the French animator Paul Grimault." and "It was through watching Le Roi et l'Oiseau by Paul Grimault that I understood how it was necessary to use space in a vertical manner." For his part, Takahata states "My admiration towards Paul Grimault and Le Roi et l'Oiseau has always been the same, probably because he achieved better than anyone else a union between literature and animation." The influence is also visible in The Castle of Cagliostro, whose castle resembles the castle in The King and the Mockingbird. They discuss this at length in a documentary on the deluxe edition of the Japanese DVD, noting for example that they took frame-by-frame photographs of some sequences (such as the king elbowing the court painter aside) to be able to study how the animation was done. The film would be dubbed into Japanese for the release and star the voice of Gorō Naya, the voice of Koichi Zenigata, who had reprised his role for The Castle of Cagliostro.

It was also officially selected for the 2014 New York Film Festival.

== Editions ==
The King and the Mockingbird has been released in various editions, in various languages. Beyond the fundamental distinction between editions based on the incomplete 1952 version and the 1980 version, the film has been dubbed in many languages, including Japanese and Dutch.

In 1957, the 1952 version of the film was released in the United States and given an English-dubbed soundtrack under the title of The Adventures of Mr. Wonderbird. Peter Ustinov narrates and provides the voice of the bird in this version. Since then, the Mr. Wonderbird version is now in the public domain and has been released as bargain video releases. Adventures of Mr. Wonderful was another name given to this version among many of its releases. Now Mr. Wonderbird is available for free online on the Internet Archive.

The 1980 version of the film was also dubbed into English with a cast of France-based American voice actors, and released in the United Kingdom in 1984, in cinemas under the title The King and Mister Bird by the Institute of Contemporary Arts and on VHS under the title Mr Bird to the Rescue by Entertainment in Video.

A Japanese-subtitled DVD version, titled Ō to Tori (王と鳥), is available through Ghibli Museum Library, and went on sale 4 April 2007, following a theatrical release in Japan starting 29 July 2006.

In 2013, the 2003 digital restoration of the film was re-released in French cinemas in the summer, this time as a Digital Cinema Package, by Sophie Dulac Distribution. It was then released on DVD in Germany on September 5 and in France in both a standard DVD edition, a Blu-ray Disc edition, and a collector's box set on October 15.

The French deluxe version Blu-ray Disc and DVD includes a collection of Grimault's shorts and a 1988 documentary of Grimault and his work, La Table tournante, ("The turning table"), filmed by Jacques Demy, together with various shorts.

It was re-released as a DCP in cinemas in the United Kingdom on April 11, 2014 by the Independent Cinema Office, both in French with English subtitles and in the King and Mister Bird dub, and on DVD with English subtitles and this dub, for the first time in both cases, on April 28, 2014. Previously, it was not available in the English-speaking world except by import of the French, Japanese and German editions. Although the film does not contain a lot of dialogue, fan-created English subtitles for the completed 1980 edition are available at this page at Open Subtitles. Rialto Pictures released the film in select theaters in the United States and Lionsgate made it available on Amazon Prime Video and on Vudu.

== See also ==
- History of French animation
- List of animated feature films

=== Other animated films with long production histories ===
- The Thief and the Cobbler, in production 1964–1993, released unfinished (or rather, hastily finished).
- The Overcoat, by Yuri Norstein, still in production, since 1981.
- Hoffmaniada, in production 2001-2018.
