= Joan of Paris =

1942 film by Robert Stevenson

- Directed by: Robert Stevenson; James Anderson (assistant)
- Written by: Jacques Théry (story); Georges Kessel (story); Charles Bennett; Ellis St. Joseph
- Produced by: David Hempstead
- Starring: Michèle Morgan; Paul Henreid; Thomas Mitchell; Laird Cregar
- Cinematography: Russell Metty
- Edited by: Sherman Todd
- Music by: Roy Webb
- Production company: RKO Radio Pictures
- Distributed by: RKO Radio Pictures
- Release dates: February 20, 1942 (U.S.); January 23, 1942 (Premiere-New York City)
- Running time: 91 minutes
- Country: United States
- Language: English
- Budget: $666,000
- Box office: $1,150,000

Joan of Paris is a 1942 war film about five Royal Air Force pilots shot down over Nazi-occupied France during World War II and their attempt to escape to England. It stars Michèle Morgan and Paul Henreid, with Thomas Mitchell, Laird Cregar and May Robson in her last role.

Joan of Paris marked the U.S. screen debuts of Austrian Henreid and Frenchwoman Morgan. Henreid had previously appeared in some British-American co-productions made in England and had starred on Broadway in the play Flight to the West as Paul von Hernreid. When he was signed with RKO in 1942, the studio changed his surname, dropping the "von" and changing his last name to "Henreid", the name he used for the rest of his film career.

Cregar was borrowed from 20th-Century Fox. Alan Ladd, who played one of the downed airmen, was about to become a star. After his breakthrough starring role in This Gun for Hire (1942), Joan of Paris was re-released with Ladd more prominently featured.

== Plot ==
1941. In German-occupied France, five downed RAF fliers make their way to Paris to seek help returning to England. Their leader, Paul (Paul Henreid), contacts a former mentor, Father Antoine (Thomas Mitchell), who agrees to hide them in his cathedral. Later, after eluding German agents, Paul enters a café. There, he meets with Joan (Michèle Morgan), introducing himself with a coded message from Father Antoine. As the film progresses, the two become close.

Later, Father Antoine obtains the name of a contact, a schoolteacher (May Robson) who agrees to a secret meeting with Joan, where she promises to arrange for a seaplane to land at night on the Seine River to pick up Paul and the fliers. However, Paul is subsequently arrested by the Gestapo for not carrying identification papers. But his interrogator, Herr Funk (Laird Cregar), apologizes for the inconvenience and releases him. Funk actually wishes to lull Paul into leading his agents to the other fliers. But that night, Paul discovers he is being followed.

Unable to shake his Gestapo tail, he enlists Joan to deliver a map of the rendezvous point to his comrades, still hidden in the cathedral. Later, Paul eliminates his Gestapo tracker. But soon after, Joan is confronted by Herr Funk in her flat. He offers her a devil's bargain: Paul's life, if she will expose the others' hiding place.. She agrees. Once in the cathedral, however, she double-crosses Funk and his soldiers, leading them on a chase through Paris's sewers. Thus, Paul and the fliers are given time to make their escape. Later, Joan bravely faces a German firing squad, giving Father Antoine a message for Paul, that she wanted to live for him. “You will live,” he tells her, “in the heart of France, when she is risen again.”

== Cast ==
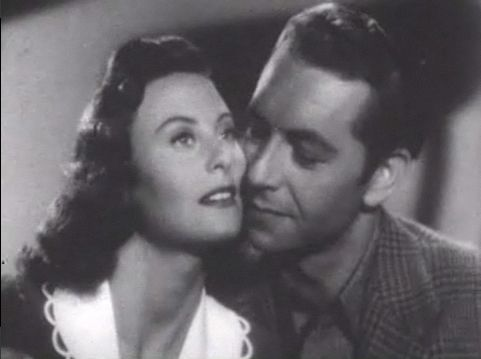
Michèle Morgan and Paul Henreid

- Michèle Morgan as Joan
- Paul Henreid as Paul Lavallier
- Thomas Mitchell as Father Antoine
- Laird Cregar as Herr Funk
- May Robson as Mademoiselle Rosay
- Alexander Granach as Gestapo Agent
- Alan Ladd as Baby
- Jack Briggs as Robin
- James Monks as Splinter
- Richard Fraser as Geoffrey

== Production ==
The working title of this film was "Joan of Arc" and was the first war-themed film from RKO Radio Pictures. According to pre-production news items in The Hollywood Reporter, RKO considered Charles Boyer, Robert Morley and Jean Gabin for leads in the film. Producer David Hempstead wanted Julien Duvivier to direct the project because Gabin and Michele Morgan had worked with Duvivier in Europe. Lewis Milestone was initially assigned to direct the film but resigned over differences with the studio.

Charles Bennett said the original script was done by Ellis St. Joseph '"but his screenplay wasn't very good. And it made me sad, because I thought he was a hell of a good writer. But it didn't work, so they called me in."

Joan of Paris used the largest single set constructed by the studio since the making of Hunchback of Notre Dame (1939). Principal photography took place from mid-September to late October 1941, and although ready for release in December 1941, RKO held the film back for an early 1942 release to capitalize on public interest in the aftermath of the December 7, 1941 Japanese attack on Pearl Harbor and the United States' entry into World War II.

Bennett says Alan Ladd was suggested to Bennett at a party by Ladd's agent and manager, Sue Carol, who soon became Ladd's wife. The writer recalled, "I said to him, 'Do you think you could play an English part?' He said, 'Of course I could!' So he acted in front of me at this cocktail party, and I thought, "Yes! This is it, this is it.'" Bennett introduced Ladd to the producer and director and he was cast. Ladd's performance helped him get cast in This Gun for Hire. Paul Henreid says that after working with Ladd he felt "Ladd couldn't die properly and Stevenson shot and reshot the episode. Ladd's eyes showed no expression. They were like glass balls no matter how much Stevenson worked on him." Henreid says he and Stevenson both predicted that out of the young men in the film it would be Dick Frazier who had the best chance of stardom.

== Reception ==
=== Critical ===
Joan of Paris received a glowing review from film critic Bosley Crowther in The New York Times: "Here is a tale of personal valor and selfless sacrifice which is told so simply and eloquently, and is so beautifully played that it might be a true re-enactment of a gallant episode. At least, it cheers the heart and stirs the pulse to think that it might be. "Joan of Paris" is a rigidly exciting and tenderly moving film. It will do as a tribute to high courage until the lamps of Paris burn once more." Though the comparison is never explicitly made, both the film's name and the protagonist's tragic heroic end strongly suggest that she is a kind of modern incarnation of Joan of Arc.

=== Box office ===
Joan of Paris made a profit of $105,000, making it RKO's most successful film of the first half of 1942.

=== On Television ===
During the mid-1950s, Joan of Paris was part of the C & C Television Corporation package, encompassing nearly the entire RKO library, which was syndicated to independent television stations and network affiliates. Four decades later, the rights to televise these RKO classics were purchased by media mogul Ted Turner for his TCM cable channel as well as distribution on DVD. In TCM's showing of Joan of Paris, as the main character Joan is about to be executed, she whispers “Tally ho, Paul.” This was the pilots' rallying cry throughout the film. Unfortunately, TCM's closed-captioned subtitles mutilated its symbolical meaning, altering Joan's last words to read, “Tally long.”

== Accolades ==
Roy Webb was nominated for the Academy Award for Best Original Score.
