= André Sarrut =

French film producer

André Sarrut (born July 10, 1910 in Gagny, died June 13, 1997 in Paris) was a French animation film producer. Sarrut founded the first European hand-drawn animation film company, Les Gémeaux in 1936 with Paul Grimault as artistic director. After producing several short films, including Le Voleur de paratonnerres (The Lightning Rod Thief) and Le Petit Soldat (Little Soldier), Les Gémeaux began work on a feature film based on Hans Christian Andersen's fairy tale, The Shepherdess and the Chimney Sweep.

Les Gémeaux's hand-drawn animated films were described as having touches of wit and fantasy. Their film company sought to compete with Hollywood imports, such as Walt Disney's golden age of American animation films. He was described as a "little dynamo of a man".

In 1945, Sarrut founded the company Safia, which became Sagitta-Films in 1947. There, he notably produced Henri Decoin's La Fille du diable (The Devil's Daughter) (1945) and Jean Gehret's Le Café du cadran (1946).

In 1951, Sarrut founded the advertising film company La Comète, where he produced numerous commercials with Jacques Asséo as the animator. During the 1950s, advertising agency budgets grew considerably, leading La Comète to produce over two thousand commercials, thus becoming the largest advertising company in Europe, with 80% of its output exported.

== Filmography ==
- Le marchand de notes
- Passengers on the Big Bear (1943)
- The Scarecrow (1943)
- Le Crime de Justes (1948)
- Tabusse (1948)
- Wicked City (1949)
- The King and the Mockingbird (1952)
- Pardon My French (1951)
- Tabusse (1949)
- Le crime des justes (1950)
- Transatlantic (1953)
- La femme et le fauve (1955)
- La Bergère et la Ramoneur (The Shepherdess and the Chimneysweep)
