= So Young, So Bad =

1950 American film by Bernard Vorhaus

- Theatrical poster (1950)
- Directed by: Bernard Vorhaus
- Written by: Jean Rouverol (story); Bernard Vorhaus (story)
- Produced by: Edward J. Danziger; Harry Lee Danziger
- Starring: Paul Henreid; Catherine McLeod; Anne Francis
- Cinematography: Don Malkames
- Edited by: Carl Lerner
- Music by: Robert W. Stringer
- Production company: Danziger Productions
- Distributed by: United Artists
- Release date: May 20, 1950 (United States)
- Running time: 91 minutes
- Country: United States
- Language: English
- Budget: $550,000

So Young, So Bad is a 1950 American drama film. It stars Paul Henreid, and was directed by Bernard Vorhaus.

It was the first major screen role for Anne Francis, Rita Moreno, and Anne Jackson.

== Plot ==
Three girls flee from Elmview Corrective School for Girls, a reform school. Two manage to steal a truck and escape while the third hides nearby. The next day, Dr. John Jason, a psychiatrist on staff, is told to resign by Riggs, the chief of staff. Dr. Jason refuses, and an investigation in the psychiatrist's methods is begun. Dr. Jason reflects on the circumstances leading up to this day, and the scene changes to his arrival at Elmview.

Against the wishes of Riggs, Dr. Jason, is hired to reduce the high rate of recidivism at Elmview. He meets several of the new arrivals, and naively recommends treatments for them to Riggs and the other staff, who seem to listen to his advice. Ruth Levering, the assistant superintendent, warns him that his efforts will be futile. When he follows up, and explores the school, Dr. Jason is shocked to discover that not only is his advice not being followed but the girls are forced to work as farm hands and in a sweatshop laundry and are punished with solitary confinement if they refuse. When he complains, Miss Levering, who had seemed sympathetic to the girls, refuses to back him up. Frustrated, Dr. Jason considers resigning, much to the satisfaction of Riggs.

As a passive protest, the girls refuse to sing for the city council when they visit the institution. As punishment, Riggs has Mrs. Beuhler, the cruel head matron, confiscate the girls' belongings. In the process Riggs discovers and Beuhler kills a rabbit the girls had been keeping as a pet. In retaliation the girls set fire to their bedding and the blaze destroys the dormitory. Beuhler reacts by bringing the girls to the basement and setting a fire hose on them.

Meanwhile, Dr. Jason and Miss Levering meet on their day off and she explains that if she had supported him with the staff she would be fired and would then be unable to help the girls at all. Though Dr. Jason disagrees with this approach and an argument ensues, a friendship begins between the two. When they return to Elmview, they manage to rescue the girls from Beuhler. One of the girls, Loretta, a single mother who Dr. Jason tried to help when he first arrived, develops a crush on him as a result.

Threatening to report the fire hose incident to the board of directors, Dr. Jason makes a deal with Riggs where he would stay on in a purely administrative role while Dr. Jason and Miss Levering would make all decisions as to the treatment of the girls. Under the new regime, the harsh punishments are abolished, the farm and the laundry are shut down and replaced by vocational training programs, and a number of other reforms are instituted. The morale and behavior of the girls improves dramatically, though Loretta is jealous of Miss Levering and Dolores, a chronic runaway, still has trouble socializing. Eventually Dr. Jason and Miss Levering arrange a dance, inviting boys from a nearby trade school.

The night of the dance, one of the girls "borrows" a bottle of perfume from Mrs. Beuhler who directs her anger at Dolores by cutting off her hair. The rest of the girls go to the dance leaving Dolores in tears. Loretta, hurt by Dr. Jason's rejection of her at the dance, runs back to the dormitory where she finds Dolores has committed suicide. When Riggs sees the body, he suspends Dr. Jason and Miss Levering and puts Mrs. Beuhler in charge of the school. Fearing a return of harsh conditions, Loretta escapes with two other girls, Jane and Jackie, as seen at the start of the movie.

Dr. Jason, thinking that Dolores had cut off her own hair, blames himself for not realizing she was suicidal. But Jane emerges from hiding and reveals that Beuhler was actually responsible. At a hearing to determine the fate of Elmview, things don't go well. The suicide and runaways are blamed on Jason's methods and Jane and the other girls refuse to corroborate the incidents with the fire hose or the hair cutting. Miss Levering's testimony is discounted because of her relationship with Dr. Jason.

Loretta and Jackie, now fugitives, visit the maternity home where Loretta's baby is living in an attempt to get money. But on spending some time with him, Loretta decides to keep the baby rather than putting him up for adoption. They learn of Jason's predicament and return to Elmview to testify. With Loretta and Jackie there, the other girls also corroborate their harsh treatment by Beuhler, revealing they had been whipped to prevent them from telling the truth, which leads to Riggs and Beuhler being placed under arrest.

In an epilogue, Dr. Jason and Miss Levering, now Mrs. Jason, are running the school, Loretta is paroled and looking forward to raising her son, and many of the other girls leave to lead productive lives.

== Cast ==
- Paul Henreid as Dr. John H. Jason
- Catherine McLeod as Ruth Levering
- Cecil Clovelly as Mr. Riggs
- Grace Coppin as Mrs. Beuhler
- Anne Francis as Loretta
- Anne Jackson as Jackie
- Enid Pulver as Jane
- Rita Moreno as Dolores Guerrero (credited as Rosita Moreno) [Not to be confused with Rosita Moreno, a Spanish actress who was 43 years old at the time.]

== Production ==
Vorhaus received his idea after he read a newspaper article about abuses at a women's reformatory. Vorhaus and writer Jean Rouverol visited several institutions to gather ideas. Studios initially showed interest, but they backed out since Vorhaus and Rouverol's politics made the studios uninterested; both Vorhaus and Rouverol were blacklisted before So Young, So Bad saw release.

Paul Henreid says it was the first film from the Danzinger brothers. Henreid agreed to produce and star though the Danzingers would be credited; Henreid took 50% of the profits.

The film was shot with a very low budget. Filming locations included areas in Connecticut, Manhattan, Yonkers, and Long Island. A Jewish home for blind and elderly people in upstate New York was used to represent the Elmview Corrections School for Girls, a fictional institution.

== Reception ==
Turner Classic Movies described the critical response to So Young, So Bad as "tepid" because independent film-making techniques were not as appreciated in the 1950s as they were in later years. Many critics made jokes out of the title. Some critics accused So Young, So Bad of plagiarizing the similarly themed film, Caged. The two movies were released one day apart. So Young, So Bad profited in the United States and received an international distribution agreement. Henreid, ignoring the warnings of his agent, placed a 50 percent stake in the film. Henreid reported that So Young, So Bad made him more money than any other film of his career.

Henreid wrote "the picture did well and I made more money out of it than of anything I've ever been connected with."
