= Paul Grimault =

French film director and animator (1905–1994)

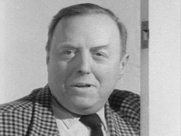
- Grimault in 1961
- Born: 23 March 1905; Neuilly-sur-Seine, Hauts-de-Seine, France
- Died: 29 March 1994 (aged 89); Le Mesnil-Saint-Denis, Yvelines, France
- Occupations: Animator, filmmaker
- Notable work: The King and the Mockingbird

Paul Grimault (French: [pɔl ɡʁimo]; 23 March 1905 – 29 March 1994) was a French animator and filmmaker. He was known for creating traditionally animated films that were delicate in style, satirical, and lyrical.

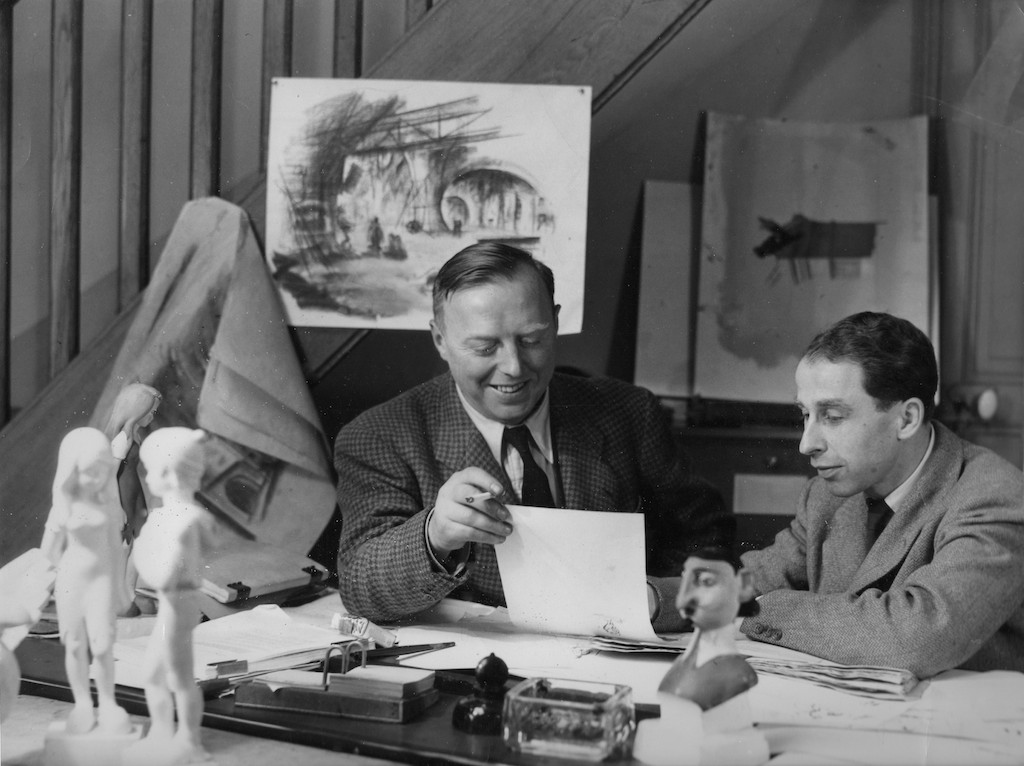
B.Fiévé-Gémeaux 1

His most important work is The King and the Mockingbird (Le Roi et l'Oiseau), which ultimately took over 30 years to produce. He began it as La Bergère et le Ramoneur (The Shepherdess and the Chimney Sweep) in 1948, and it was highly anticipated, but Grimault's partner André Sarrut showed the film unfinished in 1952, against Grimault's wishes. This caused a rift between partners and a stop in production. In 1967, Grimault got possession of the film and subsequently was able to complete it in 1980 under a new title, Le Roi et l'oiseau, incorporating some footage from the original and re-hiring the original animators, together with some new, younger ones. There are many names for it in English that have been used in various releases, including: The King and the Bird (literal), The King and the Mockingbird, The Curious Adventures of Mr. Wonderbird and The King and Mr. Bird (1980).

He also collected his best shorts in a retrospective compilation movie, La table tournante (1988), which is included in the deluxe edition of Le Roi et l'oiseau. For a detailed bibliography, see this reference.

== Les Gémeaux ==
In 1936 Grimault founded, with André Sarrut, Les Gémeaux, which was the second significant French animation venture, following the work of Émile Cohl, which had closed years earlier. During World War II, American films being unavailable, its films found a captive audience. The studio produced a number of shorts, then closed in 1952 following the expense of making La Bergère et le Ramoneur, which was the first feature-length French animated movie.

== Other work ==
Grimault was part of the agitprop group Groupe Octobre. At this group he met Jacques Prévert, with whom he went on to collaborate on several animated films, most notably Le roi et l'oiseau.

== Filmography ==
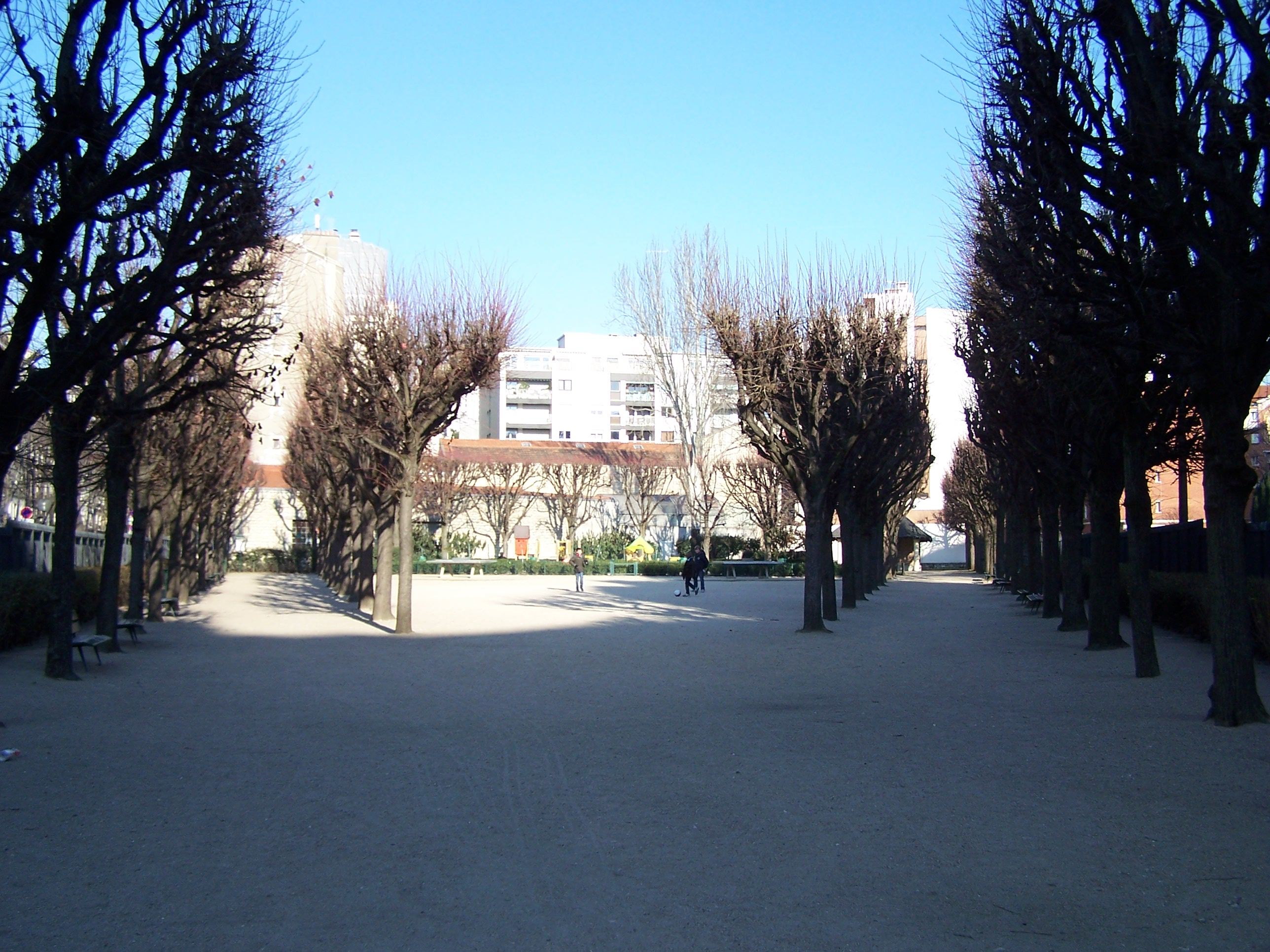
Paul Grimault square, Paris

Grimault's filmography is as follows; those included in the retrospective La table tournante are marked with a star ("*").

Feature length:

- 1952/1953 : La Bergère et le Ramoneur, disowned, incorporated into Le Roi et l'Oiseau
- 1980 : Le Roi et l'Oiseau Received 1979 Louis Delluc Prize in December 1979, released in theaters on 19 March 1980
- 1988 : La Table tournante, with Jacques Demy, collection of shorts

Named after the moving table in La séance de spiritisme (1931), which is the short that begins the collection.

Short:

- Monsieur Pipe fait de la peinture, 1936 (unfinished, film school)
- Les phénomènes électriques, 1937
- Le messager de la lumière, 1938 *
- L'enchanteur est enchanté, 1938
- Les passagers de "La Grande Ourse", 1939–1941 (originally Gô chez les oiseaux (Gô among the birds), 1939)*
- Le marchand de notes, 1942 *
- La Machine à explorer le temps, 1942 (unfinished)
- L’épouvantail, 1943 *
- Le voleur de paratonnerres, 1944 *
- Niglo reporter, 1945 (unfinished)
- La flûte magique, 1946 *
- Le petit Soldat, 1947 * (International prize, Venice Biennial 1948, Grand Prix of the Prague and Rio festivals, 1950)
- La Légende de la soie, 1950 * (short for the silk industry)
- Pierres oubliées, 1952
- Enrico cuisinier, 1956 (mixed with live action, with Pierre Prévert)
- La faim du monde (ou La faim dans le monde), 1957/58 (re-edited version for children, Le Monde en raccourci, 1975)
- Le petit Claus et le grand Claus, 1964
- Le diamant, 1970 * with Jacques Prevert, complement to L'Aveu of Costa-Gavras
- Le chien mélomane, 1973 * with Jacques Prevert
- Le fou du Roi, 1987–1988 * (made for La Table Tournante)

Commercials:

- Le Messenger de la Lumière (The Messenger of Light) – for a light shop
- La Légende de la Soie (The Legend of Silk) – paid for by the silk industry
- Sain et Sauf (Safe and Sound) – for Danon yogurt
- Terre! (Land ho!) – for an optician

Other work:

- La séance de spiritisme (The spiritualist seance) (1931, live action advertisement by Jean Aurenche with stop-action animation by Grimault and Jacques Brunius)
- Two animated TV pilots (Chasseurs pécheurs and Les Sportifs de la Préhistoire), 1970
- Animated sequences projected during the show C'est la guerre, Monsieur Gruber (It's war, Mister Gruber) by Jacques Sternberg, at the Odeon theater, during the Comédie-Française

== Legacy ==
Hayao Miyazaki said he was inspired by Grimault's work.
