= Siren of Bagdad =

1953 film by Richard Quine

- Directed by: Richard Quine
- Written by: Robert E. Kent; Larry Rhine
- Produced by: Sam Katzman
- Starring: Paul Henreid; Patricia Medina; Hans Conried
- Cinematography: Henry Freulich
- Edited by: Jerome Thoms
- Music by: John Leipold
- Distributed by: Columbia Pictures
- Release date: May 20, 1953
- Running time: 73 min.
- Country: United States
- Language: English

Siren of Bagdad is a 1953 Technicolor fantasy adventure film produced by Sam Katzman and directed by Richard Quine set in the medieval Iraq. It stars Paul Henreid as a travelling Master magician who seeks to recover his troop of beautiful dancing girls who are to be sold into slavery. Patricia Medina portrays his love interest who seeks to overthrow the corrupt Grand Vizier with the magician's help. Hans Conried plays the sidekick to Quine's magician, who is transformed into a beautiful blonde woman who spies and distracts the Grand Vizier while retaining Conried's voice.

== Plot ==
Kazah the Great, a magician is traveling in Arabia with a circus.

== Cast ==
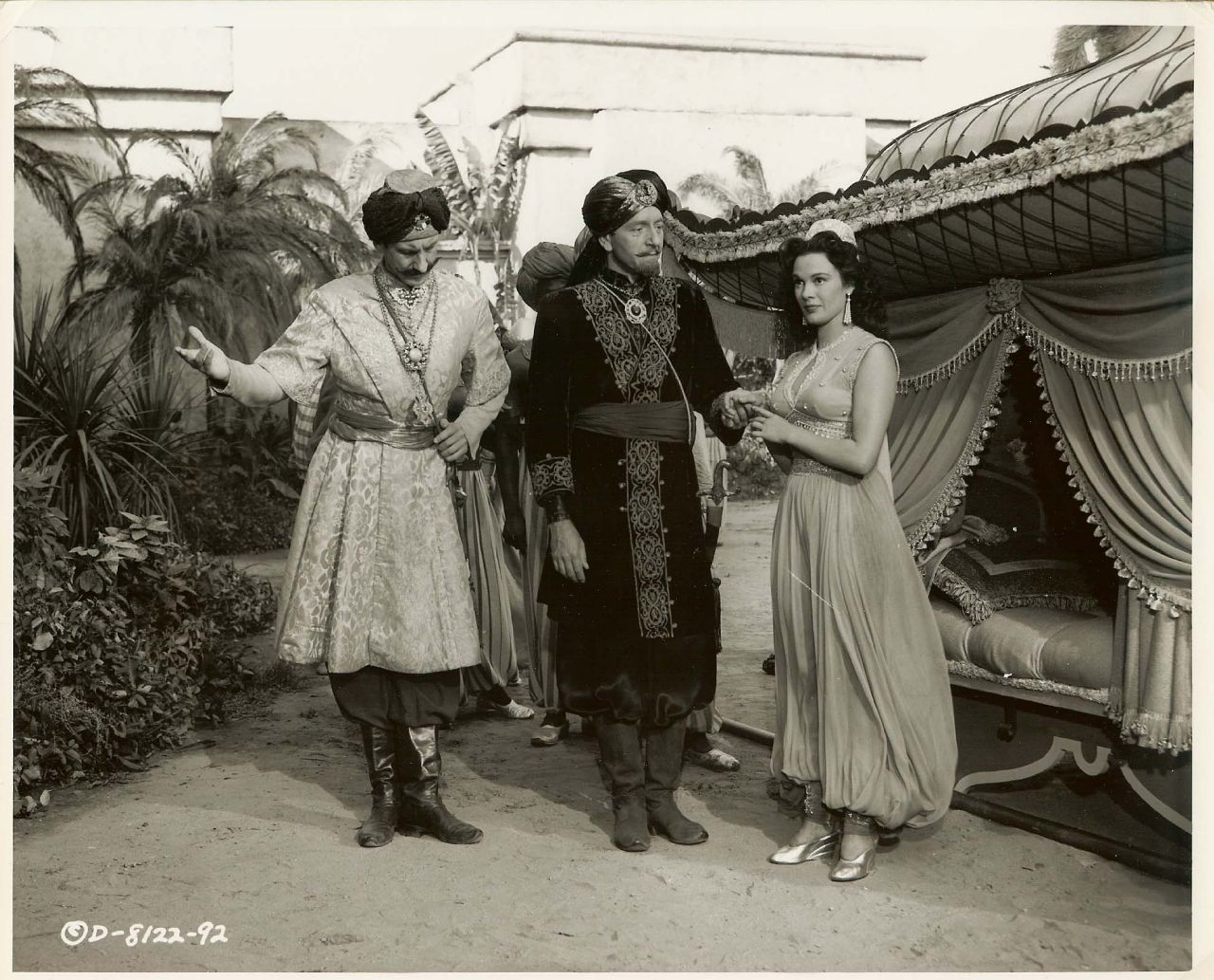
Hans Conried, Paul Henreid and Patricia Medina in Siren of Bagdad

- Paul Henreid as Kazah the Great
- Patricia Medina as Princess Zandi
- Hans Conried as Ben Ali
- Charles Lung as Sultan El Malid
- Laurette Luez as Orena
- Anne Dore as Leda
- George Keymas as Soradin
- Michael Fox as Telar
- Karl Davis as Morab
- Carl Milletaire as Hamid

== Production ==
Patricia Medina signed a three-picture contract with Sam Katzman, of which this was the first.

Filming started 3 September 1952.

It was Henreid's third swashbuckler for Katzman. The actor later recalled that Quine "wanted to do the film as a satire, a Chaplinesque burlesque of pirate films."

== Reception ==
The movie had a successful preview which Henreid said "Every situation joke worked; the audience howled. I came out beaming, and producer Sam Katzman, Quine and I congratulated one another on the very funny picture."

He said Katzman's wife was the only one who did not think the film would be a success, saying "People who go to pirate pictures want just that, a pirate picture. They aren’t as sophisticated as this preview audience. They want their pictures to follow a strict formula. This picture pokes fun at the sacred formula—and I don’t think they’ll accept that." Henreid said "she was absolutely right. The picture was a flop! "

== Comic book adaptation ==
- Eastern Color Movie Love #21 (June 1953)
