= Mantrap (1953 film) =

1953 film by Terence Fisher

- Theatrical release poster
- Directed by: Terence Fisher
- Written by: Paul Tabori; Terence Fisher
- Based on: "Queen in Danger" (novel) by Trevor Dudley-Smith
- Produced by: Michael Carreras; Alexander Paal
- Starring: Paul Henreid; Lois Maxwell; Kieron Moore; Hugh Sinclair; Kay Kendall; Anthony Forwood; Bill Travers
- Cinematography: Reginald H. Wyer; Len Harris
- Edited by: James Needs
- Music by: Doreen Carwithen
- Production company: Hammer Film Productions
- Distributed by: United Artists (USA); Exclusive Films (UK)
- Release date: 16 March 1953 (UK)
- Running time: 78 minutes
- Country: United Kingdom
- Language: English

Mantrap (U.S. title: Man in Hiding) is a 1953 British second feature crime drama directed by Terence Fisher, starring Paul Henreid and Lois Maxwell. It was written by Paul Tabori and Fisher, based on the 1952 novel Queen in Danger by Trevor Dudley-Smith.

== Plot ==
A falsely convicted murderer named Speight (accused of murdering an ex-mistress) escapes prison to seek out the real killer and to clear his name. A private detective named Hugo Bishop agrees to help Speight uncover the real murderer. Speight's ex-wife Thelma works for a publisher named Maurice Jerrard, who has been in love with her for some time. Bishop discovers that it was Jerrard who killed Speight's mistress so that he could frame Speight for the murder and then possibly move in on Speight's wife. Bishop chases Jerrard through the streets of London to the murder scene, where Jerrard falls to his death. Now cleared of the murder charge, Speight moves out of England, Thelma marries a new boyfriend named Victor, and Bishop considers settling down and marrying his secretary Vera Gorringe.

== Cast ==
- Paul Henreid as Hugo Bishop
- Kieron Moore as Speight
- Lois Maxwell as Thelma Speight
- Hugh Sinclair as Maurice Jerrard
- Kay Kendall as Vera Gorringe
- Lloyd Lamble as Inspector Frisnay
- Anthony Forwood as Rex
- Bill Travers as Victor Tasman
- Mary Laura Wood as Susie Martin
- Conrad Phillips as Det. Sgt. Barker
- John Stuart as doctor

== Production ==
The film was made by Hammer Films and shot at the Bray Studios and on location in London, mostly near St Paul's Cathedral.

Paul Henreid previously starred in Stolen Face (1952), also directed by Fisher, for similarly low salary and royalties. He was being somewhat blacklisted in Hollywood at the time, and his career was heading downward.

Camera operator Len Harris started working for Hammer beginning with this film, and later became a major contributor to the legacy of Hammer Films.

Production began on June 16, 1952 and the film was trade shown on March 1, 1953, and released on March 16th.

== Critical reception ==
The Monthly Film Bulletin wrote: "Paul Henreid is suavely smug throughout this thriller, which, although it has its moments of tension, does not succeed because it is too contrived."

The Hollywood Reporter wrote: "Man in Hiding is an implausible murder mystery that does manage to keep one guessing as to the identity of the killer. Unfortunately it also keeps the viewer guessing as to everything else that is happening, resulting in a confusing, over-talky piece with little action to break the lulling effect of all the conversation. ... The screenplay by Paul Tabori and Terence Fisher devotes several lines to defend clichés, evidently to justify the clichés they use consistently. Fisher's direction is slow, using all the hackneyed gimmicks in an effort to build up a suspense that is never realized. Henreid's performance, by pure skill an personality, is much better than the role is written."

In British Sound Films: The Studio Years 1928–1959 David Quinlan rated the film as "mediocre", writing: "Good cast adrift in an archly contrived thriller."

The Radio Times Guide to Films gave the film 2/5 stars, writing: "Paul Henreid, that oily smoothie from Casablanca and Now, Voyager, here washes up in the torrid, tawdry, cheapskate world of the British quota quickie. Lois Maxwell plays a wife who changes her name and begins a new life after her husband is convicted of murder. When he escapes, she goes to private detective Henreid for help."
