= Vampire Circus =

- Theatrical release poster by Vic Fair
- Directed by: Robert Young
- Screenplay by: Judson Kinberg
- Story by: George Baxt; Wilbur Stark
- Produced by: Wilbur Stark
- Starring: Adrienne Corri; Laurence Payne; Thorley Walters; John Moulder-Brown; Anthony Higgins; Lynne Frederick
- Cinematography: Moray Grant
- Edited by: Peter Musgrave
- Music by: David Whitaker
- Production company: Hammer Film Productions
- Distributed by: Rank Film Distributors (United Kingdom); 20th Century Fox (United States)
- Release dates: 30 April 1972 (UK); 15 October 1972 (US)
- Running time: 87 min.
- Country: United Kingdom
- Language: English

Vampire Circus is a 1972 British horror film directed by Robert Young and starring Adrienne Corri, Thorley Walters and Anthony Higgins. It was written by Judson Kinberg, and produced by Wilbur Stark and Michael Carreras (uncredited) for Hammer Film Productions. The story concerns a travelling circus, the vampiric artists of which prey on the children of a 19th-century Serbian village.

== Plot ==
Near the Serbian village of Stetl in the early 1800s, schoolmaster Albert Müller witnesses his wife Anna taking young Jenny Schilt into the castle of reclusive, alleged vampire nobleman Count Mitterhaus. After Mitterhaus feeds on Jenny, Müller directs the village's men to invade the castle and attack Mitterhaus. After Mitterhaus kills several villagers, Müller stabs him with a wooden stake. Mitterhaus vows that Stetl will die to revive him. The villagers force Anna, Mitterhaus' willing acolyte and mistress, to run a gauntlet. When Müller intervenes, she returns to the castle. A briefly revived Mitterhaus directs her to his cousin Emil at "the Circus of Night". After laying his body in the crypt, she escapes through a tunnel as villagers burn the castle.

Fifteen years later, a plague-stricken Stetl is blockaded by authorities of neighbouring towns. The citizens fear that this is Mitterhaus' curse, though physician Kersh dismisses vampires as a myth. A travelling circus called the Circus of Night arrives, directed by dwarf Michael and a Romani woman. Emil, one of the circus artists, and the Romani woman visit the castle's ruins. They find Mitterhaus' preserved body and restate his curse, which the Romani woman questions.

Whilst his son Anton distracts the men at the blockade, Kersh sneaks out to ask the capital for help. Despite his wife Elvira disapproving their daughter Rosa's attraction to Emil, Bürgermeister Peter takes Rosa to the circus. In the hall of mirrors, he sees a vision of Mitterhaus and collapses. Jenny's family try to flee with Michael as their guide, but her father is abandoned in the forest and fatally mauled by Emil, who shapeshifts into a black panther.

Müller's daughter Dora, whom he exiled for her protection, passes the blockade, hoping to reunite with her father and Anton, her lover. She discovers the Schilts' remains, arousing suspicion about the circus' animals. That evening, the Romani woman invites Jon and Gustav Hauser, whose father helped instigate Mitterhaus' murder, into the mirror hall. Twin vampire acrobats Heinrich and Helga lure them to Mitterhaus' crypt, where they are killed and drained. After their bodies are found, their father and Peter shoot the circus animals. After encountering Emil, Peter dies of heart failure. Rosa leaves with Emil. Trying to stop Peter and Hauser, Müller sees the Romani woman's face dissolve into Anna's. Emil leads Rosa to the crypt, kills her, has Mitterhaus drink her blood, and declares that Heinrich and Helga will soon kill Dora.

The twins lure Dora and Anton into the mirror hall and try to whisk Dora through the Mirror of Life, but her cross necklace saves her. The vampires enter the schoolhouse where Dora and Anton have taken refuge. Emil, in panther form, kills the boarding students, diverting Anton. The Romani woman, revealed to be Anna and the mother of the twins, removes Dora's cross, enabling Heinrich and Helga to attack her. Dora escapes into the chapel, where she kills the twins with a giant crucifix. Emil, Anna, and the circus strongman kidnap Dora and her guardian, Hauser's wife Gerta, and take them to Mitterhaus' crypt, intending to use their blood in a ritual to revive Mitterhaus.

Kersh returns with an imperial escort, plague medicines, and news of vampire killings in other villages, all visited by the Circus. The men burn the Circus, killing the strongman when he intervenes. Hauser burns the mirror hall, sees a vision of Emil and Anna bleeding Gerta over Mitterhaus' body, and warns the others before being fatally burned.

In the crypt, a remorseful Anna dies while attempting to save Dora from Emil. Anton arrives and attempts to rescue Dora but is halted by Emil. Müller, Kersh, and a soldier arrive and battle Emil, who bites Müller. Müller pierces him with the stake from Mitterhaus' chest before dying. Mitterhaus rises from his sarcophagus and approaches Dora and Anton. Anton uses Müller's crossbow as a makeshift cross, jams Mitterhaus' neck between the bow and stock, and pulls the trigger, decapitating him. Kersh and the villagers burn the ruins with torches, ending the curse, though a bat flies from the tomb.

== Cast ==
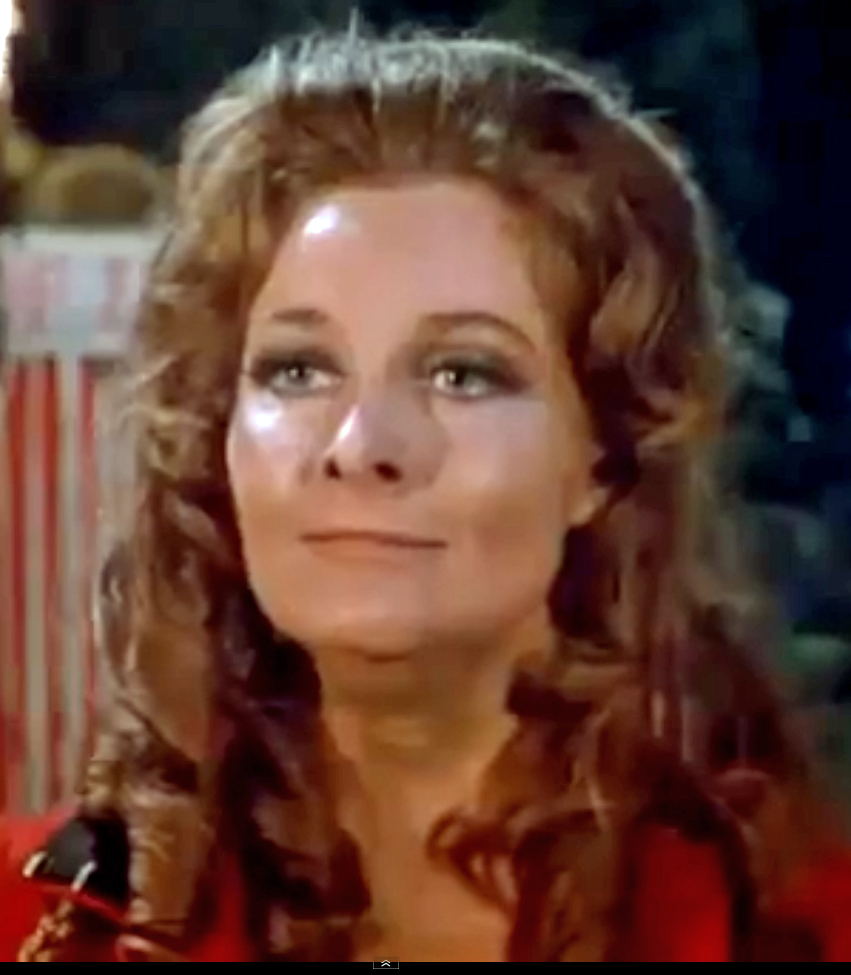
Adrienne Corri in Vampire Circus

- Adrienne Corri as Gypsy Woman
- Laurence Payne as Professor Albert Müller
- Thorley Walters as Peter, the Mayor of Stetl
- Lynne Frederick as Dora Müller
- John Moulder Brown as Anton Kersh
- Elizabeth Seal as Gerta Hauser
- Anthony Higgins as Emil
- Richard Owens as Dr. Kersh
- Domini Blythe as Anna Müller
- Robin Hunter as Mr Hauser
- Robert Tayman as Count Mitterhaus
- Robin Sachs as Heinrich
- Lalla Ward as Helga
- Skip Martin as Michael
- David Prowse as Strongman
- Mary Wimbush as Elvira
- Christina Paul as Rosa
- Roderick Shaw as Jon Hauser
- Barnaby Shaw as Gustav Hauser
- John Bown as Mr Schilt
- Sibylla Kay as Mrs. Schilt
- Jane Darby as Jenny Schilt
- Dorothy Frere as Granma Schilt
- Milovan Vesnitch as Male Dancer
- Serena Weber as tiger-woman erotic dancer
- Sean Hewitt as Soldier
- Giles Phibbs as Sexton
- Jason James as Foreman
- Arnold Locke as Villager
- David de Keyser as the voice of Mitterhaus's curse

== Production ==
George Baxt has said that Hammer paid him £1,000 just for the title and that was his only contribution.

Production began on 9 August 1971 at Pinewood Studios. First-time director Robert Young was unfamiliar with Hammer's tight production schedules, and at one point used up some 500 feet of film stock while trying to get a tiger to sink its teeth into a fake human arm stuffed with pork (it finally bit after beef was substituted). When filming stretched from the scheduled six weeks into seven, the production was shut down and the footage given to editor Peter Musgrave with instructions to make a finished film out of what he had.

== Critical reception ==
On Rotten Tomatoes the film holds an 80% approval rating based on reviews from 5 critics.

Monthly Film Bulletin said "Robert Young – here making his first feature – manages to use the basic situation to establish a delicate fairy tale atmosphere, and he is greatly aided by some unusually restrained performances (from the women in particular). There is a sense of dreamy isolation as the "circus performers gradually take over the imaginative life of the community, isolated from the rest of the world by plague. And certain scenes early in the film (the aerialists changing back and forth into bats before the dumbly applauding villagers, the mirror maze in which victims catch a glimpse of their own deaths) achieve a genuine strangeness. The effect is, however, only fleetingly sustained; and as the plot finally succumbs to formula, the various cross-brandishing climaxes seem unfortunately limp in the context of the earlier part of the film. The struggle between John Moulder Brown and Robert Tayman has none of the elegant panache of the Cushing vs Lee confrontations, while the fashionably overt sexuality of the vampires (who tend to come out with hastily inserted explanations like "'one lust feeds another") proves a real encumbrance to the plot's more intriguing aspects."

AllMovie called the film "one of the studio's more stylish and intelligent projects".

PopMatters also called it "one of the company's last great classics", writing, "erotic, grotesque, chilling, bloody, suspenseful and loaded with doom and gloom atmosphere, this is the kind of experiment in terror that reinvigorates your love of the scary movie artform".

The New York Times film reviewer Howard Thompson dismissed it outright without even the courtesy of a proper review, in favour of its Hammer stablemate Countess Dracula (1971) with which it shared a double bill. His curt review measured two sentences: "Wise horror fans will skip Vampire Circus and settle for Countess Dracula on the new double bill at the Forum. Both are Hammer Productions, England's scream factory, but the first was dealt a quick, careless anvil." before continuing with semi-praise for Countess Dracula.

The Los Angeles Times called the film "a true chiller" with "lots of real-looking teeth, believable gore, and – save for a very lurid ending (not for the kiddies) – a lot of pace, a certain sense of subtlety and a definite, consistent style."

Leslie Halliwell said: "Silly but quite inventive horror thriller." Filmknk called it "nihilistic, full-on and gloriously imaginative, perhaps Hammer’s greatest ‘70s horror, an indication of what happened when the studio backed fresh, exciting talent."

The Radio Times Guide to Films gave the film 3/5 stars, writing: "This isn't the freak show its title might suggest, but a fast-moving, imaginative Hammer vampire tale of punishment and revenge. ... Adrienne Corri's intense beauty shines like a beacon in the murky atmosphere, but the delicacy of mood collapses into blood-spurting horrifics towards the end."

== Novelisation and other media ==
An 'updated' novelisation by Mark Morris was published in 2012.

The film was adapted into a 15-page comic strip titled "Vampire Carnival" for The House of Hammer (vol. 2) #17 (Feb. 1978), drawn by Brian Bolland from a script by Steve Parkhouse. It was reprinted in color in the one-shot Brian Bolland's Black Book in 1985.

== See also ==
- Vampire film
