= Koo Stark =

American film actress and photographer (born 1956)

- Born: Kathleen Norris Stark; April 26, 1956 (age 70); New York City, U.S.
- Occupations: Photographer, model, actress
- Years active: 1974–present
- Spouse: Tim Jeffries (m. 1984; div. 1989)
- Children: 1
- Parents: Wilbur Stark (father); Kathi Norris (mother)

Kathleen Norris "Koo" Stark (born April 26, 1956) is an American photographer and actress, known for her relationship with Andrew Mountbatten-Windsor and her roles in erotic films. She is a patron of the Julia Margaret Cameron Trust, which runs the museum of the Victorian pioneer photographer.

== Early life and education ==
Stark was born in New York. Her parents were Wilbur Stark, a writer and producer, and Kathi Norris, a writer and television presenter in New York City. She is the youngest of three children. At the time of her birth, the family lived in Manhattan. Her grandfather, Edwin Earl Norris, was a cabinetmaker and musician, playing horn and viola in the Newark Symphony Orchestra. Her mother's family were Presbyterians. After a divorce in the 1960s, her mother remarried.

Koo Stark attended the Hewitt School in New York and the Glendower Preparatory School in Kensington, London. After training at a stage school, she began her acting career.

== Career ==
=== Acting ===
Her first film role was in the comedy All I Want Is You... and You... and You... (1974), produced by her father. In 1975 she appeared in Las adolescentes (The Adolescents), opposite Anthony Andrews, and starred in an episode of Shades of Greene. Also that year she had an uncredited role as a bridesmaid in The Rocky Horror Picture Show. Her best-remembered performance is the lead role in the erotic film Emily (1976), directed by Henry Herbert, 17th Earl of Pembroke. Uncertain whether to accept the part, Stark did so on the advice of Graham Greene, with whom she had worked the year before. Of working with her in Emily, actor Victor Spinetti later wrote "I found Koo Stark to be an enchanting girl and terribly bright and interesting".

She also appeared in Cruel Passion (1977), a film based on the novel Justine. Around the same time, she played the part of Camie Marstrap in Star Wars (1977); the scenes in which she appeared were cut from the film before its original release, but can be seen in Star Wars: Behind the Magic (1998).

Stark also began to work as a fashion model, particularly for Norman Parkinson. In February 1981, she was an understudy in the Edward Albee play Who's Afraid of Virginia Woolf? at the National Theatre.

She appeared in the comedy Eat the Rich (1987), and then featured in "Timeslides", an episode of the sci-fi show Red Dwarf (1989), playing Lady Sabrina Mulholland-Jjones, the fiancée of a more successful Dave Lister.

In September 1987, she returned to the stage, taking the part of Vera Claythorne in Agatha Christie's And Then There Were None at the Duke of York's Theatre. The London Theatre Record posed the question "Why has a girl so obviously three-dimensional chosen a part so obviously two-dimensional?" She played Miss Scarlett in the 1991 series of Cluedo, succeeding Toyah Willcox and befriending Rula Lenska.

=== Photography ===
Stark has worked as a photographer since the 1980s, and may have been the first person to turn the tables on the pursuing paparazzi by taking photos of them. Andrew Mountbatten-Windsor has told how in 1983 a photographic printer, Gene Nocon, invited Stark to take photographs of people taking photos of her, for his exhibition, Personal Points of View, planned for October. She persuaded Nocon to include Andrew's work as well. Her early photographs led to a book deal, for which she took lessons from Norman Parkinson. She travelled to Tobago, where he lived, and he became her mentor. Her book Contrasts (1985) included about a hundred of her photographs. She went on to study the work of leading photographers, including Angus McBean, whom she met and photographed, developing her interests in photography to include reportage, portraits, landscapes, still life, and other work.

The book Contrasts was launched at Hamiltons Gallery, London, in September 1985, at an exhibition of the same name. In 1994, the Gallery Bar at the Grosvenor House Hotel in Park Lane hosted an exhibition called 'The Stark Image', forty photographs by Stark, including several previously unpublished. In 1998, her work was featured at the Como Lario in Holbein Place, Belgravia. In July 2001 she had an exhibition called 'Stark Images" at the Fruitmarket Gallery in Edinburgh, duplicated from June to July 2001 at Dimbola Lodge on the Isle of Wight. A solo exhibition of portraits was at the Winter Gardens, Ventnor, from September to October 2010, and another at Dimbola Lodge from February to April 2011.

On 22 April 1987, a charity auction at Christie's, St James's, for the Campaign to Protect Rural England, featured signed work by David Bailey, Patrick Lichfield, Don McCullin, Terence Donovan, Fay Godwin, Heather Angel, Clive Arrowsmith, Linda McCartney, Koo Stark, and fifteen others, Views by Stark, including some of Kirby Muxloe Castle, were in G. H. Davies's England's Glory (1987), a CPRE book launched at the same time.

Pictures by Stark have appeared in Country Life and other magazines. Several of her portraits are in the National Portrait Gallery, and work is also in the collections of the Victoria and Albert Museum, both in London.

A Leica user, Stark has said her camera transcends mere function and is a personal friend. A solo exhibition hosted by the Leica gallery in Mayfair in May 2017 was entitled Kintsugi, a Japanese word for a way of renovating things that have been broken. Stark explained the title: "Kintsugi is a way of learning to see individual beauty, and to appreciate the value of experience and honesty. It is the antithesis of digital, airbrushed, Photoshop-homogenised 'beauty'." In August the exhibition was repeated in Manchester, to mark the opening of a new Leica store there.

== Personal life ==
Stark has been a practising Buddhist since meeting the Dalai Lama. She continues to live in London and is a member of the Chelsea Arts Club. She is a Patron of the Julia Margaret Cameron Trust, at Dimbola Lodge on the Isle of Wight, home of the Victorian pioneer photographer Julia Margaret Cameron.

=== Relationships ===
Stark met the then Prince Andrew (later known as Andrew Mountbatten-Windsor) in February 1981, and they were close for some two years, before and after his active service in the Falklands War. Tina Brown has claimed that this was Andrew's only serious love affair. In October 1982 they took a holiday together on the island of Mustique. According to Lady Colin Campbell, Andrew was in love, and the Queen was "much taken with the elegant, intelligent, and discreet Koo". However, in 1983, after 18 months of dating, they split up under pressure from the Queen. In 1997, Andrew became the godfather of Stark's daughter, and in 2015, when he was accused by Virginia Roberts over the Jeffrey Epstein connection, Stark came to his defence, stating that he was a good man and she could help to rebut the claims.

Stark married Tim Jeffries, manager of a photographic gallery, in August 1984, at St Saviour's, Chalk Farm, with the minister, Christopher Neil-Smith, commenting that "It was such a quiet affair you wouldn't have known it was happening." They stayed together for a year, later divorcing.

She was later engaged to Warren Walker, an American banker, but he cancelled their wedding before the birth of their daughter, Tatiana, in May 1997.

=== Legal cases ===
In 1988, Stark brought a successful libel action against the newspaper Sunday People, owned by Mirror Group, over stories claiming that she was still in a relationship with her former lover Andrew Mountbatten-Windsor whilst being married to Timothy Jefferies. In 1989, The Spectator reported that she had received £300,000 from one newspaper "for years of inaccurate persecution" and was also collecting money from others.

In another libel action in 2007, Stark won an apology and substantial damages from Zoo Weekly magazine, which had described her as a porn star. She commented "I am relieved that my name has been cleared of this false, highly damaging and serious allegation which has been proved to be completely untrue." In 2011 The Daily Telegraph called her an early "Kate Middleton prototype" and suggested that if she had not appeared in the film Emily early in her career she might have gone on to become the Duchess of York.

In November 2012, Stark appeared at Hammersmith magistrates court accused of stealing a painting by Dutch master Anthonie van Borssom, worth £40,000, from the home of her ex-partner, American financier Warren Walker. She strenuously denied the allegation. Before the matter came to trial, the painting was returned to Walker and by agreement the prosecution was abandoned.

In November 2022, Stark was awarded substantial damages and received an apology in a court case brought against Daily Mail's parent company for a 2019 article which falsely referred to her as "a soft porn actress".

=== Health ===
About 1993, Stark was hit by a taxi in Old Compton Street, London, losing two teeth and also suffering a deep wound to her forehead, after a collision with her camera. This accident left her temporarily disfigured, but the wound eventually healed leaving a small scar just under the hair-line.

In 2002, Stark was diagnosed with breast cancer and had a double mastectomy and chemotherapy, causing her to lose her hair for a time.

== Filmography ==
=== Film ===
| Year | Title | Role | Notes |
|---|---|---|---|
| 1974 | All I Want Is You... and You... and You... | Jennifer Ready | |
| 1975 | The Rocky Horror Picture Show | Bridesmaid | Uncredited |
| 1975 | The Adolescents | Ana | |
| 1976 | Emily | Emily / Daughter | |
| 1977 | Cruel Passion | Justine Jerome | |
| 1984 | Electric Dreams | Girl in Soap Opera | |
| 1987 | Eat the Rich | Hazel | |

=== Television ===
| Year | Title | Role | Notes |
|---|---|---|---|
| 1975 | Shades of Greene | Girl | Episode: "The Blue Film" |
| 1977 | The Sunday Drama | Deborah | Episode: "The Cuckoo Calls" |
| 1986 | The Two Ronnies | Alice | Episode #12.2 |
| 1989 | Red Dwarf | Lady Sabrina Mulholland-Jjones | Episode: "Timeslides" |
| 1991 | Cluedo | Miss Scarlett | 6 episodes |

== Publications ==
- Stark, Koo (1985). Contrasts. The Book Service Ltd. ISBN 978-0593010020.

== Photographic exhibitions ==
- 'Contrasts', Hamiltons Gallery, Carlos Place, London, September 1985
- 'The Stark Image', Gallery Bar at Grosvenor House Hotel, London, 1994
- 'Stark Images', Dimbola Lodge, Isle of Wight, June to July 2001
- 'Stark Images', Fruitmarket Gallery, Market Street, Edinburgh, July 2001
- 'Portraits by Koo Stark', Winter Gardens, Ventnor, Isle of Wight, September to October 2010
- 'Koo Stark: Contrasts', Dimbola Lodge, Isle of Wight, February to April, 2011
- 'Kintsugi', Leica gallery, Bruton Place, Mayfair, May 2017
- 'Kintsugi', Leica store, Police Street, Manchester, August 2017
- 'Kintsugi Portraits', San Lorenzo, Beauchamp Place, London SW3, November 2017
