= The Love Box =

1972 British film by Tudor Gates and Wilbur Stark

- Theatrical release quad poster
- Directed by: Tudor Gates; Wilbur Stark (as Billy and Teddy White)
- Written by: Tudor Gates; Wilbur Stark
- Produced by: Tudor Gates; Wilbur Stark executive Barry Jenkins
- Cinematography: Grenville Middleton
- Edited by: Rex Graves
- Music by: Mike Vickers
- Production company: Short Circuit
- Release date: 1 October 1972
- Running time: 91 mins
- Country: United Kingdom
- Language: English
- Budget: £28,000

The Love Box, also known as Lovebox, is a 1972 British sex comedy film. It was written, produced and directed by Tudor Gates and Wilbur Stark under the pseudonyms "Billy and Teddy White".

== Plot ==
Tris Patterson runs a classified ads section called "Love Box" for an entertainment guide magazine. The ads provide the settings for eleven separate self-contained sex comedies:

1. Peter the virgin
2. The sex kittens
3. The young wives' club
4. Massage wanted
5. The trade descriptions act
6. The refined couple
7. The wife swappers
8. Orgy in Kilburn
9. The bored housewife
10. Trying new colours
11. The love park

== Cast ==
=== In the magazine office ===
- Chris Williams as Tris Patterson
- Alison King as Margery
- Simon Legree as Rod
- Maureen Flanagan as Helen

=== Peter the virgin ===
- Maggie Wright as Mrs Angela Simpson
- Paul Aston as Peter
- Christine Bradwell as Miss Harvey

=== The sex kittens ===
- John Mattocks as tom cat
- Lizbeth Lindeborg as blonde kitten
- Minerva Smith as brunette kitten

=== The young wives' club ===
- Jane Cardew as Fran
- Leonora Little as stripper
- Anthony Bailey as Jock
- Rosemary Burdon as club member
- Lita Petrou as club member
- Julia Breck as club member

=== Massage wanted ===
- Elaine Baillie as the masseuse
- Basil Clarke as old man

=== The trade descriptions act ===
- Raymond Young as the official
- Anne Henning as Gerda
- Jennifer Guy as student

=== The refined couple ===
- Peter Burton as Charles
- Alison King as Margery

=== The wife swappers ===
- Freddie Earlle as Bill
- Marianne Morris as Janet
- Charlie Miller as Harry
- Cheryl Gilham as Sally

=== Orgy in Kilburn ===
- Emmet Hennessy as Martin/boy
- Dick Hayden as John
- Georgina Symonds-Rose as Kit
- Trudi Blue as Sandra

=== The bored housewife ===
- Joan Alcorn as Kathy
- Craig Israel as Texan
- Dave Carter as husband

=== Trying new colours ===
- Simon Legree as Rod
- Minah Bird as black girl
- Pauline Anderson as Eskimo
- Vivienne as Chinese girl
- Kerima as Indian girl

=== The love park ===
- Laurie Goode as boy
- Emmett Hennessy as boy
- Nicola Austine as girl
- Sue Bowen as girl
- Jeanette Marsden as girl
- Rina Brown as girl
- Liz Carlson as girl

== Production ==
It was the first film from a production company set up by Tudor Gates, and was originally called Looking for Love. In his interview for the British Entertainment History Project Gates states that he was nervous about the film's reception, so he and co-director Stark adopted the pseudonyms "Billy and Teddy White".

== Reception ==
=== Box office ===
Gates said the film was "very successful of its kind and it did make money for us."

=== Critical reception ===
The Monthly Film Bulletin wrote: "A number of potentially funny situations go sadly to waste in this essentially witless offering. The makers have settled for an 'illustrative' style that reduces every episode to predictable routine, while the attempts at humorous dialogue never rise above the level of smutty double entendre. ('Are you glad you came?' – 'I wasn't sure I could'). Out of a crowded gallery of one-dimensional characters, three performances suggest talents worthy of less limp material: those of Alison King as Margery, of Paul Astor as Peter, and of Maggie Wright, who exudes sensuality and even manages to wring some humour out of her role as Mrs. Simpson. (The number of topical references leaves little doubt that the name is a sly joke in very poor taste.) Directors contemplating this episodic style of sex-comedy might profitably take a look at The Secrets of Sex since, even in the film's censored version, Antony Balch gave a lead which has still to be taken up."

The Spinning Image said: "this is tat, really, but for a glimpse of seventies Britain it is more revealing than many a documentary."
