= Cruel Passion =

1977 film by Chris Boger

- 2012 UK DVD cover
- Directed by: Chris Boger
- Written by: Marquis de Sade (novel); Ian Cullen
- Produced by: Chris Boger
- Starring: Koo Stark; Martin Potter; Lydia Lisle; Katherine Kath
- Cinematography: Roger Deakins
- Edited by: Peter Delfgou
- Distributed by: Euro London Films
- Release date: 1977
- Running time: 98 minutes
- Countries: United Kingdom; Italy; West Germany
- Language: English

Cruel Passion (also known as A Place Beyond, Justine and De Sade's Justine) is a 1977 film directed by Chris Boger and starring Koo Stark, Martin Potter, Lydia Lisle, and Katherine Kath. It was written by Ian Cullen based on the 1791 novel Justine by the Marquis de Sade.

== Plot ==
Justine is a young virgin thrown out of a French orphanage and into the depraved world of prostitution. She slips into a life of debauchery, torture, whipping, slavery and salaciousness, while her brazen, flirtatious and libertine sister Juliette receives nothing but happiness and reward for her wanton behaviour.

== Cast ==
- Koo Stark as Justine Jerome
- Martin Potter as Lord Carlisle
- Lydia Lisle as Juliette Jerome
- Katherine Kath as Madame Laronde
- Hope Jackman as Mrs Bonny
- Barry McGinn as George
- Louis Ife as Pastor John
- Maggie Petersen as Mother Superior
- David Masterman as Archer
- Ian McKay as Brough
- Ann Michelle as Pauline

== Reception ==
The Monthly Film Bulletin wrote: "With snatches of Wagner on the soundtrack, attempts at emulating the pictorialism of Barry Lyndon, and a script of plummy antitheses apparently written in blank verse, it is hard to know whether Cruel Passion really had pretensions entirely belied by its knockabout plot and truly ludicrous dénouement. Filmed in sometimes almost totally obscure reds and browns, the film struggles along, bludgeoning the audience – as well as its two lacklustre heroines – with the moral that no good appears to come of anything, and especially not from virtue. Given the censor's declared antipathy to the linking of sex and violence, it is difficult to know what prompted him to pass the final scenes in which Justine is graphically savaged by two Doberman Pinschers before being raped by a couple of louts."

Time Out wrote "The improbabilities of this awkward period sexploiter (which vainly attempts to emulate the look of Barry Lyndon) are compounded by a strain of casual nastiness which would be thoroughly offensive were it not so carelessly handled. ... Drawn from Sade, the film is veneered with a spurious morality which supposedly made its catchpenny cruelty somehow acceptable to the censor."

Budd Wilkins wrote in Slant magazine: "Chris Boger’s Marquis de Sade’s Justine (a.k.a. Cruel Passion) transplants a significantly truncated version of de Sade’s novel to British soil, more or less preserving the source material’s attacks on institutional and individual hypocrisy, while at the same time sanitizing its depictions of perverse sexuality. Justine never gets much kinkier than some briefly glimpsed nun-on-nun writhing and a couple of cursory whippings. On the sliding scale of Sadean cinema, Justine therefore falls somewhere between the angry political invective of Pasolini’s Salò or Peter Brook’s Marat/Sade and the titillation factor of Jesús Franco’s numerous softcore adaptations. Give it points, though, for taking de Sade’s ideas seriously, and daring to present a relentlessly downbeat vision of moral corruption."

== Home media ==
The DVD is available uncut in the United Kingdom as Cruel Passion and in the United States as Marquis de Sade's Justine.
