= Lucy Kroll =

Lucy Kroll (3 July 1909 – 14 March 1997) was an American theatrical and literary agent. Her clients included Carl Sandburg, James Earl Jones, Norman Mailer, John Vlahos, and Horton Foote. Born in Brooklyn, her maiden name was Lucy Rosengardt. She graduated from Hunter College in 1933.
