= All I Want Is You... and You... and You... =

1974 British film by Bob Kellett

- Directed by: Bob Kellett
- Written by: Jonathan Freud
- Produced by: Wilbur Stark
- Starring: Freddie Earlle; David Griffin; Ian Trigger
- Cinematography: Grenville Middleton
- Edited by: Peter Musgrave
- Music by: Wilbur Stark
- Production company: Globebest Films
- Distributed by: Tigon Film Distributors (UK)
- Release date: 1974
- Running time: 92 min.

All I Want Is You... and You... and You... is a 1974 British comedy film directed by Bob Kellett and starring Freddie Earlle, David Griffin, Sheila Steafel and Carol Cleveland. It was written by Jonathan Freud.

According to the British Film Institute the film "seems to have been lost some time between 1974 and 1986 during transfer of collections/distribution rights"; their database records their 2019 acquisition of a colour print.

Steafel called it "a powder blue movie", writing "We never got to see the final cut. It appears that Mr Stark had tucked the rushes under his arm and disappeared, and it was only finding a review that made me aware it had been not only finished, but distributed."

== Plot ==
An American business tycoon tries to choose a new vice president for his firm in a weekend gathering that soon descends into farce.

== Cast ==
- Freddie Earlle as Doctor Brack
- David Griffin as Freddie Millbank
- Ian Trigger as Joe Hartford
- Sheila Steafel as Wilma Brack
- Marie Rogers as Polly Pearce
- Hilary Pritchard as Freda Donohue
- Carol Cleveland as Eli Hartford
- Barry Linehan as Bull Donohue
- Noel Trevarthen as Frank Pearce
- Timothy Blackstone as boy
- Berrick Kyler as boy
- Julia McCarthy as wife
- Ronnie Stevens as husband
- Koo Stark as Jennifer Ready
- Derek Griffiths as taxi driver
- Louise Stark as Helga

== Reception ==
The Monthly Film Bulletin wrote: "'You just think of the vice-presidency'; 'Thanks. I'll just think about the vice'. If anything could further nail the coffin lid on such less-than-sparkling badinage, it's the actors concerned doing intermittent imitations of the Marx brothers, stealing at least one cumulative gag from Waiting for Godot, and audibly pausing while notional waves of laughter (in reality, one suspects, as slow off the mark as Godot himself) sweep over the auditorium. All I Want Is You... and You... and You ... comes in limply somewhere between the soft-core porn market and British comedies in the style of On the Buses, leaving one with a distinct impression that the cast enjoyed themselves considerably more than any prospective audience could hope to do."
