= Wilbur Stark =

American film producer (1912–1995)

- Born: August 10, 1912; Brooklyn, New York City, U.S.
- Died: August 11, 1995 (aged 83); New York City, U.S.
- Occupations: Producer, director, writer
- Years active: 1946–1989
- Spouse: Kathi Norris (divorced)
- Children: 3, including Koo Stark

Wilbur Stark (August 10, 1912 – August 11, 1995) was an American writer and film, television, and radio producer and director.

== Life ==
Stark was born in Brooklyn and was the brother of Douglas Stark, an actor, Sheldon Stark, a writer, and Midge Stark, another producer. He was educated at the Manual Training High School and Columbia University. In 1935 he was hired by New York radio station WMCA, becoming a top salesman there.

In 1943 he joined the United States Army, then in 1946 established a radio production company, going into partnership with Jerry Layton as Wilbur Stark-Jerry Layton Productions.

Stark first made a name in the 1940s as producer of Movie Matinee, a radio quiz show on WOR, going on to produce more than 1,500 shows on radio and a thousand on television. By January 1950, Stark and Layton had produced nearly eight hundred network program episodes, many for DuMont. In December 1950, they announced that they were setting up separate offices, but would continue as partners splitting the packages and talent they already represented.

Stark's credits as a television producer included Colonel Humphrey Flack and Rocky King Detective in the 1950s and The Brothers Brannagan in 1960-61. Moving on to the film world, Stark was producer of Act of Reprisal (1964), My Lover, My Son (1970), All I Want Is You... and You... and You... (1974), Cat People (1982), and The Storyteller.

In 1983, Photoplay noted that Stark "makes a profitable habit of buying up good old movies for fashionable re-treads (such as Cat People, last year) is planning his own, more contemporary revision of Suspicion".

In 1945 he married Kathi Norris, who was then a radio writer, and they had two daughters, Pamela and Koo, and two sons, Wilbur Junior, known as Brad, and Patrick. The family moved to London in the 1960s, beginning a new life. There the elder daughter was pursued by Sir William Pigott Brown, but according to Private Eye "So vile were Piggott-Brown's attentions and habits that Stark bought him off, presenting the reptile with a cheque for 500 dollars." However, the offender framed the cheque and hung it on his wall. Pamela graduated from Goddard College and Harvard, became a consultant to non-profit organizations, and married Sheldon Guyer, a vice president of Merrill Lynch, in 1993.

Stark and his wife separated and divorced in the 1960s.

In 1980, Fantasy Newsletter reported that Stark had bought the rights to several old RKO fantasy films, intending to remake them. It suggested the most significant of these purchases was The Thing From Another World. When The Thing (1982) came to be made, Stark was executive producer.

Stark was also a director and writer, his writing credits including Vampire Circus (1971), The Love Box, and The Stud (1974).

By the 1990s, Stark was living in Los Angeles. He died of cancer in August 1995 at New York Hospital.

== Films ==
- Act of Reprisal (1964) – Producer
- My Lover, My Son (1970) – Writer and Producer
- Vampire Circus (1971) – Writer and Producer
- The Love Box (1972) – under the pseudonyms "Billy and Teddy White", alongside Tudor Gates – both credited as writers, producers and directors
- All I Want Is You... and You... and You... (1974) – Producer
- The Thing (1982) – Executive producer
- Cat People (1982) – Executive consultant
