= Katherine Kath =

French ballerina and actress (1920–2012)

- Publicity still for BBC TV's The Hunted (1961)
- Born: Rose Marie Lily Faess; 11 August 1920; Berck, Pas-de-Calais, France
- Died: 17 November 2012 (aged 92); Berck, Pas-de-Calais, France
- Occupations: Ballerina, actress
- Years active: 1947–1989
- Spouse: Jack Clayton (1953–?)

Katherine Kath (born Rose Marie Lily Faess; 11 August 1920 – 17 November 2012) was a French prima ballerina at the Theatre du Chatelet in Paris, who became an actress after suffering from an injury which destroyed her chances of continuing her career.

== Biography ==
Kath was born in Berck, Pas-de-Calais, France, where she also died, at age 92 in 2012, from undisclosed causes. Until shortly before then, she was living in London, near Fulham Road.

She appeared in many international films and television programmes during her acting career. She met British filmmaker Jack Clayton in 1952, during the making of Moulin Rouge, in which she portrayed the can-can dancer La Goulue and on which Clayton was the assistant director.

Jack was gifted a watercolour of Katherine by Marcel Vertès, who won two academy awards for his work on the film. It was signed "A Jack Clayton tres amicalement".

The couple married in 1953, following Clayton's divorce from his first wife, Christine Norden, but the union was shortlived.

== Filmography ==
=== Film ===
Year	Title	Role	Notes
1947	Captain Blomet		
1948	The Cavalier of Croix-Mort	Sandrine	
1948	The Cupboard Was Bare	L'actrice	
1948	Toute la famille était là	Rita Barbara	
1949	Thus Finishes the Night	Une voyageuse	
1950	Fugitive from Montreal		
1952	Crimson Curtain		
1952	Moulin Rouge	Louise Weber (La Goulue)	
1953	Inside a Girls' Dormitory	Mlle. Claude Persal	
1954	Daughters of Destiny	La ribaude	Segment: "Jeanne"
1954	Oh No, Mam'zelle	Gimblette	
1955	Madonna of the Sleeping Cars	Irena	
1956	Peril for the Guy	Anita Fox	
1956	A Touch of the Sun	Lucienne	
1956	Anastasia	Maxime	
1957	Let's Be Happy	Mrs. Fielding	
1957	These Dangerous Years	Mrs. Wyman	
1957	Seven Thunders	Mme. Parfait	
1958	The Man Who Wouldn't Talk	Yvonne Delbeau	
1959	Subway in the Sky	Anna Grant	
1961	Fury at Smugglers' Bay	Maman	
1962	Gigot	Colette	
1963	Aliki	Anna	
1964	Circus World	Hilda	
1965	The High Bright Sun	Mrs. Andros	
1969	The Assassination Bureau	Mme. Lucoville	
1971	Mary, Queen of Scots	Catherine de' Medici	
1977	Marquis de Sade's Justine	Mme. Laronde	

=== Television ===
Year	Title	Role	Notes
1956, 1966	Armchair Theatre	Mila Kosky, Carole Millard	Episodes: "The Mother", "The Three Barrelled Shotgun"
1957	The Benny Hill Show		Episode: "2.1"
1958	Uncertain Mercy	Marya Borow	TV film
1958	Sunday Night Theatre	Nina	Episode: "The Uninvited"
1958–59	Television Playwright	Maria Venucci / Anna Rojas	Episodes: "The Marrying of Milly", "The Dark Side of the Earth"
1959	Foreign Field	Cyprine	TV film
1959	Never Die	Odette Marceau	TV film
1960	BBC Sunday-Night Play	Sister Annelise	Episode: "The Small Victory"
1961	The Hunted	Giselle	TV film
1967	The Prisoner	Engadine	Episode: "A. B. and C."
1972	Doomwatch	Lady Janette Holroyd	Episode: "Without the Bomb"
1974	QB VII	Mrs. Czerny	Episode: "Part 3"
1975	Shades of Greene	The Madam	Episode: "The Root of All Evil"
1980	Love in a Cold Climate	Old Countess	Episode: "Monsieur Le Duc"
1984	The Man Who Married a French Wife	Maman	TV film
1986	Just Good Friends	The Secretary	Episode: "The Wedding"
1987	Horizon	Pop Prior	Episode: "The Race for the Double Helix"
1989	The Pied Piper	French Woman on Train	TV film
