= A Tale of Five Cities =

1951 British-Italian film by Romolo Marcellini et al

- US theatrical poster
- Directed by: Romolo Marcellini; Emil E. Reinert; Wolfgang Staudte; Montgomery Tully; Géza von Cziffra; Irma von Cube
- Written by: Maurice J. Wilson; Jacques Companéez; Patrick Kirwan; Richard Llewellyn; Alexander Paal; Piero Tellini; Günther Weisenborn
- Produced by: Ermanno Donati; Boris Morros; Alexander Paal; Paul Pantaleen; Maurice J. Wilson
- Starring: Bonar Colleano; Gina Lollobrigida; Eva Bartok
- Edited by: Maurice Rootes
- Music by: Hans May
- Release date: 1 March 1951
- Running time: 86 minutes
- Countries: United Kingdom; Italy; West Germany; France; Austria; East Germany
- Languages: English; Italian

A Tale of Five Cities (Italian: Passaporto per l'oriente and released as A Tale of Five Women in the US) is a 1951 British-Italian international co-production comedy drama film directed by Romolo Marcellini, Emil E. Reinert, Wolfgang Staudte, Montgomery Tully, Irma von Cube and Géza von Cziffra. It was written by Maurice J. Wilson, Jacques Companéez, Patrick Kirwan, Richard Llewellyn, Alexander Paal, Piero Tellini and Günther Weisenborn.

The five cities cited in the title are: Rome, Paris, Berlin, London, and Vienna.

== Plot ==
Englishman Bob Mitchell leaves his longtime home in America to enlist in the Royal Air Force. After the war has ended, a drunken accident in a Berlin nightclub results in his losing his memory.

As he has no identity tags, doctors mistakenly repatriate him to America, where magazine writer Lesley learns of his condition. The only evidence of his past is a set of five bank notes from different countries, each signed with a woman's name.

Lesley's magazine sponsors a trip for him to visit the five countries where the bank notes were issued, hoping he can find details of his identity.

== Cast ==
- Bonar Colleano as Bob Mitchell
- Barbara Kelly as Lesley, American magazine writer
- Anne Vernon as Jeannine Meunier
- Karin Himboldt as Charlotte Smith (as Karin Himbold)
- Lily Kann as Charlady (as Lily Kahn)
- Danny Green as Levinsky
- Carl Jaffe as Charlotte's brother
- MacDonald Parke as New York magazine editor
- Althea Orr as Matron (as Aletha Orr)
- Lana Morris as Delia Morel Romanoff
- Eva Bartok as Kathaline Telek
- Gina Lollobrigida as Maria Severini
- Geoffrey Sumner as Wingco
- Philip Leaver as Italian official
- Annette Poivre as Annette
- Charles Irwin as London editor
- Arthur Gomez as Carabinieri
- Andrew Irvine as Jimmy
- Raymond Bussières as Jeannine's brother
- Marcello Mastroianni as Aldo Mazzetti
- Enzo Staiola as boy
- Peter Marr as child eating soup

== Production ==
Shooting took place at the Riverside Studios and Walton Studios as well as on location around the various cities. The film's sets were designed by the art directors Don Russell, Jean d'Eaubonne, Fritz Jüptner-Jonstorff and Walter Kutz.

== Critical reception ==
Kine Weekly said "Omnibus romantic comedy melodrama. Prodigious and original, it accompanies an amnesia victim, formerly an officer in the RAF on an identity-seeking mission to various European capitals, sponsored by an American magazine. First-rate British offering."

Monthly Film Bulletin said "The story, stretching coincidence as it does, is highly improbable, and the script fragmentary. A Tale of Five Cities, too, has failed to make as much use as might be expected of the opportunities provided by the varied locations. As a whole, indeed, the film suffers from trying to cover too much ground, and to include too many varied stories. Much of it is superficial and unoriginal. But there are some pleasant humorous touches and, although many of the players seem inexperienced, Bonar Colleano does adequately as the bewildered young man."

Leslie Halliwell said: "Tedious pattern drama remarkable only for its then untried cast."

In British Sound Films: The Studio Years 1928–1959 David Quinlan rated the film as "mediocre", writing: "Some authentic atmosphere, otherwise a misfire."
