= Columbus Discovers Kraehwinkel =

1954 film

- Directed by: Ulrich Erfurth; Alexander Paal
- Written by: Alexander Paal; Axel von Ambesser
- Produced by: Walter Koppel
- Starring: Eva Kerbler; Sydney Chaplin; Rudolf Platte
- Cinematography: Erich Claunigk
- Edited by: Klaus Dudenhöfer
- Music by: Michael Jary
- Production company: Real Film
- Distributed by: Europa-Filmverleih
- Release date: 10 August 1954
- Running time: 93 minutes
- Country: West Germany
- Language: German

Columbus Discovers Kraehwinkel (German: Columbus entdeckt Krähwinkel) is a 1954 West German comedy film directed by Ulrich Erfurth and Alexander Paal and starring Eva Kerbler, Rudolf Platte and two sons of Charlie Chaplin, Charles Chaplin Jr. and Sydney Chaplin .

The film's sets were designed by the art director Albrecht Becker and Herbert Kirchhoff. It was shot at the Wandsbek Studios in Hamburg and on location around Michelstadt.

== Partial cast ==
- Charles Chaplin Jr. as Jimmy Hunter
- Sydney Chaplin as Clark Hunter
- Eva Kerbler as Eva Wagner
- Paola Loew as Suzi Merzheim
- Rudolf Platte as Lüttgen
- Paul Henckels as Wagner
- Ursula Herking as Mrs. Wagner
- Carl Wery as Merzheim
- Paul Westermeier as Maier
- Hubert von Meyerinck as Regwitz
- Joseph Egger as Wiebel
