= The Hook (1976 film) =

- Directed by: Erricos Andreou
- Written by: Erricos Andreou
- Produced by: Klearhos Konitsiotis
- Starring: Barbara Bouchet; Günther Stoll; Robert Behling
- Music by: Giorgos Hatzinasios
- Release date: January 19, 1976
- Running time: 93 minutes
- Country: Greece
- Language: Greek

The Hook (also known as To Agistri) is 1976 giallo film directed by Erricos Andreou and starring Barbara Bouchet.

== Plot ==
Kostas is a powerful tycoon with a beautiful wife, who is cheating on him with a young playboy. Unbeknownst to Kostas, the two lovers plan on killing him.

== Cast ==
- Barbara Bouchet as Iro Maras
- Günther Stoll as Kostas Maras
- Robert Behling as Nick Vitalis
- Sofia Roubou as Nelly
- Giorgos Kyritsis as Inspector Alexiou
- Dinos Karidis as Lieutenant Platis
- Giorgos Vakouletos as Giorgos
- Jessica Dublin as Blonde Lady Friend Of Kostas

== Reception ==
One reviewer said, "The film has cult status among many giallos lovers, but its characters are flat and its story is inconsistent in its surprising twist, invalidating as implausible the police investigation in pursuit of arbitrary impact."
