= Kathi Norris =

American television host (1919–2005)

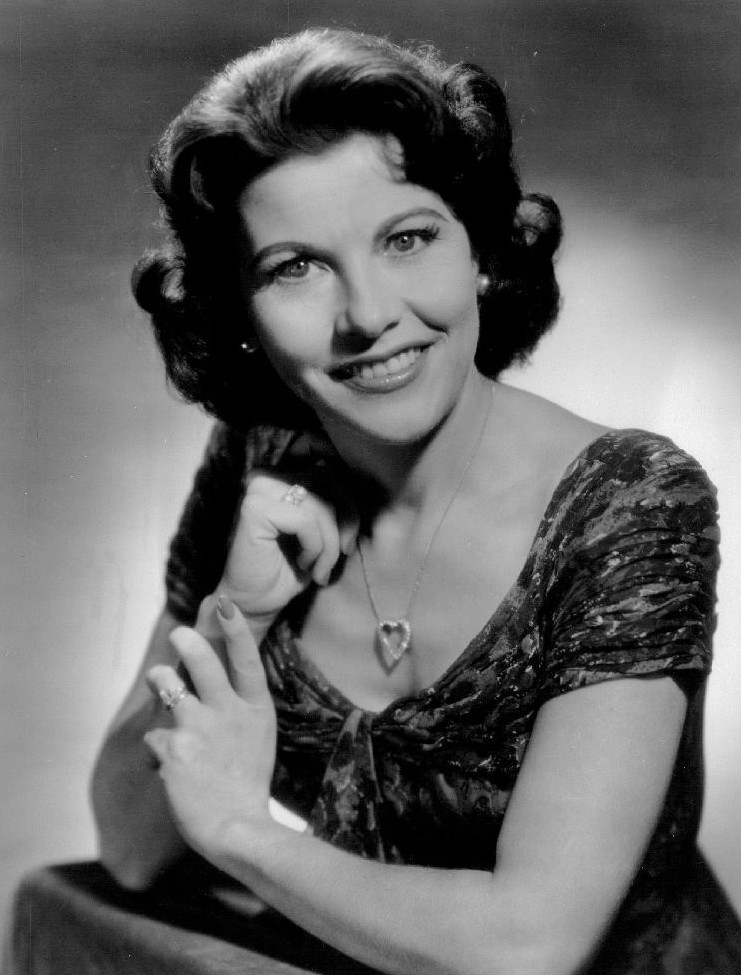
Norris in 1960

Kathleen Norris Stark Caruso (June 1, 1919 – June 15, 2005), known professionally as Kathi Norris, was an American writer and television presenter.

== Career ==
Norris's father was a woodworker and cabinetmaker, and also a musician, playing the French horn and the viola in the Newark Symphony Orchestra. She had an older sister, Helen, who became a schoolteacher, and three older brothers, Carl, Donald, and Lowell Norris. The family were Presbyterians.

Kathi Norris became an advertising executive at W. R. Grace in Chicago and a radio writer, marrying Wilbur Stark in 1945. She hosted the first daytime talk show on WABD, the DuMont Television Network flagship TV station in New York City. The show was known by the alternate titles Kathi Norris' Television Shopper, TV Shopper, and Your Television Shopper, which ran on DuMont from November 1, 1948, to December 1, 1950, and as The Kathi Norris Show which ran from 1950 to 1955 on DuMont, and on ABC from 1955 to 1957.

When her father died in 1957, she was living in Bronxville, New York.

Norris also was host of the DuMont game show Spin the Picture (4 June 1949 - 4 February 1950), and was host of the syndicated TV series True Story (1957–1961) produced by her husband Wilbur Stark (1912–1995). Norris also appeared in the TV series Modern Romances (NBC, 1954) and did occasional women's segments for The Today Show with Dave Garroway. Model and film actress Koo Stark is her daughter with Stark. Norris was married to 1950s TV host Carl Caruso from 1979 until her death. She and Caruso had co-hosted Spin the Picture. Her husband died in 2001.

Norris died in London in June 2005, aged 86, survived by her children Pamela Stark-Guyer, Kathleen (Koo) Stark, and Wilbur B. Stark, three stepchildren, five grandchildren, and two great-grandchildren.

== See also ==
- List of programs broadcast by the DuMont Television Network
- List of surviving DuMont Television Network broadcasts

== Bibliography ==
- David Weinstein, The Forgotten Network: DuMont and the Birth of American Television (Philadelphia: Temple University Press, 2004)
- Alex McNeil, Total Television, Fourth edition (New York: Penguin Books, 1980) ISBN 0-14-024916-8
- Tim Brooks and Earle Marsh, The Complete Directory to Prime Time Network TV Shows, Third edition (New York: Ballantine Books, 1964) ISBN 0-345-31864-1
