= Countess Dracula =

1971 British horror film by Peter Sasdy

- Theatrical release poster
- Directed by: Peter Sasdy
- Written by: Jeremy Paul
- Produced by: Alexander Paal
- Starring: Ingrid Pitt; Nigel Green; Lesley-Anne Down
- Cinematography: Kenneth Talbot
- Edited by: Henry Richardson
- Music by: Harry Robertson
- Production company: Hammer Film Productions
- Distributed by: Rank Film Distributors (UK); 20th-Century Fox (US)
- Release dates: 14 February 1971 (UK); 15 October 1972 (US)
- Running time: 93 minutes
- Country: United Kingdom
- Language: English

Countess Dracula is a 1971 British Hammer horror film directed by Peter Sasdy and starring Ingrid Pitt, Nigel Green and Lesley-Anne Down. It was written by Jeremy Paul and produced by Alexander Paal.

Countess Dracula was inspired by the infamous Hungarian Countess Elizabeth Báthory (1560–1614), a landowner and noblewoman who was accused of murdering dozens of women and girls. Her husband was Ferenc Nádasdy, Nádasdy being the surname given to the Countess in the film.

== Plot ==
In 17th-century Hungary, recently widowed Countess Elisabeth Nádasdy discovers that her youthful appearance and libido can be temporarily restored if she bathes in the blood of young women. She enlists her steward and lover Captain Dobi and her maid Julie to help with the kidnap and murder of several local girls, whilst beginning a romance with a young Lieutenant named Imre Toth.

As a cover for her crimes while in her rejuvenated state, she takes the identity of her own 19-year-old daughter, Countess Ilona, whom she has Dobi hold captive in the woods by the mute money gambler. However, castle historian Fabio grows suspicious. Eventually, she kills a prostitute called Ziza, but her blood does not restore her like the others. Dobi finds Fabio, who has a book-chapter about blood sacrifices and tells Elisabeth the truth in return for being allowed to live. He reveals that only virgin blood will restore Elisabeth's youth and beauty.

Elisabeth then kills a peasant girl bought in the marketplace. Fabio tries to tell Toth the truth about her, but Dobi kills Fabio before he can do so. Dobi then exposes Elisabeth to Toth to steer him away from her. Elisabeth forces Toth into marrying her, but her daughter Ilona arrives home, having been brought by Dobi as a sacrifice, then freed by a repentant Julie who loved her as a daughter. At the wedding, Elisabeth grows old again after the priest pronounces the blessing. She tries to kill her daughter in front of the wedding attendees, but accidentally kills Toth instead. Elisabeth, Dobi and Julie are sentenced to death for their crimes and are last seen awaiting the hangman in their cell. In the final scene, the peasants curse Elisabeth as a "devil woman" and "Countess Dracula".

== Cast ==
- Ingrid Pitt as Countess Elisabeth Nadasdy (voice dubbed by Olive Gregg, uncredited)
- Nigel Green as Captain Dobi, castle steward
- Sandor Elès as Lt. Imre Toth
- Maurice Denham as Grand Master Fabio, castle historian
- Patience Collier as Julie Szentes, nurse
- Lesley-Anne Down as Countess Ilona Nadasdy, Elisabeth's daughter
- Peter Jeffrey as Captain Balogh, chief bailiff
- Leon Lissek as Sergeant of Bailiffs
- Jessie Evans as Rosa, Teri's mother
- Andria Lawrence as Ziza, whore at the Shepperd's Inn
- Susan Brodrick as Teri, chambermaid
- Niké Arrighi as fortune-telling gypsy girl
- Marianne Stone as kitchen maid
- Charles Farrell as seller
- Anne Stallybrass as pregnant woman
- Michael Cadman as young man
- Ian Trigger as clown
- Alex Greenland (uncredited) as choirboy
- Hülya Babuş as dancer

== Production ==
The original music score was composed by Harry Robertson. The movie was partly financed by Rank.

== Release ==
The film opened at the New Victoria cinema in London on 31 January 1971 before going on general release in the UK on 14 February. It opened October 1972 in the United States. It was released on a double bill with Vampire Circus (1972) at the Forum Theater at Broadway and 47th Street in New York City and also played in neighborhood and regional theaters.

== Critical reception ==
In The Hammer Story: The Authorised History of Hammer Films, Barnes and Hearne wrote that the film's "distinctly anemic blood-lettings fail to lift a rather tiresome tale of court intrigue."

New York Times film critic Howard Thompson considered it "better than most [horror movies] in a sea of trashy competition", and called Peter Sasdy's direction "smooth and pointed" with "crisp, cutting edge" dialogue, until the last act of the film where "it runs out of gas, along with the desperate old woman [Countess Elizabeth]."

David Pirie of The Monthly Film Bulletin called the acting "extremely poor," but found that the film "frequently takes on a nightmare quality" and that Pitt "brings to the part a very potent aura of physical corruption that is especially effective in the transformation sequences."

Filmink argued the film was "not as fun a movie as The Vampire Lovers (it lacks energy and needed to be trashier) but Pitt is superb."

In The Radio Times Guide to Films Adrian Turner gave the film 3/5 stars, writing: "Ingrid Pitt, the first lady of British horror movies, excels in this colourful hokum based on the legend of notorious Hungarian countess Elizabeth Bathory. The film atones for its lack of horror with a brittle atmosphere of decay."

Leslie Halliwell wrote "Risibly sub-Freudian addition to a grotesque Hammer gallery of monsters, indistinguishable from the othes, once it gets going."

== Novelizations ==
Two novelizations of the film have been published:

- 1971, by Michel Parry, Sphere Books (U.K.) (67091)/Beagle Books (U.S.) (94081), later reprinted in 1995 by Redemption Books (ISBN 1-899634-00-2).
- 2013, by Guy Adams, Penguin Random House (ISBN 978-0-09-955386-1)

== Home media ==
The film is available on DVD from Metro-Goldwyn-Mayer in the US as a double-bill with The Vampire Lovers, and from Carlton in the UK in a box set with Twins of Evil and Vampire Circus.

Synapse released a Blu-ray/DVD combo pack in the U.S. in 2014, which featured a new high-definition transfer.

== See also ==
- Vampire film
- Cruelty and the Beast, a concept album by Cradle of Filth on which Pitt performs narration as Báthory.
