= John Vlahos =

American playwright and screenwriter (1917–2004)

- Born: December 26, 1917; Springfield, Ohio, U.S.
- Died: April 8, 2004 (aged 86); Westport, Connecticut, U.S.
- Occupations: Screenwriter, playwright
- Spouse: Olivia Vlahos
- Children: Dr. Michael Vlahos, Melissa Vlahos, Stephanie Vlahos
- Writing career
- Years active: 1941–2004
- Notable works: The Defenders, Route 66, The United States Steel Hour, A Business Proposition, The Brandenberg Gate
- Notable awards: Emmy Award (1962), Sylvania Award (1958), Ohio State Radio-TV Award

John Vlahos (December 26, 1917 – April 8, 2004) was an American screenwriter.

Along with his contemporaries, Horton Foote, Reginald Rose, and Rod Serling, he was one of the leading screenwriters of the 1950s and 1960s, writing for television series, including The Philco Television Playhouse, Studio One, Robert Montgomery Presents, Goodyear Television Playhouse, The United States Steel Hour, Climax!, Playhouse 90, The Alcoa Hour, Boris Karloff's Thriller, Route 66, The Defenders, The Nurses, Doctor Kildare, and Marcus Welby, M.D..

His credits include seventeen film screenplays, seventy radio scripts, fifty-two network television live and film dramas, and more than two hundred episodes for various daytime shows.

== Early life and education ==
Born in Springfield, Ohio, to Greek Orthodox parents, Vlahos worked in the family restaurant as a youth. He attended Wittenberg University and Carnegie Institute of Technology (class of 1939), where he majored in drama.

== Career ==
In 1941, he moved to the West Coast and wrote for a series of Range Busters westerns for Monogram Pictures.

During World War II, he served in the U.S. Navy in the South Pacific. After World War II, he spent seven years with the Armed Forces Radio Service.

He turned his hand to television in 1952, when Hal Peary, best known for his role as the Great Gildersleeve, commissioned him to write episodes of a planned series called Call Me Papa; or, Pigeon Point. After several years in Hollywood, Vlahos moved in 1958 to Westport, Connecticut, where he lived the rest of his life.

Vlahos excelled especially in plays broadcast live. Among Vlahos's early successes was A Business Proposition (1955), "a tender tale or two middle-aged people who attempt to establish a business despite tremendous odds", and A Bend in the Road (1957), which he described as being "about a Protestant minister's search for his usefulness. He's an old man in a nation of youth and youth's success. What can he contribute. He goes through a spiritual evaluation of himself, to the world, to himself, and to his family." Other notable early works include Tongues of Angels (1958), a drama about a farmer who feigns muteness to hide his severe stutter, and Beaver Patrol (1958), a comedy about a retired New York businessman who assumes leadership of a Cub Scout pack. His Cold War drama, The Brandenberg Gate, set in Berlin, was produced for television three times in eight years—first for Motorola TV Hour with Jack Palance and Maria Riva (1953), then with Climax! (under the title The Largest City in Captivity) with Franchot Tone and Viveca Lindfors (1957), and finally for the United States Steel Hour with Richard Kiley and Dina Merrill (1961).

Among other notable works were his script for the television film Silent Night, Lonely Night (1969), starring Lloyd Bridges and Shirley Jones, and Act of Reprisal (1964), a feature film on the Cyprus dispute that starred a young Jeremy Brett. A 1991 review of a revival of the film noted "a certain lustiness and clarity in its storytelling".

Vlahos's play The Golden Age of Pericles Pappas, for which he was awarded a fellowship from the Ford Foundation, was produced at the Tulsa Little Theater in 1959. His biopic on labor leader Samuel Gompers rooted his activism in the study of the Talmud. He also wrote a promotional film, The Big Decision, for Wittenberg University, which awarded Vlahos an honorary doctorate in 1958, and he developed poetic liturgies performed at the Unitarian Church in Westport.

Vlahos worked alongside the leading writers and producers of the early years of television. His agent, Lucy Kroll, also represented Horton Foote. His co-writers for the United States Steel Hour, included Foote, Arnold Schulman, Arthur Hailey, Tad Mosel, Rod Serling, and Ira Levin. He wrote episodes for the Emmy Award–winning courtroom series The Defenders, created by Reginald Rose. Recalling his work with Rose, Vlahos noted, "In my case I get so involved with the people, I have practically no story. He's always sending me back to put the story in."

=== Honors ===
Among the honors he received are the Sylvania Award in 1958 (for Beaver Patrol, a comedy for the U.S. Steel Hour) and an Emmy Award in 1962 (for "Killer Instinct", an episode of The Defenders). He also received an Ohio State Radio-TV Award for Best Documentary, a Freedom Foundation Award for Best Historic Family Series, an Institution for Education Award for Distinguished Radio Writing, and the 1959 Ford Foundation Award for playwriting.

== Personal life ==
John Vlahos lived in Westport for fifty years with his wife Olivia Vlahos, a professor and bestselling writer. They met in 1939 at the Old Wharf Theatre, in Provincetown, Massachusetts, home of many independently produced plays and often continued its legacy of experiment in art. It was for a time the home base for the Community Theatre division of the Federal Theatre Project (1936–39), used as a training center to send directors, actors, teachers and designers out to the five boroughs of New York City to create theatre projects.

Olivia Vlahos, as a young actress toured Texas with the Interstate Players and went onto study at the University of Texas, Houston where she wrote and performed in shows for the United Service Organizations and, under the tutelage of American anthropologist Gilbert McAllister, discovered her love of anthropology.

They had three children, Dr. Michael Vlahos, Melissa Vlahos and Stephanie Vlahos.

An archive of John Vlahos's original teleplays and film scripts was sold by the antiquarian bookseller, Carpe Librum.

== Death ==
"Thank you for making articulate our lives, thank you for making articulate our problems, thank you for revealing all to see our feelings."

John Vlahos died on April 8, 2004, at home in Westport at the age of 87.
