= Tongues of Angels (Studio One) =

- Studio One episode
- Episode no.: Season 10; Episode 24
- Directed by: Herbert Hirschman
- Written by: John Vlahos
- Original air date: March 17, 1958

Episode chronology
← Previous "A Dead Ringer"	Next → "The Award Winner"

"Tongues of Angels" is a 1958 American television play by John Vlahos, directed by Herbert Hirschman, and produced by Norman Felton as a final-season episode of the CBS dramatic anthology series, Studio One. Unveiled on St. Patrick's Day, this episode starred Margaret O'Brien, Leon Ames, Frances Farmer and James MacArthur, and featured an early score by Jerry Goldsmith.

== Cast ==
- Margaret O'Brien as Jenny
- Leon Ames as Cyrus
- Frances Farmer as Sarah
- James MacArthur as Ben
- Olan Soule as Dr. Longworth (uncredited)

== Production ==
The writer John Vlahos modeled his young protagonist, the seemingly deaf-mute hired hand Ben, on the story of a real-life counterpart in Iowa, as recounted to him by the episode's producer, Norman Felton. (Note: Shortly before the episode's debut an article was published, penned by the playwright himself, explaining that drawing inspiration from eminently sympathetic, real-life protagonists was standard operating procedure for Vlahos.) Shortly after the script was completed, it was seen by a fellow client of Vlahos's agent, actress Helen Hayes, who saw the work as a great fit for her adopted son, James MacArthur.

The episode marked a reunion of sorts for Ames and O'Brien, once again cast as father and daughter, just as they had been 14 years before (alongside Mary Astor and Judy Garland, respectively), in MGM's Meet Me in St. Louis. For Frances Farmer, cast as the devoted but charitable mother (and surprisingly strong-willed wife), it represented arguably the most substantive and impactful of the less-than-handful of TV appearances made near the tail end of her screen career.

== Reception ==
Time Magazine is mixed in its assessment of the play as a whole but wholehearted in praising what is deemed a breakout performance by 20-year-old James MacArthur, (Note: A point stressed, with bias duly acknowledged, by MacArthur's "utterly amazed" adoptive mom, Helen Hayes: It was extraordinary. I feel self-conscious talking about him, but I'm not ever biased about acting. There was no possible element of accident in this performance. It was an awful challenge, and he showed he is a real actor.) credited here for all but single-handedly raising the level of this final-season installment of an undeniably storied but by-then-sputtering anthology series.

Fledgling actor James MacArthur, 20, turned 'The Tongues of Angels' into one of the best hours of Studio One since the rating-rickety show deserted Manhattan for Hollywood last January. [...] MacArthur caught the withdrawn dignity and explosive rage of a troubled teen-ager who was befriended and helped by a farm girl (Margaret O'Brien). His acting persevered over a plot that did wonders for the hero’s stammer but never overcame its own.

In a brief but glowing review, New York Times critic J.P. Shanley rated the drama "an impressive return to professionalism" following the "series of excursions into mediocrity" that had characterized Studio One's West-Coast incarnation thus far. After summarizing the episode's plot and praising all parties involved in its production, Shanley doubled down on his initial point.

With 'Tongues of Angels,' 'Studio One in Hollywood' has conquered the blight that seemed to infect the series since it moved from New York to the West Coast. Its recovery was exciting and gratifying.
