= Ian Trigger =

British actor (1938–2010)

- Trigger c. 1974
- Born: 30 September 1938; Plymouth, Devon, England
- Died: January 6, 2010 (aged 71); King's College Hospital, London, England
- Education: Devonport High School for Boys, Royal Academy of Dramatic Art
- Occupation: Actor

Ian Trigger (30 September 1938 – 6 January 2010) was a British actor who had a successful career in the United States. A diminutive actor, Trigger worked in London's West End, on Broadway in New York, and across America. He first appeared in the United States with the Young Vic company following which he lived there for many years.

== Early career ==
Ian J. Trigger was born in Plymouth, Devon in 1938 where he attended Devonport High School for Boys. After his death Trigger's twin brother Allan said: "When we were young, Ian would say, I want to be an actor – nothing else will do. Shakespeare was the love of his life and if he could have spent his entire career playing Shakespeare then that would have been total fulfilment for him." He received a scholarship to the Royal Academy of Dramatic Art (RADA) in 1955 making him at that time the youngest student to have trained there. He graduated from RADA in 1959 due to his training being interrupted by two years national service in the army, which he served in Scotland. On leaving RADA Trigger did repertory including Henry IV, Part 2 with the Birmingham Repertory Theatre (1960), the Citizens Theatre in Glasgow, The Gateway in Edinburgh and the Bristol Old Vic. He then went to the newly formed Traverse Theatre before moving to the West End.

== Film and television ==
His television roles included: Raguideau in Napoleon and Love (1974); Gnat in the TV film Alice Through the Looking-Glass (1973); Joseph's Brother in the TV version of Joseph and the Amazing Technicolor Dreamcoat (1972); Gideon in It's Awfully Bad for Your Eyes, Darling (1971); Luko in Ace of Wands (1971); Eddie in Bright's Boffins (1971); Imaginary Man in Six Dates with Barker (1971); Wee Georgie in That's Your Funeral (1971); Dennis in Tales of Unease (1970); in Ken Dodd & the Diddy Men (1969); Goblin in Knock Three Times (1968) with Hattie Jacques; Bobin in Ooh La La! (1968); various roles in The Stanley Baxter Show (1967); Hobgoblin in Kenilworth (1967); Greenwater in The Forsyte Saga (1967); Bank Teller in Beggar My Neighbour (1967); Nonesuch in The Corridor People (1966); Morris Todd in The Wednesday Play (1966); in Frankie Howerd (1966); Operator in Theatre 625 (1965); Opium in A Slight Case of... (1965); in Hugh and I (1965); in Going, Going, Gone! (1965); in The Critics (1965); Rev. Wadmore in The Big Noise (1964); in World of His Own (1964); R. Sammy in Story Parade (1964); Sandy McKinley in Dr. Finlay's Casebook (1964); Ship Tailor in Dixon of Dock Green (1964), and Attendant in The Dark Island (1962).

Film appearances include; The Jeweler in The Fantastic Four (1994); Joe Hartford in All I Want Is You... and You... and You... (1974); Frog Footman in Alice's Adventures in Wonderland (1972); Lucky Charm Seller in Up the Chastity Belt (1972); Odius in Up Pompeii (1971); Clown in Countess Dracula (1971); Wee Georgie in Winning the Ashes (1971); Dr Ponti in Pussycat, Pussycat, I Love You (1970); Nathaniel Winkle in Pickwick (1969); Popov's assistant in Diamonds for Breakfast (1968), and in Up Jumped a Swagman (1965).

== Stage career ==
At the Traverse Theatre as part of the Edinburgh International Festival Trigger played comedy leads in such productions as Ubu Roi and Fairy Tales of New York before moving to London to appear as Humphrey in See How They Run (1964) at the Vaudeville Theatre in London. His other appearances include The Taming of the Shrew and Doctor Faustus at the Marlowe Theatre in Canterbury; Thomas in Molière's The Imaginary Invalid at the Vaudeville Theatre (1968), and for which he was nominated for Best Actor of the Year in the London Critics' Awards; Piglet in Winnie-the-Pooh (1964); Ariel in The Tempest at the Oxford Playhouse (1969); Nana/Smee in Peter Pan at the London Coliseum (1971); Balthazar/Dr Finch in The Comedy of Errors at the National Theatre and the Young Vic (1971); in Andrew Lloyd Webber's musical Joseph and the Amazing Technicolor Dreamcoat (1972) with the Young Vic at the Roundhouse in London (and in 1973 at the Albery Theatre) with Gary Bond as Joseph; in Richard Harris' Outside Edge at the Queen's Theatre (1979) in London with Julia McKenzie, Maureen Lipman and Julian Curry. On Broadway he played the Police Inspector in 13 Rue de l'Amour (1978); Sir Henry Shorter in Habeas Corpus (1976); Argante in Scapino (1974-1975) at the Ambassador Theatre, and appeared in Blondel at the Theatre Royal, Bath (1983).

Among the many young actors mentored by Trigger was the American Lenny Von Dohlen, who later was to appear in Twin Peaks; the two had first met in Oregon during a production of Loot by Joe Orton. Recalling that time, Von Dohlen said: "He was my theatrical father. The first real, working professional to believe in me out loud. He was my greatest influence. The news of his death was a huge shock, like a library burning down."

His hobbies included collecting 18th-century English theatre portrait figures and 19th-century Staffordshire pottery.

Ian Trigger died aged 71 in January 2010 in King's College Hospital in London after a long illness. He never married.
