= The Gamma People =

1956 film by John Gilling

- Theatrical release poster
- Directed by: John Gilling
- Screenplay by: John Gilling; John Gossage
- Story by: Robert Aldrich; Louis Pollock
- Produced by: John Gossage
- Starring: Paul Douglas; Eva Bartok
- Cinematography: Ted Moore
- Edited by: Jack Slade
- Music by: George Melachrino
- Color process: Black and white
- Production company: Warwick Films
- Distributed by: Columbia Pictures
- Release date: 30 January 1956
- Running time: 78 minutes
- Country: United Kingdom
- Language: English
- Budget: £85,060

The Gamma People is a 1956 British science fiction horror film produced by John Gossage, directed by John Gilling and starring Paul Douglas and Eva Bartok. The film, shot in Imst, Austria, was distributed by Columbia Pictures and evolved from a script treatment originally written in the early 1950s by Robert Aldrich. The Gamma People was released theatrically in January 1956 in the UK, and played later in 1956 in the U.S. as a double feature with the 1956 British science fiction film 1984.

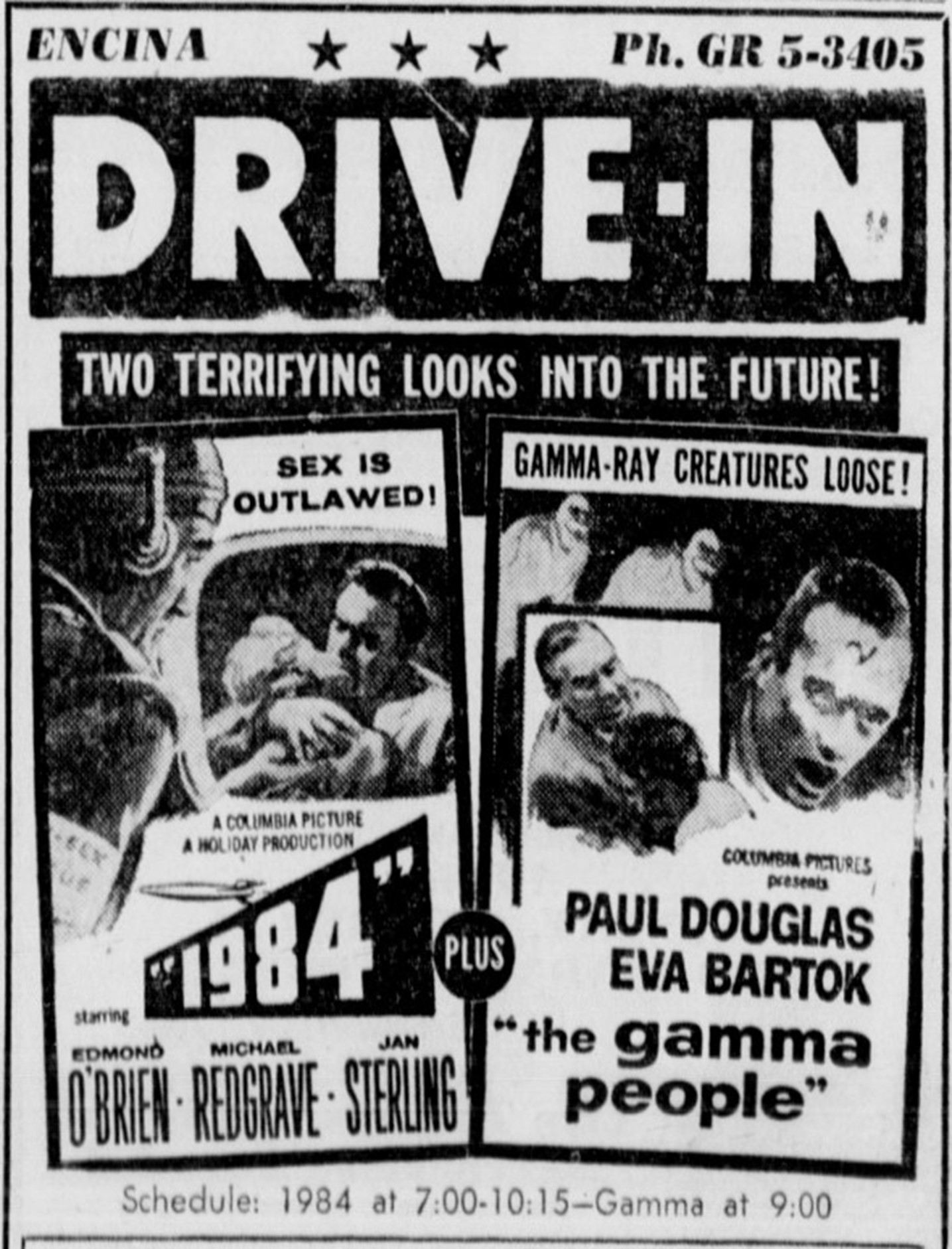
Poster for a 1956 double feature with 1984.

== Plot ==
A railroad passenger car carrying a reporter and his photographer mysteriously breaks away from its locomotive, accidentally ending up on a remote sidetrack in Gudavia, an isolated Ruritanian-style, one-village dictatorship. The newsmen discover a mad scientist using gamma rays to turn the country's youth into either geniuses or subhumans.

== Cast ==
- Paul Douglas as Mike Wilson
- Eva Bartok as Paula Wendt
- Leslie Phillips as Howard Meade
- Walter Rilla as Boronski
- Philip Leaver as Koerner
- Martin Miller as Lochner
- Michael Caridia as Hugo Wendt
- Pauline Drewett as Hedda Lochner
- Jocelyn Lane as Anna
- Olaf Pooley as Bikstein
- Rosalie Crutchley as Frau Bikstein
- Leonard Sachs as Telegraph Clerk
- Paul Hardtmuth as Hans
- Cyril Chamberlain as Graf

== Production ==
In June 1951, Irving Allen announced he would make The Gamma People in Austria with Brian Donlevy and Virginia Grey. It was based on a screenplay by Oliver Crawford and a story by Louis Pollock. Allen said the script was about German scientific experiments during the war which caused cells to mutate. He said he had finance from the United States and Austria. Allen did a location trip to Austria in July.

In December 1951 Allen announced he had formed Warwick Productions with Albert Broccoli, but that he still intended to make The Gamma People with Robert Aldrich. Dick Powell was slated to star.

The film would not be made for another three years. Paul Douglas was cast in the lead and Warwick wanted Trevor Howard to co-star. Filming took place in Austria in July 1955. Patricia Medina was meant to co-star, but then was called in for another commitment, on a Sam Katzman film. Eva Bartók took her place. The movie was Warwick's one attempt at science fiction.

Writer Louis Pollock would be blacklisted for five years, having been confused for Los Angeles clothier, Louis Pollack, who refused to give testimony to the House Un-American Activities Committee.

== See also ==
- List of British films of 1956
