= Percy's Progress =

1974 British comedy film by Ralph Thomas

- Film poster
- Directed by: Ralph Thomas
- Written by: Sid Colin; Harry H. Corbett; Ian La Frenais
- Produced by: Betty E. Box
- Starring: Leigh Lawson; Elke Sommer; Judy Geeson; Denholm Elliott; Adrienne Posta; Julie Ege; Vincent Price
- Cinematography: Tony Imi
- Edited by: Roy Watts
- Music by: Tony Macaulay
- Distributed by: EMI Film Distributors
- Release date: 18 August 1974
- Country: United Kingdom
- Language: English

Percy's Progress (US title: It's Not the Size That Counts) is a 1974 British comedy film directed by Ralph Thomas and starring Leigh Lawson, Elke Sommer, Denholm Elliott, Judy Geeson and Harry H. Corbett. It was written by Sid Colin, Harry H. Corbett and Ian La Frenais. The film is a sequel to Percy (1971).

It was the last film from producer Betty Box.

Harry H. Corbett's character was closely modelled on British prime minister Harold Wilson, down to using well-known Wilson phrases such as "thirteen years of Tory misrule" and speaking with a distinct Yorkshire accent.

== Plot ==
Percy is known in England as the man who had the world's first penis transplant, and is exceptionally well endowed. His rampant conquests of married women cause him to flee, to escape incarceration.

A chemical, PX123, is accidentally released into the world's water supply rendering all men impotent. Percy is unaware that he is the only man on earth who can achieve an erection because he was in hiding from the law at sea, drinking nothing but champagne.

When Percy goes ashore to relieve his year-long sexual tension at a brothel, he gains the attention of the British press and subsequently the British government, who then want to use him to repopulate the world. An international pageant is held to find each country's "Miss Conception" representative. At the same time, a team of doctors work to find an antidote to the effects of PX123.

== Cast ==
- Leigh Lawson as Percy Edward Anthony
- Elke Sommer as Clarissa
- Denholm Elliott as Sir Emmanuel Whitbread
- Judy Geeson as Dr. Fairweather
- Harry H. Corbett as Prime Minister
- Vincent Price as Stavos Mammonian
- Adrienne Posta as PC 217 (Iris)
- Julie Ege as Miss Hanson
- Barry Humphries as Dr. Anderson/Australian TV lady - Dame Edna Everage(it's a dead giveaway it's Dame Edna cause she speaks of her husband Norm) classic Barry!
- James Booth as Jeffcot
- Milo O'Shea as Dr. Klein
- Ronald Fraser as Bleeker
- Anthony Andrews as Catchpole
- Bernard Lee as Barraclough
- Madeline Smith as Miss UK
- Judy Matheson as Maria
- Alan Lake as Derry Hogan
- George Coulouris as Professor Godowski
- Jenny Hanley as Miss Teenage Lust
- Carol Hawkins as Maggie
- T. P. McKenna as news editor
- Anthony Sharp as judge
- Alan Tilvern as General Dodds
- Minah Bird as Miss America
- Luis De Jesus as the dwarf (in additional American release footage)

== Production ==
Betty Box says in her autobiography that they only agreed with Nat Cohen to make a sequel to Percy (1971) if he financed a film about Byron and Shelley, to be called The Reckless Years. However, Cohen reneged on the deal once Percy's Progress was made.

The film was based on an idea by Sid Collin.

The lead role went to Leigh Lawson who Ralph Thomas called "the best young actor around who hasn't already established himself. We saw dozens of good-looking, virilie young actors but we decided that Leigh had the look that we liked."

Filming started in January 1974 and took place at Elstree Studios and on the island of Cyprus. "We're not out for cheap laughs," said Thomas. "Just loud ones."

== Release ==
The US version of the film includes several additional scenes shot by the American distributor, which include an opening scene of a penis transplant operation, and a scene in which a dwarf, played by Luis De Jesus, the star of Blood Sucking Freaks (1976), is seen jumping out of a woman's bed, leaving her to say the film's American title, "It's not the size that counts."

== Critical reception ==
The Daily Mirror said "the laughter is still all too frequently of the nervous variety" but said there were "some genuinely funny moments" and "remarkably funny performances."

The Daily Telegraph criticised the "ponderous direction" and the "yawningly repetitive and emphatic script".

The Monthly Film Bulletin wrote:

It's now three years since Ralph Thomas and Betty Box made their first leeringly coy foray into sex comedy; this sequel to Percy finds them maintaining the same approach, with the same jejune results. Their chosen tactic is to beat around the bush (a joke which, oddly, no-one uses): the movie's main protagonist is kept securely locked behind trousers or below the frame-line, and words of four letters rarely have more than their first one uttered. The sexual innuendo on which music halls and Donald McGill thrived for years has lost its gusto; afficionados will find in Percy's Progress no more than a string of impotent jokes about impotence. In some ways, Sid Colin and Ian La Frenais seem aware of this, for they keep drifting into other areas for material – showbiz, TV, ethnic characteristics, and spy movies all have their fair share of parody. The comic focus is further blurred by every scene being decked out with familiar British faces. Some come out of the charades with a shred more dignity than others: James Booth's shambling, Harlesden-based private eye, Harry H. Corbett's silver-haired, H.P. Sauce-loving Prime Minister, Barry Humphries' implacable Edna Everage. Matters aren't improved by the misguided attempt to brighten the movie up with modish fripperies: the soundtrack is chock-a-block with unwanted songs, and the editor treats us to the full range of fancy wipes in the shapes of circles, squares, stars, and even pieces from a jigsaw puzzle. There is no such wantonness in the direction, however; Ralph Thomas' handling is as intensely routine as one has come to expect.

Alexander Walker wrote in his Evening Standard column in 1974 that the film is "just about the deepest depth ever plumbed by the once considerable and now nearly contemptible British film industry in its resolute search for the lowest kind of taste among the thickest kind of people."
