= Habeas Corpus (play) =

1973 play written by Alan Bennett

Habeas Corpus is a stage comedy in two acts by the English author Alan Bennett. It was first performed at the Lyric Theatre in London on 10 May 1973, with Alec Guinness in the central role. It ran, with cast changes, until 10 August 1974. The Broadway production that followed was less successful, running for less than three months. The play has been revived several times since then, in London and elsewhere.

The action revolves around the (generally) thwarted libidos of the principal characters. The title of the play is an old legal term habeas corpus, which translates from Latin as "you may have the body".

== Background ==
Having made his reputation as a co-writer of and performer in Beyond the Fringe, Bennett turned to writing full-length plays. Habeas Corpus was his third to be staged in the West End. It followed Forty Years On (1968) and Getting On (1971), which were described by the critic Michael Billington as "two elegiac comedies about the decline of England". In the new play Bennett's comedy became farcical: Billington called it "a gorgeously vulgar but densely plotted farce".

== Original cast ==
- Arthur Wicksteed, a General Practitioner – Alec Guinness
- Muriel Wicksteed, his wife – Margaret Courtenay
- Dennis Wicksteed, their son – Christopher Good
- Constance Wicksteed, the doctor's sister – Phyllida Law
- Mrs Swabb, a cleaning lady – Patricia Hayes
- Canon Throbbing, a celibate – Roddy Maude-Roxby
- Lady Rumpers, a white settler – Joan Sanderson
- Felicity Rumpers, her daughter – Madeline Smith
- Mr Shanks, a sales representative – Andrew Sachs
- Sir Percy Shorter, a leading light in the medical profession – John Bird
- Mr Purdue, a sick man – Mike Carnell

Directed by Ronald Eyre, designed by Derek Cousins; music by Carl Davis. In February 1974 Robert Hardy succeeded Guinness as Dr Wicksteed, and the author took over the role of Mrs Swabb.

== Plot ==
The action takes place in and around the Wicksteeds' house in Hove, on the south coast of England.

Mrs Swabb, who combines the functions of cleaner and all-knowing Fate, introduces the main characters. Wicksteed is 53, has an eye for the ladies and lacks ambition; his wife, Muriel, is a more assertive figure; their son, Dennis, is a wimpish hypochondriac, frustrated at his lack of a girlfriend; Connie is a flat-chested spinster who secretly longs to be sexually alluring; Sir Percy Shorter, President of the British Medical Association, was once Muriel's sweetheart and he bears a grudge against Wicksteed for cutting him out; Lady Rumpers is a returning expatriate, concerned for the purity of her beautiful daughter Felicity; Canon Throbbing is anxious to abandon his celibate state, which he finds a strain to keep up.

Meeting Felicity for the first time, Wicksteed is instantly consumed with lust for her, and attempts to arrange a tête-à-tête. Muriel finds her old feelings for Shorter rekindled and she too plots a rendezvous. A parcel arrives for Connie: it contains a pair of false breasts. Felicity makes a pass at Dennis and they go off together. Mr Shanks, the fitter from the false-breast manufacturer, arrives and mistaking Muriel for his client rhapsodises about and handles her substantial bust, until realising his mistake. Muriel, aroused to a predatory frenzy, pursues Shanks until interrupted by the arrival of Shorter, who misreading the situation injects Shanks with a powerful tranquilliser. Connie has put on her padded breasts, which make her feel suddenly attractive and confident to the point of brazenness. She mistakes Shorter for the fitter, and invites him to handle her bust. He is aroused and is discovered trouserless by Canon Throbbing, whom he attempts to tranquillise, pursuing him offstage with a hypodermic. Dennis and Felicity declare their intention to marry, but he is sent away by Wicksteed, who then attempts to seduce Felicity. Shorter catches him in the act and threatens to have him disciplined and barred from medical practice. Muriel joins in the denunciation and the uproar is increased by a suicide attempt by Wicksteed's patient Mr Purdue, who is trying to hang himself as Lady Rumpers enters.

Act Two continues the action from the same point. Lady Rumpers removes Felicity, Muriel tells Wicksteed to leave the family home, Throbbing and Shorter argue about which of them is to marry Connie until she enters without her prominent false bust, at which Shorter renounces her. Muriel relents and allows Wicksteed to remain, provided he resumes his long-neglected conjugal duties. Shanks comes round from the tranquilliser administered by Shorter and denounces Muriel as a sex-maniac. Wicksteed tells her that it is now she who must leave the family home. Lady Rumpers arrives to remove Felicity, who has returned to find Dennis. It emerges that Felicity has just had sex with Dennis. She finds him repulsive, and has agreed to marry him only because she is already pregnant, wants an official father for her child, and has been led to believe that Dennis has a fatal illness that will soon leave her as a widow. Lady Rumpers is aghast and reveals that history is repeating itself: she was seduced when young and made a marriage of convenience to give Felicity a legal father. Shorter makes a casual comment that leads to the discovery that he was the seducer and is Felicity's father. Wicksteed, having the upper hand, forces Shorter to back down over his disciplinary threat. It emerges that Dennis's imagined fatal illness is real, and Felicity agrees to go ahead with the marriage. Shanks comes across Connie adjusting her padded breasts and they run off together. Throbbing is again left frustrated, and Wicksteed is left alone to reflect on the transience of human life and the importance of seizing sexual opportunities whenever possible: "He whose lust lasts, lasts longest". The stage goes dark; a spotlight plays on Wicksteed, who "dances alone in the spotlight until he can dance no more."

== Revivals ==
A Broadway production opened in November 1975 and ran until February 1976. It starred Donald Sinden as Wicksteed, with a cast including June Havoc, Celeste Holm, Jean Marsh, Ian Trigger, Rachel Roberts and Richard Gere. The author attributed the comparative failure of the production – a run of 95 performances – to the heavily naturalistic staging by Frank Dunlop and Carl Toms, which he felt slowed down the action. The London production had been on a bare stage with only three chairs; Bennett thought this the only way of staging the work: "There is just enough text to carry the performers on and off, provided they don't dawdle. If they have to negotiate doors or stairs or potted plants or get anywhere except into the wings, then they will be stranded halfway across the stage, with no line left with which to haul themselves off".

Later revivals have included productions by Sam Mendes, with Jim Broadbent as Wicksteed (Donmar, London, 1996), Peter Hall, with James Fleet (Theatre Royal, Bath, 2006); David Thacker, with Rob Edwards (Octagon, Bolton, 2011); and Patrick Marber, with Jasper Britton (Menier Chocolate Factory, London, 2021–22).

== Critical reception ==
The play has divided critical opinion from the outset. In The Times, Irving Wardle thought that Bennett had difficulty in inventing a full-length play that would "sustain his wry, oblique talent", although this play was "his most successful experiment so far". In The Guardian, Billington's praise was less guarded, although he found "the diagrammatic neatness of the plotting ultimately becomes slightly oppressive". In The Daily Express Herbert Kretzmer commented that the author "tries too hard to do too much", although he predicted a long run for the play. When the play opened on Broadway, hostile notices outweighed the favourable. Clive Barnes of The New York Times pronounced the piece "slight and boring"; Howard Kissel commented more approvingly, observing, "farce is an enterprise whose esthetics are not always appreciated by the undiscerning".

The literary scholar Joseph O'Mealy writes that Habeas Corpus, like Tom Stoppard's Travesties, which was staged a year later, was strongly influenced by Oscar Wilde's The Importance of Being Earnest. O'Mealy finds echoes of Wilde's Lady Bracknell and Gwendolen in Lady Rumpers and Felicity, and of Wilde's linguistic absurdities in some of Bennett's dialogue. He identifies Joe Orton's 1969 farce What the Butler Saw as another influence.

Although the play is farcical for most of its length, the ending is equivocal, and some have seen Wicksteed's solitary, spotlit dance as a dance of death. Billington emphasises the farcical side of the piece, whereas the critic Ronald Bergan views it as "rather more a wake than a celebration".

== Sources ==
- Bennett, Alan (1973). Habeas Corpus. London: Faber and Faber. ISBN 978-0-571-10509-0.
- Hischak, Thomas. Broadway Plays and Musicals. Jefferson: McFarland. ISBN 978-0-7864-5309-2.
- O'Mealy, Joseph (2013). Alan Bennett: A Critical Introduction. London: Routledge. ISBN 978-1-135-69762-4.
