= Erricos Andreou =

Greek film director and screenwriter (1938–2023)

- Born: 15 December 1938; Athens, Greece
- Died: 21 January 2023 (aged 84); Athens, Greece
- Occupations: Film director, screenwriter
- Spouse: Nora Valsami (m. 1973)
- Children: 1

Erricos Andreou (also Errikos Andreou; Greek: Ερρίκος Ανδρέου; 15 December 1938 – 21 January 2023) was a Greek film director and screenwriter known for such films as The Hook, Act of Reprisal and Fatal Relationship.

== Life ==
Erricos Andreou was born in Athens on 15 December 1938. He grew up in Johannesburg, South Africa, where he studied Art History and English Literature at an English-speaking university before pursuing screenwriting and directing in Rome.

Erricos directed his first film, Nightmare (Efialtis) in 1961, which was recognized at the New Delhi Film Festival and the Thessaloniki Film Festival. He went on to direct several other films, winning awards for his directing at various film festivals. Erricos also worked as an assistant director on international productions before turning to television directing in the late 1970s. He died on 21 January 2023, after months in hospital suffering serious health problems.
