= An Act of Reprisal =

1964 film

- Directed by: Erricos Andreou; Robert Tronson
- Written by: John Vlahos
- Produced by: Wilbur Stark
- Starring: Ina Balin; Jeremy Brett; Kostas Kazakos; Yorgos Moutsios
- Cinematography: Basil Maros
- Edited by: Barry Malkin
- Production company: Wilbur Stark Productions
- Release date: 1964
- Running time: 92 minutes
- Country: United States
- Language: English

An Act of Reprisal (also known as Antekdhikissi ) is an American drama film directed by Erricos Andreou and Robert Tronson and starring Ina Balin, Jeremy Brett and Giannis Voglis. It was written by John Vlahos. The film depicts a romance set against the backdrop of Cypriot attempts to gain independence from Britain in the 1950s.

The film was produced in 1964, but was not released in theaters until 1991.

== Cast ==
- Jeremy Brett as Harvey Freeman, British Military Officer
- Ina Balin as Eleni
- Donald Douglas as Inspector Stanley (as Don Douglas)
- Arris Yallelis as Manoli
- Dimitri Starenios as the Mukhtar
- Giannis Voglis as Father Chrysostum (as Yanni Voglis)
- Dimitris Nikolaidis as Nico (as Dimitri Nicoliades)
- Nicos Lykometros as Stellios
- Kostas Kazakos as Petro (as Costas Kozakos)
- George Moutsious as Ali
- Andreas Filiipedes as Constantine

== Reception ==
Michael Wilmington wrote in The Los Angeles Times: “An Act of Reprisal ... is a shelved film, unseen for more than 25 years. Neither negligible nor meretricious, it’s grown into a likable period piece. Shot in Cyprus in 1964 for about $300,000, it’s a romantic-political melodrama, from a Christian-liberal perspective, that turns on a simple Romeo-Juliet, universal brotherhood theme. ... If it were being reviewed on its release, “Reprisal” might be a ripe target for the sort of critics who regularly savaged Jules Dassin or Stanley Kramer’s message melodramas. But as a 26-year-old movie that had virtually no release beyond some TV syndication, there’s something weirdly impressive about it. An Act of Reprisal may be obvious, but it’s never boring. It has potentially provocative themes, lively acting and perhaps most impressively, evocative black-and-white landscape cinematography by Basil Meros. ... It’s one of those movies in which every character, action, conversation or bit of landscape is symbolic. Everyone or everything exists to expose some crucial political or moral attitude."
