= Eva Bartok =

Hungarian-British actress (1927–1998)

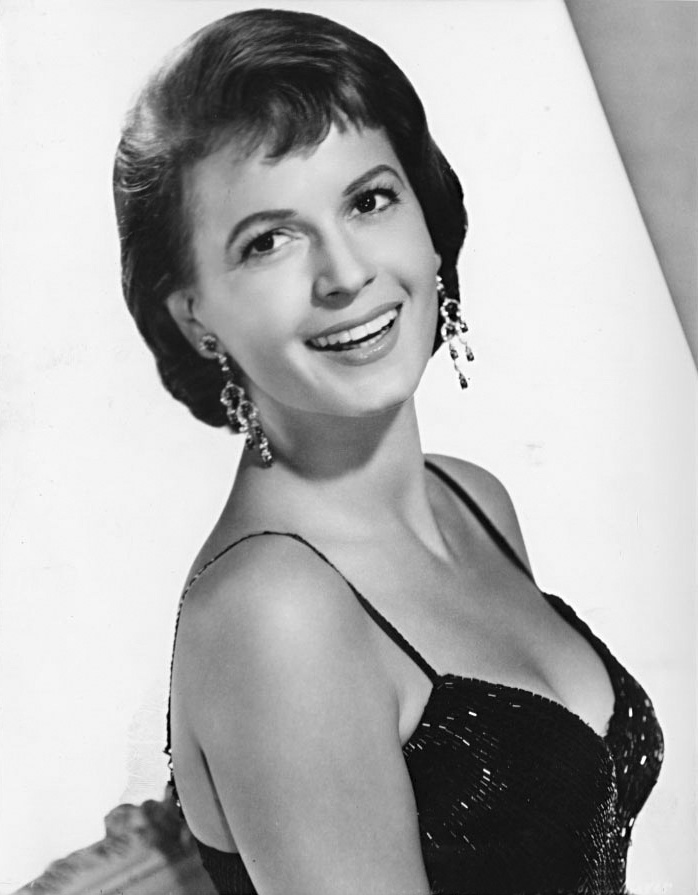
- Bartok in 1959
- Born: Éva Márta Szőke Ivanovics; 18 June 1927; Kecskemét, Kingdom of Hungary
- Died: 1 August 1998 (aged 71); London, England
- Occupation: Actress
- Years active: 1947–1966
- Spouse(s): Géza Kovács (annulled); Alexander Paal (1948–1950; divorced); William Wordsworth (1951–1955; divorced); Curd Jürgens (1955–1956; divorced); Dag Molin (1980–1983; divorced)
- Partner(s): Frank Sinatra; David Mountbatten, 3rd Marquess of Milford Haven
- Children: 1

Éva Márta Szőke Ivanovics (18 June 1927 – 1 August 1998), known professionally as Eva Bartok, was a Hungarian-British actress. She began acting in films in 1950, and her last credited appearance was in 1966. She acted in more than 40 American, British, German, Hungarian, French, and Israeli films. She is best known for appearances in Blood and Black Lace, The Crimson Pirate, The Gamma People, Operation Amsterdam, and Ten Thousand Bedrooms.

== Early life ==
Bartok was born Éva Márta Szőke Ivanovics in Kecskemét, Hungary, to a Jewish father and a Catholic mother. As a young child, she performed in school productions from the age of six, and later in charity events and for wounded soldiers during the Second World War.

Following the outbreak of the war, her father stayed in Budapest. Bartok and her mother moved to live in Kecskemét, to the south of the city, where her mother had relatives. Her father would visit them on Sundays, but later disappeared without a trace during the Nazi period.

To avoid persecution as the daughter of a Jewish father, the teenage Bartok was forced aged 15 to gain protection by marrying Géza Kovács, a Hungarian officer who had Nazi connections.

Kovács disappeared following the occupation of Hungary by the Communists. Bartok was able to get her marriage annulled, on the grounds of coercion of a minor.

== Career ==
Following the end of the Second World War, Bartok decided to enter the acting profession, and successfully sat an examination at the Drama Centre in Budapest. One of the examiners was the director of the prominent Belvárosi Szinház theatre, and he was impressed enough to, in 1945, offer Bartok a three-year contract. She made her professional debut in a performance of J. B. Priestley's A Conway család (Time and the Conways), which ran at the Belvárosi Szinház for three months. She also performed at the Nemzeti Kamara in 1947. She then performed in Gáspár Margit's Új Isten Thébában (New God in Thebes) in 1946, followed by Áron Tamási's drama Hullámzó vőlegény in 1947, George Bernard Shaw's Androkles és az oroszlánok (Androcles and the Lion), and Jean-Paul Sartre's A tisztességtudó utcalány (The Respectful Prostitute).

She first appeared in front of the camera in the 1947 Hungarian film Prophet of the Fields which was banned by the communist censors for political reasons.

Feeling threatened and persecuted by the new Communist regime in Hungary, she asked for help from Hollywood-based Hungarian producer Alexander Paal, who had been a friend of her father. Paal arranged a "passport marriage", and took her to London. Bartok was later able to smuggle her mother out of Hungary, via Austria and Germany, to eventually settle her in France. As one of its producers, Paal was able to arrange for Bartok to appear in the British-Italian international co-production drama film A Tale of Five Cities (which was released as A Tale of Five Women in the US). It was filmed in 1948, but due to financial difficulties, it was not released until 1951. As her surname would have been an hindrance to Western audiences, she changed her professional name to "Bartok", after the well-known Hungarian composer Béla Bartók. After divorcing Paal, Eva was introduced though the Hungarian expatriate community to fellow emigre Alexander Korda, who arranged for her to be put under contract to London Films. She received a small salary of £80 a month, and received the opportunity to audition for the studio's various film projects. At the same time, she undertook English language lessons. To assist in gaining parts on the advice of theatrical publicity agent William Wordsworth (who later became her third husband), she attracted attention by attending theatre premieres. As she had little money, she made most of her own dresses, displaying a flair for doing much with little.

Bartok came to the attention of an Italian stage producer who was in London looking for an English actress. He asked her to join his company with the provision that she could learn enough Italian in three weeks to perform a monologue in a variety show that incorporated singing, dancing, comedians, magicians, acrobats and novelty acts. With Korda's permission Bartok flew to Rome to join the show's rehearsals prior to the show opening in December 1951 at the Teatro Manzoni in Milan. The show was a success and over the following four months there were performances in Florence, Venice, Genoa and other cities, ending with a six-week long run in Rome at the Teatro Quirino.

In 1951, A Tale of Five Cities was finally released in the United Kingdom. It was seen by actor-producer Burt Lancaster and director Robert Siodmak, who were visiting England, looking for an actress to play opposite Lancaster as his romantic interest, Consuelo, in the upcoming production of the comedy-adventure film The Crimson Pirate. Impressed by Bartok's performance and appearance, they telegraphed her in Italy, asking for her to attend a screen test. Bartok, by now wary of countless unsuccessful auditions, replied: "No test. Send script." To her surprise, she was offered the role, and was asked to report for location shooting on the island of Ischia. In total, she spent over three months working on the project.

Also in 1952, Bartok appeared alongside Richard Todd in The Venetian Bird.

The success of The Crimson Pirate bought Bartok numerous role offers, though most were either in "B" movies or German-language movies. In 1953, Bartok made her first German film, Rummelplatz Der Liebe (Circus of Love), starring opposite actor Curd Jürgens. Their on-screen chemistry led to a demand for more collaborations, which came one after another in rapid succession: Der letzte Walzer, Meines Vaters Pferde I. Teil Lena und Nicoline, and Orient Express.

In 1955, Bartok acted on the stage in The Lovers, at the Opera House in Manchester, England. Directed by Sam Wanamaker, it was an adaptation and translation of Émile Zola's novel, Thérèse Raquin, by Marcelle Maurette. In 1957, Bartok appeared in the musical Ten Thousand Bedrooms, opposite Dean Martin. The movie was filmed in Italy and in Hollywood, and for a time, she resided in Los Angeles.

She made Operation Amsterdam in England.

Following that production, her best-known roles were in The Doctor of Stalingrad, which was released in 1958, and in 1961's It Can't Always Be Caviar, opposite O. W. Fischer.

In 1955, Bartok published a novel, Fighting Shadows, and in 1959, an autobiography, Worth Living For.

== Later life and death ==
Bartok had been introduced to the philosophy of Subud, while being treated for ovarian cancer in the late 1950s. As her career declined in the mid-1960s, she began spending more and more involvement with the spiritual movement, and ended up spending three years studying Subud principles near Jakarta, Indonesia. She later taught its philosophy in a school she opened in Honolulu.

In the last years of her life, she lived as a permanent paying guest in a small London hotel.

She died on 1 August 1998 at St. Charles's Hospital in London.

== Personal life ==
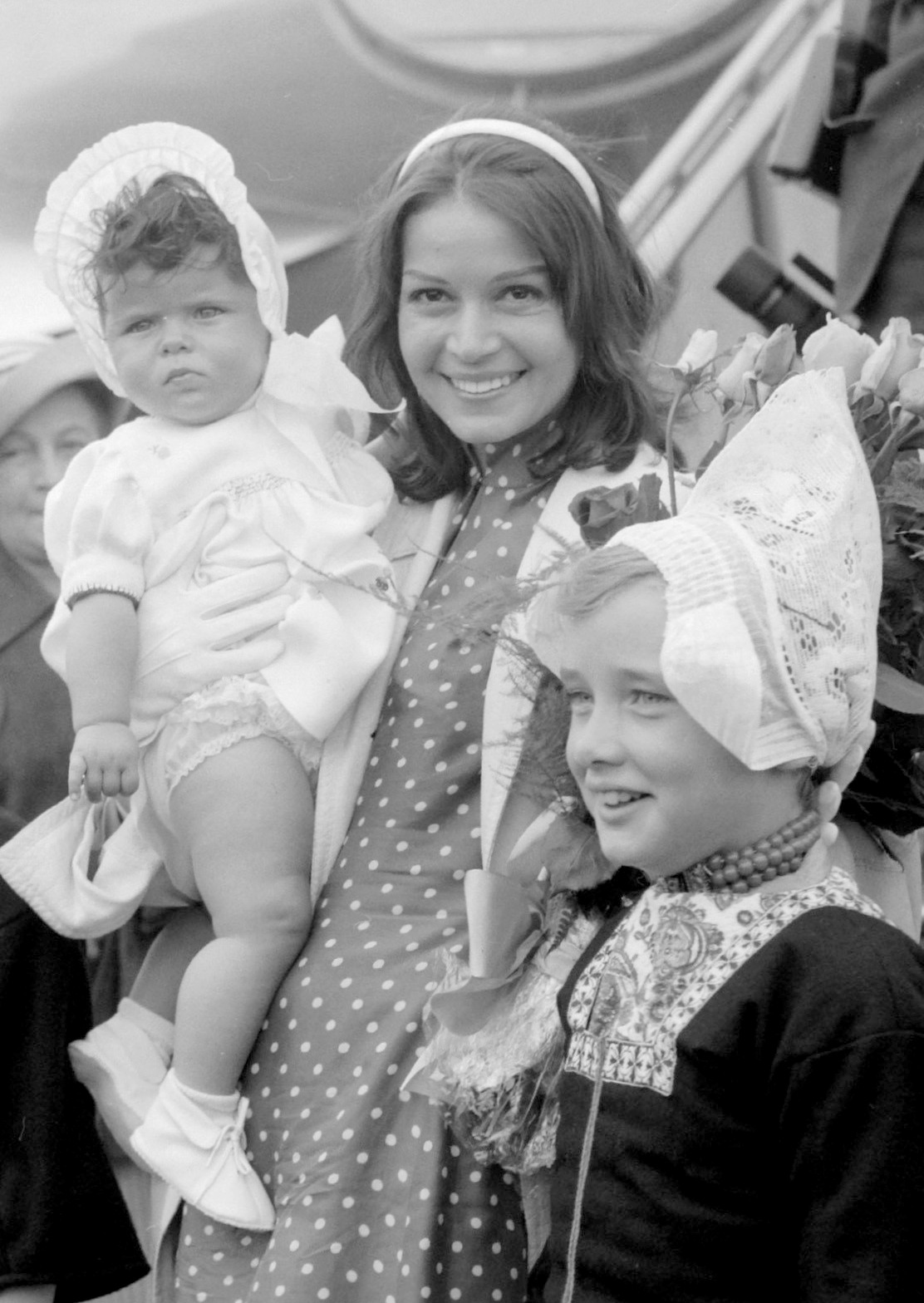
Bartok with daughter, Deana Jürgens (1958)

Bartok was married from 1944 to Hungarian officer Géza Kovács, until it was annulled after the Second World War, on the grounds of coercion of a minor.

Her second husband was the producer Alexander Paal, who had assisted her in her escape from Hungary in 1948. They divorced in 1951.

She acquired British citizenship through her third marriage to English theatrical publicity agent William "Bill" Wordsworth in 1952. Wordsworth was the great-great-grandson of the poet of the same name. That marriage fell apart, with him claiming that she had deserted him within a month of their marriage, to move to Rome to make a movie in 1952, but the divorce was not finalised until 7 March 1955, with Bartok not contesting Wordsworth's application.

She met the British aristocrat David Mountbatten, 3rd Marquess of Milford Haven, at a London dinner in 1952. They embarked on a high-profile relationship that lasted for several years. Romaine, Marchioness of Milford Haven, cited Bartok in her divorce petition. Mountbatten was prominent in the London demi-monde of the 1950s, which brought together a colourful mix of aristocrats and shadowy social climbers, such as osteopath Stephen Ward.

Her relationship with Mountbatten ended after Bartok began a relationship with German actor Curd Jürgens when they acted in a movie together in Germany. Amidst great media interest, she married Jürgens on 13 August 1955 in Schliersee, Germany. It was Jürgens's third marriage. They divorced on 6 November 1956. Shortly after her marriage to Jürgens had ended, Bartok gave birth to a daughter, Deana, in London, on 7 October 1957.

Three decades later, Bartok claimed Deana's biological father was actually Frank Sinatra, as a result of a very brief affair in 1956 with him, following the break-up of Sinatra's marriage to Ava Gardner. Bartok had first met Frank Sinatra at a party while she was in Hollywood in 1955, while appearing in the film Ten Thousand Bedrooms, alongside Dean Martin. Sinatra never acknowledged that he was the father.

In 1980, Bartok married her fifth husband, the American producer Dag Molin, and lived with him in Los Angeles until their divorce in 1983.

== Selected filmography ==
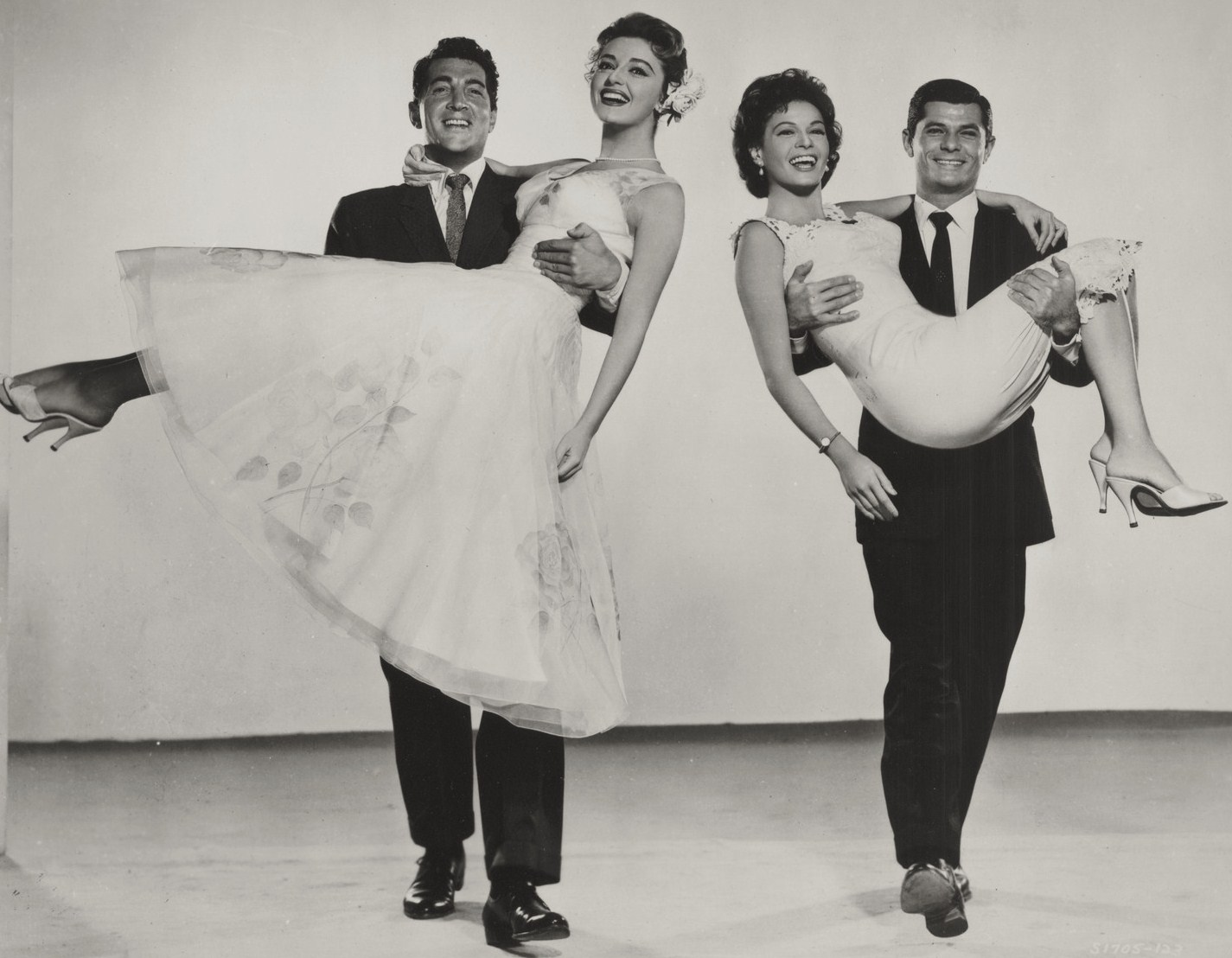
Publicity still for Ten Thousand Bedrooms, with Dean Martin holding Anna Maria Alberghetti, and Dewey Martin holding Bartok

- Prophet of the Fields (1947)
- Madeleine (1950) Uncredited.
- A Tale of Five Cities (1951) It had the alternative titles of Passaporto per l'oriente in Italy and A Tale of Five Women in the United States.
- The Crimson Pirate (1952)
- Venetian Bird (1952). Released in the US as The Assassin.
- Spaceways (1953)
- Park Plaza 605 (1953). Also known as Norman Conquest.
- The Last Waltz (1953) Filmed in German under the title Der letzte Walzer.
- Circus of Love (1954) Filmed in German under the title Rummelplatz Der Liebe.
- Meines Vaters Pferde I. Teil Lena und Nicoline (1954)
- Front Page Story (1954)
- Victoria and Her Hussar (1954). Filmed in German under the title Victoria und ihr Husar.
- Orient Express (1954)
- Break in the Circle (1955)
- Special Delivery (1955). Released in German with title Von Himmel Gefallen.
- Dunja (English: Her Crime Was Love, 1955)
- The Gamma People (1956)
- Without You All Is Darkness (1956). Filmed in German under the title Ohne dich wird es Nacht).
- Through the Forests and Through the Trees (1956). Filmed in German under the title Durch die Wälder, durch die Auen.
- Ten Thousand Bedrooms (1957)
- The Doctor of Stalingrad (1958). Filmed in German under the title Der Arzt von Stalingrad.
- Madeleine Tel. 13 62 11 (a.k.a. Naked in the Night, 1958)
- Operation Amsterdam (1959)
- Twelve Hours By the Clock (1959)
- SOS Pacific (1959)
- Ein Student ging vorbei (1960)
- Beyond the Curtain (1960)
- Ti aspetterò all'inferno (1960)
- Blind Justice (1961). Filmed in German under the title Unter Ausschluß der Öffentlichkeit.
- It Can't Always Be Caviar (1961)
- This Time It Must Be Caviar (1961)
- Aurora Marriage Bureau (1962)
- Avventura al motel (1963)
- A Holiday Like Never Before (1963)
- Blood and Black Lace (1964)
- Sabina (1966)
