= Alexander Paal =

Hungarian film writer, director (1910–1972)

- Born: May 18, 1910; Budapest, Austria-Hungary
- Died: 8 November 1972 (aged 62); Madrid, Spain
- Occupations: Director; producer; writer
- Years active: 1935–1971
- Spouse: Eva Bartok (m. 1948; div. 1950)

Alexander Paal (May 18, 1910 – November 8, 1972) was a Hungarian film writer, director and producer. He considered one of the directors who were strongly influenced by the medieval European era.

== Early life and education ==
Paal was born in Budapest on May 18, 1910.

He was once married to Hungarian-British actress Eva Bartok from 1948 to 1950. According to the sources, Paal helped Bartok in escaping from communist-ruled Hungary by arranging a "passport marriage". Later, he arranged Bartok's travel to London and gave her the leading role in his film A Tale of Five Cities (1951). The marriage was dissolved in the year 1951.

== Filmography ==
=== Screenwriter ===
- A Tale of Five Cities (1951)
- Stolen Face (1952)

=== Director ===
- Columbus Discovers Kraehwinkel (1954)

=== Producer ===
- Cloudburst (1951)
- A Tale of Five Cities (1951)
- Mantrap (1953)
- Four Sided Triangle (1953)
- Three Cases of Murder (1955)
- The Golden Head (1964)
- The Heroine (1967) – An incomplete film by Orson Welles, considered to be lost
- Countess Dracula (1971), this film is supposed to be his last one.

=== Actor ===
- Budai cukrászda (1935)
