= Cloudburst (1951 film) =

British film by Francis Searle

- Theatrical release poster
- Directed by: Francis Searle
- Written by: Leo Marks (story); Francis Searle
- Produced by: Anthony Hinds; Alexander Paal
- Starring: Robert Preston; Elizabeth Sellars; Sheila Burrell
- Cinematography: Walter J. Harvey; Peter Bryan
- Edited by: John Ferris
- Music by: Frank Spencer
- Production company: Hammer Film Productions
- Distributed by: Exclusive Films (UK); United Artists (USA)
- Release date: January 1952
- Running time: 92 minutes (UK); 83 minutes (US)
- Country: United Kingdom
- Language: English

Cloudburst is a 1951 British second feature ('B') crime drama film directed by Francis Searle, starring Robert Preston, Elizabeth Sellars, Harold Lang, Colin Tapley and Sheila Burrell. It was written by Searle and Leo Marks based on a story of the same name by Marks, a wartime cryptographer for the Special Operations Executive. It was produced by Hammer Films. Assistant director was Jimmy Sangster, Casting was handled by Michael Carreras, and Makeup was by Phil Leakey.

Production ran from Jan. 8, 1951 through Feb. 15, 1951, it was trade shown on June 21, 1951 and released to the ABC circuit in January of 1952. The film's release was held up due to censorship problems regarding Robert Preston's suicide scene in the original screenplay, which had to be re-shot for both the British and American prints. Co-producer Alexander Paal was hired for his ability to obtain American stars for future Hammer productions that would boost their box office attractiveness. Cloudburst featured their first American star, Robert Preston, and was also the first film Hammer produced at their Bray studio.

== Plot ==
John Graham, a World War II veteran and head of the Foreign Office cypher group, seeks revenge on the driver and passenger of a hit-and-run automobile that struck and killed his pregnant wife, Carol. The two people in the car (Mickey and Lorna) were fleeing a robbery when they heedlessly ran over Graham's wife. Graham takes a leave of absence from his job so that he can track down and kill the hit-and-run couple. He winds up killing both of them in a fit of rage, running his car over their bodies multiple times. When the police catch up with Graham, in the original script, he commits suicide by drinking poison, but the British censor forced Hammer to rewrite the film's ending so that the poison does not kill him, and he is led away to prison. Still the censors were not happy with the amount of vigilante violence that remained in the final cut of the film.

== Cast ==
- Robert Preston as John Graham
- Elizabeth Sellars as Carol Graham
- Colin Tapley as Inspector Davis
- Sheila Burrell as Lorna Dawson
- Harold Lang as Mickie Fraser / Kid Python
- Mary Germaine as Peggy Reece
- George Woodbridge as Sergeant Ritchie
- Lyn Evans as Chuck Peters
- Thomas Heathcote as Jackie
- Edith Sharpe as Mrs Reece
- Daphne Anderson as Kate
- Edward Lexy as Cardew
- James Mills as Thompson
- Noel Howlett as Johnson
- Martin Boddey as Desk Sergeant
- Stanley Baker in a small role

== Reception ==
The Monthly Film Bulletin wrote: "Violent and implausible thriller." Variety called it "palatable celluloid for filmgoers with a leaning, toward mellers."

Kine Weekly wrote: "Bizarre, yet holding 'death on the road' romantic melodrama. ... First-rate British attraction."

Leslie Halliwell wrote "Watchable potboiler."

In British Cinema of the 1950s: The Decline of Deference, Harper and Porter wrote: "Cloudburst is the first Hammer B-feature aimed at the Americans, and it is also the first one in which class issues have been rendered invisible. Class origins are an irrelevance in the film's world of passionate individualism. ... The film, directed by Hammer regular Francis Searle, is stylishly substantial, with a marvellous roundness and symmetry. Cloudburst jettisons conventional morality, and proceeds to a satisfying closure."
