= Ten Thousand Bedrooms =

1957 film by Richard Thorpe

- Directed by: Richard Thorpe
- Written by: Art Cohn; William Ludwig; Leonard Spigelgass; László Vadnay
- Produced by: Joe Pasternak
- Starring: Dean Martin; Anna Maria Alberghetti; Eva Bartok
- Cinematography: Robert J. Bronner
- Edited by: John McSweeney Jr.
- Music by: Nicholas Brodszky; George Stoll; Robert Van Eps
- Distributed by: Metro-Goldwyn-Mayer
- Release date: April 3, 1957 (U.S.)
- Running time: 113 minutes
- Language: English
- Budget: $1,799,000
- Box office: $1,705,000

Ten Thousand Bedrooms is a 1957 American romantic comedy film directed by Richard Thorpe and starring Dean Martin, Anna Maria Alberghetti and Eva Bartok. Shot in Metrocolor and CinemaScope, it was Martin's first film in the wake of the dissolution of his partnership with Jerry Lewis.

== Plot ==
Millionaire hotel mogul Ray Hunter flies to Rome to buy another property, the Regent. He is picked up at the airport by lovely Maria Martelli, who works for the hotel's owner, the Countess Alzani.

Ray is reproached by the Countess for the impersonal way he buys up hotels this way, piling up "ten thousand bedrooms" and replacing employees without a second thought. He sincerely promises not to do so with the staff of the Regent.

During the drive back into central Rome, Maria mocks Ray about his buying of numerous hotels. Instead of rebuking her, Ray appreciates her frankness, causing Maria to apologize and volunteer to be his translator that afternoon during staff introductions. When Maria stops briefly at her home to change, Ray meets the Martelli family, including Papà Vittorio and his other daughters. Maria's youngest sister, 18-year-old Nina, takes an almost immediate liking to Ray.

Maria's current romantic interest is Anton, a poor Polish count who fancies himself a sculptor. Nina, meanwhile, tries to catch Ray's eye, while his private pilot Mike is trying to catch hers.

Nina sees the sights with Ray and wants to marry him, so she asks her father for permission. Papa Martelli forbids it, saying in this family all of the eldest daughters must be married before the youngest can.

Ray tries to speed up that process. He sends for two eligible bachelors from America on the pretense of business. They are quickly introduced to two other sisters of Maria and Nina. But when he makes the mistake of buying Anton's artwork in order to make the poor count feel worthy of proposing to Maria, it backfires. Maria is furious and Ray apologizes with a kiss.

Suddenly realizing he is involved with the wrong sister, Ray is in a fix. At a party, Papa Martelli is rushed into saying Ray is engaged to daughter Nina, which upsets Mike so much that he decides to leave. Ray hurriedly urges Mike to stay and fight for the girl he loves.

It takes some doing, but everything finally works out. Ray finds a job for Anton that involves him traveling to Bombay for a long period of time. Meanwhile, he persuades Maria that he's sincere, and next thing you know, Papa Martelli is planning four weddings.

== Cast ==
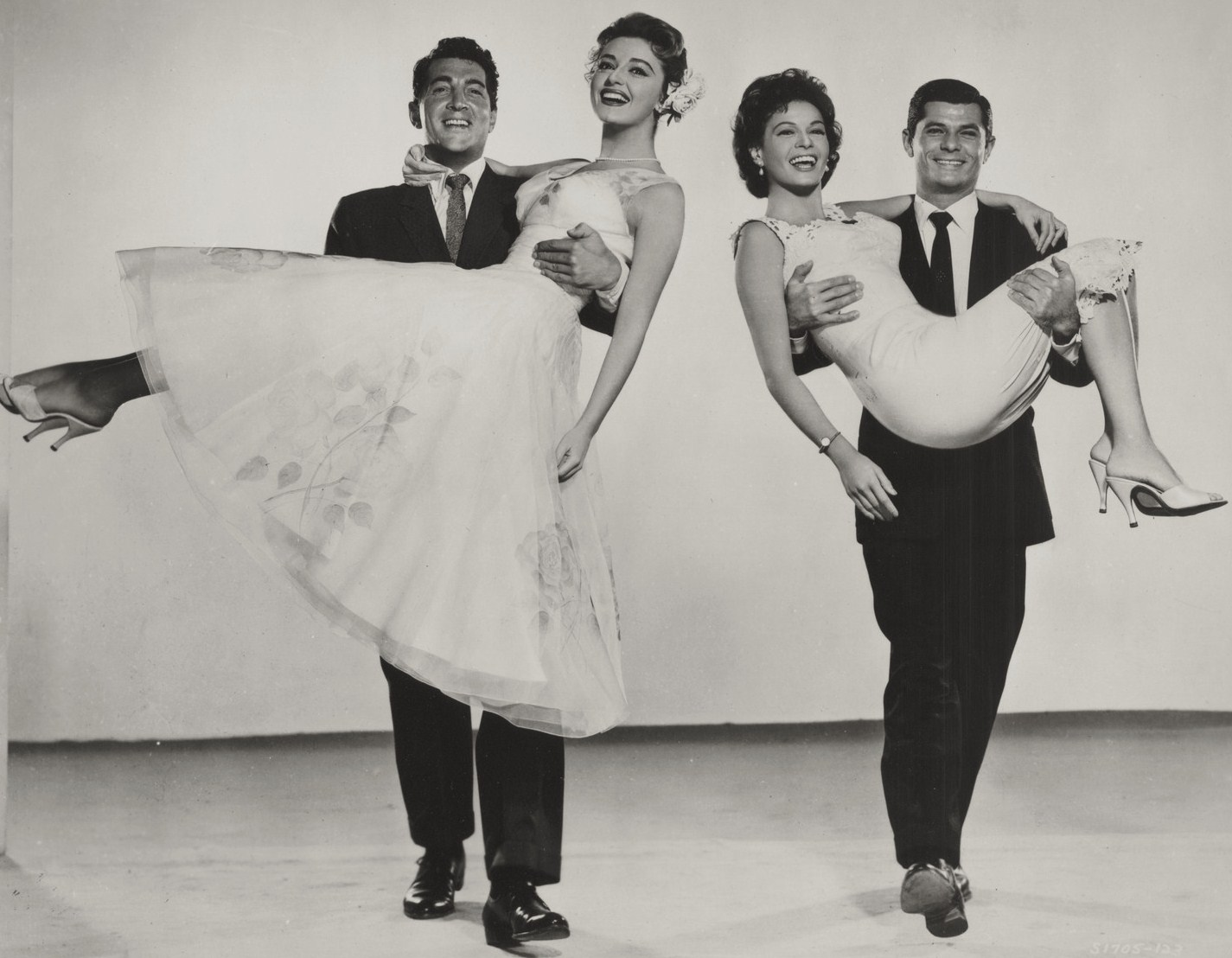
L. to R. : Dean Martin, Anna Maria Alberghetti, Eva Bartok & Dewey Martin in a 1957 publicity still for the movie.

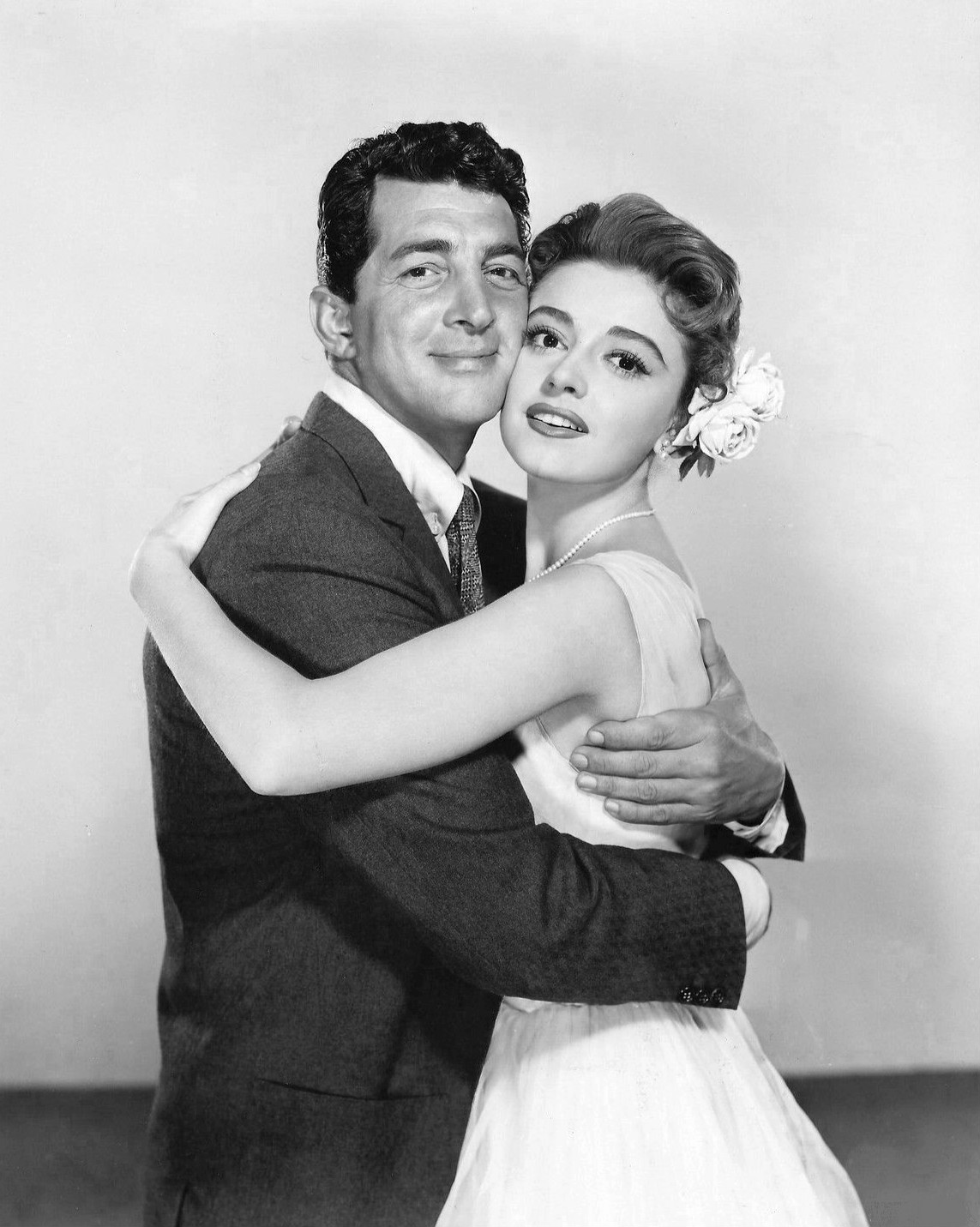
Dean Martin and Anna Maria Alberghetti in a 1956 publicity still.

| Actor | Role |
|---|---|
| Dean Martin | Ray Hunter |
| Anna Maria Alberghetti | Nina Martelli |
| Eva Bartok | Maria Martelli |
| Dewey Martin | Mike Clark |
| Walter Slezak | Papà Vittorio Martelli |
| Paul Henreid | Anton |
| Jules Munshin | Arthur |
| Marcel Dalio | Vittorio Cisini |
| Evelyn Varden | Countess Alzani |
| Lisa Montell | Diana Martelli |
| Betty Wand | Diana Martelli (singing voice) |
| Lisa Gaye | Ana Martelli |
| John Archer | Bob Dudley |
| Stephen Dunne | Tom Crandall |
| Dean Jones | Dan |

== Production ==
Laslo Vadnay wrote the original story “10,000 Bedrooms,” which Metro-Goldwyn-Mayer purchased in 1955 and then subsequently assigned him and Dwight Taylor the task of developing it into a screenplay.

The movie was filmed between mid-August and mid-September 1956 in Rome, Italy and then between September 27 and late-October 1956 at M-G-M’s studio in Culver City, California.

=== Supervisors ===
- Musical director: George E. Stoll
- Directing assistant: Robert Saunders
- Montage: John Sweeney Jr.
- Artist director: Randall Duell and William A. Horning

== Musical numbers ==
The film featured the following musical numbers:

1. "Guaglione", music by Giuseppe Fanciulli, lyrics by Nicola Salerno.
2. "Money Is a Problem", music by Nicholas Brodszky, lyrics by Sammy Cahn. Performed by Dean Martin and Jules Munshin.
3. "No One but You", music by Nicholas Brodszky, lyrics by Jack Lawrence.
4. "Only Trust Your Heart", music by Nicholas Brodszky, lyrics by Sammy Cahn. Performed by Dean Martin and Anna Marie Alberghetti.
5. "Rock Around the Clock", music and lyrics by Max C. Freedman and Jimmy De Knight
6. "Ten Thousand Bedrooms", music by Nicholas Brodszky, lyrics by Sammy Cahn.
7. "You I Love", music by Nicholas Brodszky, lyrics by Sammy Cahn.

== Reception ==
According to MGM records the film earned $955,000 in the US and Canada and $750,000 elsewhere, resulting in a loss of $1,196,000.
