= Minah Bird =

Nigerian actress (1950–1995)

- Detail of photo by Lewis Morley (1970) © National Portrait Gallery
- Born: Minah Ogbenyealu Bird; 11 March 1950; Nigeria
- Died: July 1995 (aged 45)
- Other name: Minah Uko

Minah Ogbenyealu Bird (also known as Mynah Bird and Minah Uko) (11 March 1950 – July 1995) was a Nigerian model and actress active in the United Kingdom in the 1970s.

== Early life ==
Bird was born in from Aba in Nigeria and was educated in Nigeria and Finland.

She appeared in several UK films of the 1970s.

Described as the "only major black starlet in British sex films", she vanished from public view from the late 1970s and was found dead in her Londonflat in Belgravia, London SW1; a few weeks after suffering an apparent heart attack in 1995.

== Career ==
Bird was listed as one of the "top black fashion models who paved the way for black women in fashion" alongside Iman and Grace Jones.

She appeared on the cover of Oz magazine in November 1970. She is credited with a series in the Sunday Mirror in the mid-1970s that birthed the trend of Kiss N Tell stories in newspapers.

== Filmography ==
Year	Film	Role
1971	Up Pompeii	Girl Bather (uncredited)
1972	The Love Box (aka Lovebox)	Black Girl ("New Colours" segment)
1972	Four Dimensions of Greta	Cynthia
1972	Layout for 5 Models	Maria
1974	Percy's Progress	Miss America
1974	Vampira aka Old Dracula	Rose
1974	It's Not the Size That Counts	Maria
1976	Alfie Darling	Gloria
1978	The Stud	Molly
1978	Play For Today (BBC TV) S9.E2: "Victims of Apartheid"	Clara
1979	The London Connection	Narcotics Agent
1979	A Nightingale Sang in Berkeley Square	Mavis (final film role)
