= Stolen Face =

1952 film by Terence Fisher

- Directed by: Terence Fisher
- Screenplay by: Martin Berkeley; Richard Landau
- Story by: Alexander Paal; Steven Vas
- Produced by: Anthony Hinds
- Starring: Paul Henreid; Lizabeth Scott; André Morell
- Cinematography: Walter J. Harvey
- Edited by: Maurice Rootes
- Music by: Malcolm Arnold; Bronwyn Jones
- Production company: Hammer Film Productions
- Distributed by: Exclusive Films (UK); Lippert Pictures (US)
- Release dates: 23 June 1952; (UK); June, 1952 (US)
- Running time: 72 minutes
- Country: United Kingdom
- Language: English

Stolen Face is a 1952 British film directed by Terence Fisher and starring Paul Henreid, Lizabeth Scott and André Morell. The screenplay was by Martin Berkeley and Richard Landau based on a story by Alexander Paal and Steven Vas. Jimmy Sangster was assistant director and Phil Leakey handled Makeup. Lead actors Henreid and Scott both were experiencing downturns in their careers and welcomed the chance to work in this film. It also featured Andre Morell's first work for Hammer. Filming began Oct. 29, 1951, and wrapped on December 4th. It was trade shown on April 12, 1952, and released at the Plaza on May 2nd, the first Hammer film ever to open at a prestigious West End cinema. This film was a preview of things to come for Hammer, with its borderline science-fiction theme and the involvement of director Terence Fisher, foreshadowing Hammer's later successes in the horror film genre.

== Plot ==
Lady Harringay arrives in her chauffeur-driven Rolls-Royce at the offices of plastic surgeon, Dr. Philip Ritter, in central London. She is disappointed when he tells her that he can do no more for her, since she has already had too many facelifts.

Ritter drives with a friend to Holloway Prison and interviews Lily Conover, a female convict whose face is badly scarred. He believes her disfigurement is the cause of her criminality and begins to consider treating her with plastic surgery. After almost having a car crash on the way back, he decides to take a holiday in the countryside.

At a country inn, he meets and soon falls in love with Alice Brent, a gifted and beautiful concert pianist. However, Alice is already engaged to be married to her manager David and, afraid to tell the truth, runs away, leaving Ritter devastated.

Back at his surgery, Ritter receives a phone call from Alice, who finally tells him of her engagement. Meanwhile, Ritter's new patient is Lily, now released from prison. The love-struck surgeon believes he can change her criminal ways by constructing her new face to resemble Alice's. After performing the operation, Ritter marries Lily, now a spitting image of Alice.

Unfortunately for Ritter, Lily has not changed her ways. She soon grows bored with her husband's sedate lifestyle, and returns to a life of crime and wild partying. She is reckless in her behaviour, and unabashedly flirts with other men, and he comes to despise her.

As Alice completes her latest concert tour, David guesses she is in love with someone else and calls off the engagement. Alice goes to see Ritter, but is stunned when he confesses what he had done to Lily. Lily sees Alice for the first time and, despite being aware that Ritter still loves the woman whose face she bears, she tells him she will never divorce him.

Upset at the mess he had made, Ritter sends Alice a letter, telling her of his plans to move from London to Plymouth. Ritter takes the train, but Lily follows him, and she becomes drunk and aggressive towards him. Alice believes Ritter is so upset he may harm Lily, or even kill her if provoked, and she too boards the same train. She arrives just as the two are arguing and engaged in a physical struggle as Ritter tries to prevent the intoxicated Lily from falling out of the carriage. As Alice enters, Lily tackles her, prompting Ritter to separate the two women; in the scuffle, Lily accidentally falls through the loose carriage door and out of the train.

Lily is soon discovered dead at the side of the tracks, her face horribly mutilated, and Ritter and Alice walk off together.

== Cast ==
- Paul Henreid as Dr. Philip Ritter
- Lizabeth Scott as Alice Brent / Lily Conover (after surgery)
- André Morell as David
- Mary Mackenzie as convict Lily Conover (before surgery)
- John Wood as Dr. John 'Jack' Wilson
- Arnold Ridley as Dr. Russell
- Susan Stephen as Betty
- Diana Beaumont as May
- Terence O'Regan as Pete Snipe
- Russell Napier as Det. Cutler
- Ambrosine Phillpotts as Miss Patten as Fur Department clerk
- Everley Gregg as Lady Millicent Harringay
- Cyril Smith as Alf Bixby, innkeeper
- Richard Wattis as Mr. Wentworth, store manager
- Dorothy Bramhall as Miss Simpson as receptionist
- Janet Burnell as Maggie Bixby
- Alexis France as Mrs. Emmett
- John Bull as Charles Emmett
- Bartlett Mullins as farmer
- Anna Turner as maid
- John Warren as railway guard
- Hal Osmond as photographer

== Production ==
The film was shot at Hammersmith's Riverside Studios with sets designed by art director Wilfred Arnold.

== Critical reception ==
In contemporary reviews Variety said: "Pacing is laborious though Henreid and Scott provide some substance. ... Picture's chances are mild."; Boxoffice wrote: "What started out as an admirably original and highly engrossing idea to background a dual-role performance was virtually ruined through mallet-handed scripting and direction, resulting in over-dramatic delineations and situations."

Leslie Halliwell reviewed the film as: "Quickie melodrama which proved fairly popular because of its Hollywood stars."

In British Sound Films: The Studio Years 1928–1959 David Quinlan rated the film as "mediocre" and wrote the one-word review: Grim.

The Radio Times Guide to Films gave the film 2/5 stars, writing: "Take this early Hammer melodrama with a ton of salt and you may enjoy its wild fantasy about sexual obsession and the incredible achievements of plastic surgery. Two 1940s stars, past their prime, were dragged to Britain to boost international sales."

Writing in his biography of Terence Fisher, Peter Hutchings says: "Stolen Face is [hard] to classify; sometimes linked with SF and horror because of its subject matter – a surgeon operating on a woman to transform her into a replica of another woman – it is probably more accurate to think of it as a rather perverse romantic melodrama."
