= Ten Minute Alibi (play) =

1933 play

- Original language: English
- Written by: Anthony Armstrong
- Genre: Crime thriller
- Setting: A flat in Bloomsbury, London

Premiere
- Date: 2 January 1933
- Place: Embassy Theatre, Swiss Cottage

Ten Minute Alibi is a 1933 crime thriller play by the British author Anthony Armstrong. It premiered at the Embassy Theatre in Swiss Cottage on 2 January 1933, before transferring to London's West End. It ran for 857 performances between 8 February 1933 and 26 January 1935, initially at the Haymarket Theatre before switching to the Phoenix Theatre. The London cast included Anthony Ireland, Robert Douglas, Bernard Lee, George Merritt, Charles Hickman, Celia Johnson, Jessica Tandy, Gillian Maude and Aileen Marson. It was directed by Sinclair Hill. A Broadway version at the Ethel Barrymore Theatre ran for 89 performances.

== Original Cast ==
- Roland Caswell as Hunter
- Anthony Ireland as Philip Sevilla
- Celia Johnson as Betty Findon
- Robert Douglas as Colin Derwent
- John Garside as Sir Miles Standing
- George Merritt as Detective-Inspector Pember
- T.G. Saville as Detective-Sergeant Brace
- Jon Godfrey as Restaurant Manager

The cast remained the same when the play transferred to the Haymarket Theatre.

== Adaptation ==
The play was first published in 1933 by Victor Gollancz Ltd. In 1934 Armstrong created a novelisation of the story published under the same title by Methuen. In 1935 this was in turn made into a film version directed by Bernard Vorhaus and starring Phillips Holmes, Aileen Marson and Theo Shall.

== Bibliography ==
- Goble, Alan. The Complete Index to Literary Sources in Film. Walter de Gruyter, 1999.
- Kabatchnik, Amnon. Blood on the Stage, 1925-1950: Milestone Plays of Crime, Mystery and Detection. Scarecrow Press, 2010.
- Wearing, J. P. The London Stage 1930–1939: A Calendar of Productions, Performers, and Personnel. Rowman & Littlefield, 2014.
- Willison, I.R. (ed.) The New Cambridge Bibliography of English Literature: Volume 4, 1900–1950. Cambridge University Press, 1972.
