= Aren't We All? =

Comic play by Frederick Lonsdale

Herbert Marshall and Marie Lohr in the premiere, 1923

Marshall and Julian Royce in the premiere

Aren't We All? is a stage play in three acts by Frederick Lonsdale. The plot of this drawing room comedy concerns the Hon William Tatham, whose wife catches him kissing another woman at a party, but she had an extramarital kiss of her own; meanwhile a society lady works to secure the hand of William's father, Lord Grenham.

The play premiered in London in 1923, has been revived both in the West End and on Broadway, and has been adapted for film, radio and television.

== Productions ==
The play premiered in London on 10 April 1923 at the Globe Theatre, running for 58 performances. The play was then seen on Broadway at the Gaiety Theatre on 21 May 1923. Despite warm reviews, the production lasted only 32 performances. A revival two years later at the same theatre lasted 16 performances.

Marie Lohr, who played the young Margot Tatham in the first production, returned to the play in a 1935 revival at the Court Theatre, this time playing the dowager role, Lady Frinton, in a cast in which the young Trevor Howard played Willie Tatham. Lohr reprised her role in a revival at the Theatre Royal, Haymarket in 1953; Ronald Squire played Lord Grenham, Jane Baxter and Ronald Howard played the Tathams and George Howe and Marjorie Fielding played the Lyntons. A revival at the Savoy Theatre, London in 1967 starred William Mervyn as Lord Grenham and Viola Keats as Lady Frinton. Also in the cast were Jane Downs (Margot Tatham), Charles Collingwood (Arthur Wells) and George Howe again playing the vicar.

A West End revival directed by Clifford Williams opened at the Haymarket on 3 June 1984, running until 3 November. It transferred to Broadway and opened on 29 April 1985 at the Brooks Atkinson Theatre, where it played a limited run of 93 performances.

Role	Original cast	1923 Broadway cast	1984 West End revival	1985 Broadway revival
Morton	E. Vivian Reynolds	George Tawde	Robert Gladwell	Peter Pagan
Hon Willie Tatham	Herbert Marshall	Hugh Huntley	Francis Matthews	Jeremy Brett
Lady Frinton	Ellis Jeffreys	Cynthia Brook	Claudette Colbert	Claudette Colbert
Arthur Wells	Charles Hickman	Denis Gurney	Timothy Peters	Steven Sutherland
Martin Steele	Patrick Gover	Timothy Huntley	Ben Bazell	John Patrick Hurley
Kitty Lake	Cyllene Moxon	Isabel Lamon	Annie Lambert	Leslie O'Hara
Lord Grenham	Julian Royce	Cyril Maude	Rex Harrison	Rex Harrison
Hon Margot Tatham	Marie Lohr	Alma Tell	Nicola Pagett	Lynn Redgrave
Roberts	E. A. Walker	F. Gatenby Bell	John Ingram	George Ede
Angela Lynton	Elizabeth Chesney	Marguerite St John	Madge Ryan	Brenda Forbes
Reverend Ernest Lynton	Eric Lewis	Harry Ashford	Michael Gough	George Rose
John Willcocks	Martin Lewis	Geoffrey Millar	John Price	Ned Schmidtke

Source:The Times, Internet Broadway Database and Theatricalia.

== Synopsis ==
The Hon Willie Tatham is at a dance at his own house, hosted by Lady Frinton. He is surprised by the return of his wife Margot from a long trip to Egypt. She catches the lonely Willie with Kitty Lake just at the moment when the former actress gives him a consoling kiss. There is a serious row, and Margot adopts the tone of a deeply injured wife. Fortunately for Willie, his widowed father, Lord Grenham, who has a roving eye and wide worldly experience, finds a young Australian, John Willcocks, who had a flirtation with Margot in Egypt more romantic and possibly more passionate than a casual kiss at a jazz supper party. Margot has fled Egypt to avoid further temptation. Grenham arranges for Willcocks, who has come to London in search of her, to have a chance of rekindling the Egyptian romance. Willocks proves a gentleman and abandons his pursuit. Mutual forgiveness is the result.

Meanwhile, Lady Frinton manoeuvres to lure Lord Grenham into a marriage. Margot, irritated by Grenham's efforts regarding Willcocks, assists in this by placing an announcement of Grenham's engagement to Frinton in The Times. This is all observed closely by the vicar, Lynton, and his wife, who is Grenham's sister. The Lyntons learn something, however, from Grenham's flexible attitude toward life. With the young couple reconciled and Lady Frinton triumphant, the vicar reproaches Grenham for calling him "a bloody old fool". Grenham responds by putting his arm round the vicar's shoulders and says, "But aren't we all, old friend?".

== Adaptations ==
- A film version was made in 1932, starring Gertrude Lawrence and Owen Nares.
- An Australian radio broadcast in 1940 starred Peter Finch.
- The play was adapted for television by the BBC in 1960, starring Diana Wynyard, Walter Fitzgerald, Jack Watling and Sally Home.

== Sources ==
- Donaldson, Frances (1957). Freddy Lonsdale. London: Heinemann. OCLC 2313952.
- Parker, John, ed. (1936). Who's Who in the Theatre (eighth ed.). London: Sir Isaac Pitman and Sons. OCLC 655107788.
