= George Merritt (actor) =

English actor (1890–1977)

- in Quiet Weekend (1946)
- Born: Frederick George Merritt; 10 December 1890; Greenwich, London, England
- Died: 27 August 1977 (aged 86); Camden, London, England
- Occupation: Actor
- Years active: 1930–1974

Frederick George Merritt (10 December 1890 – 27 August 1977) was an English theatre, film and television actor, often in authoritarian roles. He studied German theatre in Magdeburg, Germany, and was teaching at the Berlitz School at the outbreak of the First World War, when he was held as a British Civil Prisoner of War, and interned at Ruhleben, 1914–1918. He was involved in over 50 plays at Ruhleben. He lived for many years in Lissenden Gardens, Parliament Hill, north west London.

== Selected filmography ==
- The W Plan (1930) – Ulrich Muller
- Bracelets (1931) – Director
- Dreyfus (1931) – Émile Zola
- A Gentleman of Paris (1931) – M. Duval
- White Face (1932) – (uncredited)
- The Lodger (1932) – Commissioner
- The Blind Spot (1932) – Inspector Cadbury
- Money for Speed (1933)
- Going Straight (1933)
- F.P.1 (1933) – Lubin
- I Was a Spy (1933) – Captain Reichman
- Crime on the Hill (1933) – Police Inspector Wolf
- Turkey Time (1933) – Policeman (uncredited)
- The Silver Spoon (1933) – Inspector Innes
- The Ghost Camera (1933) – Detective
- Mr. Quincy of Monte Carlo (1933) – Inspector
- Little Fella (1933) – Detective
- The Fire Raisers (1933) – Sonners
- Nine Forty-Five (1934) – Inspector Dickson
- No Escape (1934) – Inspector Matheson
- My Song for You (1934) – Otto Newberg
- Jew Süss (1934) – Bilfinger (uncredited)
- Ten Minute Alibi (1935) – Inspector Pember
- Emil and the Detectives (1935) – PC
- Drake of England (1935) – Tom Moore
- Me and Marlborough (1935) – Harley
- Crime Unlimited (1935) – Detective Inspector Cardby
- Brown on Resolution (1935) – William Brown
- Line Engaged (1935) – Sgt. Thomas
- Mr. Cohen Takes a Walk (1935) – Pat O'Connor
- Ticket of Leave (1936) – Inspector Black
- Prison Breaker (1936) – Goldring
- Love at Sea (1936) – Inspector (uncredited)
- Love in Exile (1936) – Capt. Mackenzie (uncredited)
- Everything Is Thunder (1936) – Webber
- The Man Behind the Mask (1936) – Det. Insp. Mallory
- Spy of Napoleon (1936) – The Prussian Consul
- Dusty Ermine (1936) – Police Constable (uncredited)
- Educated Evans (1936) – Joe Markham
- Rembrandt (1936) – Church Warden (uncredited)
- Windbag the Sailor (1936) – Officer on Yacht (uncredited)
- The Vulture (1937) – Spicer
- The Compulsory Wife (1937) – Mr. Thackery
- The Wife of General Ling (1937) – Police Commissioner
- The Vicar of Bray (1937) – Oliver Cromwell (uncredited)
- Doctor Syn (1937) – Mipps the Coffin Maker
- The Return of the Scarlet Pimpernel (1937) – Chief of Police
- Rhythm Racketeer (1937) – Inspector Hunt (uncredited)
- The Rat (1937) – Pierre Verdier
- Young and Innocent (1937) – Det. Sgt. Miller
- Mr. Reeder in Room 13 (1937) – Bert Stevens, club porter
- Convict 99 (1938) – Policeman Outside Bank (uncredited)
- No Parking (1938) – (uncredited)
- The Gaunt Stranger (1938) – Police Station Sergeant
- They Drive by Night (1938) – Detective (uncredited)
- Q Planes (1939) – Barrett
- Dangerous Fingers (1939) – Charlie
- The Four Just Men (1939) – Inspector Falmouth
- Young Man's Fancy (1939) – Park Constable (uncredited)
- All at Sea (1940) – Bull
- Meet Maxwell Archer (1940) – Insp. Cornell
- They Came by Night (1940) – Inspector Metcalfe
- The Proud Valley (1940) – Mr. Lewis
- A Window in London (1940) – Manager
- The Case of the Frightened Lady (1940) – Det. Inspector Tanner
- Two for Danger (1940) – Inspector Canway
- Spare a Copper (1940) – Brewster
- Gasbags (1941) – German General (uncredited)
- The Ghost Train (1941) – Inspector (uncredited)
- He Found a Star (1941) – Max Nagel
- Ships with Wings (1941) – Surgeon Comdr.
- The Black Sheep of Whitehall (1942) – Station Master
- The Big Blockade (1942) – German: German Shelter Marshal
- Hatter's Castle (1942) – Gibson
- Back-Room Boy (1942) – Uncle
- Breach of Promise (1942) – Professor Beaver
- The Day Will Dawn (1942) – German Trawler Captain
- They Flew Alone (1942) – Reporter
- Let the People Sing (1942) – Police Sergeant
- Alibi (1942) – Bourdille
- We'll Smile Again (1942) – (uncredited)
- Women Aren't Angels (1943) – Boxer (uncredited)
- Variety Jubilee (1943) – Music Hall chairman (uncredited)
- Undercover (1943) – A Yugoslav General
- I'll Walk Beside You (1943) – Hancock
- The Adventures of Tartu (1943) – Agent (uncredited)
- Escape to Danger (1943) – Works Manager
- A Canterbury Tale (1944) – Ned Horton
- The Way Ahead (1944) – The Sergeant-Major (uncredited)
- Demobbed (1944) – James Bentley
- Give Us the Moon (1944)
- Love Story (1944) – Telephone Engineer
- Don't Take It to Heart (1944) – Landlord
- Waterloo Road (1945) – Air Raid Warden
- For You Alone (1945) – Police Constable Blundell
- I'll Be Your Sweetheart (1945) – T.P. O'Connor
- Don Chicago (1945)
- Home Sweet Home (1945) – Dr. Handy
- The Voice Within (1946) – McDonnell
- Quiet Weekend (1946) – Police Sergeant
- I'll Turn to You (1946) – Cecil Joy
- The Root of All Evil (1947) – Landlord
- The Man Within (1947) – Hilliard
- The Upturned Glass (1947) – Policeman (uncredited)
- Daughter of Darkness (1948) – Constable
- Escape (1948) – Chief Prison Guard (uncredited)
- Good-Time Girl (1948) – Police Sergeant
- Calling Paul Temple (1948) – Ticket Inspector
- My Brother's Keeper (1948) – Constable at Milton Wells
- Love in Waiting (1948) – James Hartley Pepperfield
- Quartet (1948) – Prison Officer
- For Them That Trespass (1949) – Engine Driver
- Marry Me! (1949) – Gazette Editor (uncredited)
- Dark Secret (1949) – Mr. Barrington
- Something in the City (1950) – Inspector
- Mr Drake's Duck (1951) – Home Secretary
- Pool of London (1951) – Captain of Dunbar (uncredited)
- Noose for a Lady (1953) – Sergeant Frost
- Small Town Story (1953) – Michael Collins
- The End of the Road (1954) – Timekeeper
- The Green Scarf (1954) – Advocate General
- Delayed Action (1954) – Sir Francis – (uncredited)
- Souls in Conflict – (1954) – Reverend Alan Woodbridge – (uncredited)
- Before I Wake – (1955) – Dr. Collingwood
- Quatermass 2 (1957) – Super
- Dracula (1958) – Policeman
- Tread Softly Stranger (1958) – Timekeeper
- The Full Treatment (1960) – Mr. Manfield
- The Hands of Orlac (1960) – 2nd Member (uncredited)
- The Day the Earth Caught Fire (1961) – Smudge (uncredited)
- Crooks and Coronets (1969) – 1st Old Man (uncredited)
- Battle of Britain (1969) – Civilian (uncredited)
- Cromwell (1970) – William
- I, Monster (1971) – Poole
- Gawain and the Green Knight (1973) – Old Knight

== Selected stage appearances ==
- Grand Hotel by Edward Knoblock (1931)
- Ten Minute Alibi by Anthony Armstrong (1933)
- Party Manners by Val Gielgud (1950)
