= Vera Allinson =

British screenwriter (1899–1971)

- Born: 15 April 1899; Finchley, Middlesex; United Kingdom
- Died: 1971 (aged 71–72); Buckinghamshire; United Kingdom
- Other name: Vera Hutton Allinson
- Occupation: Screenwriter
- Years active: 1933–1942 (film)
- Spouse: Michael Hankinson

Vera Allinson (1899–1971) was a British screenwriter. She wrote the screenplay for several films made by the American director Bernard Vorhaus at Twickenham Studios, including Street Song.

== Selected filmography ==
- Crime on the Hill (1933)
- Money for Speed (1933)
- Bella Donna (1934)
- Blind Justice (1934)
- The Broken Melody (1934)
- Street Song (1935)
- Ten Minute Alibi (1935)
- House Broken (1936)
- Ticket of Leave (1936)
- Danny Boy (1941)
- Sheepdog of the Hills (1941)
- Bob's Your Uncle (1942)

== Bibliography ==
- Low, Rachael. Filmmaking in 1930s Britain. George Allen & Unwin, 1985.
- Richards, Jeffrey (ed.). The Unknown 1930s: An Alternative History of the British Cinema, 1929– 1939. I.B. Tauris & Co, 1998.
