= Charles Hickman =

Charles Hickman may refer to:

- Charles Hickman (bishop) (1648–1713), Church of Ireland bishop of Derry
- Charles Hickman (director) (1905–1983), British theatre director and actor
- Charlie Hickman (1876–1934), American baseball player and college baseball coach
