= Crime on the Hill =

1933 British film by Bernard Vorhaus

- Trade advertisement
- Directed by: Bernard Vorhaus
- Written by: Bernard Vorhaus; E.M. Delafield; Vera Allinson; Michael Hankinson
- Based on: Crime on the Hill play by Jack De Leon and Jack Celestin
- Starring: Sally Blane; Nigel Playfair; Lewis Casson
- Cinematography: Claude Friese-Greene
- Edited by: Walter Stokvis
- Production company: British International Pictures
- Distributed by: Wardour Films
- Release date: 1 December 1933
- Running time: 69 minutes
- Country: United Kingdom
- Language: English

Crime on the Hill is a 1933 British mystery film directed by Bernard Vorhaus and starring Sally Blane, Nigel Playfair and Lewis Casson. It was written by Vorhaus, E.M. Delafield, Vera Allison and Michael Hankinson, based on the play of the same title by Jack de Leon and Jack Celestin. It was made by British International Pictures at Welwyn Studios in autumn 1933. The film's sets were designed by the art director Duncan Sutherland.

== Plot ==
A man tries to clear the name of his uncle who is wrongly convicted of a murdering the squire in a picturesque English village.

== Cast ==
- Sally Blane as Sylvia Kennett
- Nigel Playfair as Doctor Moody
- Lewis Casson as Reverend Michael Gray
- Anthony Bushell as Tony Fields
- Phyllis Dare as Claire Winslow
- Judy Kelly as Alice Green
- George Merritt as Inspector Wolf
- Hal Gordon as Sergeant Granger
- Gus McNaughton as Collins
- Jimmy Godden as landlord
- Hay Petrie as Jevons
- Kenneth Kove as tourist
- Reginald Purdell as reporter
- James Knight as newspaper editor
- Norma Varden as editor's secretary

== Reception ==
The Daily Film Renter wrote: "With the exception of an excellent performance by Reg Purdell in the minor part of a newspaper reporter, and a convincing portrayal by George Merritt as Inspector Wolf, the acting leaves something to be desired. ... The film has certainly been directed with care, and touches of originality are apparent in practically every scene."

Picture Show wrote: "A murder-mystery melodrama of a familiar type has been made thoroughly entertaining by fine direction."
