= The Green Pack =

- Directed by: T. Hayes Hunter
- Written by: John Hunter
- Based on: play The Green Pack by Edgar Wallace
- Produced by: Herbert Smith
- Starring: John Stuart; Aileen Marson; Hugh Miller
- Cinematography: Alex Bryce
- Edited by: Arthur Tavares
- Production company: British Lion Film Corporation
- Distributed by: British Lion Film Corporation (UK)
- Release date: 11 October 1934 (UK); (trade show)
- Running time: 72 minutes
- Country: United Kingdom
- Language: English

The Green Pack is a 1934 British drama film directed by T. Hayes Hunter and starring John Stuart, Aileen Marson and Hugh Miller. It was based on a play of the same name by Edgar Wallace. In the film, the wealthy investor in a South African gold mine is found murdered with several obvious suspects for the crime.

== Cast ==
- John Stuart - Larry Dean
- Aileen Marson - Joan Thurston
- Hugh Miller - Martin Creet
- Garry Marsh - Tubby Storman
- Michael Shepley - Mark Elliott
- J.H. Roberts - Doctor Thurston
- Anthony Holles - Inspector Aguilar
- Percy Walsh - Monty Carr
