= Honeymoon for Three (1935 film) =

- Directed by: Leo Mittler
- Written by: Stanley Lupino; Frank Miller
- Produced by: Stanley Lupino
- Starring: Stanley Lupino; Aileen Marson; Jack Melford
- Cinematography: George Stretton
- Edited by: Daniel Birt
- Music by: Percival Mackey
- Production company: Stanley Lupino Productions
- Distributed by: Associated British Film Distributors
- Release date: 13 September 1935
- Running time: 81 minutes
- Country: United Kingdom
- Language: English

Honeymoon for Three is a 1935 British musical comedy film directed by Leo Mittler and starring Stanley Lupino, Aileen Marson and Jack Melford. It was written by Lupino and Frank Miller.

== Plot ==
When returning home drunk from a night out a young man accidentally finds himself in a woman's flat where he passes out. Before he make his escape in the morning they are discovered by their parents and a passing policeman and forced to marry. They go through the ceremony but plan to go to California to get a divorce, and set off on their "honeymoon" along with her real fiancée. However during the journey she gradually begins to change her loathing of him.

== Cast ==
- Stanley Lupino as Jack Denver
- Aileen Marson as Yvonne Daumery
- Jack Melford as Raymond Dirk
- Robert English as Herbert Denver
- Dennis Hoey as M. Daumery
- Arty Ash as Herbert Jones
- Roddy Hughes as Toomes
- Syd Crossley as PC Smithers
- Doris Rogers as Mme. Daumery
- Barry Clifton as crooner
- Deidre Gale as the child
- Charles Penrose as laughing passenger
- Heron Carvic as minor role
- Percival Mackey as bandleader

== Production ==
It was made at Ealing Studios. The film's sets were designed by J. Elder Wills. It was the first film Lupino made after leaving British International Pictures and working as an independent producer.

== Reception ==
The Monthly Film Bulletin wrote: "Stanley Lupino is definitely good; he plays the part of Pagliaccio with real skill. His leading lady is charming and his rival in love gives him efficient support. To cater for all tastes there are some bedroom scenes, a small girl, a luxury steamship, some massed chorus effects (not very good pictorially) and plenty of excellent slapstick fooling. All these are woven in a workmanlike fashion into the story, which under skilful direction, keeps one expectant and amused. The art direction and the photography, except in the crowd effects, are good. A thoroughly good evening's entertainment for the lighthearted."

Kine Weekly wrote: "The humour in this comedy lies in the absurd manner in which the conventional triangle situations are approached. The idea of a disappointed suitor following a bride on her honeymoon with the unblushing intention of usurping her husband at the earliest possible moment, and at the same time, doing his best to prevent the husband during his brief reign from demanding that which is legally his, is so preposterous that a bare illustration of the situation is in itself laughable. Coupled with this are breezy knockabout situations, and a pleasing seasoning of melody. The picture emphatically is good, popular, light entertainment."

== Bibliography ==
- Wood, Linda. British Films, 1927-1939. British Film Institute, 1986.
