= Leader Magazine =

Leader Magazine was a weekly pictorial magazine published in the United Kingdom. The magazine was first owned by Pearson and then by Odhams. Later it became part of Hulton Press. The headquarters of the magazine was in London. The last issue of the weekly was published on 10 June 1950 and It was incorporated in Picture Post on 17 June 1950.

Contributors included Stephen Potter (editor), Kay Dick (literary critic), Anthony Carson, Orson Welles, Edgar Lustgarten, Lesley Blanch, Leslie Illingworth, Eric Partridge, cartoonist Vicky, Stephen King-Hall. Theatre critic John Barber was also sub-editor at one time. Another drama critic was Herbert Farjeon. Kaye Webb was theatre correspondent from 1947-49.

Other contributors included Denzil Batchelor, Gordon Beckles, Prof. D. W. Brogan, Barbara Cartland, Hayden Church, Susan Garth, Walter Hingston, Robert Lantz, Laurie Lee, Jean Paul Penez, John Maytime, Ruth Miller, Hugh Newman, Geoffrey Sharp, Charles Stuart, Stephen G. Watts, and Eric Williams.
