= Claude Duval (film) =

1924 British film by George A. Cooper

- Directed by: George A. Cooper
- Written by: Mary Bennett; Louis Stevens
- Starring: Nigel Barrie; Fay Compton; Hugh Miller; A.B. Imeson
- Cinematography: Henry Harris
- Production company: Gaumont British
- Distributed by: Gaumont British Distributors
- Release date: April 1924
- Country: United Kingdom
- Languages: Silent; English intertitles

Claude Duval is a 1924 British silent adventure film directed by George A. Cooper and starring Nigel Barrie, Fay Compton and Hugh Miller. It is based on the historical story of Claude Duval.

== Plot ==
In the seventeenth century a young Frenchman arrives in Britain and becomes mixed up in intrigue and ends up as a highwaymen.

== Cast ==
- Nigel Barrie as Claude Duval
- Fay Compton as Duchess Frances
- Hugh Miller as Lord Lionel Malyn
- A.B. Imeson as Lord Chesterton
- Dorinea Shirley - Moll Crisp
- James Knight as Captain Craddock
- James Lindsay as Duke of Brentleigh
- Betty Faire as Lady Anne
- Charles Ashton as Tom Crisp
- Tom Coventry as Mr Crisp
- Stella St. Audrie as Mrs Crisp
