= Neil F. Grant =

English journalist and playwright (1882–1970)

Neil Forbes Grant CBE (1 August 1882 – 24 December 1970) was an English journalist, memorialist, and playwright.

== History ==
Before being known as a dramatist, Grant had an extensive career as a journalist, serving as foreign editor of The Morning Post for seven years. His most successful play, Possessions, was first performed in January 1925, at the London Vaudeville, then had a long run at the Garrick Theatre.

== Works ==
- Dusty Ermine (Note: "Ermine" in the title is a synonym for the legal fraternity, and "Dusty" to a long association.) became the 1936 film Dusty Ermine, a.k.a. Love in the Alps, American title Hideout in the Alps.
- Possessions
- The Three Kisses (Note: Perhaps a reference to the tradition of friends "air kissing" each others' cheeks three times.)
- On Dartmoor
- The Age of Leisure
- Petticoat Influence

== Recognition ==
Grant was appointed a CBE in 1919.
