= Spring Handicap =

1937 film

- Original trade ad
- Directed by: Herbert Brenon
- Written by: William Freshman; Elizabeth Meehan
- Based on: play by Ernest E. Bryan
- Produced by: Walter C. Mycroft
- Starring: Will Fyffe; Maire O'Neill; Billy Milton; Aileen Marson
- Cinematography: Otto Kanturek
- Edited by: Lionel Tomlinson
- Production company: Associated British Picture Corporation
- Distributed by: Associated British Film Distributors
- Release date: May 1937
- Running time: 69 minutes
- Country: United Kingdom
- Language: English

Spring Handicap is a 1937 British comedy film directed by Herbert Brenon and starring Will Fyffe, Maire O'Neill and Billy Milton. It was written by William Freshman and Elizabeth Meehan based on the play The Last Coupon by Ernest E. Bryan. The film was made as a quota quickie by the Associated British Picture Corporation at their Elstree Studios.

== Premise ==
A wife tries to prevent her husband, a miner, from gambling away the money he receives as an inheritance.

== Cast ==
- Will Fyffe as Jack Clayton
- Maire O'Neill as Meg Clayton
- Billy Milton as Len Redpath
- Aileen Marson as Barbara Clayton
- Frank Pettingell as Scullion
- David Burns as Amos
- Hugh Miller as Selby
- Beatrice Varley as Mrs Tulip
- Wilfrid Hyde White as Hawkins (uncredited)

== Reception ==
Kine Weekly wrote: "The plot is extravagant, but it contains much homely sentiment winning by-play and quips that will be realised by all classes and both sexes. Will Fyffe is a tower of strength in the leading role, he is a comedian of limitless resource; Maire O'Neill strikes the human note firmly opposite him; and the rest contribute wholehearted support. The staging is decorative rather than convincing, but it adequately fits the simple play's many and effectively alternating moods. Good fun with a capacity to touch the emotions, the film should score readily on the average two-feature programme."

The Daily Film Renter wrote: "Will Fyffe turns in capital performance as shiftless, but lovable leading character, Maire O'Neill scoring as long-suffering wife. Pleasant romantic angles, convincing human touches, and comedy passages provide additional entertainment, while settings are well varied. Good robust popular fare."
