= Street Song (film) =

- Opening titles
- Directed by: Bernard Vorhaus
- Written by: Vera Allinson; Paul Gangelin; Bernard Vorhaus
- Produced by: Julius Hagen
- Starring: John Garrick; René Ray; Wally Patch
- Cinematography: Walter Blakeley; Ernest Palmer
- Edited by: Michael C. Chorlton
- Music by: W.L. Trytel
- Production company: Real Art Productions
- Distributed by: RKO Pictures
- Release date: 16 September 1935
- Running time: 64 minutes
- Country: United Kingdom
- Language: English

Street Song is a 1935 British musical film directed by Bernard Vorhaus and starring John Garrick, René Ray and Wally Patch. It was written by Vera Allinson, Paul Gangelin and Vorhaus.

== Plot ==
Pet shop owner Lucy befriends Tom, a busker who is mixed up with criminals. Lucy hopes to help him by getting him a singing job on the radio, while he tries to raise money to prevent her from being evicted, but any such hopes evaporate when Tom is arrested for robbery. Lucy's young brother, Billy, comes to their aid by inadvertently prompting the real robber to confess, and Tom is freed to pursue his singing career.

== Cast ==
- John Garrick as Tom Tucker
- René Ray as Lucy
- Wally Patch as Wally
- Laurence Hanray as Tuttle
- John Singer as Billy
- George Cross as Roy Hall
- Jack Vyvian as detective

== Reception ==
The Monthly Film Bulletin wrote: "An entertaining, humorous-sentimental story bringing in some amusing animals. Well photographed and acted."

Kine Weekly wrote: "Romantic drama of London life, the simple story of which successfully resorts to artifice to build up heart interest and point a moral. The acting, sincere rather than distinguished, is always equal to the modest demands of the dramatic situations, most of which are neatly handled, while music is cunningly employed to amplify the firm emotional structure of the theme. For the masses, to whom its appeal is obviously addressed, it is a sound supporting feature. ... Here is a pleasant, friendly piece of make-believe, which finds in artifice a sound medium for tender emotional expression. The plot never for a moment holds water, but its healthy sentiment, small-child interest, quiet undercurrent of suspense, moving poignancy and popular romance so intertwine as to fashion into an agreeable and entertaining design."

The Daily Film Renter wrote: "Film treads well worn paths, never achieving much conviction, while several incidents border on ludicrous. Principal points of appeal are tuneful song numbers. Quota support for not too critical patrons."
