= Hugh Miller (actor) =

British actor (1889–1976)

- 1936 Spotlight photo
- Born: Hugh Lorimer Miller; 22 May 1889; Berwick-upon-Tweed, Northumberland, England
- Died: 1 November 1976 (aged 87); London, England
- Occupation: Actor
- Years active: 1921–1962
- Spouse: Olga Katzin (m. 1921)
- Children: 3

Hugh Miller (22 May 1889 – 1 November 1976) was a British stage and film actor. He was instrumental in founding the original London Film Society in 1925, but left soon afterwards to work in America. He found success on Broadway, as Mr. Jingle in Pickwick in 1927; and in Hollywood, in the Gloria Swanson film The Love of Sunya, that same year. Miller was cast as dialogue coach for Lawrence of Arabia (1962), and was mentor to actor Peter O'Toole from early in his career who recommended Miller to Lean. Miller, who was one of several members of a David Lean film crew to be given bit parts, was hired again as dialogue coach in Doctor Zhivago (1965), his last screen effort before his death in 1976.

Miller married Olga Katzin, a satirical poet who published under the name Sagittarius, in 1921; they had three children.

== Filmography ==
- In His Grip (1921) as Alec Vicars (film debut)
- The Puppet Man (1921) as Alcide le Beau
- Darkness (1923) as Keever
- Bonnie Prince Charlie (1923) as Robert Fraser
- Claude Duval (1924) as Lord Lionel Malyn
- The City of Temptation (1925)
- Venetian Lovers (1925) as Count Astoni
- The Prude's Fall (1925) as Marquis de Rocqueville
- Blind Alleys (1927) as Julio Lachados
- The Love of Sunya (1927) as The Outcast
- The Green Pack (1934) as Martin Creet
- The Divine Spark (1935) as Paganini
- McGlusky the Sea Rover (1935) as Karim
- I Give My Heart (1935) as Choiseul
- The Dominant Sex (1937) as Philip Carson
- Spring Handicap (1937) as Selby
- The Vicar of Bray (1937) as King Charles I
- Bulldog Drummond at Bay (1937) as Ivan Kalinsky
- Victoria the Great (1937) as Older Disraeli
- Return of the Scarlet Pimpernel (1937) as De Calmet, Robespierre's Secretary
- The Rat (1937) as Luis Stets
- I'll Walk Beside You (1943) as Dr. Stevenson
- The Woman in the Hall (1947) as Mr. Walker
- Calling Paul Temple (1948) as Doctor
- My Sister and I (1948) as Hubert Bondage
- Before I Wake (1955) as Mr. Driscoll (U.S.title, ' Shadow of Fear')
- The Gelignite Gang (1956) as Mr. Crosby
- Behind the Mask (1958) as Examiner
- Lawrence of Arabia (1962) as R.A.M.C. Colonel (final film role)
