= Arthur Macrae =

Playwright and comic actor (1908–1962)

- in Dusty Ermine (1936)
- Born: 17 March 1908; London, England
- Died: 25 February 1962 (aged 53); Brighton, Sussex, England
- Education: RADA
- Occupations: Playwright; Actor

William Arthur Schroepfer (17 March 1908 – 25 February 1962), known by the pen name and stage name Arthur Macrae, was an English playwright and comic actor.

== Life and stage career ==
Arthur Macrae was born in London on 17 March 1908, the younger son of Paul Arthur Schroepfer – a jeweller – and his wife Margaret née Don. He was a pupil of Italia Conti, and made his first appearance on the stage at the St James's Theatre on 15 December 1921, as the third Wolf in Peter Pan; in the Christmas seasons of 1922–23 and 1923–24 he played William in Where the Rainbow Ends at the Holborn Empire. From 1925 to 1927 he studied at the Royal Academy of Dramatic Art, where his contemporaries included Richard Caldicot, Esme Church, George Howe, Agnes Lauchlan and André van Gyseghem.

Macrae began his adult career at the Court Theatre in October 1927, as Lieutenant Marin in Paul I, by Dmitry Merezhkovsky, and then as the tailor's boy in Mr Prohack by Arnold Bennett and Edward Knoblock. He appeared in repertory in 1928 and 29 in Bristol, Glasgow, and Edinburgh, and returned to London in December 1929 playing Charles Wykeham in Charley's Aunt at Daly's Theatre.

Macrae's stage roles in the 1930s included Sholto in a revival of Noël Coward's The Young Idea (the part played by the author in the original 1923 production) and Edward Marryot in Coward's Cavalcade. He made his Broadway début in 1937 playing Dudley in George and Margaret in a production directed by Coward at the Morosco Theatre.

From April 1941 to February 1946 Macrae served in the Royal Air Force. He reappeared on the stage at the Criterion Theatre in June 1948, as Tom Wright in his own play, Traveller's Joy, a farcical comedy that ran for 954 performances. At the Globe Theatre in 1953 he directed The Private Life of Helen in which he played Eteoneus. He again played in a Coward comedy in 1956, in the role of John Blair Kennedy in South Sea Bubble at the Lyric Theatre.

Macrae died in Brighton on 25 February 1962, aged 53.

== Writer ==
Macrae wrote or co-wrote many works for the theatre. He was the sole author of Flat to Let (1931), Indoor Fireworks (1934), Shall We Reverse? (1935), Tavern in the Town (1937), Sugar Plum (1939), Under the Counter (1945), Traveller's Joy (1948) and Both Ends Meet (1954). He was part-author of How D'You Do? (1933), Charlot's Chara-a-Bang (1935 ), The Town Talks (1936), Under Your Hat (1938), All Clear (1939), Full Swing (1942), Something in the Air (1943), Tuppence Coloured (1947), Slings and Arrows (1948), The Lyric Revue (1951), The Globe Revue (1952 ), Airs On a Shoestring (1953) and Living For Pleasure (1958). He translated and adapted three plays by the French writer André Roussin: Figure of Fun (1951), The Private Life of Helen (1953) and Nina (1955).

== Sources ==
- Gaye, Freda, ed. (1961). Who's Who in the Theatre (thirteenth ed.). London: Sir Isaac Pitman and Sons. OCLC 3039406.
- Hoare, Philip (1995). Noël Coward, A Biography. London: Sinclair-Stevenson. ISBN 978-1-4081-0675-4.
- Mander, Raymond; Mitchenson, Joe (2000) [1957]. Barry Day; Sheridan Morley (eds.). Theatrical Companion to Coward (second ed.). London: Oberon. ISBN 978-1-84002-054-0.
