= Ticket of Leave (film) =

- Dorothy Boyd and John Clements in the film
- Directed by: Michael Hankinson
- Written by: Margaret McDonnell; Vera Allinson; Michael Hankinson
- Produced by: Anthony Havelock-Allan
- Starring: Dorothy Boyd; John Clements; George Merritt; Wally Patch
- Cinematography: Francis Carver
- Production company: British and Dominions
- Distributed by: Paramount British Pictures
- Release date: January 1936
- Running time: 69 minutes
- Country: United Kingdom
- Language: English

Ticket of Leave is a 1936 British crime film directed by Michael Hankinson and starring Dorothy Boyd, John Clements and George Merritt. It was made as a quota quickie at British and Dominions Elstree Studios by the British subsidiary of Paramount Pictures. The title refers to the ticket of leave given to prisoners when they were released from jail.

== Plot ==
Young ticket-of-leave man Lucky Fisher meets ex-chorus girl Lillian Waters, who intends to steal a valuable necklace from her society fiancé Sir Richard Groves, and forces her to take him on as her partner in crime. They steal the necklace and then decide to repent and quietly return it, leaving no-one the wiser.

== Cast ==
- Dorothy Boyd as Lillian Walters
- John Clements as Lucky Fisher
- George Merritt as Inspector Black
- Max Kirby as Goodman
- Wally Patch as Sergeant Knott
- Enid Lindsey as Edith Groves
- J. Neil More as Sir Richard Groves
- Molly Hamley-Clifford as Old Rose

== Reception ==
The Monthly Film Bulletin wrote: "The sets are restricted, but the director handles his cameras and actors with reasonable pace of action. John Clements looks interesting on the screen, but George Merritt and Wally Patch, as police inspector and sergeant respectively, show that experience can do more than that even with less material."

Kine Weekly wrote: "This British essay in crime and romance is a poor, unimaginative job of work. The obvious plot is assembled in a very slipshod manner, and what little point there is is blunted by the wooddenness of the principal players. ... In this crime drama story values are the last consideration. There is plenty of comedy by-play, and much, opening and shutting of doors, but drama and suspense are conspicuously absent. The picture wears that hurried look; it appears to have been thrown together for one purpose only – quota."

The Daily Film Renter wrote: Unconvincing story of ticket-of-leave man's efforts to steal pearl necklace, aided by girl crook. Principal entertainment derives from clashings between two thieves, each anxious to outdo the other. Car chase climax infuses fair amount of excitement into concluding reel. John Clements gives smooth portrayal in lead, although miscast, while Wally Patch has neat study of sporting station sergeant."
