= Ten Minute Alibi =

1935 film directed by Bernard Vorhaus

- Film titles
- Directed by: Bernard Vorhaus
- Written by: Vera Allinson; Michael Hankinson
- Based on: Ten Minute Alibi by Anthony Armstrong
- Produced by: Paul Soskin
- Starring: Phillips Holmes; Aileen Marson; Theo Shall
- Cinematography: Alex Bryce; Harry Rose
- Edited by: Arthur Tavares
- Music by: John Foulds
- Production company: British Lion
- Distributed by: British Lion
- Release date: 22 January 1935
- Running time: 75 minutes
- Country: United Kingdom
- Language: English

Ten Minute Alibi is a 1935 British crime film directed by Bernard Vorhaus and starring Phillips Holmes, Aileen Marson and Theo Shall. It was written by Vera Allinson and Michael Hankinson, adapted from the 1933 play Ten Minute Alibi by Anthony Armstrong.

== Plot ==
When Colin Derwent's fiancée Betty is lured to Paris by the evil Philip Sevilla, Derwent dreams the plot of a perfect murder, which he then puts into practice.

== Cast ==
- Phillips Holmes as Colin Derwent
- Aileen Marson as Betty Findon
- Theo Shall as Philip Sevilla
- Morton Selten as Sir Miles Standish
- George Merritt as Inspector Pember
- Charles Hickman as Sgt. Brace
- Philip Hatfield as Hunter
- Dora Gregory as charwoman
- Grace Poggi as dancer
- Francis De Wolff

== Production ==
The film was made at Beaconsfield Studios. The film's sets were designed by the art director Andrew Mazzei.

== Reception ==
Kine Weekly wrote: "Bernard Vorhaus has accorded the play straightforward treatment and relied on the dialogue to gain his big dramatic moments ... Continuity is rather ragged in the opening, and it takes a little time for the picture to grip the interest, but once the idea of the crime is mooted the holding power is good and is not released tll the final shot."

Film Weekly wrote: "Fairly good murder drama, adapted from the successful play. Opens weakly, but works up to a really tense climax which is well worth seeing. ... The long-winded opening reminds one of British pictures two or three years ago. There is even a restaurant scene, complete with the inevitable nothing-to-do-with-the-story cabaret. ... Handicapped as he is by miscasting, Phillips Holmes succeeds in giving a pretty good performance ... Aileen Marson is just the girl in the case, and nothing more. Theo Shall overplays the villain by adopting a heavily melodramatic and theatrical style which went out of fashion some time ago."
