= Margaret Furse =

British costume designer (1911–1974)

Alice Margaret Furse (née Watts; 18 February 1911 – 8 July 1974) was a British costume designer. She has received various accolades, including an Academy Award, a BAFTA Award, and an Emmy Award.

== Personal life ==
She was born to Punch magazine illustrator Arthur G. Watts and his wife, Phyllis Gordon Watts. She married art director Roger K. Furse on 4 December 1936 at Chelsea Old Church.

== Career ==
She trained at the Central School of Arts and Crafts (now the Central School of Art and Design) and then joined Motley Theatre Design Group. She became a costume designer in films, her first film was Laurence Olivier's Henry V as assistant designer to Roger Kemble Furse. She had her own costumier business called New Sheridan House. In 1970, she was awarded an Academy Award for Best Costume Design for Anne of the Thousand Days (1969) and had five other nominations for The Mudlark (1951), Becket (1964), The Lion in Winter (1968), Scrooge (1970) and Mary, Queen of Scots (1971). She was also posthumously awarded an Emmy in 1975 for Outstanding Achievement in Costume Design for "Love Among the Ruins" (ABC Theatre, 6 March 1975) (her only nomination).

== Later years ==
Roger and Margaret Furse divorced in 1953. She remarried and remained with her second husband, the Scottish author, film and drama critic Stephen G. Watts (no relation to her parents), until her death from breast cancer on 8 July 1974, in Kensington, London.

A portrait is in the permanent collection of London's National Portrait Gallery. She was also painted by Gluck.

== Selected filmography ==
=== Film ===
Year	Title	Director	Notes
1948	Oliver Twist	David Lean	
1949	The Passionate Friends	David Lean	
1950	Madeleine	David Lean	
1950	Night and the City	Jules Dassin	Furse only designed costumes for Googie Withers
1950	The Mudlark	Jean Negulesco	with Edward Stevenson
1951	I'll Never Forget You	Roy Ward Baker	
1952	The Crimson Pirate	Robert Siodmak	
1953	The Master of Ballantrae	William Keighley	
1954	The Million Pound Note	Ronald Neame	
1956	The Spanish Gardener	Philip Leacock	
1957	The Secret Place	Clive Donner	
1957	Windom's Way	Ronald Neame	
1958	The Inn of the Sixth Happiness	Mark Robson	
1960	Kidnapped	Robert Stevenson	
1961	Greyfriars Bobby	Don Chaffey	
1962	In Search of the Castaways	Robert Stevenson	
1963	The Three Lives of Thomasina	Don Chaffey	
1964	Becket	Peter Glenville	
1964	A Shot in the Dark	Blake Edwards	
1965	Young Cassidy	Jack Cardiff	
1965	Return from the Ashes	J. Lee Thompson	
1966	Cast a Giant Shadow	Melville Shavelson	
1966	The Trap	Sidney Hayers	
1968	The Lion in Winter	Anthony Harvey	
1968	Great Catherine	Gordon Flemyng	
1969	Sinful Davey	John Huston	
1969	Anne of the Thousand Days	Charles Jarrott	
1970	Scrooge	Ronald Neame	
1971	Mary, Queen of Scots	Charles Jarrott	
1973	Bequest to the Nation	James Cellan Jones	

=== Television ===
Year	Title	Notes
1961–1965	The Magical World of Disney	11 episodes
1975	Love Among the Ruins	Television film Posthumous release

== Awards and nominations ==
Award	Year (Note: Indicates the year of ceremony. Each year is linked to the article about the awards held that year, wherever possible.)	Category	Work	Result	Ref.
Academy Awards	1952	Best Costume Design – Black and White	The Mudlark	Nominated	
Academy Awards	1965	Best Costume Design – Color	Becket	Nominated	
Academy Awards	1969	Best Costume Design	The Lion in Winter	Nominated	
Academy Awards	1970	Best Costume Design	Anne of the Thousand Days	Won	
Academy Awards	1971	Best Costume Design	Scrooge	Nominated	
Academy Awards	1972	Best Costume Design	Mary, Queen of Scots	Nominated	
British Academy Film Awards	1965	Best British Costume Design – Colour	Becket	Won	
British Academy Film Awards	1966	Best British Costume Design – Colour	A Shot in the Dark	Nominated	
British Academy Film Awards	1966	Best British Costume Design – Colour	Young Cassidy	Nominated	
British Academy Film Awards	1969	Best Costume Design	The Lion in Winter	Nominated	
British Academy Film Awards	1971	Best Costume Design	Anne of the Thousand Days	Nominated	
Primetime Emmy Awards	1975	Outstanding Achievement in Costume Design	Love Among the Ruins	Won (Note: Tied with Guy Verhille for The Legend of Lizzie Borden)	
