= Sagittarius (poet) =

Olga Katzin Miller (9 July 1896 – 6 January 1987) was a British satirical poet who published under the name Sagittarius. She was closely associated with the New Statesman for several decades in the mid-twentieth century.

Under her birth name, Olga Katzin published a collection of poems—in 1927 in Britain and 1928 in the United States—satirizing major English poets, titled Peeps at Parnassus and illustrated by Arthur Watts. In a review in Poetry Magazine, Alexander Laing declared that it illustrated "that satire and wit" of such a precise British versifier "are on a distinct and higher plane" from typical American comic and parodic verse.

Miller began publishing with the New Statesman in the late 1930s, and published several books of her poems, including Sagittarius Rhyming in 1940, Targets in 1943, and Quiver's Choice in 1945. The "Acknowledgments" in Quiver's Choice note that, in addition to the Sagittarius poems, it also contains verses published under the names "Fiddlestick" and "Roger Service." She was more widely read and discussed in the postwar period, when, as David Kynaston observes, she spoke for a certain British attitude bitterly resigned to Britain's subservience to American interests. Two of her poems on this theme were republished in the United States by Time in 1944 and 1948. Her poems often wittily made use of the forms and themes of Elizabethan poetry, including a parody of Christopher Marlowe's "The Passionate Shepherd to His Love" titled "The Passionate Profiteer to His Love." In this sense, she was part of a larger revival, in the early reign of Elizabeth II, of the then-queen's namesake Elizabeth I, exemplified by works such as Benjamin Britten's opera Gloriana.

Born into a Jewish family in London, Olga Katzin married Hugh Miller, a well-known stage actor, in 1921; they had three children.
