= Roger K. Furse =

English painter and costume designer (1903–1972)

- Born: 11 September 1903; Ightham, England
- Died: 19 August 1972 (aged 68); Corfu, Greece
- Occupations: painter, costume designer, production designer
- Years active: 1934 – 1963 (stage and film)
- Spouse(s): Margaret Furse (m. 1936; div. 1953) Ines Sylvia Perg (m. 19??; his death 1972)

Roger Kemble Furse (11 September 1903 – 19 August 1972) was an English painter who worked as a costume designer and production designer for both stage and film.

== Career ==
Roger Furse was the son of Lieutenant General Sir William Furse and Jean Adelaide Evans-Gordon. He was educated at St George's School, Windsor Castle, at Eton College and at the Slade School of Fine Art in London.

Furse began working as a stage designer in 1934, but he did not work on films until the early 1940s. At the outbreak of World War II, he joined the navy. In 1943, he was granted a temporary release to design the costumes and armour for Laurence Olivier's film version of Shakespeare's Henry V (1944). In 1945, at the end of the war, he was reunited with Olivier at the Old Vic company in London.

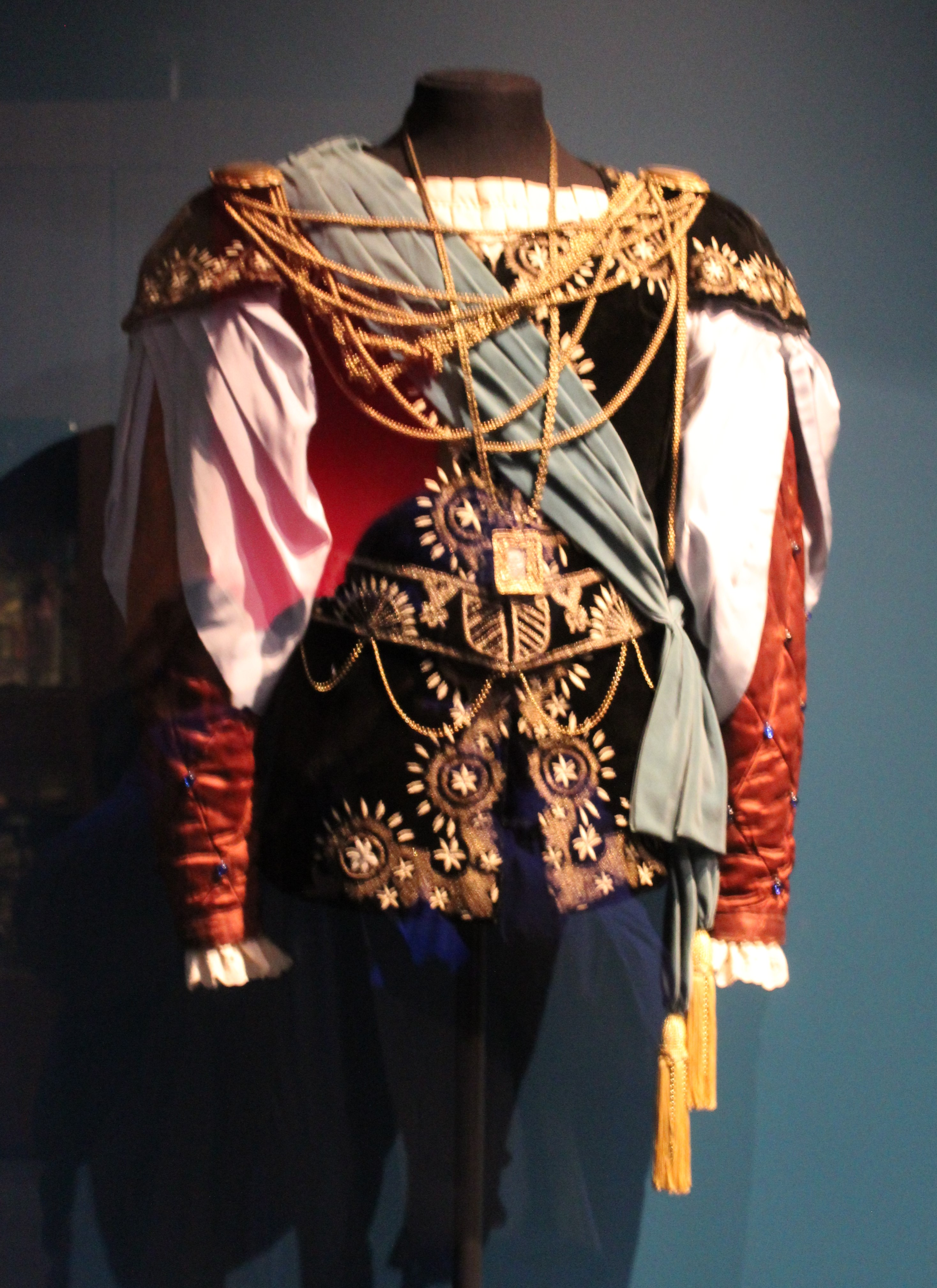
Hamlet, 1948, costume designed by Furse

In 1946, he created the sets for the ballet Adam Zero at the Royal Opera House, Covent Garden.

Furse became a frequent collaborator with Olivier on both stage and screen, often on Shakespearean productions. He won two Oscars in 1949, one each for his art direction and costume design of Olivier's film version of Hamlet (1948). He also worked with Olivier on his films Richard III (1955) and The Prince and the Showgirl (1957).

His other film credits include Odd Man Out (1947), Ivanhoe (1952), Knights of the Round Table (1953), Helen of Troy (1956), Saint Joan (1957) and The Roman Spring of Mrs Stone (1961).

In 1959 Furse went to Hollywood (in the company of Olivier) as production designer on Spartacus (1960), but he did not receive a screen credit for his work. Peter Ustinov, who was also working on the film, described Furse as 'a delightful bearded figure'.

He was nominated for a Tony Award in 1961 for his set design of the Broadway hit drama, Duel of Angels.

== Family ==
Roger Furse's first wife was Margaret Furse (nee Watts), who was also an Academy Award-winning costume designer. His portrait of her is included in the permanent collection of the National Portrait Gallery in London.

His second wife was Ines Sylvia Perg. Their marriage lasted until his death in 1972. She died in 1986.

He did not have any children from either of his marriages.

The actress Judith Furse was his younger sister.
