= House Broken (1936 film) =

- Opening titles
- Directed by: Michael Hankinson
- Written by: Vera Allinson; Paul Hervey Fox
- Produced by: Anthony Havelock-Allan
- Starring: Louis Borel; Jack Lambert; Mary Lawson; Enid Stamp-Taylor
- Cinematography: Francis Carver
- Production company: British and Dominions
- Distributed by: Paramount British Pictures
- Release date: June 1936
- Running time: 73 minutes
- Country: United Kingdom
- Language: English

House Broken (also known as Broken House) is a 1936 British comedy film directed by Michael Hankinson and starring Louis Borel, Jack Lambert and Mary Lawson. It was written by Vera Allinson and Paul Hervey Fox.

== Plot ==
A woman attempts to provoke her husband’s jealousy by openly flirting with a Frenchman.

== Cast ==
- Louis Borel as Charles Delmont
- Jack Lambert as Jock Macgregor
- Mary Lawson as Angela Macgregor
- Enid Stamp-Taylor as Peggy Allen

== Production ==
The film was made at Rock Studios, Elstree, as a quota quickie for release by Paramount Pictures.

== Reception ==
The Monthly Film Bulletin wrote: "The situations are amusing, the dialogue crisp, the acting of the four characters excellent, and the respective sides of husband and wife well put."

Picturegoer called the film a "feeble comedy which is weak in dialogue and situation."

Picture Show wrote: "This farcical domestic comedy is notable for one thing – the work of Louis Borell [sic], a newcomer who has a charming personality, a delightful accent, and a gay sense of comedy. ... Taken as a whole it is slightly dull and unsophisticated, but fairly amusing."
