= Blind Justice (1934 film) =

1934 British film by Bernard Vorhaus

- Scene from the film
- Directed by: Bernard Vorhaus
- Written by: Vera Allinson; Arnold Ridley (play)
- Produced by: Julius Hagen
- Starring: Eva Moore; Frank Vosper; Geraldine Fitzgerald
- Cinematography: Sydney Blythe
- Music by: W.L. Trytel
- Production company: Real Art Productions
- Distributed by: Universal Pictures
- Release date: 18 October 1934
- Running time: 73 minutes
- Country: United Kingdom
- Language: English

Blind Justice is a lost 1934 British thriller film directed by Bernard Vorhaus and starring Eva Moore, Frank Vosper, Geraldine Fitzgerald, Roger Livesey, and John Mills. It was written by Vera Allinson based on the 1932 play Recipe for Murder by Arnold Ridley, and was made at Twickenham Studios as a quota quickie for release by Universal Pictures.

A review of the play, mentioning the forthcoming film, was one of the first uses of the word "whodunit" in print.

== Preservation status ==
The British Film Institute has classed Blind Justice as a lost film. Its National Archive holds a collection of stills but no film or video materials.

== Plot ==
A woman is blackmailed by a criminal, who has discovered that her brother was shot as a coward during World War I.

== Cast ==
- Eva Moore as Fluffy
- Frank Vosper as Dick Cheriton
- John Stuart as John Summers
- Geraldine Fitzgerald as Peggy Summers
- John Mills as Ralph Summers
- Lucy Beaumont as Mrs. Summers
- Hay Petrie as Harry
- Roger Livesey as Gilbert Jackson
- Charles Carson as Dr. Naylor

== Reception ==
The Daily Film Renter wrote: "Played out on lines of dialogue, film is ingeniously constructed, and has genuinely surprising twist climax. ... Excellent performances by Eva Moore and Frank Vosper. Acceptable popular fare. While Arnold Ridley's plot may seem to stretch the long arm of coincidence unduly, it cannot be denied that he has fashioned a workmanlike piece of melodramatics with a climax that packs a genuine surprise."

Kine Weekly wrote: "The story of this film is good ... but the treatment is unimaginative. The producer makes no attempt to break from the conventions of the stage: the plot is not only told mainly in dialogue, but unnecessary flashbacks still further hold up essential action. It is the clever, disarming character drawing of Eva Moore alone that reveals the story's invention and allows the ending to carry surprise. Without her the film would have been dull, with her it provides average entertainment for the not too sophisticated."

Picturegoer wrote: "Here is an ingenious murder story spoiled, I should imagine, by being rushed and produced on an inadequate scale. It has, in some inexplicable manner, got an amateurish touch about it. However, in spite of these drawbacks, it is interesting in plot and contains a notable piece of characterisation from Eva Moore. ... Settings and camera work are good, but the continuity is not all that could be desired, and the picture, as a whole, lacks the polish that could have made it a really outstanding dramatic offering."
