= The Broken Melody (1934 film) =

1934 British film by Bernard Vorhaus

- Opening titles
- Directed by: Bernard Vorhaus
- Written by: Vera Allinson; Michael Hankinson; H. Fowler Mear
- Produced by: Julius Hagen
- Starring: John Garrick; Margot Grahame; Merle Oberon; Austin Trevor
- Cinematography: Sydney Blythe; William Luff
- Edited by: Jack Harris
- Music by: W.L. Trytel
- Production company: Julius Hagen Productions
- Distributed by: Associated Producers & Distributors
- Release date: 15 May 1934
- Running time: 84 minutes
- Country: United Kingdom
- Language: English

The Broken Melody (also known as Vagabond Violinist) is a 1934 British musical drama film directed by Bernard Vorhaus and starring John Garrick, Margot Grahame, Merle Oberon and Austin Trevor. It was written by Vera Allinson, Michael Hankinson and H. Fowler Mear, and was made at Twickenham Studios. The film's sets were designed by the studio's resident art director James A. Carter.

== Plot ==
A composer kills his wife's lover and, having escaped from the prison on Devil's Island, returns to France and writes an opera about the experience.

== Cast ==
- John Garrick as Paul Verlaine
- Margot Grahame as Simone St. Cloud
- Merle Oberon as Germaine Brissard
- Austin Trevor as Pierre Falaise
- Charles Carson as Colonel Dubonnet
- Harry Terry as Henri
- Andreas Malandrinos as M. Brissard
- Toni Edgar-Bruce as Vera
- Conway Dixon as Colonel's friend
- Stella Rho as Lisette, Simone's maid
- Kynaston Reeves as Colonel Fitzroy

== Reception ==
Kine Weekly wrote: "A very ordinary story of the romance of an exiled prince has been handled in a drawn-out manner, with poor directoral technique and no imagination. ... The story, adapted from a play, handles familiar situations in a hackneyed way, and direction reveals neither kinematic sense nor imagination. Incident follows incident without clear centralisation, and the characterisation hardly emerges at all. It is inevitable, therefore, that interest in the plot should peter out long before it reaches its climax."

The Daily Film Renter wrote: "Leisurely in pace, but enlivened by ultra-vivid scenes of convict ship and settlement, with definitely grim moments. Story is old-fashioned in conception, but may be recommended for popular audiences on sentiment, romantic appeal and title pull."
