= Arthur Watts (illustrator) =

British illustrator and artist

- Born: 28 April 1883; Rochester, Kent, England
- Died: 20 July 1935 (aged 52); Pian San Giacomo, Graubünden, Switzerland
- Spouse(s): Phyllis Sachs (first), Margerie Dawson Scott (second) -1935 (his death)
- Children: Alice Margaret; Marjorie Ann; Simon; Julyan

Arthur George Watts DSO (1883–1935) was an illustrator and artist who was killed in an airplane crash in the Swiss Alps.

== Early life and education ==
Watts was born in Rochester, Kent, in 1883, the son of Joseph Watts, Deputy Surgeon-General in the Indian Medical Service Indian Army, and his wife Alice. His father retired early, and the family lived in Dulwich and Norwood in south-east London, where the family usually employed a resident cook and housemaid, and a nurse while the children were young.

Educated at Dulwich College, Watts was a talented artist from an early age and inked funny drawings in the margins of his school books; at Crystal Palace Poster Academy, he was awarded a silver medal for merit in 1901. From the age of 17 he was educated at the Slade School of Fine Art, from where he went to the Free Arts Schools in Antwerp and then Paris, Moscow and Madrid. He was reportedly one of the London arts schools crowd who holidayed regularly in St Ives, Cornwall, during the Edwardian period.

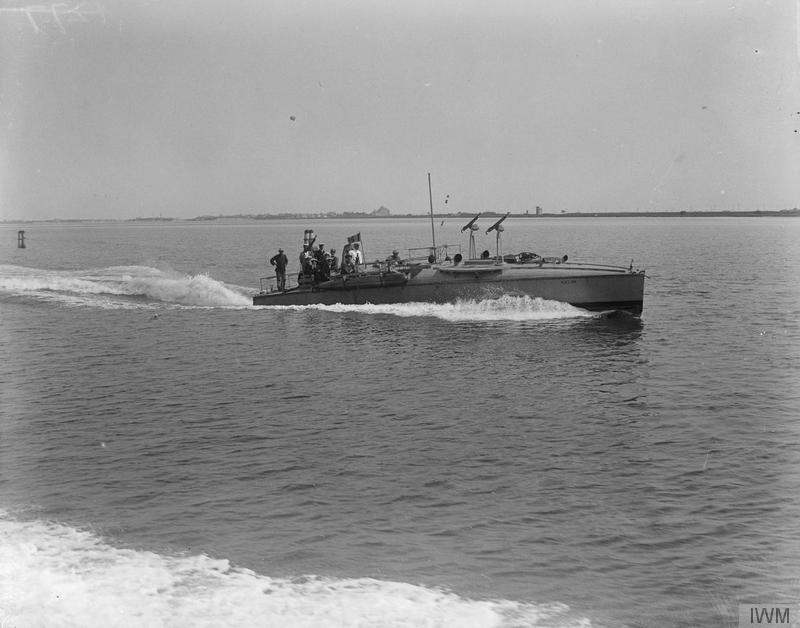
A naval motor launch of World War I

== Naval service ==
Watts served in World War I in the Royal Naval Volunteer Reserve, attaining the rank of commander and receiving the Distinguished Service Order for his bravery in the Zeebrugge Raid in 1918.

He received a temporary commission as sub-lieutenant in the Royal Naval Volunteer Reserve in December 1914, and on 18 December 1915, he was promoted to temporary lieutenant. In command of motor launch ML.239 in April 1918, he played a distinguished part in the "combined operation" known as the Zeebrugge Raid, also participating in the operations at Ostend in May 1918 when HMS Vindictive was sunk to block the harbor entrance. Watts was awarded the Distinguished Service Order as an acting lieutenant-commander on 27 August 1918.

== Career ==
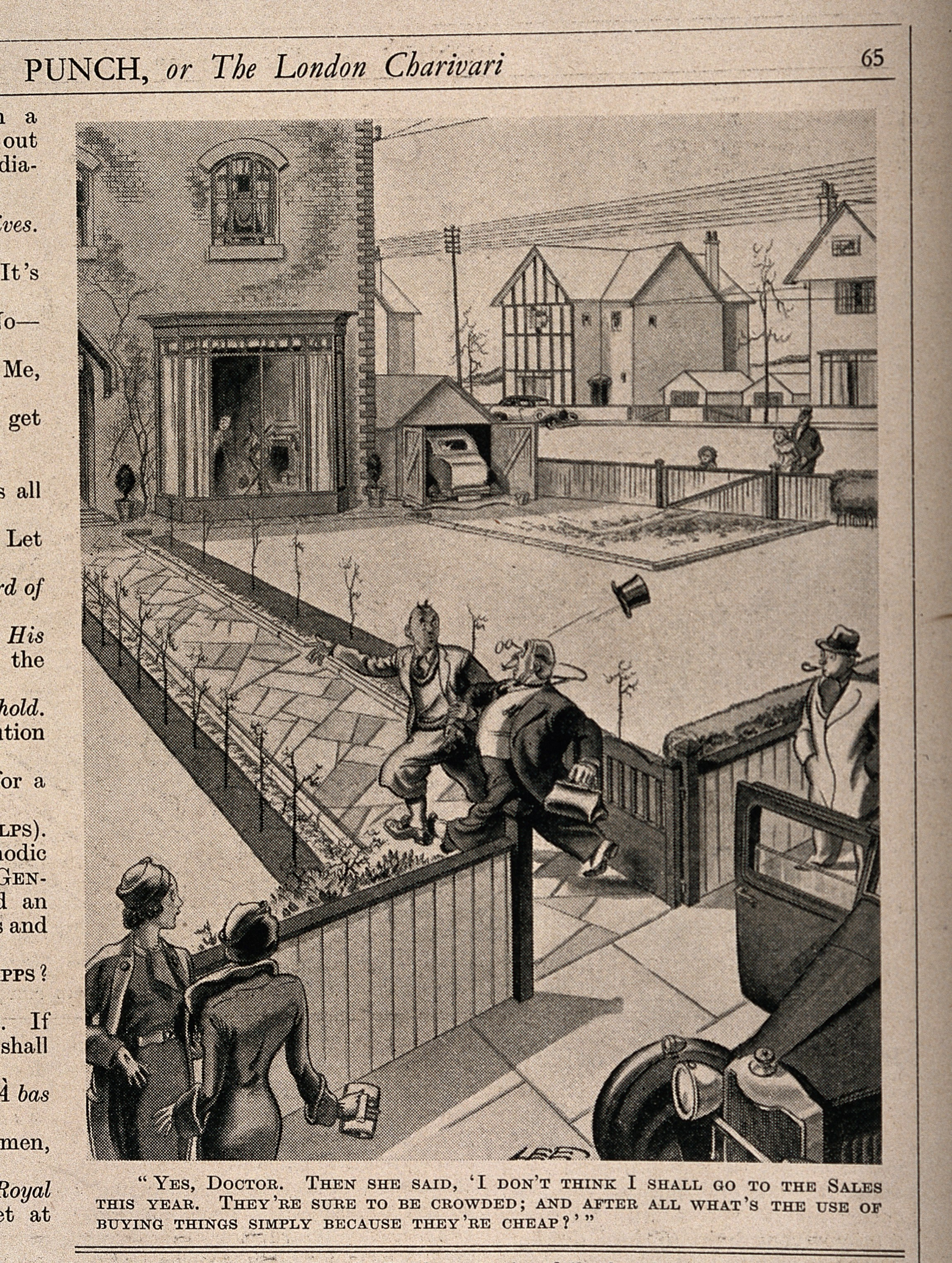
Punch magazine humour, 1930s

By 1904, he was providing humorous and other illustrations for papers such as the Tatler, The Bystander, Pearson's Magazine and London Opinion. In 1911, Watts was living with his wife of one year and their baby daughter Margaret at 21A Regents Park Road in central London, where he worked from a studio at home as a successful illustrator.

His first drawing for Punch, the English humour magazine, was published in 1912, and his work, particularly cartoons, continued to appear regularly until the time of his death, having become a regular feature after 1921. He also did four drawings a week for Radio Times; illustrated about a dozen books, including Diary of a Provincial Lady by E M Delafield; and designed travel posters for the railways and the London Underground. He edited and illustrated A Painter's Anthology.

Many of Watts' cartoons highlighted the class distinctions that existed in the UK in the nineteen-twenties and thirties. They offered a social commentary and an acute observation of differences in accent, vocabulary, dress, drinking habits, and even table manners. Some of his sharpest barbs were aimed at the "modern" art of the period, the nouveau riche, day trippers, social climbers and hen-pecked husbands. His contorted figures in paint, plaster and stone are clever caricatures of what he saw around him.

== Family ==
Watts married Phyllis Sachs, a fellow artist, in 1910. Their only child, Alice Margaret, became costume designer Margaret Furse. Phyllis died in 1922, and in 1925 he married Marjorie Dawson Scott (daughter of PEN Club founder Catherine Amy Dawson Scott), by whom he had three children. The family lived in Holly-place, Hampstead. Their daughter, Marjorie-Ann or Marjorie Ann Watts, also became an illustrator, and a writer.

== Death in an air crash ==
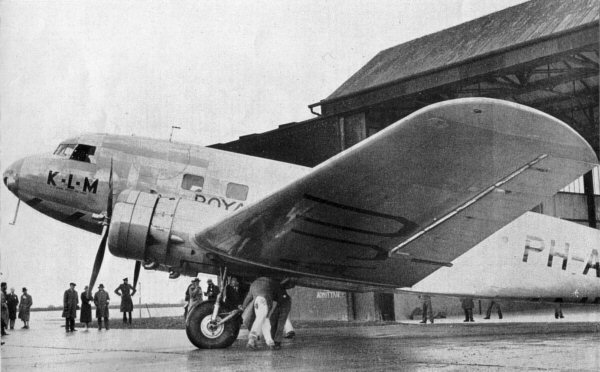
Douglas DC-2 in KLM service

Watts was killed at about 12:15 hours on Saturday, 20 July 1935 when travelling aboard KLM (Royal Dutch Airlines) Douglas DC-2 (registration "PH-AKG") named "Gaai" on a scheduled flight from Milan, Italy to Amsterdam, Netherlands, via Frankfurt, Germany. The aircraft, which had recently been delivered from the manufacturers, took off from Milan at 11:36 hours. While flying at 5000 m altitude, it suffered with ice build up and had to descend to 3000 m, at which altitude it was flying between mountains surrounded by clouds. Reportedly the crew may have entered the wrong mountain pass as they circled a valley in cloud and rain, possibly attempting to force land wheels-up when the aircraft stalled and crashed near the San Bernardino Pass near Pian San Giacomo, killing all four crew and all nine passengers.

Watts was hurrying home from Milan to be with his wife, who had given birth to their third child four days earlier.

The Times of London on 22 July 1935 carried an article "Dutch Air Disaster: Liner's crash in Alps", which states that the accident occurred a short distance south of the San Bernardino Pass on the Pian San Giacomo, a small plateau between high mountains at an altitude of 3,845 feet, about 2.5 miles from the village of Mesocco. The story reported that the aircraft was at too low an altitude to fly over the mountains towards San Bernardino but found the southern end of the pass blocked by a mass of dark clouds. At that time it was believed to have either been struck by lightning or dragged down by an air current as it suddenly hit the ground from a height of 600 feet. Rescuers found everybody dead, except for a woman who died soon afterwards. When police attended they recovered a large amount of money and mail-bags. An investigation found that the storm in the area had been so violent that swollen rivers had swept away two bridges, the local power plant had been put out of action and that the weather had played a significant part in the accident. The dead were removed to a small chapel at San Giacomo to await instructions for their disposition.

== Selected works ==
Articles and essays

- Black and White Drawing – Solving Some of Its Problems.
- "A Three-Legged Cruise" (Yachting Monthly, August to November 1913) – 4 parts
- "The Scented Trawler" (Yachting Monthly, 1917) – recounts a brief adventure at sea while on duty with the Auxlilary Patrol during World War I

Books illustrated

- A Painter's Anthology – Arthur Watts
- Diary of a Provincial Lady – E M Delafield
- The Provincial Lady in London – E M Delafield
- The Provincial Lady Goes Further – E M Delafield
- Poems of Impudence – Evoe (E V Knox)
- So, This is Science – H F Ellis
- The Navy and Defense – Lord Chatfield (includes a single sketch which Watts provided for an event aboard HMS Repulse at which time he also produced this illustration for Punch)
- Peeps at Parnasus: A Delicious Survey, Half Parody, Half Caricature, of the Whole Pageant of English Verse-Malicious and Gay. – Olga Katzin
- The Tragedy of Mr. Punch: A Fantastic Play in Prologue and One Act – Russell Thorndike and Reinald Arkell
- The Horoscope. A Biographical Poem in Three Books With an Epilogue. – Horace Horsnell
