= Michael Hankinson =

British screenwriter, film editor and director (1906–1986)

- Born: Michael Kyrle le Fleming Hankinson; 17 November 1906; Ewell, Surrey, England
- Died: 30 December 1986 (aged 80); Uckfield, East Sussex, England
- Occupations: Film director, editor, screenwriter
- Years active: 1929–1964 (film)
- Spouse: Vera Allinson

Michael Kyrle le Fleming Hankinson (17 November 1906 – 30 December 1986) was a British screenwriter, film editor and director. He wrote and directed the 1936 crime film Ticket of Leave for Paramount British. During the Second World War, he directed several documentary films.

== Selected filmography ==
=== Editor ===
- Good Night, Vienna (1932)
- Crime on the Hill (1933)
- Hyde Park Corner (1935)
- Take a Chance (1937)

=== Director ===
- Ticket of Leave (1936)
- House Broken (1936)
- The Scarab Murder Case (1936)

=== Screenwriter ===
- The Broken Melody (1934)
- Ten Minute Alibi (1935)
- Girls, Please! (1934)
- Dusty Ermine (1936)

== Bibliography ==
- Low, Rachael. Filmmaking in 1930s Britain. George Allen & Unwin, 1985.
