= Dusty Ermine =

1936 British film by Bernard Vorhaus

- Directed by: Bernard Vorhaus
- Written by: Neil F. Grant (play); Arthur Macrae; Paul Hervey Fox; Lawrence du Garde Peach; Harry Fowler Mear; Michael Hankinson
- Produced by: Julius Hagen
- Starring: Anthony Bushell; Jane Baxter; Ronald Squire; Margaret Rutherford
- Cinematography: Curt Courant; Otto Martini; Kurt Neubert
- Edited by: Ralph Kemplen
- Music by: W.L. Trytel
- Production company: Julius Hagen Productions
- Distributed by: Twickenham Film Distributors; Grand National Pictures (US)
- Release date: 10 September 1936
- Running time: 84 minutes
- Country: United Kingdom
- Language: English

Dusty Ermine (U.S. title: Hideout in the Alps) is a 1936 British crime film directed by Bernard Vorhaus and starring Anthony Bushell, Jane Baxter and Ronald Squire. It was written by Neil F. Grant, Arthur Macrae|, Lawrence du Garde Peach, Harry Fowler Mear and Michael Hankinson based on Grant's play of the same title.

== Plot ==
After being released from prison Jim Kent, a leading forger, is approached by an international counterfeiting organisation. He rejects their offer of employment as he intends to go straight, but when he discovers that his nephew is now working for the outfit he travels to Switzerland to try to help him out. An ambitious young detective from Scotland Yard is also on the trail of the forgery ring, and mistakenly comes to the conclusion that Jim Kent is still working as a master counterfeiter.

== Cast ==
- Anthony Bushell as Detective Inspector Forsythe
- Jane Baxter as Linda Kent
- Ronald Squire as Jim Kent
- Arthur Macrae as Gilbert Kent
- Margaret Rutherford as Evelyn Summers
- Austin Trevor as Swiss hotelier and gang leader
- Davina Craig as Goldie, the maid
- Athole Stewart as Mr. Kent
- Katie Johnson as Emily Kent
- Felix Aylmer as Police Commissioner
- Hal Gordon as Detective Sergeant Helmsley
- George Merritt as Police Constable
- Wally Patch as thug

== Production ==
The film was produced by Julius Hagen, the owner of a film production company based around Twickenham Studios. The film was shot at one of his other studios, J.H. Studios at Elstree, and also included extensive location filming in the Alps. It was directed by Vorhaus who had worked on earlier films for the company. Vorhaus was so impressed by the performance of Margaret Rutherford in a theatre production he saw her in, that he insisted on casting her in the film, adding a new comic relief role to the original play especially for her. The film's art direction was by Andrew Mazzei.

Hagen had an ambitious programme of films for 1936, but his failure to secure effective distribution led to financial problems and the collapse of his company the following year during the Slump of 1937. Vorhaus directed one further British film, Cotton Queen (1937), before returning to America.

== Reception ==
The Monthly Film Bulletin wrote: "The triangular battle of wits between Jim Kent, the forgers, and the police, coupled with the conflict of emotions in Linda and the detective, provide a captivating compound of drama and comedy, the many threads of which are neatly woven together. The plot is good, the dialogue is very good, the acting is excellent; the photography is equally satisfactory on the set and in the Alpine scenes. The director has imposed a good rhythm both of mood and of tempo. Altogether, this film is good material well handled."

Kine Weekly wrote: "Several incidents are neatly planned, and the theme claims a certain novelty of setting and circumstances. But it lacks the dramatic drive calculated to enchain the attention."

The Daily Film Renter wrote: "Painstaking direction holds interest, moving story along against varied locales. Good popular entertainment. ... The early scenes are, perhaps, a trifle protracted, but once the action shifts to the Alps, the pace quickens. The climax, with crooks hotly pursuing a Scotland Yard man on skis, is genuinely exciting."

== Bibliography ==
- Richards, Jeffrey (ed.). The Unknown Thirties: An Alternative History of the British Cinema, 1929-1939. I.B. Tauris & Co, 2000.
