= Stephen G. Watts =

Scottish author, film and drama critic

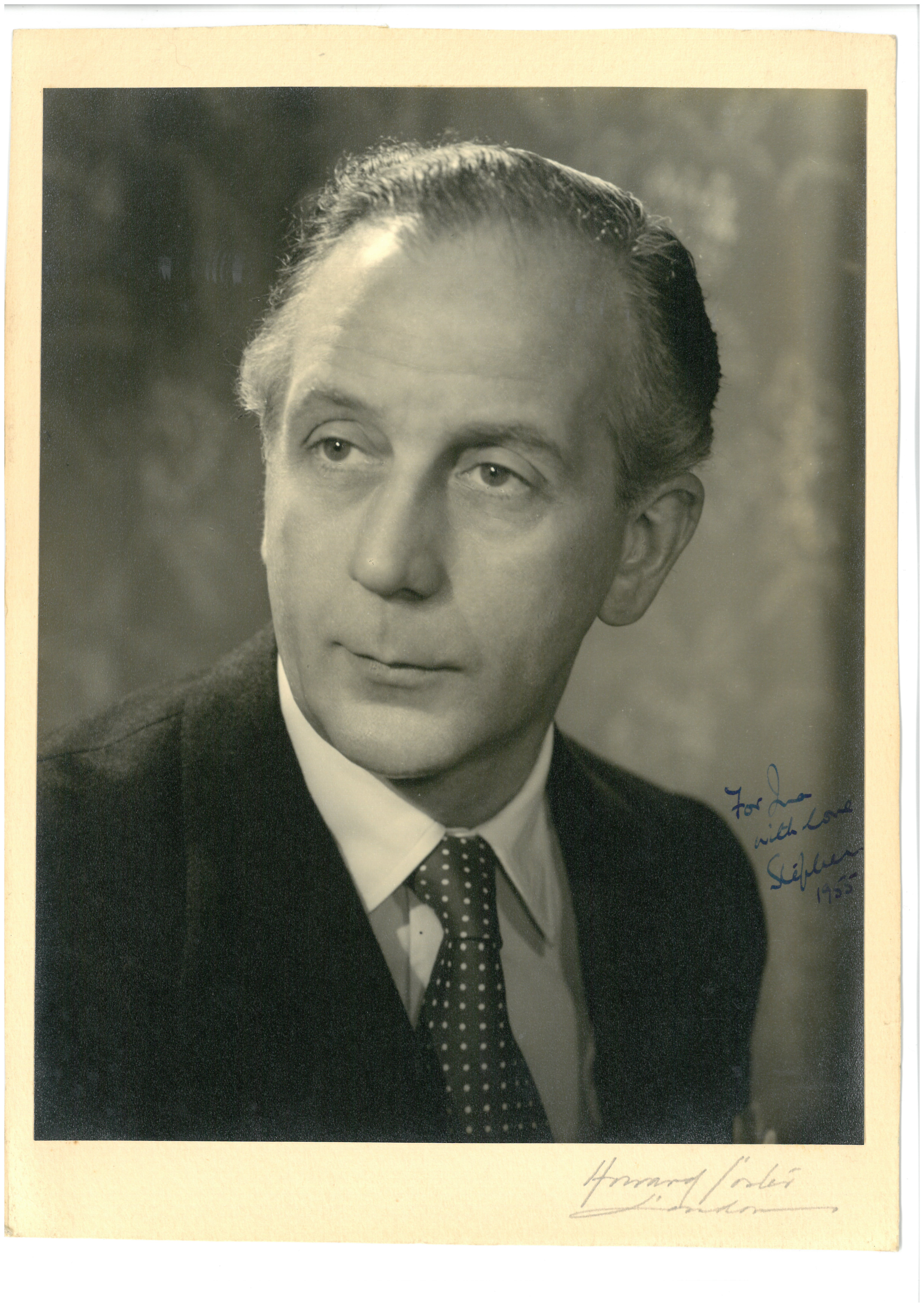
- Born: 19 September 1910; Glasgow, Scotland
- Died: 1996 (aged 85–86); Guilford, England
- Occupations: author, film and drama critic
- Spouse(s): Margaret Furse (?–1974), Lady Helen Richards (1979–1996)

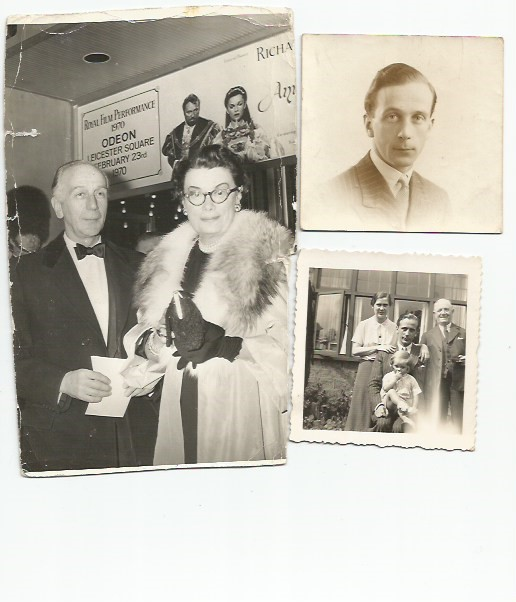
Stephen Watts with his first wife Margaret Furse at the Royal Film Premier of Anne of the Thousand Days (1969), for which Furse won the Academy Award for Best Costume Design, on 23 February 1970. The smaller pictures are of Watts as a younger man and with his sister Williamina ("Ina") Bottomley (nee Watts) (back left) in about 1940.

Stephen Glass Watts (19 September 1910 – 1996) was a Scottish author, film and drama critic.

== Early years ==
Stephen Watts was born in Glasgow in 1910 and attended North Kelvinside Higher Grade School and was initially apprenticed to an accountant before turning to journalism first as film critic of The Bulletin (1928–32) and then editor of the Scottish Stage magazine (1931–1934).

Stephen Watts moved to London at the age of 21 and worked firstly as a critic and feature writer for Film Weekly (1932–1934) and then film and drama critic of the Sunday Express (1934–1939).

== Second World War Service ==
As recounted in his war memoir Moonlight on a Lake in Bond Street, Stephen Watts volunteered for the army the day after war broke out, and eventually rose to the rank of Major in the King's Royal Rifle Corps, and was "lent" (but not formally transferred) to the Intelligence Corps. He was in the Café de Paris when it was bombed in March 1941, and was involved in a deception involving a double for General (later Field Marshal) Bernard Montgomery ("Monty") in the run-up to D-Day in 1944. He was awarded the Bronze Star Medal by the United States of America for his work as the MI5 Representative on the Inter-Services Security Board, United Kingdom (1943–44), in particular because, "Through his cooperation and unstinted advice, Major Watt (sic) rendered invaluable assistance and aided materially in the performance of the American military mission".

== Subsequent career ==
After the war, Stephen Watts returned to the Sunday Express (1945–1949) before becoming film correspondent of the New York Times (1949–1969). He also wrote for a wide variety of publications including the Sunday Times, The New Yorker, The Sketch (for which he was a columnist), the Daily Express, the Sunday Graphic, Picturegoer magazine, Leader Magazine, and Lilliput magazine.

He chaired the Film Section of The Critics' Circle (1947–48) and was president of The Critics' Circle (1953–54). He was made a life member of the National Union of Journalists (NUJ) in 1980.

In addition, he wrote several books (see "Books") and edited over 200 booklets in the Background Books series for Bodley Head. He was also a television drama script editor for Rediffusion (1960–1962).

== Personal life ==
Stephen Watts was married twice: first to Academy-Award and Emmy winning costume designer Margaret Furse, who won the Academy Award for Best Costume Design for Anne of the Thousand Days (1969), until her death in 1974, and second, in 1979, to Lady Helen Richards (widow of the judge Sir Norman Richards QC) until his death in Guilford in 1996. He had no children.

Although he lived in London for the rest of his life after moving there in 1932, he remained attached to his home city of Glasgow and, in particular, maintained a lifelong friendship with the Scottish writer and broadcaster Jack House.

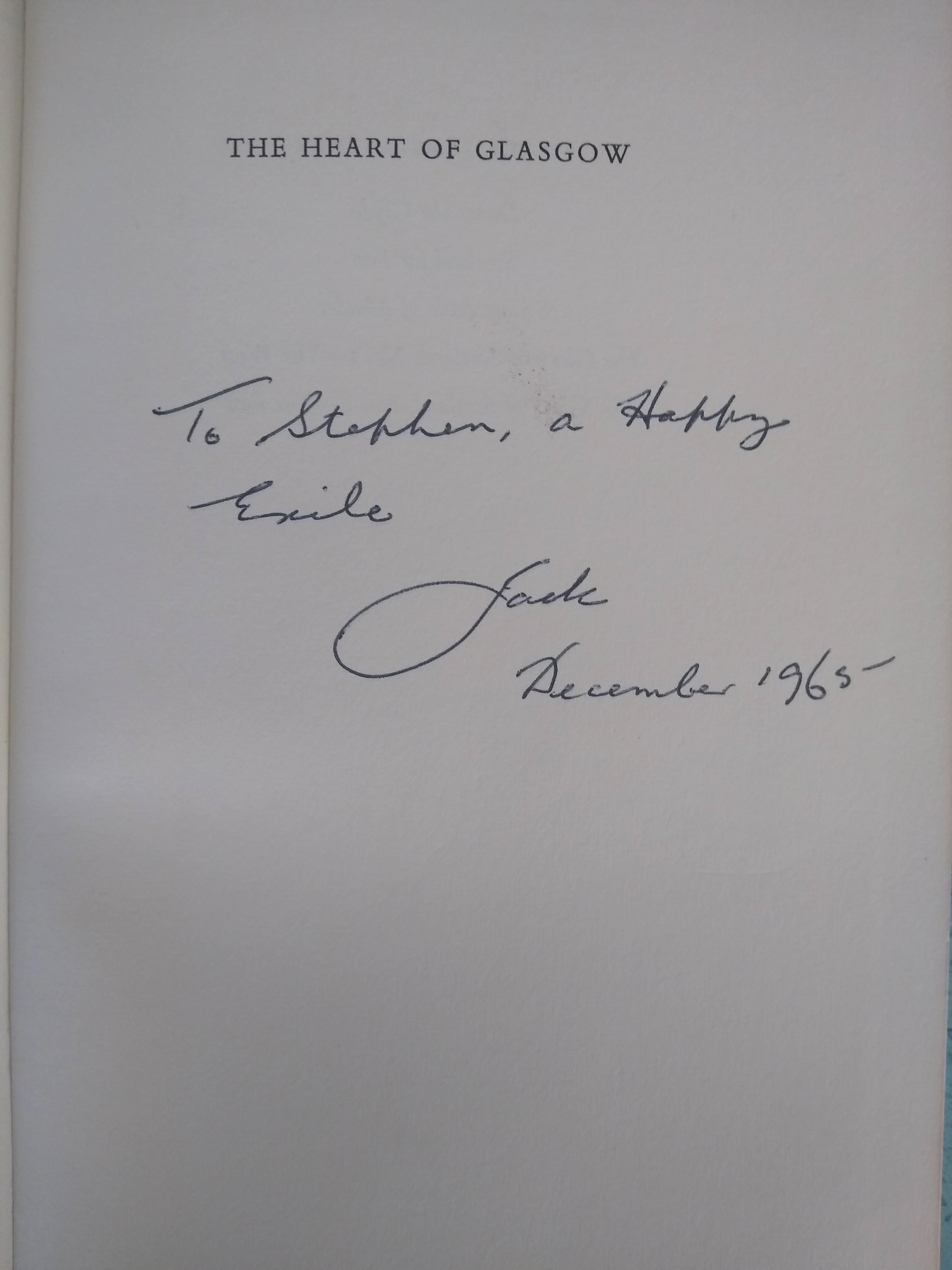
The inscription "To Stephen, a Happy Exile, Jack, December 1965" written by Jack House to Stephen Watts on the title page of a first edition of his book "The Heart of Glasgow" published in 1965, referring to Watts' "exile" from Glasgow in London.

== Books ==
Behind the Screen (Arthur Barker, 1938) (Editor), subtitled How Films are Made.

The Pale Horse (Macmillan, 1943), a collection of short stories (not to be confused with the later novel by Agatha Christie with the same name).

The Sound of the Trumpet (Selwyn H Blount, 1946), a novel.

Moonlight on a Lake in Bond Street (Bodley Head, 1961 and W. W. Norton & Co. Inc., 1962), a war memoir.

Sober and Properly Dressed (Bodley Head, 1963), a novel.

The Ritz (Bodley Head, 1964), a factual history.
