= Danny Boy (1941 film) =

1941 British film by Oswald Mitchell

- Directed by: Oswald Mitchell
- Screenplay by: Vera Allinson
- Produced by: Hugh Perceval (uncredited)
- Starring: Wilfrid Lawson; Ann Todd; John Warwick
- Cinematography: Stephen Dade
- Edited by: A.C. Knott
- Music by: Percival Mackey
- Production companies: Butcher's Film Service; Signet Picture Corporation (uncredited)
- Distributed by: Butcher's Film Service (UK)
- Release date: 25 August 1941 (UK)
- Running time: 80 min.
- Country: United Kingdom
- Language: English

Danny Boy is a 1941 British drama film directed by Oswald Mitchell and starring David Farrar, Wilfrid Lawson, Ann Todd, John Warwick, and Grant Tyler. It was written by Vera Allinson.

== Cast ==
- David Farrar as Martin
- Wilfrid Lawson as Newton
- Ann Todd as Jane Kaye
- John Warwick as Carter
- Grant Tyler as Danny
- Wylie Watson as Fiddlesticks
- Tony Quinn as Maloney
- Nora Gordon as Mrs Maloney
- Pat Lennox as manager
- Albert Whelan as Scotty
- Harry Herbert as Skinny

== Reception ==
The Monthly Film Bulletin wrote: "This simple story is developed sincerely and humanly by the players – Ann Todd as Jane Kay is charming, John Warwick plays the sensitive musician with feeling and Grant Tyler is excellently cast in the title role. His spontaneous chuckles at Wylie Watson and Albert Whelan, who supply the humorous interludes, and his trusting simplicity during each turn of event, will appeal to all, though the sentiment may be overstressed for some. The scenes of London in the blitz are well photographed and almost too realistic."

Kine Weekly wrote: "The story is no profound contribution to screen literature, neither does it aspire to documentary, but transparent as it is, it nevertheless amply serves its purpose as a peg for popular comedy, sentiment aud tunes. ... The principal players are, with few exceptions, more than equal to their responsibilities – Grant Tyler is, for instance, a real juvenile discovery – and the direction is not lacking in resource."

Halliwell's Film and Video Guide describes the film as a "sentimental drama with music; not for the critical."
