= The Way of Youth =

- Directed by: Norman Walker
- Written by: Amy Kennedy Gould (play); Sherard Powell; Ralph Neale (play)
- Produced by: Norman Walker
- Starring: Irene Vanbrugh; Aileen Marson; Sebastian Shaw
- Cinematography: Eric Cross
- Edited by: Cecil H. Williamson
- Production company: British and Dominions
- Distributed by: Paramount British Pictures
- Release date: 27 November 1934
- Running time: 66 minutes
- Country: United Kingdom
- Language: English

The Way of Youth is a 1934 British crime film directed by Norman Walker and starring Irene Vanbrugh, Aileen Marson and Sebastian Shaw. It was made at British and Dominions Elstree Studios as a quota quickie.

== Premise ==
A young woman and her army officer fiancé fall into heavy debt at a gambling club run by her own estranged grandmother.

== Cast ==
- Irene Vanbrugh as Madame Bonnard
- Aileen Marson as Carol Bonnard
- Sebastian Shaw as Lieut. Alan Marmon
- Henry Victor as M. Sylvestre
- Diana Wilson as Grace Bonnard
- Robert Rendel as Sir Peter Marmon
- Leslie Bradley as Lieut. Burton

== Reception ==
The Daily Film Renter wrote: "This not very convincing plot is put over in undistinguished fashion. Half-way through, the story structure crumbles ... Settings are quite good, however, and the Western Brothers are given an opportunity of putting over their celebrated "Old School Tie" number in a night club sequence. Irene Vanbrugh sketches the grandmother with polished skill, completely dominating the action throughout. Aileen Marson, as Carol, and Sebastian Shaw, as Alan, are quite good, Henry Victor giving a sinister interpretation of Sylvestre. Robert Rendell, as Alan's father, and Diana Wilson, as Carol's mother, play sythpathetically; their love interest making a pleasing side issue."

Picturegoer wrote: "An obvious and threadbare theme makes it impossible for such an accomplished actress as Irene Vanbrugh to create much interest in the production as a whole, although she herself is well in character. ...The rest of the acting is unremarkable, and the story is still further hampered by unnecessary detail, which adds still more to its artificiality."

Picture Show wrote: "Even Irene Vanbrugh's clever study of a shrewd old night club proprietor cannot compensate for the weakness of this film in every other direction. The aged plot, bald dialogue, poor direction and weak acting make a film from which it is best to stay away."

== Bibliography ==
- Chibnall, Steve. Quota Quickies: The Birth of the British 'B' Film. British Film Institute, 2007.
