= Money for Speed =

1933 film directed by Bernard Vorhaus

- Directed by: Bernard Vorhaus
- Written by: Bernard Vorhaus; Vera Allinson; Monica Ewer; Lionel Hale
- Produced by: Bernard Vorhaus
- Starring: John Loder; Ida Lupino; Cyril McLaglen; Moore Marriott
- Cinematography: Eric Cross
- Edited by: David Lean
- Music by: Philip Braham
- Production company: Hall Mark Productions
- Distributed by: United Artists
- Release date: March 1933
- Running time: 73 minutes
- Country: United Kingdom
- Language: English

Money for Speed (U.S. title: Daredevils of Earth) is a 1933 British sports drama film directed by Bernard Vorhaus and starring John Loder, Ida Lupino, Cyril McLaglen and Moore Marriott. It was written by Vorhaus, Vera Allinson, Monica Ewer and Lionel Hale.

It features speedway riders Ginger Lees, Lionel van Praag and Frank Varey, and speedway promoter Johnnie Hoskins. The film's editor David Lean appears briefly as a newspaper reporter.

== Preservation status ==
In 1992 the British Film Institute classed Money for Speed as a lost film. Subsequently two prints resurfaced, one dubbed into French and the other with German subtitles.

== Plot ==
Big Bill Summers is an Australian speedway rider who is introduced to Jane by his rival, motorcycle ace Mitch Mitchell. Though Jane appears to be a simple country girl, she is actually a hard-boiled gold-digger conspiring with Mitchell to fleece Summers for everything he is worth. Upon discovering her betrayal, Summers goes berserk. He rides into a major race with vengeance on his mind, intentionally crashing into Mitchell and leaving his rival seriously injured. Banned from the track, Summers drifts down the professional ladder until he finds work riding in a funfair's "Wall of Death." The fair's proprietor convinces him to attempt a spectacular stunt: a death-defying leap from the wall into a safety net. Realising that pulling off the feat is his only shot at personal redemption, he agrees.. Despite sustaining injuries during the landing, Summers knows he has conquered his demons, and a thoroughly repentant Jane is waiting for him.

== Cast ==
- John Loder as Mitch
- Ida Lupino as Jane
- Cyril McLaglen as Big Bill Summers
- Moore Marriott as Shorty
- Marie Ault as Ma
- David Lean as reporter

== Production ==
The film was made by the independent company Hall Mark Productions at Wembley Studios and was distributed by United Artists.

== Reception ==
The Daily Film Renter wrote: "Unconvincing narrative redeemed by excellently photographed and highly thrilling motor cycle racing shots with machines crashing in flames. Wall of Death leap injects punch into climax. Noted speedway riders provide realistic atmosphere. Attractive performance by Ida Lupino as double-crossing heroine. Should appeal to popular patrons. It was a good idea to utilise the speedways as a talkie background, and although the film is not an over-ambitious production, it 'certainly carries a number of thrilling sequences."

Picturegoer wrote: "Here we have that rara avis, a successful British action drama, and its producers are to be congratulated on bringing to the screen the thrills of a popular British sport – speedway racing – and linking them with a straightforward but convincing story. Authentic speedway sequences taken at Wembley are thrilling, excellently photographed, and give the film a slick momentum rare in our productions."

Variety wrote: "Piffling stuff. ... As a hero Cyril McLaglen is not very effective. John Loder is an obvious heavy. The story is sluggish, sometimes silly and often incoherent. ... Plenty of library newsreel shots of crowds and racing scenes, not very clear but fair enough."
