= Theo Shall =

German actor (1896–1955)

- Born: 24 February 1894; Metz, Alsace–Lorraine, German Empire
- Died: 4 October 1955 (aged 59); East Berlin, East Germany
- Other name: William Guldner
- Occupation: Actor
- Years active: 1920–1955 (film)

Theo Shall (1894 – 1955) was a German stage and film actor. He was born in Metz when it was part of the German Empire but left following its occupation by France following the First World War.

== Selected filmography ==
- Das Spielzeug von Paris (1925)
- Anna Christie (1930) as Matt Burke
- The Adventurer of Tunis (1931) as René
- Five from the Jazz Band (1932) as Martin
- Rasputin, Demon with Women (1932) as Lieutenant Suschkoff
- Shadows of Paris (1932)
- Spring in the Air (1934) as Paul
- Fruit in the Neighbour's Garden (1935) as Theo
- Ten Minute Alibi (1935) as Phillip Sevilla
- Tango Notturno (1937) as Officer Phillip
- The Grey Lady (1937) as Harry Morrel
- The Tiger of Eschnapur (1938) as the manager of the Crystal Palace
- Pour le Mérite (1937) as Capitain Cecil Wood
- Cadets (1939) as Capitain Jupow
- Escape in the Dark (1939) as René Laroche
- The Rothschilds (1940) as Selfridge
- Happiness Is the Main Thing (1941)
- Carl Peters (1941) as Robert Mitchell
- Secret File W.B.1 (1942) as Mr. Wood
- The Red Terror (1942) as a saboteur
- Titanic (1943) as 1st Officer Murdoch
- Kolberg (1945) as Louis Henri Loison
- Zugverkehr unregelmäßig (1951)
- Story of a Young Couple (1952) as the prosecutor
- Geheimakten Solvay (1953) as Director Menneke
- Stärker als die Nacht (1954) as Dr.Panneck
- Der Fall Dr. Wagner (1954) as Rolling
- Swings or Roundabouts (1954) as Muhlberger
- Hotelboy Ed Martin (1955)

== Bibliography ==
- Goble, Alan (1999). The Complete Index to Literary Sources in Film. Walter de Gruyter. ISBN 978-3-11-095194-3.
