= Aileen Marson =

British actress (1912–1939)

- Picturegoer postcard
- Born: 13 September 1912; Alexandria, Egypt
- Died: 4 May 1939 (aged 26); London, England
- Occupations: Film actress Stage actress
- Years active: 1933-1938.

Aileen Marson (13 September 1912 – 4 May 1939) was a British stage and film actress. Born in Egypt where her father was a consular official with the diplomatic service, she travelled extensively due to her father's job (including a stay in Bucharest) and spoke five languages including Arabic. She came to England with her family when she was 13. Winning a scholarship to the Royal Academy of Dramatic Art, she appeared in regional and West End plays, (including mounting her own productions), and also starred in a number of leading roles in British films. She toured South Africa with Seymour Hicks where she met her husband, Jack Scott, a Johannesburg businessman, whom she married in 1937. She died at the age of 26 in a London nursing home less than a day after giving birth to twins - a boy and a girl.

== Filmography ==
- The Green Pack (1934)
- Road House (1934)
- Lucky Loser (1934)
- Passing Shadows (1934)
- My Song for You (1934)
- The Way of Youth (1934)
- Ten Minute Alibi (1935)
- Honeymoon for Three (1935)
- Royal Cavalcade (1935)
- The Black Mask (1935)
- Living Dangerously (1936)
- Someone at the Door (1936)
- The Limping Man (1936)
- The Tenth Man (1936)
- The Green Cockatoo (1937)
- Spring Handicap (1937)

== Bibliography ==
- Shafer, Stephen C. British Popular 1929-1939: The Cinema of Reassurance. Routledge, 1997.
- Sutton, David R. A Chorus of Raspberries: British Film Comedy 1929-1939. University of Exeter Press, 2000.
