= Bernard Vorhaus =

American film director, screenwriter and film producer (1904–2000)

- Born: December 25, 1904; New York, New York, U.S.
- Died: November 23, 2000 (aged 95); London, UK
- Education: Harvard University
- Occupations: Film director, screenwriter, producer
- Years active: 1925–1953

Bernard Vorhaus (December 25, 1904 – November 23, 2000) was an American film director and screenwriter of Austrian heritage, best known for his work in both Hollywood and the United Kingdom. Born in New York City, he was the son of an immigrant father from Kraków.

Vorhaus began his career as a screenwriter and later co-produced the German musical film The Singing City. He established himself in Britain during the 1930s, becoming recognized for producing and directing quota quickies alongside contemporaries such as Michael Powell.

During the post-war era, Vorhaus was blacklisted in Hollywood for alleged communist sympathies. As a result, he returned to England and continued his work in European cinema.

== Career ==
Vorhaus was the son of a lawyer and studied at Harvard University. His sister Amy's work on film scenarios for silent pictures influenced him to become involved in filmmaking. He directed a total of 32 movies and reportedly was an influence on future film director David Lean, some of whose early work as a film editor was on Vorhaus pictures.

He worked steadily as a screenwriter in Hollywood while in his twenties for such studios as Columbia Pictures and Fox Studios but wanted to direct movies. He eventually decided to move to England and began directing quota quickies, such as The Last Journey (1935).

After attaining success in England, Vorhaus moved back to the U.S. and began working at Republic Pictures, directing B-movies. He also worked in the US Army Air Force with their motion picture unit during World War II. He was blacklisted in 1951 because of the hearings conducted by the House Un-American Activities Committee.

Vorhaus had already moved to Europe at that time and directed a few minor films while there. He finally returned to England and retired from the film business. Unlike contemporaries Joseph Losey and Cy Endfield, who were also on the blacklist, he founded a company, Domar Industries, a business specializing in house renovations. When Lean mentioned him as an early influence in 1985, it led to a selection of Vorhaus films to be restored by the National Film and Television Archive to go along with retrospectives.

== Personal life ==
Vorhaus had two children, Gwyn and David. The latter is a bass player and electronic music pioneer who works under the name White Noise.

== Selected filmography ==
Ronald Reagan looking for Bogeys in Recognition of the Japanese Zero Fighter (1943)

- Steppin' Out (US, 1925) author of screenplay
- Seventh Heaven (US, 1927) co-author of screenplay
- No Other Woman (US, 1928) co-author of screenplay
- Sunshine (US, 1928) two-reeler; debut as director
- The Singing City (Germany, 1930) producer; starring Brigitte Helm
- City of Song (UK, 1931) producer
- Money for Speed (UK, 1933)
- Crime on the Hill (UK, 1933)
- The Ghost Camera (UK, 1933)
- On Thin Ice (UK, 1933)
- The Night Club Queen (UK, 1933)
- The Broken Melody (UK, 1934)
- Blind Justice (UK, 1934)
- Dark World (UK, 1935)
- Street Song (UK, 1935)
- Ten Minute Alibi (UK, 1935)
- The Last Journey (UK, 1935)
- Dusty Ermine (UK, 1936)
- Broken Blossoms (UK, 1936) technical supervisor
- Cotton Queen (UK, 1937)
- King of the Newsboys (US, 1938)
- Fisherman's Wharf (US, 1939)
- Way Down South (US, 1939) co-director
- Three Faces West (US, 1940)
- Lady From Louisiana (US, 1941)
- Angels With Broken Wings (US, 1941)
- The Affairs of Jimmy Valentine (US, 1942)
- Recognition of the Japanese Zero Fighter (US, 1943) short film
- Bury Me Dead (US, 1947)
- The Amazing Mr. X (US, 1948) also known as The Spiritualist
- So Young, So Bad (US, 1950)
- The Lady From Boston (France-US, 1951) also known as Pardon My French
- Imbarco a mezzanotte (Italy, 1951) also known as Stranger on the Prowl; replaced by Joseph Losey
- Fanciulle di lusso (Italy, 1953) also known as Finishing School, written by blacklisted writer Norma Barzman
- Roman Holiday (US, 1953) assistant director, under pseudonym
