= Charles Hickman (director) =

British theatre director and actor (1905–1983)

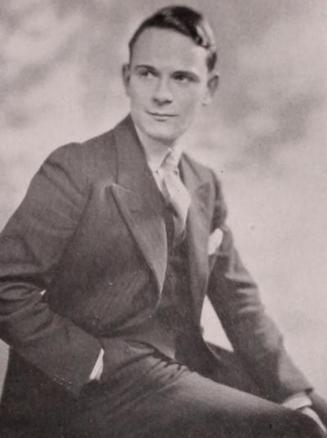
- Born: 18 January 1905; Wanstead, Essex, England
- Died: 3 April 1983 (aged 78); Knightsbridge, London, England
- Education: Chigwell School, Essex
- Occupations: Theatre director and actor
- Partner: John Kerr
- Parents: Charles Richard Hickman (father); Rita Raison (mother)
- Relatives: Rita, Audrey and Daphne (younger sisters), Ronald (younger brother)

Charles Hickman (18 January 1905 – 3 April 1983) was a British theatre director and actor who worked mainly in London's West End theatres. According to his obituary in The Times, as a performer, "He had an easy manner and a quick period sense in parts between Shakespeare and light comedy, revue and pantomime."

After an early career in acting Hickman made his directorial debut in London in 1940 with The Peaceful Inn at the Duke of York's Theatre. The last West End play he directed was A Murder Announced in 1979. Between those two dates he directed a total of 61 London productions. He also directed several plays in Australia and South Africa, as well as one production, Black Chiffon (1950) in New York. Hickman directed many of the biggest stars of the London stage such as Evelyn Laye, Anton Walbrook, George Formby, Margaret Lockwood, Sybil Thorndike, Robertson Hare, Beryl Reid, Ralph Lynne and many others. Some of his most successful plays include Annie Get your Gun, Wedding in Paris, Black Chiffon and The Merry Widow.

== Life and career ==
Hickman left Chigwell School at the age of sixteen and spent two years studying drama at the Royal Academy of Dramatic Art (RADA) in London. He says of his teachers at RADA, " If Norman Page taught me to think for myself and Helen Hayes how to behave in a Drawing-room, then Claude Rains showed me how to enjoy being an actor. 'Lovely-lovely! Go on! Wonderful!' "

In 1923 Hickman made his first appearance on stage with a small part during the first act of Aren't We All? by Frederick Lonsdale at the Globe Theatre, now the Gielgud Theatre, in London's West End. He was paid £3 a week. In 1929 Hickman was given the opportunity to perform in New York City. The play Bird in Hand, in which Hickman played the part of Gerald, was ending its run at the Royalty Theatre and was going to be produced in New York by Lee Shubert. Hickman wrote, " I was to get the unbelievable salary of $100 a week! ... New York loved the play and loved English actors even more. We were a sell-out." Hickman spent most of the following year (1930) touring with the play in Chicago and finally in Cleveland.

In 1931 Hickman's film career began when he was contracted to play the part of George, co-starring with Jean Colin and C. M. Hallard in the film Compromising Daphne. His contract stated he would be paid £30 a week for a guaranteed period of ten weeks. For one week Charles Hickman's name was in lights on the front of the Empire cinema in Leicester Square. He pursued an acting career for almost two decades before achieving his ambition to become a director, firstly in 1939 with the Wilson Barrett company at the Empire Theatre, Edinburgh and then in 1940 with The Peaceful Inn in London's West End.

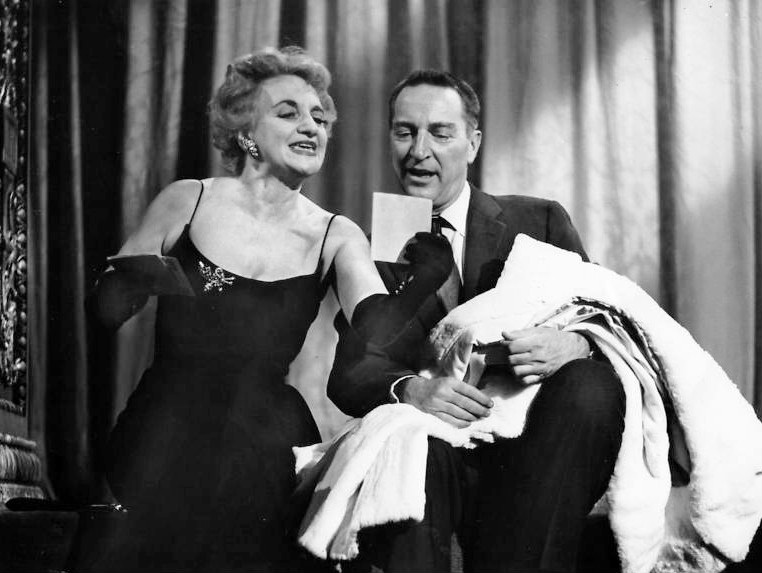
Hermione Gingold whom Hickman directed in all three Sweet and Low shows 1943-1946

During the early war years of 1940 to 1943 Hickman worked as director for the Wilson Barrett Repertory Company. Wilson Barrett and his partner Neil Crawford decided to move the company from Hammersmith, London, to Edinburgh after a brief stay in Wales. Hickman wrote, " The Floral Hall in Llandudno gave us a home on our way to Edinburgh - where sirens wailed and windows were blacked and we went on doing a different play every week." During the run of the revue Sweet and Low (1943) Emile Littler, the producer of the show, offered Hickman a contract to direct any production of his but with the freedom to work for other managements in between. The contract was for £2,000 a year. Hickman's agent Aubrey Blackburn thought it was a good offer and Hickman accepted. After Sweet and Low Hickman directed two more revues which were revised versions of the first, Sweeter and Lower (1944) and Sweetest and Lowest (1946). The leading lady of these three revues was Hermione Gingold and she had been performing in them for three consecutive years. The war was over and the management agreed to give Gingold three weeks holiday. She and Hickman bought sleeper tickets from London to Naples and from there they took the boat to Capri.

Also, in 1946 Hickman left his flat in 14 Buckingham Street, Covent Garden, in the heart of London's theatre land and bought a small house in Knightsbridge, 81 Kinnerton Street, which was to be his main residence until his death in 1983. Hermione Gingold lived a couple of doors down from him at 85 Kinnerton Street.

By the late 1940s Hickman's career as a theatre director was well established. A play that ran for 337 performances was Cage Me a Peacock (1948). It was a musical comedy adaptation of Noel Langley's rollicking novel set in ancient Greece. Hickman wrote, " The show was ahead of its time and although the general public may not have been ready to accept its high-camp, it managed to fill both the Strand and Cambridge theatres for nearly a year and was a signpost to musicals of the future."

== Theatre career as actor ==
- 1923 played Arthur Wells in Aren't We All?, Globe Theatre, London
- 1925 toured as Algy Fairfax in Diplomacy
- 1926 toured in Lavender Ladies, Hay Fever, The Love Game
- 1927 played Toby Sinclair in The Price
- 1927 played Dennis Cobtree in Dr. Syn, Strand Theatre, London
- 1928 played Harold in The Eldest Son, Everyman, London
- 1928 played Benjamin in Easter, Arts Theatre, London
- 1928 played Truman in The Clandestine Marriage
- 1929 played Gerald in Bird in Hand , Royalty, London then at The Booth Theatre, New York
- 1930 toured the United States in the same part
- 1930 played Anthony Howard in The Silent Witness, The Comedy, London
- 1931 played Norman chase in Bed Rock, The Apollo, London
- 1931 played Geoffrey Barrowdale in Marry at Leisure, Haymarket, London
- 1932 played Johnny March in Windows, Duchess
- 1933 played Reggie Cawston in The Methods of Margot, "Q" Theatre Company, London
- 1933 played Widow Twankey in Aladin, Embassy, London
- 1934 played Giotto in For Ever, Shaftesbury
- 1934 played Jean in The Fisher of Shadows, the Charta Theatre
- 1935 played Captain Vanbrugh in Viceroy Sarah, Whitehall
- 1938 played Rudolf in Elizabeth of Austria, Garrick Theatre, London
- 1939 played Frederick in The Return of Peter Grimm, King's, Hammersmith
- 1944 played Osric in Hamlet, Old Vic Company, New Theatre, London

== Theatre career as director ==
- 1939 The Enchanted Cottage, Wilson Barrett Company, Empire Theatre, Edinburgh
- 1940 The Peaceful Inn, Duke of York's Theatre, London
- 1943 Sweet and Low (revue), Jack Pemberton production, Ambassadors Theatre, London
- 1944 Zero Hour, Duke of York's Theatre, London
- 1944 Daughter Janie, Apollo Theatre, London
- 1944 Sweeter and Lower (revue), Ambassadors, London
- 1945 Lady from Edinburgh, Playhouse Theatre, London
- 1945 Young Mrs Barrington
- 1945 The Vicar of Wakefield
- 1946 Song of Norway (musical), Emile Littler production, Palace Theatre, London
- 1946 Sweetest and Lowest, Ambassadors, London
- 1946 Mother Goose (pantomime), Casino Theatre, London
- 1947 Call Home the Heart
- 1947 Annie Get Your Gun, London Coliseum
- 1947 The Red Mill, Palace Theatre, London
- 1947 Outrageous Fortune, by Ben Travers, starring Ralph Lynn, Winter Garden Theatre
- 1947 The Blind Goddess, Apollo Theatre, London
- 1948 Cage Me a Peacock, Strand and Cambridge Theatres, London
- 1948 Little Lambs Eat Ivy, Ambassadors, London
- 1948 Slings and Arrows, (of which he was co-author)
- 1949 Breach of Marriage, Peter Saunders production, Duke of York's Theatre, London
- 1949 A Woman's Place, Vaudeville Theatre, London
- 1949 Black Chiffon, by Lesley Storm, starring Flora Robson, Westminster Theatre
- 1949 Bonaventura, Strand Theatre, London
- 1950 The School Mistress, Saville Theatre, London
- 1950 His Excellency, Princes Theatre (now Shaftesbury Theatre) London
- 1950 Dear Miss Phoebe, Emile Littler production, Phoenix Theatre, London
- 1950 Black Chiffon, 48th Street Theatre, New York
- 1950 Beauty and the Beast, Westminster Theatre, London
- 1951 Count Your Blessings, Wyndham's then Westminster Theatre, London
- 1951 Taking Things Quietly, Ambassadors Theatre, London
- 1951 Zip Goes a Million, Palace Theatre, London
- 1952 Sunset in Knightsbridge
- 1952 The Young Elizabeth, Criterion Theatre, London
- 1952 And If I Laugh, 'Q' Theatre Company, London
- 1952 Love from Judy, Emile Littler production, Saville Theatre, London
- 1952 Wild Horses, Aldwych Theatre, London
- 1953 The Man Upstairs,
- 1953 Red-Headed Blonde, Vaudeville Theatre, London
- 1953 Drama at Innish or is Life Worth Living?, Arts Theatre, London
- 1953 A London Actress
- 1954 Wedding in Paris, Hippodrome, Bristol then London Hippodrome
- 1954 The Party Spirit, Piccadilly Theatre, London
- 1955 The Tender Trap, Theatre Royal, London
- 1955 The Water Gypsies, Winter Garden Theatre, London
- 1956 Summer Song, Princes Theatre, London
- 1956 The Bride and the Bachelor, Duchess Theatre, London
- 1956 Bachelor Borne, Bristol Hippodrome
- 1957 Silver Wedding, Cambridge Theatre, London
- 1958 The Merry Widow, Bristol Hippodrome then Sadler's Wells, London
- 1958 Verdict, Strand Theatre, London
- 1958 The Big Tickle, Globe Theatre, London
- 1958 A Day in the Life of ... Savoy Theatre, London
- 1959 And Suddenly It's Spring, Duke of York's, London
- 1960 Land of Smiles, The Coliseum, London
- 1963 All Square, Vaudeville, London
- 1964 The Reluctant Peer, Duchess Theatre, London
- 1965 The Circle, Savoy Theatre, London
- 1965 The Last of Mrs Cheyney, Phoenix Theatre, London
- 1968 Oh, Clarence, Lyric Theatre, London
- 1973 Mistress of Novices, Piccadilly Theatre, London
- 1973 Any Other Business, Ambassadors, London
- 1974 The Dame of Sark, Wyndham's and Duke of York's, London
- 1979 A Murder is Announced, Vaudeville, London

== Film and TV ==
- 1931 played George in Compromising Daphne
- 1931 played Orville Wright (uncredited) in The Conquest of the Air
- 1932 played Eddie Kaye in Josser on the River
- 1933 Mayfair Girl
- 1933 played Son in Smithy
- 1934 played House detective (uncredited) in Girl in Danger
- 1935 played Sgt. Brace in Ten Minute Alibi
- 1938 played Alfie Hobson in They're Off! (TV Movie)
- 1939 played Ralph Mayne in The Infinite Shoeblack (TV Movie)
