= The Wrecking Crew (1968 film) =

1968 film by Phil Karlson

- Theatrical release poster by Robert McGinnis
- Directed by: Phil Karlson
- Screenplay by: William McGivern
- Based on: The Wrecking Crew by Donald Hamilton
- Produced by: Irving Allen
- Starring: Dean Martin; Elke Sommer; Sharon Tate; Nancy Kwan; Nigel Green; Tina Louise
- Cinematography: Sam Leavitt
- Edited by: Maury Winetrobe
- Music by: Hugo Montenegro
- Production company: Meadway-Claude Productions Company
- Distributed by: Columbia Pictures
- Release dates: December 25, 1968 (Canada); February 5, 1969 (New York City)
- Running time: 105 minutes
- Country: United States
- Language: English
- Box office: $2.4 million (US/Canada rentals)

The Wrecking Crew is a 1968 American spy comedy film directed by Phil Karlson and starring Dean Martin as Matt Helm, along with Elke Sommer, Sharon Tate, Nancy Kwan, Nigel Green, and Tina Louise. It is the fourth and final film in the Matt Helm series, and is loosely based on the 1960 novel of the same name by Donald Hamilton. The film opened in Canada in December 1968 before premiering in the United States in February 1969.

It was Tate's last film released before her death in 1969. It was also the Hollywood film debut for two future action movie stars: Bruce Lee, who worked behind the scenes as an action choreographer, and Chuck Norris, who made his film debut in a small role.

== Plot ==
Matt Helm is assigned by his secret agency, ICE, to bring down an evil count named Contini, who is trying to collapse the world economy by stealing a billion dollars in gold. Helm travels to Copenhagen, where he is given a guide, Freya Carlson, a beautiful but bumbling woman from a Danish tourism bureau.

A pair of Contini's accomplices, the seductive Linka Karensky and Wen Yurang, each attempt to foil Helm's plans. The former is killed in an ambush intended for Helm and the latter in an explosion. On each occasion, Freya's clumsy attempts to assist Helm are helpful but not particularly appreciated by him.

McDonald, Helm's chief at ICE, turns up to aid him but is wounded in action. McDonald confides to Helm that the seemingly inept Freya is actually a top-secret British agent herself, using a clever disguise. They go to Contini's chateau for a showdown, and Helm creates chaos and destruction with a variety of unique gadgets. Contini escapes with the gold on a train bound for Luxembourg, but Helm and Freya are able to catch up to him in a mini-helicopter. Freya is almost killed by Contini, but Helm rescues her, then kills Contini by throwing him through a trap door onto the railroad tracks. Successful and alone at last, Helm finally has an opportunity to thank an appreciative Freya.

== Cast ==
- Dean Martin as Matt Helm
- Elke Sommer as Linka Karensky
- Sharon Tate as Freya Carlson
- Nancy Kwan as Wen Yurang
- Nigel Green as Count Contini
- Tina Louise as Lola Medina
- John Larch as "Mac" MacDonald
- John Brascia as Karl
- Weaver Levy as Kim
- Ted Jordan as Guard

The film featured a number of wrestlers, boxers, and karate experts in small or uncredited roles, including Wilhelm von Homburg, Pepper Martin, Joe Gray, Joe Lewis, Ed Parker and – in his first screen role – Chuck Norris (background player in the House of 7 Joys scene). Bruce Lee does not appear in the film, but receives a production credit as "Karate advisor" (what would later be called an action choreographer) for training the actors and orchestrating the fight scenes.

The Wrecking Crew was Tate's last film released before her murder in August 1969.

== Production ==
The film is the first in the series to not be written or co-written by regular screenwriter Herbert Baker, who was working on Irving Allen's more serious spy film Hammerhead. The screenplay was written by former police reporter and crime novel author William P. McGivern.

Helm's chief at ICE, MacDonald, is played by John Larch in this film, replacing James Gregory, who played the role in the other three films. Gregory said in an interview in Filmfax magazine that he was sent a reduced amount for his fee in the film. He was told that the film was decreasing its budget, and Gregory refused to take the lower fee.

Bruce Lee, who worked on set as an action choreographer, remarked that he "tried to teach Dean Martin how to kick but he was too lazy and too clumsy" and that they had to mostly rely on stand-in Mike Stone. Lee stated that Sharon Tate and Nancy Kwan were better, "doing sidekicks pretty good with just a minimum of teaching". Lee said that Kwan approached him to become her private long-term teacher, but he told her that she would not be able to afford him.

The Wrecking Crew is the only film in the series not to feature Helm's secretary Lovey Kravesit, played by Beverly Adams, who was also appearing in Hammerhead. It is also the only movie in the series not to feature the villainous group BIG O.

Principal photography took place in California, with locations including Palm Springs, Idyllwild, and the Walt Disney owned Golden Oak Ranch.

== Music ==
Hugo Montenegro who wrote the score for The Ambushers returned to compose the score. Mack David and Frank DeVol wrote the theme song played over the opening and end credits, "House of Seven Joys", which was the working title of the film.

== Reception ==
=== Box office ===
The Wrecking Crew opened in New York in 44 theaters and despite the worst snowstorm in New York in eight years on the Sunday, grossed $316,000 in its first five days. In the United States and Canada, the film earned $2.4 million in theatrical rentals.

=== Legacy ===
The film ends with the announcement of a fifth Matt Helm entry, The Ravagers (which would have been based upon Hamilton's 1964 novel of the same title). However, Martin declined to return for another film in despair over the murder of Tate six months after the film's release. When Martin refused to make The Ravagers, Columbia held up Martin's share of the profits from the second Matt Helm film, Murderers' Row. The project was then cancelled.

Several years later, a Matt Helm TV series featuring Tony Franciosa was attempted, with Helm now a private detective.

Sharon Tate's biographer Greg King described The Wrecking Crew as containing probably the best performance in her short acting career. Contemporary reviews often praised her comedic role as a highlight of the film, in contrast with reviews of Tate’s earlier films which tended to focus on her physical appearance.

The Wrecking Crew is referenced and briefly seen in Quentin Tarantino's 2019 film Once Upon a Time in Hollywood, in which Tate (played by Margot Robbie) is shown enjoying the film at the Fox Bruin Theater.

The first name of Kwan's character is Yurang. The real Yu Rang was a Chinese assassin during the Spring and Autumn period.
