= Wayne Fitzgerald =

American film title designer (1930–2019)

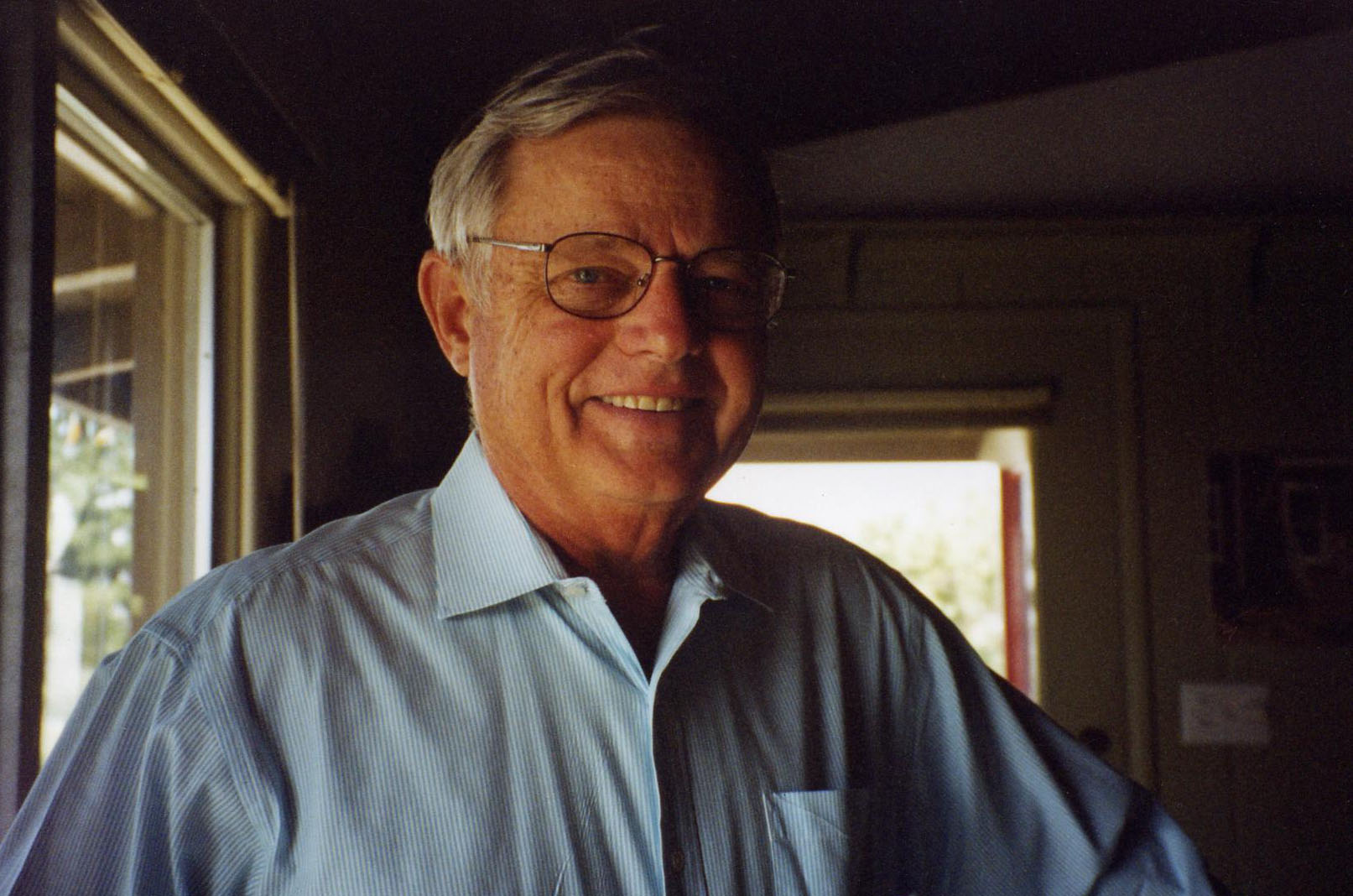
- Fitzgerald in 1987
- Born: March 19, 1930; Los Angeles, California, U.S.
- Died: September 30, 2019 (aged 89); Whidbey Island, Washington, U.S.
- Occupations: Television and motion picture title designer
- Years active: 1956–2003

Wayne Fitzgerald (March 19, 1930 – September 30, 2019) was an American film title designer. Over a career that spanned 55 years, he designed close to five hundred motion picture and television main and end title sequences for top directors such as Francis Ford Coppola, John Huston, Mike Nichols, Robert Redford, Roman Polanski, Arthur Penn, Michael Cimino, Warren Beatty, Herbert Ross, John Hughes, and Quentin Tarantino.

== Film title work ==
A native of Los Angeles, Fitzgerald graduated from Art Center College of Design in 1951, and went to work at Pacific Title & Art Studio. His first major motion picture title design was for MGM's Raintree County (1957). He worked on a great many titles during his 17-year tenure at Pacific Title, becoming head of the art and design department. During that time, Pacific Title did all the motion picture title work for Warner Bros., MGM, and 20th Century Fox, as well as some for Paramount Pictures and Columbia Pictures, plus independents. Neither Pacific Title nor its employees received title design credit. As a result, Fitzgerald did not receive credit for many of his early designs, such as The Three Faces of Eve (1957), Imitation of Life (1959), Pillow Talk (also 1959), The Music Man (1962), My Fair Lady (1964); or for early television shows such as Maverick (1957), Mister Ed (1961), and The Beverly Hillbillies (1962).

In addition to providing an entertaining background for the credits, Fitzgerald's titles often set the mood. For The Music Man he directed a group of 35 technicians who built sets and painted and animated the musical instruments and marching band. He then shot and edited the sequence.

In the film Max Dugan Returns (1983), the title character does not appear for half an hour. Fitzgerald's titles with Bob Kurtz animation provided a background for the character. For Bonnie and Clyde (1967), Fitzgerald used old snapshots and a quick-cut style driven by sound that melded seamlessly with film editor Dede Allen's editorial style. The photos established the mood and look of the 1930s, and referenced the fact that Bonnie and Clyde were known for taking snapshots of themselves, which they sent to the press. Until the music starts to fade in, the only sound is the click of a Brownie camera.

While working together on Bonnie and Clyde, Warren Beatty convinced Fitzgerald to strike out on his own. He left his job as head of the art department at Pacific Title and formed Wayne Fitzgerald FilmDesign. Chinatown (1974), Nine to Five (1980), Footloose (1984), Total Recall (1990), to name a few, followed. In addition to opening titles, Fitzgerald shot second unit and edited montage sequences for Rocky III and Tootsie (both 1982).

Fitzgerald also continued to design titles for prime time television shows Night Gallery (1971), McMillan & Wife (1971), Dallas (1978 - 1988), Matlock (1986), and Columbo (1971–75). He won an Emmy Award in 1987 for The Bronx Zoo.

He also designed for the daytime soap operas The Bold and the Beautiful (CBS) 1987 (EMMY 1987), One Life to Live (ABC) 1984, and The Guiding Light (CBS) 1991 (EMMY 1992), and again in 2002 with his son Eric, Fitzgerald, also a title designer.

In 1993, he briefly joined the digital graphic design firm, Pittard-Sullivan. It became Pittard-Sullivan-Fitzgerald. Fitzgerald's last work with the company was in 1995, after which he reformed his company, Wayne Fitzgerald FilmDesign, Inc.

In 1995, Fitzgerald designed the logo for the Motion Picture Editors Guild.

== Personal life ==
Fitzgerald was a member of the Directors Guild of America. He was a two-term governor in the Academy of Television Arts and Sciences, representing title designers, and a member of the Academy of Motion Picture Arts and Sciences. He lectured at UCLA and AFI, and participated in panel discussions in Los Angeles and New York. He also taught at Art Center College of Design.

Fitzgerald died September 30, 2019, aged 89.

== Filmography ==
=== Select Pacific Title (1956–1968) titles ===
- Raintree County (1957)
- Auntie Mame (1958)
- The Diary of Anne Frank (1959)
- Imitation of Life (1959)
- Pillow Talk (1959)
- Judgment at Nuremberg (1961)
- The Music Man (1962)
- My Fair Lady (1964)
- Cat Ballou (1965)
- Battle of the Bulge (1965)
- Inside Daisy Clover (1965)
- The Silencers (1966)
- Who's Afraid of Virginia Woolf? (1966)
- Murderers' Row (1966)
- In the Heat of the Night (1967)
- Bonnie and Clyde (1967)
- Who's Minding the Mint? (1967)
- Camelot (1967)
- The Ambushers (1967)
- Cool Hand Luke (1967)
- Guess Who's Coming to Dinner (1967)
- The Graduate (1967)
- Rosemary's Baby (1968)
- The Green Berets (1968)
- Funny Girl (1968)

=== Wayne Fitzgerald/FilmDesign (1968–1993) ===
- Alice's Restaurant (1969)
- On a Clear Day You Can See Forever (1970)
- Catch-22 (1970)
- Little Big Man (1970)
- The Owl and the Pussycat (1970)
- Mame (1974)
- The Conversation (1974)
- Chinatown (1974)
- Alice Doesn't Live Here Anymore (1974)
- The Godfather: Part II (1974)
- Funny Lady (1975)
- Mitchell (1975)
- One Flew Over the Cuckoo's Nest (1975)
- The Missouri Breaks (1976)
- Slap Shot (1977)
- The Turning Point (1977)
- The Goodbye Girl (1977)
- Heaven Can Wait (1978)
- Who Is Killing the Great Chefs of Europe? (1978)
- The Deer Hunter (1978)
- Grease (high school yearbook end titles)
- California Suite (1978)
- Apocalypse Now (1979) (end titles)
- The Muppet Movie (1979)
- North Dallas Forty (1979)
- The Electric Horseman (1979)
- Private Benjamin (1980)
- Nine to Five (1980)
- Reds (1981)
- Pennies From Heaven (1981)
- Body Heat (1981)
- Tootsie (1982)
- Annie (1982)
- The Outsiders (1983)
- Vacation (1983)
- The Big Chill (1983)
- Terms of Endearment (1983)
- Splash (1984)
- Footloose (1984)
- Sixteen Candles (1984)
- The Breakfast Club (1985)
- Down and Out in Beverly Hills (1986)
- Black Widow (1987)
- The Milagro Beanfield War (1988)
- Total Recall (1990)
- Ghost (1990)
- Dick Tracy (1990)
- City Slickers (1991)
- Basic Instinct (1992)
- White Men Can't Jump (1992)
- A River Runs Through It (1992)
- Scent of a Woman (1992)

=== Pittard/Sullivan/Fitzgerald (1993–1995) ===
- Groundhog Day (1993)
- Grumpy Old Men (1993)
- Wyatt Earp (1994)
- Maverick (1994)
- Waterworld (1995)

=== Wayne Fitzgerald/Filmdesign (1995–2003) ===
- Diabolique (1996)
- The Rainmaker (1997)
- Beverly Hills Ninja (1997)
- RocketMan (1997)
- Kingpin (1996)
- Nobody's Baby (with Eric Fitzgerald/Hollywood Title) (2001)
- Hollywood Homicide (with Eric Fitzgerald/Hollywood Title) (2003)

== Awards ==
Fitzgerald won a Primetime Emmy with David Oliver Pfeil for outstanding main title design on The Bronx Zoo in 1987. He won Daytime Emmys for The Bold and the Beautiful in 1987, and The Guiding Light in 1992. He was nominated for Daytime Emmys in 1994 with Judy Korin for Days of Our Lives, and with Eric Fitzgerald in 2003 for The 50th Anniversary Season of The Guiding Light.
