= Matt Helm (disambiguation) =

Matt Helm is a fictional government assassin created in 1960 by author Donald Hamilton.

Matt Helm may also refer to:

- Matt Helm (TV series), a 1975-76 American television series based on the Donald Hamilton character
- Mathew Helm (b. 1980), an Australian competitive diver
