= The Wrecking Crew =

(The) Wrecking Crew may refer to:

== Film ==
- Wrecking Crew (1942 film), an American film directed by Frank McDonald
- The Wrecking Crew (1968 film), a film starring Dean Martin and Sharon Tate
- The Wrecking Crew (2000 film), an action film starring Ice-T and Snoop Dogg
- The Wrecking Crew (2008 film), a documentary film directed by Denny Tedesco
- The Wrecking Crew (2026 film), an American buddy cop action comedy film

== Literature ==
- Wrecking Crew (comics), a Marvel Comics group of supervillains
- The Wrecking Crew (novel), a 1960 spy novel by Donald Hamilton
- The Wrecking Crew (Frank book), a 2008 nonfiction book by Thomas Frank
- The Wrecking Crew (Wodehouse), a foursome of golfers, created by P.G. Wodehouse in 1923, infamous for their tedious pace of play
- The Wrecking Crew: The Inside Story of Rock and Roll's Best-Kept Secret, a 2012 book by Kent Hartman

== Music ==
- The Wrecking Crew (music), a group of session musicians known for working with Phil Spector and the Beach Boys
- World Class Wreckin' Cru, a 1980s group featuring Dr. Dre (and originally known as the Wreckin' Cru)
- Wrecking Crew, a Boston hardcore band featuring Elgin James
- Wreckin' Crew, a 1983 album by The Meteors
- The Wrecking Crew, a South African hip-hop collective including A-Reece

== Video games ==
- Wrecking Crew (video game), a 1984 video game
- Wrecking Crew '98, 1998 sequel to the aforementioned game

== Sports ==
=== Wrestling ===
- The Minnesota Wrecking Crew (professional wrestling), a professional wrestling tag team formed by Gene and Lars Anderson
- Minnesota Wrecking Crew 2, a professional wrestling tag team featuring Mike Enos and Wayne Bloom
- The Wrecking Crew, a professional wrestling tag team, active in the late 1980s with Brian Adams and Len Denton
- The Wrecking Crew, a professional wrestling tag team, active in the early 1990s with Rage and Fury

=== American football ===
- The Wrecking Crew, a term to describe the defense of the Texas A&M University football team
- Big Blue Wrecking Crew, a nickname for the New York Giants

== Other uses ==
- The Minnesota Wrecking Crew, a Canadian sketch comedy troupe
