= The Ambushers =

The Ambushers may refer to:

- The Ambushers (novel), a 1963 novel by Donald Hamilton
- The Ambushers (film), a 1967 American spy comedy film, based on the novel
