= Herbert Baker (screenwriter) =

American screenwriter (1920–1983)

Herbert Baker (born Herbert Joseph Abrahams; December 25, 1920, New York City – June 30, 1983, Encino, Los Angeles, California) was a songwriter and screenwriter for television and films.

== Biography ==
The only son of composer Maurice Abrahams and singer Belle Baker, Herbert attended Yale School of Drama, receiving a Bachelor of Fine Arts. His first Broadway credit was in 1944 as the lyricist of Erich Wolfgang Korngold's arrangement of Offenbach's La Belle Helene as well as other songs and musical pieces for the Broadway musical,Helen Goes to Troy

== Screenwriting ==
In 1945, Baker wrote for the Danny Kaye radio show. Henry Morgan hired Baker to write for his radio show in 1947. Baker began his career in screenwriting in 1948 with Morgan's film debut So This Is New York, co-written with Carl Foreman and based upon Ring Lardner's 1920 novel The Big Town. Baker was a Yale classmate of director Richard Fleischer and recommended him to Stanley Kramer for So This Is New York.

He wrote Dream Wife (1953) with Sidney Sheldon for Cary Grant and Deborah Kerr, as well as several films for Dean Martin and Jerry Lewis such as Jumping Jacks (1951), Scared Stiff (1953), and Artists and Models (1955). The latter film was directed and co-written by Frank Tashlin, with whom Baker worked again on The Girl Can't Help It.

Baker kept writing songs, including new ones for Rose Marie (1954). He contributed to two Elvis Presley films, Loving You and King Creole. After Martin and Lewis split up, Baker wrote Don't Give Up the Ship for Jerry Lewis and worked on Lewis's television show. One of Baker's best popular songs was written in the mid-1950s, I Love To Love, famously recorded by Lena Horne on her 'Live at the Waldorf Astoria' album and also recorded by Peggy Lee.

Baker entered television writing and won Emmy Awards for An Evening With Fred Astaire in 1959 and The Flip Wilson Show in 1971. He was nominated twice for The Flip Wilson Show in 1972 and 1973 and was nominated in 1964 for The Danny Kaye Show. Baker wrote television scripts for many other singers such as Perry Como, Frank Sinatra, John Denver, Mac Davis and Gladys Knight & the Pips. He wrote a television pilot for a version of Some Like It Hot in 1961.

In 1965, Baker wrote for The Dean Martin Show. When Martin agreed to star in and co-produce a series of Matt Helm spy films for producer Irving Allen in the same year, Baker rewrote the screenplay Oscar Saul (A Streetcar Named Desire) had based on the original Matt Helm novels written by Donald Hamilton to reflect Dean Martin's Rat Pack reputation for the third and final draft of The Silencers but only received a screen credit for the song parodies he wrote for Martin.

Baker received sole credit for Murderers' Row that Oscar Saul had rewritten but Baker rewrote again. He wrote the third Matt Helm film, The Ambushers, and later wrote a serious spy adventure for Irving Allen, Hammerhead, based on James Mayo's "Charles Hood" character. Baker's final screen credit was The Jazz Singer in 1980.

Baker taught music and mentored jazz saxophonist Azar Lawrence who recalled Baker as "one of the greatest pianists who ever lived" and taught Lawrence to reach down inside himself for his music.

A member of the Writers Guild of America, west board, Baker was awarded the Paddy Chayefsky Laurel Award from the Guild in 1983.

== Links ==
- The Herbert Baker box papers 1939-1978
