= The Menacers =

1968 novel by Donald Hamilton

- Original 1968 paperback cover
- Author: Donald Hamilton
- Cover artist: John McDermott
- Language: English
- Series: Matt Helm
- Genre: Spy novel
- Publisher: Fawcett Publications
- Publication date: 1968
- Publication place: United States
- Media type: Print (Paperback)
- Pages: 192 pp
- ISBN: 0-402-27172-6
- Preceded by: The Betrayers
- Followed by: The Interlopers

The Menacers, first published in 1968, was the eleventh novel in the Matt Helm spy series by Donald Hamilton and the first published since the launch of the Matt Helm film series starring Dean Martin.

== Plot summary ==
For reasons unknown, flying saucers apparently with United States Air Force markings have begun attacking locations in Mexico. Helm's mission is to transport a witness to one of these attacks to Washington, and to stop her at all costs from being captured by Soviet agents, even if that means killing her.

== Film connection ==
The flying saucer aspect of the plot was loosely borrowed for the 1967 Matt Helm film The Ambushers, starring Dean Martin (which was otherwise mostly based on the novel The Ambushers).
