= The Interlopers (novel) =

1969 novel by Donald Hamilton

- 1969 paperback edition
- Author: Donald Hamilton
- Cover artist: John McDermott
- Language: English
- Series: Matt Helm
- Genre: Spy novel
- Publisher: Fawcett Publications
- Publication date: 1969
- Publication place: United States
- Media type: Print (Paperback)
- Preceded by: The Menacers
- Followed by: The Poisoners

The Interlopers, first published in 1969, was the twelfth novel in the Matt Helm spy series by Donald Hamilton, which began in 1960. It represents a middle period in the Helm novels, being about 80,000 words in length, somewhat longer than the first four or five in the series, but considerably shorter than most of the Helm books of the eighties and nineties, which were generally well over 100,000 words in length. At this intermediate length, the action moved swiftly while still allowing for plot complications, but avoided the occasional padded-out-by-dialogue tedium of the later books.

== Plot summary ==
The book was apparently written after the troubled year of 1968, which saw the assassination of Martin Luther King Jr. and of Robert F. Kennedy a few weeks later, as well as political turmoil and anti-Vietnam demonstrations in the United States. Mac, the director of Helm's secret government agency, learns that a dangerous enemy operative, Hans Holz, also known as the Woodman, has been contracted, presumably by the Soviets, to kill whichever candidate is elected in the upcoming elections in November 1968. The Woodman, it appears, has also recently been responsible for the death of Michael Kingston, an agent with whom Helm has just worked in an earlier book. Helm, the veteran counter-assassin, is ordered by Mac to get into position to remove the Woodman—permanently. Not to avenge Kingston — Mac's agents are supposed to be able to take care of themselves — but to forestall any more political chaos.

As frequently happens in Hamilton's books, however, Helm is not sent to stalk Holz directly. He is inserted into an operation currently being carried out by a rival government agency, one that is trying to thwart Communist plans to obtain secret information about a major American-Canadian security project called the Northwest Coastal System. A man named Grant Nystrom has been recruited by the Communists to take delivery at five different points of microfilms of the project as he travels through the Northwest and into Alaska playing the role of a dedicated fisherman. Both Nystrom and his trained Labrador dog have recently been murdered, however, and Helm resembles Nystrom enough to enable him to take his place.

A standard plot device in Helm stories is to have a second government agency working either at complete cross-purposes to Mac's agency, or at least at semi-cross-purposes. Helm is recruited to apparently carry out the instructions of the second agency but actually has his own mission to accomplish, regardless of how this may finally thwart the wishes of the other agency. In The Interlopers this tension runs throughout the book—and is complicated by the fact that a mysterious third party, the so-called interlopers, appears with a Grant Nystrom lookalike of their own, complete with his own black Labrador, in an apparent attempt to accumulate the secret microfilm for their own purposes.

There are, as in all Helm books, at least two beautiful, and somewhat mysterious, women, whose patriotic affiliations are questionable right to the end of the story, and who cause both complications and murderous attacks on Helm. He survives the attacks, however, in the course of which he kills, mostly by guns, but occasionally by knife, at least six or seven enemy operatives of various loyalties. On page 89, in a motel cabin surrounded by dead bodies, he is obliged to set the scene for the forthcoming policemen by leaving behind the small four-inch-bladed knife that has been featured in most of the books since the very first — "it had been given to me by a woman, now dead, who'd once meant a good deal to me — but this was no time for sentimentality."

Other standard features in many of the Helm books play their roles here. Hamilton likes to carry an occasional character from one story to the next. One of the numerous conflicting groups interested in obtaining the secret microfilm is apparently directed by an unseen Chinese agent named Mr. Soo. Although he himself makes no appearance in The Interlopers, he had come to Helm's aid in the previous book, The Menacers, and will show up again in a future book.

Another feature is the last page or so of Hamilton's books, after the action has been completed. A minor (but beautiful) female character unexpectedly reappears, either in need of physical and spiritual recuperation herself or there to offer it to the severely tested Helm. As usual, there is a two- or three-word final paragraph:

"It was Mac's idea of a safe rest and rehabilitation for both of us — simpler, cheaper, and less obvious than turning the wigpickers loose on us; and more effective if it worked.

"It worked."

And as in many of the books, Helm also finds time to reflect on the deficiencies of Detroit automakers: "Even commercial vehicles are encumbered with a lot of Mickey Mouse gadgets these days — that big, rugged, powerful truck engine was decorated with a cute little automatic choke, for God's sake! Apparently modern-day truck drivers are considered too stupid and feeble to pull a knob out of a dashboard."

One feature in The Interlopers that is not a standard Hamilton plot device occurs on page 175 when, for one of the very few times in the series, the super-competent and super-foresighted Helm falls into an enemy ambush that he had not planned for or anticipated. After waking up bound hand and foot, he reflects "grimly" that "knowing that the critical moment of the mission had to be close at hand, I'd let the frantic howling of a year-old pup send me rushing blindly into an ambush any first-year trainee could have avoided in his sleep."

In spite of this single moment of weakness, however, Helm, with a little help from various female characters as well as his "year-old pup", manages to carry out his mission successfully.
