= The Vanishers =

1986 spy novel by Donald Hamilton

- 1986 paperback edition
- Author: Donald Hamilton
- Language: English
- Series: Matt Helm
- Genre: Spy
- Publisher: Fawcett Publications
- Publication date: 1986
- Publication place: United States
- Media type: Print (paperback)
- Pages: 295 pp
- ISBN: 0-449-12967-5
- OCLC: 14222977
- Preceded by: The Detonators
- Followed by: The Demolishers

The Vanishers is a 1986 spy novel by Donald Hamilton. It is the twenty-third book in a series of novels featuring the adventures of assassin Matt Helm.

== Plot summary ==
While Mac (Helm's boss) is on a rare solo assignment, elements within Mac's agency try to take power away from him. It's up to Helm to stop this coup in its tracks, while simultaneously dealing with some deadly family-related issues of his own. Meanwhile, in a storyline continued from The Annihilators, Mac finds himself in the middle of yet another revolution in Costa Verde.

The Vanishers, one of the more complicated Matt Helm stories, is unique in several ways. Usually Helm is captured by the enemy in order to complete his mission. Here, for once, Helm’s boss Mac takes an active part in the action and is the one captured in order to deal with a gang of kidnappers. In most of these books the women are either ruthless foreign agents or naïve Americans who discover that however nice Helm may be personally, his profession is not at all nice. The Vanishers features a woman who is neither naïve nor an enemy. As punishment for a previous mistake in judgment, Helm is excluded from the real national security problem and exiled to Sweden, where he is kidnapped by a group who fear he may interfere with their plans. Eventually he escapes, figures out his mission and completes it, and helps the Swedes with their mission. The ending is different from any other Matt Helm book, but is consistent with his character.
