= The Silencers (film) =

1966 film by Phil Karlson

- Theatrical release poster
- Directed by: Phil Karlson
- Screenplay by: Oscar Saul
- Based on: The Silencers by Donald Hamilton
- Produced by: Irving Allen
- Starring: Dean Martin; Stella Stevens; Daliah Lavi; Victor Buono; Arthur O'Connell; Robert Webber; James Gregory; Roger C. Carmel; Beverly Adams; Cyd Charisse
- Cinematography: Burnett Guffey
- Edited by: Charles Nelson
- Music by: Elmer Bernstein
- Production company: Meadway-Claude Productions Company
- Distributed by: Columbia Pictures
- Release dates: February 18, 1966 (Chicago); March 16, 1966 (United States)
- Running time: 102 minutes
- Country: United States
- Language: English
- Box office: $16.3 million

The Silencers is a 1966 American spy comedy film directed by Phil Karlson, starring Dean Martin as agent Matt Helm. The screenplay by Oscar Saul is based on the 1962 novel of the same name by Donald Hamilton, while also adapting elements of Hamilton's first Helm novel, Death of a Citizen (1960). The film co-stars Stella Stevens, Daliah Lavi, Victor Buono, Arthur O'Connell, Robert Webber, James Gregory, Roger C. Carmel, Beverly Adams, and Cyd Charisse.

It is notable as being the first film to have a post-credits scene.

== Plot ==
Once a photographer by day and spy by night, Matt Helm is now a happily retired secret agent, shooting photos of glamorous models instead of guns and enjoying a close relationship with his assistant, the lovely Lovey Kravezit. But then his old boss, Macdonald, coaxes him back to the agency ICE (Intelligence and Counter Espionage) to thwart a new threat from the villainous organization Big O.

The sinister Tung-Tze is masterminding a diabolical scheme to drop a missile on an underground atomic bomb test in New Mexico and possibly instigate a nuclear war in the process. Helm's assignment is to stop him, armed with a wide assortment of useful spy gadgets, plus the assistance of the capable femme fatale, Tina, and the seemingly incapable Gail Hendricks, a beautiful but bumbling possible enemy agent.

Along the way, Helm is nearly sidetracked by a mysterious knife-wielding seductress and he witnesses the murder of a beautiful Big O operative, the sultry striptease artist Sarita.

In the end, Helm prevails, with Gail by his side as he all but singlehandedly destroys Tung-Tze's evil enterprise and plot to rule the world.

== Cast ==
- Dean Martin as Matt Helm
- Stella Stevens as Gail Hendricks
- Daliah Lavi as Tina
- Victor Buono as Tung-Tze
- Arthur O'Connell as Wigman
- Robert Webber as Sam Gunther
- James Gregory as Macdonald
- Nancy Kovack as Barbara
- Roger C. Carmel as Andreyev
- Cyd Charisse as Sarita
- Beverly Adams as Lovey Kravezit
- Richard Devon as Domino
- Patrick Waltz as hotel clerk

== Production ==
=== Development ===
Film producer Irving Allen had been in partnership with Albert R. Broccoli in Warwick Productions, who released through Columbia Pictures. Broccoli wanted to buy the rights to the James Bond series of novels, but Allen was not interested. The partnership broke up, Broccoli went into partnership with Harry Saltzman and United Artists on the Bond films and enjoyed tremendous success.

Allen decided to make his own spy series. He read a copy of one of the Matt Helm novels at an airport - "The Silencers or The Death of a Citizen, I forget which," he said later - and optioned the film rights in twenty four hours with his own money ("and it was a sizeable amount" he said).

In 1964 he set up the series with Columbia Pictures. The Silencers was to be the first.

=== Casting ===
Dean Martin was not the original choice for the lead. Allen said "We had wanted Paul Newman or one of the good stars but no one would go up against Sean Connery. Nobody wants to go up against a successful series." Mike Connors was strongly considered for the role, instead Columbia recommended him for a Dino DeLaurentiis imitation Bond film Kiss the Girls and Make Them Die directed by Henry Levin who would direct the second and third Matt Helm film.

Eventually it was decided to make the film a comedy and Allen suggested Dean Martin play Matt Helm. Martin signed in March 1965.

Director Phil Karlson had the idea to make the film in a tongue-in-cheek style. Comedy writer Herbert Baker revised Oscar Saul's original script.

Martin was a co-producer of the Helm series. Moss Mabry provided the costumes, except for Martin's Sy Devore suits.

Richard Levinson and William Link also worked on the script of this and The Ambushers, the third film in the Matt Helm series.

=== Themes ===
The film was the first of four produced between 1966 and 1969 starring Martin. The film series includes James Gregory as Macdonald, Helm's superior (played by John Larch in the fourth film) and Beverly Adams as Lovey Kravezit, Helm's photo assistant (character missing in fourth film). Whereas Hamilton's books were generally serious spy novels about a former Second World War assassin who is recruited to continue killing for an American government agency, the film versions were lighthearted spy romps spoofing the James Bond series in the same spirit as Our Man Flint, which was released the previous month. The Helm series has been cited as one of the principal inspirations for the Austin Powers spy comedies of the 1990s and early 2000s.

== Reception ==
Released at the height of James Bond mania, The Silencers was a major box office hit in 1966, earning $7 million in United States rentals that year.

"It was a very lucky thing," said Allen, "great timing that Helm caught on the same time Dean's TV series took off."

There were three follow-up films, including Murderers' Row (also released in 1966), The Ambushers (1967) and The Wrecking Crew (1968). A fifth film, The Ravagers, was announced, but never produced.

== Soundtrack ==
Elmer Bernstein provided the score. The title song is performed by Vikki Carr, though Cyd Charisse opens the film with a sexy striptease-style dance while lip synching to Carr's vocals. Carr also sings "Santiago" on the soundtrack. Two soundtrack albums were released — Bernstein's original score on an RCA Victor album that does not feature any artwork of Dean Martin, and a Reprise album by Martin singing several songs that were featured in the film, along with some instrumentals by the Mike Leander Orchestra.

A scopitone video of the title song was sung by Joi Lansing. Carr's version of the title song was also used on the soundtrack of the film Confessions of a Dangerous Mind.

Lovey Kravezit, a song by Howard Greenfield and Jack Keller that wasn't in the film appeared as an instrumental on the Dean Martin Sings Songs from "The Silencers" album with The Everly Brothers doing a vocal version.

In 2016, English label Vocalion issued the soundtrack on a CD, catalog number CDLK4573.

== Adaptation ==
The Silencers borrows a plot element from the first Helm novel, Death of a Citizen, as it begins with the agent being coaxed out of retirement. Helm's mission is to stop an evil organization called "BIG O" (the Bureau for International Government and Order) from their plan of "Operation Fallout": diverting an American missile into an underground atomic bomb testing site in New Mexico.
