= The Silencers (novel) =

1962 novel by Donald Hamilton

- Paperback original
- Author: Donald Hamilton
- Language: English
- Series: Matt Helm
- Genre: Spy fiction, Novel
- Publisher: Fawcett Publications
- Publication date: 1962
- Publication place: United States
- Media type: Print (Paperback)
- Preceded by: The Removers
- Followed by: Murderers' Row

The Silencers is the title of a 1962 spy novel by Donald Hamilton, the fourth in a series of books featuring assassin Matt Helm.

== Plot summary ==
When a female agent in Mexico is killed before Helm can complete his mission to extract her, he finds himself teamed up with the woman's sister as he fights to save the lives of a number of scientists and Congressmen.

== Film adaptation ==
The Silencers has the distinction of being the first Matt Helm novel adapted as a film. The movie version was released in 1966 and starred Dean Martin as Helm. Rather than follow Hamilton's storyline, the filmmakers took elements of the plot, combined it with elements of the first Helm book, Death of a Citizen, and cast the story in a comedic vein, spoofing the James Bond film franchise.
