= The Betrayers =

1966 novel by Donald Hamilton, republished in 2014

- Original 1966 paperback cover
- Author: Donald Hamilton
- Cover artist: John McDermott
- Language: English
- Series: Matt Helm
- Genre: Spy novel
- Publisher: Fawcett Publications
- Publication date: 1966
- Publication place: United States
- Media type: Print (paperback)
- ISBN: 0340029897
- OCLC: 2350647
- Preceded by: The Devastators
- Followed by: The Menacers

The Betrayers is the tenth novel in the Matt Helm spy series by Donald Hamilton, which originated with Death of a Citizen in 1960. This novel was first published in 1966. It was reissued in 2014 by Titan Books.

Up to this point, Hamilton had maintained a publishing schedule of at least one Helm novel annually, sometimes more than one. Readers would have to wait until 1968 until the release of the next Matt Helm novel, The Menacers.

== Plot summary ==
During a holiday in Hawaii, Helm finds himself facing an old enemy who plans to accelerate the Vietnam War into a worldwide conflict.
