= The Poisoners (Hamilton novel) =

1971 novel by Donald Hamilton

- 1971 paperback edition
- Author: Donald Hamilton
- Language: English
- Series: Matt Helm
- Genre: Spy novel
- Publisher: Fawcett Publications
- Publication date: 1971
- Publication place: United States
- Media type: Print (Paperback)
- ISBN: 0-449-02502-0
- Preceded by: The Interlopers
- Followed by: The Intriguers

The Poisoners was the first Matt Helm novel of the 1970s. It was first published in 1971, as the thirteenth novel in the spy series by Donald Hamilton.

== Plot summary ==
After a novice secret agent (Annette from The Menacers) is murdered—assassin Matt Helm (code name "Eric") is assigned to eliminate her killer, and find out why she was killed in the first place.
