= The Ravagers (novel) =

1964 novel by Donald Hamilton

- 1964 paperback edition
- Author: Donald Hamilton
- Cover artist: John McDermott
- Language: English
- Series: Matt Helm
- Genre: Spy novel
- Publisher: Fawcett Publications
- Publication date: 1964
- Publication place: United States
- Media type: Print (Paperback)
- Pages: 144 pp
- Preceded by: The Shadowers
- Followed by: The Devastators

The Ravagers is a novel by Donald Hamilton that was first published in 1964. It was the eighth novel in his long-running series of adventures featuring secret agent Matt Helm.

== Plot summary ==
Matt Helm is sent to Canada where his assignment is to stop a scheme to bring a Soviet submarine within striking distance of the United States.

== Film adaptation plans ==
In the 1960s, a series of popular motion pictures based upon the Matt Helm series were produced starring Dean Martin. These films only loosely adapted their source material, choosing to adopt a comedic tone rather than the serious tone of Hamilton's books. At the end of the fourth film, 1969's The Wrecking Crew, it is announced that Matt Helm's next cinematic adventure would be The Ravagers (presumably based upon this novel). Martin, however, declined to return to the role for a fifth time, and the film was never made. Sharon Tate, his co-star in the fourth film, was to have co-starred in The Ravagers (the first of Helm's female companions to make a return appearance) but was murdered by the Manson Family in August 1969. Martin had pre-approval of his co-star and was not happy with the alternatives that Columbia Pictures presented and wanted Goldie Hawn to co-star. Hawn wanted $150,000 to appear, which Columbia wasn't prepared to pay. An alternate account by Martin biographer Nick Tosches suggests Martin pulled out of the film due to being upset at Tate's death.
