= Retaliator =

Retaliator or variants may refer to:

- F29 Retaliator, combat flight simulator video game 1989
- The Retaliators (novel), novel in Matt Helm series
- The Retaliators (film), American thriller film
