= Let Sleeping Girls Lie =

1965 novel

- 1969 Pan paperback
- Author: James Mayo
- Language: English
- Series: Charles Hood
- Genre: Spy thriller
- Publisher: Heinemann
- Publication date: 1965
- Publication place: United Kingdom
- Media type: Print
- Preceded by: Hammerhead
- Followed by: Shamelady

Let Sleeping Girls Lie is a 1965 spy thriller novel by the British writer Stephen Coulter, published under the pen name James Mayo. It is the second in a series of five novels by Coulter, featuring the British secret agent Charles Hood. The series was an attempt to capitalise on the popularity of the James Bond novels and films. It was published in London by Heinemann and New York City by William Morrow. While the book sold well, it received a poor critical reception. Writer Anthony Boucher's review noted "Let Sleeping Girls Lie has loads of sex, sadism and snobbery, and no sense at all of plot or structure". although he praised the novel's action and sex scenes. The first Hood novel Hammerhead was made into film of the same title in 1968, but the poor reception ended producer Irving Allen's plans to film the sequels and create a rival to the Bond series.

== Bibliography ==
- Britton, Wesley Alan. Beyond Bond: Spies in Fiction and Film. Greenwood Publishing Group, 2005.
- Burton, Alan. Looking-Glass Wars: Spies on British Screens since 1960. Vernon Press, 2018.
- Reilly, John M. Twentieth Century Crime & Mystery Writers. Springer, 2015.
