= The Shadowers =

1964 novel by Donald Hamilton

- Original 1964 paperback cover
- Author: Donald Hamilton
- Cover artist: John McDermott
- Language: English
- Series: Matt Helm
- Genre: Spy novel
- Publisher: Fawcett Publications
- Publication date: 1964
- Publication place: United States
- Media type: Print (Paperback)
- Pages: 142 pp
- Preceded by: The Ambushers
- Followed by: The Ravagers

The Shadowers is a novel by Donald Hamilton first published in 1964, continuing the exploits of assassin Matt Helm. It was the seventh novel of the series.

== Plot summary ==
Matt Helm, code name "Eric" is assigned to stop Emil Taussig, whose goal is to assassinate world leaders and scientists as a prelude to a Russian attack.
