= Texas fever (disambiguation) =

Texas fever is a disease caused by infection with Babesia.

Texas fever may also refer to:

- Texas Fever, an album by Orange Juice
- Texas Fever (novel), a novel by Donald Hamilton
