= The Damagers =

1993 novel by Donald Hamilton

- 1993 paperback edition
- Author: Donald Hamilton
- Language: English
- Series: Matt Helm
- Genre: Spy
- Publisher: Fawcett Publications
- Publication date: 1993
- Publication place: United States
- Media type: Print (paperback)
- Pages: 35 pp ?
- ISBN: 0-449-14847-5
- OCLC: 29418905
- LC Class: MLC R CP00978
- Preceded by: The Threateners
- Followed by: The Dominators (unpublished)

The Damagers, published in 1993, is a spy novel by Donald Hamilton, and the twenty-seventh volume of the adventures of government assassin Matt Helm. Hamilton had launched the series in 1960 with Death of a Citizen and this novel is a sequel to the second Helm book, The Wrecking Crew, also from 1960.

The Damagers is, to date, the final Matt Helm novel to be published. Hamilton did complete a twenty-eighth novel, The Dominators in 2002 (he died in 2006), but as of 2015 this book remains unpublished.

== Plot summary ==
Matt Helm brings his literary career to a close (for now) with a double assignment: destroy a crime gang run by the son of the villain from The Wrecking Crew, and prevent the atomic destruction of Norfolk, Virginia.
