= The Dominators (novel) =

2002 novel by Donald Hamilton

- Author: Donald Hamilton
- Language: English
- Series: Matt Helm
- Genre: Spy
- Publisher: NA
- Publication date: Unpublished; written circa 2002
- Publication place: United States
- Media type: Manuscript
- Preceded by: The Damagers

The Dominators is the title of an unpublished novel by Donald Hamilton. The book, which was completed in the early 2000s, was intended to be the 28th novel in Hamilton's Matt Helm spy series, continuing the adventures of the character introduced in the 1960 novel Death of a Citizen and later popularized (in a comedic vein) by actor Dean Martin in a series of late-1960s motion pictures.

According to the Web site The Matt Helm Dossier, the first draft manuscript was completed by Hamilton in 2001. The same site reported that in 2002 the 86-year-old author was in the process of revising the manuscript. As of early 2015, however, there has been no announcement regarding this book's release; Hamilton died in November 2006. The last Matt Helm volume published to date was The Damagers in 1993.

Documents and drafts related to The Dominators are reportedly part of an archive of Hamilton papers currently held by the University of California, Los Angeles Library.
