= Mad River =

Mad River may refer to:

== Places ==
=== Canada ===
- Mad River (British Columbia), a river of British Columbia
- Mad River (Ontario), a river of Ontario

=== United States ===
- Mad River (California)
- Mad River, California, a community in Trinity County, California
- Mad River (Connecticut), a river in New Haven County, Connecticut
- Mad River (Cold River), a tributary of the Cold River in Maine
- Mad River (Massachusetts), a river of Massachusetts
- Mad River (Cocheco River), a tributary of the Cocheco River in New Hampshire
- Mad River (Pemigewasset River), a tributary of the Pemigewasset River in New Hampshire
- Mad River (Ohio)
- Mad River Road, an overland route in Ohio
- Mad River (Vermont)
- Mad River Glen, a ski area in Vermont
- Mad River (Washington)

== Other uses ==
- Mad River (band), a rock band based in San Francisco, California during the 1960s
- Mad River (novel), a western novel by Donald Hamilton
- Mad River Brewing Company, a brewing company in California
- Mad River Local School District, in Riverside, Ohio, United States

== See also ==
- Erythropotamos, a river in Bulgaria and Greece known in Bulgarian as Luda reka ("Mad River")
- Mad River Township (disambiguation)
