= The Terrorizers =

1977 novel by Donald Hamilton

- 1977 paperback edition
- Author: Donald Hamilton
- Language: English
- Series: Matt Helm
- Genre: Spy novel
- Publisher: Fawcett Publications
- Publication date: 1977
- Publication place: United States
- Media type: Print (paperback)
- Pages: 190 pp
- ISBN: 0-449-13865-8
- Preceded by: The Retaliators
- Followed by: The Revengers

The Terrorizers is the eighteenth novel in the Matt Helm secret agent novel series by Donald Hamilton. It was first published in 1977. Following the publication of this book, Hamilton put his longtime character on hiatus; the next Matt Helm novel, The Revengers, would not be published until 1982.

This novel was nominated for an Edgar Award.

== Plot summary ==
Matt Helm finds himself in Canada suffering from amnesia, with only his instincts keeping him alive as the tries to regain his memory while stopping a terrorist organization.
