= The Detonators =

1985 novel by Donald Hamilton

- 1985 paperback edition
- Author: Donald Hamilton
- Language: English
- Series: Matt Helm
- Genre: Spy novel
- Publisher: Fawcett Publications
- Publication date: 1982
- Publication place: United States
- Media type: Print (Paperback)
- Pages: 345 pp
- ISBN: 0-449-12755-9
- OCLC: 12239560
- Preceded by: The Infiltrators
- Followed by: The Vanishers

The Detonators, published in 1985, is a novel in the long-running secret agent series Matt Helm by Donald Hamilton.

== Plot summary ==
Matt Helm is assigned to assassinate an expert in explosives who is planning to build his own atomic weapon.
