= The Annihilators (novel) =

Book by Donald Hamilton

- 1983 paperback edition
- Author: Donald Hamilton
- Language: English
- Series: Matt Helm
- Genre: Spy novel
- Publisher: Fawcett Publications
- Publication date: 1983
- Publication place: United States
- Media type: Print (paperback)
- Preceded by: The Revengers
- Followed by: The Infiltrators

The Annihilators, published in 1983, was the twentieth novel in the long-running secret agent series Matt Helm by Donald Hamilton.

== Plot summary ==
After the murder of a close friend, assassin Matt Helm finds himself back in the fictional country of Costa Verde (setting for the earlier novel, The Ambushers) and in the middle of a revolution.
