= Date with Darkness =

Novel by Donald Hamilton

- First edition
- Author: Donald Hamilton
- Language: English
- Genre: Spy
- Publisher: Rinehart
- Publication date: 1947
- Publication place: United States
- Media type: Print (hardcover)

Date with Darkness is a spy novel by Donald Hamilton, his first published novel.

== Plot summary ==
Navy Lieutenant Philip Branch is on leave in New York City when he becomes snared in a glamour girl's schemes.

== Publication history ==
- 1947, USA, Rinehart, hardcover
- 1950, USA, Dell, Mapback #375, paperback
- 1951, UK, Allan Wingate, hardcover
