= The Removers =

1961 novel by Donald Hamilton

- Paperback original
- Author: Donald Hamilton
- Language: English
- Series: Matt Helm
- Genre: Spy novel
- Publisher: Fawcett Publications
- Publication date: 1961
- Publication place: United States
- Media type: Print (Paperback)
- Preceded by: The Wrecking Crew (novel)
- Followed by: The Silencers

The Removers is a spy novel by Donald Hamilton first published in 1961. It was the third novel featuring Hamilton's creation, counter-agent and assassin Matt Helm.

== Plot summary ==
A year after having been reactivated, Helm receives a message from his ex-wife, asking for his aid, and soon finds himself fighting to protect his family from an enemy agent.
