= Loving (1970 film) =

1970 film by Irvin Kershner

- DVD cover
- Directed by: Irvin Kershner
- Screenplay by: Don Devlin
- Based on: Brooks Wilson Ltd. by J.M. Ryan
- Produced by: Don Devlin
- Starring: George Segal; Eva Marie Saint; Sterling Hayden; Keenan Wynn; Nancie Phillips
- Cinematography: Gordon Willis
- Edited by: Robert Lawrence
- Music by: Bernardo Segall
- Distributed by: Columbia Pictures
- Release date: March 4, 1970 (New York)
- Running time: 89 minutes
- Language: English

Loving is a 1970 American comedy-drama film released by Columbia Pictures and directed by Irvin Kershner. It is based on the novel Brooks Wilson Ltd. written by pulp magazine illustrator John McDermott under his pen name J.M. Ryan. The movie stars George Segal in the lead role of philandering illustrator Brooks Wilson and Eva Marie Saint as his wife Selma. The cast included Sterling Hayden, David Doyle, Keenan Wynn, Roy Scheider, and Sherry Lansing. Broadway actress Betsy von Furstenberg has a small uncredited role, one of only two motion pictures she ever appeared in.

== Plot ==
Brooks Wilson is a busy man, juggling his work as a commercial artist with a marriage to Selma, and two young daughters Lizzie and Hannah. He also has a girlfriend on the side, Grace, who wants him to commit to her, but he cannot do it.

Brooks is trying desperately to land an elusive account from Lepridon, but this is seeming harder to achieve than he thought. One evening, he and Selma attend a party at a grand Connecticut home. Feeling his life is falling apart, Brooks seduces flirty Nelly Parks, wife of his associate Will. They go to a children's playhouse outside the main house, and their indiscretions are caught on closed-circuit television. Selma and Will are devastated. Brooks and Will fall into a fist-fight. After the commotion dies down, the harried Brooks tells Selma that he finally landed the Lepridon account. She smacks him with her handbag, and they stare at each other in silence, seeing their marriage honestly for the first time.

== Cast ==
- George Segal as Brooks Wilson
- Eva Marie Saint as Selma Wilson
- Sterling Hayden as Mr. Lepridon
- Keenan Wynn as Edward
- Nancie Phillips as Nelly Parks
- Janis Young as Grace
- David Doyle as Will Parks
- Paul Sparer as Marve
- Andrew Duncan as Willy Wulfman
- Sherry Lansing as Susan
- Roland Winters as Tom "Plommie" Plommer
- Edgar Stehli as Mr. Kramm
- Calvin Holt as Danny
- Mina Kolb as Diane
- Diana Douglas as Mrs. Shavelson
- David Ford as Al
- James Manis as Charles
- Mart Hulswit as Ted
- John Fink as Brad
- William Duffy as Jay
- Irving Selbst as Benny
- Martin Harvey Friedberg as Roger
- Lorraine Cullen as Lizzie Wilson
- Cheryl Bucher as Hannah Wilson
- Ed Crowley as Mr. Shavelson
- Roy Scheider as Skip Geiser
- Sab Shimono as Byron
- Eileen O'Neill as Cindy
- Diane Davies as Barbie
- Betsy Von Furstenberg as Grace's aunt (uncredited)
- M. Emmet Walsh as waiter (uncredited)

== Production ==
The film was shot on location in New York and Westport, Connecticut.

== Release ==
The film opened March 4, 1970 at Cinema Rendezvous and Loew's Cine in New York City.

== Critical reception ==
The film has generally been well received by critics. Steven Scheuer found the film "quietly intense" and "humorous, human, and insightful", but found the film's final scene "incongruous in its farcical mayhem," (Scheuer, 1990: 641). On the other hand, Leonard Maltin found the film's climax "superb" and praised director Irvin Kershner on his "great feeling for day-to-day detail [of the characters' lives]" (Maltin, 1991: 730).

Roger Ebert found the film "an amusing and intelligent comedy of manners" (Ebert, 1970) with a great central performance by George Segal. Clive Hirschhorn noted that while the film was "well-observed", and was truly "Segal's film", it was still "uneven" in content (Hirschhorn, 1989: 285). Perhaps the review that most sums up the film comes from Leslie Halliwell, "smart New York sex comedy, typical of many but better than most," (Halliwell, 2000: 496).

== See also ==
- List of American films of 1970
