= The Revengers (novel) =

1982 novel by Donald Hamilton

- 1982 paperback edition
- Author: Donald Hamilton
- Language: English
- Series: Matt Helm
- Genre: Spy novel
- Publisher: Fawcett Publications
- Publication date: 1982
- Publication place: United States
- Media type: Print (paperback)
- ISBN: 0-449-13093-2
- Preceded by: The Terrorizers
- Followed by: The Annihilators

The Revengers, published in 1982, is a novel in the long-running secret agent series Matt Helm by Donald Hamilton. It was the first Helm book published since 1977 and the nineteenth book published overall since 1960.

This book was seen as a reintroduction of the character after a five-year hiatus, including multiple references to past missions and with a younger-looking depiction of the character on the book cover (his origins as a Second World War assassin being played down). Beginning with this novel the page count of Hamilton's novels was also noticeably greater and this remained in place for the remainder of the series.

== Plot summary ==
Someone is killing off Matt Helm's friends and past associates. Helm must stop the killing while protecting a journalist who plans to make Helm's secret organization public knowledge.
