= Iron Men and Silver Stars =

Collection of western short stories edited by Donald Hamilton

- Paperback original
- Editor: Donald Hamilton
- Cover artist: Stan Galli
- Language: English
- Genre: Western short stories
- Publisher: Fawcett Publications
- Publication date: 1967
- Publication place: United States
- Media type: Print (paperback)
- Pages: 192 pp

Iron Men and Silver Stars is a collection of western short stories edited by Donald Hamilton. Hamilton's short story contribution, The Guns of William Longley, won the 1967 Western Writers of America Spur Award for best short material.

== Contents ==
- Preface: The Great Tradition, Donald Hamilton, 7 (originally published in WWA newsletter The Roundup, April 1956)
- Green Wounds, Carter Travis Young, 11
- Epitaph, Tom W. Blackburn, 19
- In the Line of Duty, Elmer Kelton, 40
- Peace Officer, Brian Garfield, 57
- The Mayor of Strawberry Hill, Todhunter Ballard, 72
- Lawmen Stand Alone, Lin Searles, 87
- Coward's Canyon, John Prescott, 101
- The O'Keefe Luck, Wayne D. Overholser, 117
- The Hangman, Luke Short (writer), 127
- Lynch Mob at Cimmarron Crossing, Thomas Thompson, 165
- The Guns of William Longley, Donald Hamilton, 178 (first publication of this story)

== Publication history ==
- 1967, USA, Fawcett, Gold Medal d1821, paperback
