= Bengt Hamilton =

Swedish-American pediatrician and academic (1892–1979)

Bengt Leopold Knutsson Hamilton (March 21, 1892 in Uppsala, Sweden – July 15, 1979 in Santa Fe, NM, United States) was a pediatrician and professor of pediatrics at the University of Chicago.

== Professional life ==
Hamilton earned his medical degree/license in 1917 and then later earned his PhD in 1922. After several years of clinical training at Sachska Children's Hospital in Stockholm, he then moved to the United States and was employed as the Professor of Pediatric Medicine at Johns Hopkins University in Baltimore, Maryland. In 1930, he moved to Chicago where he managed a private practice and served as the Professor of Pediatrics at the University of Chicago. Hamilton was a prolific researcher and published several articles in respected journals on topics like "Hypothyroidism in Kidney Disease, " "Parathyroid Hormone in the Blood of Pregnant Women, " "The Changes in Total Calcium Content of the Bones During the Development of Rickets, " investigations of calcium and phosphorus turnover in preterm infants, constant differential growth ratio and much more. He also served in various officer positions during his professional life with the Chicago Pediatric Society.

== Personal life ==
Bengt was the son of the governor Hamilton Knut and Alice Abramson. He married in 1915 to Elise Neovius (1891-1988). Together they had four children, Donald Hamilton (1916-2006) (popular author of the Matt Helm mystery series); twin sisters Alice (born 1917), who married Professor Daniel Jones and Birgit (born 1917), who married Professor Victor Regener; and Margaret "Meg" (born 1920), who married Clark Sergel (who died in 1977) and Carl Baxter. Bengt spent his final years and retirement in Santa Fe, NM. An avid proponent of the arts, he was a talented and creative artist, creating paintings, charcoal sketches, essays, and even poetry.

== Hamilton Dynasty ==
Bengt Hamilton was a count and was a descendant of the Scottish Clan Hamilton, specifically the Swedish branch of the family that descended from Malcolm Hamilton of Monea (who died in 1629).
