= On Guns and Hunting =

Book by Donald Hamilton

- Paperback original
- Author: Donald Hamilton
- Language: English
- Genre: Outdoor literature
- Publisher: Fawcett Publications
- Publication date: 1970
- Publication place: United States
- Media type: Print (paperback)
- Pages: 208 pp

On Guns and Hunting is a collection of non-fiction outdoor literature and one short story by Donald Hamilton.

== Contents ==
- Inside on the Rail, 7 (Outdoor Life, Jan 1955)
- The World Was Full of Quail, 15 (Outdoor Life, May 1954)
- The Geese of Still Pond, 23
- What's the Big Mystery?, 31 (Outdoor Life, Jun 1955)
- Watch My Smoke, 40 (Outdoor Life, Jul 1956)
- Arctic Hunt, 50 (American Swedish Monthly, 1961)
- The Great Swedish Älg, 65 (American Swedish Monthly, 1961)
- The Mile Gun, 74 (Sports Afield, Sep 1958, short story)
- Cottontail Carnival, 91 (Gun World, 1969)
- Afghan, Farewell, 100
- Just Want a Deer?, 104 (Outdoor Life, Jun 1961)
- Pronghorns in the Pasture, 113 (Outdoor Life, Feb 1966)
- Family Hunt, 121
- Block That Kick!, 132 (Gun Digest 22nd Edition, 1968)
- Caliber Catastrophe, 144 (Gun World, Jun 1967)
- Test Patterns Are Necessary!, 154 (Guns Magazine, 1968)
- First-Year Retriever Man, 163 (True's Hunting Yearbook No. 20, 1969, as How to put the fetch in Fido)
- Who's Minding the Store?, 176
- King of the Canadian Canyon, 186
- Excuse me, I Love Guns, 196

== Publication history ==
- 1970, USA, Fawcett, Gold Medal T2299, paperback

== Critical reception ==
Alice Bullock of The New Mexican called it "a refreshingly candid look at why men and women spend days and dollars to seek out wild game for the table."
