= Hammerhead (novel) =

1964 novel

- 1968 Pan paperback
- Author: James Mayo
- Language: English
- Series: Charles Hood
- Genre: Spy thriller
- Publisher: Heinemann
- Publication date: 1964
- Publication place: United Kingdom
- Media type: Print
- Followed by: Let Sleeping Girls Lie

Hammerhead is a 1964 spy thriller novel written by James Mayo. It was the first in a series of five novels featuring the spy Charles Hood, working for British intelligence. Hood's cover is that of an art dealer, and in this case he is sent by MI6 to infiltrate the luxury yacht of a villain, moored off the French Riviera. Hood discovers a plot to kidnap a British official at a major NATO summit and steal top secret documents.

== Adaptation ==
In 1968 it was made into a film of the same title directed by David Miller and starring Vince Edwards as Hood, supported by Judy Geeson, Peter Vaughan and Diana Dors. It was distributed by Columbia Pictures.

== Bibliography ==
- Burton, Alan. Looking-Glass Wars: Spies on British Screens since 1960. Vernon Press, 2018.
- Burton, Alan Historical Dictionary of British Spy Fiction. Rowman & Littlefield, 2016.
- Clinton, Franz Anthony. British Thrillers, 1950-1979: 845 Films of Suspense, Mystery, Murder and Espionage. McFarland, 2020.
- Goble, Alan. The Complete Index to Literary Sources in Film. Walter de Gruyter, 1999.
