= Smoky Valley =

Novel by Donald Hamilton

- Paperback original
- Author: Donald Hamilton
- Cover artist: Verne Tossey
- Language: English
- Genre: Western
- Publisher: Dell
- Publication date: 1955
- Publication place: United States
- Media type: Print (paperback)

Smoky Valley is a western novel by Donald Hamilton.

== Plot summary ==
John Parrish does not run, even when the local land baron tries to burn him out of his home. The former soldier has to stay alive long enough to outwit his enemies.

== Film adaptation ==
Filmed as The Violent Men in 1955 starring Glenn Ford, Barbara Stanwyck, and Edward G. Robinson

== Publication history ==
- 1953, USA, Collier's, 12/11/1953, 12/25/1953, 1/8/1954, 1/22/1954, serial (literature)
- 1954, USA, Dell, Dell First Edition #18, paperback, reissued many times
- 1954, UK, Allan Wingate, as Rough Company, hardcover
- 1985, UK, Ulverscroft, ISBN 0-7089-1267-2, large print edition, hardcover
