= The Demolishers =

1987 novel by Donald Hamilton

- 1987 paperback edition
- Author: Donald Hamilton
- Language: English
- Series: Matt Helm
- Genre: Spy
- Publisher: Fawcett Publications
- Publication date: September 12, 1987
- Publication place: United States
- Media type: Print (paperback)
- ISBN: 0-449-13233-1
- OCLC: 16882198
- Preceded by: The Vanishers
- Followed by: The Frighteners

The Demolishers, published in 1987, is a novel in the long-running secret agent series Matt Helm by Donald Hamilton.

== Plot summary ==
After Matt Helm's son is killed by a terrorist bomb, Helm goes on a mission of revenge against those responsible.
