= John Larch =

American actor (1914–2005)

- Larch in Convoy, 1963
- Born: Harold Aronin; October 4, 1914; Salem, Massachusetts, U.S.
- Died: October 16, 2005 (aged 91); Los Angeles, California, U.S.
- Resting place: Mount Sinai Memorial Park
- Other name: Harry Larch
- Occupation: Actor
- Years active: 1953–1990
- Spouse: Vivi Janiss (m. 1955; died 1988)

John Larch (born Harold Aronin; October 4, 1914 – October 16, 2005; also credited Harry Larch) was an American radio, film, and television actor.

== Early life ==
John Larch was born Harold Aronin to Jewish parents in Salem, Massachusetts, in 1914. Nicknamed "Harry" in childhood, Larch was the younger of two children of Mitchell Aronin and Rose (née Larch) Aronin, both of whom immigrated to the United States from Russian-occupied areas of Poland prior to 1908. According to Massachusetts birth registries and federal census records, Mitchell supported his family as a "cutter" in shoemaking factories. By 1920, the Aronins had moved to New York City, where Mitchell continued to work as a shoe cutter.

== Military service ==
Larch served four years in the United States Army during World War II, an experience that left him troubled for years after his discharge. In a 1965 interview with The Berkshire Eagle, a newspaper in his home state, he shared his views on how military service had affected him personally, especially his difficulties in readjusting to civilian life:

What was my hangup then? Just about everything. I was looking for the four years I had lost in service. I was also looking for a rhyme or reason to the mass murders that took place. I was looking for the ideals I had once had. I was disgusted with the world — a world in which civilians acted as though there hadn't been a worldwide holocaust.

== Career ==
=== Film ===
After his lead role in the radio serial Captain Starr of Space during the broadcast season of 1953–1954, Larch began to perform increasingly in films. He was usually cast on the "big screen" in Westerns like How The West Was Won in 1962 and in other action films outside that genre, including Miracle of the White Stallions as General George S. Patton Jr. (1963), the television film Collision Course: Truman vs. MacArthur as General Omar Bradley (1976), and replacing James Gregory as Mac in the Matt Helm movie The Wrecking Crew (1969) starring Dean Martin, Sharon Tate, and Elke Sommer. Larch also appeared in two 1971 Clint Eastwood films, Dirty Harry and Play Misty for Me.

=== Television ===
Larch had the role of Captain Ben Foster on the NBC series Convoy (1965–1966). He guest-starred in Jefferson Drum; Johnny Ringo; Riverboat; Naked City (three episodes); Stoney Burke; Route 66 (three episodes); The Fugitive (two episodes); The Invaders; The Restless Gun (four episodes); Gunsmoke (seven episodes); The Virginian (four episodes, one of which was in 1970 as the Sheriff on The Men From Shiloh, which was the rebranded name that year for The Virginian); Bonanza; The Man From U.N.C.L.E.; Hawaii Five-0; Mission: Impossible (two episodes); The Troubleshooters; Bus Stop; The Law and Mr. Jones; Bat Masterson (season one, episode 30, which aired on 27 May 1959); The Rifleman; the final episode of the James Stewart legal drama Hawkins; The Feather and Father Gang; The Millionaire; three episodes of The Twilight Zone: "Perchance to Dream", "Dust", and "It's a Good Life", (S3 E8 1961) in which he played Bill Mumy's father with Mumy as a young boy; Rawhide, in the episode "Incident At Sugar Creek" (1962) as Sam Garrett; Vega$, in the season three episode "Deadly Blessing"; Dynasty (seven episodes); and Dallas (seven episodes). He also starred as hunter Sam in Daniel Boone in the episode, Chief Mingo. Appeared in Cannon (1973 TV series), Episode – To Ride A Tiger.

== Personal life ==
Larch married actress Vivi Janiss, the former wife of actor Bob Cummings. Larch and Janiss married in Los Angeles in March 1955. Janiss died in 1988. The couple had no children.

=== Joint acting appearances with Janiss ===
During their long acting careers, Larch and his wife performed together periodically on television. Larch, for example, appears with her in the 1968 episode "Yesterday Died and Tomorrow Won't Be Born" on the CBS weekly crime drama Hawaii Five-O starring Jack Lord. On earlier television series, they appear in the roles of Johnny and Elsie in the 1959 episode "End of an Era" on NBC's Western series Tales of Wells Fargo; as Isaiah and Rebecca Macabee in the 1960 episode "The Proud Earth" on the NBC anthology series Goodyear Theatre; as another married couple, Ben and Sarah Harness, in the 1960 episode "The Cathy Eckhart Story" on NBC's Wagon Train; and as John and Mary Clark in "No Fat Cops", the 1961 premiere episode of The New Breed starring Leslie Nielsen.

== Death ==
Larch continued to reside in Los Angeles, in Woodland Hills, until his death in 2005 at age 91. He is interred in a wall crypt at Mount Sinai Memorial Park in nearby Hollywood Hills.

== Partial filmography ==
- Bitter Creek (1954) – Hired Gunman
- This Is My Love (1954) – Police Detective (uncredited)
- Tight Spot (1955) – First Detective (uncredited)
- Seven Angry Men (1955) – Truce Flag-Bearing Sergeant (uncredited)
- 5 Against the House (1955) – Police Detective (uncredited)
- The Phenix City Story (1955) – Clem Wilson
- Gunsmoke (1955) – Clay
- The Naked Street (1955) – Police Desk Sergeant (uncredited)
- The McConnell Story (1955) – Cy (uncredited)
- Illegal (1955) – District Attorney's Man (uncredited)
- The Killer Is Loose (1956) – Otto Flanders
- Behind the High Wall (1956) – William Kiley
- Seven Men from Now (1956) – Payte Bodeen
- Written on the Wind (1956) – Roy Carter
- Man from Del Rio (1956) – Bill Dawson
- Gun for a Coward (1957) – Stringer
- The Careless Years (1957) – Sam Vernon
- Quantez (1957) – Heller
- Man in the Shadow (1957) – Ed Yates
- The Restless Gun (1957–1958) (4 episodes)
  - (Season 1 Episode 6: "The Shooting of Jett King") – Jett King
  - (Season 1 Episode 21: "Hornitas Town") – as Sheriff Ryker
  - (Season 1 Episode 29: "The Crisis at Easter Creek") – as Red-Eye Kirk
  - (Season 2 Episode 4: "Thunder Valley") – as Sheriff Anse Newton
- From Hell to Texas (1958) – Hal Carmody
- The Saga of Hemp Brown (1958) – Jed Givens
- The Walter Winchell File (1958) (4 episodes)
  - (Season 2 Episode 1: "Portrait of A Cop: File #27") – Lieutenant Michaels
  - (Season 2 Episode 3: "Too Many Clues") – Lieutenant Michaels
  - (Season 2 Episode 4: "Exclusive Story: File #31") – Lieutenant Michaels
  - (Season 2 Episode 5: "A Short Run to Broadway") – Lieutenant Michaels
- Bat Masterson (1959) (Season 1 Episode 30: "The Secret is Death") – Garrickson
- Bonanza (1959) (Season 1 Episode 3: "The Newcomers") – Blake McCall
- Hell to Eternity (1960) – Captain Schwabe
- Gunsmoke (1955–1961) (7 episodes)
  - (Season 1 Episode 7: "Smoking Out the Nolans") (1955) – Clay Young
  - (Season 3 Episode 11: "Fingered") (1957) – Jim Cobbett
  - (Season 4 Episode 37: "The Constable") (1959) – Rance
  - (Season 5 Episode 10: "The Boots") (1959) – Zeno
  - (Season 5 Episode 25: "Jailbait Janet") (1960) – Dan
  - (Season 6 Episode 32: "Long Hours, Short Pay") (1961) – Serpa
  - (Season 7 Episode 5: "All That") (1961) – Shanks
- The Twilight Zone (1959–1961) (3 episodes)
  - (Season 1 Episode 9: "Perchance to Dream") – Dr. Eliot Rathmann
  - (Season 2 Episode 12: "Dust") – Sheriff Koch
  - (Season 3 Episode 8: 'It's a Good Life") – Mr. Fremont
- The Rifleman (1961) (Season 3 Episode 15: "Six Years and a Day") – Jack Cooke
- Alfred Hitchcock Presents (1962) (Season 7 Episode 15: "The Door Without a Key") – Sergeant Shaw
- How the West Was Won (1962) – Grimes (uncredited)
- Miracle of the White Stallions (1963) – General George S. Patton, Jr.
- The Wrecking Crew (1969) – MacDonald
- The Great Bank Robbery (1969) – Sheriff of Friendly
- Hail, Hero! (1969) – Mr. Conklin
- Move (1970) – Mounted Patrolman
- Cannon for Cordoba (1970) – Warner
- Play Misty for Me (1971) – Sergeant McCallum
- Dirty Harry (1971) – Chief
- Women in Chains (1972) – Barney
- Santee (1973) – Banner
- Winter Kill (1974, TV Movie) – Dr. Bill Hammond
- Bad Ronald (1974, TV Movie) – Sergeant Lynch
- Framed (1975) – Bundy
- The Amityville Horror (1979) – Father Nuncio
- Little House on the Prairie (1980) "A New Beginning" – Arthur Mahoney
- Airplane II: The Sequel (1982) – Prosecuting Attorney
- Dallas (1985–1990) (7 episodes)
  - (Season 8 Episode 28: "Deeds and Misdeeds") (1985) – Wally Windham
  - (Season 8 Episode 29: "Deliverance") (1985) – Wally Windham
  - (Season 13 Episode 18: "The Crucible") (1990) – Arlen Ward / Atticus Ward
  - (Season 13 Episode 19: "Dear Hearts and Gentle People") (1990) – Arlen Ward
  - (Season 13 Episode 20: "Paradise Lost") (1990) – Arlen Ward
  - (Season 13 Episode 21: "Will Power") (1990) – Arlen Ward
  - (Season 13 Episode 22: "The Smiling Cobra") (1990) – Atticus Ward
