= Murder Twice Told =

Book by Donald Hamilton

- First edition
- Author: Donald Hamilton
- Language: English
- Genre: Thriller
- Publisher: Rinehart & Company
- Publication date: 1950
- Publication place: United States
- Media type: Print (hardcover)
- Pages: 250 pp

Murder Twice Told is a collection of two short thrillers by Donald Hamilton.

== Contents ==
- Deadfall, (1949)
- The Black Cross, (1947)

== Television adaptation ==
Deadfall was adapted for Suspense and broadcast on 12 January 1951.

== Publication history ==
- 1947, United States, The Black Cross, The American Magazine, Sep 1947
- 1949, United States, Deadfall, Collier's, 9/3/1949, 9/10/1949, 9/17/1949, serial (literature)
- 1950, United States, Rinehart, hardcover
- 1950, United States, Walter J. Black, Detective Book Club edition, hardcover
- 1952, United States, Dell, Mapback #577, paperback
- 1952, UK, Allan Wingate, hardcover
- 1966, United States, Fawcett, Gold Medal d1623, paperback
