= Night Walker =

Novel by Donald Hamilton

- Paperback original
- Author: Donald Hamilton
- Cover artist: Carl Bobertz
- Language: English
- Genre: Spy
- Publisher: Dell
- Publication date: 1954
- Publication place: United States
- Media type: Print (paperback)

Night Walker is a 1954 spy novel by Donald Hamilton. It was first serialized in Collier's Magazine in 1951 as Mask for Danger.

== Plot summary ==
Navy Lt. David Young hitches a ride with a friendly stranger and wakes up in a hospital bed with a new name and a pretty young wife.

== Publication history ==
- 1951, US, Collier's, as "Mask For Danger", 6/16/1951, 6/23/1951, 6/30/1951, 7/7/1951, 7/14/1951, serial (literature)
- 1954, US, Dell, Dell First Edition #27, paperback
- 1964, US, Fawcett Publications, Gold Medal k1472, paperback, reprinted several times
- 2006, US, Hard Case Crime #16, ISBN 0-8439-5586-4, paperback
