= The Intimidators =

1974 novel by Donald Hamilton

- US edition
- Author: Donald Hamilton
- Language: English
- Series: Matt Helm
- Genre: Spy novel
- Publisher: Fawcett Publications
- Publication date: 1974
- Publication place: United States
- Media type: Print (Paperback)
- Pages: 287 pp
- ISBN: 0449128423
- Preceded by: The Intriguers
- Followed by: The Terminators

The Intimidators was the fifteenth novel in the Matt Helm secret agent novel series by Donald Hamilton. It was first published in 1974.

== Plot summary ==
Despite the internal politics of The Intriguers, Matt Helm (code name Eric) still finds himself with plenty of work to do for his boss, Mac. This time he has a two-part mission: kill an enemy agent and then investigate the disappearances of a number of jet-setters within the Bermuda Triangle.
