= The Terminators (novel) =

1975 novel by Donald Hamilton

- First paperback edition, April 1975
- Author: Donald Hamilton
- Language: English
- Series: Matt Helm
- Genre: Spy novel
- Publisher: Fawcett Publications
- Publication date: April 1975
- Publication place: United States
- Media type: Print (Paperback)
- ISBN: 0-449-13214-5
- Preceded by: The Intimidators
- Followed by: The Retaliators

The Terminators by Donald Hamilton is a spy novel first published in April 1975. It was the sixteenth episode in the Matt Helm series and was the first of the Helm books to portray him, on its cover, as a long-haired, side-burned citizen of the 1970s. This image was subsequently used for reprinted editions of a number of the earlier stories.

== Plot summary ==
A longtime friend of Mac, Helm's boss, blames Big Oil for his wife's death aboard their modest yacht; in retaliation, he wants Helm's secretive, and murderous, agency to make trouble for an international oil company. Mac assigns Helm to get to the bottom of this request — and to "take care of" his friend.
