= The Threateners =

1992 novel by Donald Hamilton

- 1992 paperback edition
- Author: Donald Hamilton
- Language: English
- Series: Matt Helm
- Genre: Spy
- Publisher: Fawcett Publications
- Publication date: July 1992
- Publication place: United States
- Media type: Print (paperback)
- ISBN: 0-449-14681-2
- OCLC: 26432920
- Preceded by: The Frighteners
- Followed by: The Damagers

The Threateners is a spy novel by Donald Hamilton first published in 1992. It is the twenty-sixth installment of the Matt Helm series, and saw the return of the main character after a three-year hiatus.

== Plot summary ==
Matt Helm (code name: Eric) is assigned to kill a drug lord after the villain orders the murder of a journalist. The story starts in Santa Fe where Matt is trying to live a normal life with Jo Beckman from the previous novel, The Frighteners. At the beginning of the story, Jo has left Matt because he has taken up shooting as a hobby. One of the characters from a previous novel, The Infiltrators, Madeleine Ellershaw, comes to visit Matt with a complaint that he's having her followed. Matt too suspects he is being followed.

Madeleine dies violently shortly after. Matt's new friend Mark, who introduced Matt to shooting, also dies. Matt soon discovers that Mark was an author hunted by a South American drug lord for writing a book about the drug business, and that there was a price of one million dollars on his head.

After Mark's death, Matt unwillingly teams up with his widow to find back up copies of Mark's book. Found out, Matt is captured and tortured. Matt fights back against his captors and after fighting out of captivity manages to kill his target and complete his mission.
