= Matt Helm (TV series) =

American mystery television series

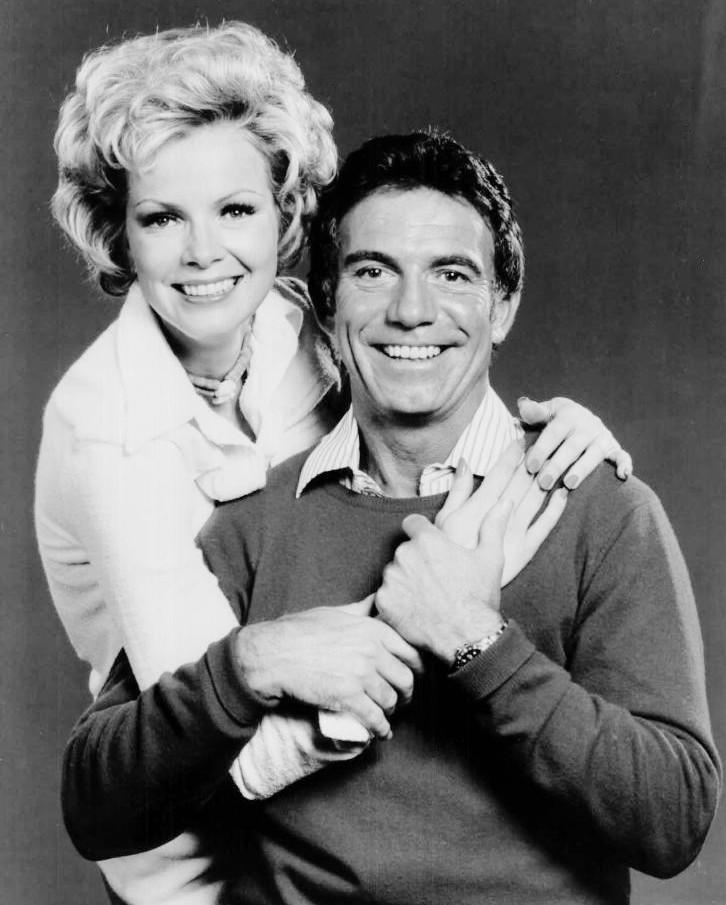
- Franciosa as Matt Helm and Laraine Stephens as Claire Kronski.
- Based on: Death of a Citizen by Donald Hamilton
- Developed by: Sam Rolfe
- Starring: Anthony Franciosa
- Composers: Jerry Fielding (pilot); Morton Stevens ("Dead Men Talk" and series' theme); Jerrold Immel; Richard Shores; Richard Hazard; John Parker
- Country of origin: United States
- Original language: English
- No. of seasons: 1
- No. of episodes: 13

Production
- Running time: 60 minutes
- Production companies: Meadway Productions; Columbia Pictures Television

Original release
- Network: ABC
- Release: September 20, 1975 – January 3, 1976

Matt Helm is an American mystery television series which aired on ABC from September 20, 1975, to January 3, 1976. The title character was played by Anthony Franciosa.

== Overview ==
The series was loosely based upon the literary character Matt Helm, who had been created and introduced by Donald Hamilton in his 1960 novel, Death of a Citizen; he had also been played by Dean Martin in a series of spy comedy films in the late 1960s. This series resembled neither the books—in which Helm was a terse assassin for a secret government agency—nor the films—in which Helm was a womanizing, wisecracking secret agent. The TV series was not related to the movies in any manner.

The series sees Matt Helm, a retired spy, opening a private detective business. Thus, most of the plot lines were standard detective stories of the day, such as one episode in which Helm investigates the disappearance of a race horse. Laraine Stephens co-starred as Claire Kronski, Helm's assistant.

A pilot TV movie aired on May 7, 1975, previewing the series already on the announced fall schedule and debuted on September 20 of the same year. Ratings were not strong enough for the series to continue past its initial 13 episodes, and the final episode aired on January 3, 1976.

Many notable guest stars appeared on the series during its short run, including Lynda Carter, who appeared in the penultimate episode, "Panic", playing a singer. Her appearance coincided with her rise to fame as Wonder Woman.

Other guests included: Jack Cassidy, Gretchen Corbett, Bert Convy, Pat Crowley, Susan Dey, Howard Duff, Shelley Fabares, Farley Granger, Sherry Jackson, L.Q. Jones, Patrick Macnee, Juliet Mills, Ian McShane, Ann Turkel and John Vernon.

To date, the Matt Helm TV series marks the most recent attempt to adapt Donald Hamilton's creation, although there were reports in 2006 that a film studio had optioned the rights to the character.

== Cast ==
- Anthony Franciosa .... Matt Helm
- Laraine Stephens .... Claire Kronski
- Jeff Donnell .... Ethel
- Gene Evans .... Sgt. Fred Hanrahan
- Peter Brown .... Cassidy (2 episodes)
- Eileen Chesis .... Joan (2 episodes)

== Episodes ==
No.	Title	Directed by	Written by	Original release date
1	"Matt Helm"	Buzz Kulik	Sam Rolfe	May 7, 1975
TV-movie pilot: A former secret agent for the Machine and the G.I.A, now a private investigator, is hired to protect a beautiful film star and gets involved with gun runners. Ann Turkel, Catherine Bach, Patrick Macnee; Gene Evans as Sgt. Fred Hanrahan.
2	"Dead Men Talk"	Richard Benedict	Michael Fisher	September 20, 1975
Helm sets out to find an air freight company executive who disappeared after deciding to terminate his involvement with a drug-smuggling ring. Peter Brown (as Cassidy); Richard Egan, Richard Mulligan, Katherine Justice.
3	"Now I Lay Me Down to Die"	Earl Bellamy	Gerry Day, Bethel Leslie	September 27, 1975
Helm is hired by a charming socialite with a dual personality to investigate a murder that she may have been committed while acting as her other self. Shelley Fabares, Ian McShane.
4	"Scavenger's Paradise"	Alex March	Gerry Day & Bethel Leslie	October 11, 1975
After the lawyer who was helping her find her natural parents is murdered, an adopted woman turns to Helm for help. Pamela Bellwood, Jason Evers.
5	"The Game of the Century"	Reza S. Badiyi	Unknown	October 18, 1975
Helm investigates the death of a tycoon who was going to be a player in the high-stakes poker game of all time. Patricia Crowley, Ray Danton, Betty Ann Carr.
6	"Murder on Ice"	Alex March	Don Balluck	October 25, 1975
Helm agrees to help an old friend find his business partners, unaware that they had been involved in diamond smuggling. Peter Brown (as Cassidy); Alex Cord, Richard Kelton, Jack Cassidy.
7	"Squeeze Play"	Robert Scheerer	Mann Rubin & James Schmerer	November 1, 1975
An ex-G.I.A. agent and friend of Helm's becomes a hit man's target. Marlyn Mason, Ahni Capri.
8	"Deadly Breed"	Bruce Bilson	Unknown	November 8, 1975
Helm investigates the kidnapping of a prized stud horse and the murders of the three men who had been watching the horse. Eileen Chesis (as Joan); Beth Brickell, L.Q. Jones, Gary Walberg.
9	"Death Rods"	Richard Benedict	Carey Wilber	November 15, 1975
Helm discovers a seriously wounded woman on the beach, only to find her gone when he returns with help. Juliet Mills, Joseph Campanella, Cesare Danova, Bert Convy.
10	"Double Jeopardy"	Lawrence Dobkin	Michael Fisher & Stanley Roberts	November 22, 1975
After clearing a businessman of murder charges, Helm discovers some new evidence that points to the man's guilt. Pippa Scott, Sherry Jackson, Don Gordon.
11	"Think Murder"	John Newland	Larry Alexander	December 6, 1975
Matt investigates the death of a research scientist who was found frozen to death after an apparent skiing accident. Carl, Betz, Joanna Barnes, Diana Ewing, Whit Bissel.
12	"Murder on the Run"	Seymour Robbie	James Schmerer	December 13, 1975
While searching for a woman who was involved with a $250,000 robbery, Helm finds himself being trailed by her cohorts who are hoping he will lead them to the loot. Gretchen Corbett, Tim O'Connor.
13	"Panic"	Don Weis	Martin Roth	December 27, 1975
Record pirates murder a detective friend of Helm's who had been hired to investigate possible piracy by a suspicious musician. Lynda Carter, Eric Braeden, Dane Clark, Roger Perry. Lynda Carter sings "Sunday Sunrise".
14	"Die Once, Die Twice"	John Newland	Ken Pettus & James Schmerer	January 3, 1976
The Director calls Helm out of the country for a G.I.A. mission. Kronski must uncover evidence to prove that her client did not murder her husband. She gets help from a private eye named Dan Mallory. Susan Dey, Hunt Hall, Howard Duff; Eileen Chesis (as Joan).
