= The Frighteners (novel) =

1989 novel by Donald Hamilton

- 1989 paperback edition
- Author: Donald Hamilton
- Language: English
- Series: Matt Helm
- Genre: Spy novel
- Publisher: Ballantine
- Publication date: June 1989
- Publication place: United States
- Media type: Print (Paperback)
- Pages: 314 pp (first edition, paperback)
- ISBN: 0-449-14521-2 (first edition, paperback)
- OCLC: 19765968
- Preceded by: The Demolishers
- Followed by: The Threateners

The Frighteners (not to be confused with the film of the same title) is a 1989 spy novel by Donald Hamilton, continuing the adventures of his creation, assassin Matt Helm. (The 1996 Frighteners movie is not based on this novel.)

Hamilton took a break from writing Matt Helm novels after this book; the next volume would not appear until 1992.

== Plot summary ==
Helm is assigned to impersonate a rich oil baron in order to track down a shipment of weapons before it can be used to overthrow the Mexican government.

Matt Helm starts by taking the place of an oil millionaire—one of the assignments where Mac is helping another agency by loaning out the services of his agent, Matt Helm. As usual, Mac is not doing this from purely altruistic purposes and gives Matt his usual warning - "Don't trust anyone" in the beginning of the novel. Head of the agency borrowing Matt Helm, a man called Somerset, wants Matt to go into Mexico and help trace a shipment of illegal arms, supposedly being smuggled to be supplied to Mexican revolutionaries by the said millionaire Horace Hosmer Cody.

In the beginning of the novel, Cody is arrested by Somerset's people and Helm takes his place with a make up job that he thinks will fool no one and it doesn't. Almost all of the story takes place in Mexico where Matt once again runs into his old ally Ramon Solana-Ruiz of the Mexican security.

The novel has much intrigue and is typical of Matt Helm style action. Most of the characters turn out to be different than from what they are portrayed at the beginning of the story and many of them go through transformation, including some of the dead characters. Matt, of course, succeeds in the mission completing all of the objectives, sometimes with help from others.
