= Mad River Township =

Mad River Township may refer to:

- Mad River Township, Champaign County, Ohio
- Mad River Township, Clark County, Ohio
- Mad River Township, Montgomery County, Ohio (defunct)

== See also ==
- Mad River (disambiguation)
