= The Intriguers =

1972 novel by Donald Hamilton

- US paperback edition
- Author: Donald Hamilton
- Language: English
- Series: Matt Helm
- Genre: Spy novel
- Publisher: Fawcett Publications
- Publication date: 1972
- Publication place: United States
- Media type: Print (Paperback)
- Pages: 208 pp
- ISBN: 0-449-13757-0
- Preceded by: The Poisoners
- Followed by: The Intimidators

The Intriguers, first published in 1972, was the fourteenth novel in the Matt Helm spy series by Donald Hamilton.

== Plot summary ==
This novel is a direct follow-up to The Poisoners. It is also the first book in the Matt Helm series to focus on Helm's superior, Mac, whose full name is revealed for the first time as Arthur McGillivray Borden. The storyline of this book is rather uncharacteristic because, instead of fighting terrorists and enemy names, Helm, known as Eric, and Mac work together to bring down unfriendly elements from within their own government, in particular a man who is threatening Mac's authority.

Fishing in the Gulf of California, Eric is shot at from an island. He races away, surprised at the power of the engine of his boat. Correctly calculating that his assailant had come in another boat from the same marina, he waits for the gunman to try to escape, swamps his boat, and tows it back to shore, leaving the gunman to drown.

At the marina, he is met by Martha Borden, Mac's daughter, who was sent by Mac with a message to call the office. Doing so, he deduces that bureaucratic infighting has resulted in Mac being poorly impersonated and the agency co-opted. Martha tells him she is supposed to accompany him to meet agent Lorna at the ranch near Phoenix.

Eric, Lorna, and Martha meet and discuss the other information that Martha has memorized to pass along: nine other agents, with contact numbers, a list of individuals to be "touched" and a date. Matt is to take his souped-up boat to meet Mac in Florida, stopping in Oklahoma to deal with a situation involving Carl, who will split the list of ten targets with Lorna. Carl is killing local law enforcement officers for personal, understandable reasons.

Eric and Martha arrive in Fort Adams, Oklahoma, and Eric contrives to prevent Carl from killing a third police officer, briefs him on the situation, and gives him his assignment. They continue on to Florida, and along the way, fall into bed together.

In Florida, Eric and Martha meet Congressman Hank Priest. a friend and shore neighbor of Mac's, who arranges for Eric to listen in on a private conversation that evening, at his home a short distance away.

Having observed how naive and idealistic Martha is, as she was distressed by having seen him leave his would-be assassin to drown in the Gulf of California, and his blunt assessment of Carl's actions and motives in Oklahoma, after arriving with her, by car, at the residence, he pretends to be rendered unconscious when she injects him with a hypo of plain water, not the. four-hour knockout drug she saw him use on the Oklahoma officer. He knows she thinks she has negotiated her father's safety in exchange for keeping Eric from interfering with the last part of the enemy plan.

Mac is hiding from the new leader of the federal intelligence service, a previous antagonist named Herbert Leonard who is in collusion with Senator Love, a woman who aspires to the presidency and is using Leonard to blackmail and kill those who stand in her way. Eric let Martha overhear Mac's location and steal the congressman's boat in order to gather the final clues he needs to follow her and take care of his targets.
