= Line of Fire (novel) =

Novel by Donald Hamilton

- Paperback original
- Author: Donald Hamilton
- Cover artist: Raymond Pease
- Language: English
- Genre: Thriller
- Publisher: Dell
- Publication date: 1955
- Publication place: United States
- Media type: Print (paperback)

Line of Fire is a thriller novel by Donald Hamilton.

== Plot summary and Evaluation ==
An assassination attempt carried out for a local crime boss by gun shop owner Paul Nyquist, is interrupted by a young woman. Among Hamilton's early works, it is easily as believable as Death of a Citizen, the origin of Hamilton's Helm series. Hamilton achieves here the difficult job of offering an Action-Adventure that requires no suspension of disbelief by the reader.

== Publication history ==
- 1955, USA, Dell, Dell First Edition #46, paperback
- 1956, UK, Allan Wingate, hardcover
- 1958, UK, Panther #768, paperback
- 1964, USA, Fawcett Publications, Gold Medal k1480, paperback, reprinted several times
- 1969, UK, Hodder Fawcett (publisher), Coronet Books, paperback
