= The Devastators (Hamilton novel) =

1965 novel by Donald Hamilton

- Paperback original
- Author: Donald Hamilton
- Language: English
- Series: Matt Helm
- Genre: Spy novel
- Publisher: Fawcett Publications
- Publication date: 1965
- Publication place: United States
- Media type: Print (paperback)
- Pages: 192 pp
- Preceded by: The Ravagers
- Followed by: The Betrayers

The Devastators is the ninth novel in the Matt Helm spy series by Donald Hamilton. It was first published in 1965.

== Plot summary ==
The story begins in Northern Scotland with the discovery of an agent who died from bubonic plague while trying to complete a mission. Matt Helm, code name "Eric", travels to London, England and eventually to Scotland in order to stop a mad scientist who plans to unleash a new Black Plague upon the world. Helm must navigate a dangerous environment, contending with a supposed ally who is actually a hostile Russian operative and a beautiful American agent who is supposed to be his temporary wife, Helm must navigate these complex relationships while also dealing with the environmental challenges of the Scottish Highlands, which feature single-track roads and rough terrain, to secure the scientist and prevent a global catastrophe
