= Murderers' Row (film) =

1966 film by Henry Levin

- film poster by Robert McGinnis
- Directed by: Henry Levin
- Screenplay by: Herbert Baker
- Based on: Murderers' Row; 1962 novel by Donald Hamilton
- Produced by: Irving Allen; Euan Lloyd
- Starring: Dean Martin; Ann-Margret; Karl Malden
- Cinematography: Sam Leavitt
- Edited by: Walter A. Thompson
- Music by: Lalo Schifrin
- Production company: Meadway-Claude Productions
- Distributed by: Columbia Pictures
- Release date: December 20, 1966
- Running time: 105 min
- Country: United States
- Language: English
- Box office: $6,240,000 (US/ Canada)

Murderers' Row is a 1966 American comedy spy-fi film starring Dean Martin as Matt Helm. It is the second of four films in the Matt Helm series, and is very loosely based upon the 1962 spy novel Murderers' Row by Donald Hamilton.

Ann-Margret and Karl Malden co-star in this sequel to The Silencers.

== Plot ==
The film begins with a shot of the United States Capitol being destroyed. It is actually a scale model being used in the demonstration of a heliobeam weapon in the headquarters of the Bureau of International Government and Order ("BIG O"). BIG O is a secret organization with the goal of world domination that previously appeared in The Silencers.

With the aid of a mole, BIG O conducts a worldwide assassination campaign against various secret agents working for ICE (Intelligence Counter Espionage). Matt Helm fakes his own death in preparation for investigating the scheme undetected.

Helm meets his boss, Mac, for a mission briefing. They watch a film showing Dr. Solaris enjoying himself with young women on the beaches of Cannes. Helm is to track down the now missing Dr. Solaris, who has developed the powerful "heliobeam" weapon, a device that uses the concentrated power of sunlight for mass destruction. Helm is told if he can not rescue Dr. Solaris he is to kill him, and if captured to kill himself, lest BIG O brainwash him. He is to work under the name of James A. Peters.

Posing as a Chicago gangster named Jim Peters, an alias of "Lash" Petroni, Helm travels to the French Riviera, flying into Nice Airport. A large customised Ford Thunderbird awaits him and he drives along the coast. He takes a package from the glove compartment containing a gun and a bottle of Ballantine's Irish whiskey. Trying to drink as he drives he finds the bottle holds a small tape recorder with a message from Mac instead of whiskey.

He goes to a discotheque where he meets Suzie, an attractive girl who dances with him, but is arrested by the police: being framed for a murder. At the police line up he is not picked out and he is freed.

He then goes to the harbour at Marseille where he is picked up by a mechanical grabber for a high-level discussion with Julian Wall. They leave in a hovercraft to reach Wall's island hideout. He is imprisoned but after escaping he beats Wall's henchman, Ironhead, and takes the hovercraft back to the mainland. He drives the hovercraft up the street to the disco where Suzie is wearing a booby-trapped brooch which is just about to explode. Helm rips it off her and throws it at the wall where it hits a poster of Frank Sinatra and explodes. Helm says "Sorry Frank".

Suzie and Helm are then pursued on the road in a car chase with Ironhead shooting at them. Ironhead's car goes over a cliff but Ironhead survives. They then take a speedboat back to Wall's island where another henchman, Dr Rogas, is torturing Solaris. However Suzie and Helm are both captured. Wall tortures Suzie until Solaris gives in, and tells the secret of getting his weapon to work. Meanwhile, Helm is put in a giant shaker machine to shake him to death. They escape and end up in a dockyard where Helm fights Ironhead until Suzie brings a giant magnetic crane over his head and picks him up.

The final scene shows the two rivals on two separate hovercraft and a duel between them. Wall picks up Helm's trick gun which has a ten-second delay and thereby shoots himself in his confusion.

They save Washington, D.C., from being destroyed.

== Cast ==
- Dean Martin as Matt Helm
- Ann-Margret as Suzie
- Karl Malden as Julian Wall
- Camilla Sparv as Coco Duquette
- James Gregory as MacDonald
- Beverly Adams as Lovey Kravezit
- Richard Eastham as Dr. Norman Solaris
- Tom Reese as Ironhead
- Duke Howard as Billy Orcutt
- Ted Hartley as Guard
- Marcel Hillaire as Police Capt. Deveraux
- Corinne Cole as Miss January
- Robert Terry as Dr. Rogas
- Dean Paul Martin as himself
- Desi Arnaz Jr. as himself
- Billy Hinsche as himself
- Frank Gerstle as Furnas

== Production ==
The film was the second of four produced by Albert R. Broccoli's former partner Irving Allen and Martin's Meadway-Claude Production company for Columbia Pictures in the mid-1960s starring Martin as secret agent Matt Helm. Euan Lloyd, a former Warwick Films publicity specialist and producer of The Poppy Is Also a Flower, assisted Allen in production chores.

Like its predecessor The Silencers, it took a much more light-hearted approach to the source material, treating it more as a gadget-laden spoof of James Bond films than Hamilton's original serious spy story. Unlike Hamilton's world weary professional, Martin plays Helm with his own persona, a fun-loving, wise-cracking alcoholic playboy.

Co-starring is Karl Malden as Dr. Julian Wall, whom New York Times film critic Bosley Crowther describes as a "Kansas type Dr. No". Malden had the idea that his character speaking in a different accent every time he spoke would be amusing.

Also in the film are Tom Reese as his Oddjob-type henchman named "Ironhead" and Beverly Adams returns as secretary Lovey Kravezit, as do the Slaygirls, a group of beautiful and dangerous women. Columbia starlet Camilla Sparv plays Malden's assistant Coco Duquette and Soon Tek-Oh makes a brief appearance as a Japanese agent killed in his bath.

The first script was by Oscar Saul, who had written The Silencers. Herbert Baker, who had received a screen credit after he wrote the final version of The Silencers script, was brought in to rewrite Saul's first draft of Murderers' Row and received sole credit. Baker had written several Martin and Lewis screenplays and was a writer for The Dean Martin Show.

Filming began 18 July 1966.

The film was originally intended to be shot totally on location, but Martin, who also co-produced the film, refused to go to Europe. Second unit teams shot sequences in Villefranche-sur-Mer, Monte Carlo and the Isle of Wight for the hovercraft and helicopter sequences instead. The then-new SR.N6 hovercraft appearing in the film's sea sequences (with the land chase through the streets of Juan-les-Pins and scenes with Martin using a studio mockup of the hovercraft interior and back projection) was provided by Hoverwork Hovercraft as their first assignment with a Cushioncraft CC5 appearing as well.

Henry Levin had previously directed the Dino De Laurentiis superspy film Kiss the Girls and Make Them Die for Columbia. He would also direct the following Matt Helm film, The Ambushers. The titles are again by Wayne Fitzgerald, and James Curtis Havens continued in the series as second unit director.

Like its predecessor, the film is full of jokes, bizarre secret weapons like a Hy Hunter Bolomauser modified AR-7 pistol configuration that only fires ten seconds after the trigger is pulled, plenty of beautiful women, and fashionable mod 1966 costumes by Moss Mabry. Karl Malden's character uses a Gyrojet spearfiring pistol and a volley gun type pistol. Helm kills a guard with a dart fired out of a cigarette; a weapon also used in You Only Live Twice. Martin's Helm drove a 1966 Ford Thunderbird landau.

== Reception ==
Released only ten months after The Silencers, Murderers' Row was the eleventh highest-grossing film of the year. The film received 1967 second place Laurel Awards for Best Action Drama and Best Action Performance for Martin.

Murderers' Row was followed by The Ambushers (1967) and The Wrecking Crew (1968). A fifth film, The Ravagers with Sharon Tate reprising her Wrecking Crew character and Dean Martin doing a dual role, was announced but never produced. Martin refused to make The Ravagers so Columbia reportedly held up Martin's share of the profits on Murderers' Row.

The 1960s Helm spoofs (as well as the two Derek Flint movies with James Coburn, the first of which came out the same year as the first Helm feature) seemed to become the template of the 1970s Bond films and in some cases Helm film set pieces were copied by the later Bonds. In Diamonds Are Forever, SPECTRE threatens the world with a heliobeam device from an orbiting satellite. The electromagnetic demise of Ironhead in the film happens to the giant "Jaws" villain in The Spy Who Loved Me, the hovercraft chase on sea and land reoccurs with a gadget-filled gondola in Moonraker with that film's evil mastermind Hugo Drax making jokes similar to Julian Wall.

== Soundtrack ==
The film score is by Lalo Schifrin, replacing Elmer Bernstein. In addition to the driving main theme and spy time score, Schifrin includes some jazz pieces, with one having a cover version by Bud Shank, as well as a song with lyrics by Howard Greenfield ("I'm Not the Marrying Kind") for Martin that, due to contractual rights, didn't appear on the soundtrack album. It did, however, appear on Martin's LP, Happiness is Dean Martin.

Billy Strange slightly changed Schifrin's main title to be an "original" composition entitled "Spanish Spy" on his James Bond Double Feature album.

The pop group Dino, Desi & Billy (which featured Martin's son, Dean Paul Martin, who calls Helm "Dad" in the film) makes an appearance and sings the Boyce & Hart song, "If You're Thinkin' What I'm Thinkin'".
