= The Infiltrators =

1984 novel by Donald Hamilton

- First edition cover
- Author: Donald Hamilton
- Language: English
- Series: Matt Helm
- Genre: Spy novel
- Publisher: Fawcett Publications
- Publication date: 1984
- Publication place: United States
- Media type: Print (Paperback)
- Pages: 347 pp
- ISBN: 0-449-12517-3
- OCLC: 10774817
- Preceded by: The Annihilators
- Followed by: The Detonators

The Infiltrators was the twenty-first novel in the spy series Matt Helm by Donald Hamilton. It was first published in 1984.

== Plot summary ==
Assassin Matt Helm is assigned to protect a female spy newly released from prison, who may or may not hold the key to a conspiracy to overthrow the American government.
