= Assignment: Murder =

Novel by Donald Hamilton

- Paperback original
- Author: Donald Hamilton
- Cover artist: Victor Kalin
- Language: English
- Genre: Thriller novel
- Publisher: Dell Publishing
- Publication date: 1956
- Publication place: United States
- Media type: Print (paperback)

Assignment: Murder is a thriller novel by Donald Hamilton.

== Plot summary ==
Dr. James Gregory, a scientist at a secret laboratory in New Mexico, becomes a hunter's prey and his estranged wife is kidnapped.

== Publication history ==
- 1956, US, Dell, Dell First Edition A123, paperback
- 1965, US, Fawcett Publications, as Assassins Have Starry Eyes, Gold Medal k1491, paperback
