= The Violent Men =

1955 film by Rudolph Maté

- Theatrical release poster
- Directed by: Rudolph Maté
- Screenplay by: Harry Kleiner
- Based on: Smoky Valley; 1955 novel by Donald Hamilton
- Produced by: Lewis J. Rachmil
- Starring: Glenn Ford; Barbara Stanwyck; Edward G. Robinson; Dianne Foster; Brian Keith; May Wynn; Warner Anderson
- Cinematography: W. Howard Greene; Burnett Guffey
- Edited by: Jerome Thoms
- Music by: Max Steiner
- Color process: Technicolor
- Production company: Columbia Pictures
- Distributed by: Columbia Pictures
- Release date: January 26, 1955 (New York City)
- Running time: 96 minutes
- Country: United States
- Language: English
- Box office: $1,950,000 (US)

The Violent Men is a 1955 American CinemaScope Western film directed by Rudolph Maté and starring Glenn Ford, Barbara Stanwyck, Edward G. Robinson, Dianne Foster, Brian Keith, and May Wynn. Based on the 1955 novel Smoky Valley by Donald Hamilton, its storyline involves a ranch owner who comes into conflict with the land-grabbing tactics of the big local rancher, whose tense marriage threatens his family's stranglehold over the region.

== Plot ==
John Parrish, a former Union Army cavalry officer, has been living out west to facilitate his recovery from an old war wound on his lung. Known for foolishly not carrying a gun and avoiding trouble, now that he has a clean bill of health, he plans to sell his land to Anchor Ranch and move back east with his fiancée of three years, Caroline Vail. However, he is disturbed when he witnesses the town sheriff being gunned down by Wade Matlock, one of the cowardly henchmen working for the Anchor Ranch. Later, Anchor's crippled owner, Lew Wilkison, who has taken over the valley almost completely and who resents farm settlers moving in on the range, presents a low-ball offer for Parrish's ranch, telling him he has 24 hours to respond. After thinking about it, John decides to meekly sell out on account of his nagging fiancée's insistence. Then in a violent play to push the deal, one of Parrish's ranch hands, the son of a "nester" or local farm settler, is murdered by Wade Matlock.

Parrish's men ride into town for revenge, but he orders them back to his ranch and tells them that the new town sheriff, who works for Lew, is waiting to arrest them if they confront Wade. Then left alone, Parrish approaches Wade in the town saloon, surrounded by Lew's men. After meekly coming in, Parrish asks Wade to give himself up for the killing. As Wade begins to laugh, Parrish suddenly slaps his face and grabs his gun hand, while pulling his own gun and killing Wade after he fires his gun. Parrish quickly exits the saloon before Lew's men can react.

The next day, Parrish rides to the Anchor Ranch and tells Lew that his ranch is not for sale. Further, as he rides out, Parrish tells Lew, "Don't force me to fight, because you won't like my way of fighting." This riles everyone at the Anchor Ranch, except Judith, the disgruntled daughter of Lew and Martha. Not all is well at Anchor, with Martha carrying on with her husband's brother, Cole, who also has a Mexican girlfriend in town. Caroline Vail gives back her ring when Parrish refuses to sell.

Led by Cole, Lew's men burn down Parrish's ranch. Unbeknownst to Cole, Parrish expected this and his men and he are watching, which gives Parrish the justification to fight within the law. Using his military experience, his men and he ambush Cole and Lew's men, killing eight of them, and then taking to the hills.

Back at the Anchor Ranch, Cole and Lew argue and Cole decides to pull out, going into town to see his Mexican girlfriend. That evening, Parrish and his men cause Lew's horses and cattle to stampede, forcing all of Lew's men to leave the ranch to deal with the livestock. With the ranch unguarded, Parrish men set fire to the Anchor Ranch house. Still at the ranch, Lew and Martha are caught in the fire. Lew asks Martha for his crutches, and she throws them into the fire before running from the burning house, leaving him to die, but Lew survives.

Martha finds Cole and tells him that Lew is dead, and together, they can rebuild Anchor. The naïve Cole agrees to help Martha and assembles a small army of men, with help from the sheriff, who also believes that Lew is dead. They begin burning out and killing the nesters as likely allies of Parrish's and as an excuse to clear the valley. Back at the ranch, Judith finds Lew, who has crawled from the burning house and is hurt, but far from dead. Judith takes Lew to the hills, where Parrish and his men are hiding.

Cole and Martha return to the Anchor Ranch with the army of men, but are confronted by Parrish and Lew, who ride in with Judith. All three have come to realize Martha is the real villain. The sheriff is shocked to see Lew alive, who then orders the small army to leave his property. Parrish, seeing Cole in the distance, rides toward him and dismounts for a final showdown. Martha smiles, expecting Cole to kill Parrish. They approach one another and start shooting. Cole is shot in the chest and falls to the ground, dead. Martha runs to him, and as she kneels down, she sees Lew and Judith approaching her. In a panic, she runs from the ranch, only to be gunned down by Cole's Mexican girlfriend out for revenge.

Later in town, John Parrish and his men are loading supplies on their wagon, when Judith approaches and tells John that her father would like him to run Anchor. John tells Judith he has his own ranch to rebuild and rides off. Then stopping, he returns to her and smiling, he tells her, "Your father once told me he'd get my ranch one way or another." John and Judith ride off together as two old hands watching shake their heads admiringly.

== Cast ==
- Glenn Ford as John Parrish
- Barbara Stanwyck as Martha Wilkison
- Edward G. Robinson as Lew Wilkison
- Dianne Foster as Judith Wilkison
- Brian Keith as Cole Wilkison
- May Wynn as Caroline Vail
- Warner Anderson as Jim McCloud
- Basil Ruysdael as Tex Hinkleman
- Lita Milan as Elena
- Richard Jaeckel as Wade Matlock
- James Westerfield as Sheriff Magruder
- Jack Kelly as DeRosa
- Willis Bouchey as Sheriff Martin Kenner
- Harry Shannon as Purdue
- Frank Ferguson as Mahoney (uncredited)
- Raymond Greenleaf as Doctor Cromwell (uncredited)
- William Phipps as Bud Hinkleman (uncredited)

== Release ==
The Violent Men was released in theatres on 26 January 1955 and on DVD on 5 April 2005.

== Reception ==
=== Critical response ===
Film critic Bosley Crowther of The New York Times wrote:

COLUMBIA has pulled all the levers in making The Violent Men, a broad-beamed and action-crammed Western that opened yesterday at Loew's State. It has ticked off a well-machined scenario, a three-starred "big name" cast, and a scenic outdoor production that looks mighty grand in CinemaScope. If, at the end, it leaves you feeling you've seen just another horse-opera – another run-through of squatters battling rangers—it's no wonder, for that's what it is.

TV Guide wrote: "Barbara Stanwyck, Edward G. Robinson, Glenn Ford, and Brian Keith star in THE VIOLENT MEN, a better-than-average psychological Western featuring impressive CinemaScope] photography and some hard-charging action scenes."

== See also ==
- List of American films of 1955
