= The Man from Santa Clara =

Novel by Donald Hamilton

The Man From Santa Clara
- Paperback original
- Author: Donald Hamilton
- Cover artist: Ronnie Lesser
- Language: English
- Genre: Western novel
- Publisher: Dell Publishing
- Publication date: 1960
- Publication place: United States
- Media type: Print (paperback)

The Man From Santa Clara is a western novel by Donald Hamilton, first published in 1960 by Dell Publishing. In 1971, it was re-released as The Two-Shoot Gun by Fawcett Publications.

== Plot summary ==
Photographer Alexander Burdick drives his old mule-drawn army ambulance and a smooth-bore shotgun to the New Mexico Territory and into a range war.

== Publication history ==
- 1960, US, Dell, Dell First Edition B170, paperback
- 1971, US, Fawcett Publications, as The Two-Shoot Gun, Gold Medal R2492, paperback, reissued several times
