= Hammerhead (film) =

1968 British spy thriller film by David Miller

- Original film poster
- Directed by: David Miller
- Written by: John Briley (adaptation); Herbert Baker; William Bast (screenplay)
- Based on: Hammerhead by James Mayo
- Produced by: Irving Allen
- Starring: Vince Edwards; Judy Geeson; Peter Vaughan
- Cinematography: Wilkie Cooper; Kenneth Talbot
- Edited by: Geoffrey Foot
- Music by: David Whitaker
- Production company: Irving Allen Productions
- Distributed by: Columbia Pictures
- Release date: April 1968
- Running time: 99 minutes
- Country: United Kingdom
- Language: English

Hammerhead is a 1968 British Eurospy thriller film directed by David Miller and starring Vince Edwards, Judy Geeson and Diana Dors. Its plot concerns a criminal mastermind who attempts to steal NATO secrets, with an American agent hot on his trail. It is based on the 1964 novel of the same title by English novelist James Mayo, and produced by Irving Allen and written by Herbert Baker, who made the Matt Helm films for Columbia Pictures. It was filmed in London and Portugal.

== Synopsis ==
British intelligence asks a soldier of fortune, Charles Hood, to go to Portugal and help stop an international criminal mastermind called Hammerhead, who plans to steal a secret report on nuclear defence.

Hood manages to board the yacht owned by Hammerhead, a collector of valuable erotic art. He is distracted along the way by model Sue Trenton and a pair of Hammerhead's mistresses, Ivory and Kit.

Hammerhead intends to kidnap Britain's NATO delegate, Sir Richard Calvert, and replace him with a lookalike, Andreas, a master of disguise. He finds out Hood's identity and traps Sue and him inside a coffin, but they manage to escape. Kit and Andreas both are killed, while Ivory does away with Hammerhead personally, using a harpoon.

== Cast ==
- Vince Edwards as Charles Hood
- Judy Geeson as Sue Trenton
- Peter Vaughan as Hammerhead
- Diana Dors as Kit
- Michael Bates as Andreas / Sir Richard
- Beverly Adams as Ivory
- Patrick Cargill as Condor
- Patrick Holt as Huntzinger
- William Mervyn as Walter Perrin
- Douglas Wilmer as Pietro Vendriani
- Tracy Reed as Miss Hull
- Kenneth Cope as Motorcyclist
- Kathleen Byron as Lady Calvert
- Jack Woolgar as Tookey Tate
- Joseph Fürst as Count Ortega
- Andreas Malandrinos as Post Office Guard
- David Prowse as George
- Earl Younger as Brian
- Romo Gorrara as Marcel
- Maggie Wright as Roselle
- Veronica Carlson as Ulla
- Penny Brahms as Frieda
- Sarah Hardenburg as Kiki
- Otto Diamant as Joa
- Windsor Davies as Police Sergeant
- Arthur Gomez as Cafe Proprietor

== Production ==
The film was based on a novel by James Mayo published in 1964.

Film rights were bought by Irving Allen, the producer. Allen had, at one time, been in partnership with Albert Broccoli, who wanted to make movies based on the James Bond books; Allen did not, the partnership ended, and Broccoli had a huge success with the Bond movies. Allen moved into espionage films himself with the Matt Helm series, and he bought the film rights to Hammerhead. In 1967, Allen said: "at this stage I'm only interested in making money. I'm not interested in kudos or getting good reviews - I've had all that. I'm just concerned with getting the greatest number of people into theatres."

In May 1967, Allen said the project was on a slate of seven movies he had with Columbia, others being: Cromwell; The Black Frontier; The Wrecking Crew; Savage Canary; The Pocket Venus and The Ambushers. In June of the same year, Allen announced he had signed David Miller to a three-picture deal, starting with Hammerhead, which he would make in London, the following September, from a script by Jack Brierley and Herbert Baker; Allen wanted it to be the first in a series. After that month, Allen announced he had also signed Vince Edwards to a three-picture contract starting with Hammerhead. Edwards described his part as "like Humphrey Bogart in The Maltese Falcon".

The original plan was to film in France but this was changed to Portugal. That August, Allen announced Judy Geeson would co-star.

The production of the film was delayed because Columbia contract star Vince Edwards suffered a bone-fracture during the filming in Portugal in 1967.

Diana Dors had previously appeared in another spy movie, Danger Route.

== Reception ==
The Los Angeles Times called it "overfamiliar and mechanical, a jaded Bond".

The film was a box office disappointment and there was no sequel. Quentin Tarantino said he was a "big fan" of the movie, but disliked Vince Edwards' performance, even though he generally enjoyed Edwards as an actor. He felt Robert Culp would have been better casting.
