= Mad River (novel) =

Novel by Donald Hamilton

- Paperback original
- Author: Donald Hamilton
- Cover artist: George Gross
- Language: English
- Genre: Western novel
- Publisher: Dell
- Publication date: 1956
- Publication place: United States
- Media type: Print (Paperback)

Mad River is a western novel by Donald Hamilton.

== Plot summary ==
Boyd Cohoon comes back from prison for the girl; her brother, who'd done the crime; the mine owner who'd gotten rich; and the sheriff, his boyhood friend.

== Publication history ==
- 1956, US, Collier's, 1/6/1956, 1/20/1956, 2/3/1956, serial (literature).
- 1956, US, Dell, Dell First Edition #91, paperback. OCLC 38501218.
- 1957, UK, Allan Wingate, hardcover. OCLC 30222292.
- 1965, US, Fawcett Publications, Gold Medal k1500, paperback, reissued many times. OCLC 3369275.

== Bibliography ==
- Erisman, Fred (1976). "Western Motifs in the Thrillers of Donald Hamilton". Western American Literature. 10 (4): 283–292. doi:10.1353/wal.1976.0022. ISSN 1948-7142.
