= Texas Fever (novel) =

1960 novel by Donald Hamilton

- Paperback original
- Author: Donald Hamilton
- Language: English
- Genre: Western novel
- Publisher: Gold Medal Books
- Publication date: 1960
- Publication place: United States
- Media type: Print (Paperback)

Texas Fever is a western novel by American writer Donald Hamilton.

== Plot summary ==
Three years after the Civil War, the McAuliffe family drives a herd of cattle north from Texas to Kansas and into another kind of war.

== Publication history ==
- 1960, US, Fawcett Publications, Gold Medal #1035, paperback, reissued several times
- 1981, US, Walker, hardcover
