= Stephen Coulter =

British novelist and journalist (1914–1986)

Stephen Coulter (21 August 1914 – 16 July 1986) was a British novelist, journalist, and, as James Mayo, the author of several spy and adventure thrillers.

His series character Charles Hood, a James Bond clone, is an art-loving British spy. Coulter was also friends with Bond creator Ian Fleming. Both men had served in Royal Navy Intelligence during World War II, became reporters, Reuters correspondents and both eventually wrote for the Sunday Times. Coulter helped Fleming with background details in the first Bond novel, Casino Royale.

Two of his novels have been filmed, Hammerhead in 1967 and Embassy in 1972.

Coulter died on 16 July 1986, at the age of 71.

== Bibliography ==
=== Novels (as Stephen Coulter) ===
- The Loved Enemy [1952]
- Damned Shall be Desire: The Passionate Life of Guy De Maupassant [1958] published in the U.S. as "Damned Shall be Desire: The Loves of Guy De Maupassant "
- The Devil Inside: A Novel of Dostoevsky's Life [1960]
- Threshold [1964]
- Offshore! [1965]
- A Stranger Called the Blues [1968] Published in the U.S. as "Players in a Dark Game". U.K. paperback retitled "Death in the Sun".
- Embassy [1969]
- An Account to Render [1970]
- The Chateau [1974]
- The Soyuz Affair [1977]
- Blood-Tie [1988]

=== Novels (as James Mayo) ===
- The Quickness Of The Hand [1952]
- Rebound [1961]
- A Season of Nerves [1962]
- Asking For It [1971]

=== Charles Hood novels (as James Mayo) ===
- Hammerhead [1964]
- Let Sleeping Girls Lie [1965]
- Shamelady [1966]
- Once in a Lifetime [1968] published in the U.S. as "Sergeant Death"
- The Man Above Suspicion [1969]
