= The Retaliators (novel) =

1976 novel by Donald Hamilton

- 1976 paperback edition
- Author: Donald Hamilton
- Language: English
- Series: Matt Helm
- Genre: Spy fiction, Novel
- Publisher: Fawcett Publications
- Publication date: 1976
- Publication place: United States
- Media type: Print (Paperback)
- Pages: 221 pp
- ISBN: 0-449-12694-3
- Preceded by: The Terminators
- Followed by: The Terrorizers

The Retaliators was the seventeenth novel in the Matt Helm secret agent novel series by Donald Hamilton. It was first published in 1976. It was nominated for an Edgar Award in the paperback original category.

== Plot summary ==
One of Helm's fellow operatives is killed by U.S. agents during an assassination run against a Mexican general. Helm finds himself having to complete the mission while being pursued by men who are supposed to be on his side.
