= Murderers' Row (novel) =

1962 novel by Donald Hamilton

- Original 1962 paperback cover
- Author: Donald Hamilton
- Cover artist: John McDermott
- Language: English
- Series: Matt Helm
- Genre: Spy novel
- Publisher: Fawcett Publications
- Publication date: 1962
- Publication place: United States
- Media type: Print (Paperback)
- Preceded by: The Silencers
- Followed by: The Ambushers

Murderers' Row is a 1962 spy novel by Donald Hamilton. It is the fifth novel featuring his creation Matt Helm, a Second World War assassin recruited as a counter-agent by a secret American agency.

== Plot summary ==
Matt Helm, codenamed "Eric", is given a tough and distasteful assignment: to physically assault a fellow female agent in order to help establish her cover in an undercover operation. In doing so, however, Helm accidentally kills the woman, which results in him having to complete the woman's assignment; the assassination of an enemy agent.

He is meanwhile being pursued by his own agency, which is considering removing him from active service for his brutality. The location is near Chesapeake Bay.

== Film adaptation ==
Murderers' Row was adapted for the cinema in 1966 as a film of the same name. It was one of four films starring Dean Martin as Helm, and like the other three films the filmmakers chose to make the movie into an action comedy only very loosely based upon the novel (no incident such as Helm's accidental beating death of a female agent occurs in the movie).
