= The Ambushers (novel) =

1963 novel by Donald Hamilton

- Original 1963 paperback cover
- Author: Donald Hamilton
- Cover artist: John McDermott
- Language: English
- Series: Matt Helm
- Genre: Spy novel
- Publisher: Fawcett Publications
- Publication date: 1963
- Publication place: United States
- Media type: Print (paperback)
- Preceded by: Murderers' Row
- Followed by: The Shadowers

The Ambushers is a novel by Donald Hamilton first published in 1963, continuing the exploits of assassin Matt Helm.

== Plot introduction ==
Matt Helm conducts a by-the-book assassination in the (fictional) Central American nation of Costa Verde. Afterwards, he finds himself pursuing an ex-Nazi named von Sachs, who has obtained one of the nuclear missiles that had been bound for Cuba during the Cuban Missile Crisis, and who is threatening the United States with the weapon. Along the way he finds himself working with a Russian agent named Vadya (who would return in later Helm adventures).

== Film adaptation ==
The Ambushers was very loosely adapted for the cinema in 1967 as the third film in a series starring Dean Martin as Matt Helm. Like the other Martin films, The Ambushers took only a few elements of Hamilton's original story and recast the plot in the vein of an action comedy.
