= The Wrecking Crew (novel) =

1960 novel by Donald Hamilton

- The paperback version's original cover.
- Author: Donald Hamilton
- Language: English
- Series: Matt Helm
- Genre: Spy novel
- Publisher: Fawcett Publications
- Publication date: 1960
- Publication place: United States
- Media type: Print (paperback)
- Preceded by: Death of a Citizen
- Followed by: The Removers

The Wrecking Crew is a spy novel written by Donald Hamilton and first published in 1960. It was the second novel featuring Hamilton's ongoing protagonist, counter-agent and assassin Matt Helm. In this book Hamilton continued the hard-headed and gritty realism he had built up around Helm in the first novel of the series, Death of a Citizen.

== Film adaptation ==
The Wrecking Crew was loosely adapted in 1969 as a motion picture starring Dean Martin as Matt Helm. This was the fourth and final instalment in the commercially popular but critically derided film series, which took great liberties with Hamilton's original serious novels, turning them into campy comedies.

== Sequel ==
Hamilton's final published Matt Helm novel, The Damagers from 1993, is a sequel to this book, featuring the son of this novel's villain as its antagonist.
