= The Ambushers (film) =

1967 film by Henry Levin

- Theatrical release poster by Robert McGinnis
- Directed by: Henry Levin
- Screenplay by: Herbert Baker
- Based on: The Ambushers by Donald Hamilton
- Produced by: Irving Allen
- Starring: Dean Martin; Senta Berger; Janice Rule; James Gregory; Beverly Adams
- Cinematography: Edward Colman; Burnett Guffey
- Edited by: Harold F. Kress
- Music by: Hugo Montenegro
- Production company: Meadway-Claude Productions Company
- Distributed by: Columbia Pictures
- Release date: December 22, 1967 (United States)
- Running time: 102 minutes
- Country: United States
- Language: English
- Budget: $4 million
- Box office: $10 million (US/Canada)

The Ambushers is a 1967 American spy comedy film directed by Henry Levin starring Dean Martin as Matt Helm, along with Senta Berger and Janice Rule. It is the third of four films in the Matt Helm series, and is based on the 1963 novel of the same name by Donald Hamilton, as well as The Menacers (1968) that featured UFOs and a Mexican setting. When a government-built flying saucer is hijacked mid-flight by Jose Ortega, the exiled ruler for an outlaw nation, secret agent Matt Helm and the ship's former pilot Sheila Sommers are sent to recover it.

== Plot ==
Helm is sent to the ICE (Intelligence and Counter Espionage) Training Headquarters to uncover a traitor in the organisation. While there he meets ICE agent Sheila Sommers, a test pilot who has been recovered from a Central American jungle with no memory of what happened to the experimental flying saucer she flew. Due to the electro-magnetic power of the saucer, only a woman is able to fly it, as males of the species are killed by the energy.

Helm had worked with Sommers on an assignment where the two had posed as man and wife. When Sommers meets Helm, her memory comes back. Mac, the head of ICE, decides to send Helm and Sommers (posing again as his wife) undercover as a photographer doing a story on the Montezuma Beer Brewery, whose advertising jingle is the same tune as the anthem of Ortega's political movement.

Along the way, they must deal with Ortega's henchmen, Francesca Madeiros (an operative for Big O, Helm's main nemesis), who poses as a model and seduces Helm, an assassin named Nassim and a tough thug named Rocco.

Sparkler guns are the gimmick weapons used to levitate objects, weapons and people.

=== Themes ===
The film was the third of four produced in the late 1960s starring Martin as secret agent Matt Helm. It followed The Silencers and Murderers' Row and like those earlier films followed the approach of being a spoof of the James Bond film series rather than a straight adaptation of Hamilton's novel. It was followed by one more, The Wrecking Crew in 1969.

The Ambushers features a scene similar to one in the later James Bond film Live and Let Die (1973), in which one of the hero's love interests is stripped of her clothes by way of a magnetic gadget.

This film also boasts a very early onscreen appearance of a rudimentary powered exoskeleton to lift and throw heavy beer kegs.

== Cast ==
- Dean Martin as Matt Helm
- Senta Berger as Francesca Madeiros
- Janice Rule as Sheila Sommers
- James Gregory as MacDonald
- Albert Salmi as Jose Ortega
- Kurt Kasznar as Quintana
- Beverly Adams as Lovey Kravezit
- John Brascia as Rocco
- Linda Foster as Linda

== Production ==
The film was originally known as The Devastators. The budget could afford to hire Oleg Cassini to design the psychedelic mod fashions and take the cast out of the backlot for location shooting on Mexico seashore resorts.

Carey Loftin jumps a motorcycle across a train cutting in the climactic chase.

== Reception ==
This film is generally considered the weakest of the four Helm films, and is cited in the book The Fifty Worst Films of All Time by Harry and Michael Medved. The Medveds also cited a review of The Ambushers by critic Judith Crist which stated: "The sole distinction of this vomitous mess is that it just about reaches the nadir of witlessness, smirky sexiness and bad taste – and it's dull, dull, dull to boot."

=== Box office ===
The film earned theatrical rentals of $4.7 million in the United States and Canada from an estimated gross of $10 million.

== Soundtrack ==
Hugo Montenegro became the third composer in as many films to do the score for the series. He wrote (along with Herbert Baker who worked on Murderers' Row) the theme song, "The Ambushers", which featured the vocals of Boyce & Hart, two of the songwriters from Murderers' Row. Montenegro went on to compose the score solo for the next Matt Helm film, The Wrecking Crew.

For a musical in-joke the first few bars from Frank Sinatra's romantic hit Strangers in the Night are sampled as background mood music for Helm to neck with a young woman who did not swoon when listening to Martin's competing love song Everybody Loves Somebody.

== See also ==
- List of films featuring powered exoskeletons
