= John McDermott (American artist) =

American illustrator and writer

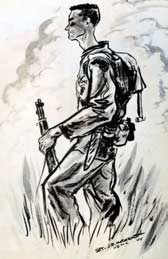
- Self-portrait on Okinawa during World War II
- Born: John Richard McDermott; August 30, 1919; Pueblo, Colorado
- Died: April 20, 1977 (aged 57); Westport, Connecticut
- Education: Self taught
- Known for: Illustration

John McDermott (August 30, 1919 – April 20, 1977), also known under the pen names J.M. Ryan and Mariner, was an American illustrator and author noted for action and adventure illustrations. McDermott worked as an in-between and effects animator for Walt Disney Studios and as a US Marine combat artist, before establishing himself as a cover illustrator for 1950s paperbacks and pulp magazines such as Argosy, American Weekly, and Outdoor Life. Under his J.M. Ryan pen name, he wrote the novels The Rat Factory (1971), a derogatory satire of Walt Disney and the Disney studio; Brooks Wilson Ltd (1967), on which the 1970 film Loving was based; and Mother's Day (1969) about Ma Barker. Under his own name, he novelized director-writer Bo Widerberg's screenplay for the 1971 film Joe Hill, which would be his final published book.

== Early life ==
John Richard McDermott was born 30 August 1919 in Pueblo, Colorado, the younger of two sons of Henry McDermott, an oil broker. McDermott was a young child when his father committed suicide. The family eventually moved to Los Angeles where McDermott's mother, Hazel, worked in a beauty parlor. He graduated from Hollywood High School in 1936. Although he had had no formal art education, he took a job as an artist at Walt Disney Animation Studios.

== Career ==
=== Disney ===
At Disney, McDermott worked as an in-betweener and effects animator on Brave Little Tailor, Pinocchio, The Reluctant Dragon and Fantasia. His experiences while working at Disney, particularly during the time of the 1941 Disney animators' strike, would later become the basis for his 1969 satirical novel The Rat Factory. McDermott left Disney to fight with US forces during World War II.

=== US Marines ===
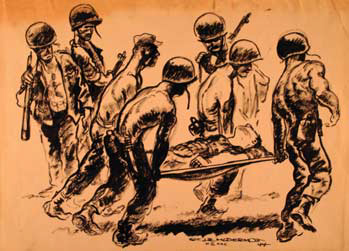
McDermott World War II sketch titled "Buddy is Wounded"

On September 29, 1942, McDermott enlisted with the US Marine Corps. He served as a "pistol and palette" combat artist assigned to the map-making section. As a sergeant with the III Amphibious Corps, McDermott was involved in battles in the South Pacific theater of war, documenting the Guam, Okinawa and the Guadalcanal Campaigns. McDermott considered his wartime years to be his art education.

"In the Marines, as a combat artist, I traveled with the troops and for three years got all the drawing opportunity anyone could want. My work changed enormously during this time and I’m sure it was due to constant drawing, every single day, from life, just putting down what I saw around me. In a few instances it was a dangerous kind of scholarship."

According to the Marine Corps history journal Fortitudine, McDermott was so prolific that his contemporary style pen-and-ink sketches became easily recognizable to both Marines, from published work in Leatherneck Magazine, and civilians, from glossy copies supplied by the Marine Corps to the nation's press. His wartime art appears in World War II history books and is displayed at the Pentagon and the National Museum of the Marine Corps.

=== Illustration ===
Following the end of World War II, McDermott moved from California to New York City to work as a freelance illustrator. McDermott made his reputation drawing modern action, war and adventure scenes. His work adorned the covers and inside story pages of popular pulp magazines of the 1950s such as Argosy, Adventure, Blue Book, Outdoor Life and American Weekly.

McDermott's illustrations appeared on numerous covers of 1950s paperback novels published by Dell, Fawcett Gold Medal, Bantam Mystery and others. His action graphics were geared toward thriller and detective genres, such as Donald Hamilton's Matt Helm books Murderers' Row and The Betrayers. He also created covers for science fiction comic titles such as Voyage to the Deep and horror-themed paperbacks such as the classic 1955 science fiction novel The Body Snatchers.

McDermott's professional signature was the initials "McD" written in small script.

=== Novels ===
In the late 1960s, McDermott wrote books under the pen name J.M. Ryan. The first, published in 1968 by Grosset & Dunlap, was the novel, Brooks Wilson Ltd. It revolved around the story of a commercial artist living in Westport, Connecticut who struggles to land a New York magazine illustrator account while juggling a failing marriage and a girlfriend. The book was adapted into the 1970 film Loving starring George Segal and Eva Marie Saint. McDermott disapproved of changes made in the screenplay.

He published Mothers Day in 1969, a stylized tale based on the life of Ma Barker and her gang. In 1971, McDermott wrote The Rat Factory, a thinly veiled satire against Walt Disney and the Disney Animation Studio. The story is about the struggles of a young animator in 1930s Hollywood drawing popular cartoons about Ricky Rat and Dizzy Duck under the dictatorial thumb of Sampson Studios owner Wade Sampson. Cinema professor Tom Sito in his book Drawing the Line: the Untold Story of Animation Unions from Bosko to Bart Simpson, said McDermott "illustrated, if not exaggerated, the psychological atmosphere in his controversial 1971 novel."

McDermott also wrote a novelization of the Bo Widerberg film Joe Hill which had won the Jury Prize at the 1971 Cannes Film Festival. Widerberg's script was based upon the true story of a Swedish-American labor organizer who defends himself during his 1915 murder trial.

=== Films ===
McDermott was an amateur filmmaker who enjoyed creating and filming reenactments of historical battles using his friends and family as cast and crew. Shot in 16mm, his movie Pickett's Charge caught the attention of the Public Broadcasting System which used it in an hour-long segment in its Odyssey television series. The film was later rebroadcast in 1958 on CBS with introductions by President Dwight D. Eisenhower and Field Marshal Bernard Montgomery. On the basis of that film, the Ford Foundation awarded McDermott a $10,000 grant to film a reenactment of the World War I battle of Belleau Wood. The only known copies of the films are housed in the Berkeley Art Museum Pacific Film Archive.

== Personal life ==
McDermott lived in Westport, Connecticut, with his wife, Ruth, with whom he had two daughters. He died on April 20, 1977.
