= Donald Hamilton =

American novelist and writer

- Born: Donald Bengtsson Hamilton; March 24, 1916; Uppsala, Sweden
- Died: November 20, 2006 (aged 90); Sweden
- Citizenship: Sweden, United States
- Occupations: Novelist, writer
- Writing career
- Language: English
- Genres: Spy fiction, non-fiction
- Notable work: Creator of Matt Helm

Donald Bengtsson Hamilton (March 24, 1916 – November 20, 2006) was a Swedish/American writer of novels, short stories, and non-fiction about the outdoors. His novels consist mostly of paperback originals, principally spy fiction, but also crime fiction and westerns, such as The Big Country. He is known best for his long-running Matt Helm series (1960–1993), which chronicles the adventures of an undercover counter-agent/assassin working for a secret American government agency. The noted critic Anthony Boucher wrote: "Donald Hamilton has brought to the spy novel the authentic hard realism of Dashiell Hammett; and his stories are as compelling, and probably as close to the sordid truth of espionage, as any now being told."

== Life ==
Hamilton was born on March 24, 1916, in Uppsala, Sweden, to Dr. Bengt Leopold Knutsson Hamilton and Elise Franzisca Hamilton (née Neovius). On September 27, 1924, he boarded the S/S Stockholm with his mother and three sisters at the Port of Gothenburg, Sweden; the ship arrived at the Port of New York on October 6, 1924. The family's destination was Boston, Massachusetts, where they joined his father, Doctor Hamilton.

Donald attended the University of Chicago (receiving a Bachelor of Science degree in 1938), and served in the United States Navy Reserve during World War II as a chemist with the rank of Lieutenant.

A long-time resident of Santa Fe, New Mexico, Hamilton was a skilled outdoorsman and hunter who wrote non-fiction articles for outdoor magazines and published a book-length collection of them. For a number of years after leaving Santa Fe he lived on his own yacht, then relocated to Sweden, where he lived until his death in 2006. A number of his Matt Helm novels are situated in the Santa Fe area and American Southwest in general; as Hamilton developed an interest in boating, many of the books began to have a nautical component as well.

Hamilton began his writing career in 1946, submitting pieces to fiction magazines like Collier's Weekly and The Saturday Evening Post. His first novel, Date With Darkness, was published in 1947; during the next 46 years he published a total of 38 novels. His first three books were published in hardcover by Rinehart. After World War II, American publishers began to experiment with issuing original paperback fiction. Most of his early novels — published between 1954 and 1960 — were typical paperback originals of the era: fast-paced tales in paperbacks with lurid covers, whether suspense, spy, or western. The most interesting of them is, arguably, Assignment: Murder, (alternate title: Assassins Have Starry Eyes), in which a mathematician working on the design for a nuclear bomb has to save his kidnapped wife from a group of shadowy villains. Two classic western movies, The Big Country and The Violent Men, were adapted from his western novels (The Big Country and Smoky Valley respectively.)

More substantial was the Matt Helm series, published by Gold Medal company, which began with Death of a Citizen in 1960 and comprised 27 books, ending in 1993 with The Damagers. Helm, a wartime agent for a secret agency that specialized in assassinating Nazis, is drawn back, after 15 years as a civilian, into a post-war world of espionage and assassination. He narrates his adventures in a brisk, matter-of-fact tone with occasional humor. He describes gunfights, knife fights, torture, and (off-stage) sexual conquests with a carefully maintained professional detachment, like a pathologist dictating an autopsy report or a police officer describing an investigation. During the course of the series, this detachment comes to define Helm's character. He is a professional doing a job; the job is killing people. Hamilton completed one more Matt Helm novel, The Dominators in 2002, that has not been published.

The noted "Golden Age" mystery writer John Dickson Carr began reviewing books for Ellery Queen's Mystery Magazine in 1969, and often praised thrillers of the time. According to Carr's biographer, "Carr found Donald Hamilton's Matt Helm to be 'my favorite secret agent,'" although Hamilton's books had little in common with Carr's. "The explanation may lie in Carr's comment that in espionage novels he preferred Matt Helm's Cloud cuckoo land. Carr never valued realism in fiction."

Hamilton died while sleeping on November 20, 2006. His papers are housed at the Charles E. Young Research Library at the University of California, Los Angeles.

== Personal life ==
He was married to Kathleen Hamilton (née Stick) from 1941 until her death in 1989. The couple had four children: Hugo, Elise, Gordon, and Victoria Hamilton.

== Works ==
Series Matt Helm

- 1960 Death of a Citizen
- 1960 The Wrecking Crew
- 1961 The Removers
- 1962 The Silencers
- 1962 Murderer's Row
- 1963 The Ambushers
- 1964 The Shadowers
- 1964 The Ravagers
- 1965 The Devastators
- 1966 The Betrayers
- 1968 The Menacers
- 1969 The Interlopers
- 1971 The Poisoners
- 1973 The Intriguers
- 1974 The Intimidators
- 1975 The Terminators
- 1976 The Retaliators
- 1977 The Terrorizers
- 1982 The Revengers
- 1983 The Annihilators
- 1984 The Infiltrators
- 1985 The Detonators
- 1986 The Vanishers
- 1987 The Demolishers
- 1989 The Frighteners
- 1992 The Threateners
- 1993 The Damagers
- 2002 The Dominators (unpublished)

Other crime novels

- 1947 Date with Darkness
- 1948 The Steel Mirror
- 1954 Night Walker
- 1955 Line of Fire
- 1956 Assignment: Murder / Assassins Have Starry Eyes
- 1980 The Mona Intercept

Short stories

- 1947 Murder Twice Told (features two stories: Deadfall and The Black Cross)

Westerns

- 1954 Smoky Valley
- 1956 Mad River
- 1958 The Big Country
- 1960 The Man From Santa Clara / The Two-Shoot Gun
- 1960 Texas Fever
- 1955 The Violent Men (movie adaption)

Non-fiction

- 1970 On Guns and Hunting
- 1980 Cruises with Kathleen

Editor

- 1967 Iron Men and Silver Stars

== Movie adaptations ==
The Violent Men, 1955; adaptation of Smoky Valley.

Five Steps to Danger, 1957; adaptation of The Steel Mirror.

The Big Country, 1958; adaptation of The Big Country (Hamilton novel).

General audiences may be more familiar with Matt Helm through a series of popular action-comedy movies produced during the late 1960s featuring Dean Martin in the title role. These farcical movies are based only slightly upon Hamilton's writings, which are much more realistic and grim.

- The Silencers, 1966
- Murderers' Row, 1966
- The Ambushers, 1967
- The Wrecking Crew, 1969

DreamWorks optioned the movie rights to Hamilton's books in 2002 and began planning a more serious adaptation of the Matt Helm novels, but the project is currently in abeyance.

== Sources ==
- John Dickson Carr, The Man Who Explained Miracles, by Douglas G. Greene, New York, 1995
- Encyclopedia of Mystery and Detection, by Chris Steinbrunner and Otto Penzler, New York, 1976, ISBN 0-07-061121-1
