= Death of a Citizen =

1960 novel by Donald Hamilton

- First US paperback edition
- Author: Donald Hamilton
- Language: English
- Series: Matt Helm
- Genre: Spy novel
- Publisher: Fawcett Publications
- Publication date: 1960
- Publication place: United States
- Media type: Print (Paperback)
- Preceded by: First book of series
- Followed by: The Wrecking Crew

Death of a Citizen is a 1960 spy novel by Donald Hamilton, and was the first in a long-running series of books featuring the adventures of assassin Matt Helm. The title refers to the metaphorical death of peaceful citizen and family man Matt Helm and the rebirth of the deadly and relentless assassin of World War II.

The book sees Matthew Helm, a one-time assassin and special agent for the American government during the war, being reactivated (code name: Eric) when a former colleague turns rogue and eventually kidnaps Helm's daughter. Afterwards, he agrees to return to duty as an assassin and counter-agent working for a secret agency run by "Mac," his superior officer from 13 years earlier (although published in 1960, the story itself takes place in 1958).

Death of a Citizen is notable for its grimness of tone and events as compared to the usual thriller of the late 1950s and early 1960s. After a few initial missteps as his "citizen" persona is shucked off, Helm re-becomes the competent, hard-boiled, and ruthless agent he had been earlier. The ending of the book is particularly shocking, perhaps, in that he shoots down an adversary who is not directly threatening him and then tortures and kills the person responsible for kidnapping his baby daughter. As a result of his actions, his daughter is rescued — but as the book ends his peace-loving wife is staring in horror at the bloody-handed monster that her apparently sedentary husband has become.

Hamilton would write a total of 27 Matt Helm novels between 1960 and 1993 (with a 28th volume as yet unpublished). The books maintain a loose continuity between each other, although later volumes would downplay Helm's Second World War connections in order to keep the character up-to-date. In the late 1960s, several motion pictures starring Dean Martin as Helm were produced; these films were produced as comedies and contained little of Hamilton's concepts. Death of a Citizen was one of the source novels for the film The Silencers, which was based upon one of the novel's early sequels. Death of a Citizen is one of only three Matt Helm novels not to use a noun as the title (i.e. The Silencers, The Ravagers, etc.), the others being Murderers' Row and The Wrecking Crew.
