= Matt Helm =

Fictional character created by author Donald Hamilton

- First appearance: Death of a Citizen
- Last appearance: The Damagers
- Created by: Donald Hamilton
- Portrayed by: Dean Martin

In-universe information
- Gender: Male
- Occupation: Spy, assassin
- Affiliation: United States government
- Nationality: American

Matt Helm is a fictional character created by American author Donald Hamilton (1916–2006). Helm is a U.S. government counter-agent, a man whose primary job is to kill or nullify enemy agents—not a spy or secret agent in the ordinary sense of the term as used in most spy thrillers.

Helm appeared in 27 adventure/suspense novels by Hamilton, first published in 1960, and the character was later adapted into film, television and other media. The 1960s film series, starring Dean Martin, featured a campy, humorous tone quite different from the gritty novels. The 1970s television series featured a more serious dramatic tone but was a relatively standard private investigator series with little connection to Hamilton's books.

== The character and the books ==
Published between 1960 and 1993, the 27 books in the series portrayed Helm, who acquired the code name "Eric" during his secret wartime assignments, as jaded, ruthless, pragmatic, and competent. The series was noted for its between-books continuity, which was somewhat rare for the genre at the time. In the later books, Helm's origins as a man of action in World War II disappeared and he became an apparently ageless character, a common fate of long-running fictional heroes.

The first book in the series, Death of a Citizen, takes place in the summer of 1958, 13 years after the end of the war. In the book, other characters describe Helm as verging on middle age and apparently soft and out of shape, although no specific age for him is given. In the next story, which apparently takes place in the summer of 1959, a hostile agent from a rival American spy organization taunts Helm as a shopworn 36-year-old and clearly over the hill as a physical specimen. Later in the book, Helm himself says that he is 36 years old. Writer Hayford Peirce examined the issue of Helm's age, and found this figure to be improbably young given the information about Helm's background in Death of a Citizen. Peirce postulated that Helm was actually several years older than the 36 years mentioned in The Wrecking Crew and that he was probably born around 1918. By The Betrayers, the tenth book, the age issue vanishes completely.

Critic Anthony Boucher wrote: "Donald Hamilton has brought to the spy novel the authentic hard realism of Dashiell Hammett; and his stories are as compelling, and probably as close to the sordid truth of espionage, as any now being told." Golden Age mystery writer John Dickson Carr, who began reviewing books for Ellery Queen's Mystery Magazine in 1969, "found Donald Hamilton's Matt Helm to be 'my favorite secret agent,'" wrote Carr's biographer, noting that Hamilton's books had little in common with Carr's. "The explanation may lie in Carr's comment that in espionage novels he preferred Matt Helm's 'cloud-cuckooland'. Carr never valued realism in fiction."

=== List of books ===
(all by Donald Hamilton)

1. Death of a Citizen (1960)
2. The Wrecking Crew (1960)
3. The Removers (1961)
4. The Silencers (1962)
5. Murderers' Row (1962)
6. The Ambushers (1963)
7. The Shadowers (1964)
8. The Ravagers (1964)
9. The Devastators (1965)
10. The Betrayers (1966)
11. The Menacers (1968)
12. The Interlopers (1969)
13. The Poisoners (1971)
14. The Intriguers (1972)
15. The Intimidators (1974)
16. The Terminators (1975)
17. The Retaliators (1976)
18. The Terrorizers (1977)
19. The Revengers (1982)
20. The Annihilators (1983)
21. The Infiltrators (1984)
22. The Detonators (1985)
23. The Vanishers (1986)
24. The Demolishers (1987)
25. The Frighteners (1989)
26. The Threateners (1992)
27. The Damagers (1993)
28. The Dominators – unpublished. Hamilton finished this novel in the late 1990s, and was reportedly revising it in preparation for seeking a publisher in mid-2002.

All of Hamilton's Matt Helm novels were first published in the United States by Fawcett Publications under their Gold Medal imprint.

These titles have since been republished by Titan Books.

== Matt Helm in other media ==
In 1965, Columbia Pictures acquired the film rights to eight Matt Helm novels. A five-film series of parody or spoof spy movies was planned and four were produced, debuting with The Silencers. They were made to star Dean Martin, who co-produced them with his Meadway-Claude Production company and received a share of the profits.

The films used the name Matt Helm, his cover identity, plus book titles and some very loose plot elements, but otherwise the series bore no resemblance to the character, atmosphere, or themes of Hamilton's original books, nor to the hard-edged action of Bond.

Martin played the part with his own persona of a fun-loving, easygoing, wisecracking playboy with plenty of references to singing and alcohol consumption. Helm's government agency, unnamed in the novels, was called Intelligence and Counter-Espionage (ICE) in the films. Like the Bond series, the Helm films featured a number of sexy women in each, sometimes referred to as "The Slaygirls". Martin co-starred in the films with popular '60s actresses such as Stella Stevens, Ann-Margret, Sharon Tate, Elke Sommer, Janice Rule and Tina Louise.

A 1970s TV series Matt Helm, which cast Tony Franciosa as Helm, an ex-spy turned private detective, also departed from the books and was unsuccessful.

In 2002, it was reported that DreamWorks had optioned the entire Helm book series. In 2005, Variety reported that DreamWorks had signed Michael Brandt and Derek Haas to write a screenplay for a high six-figure deal. According to the article, the film was to be a contemporary adaptation of the character, but no casting or release information was announced.

Paramount retained the film rights to the Matt Helm series after its 2008 split from DreamWorks. In 2009, it was reported that Alex Kurtzman and Roberto Orci would produce a more serious version of the Helm franchise, with Variety saying that the tone of Paul Attanasio's script had a similar tone to The Bourne Identity, and that Steven Spielberg was considering directing or producing.

In March 2018, Deadline Hollywood reported that Tom Shepard had been hired to rewrite the script, with Bradley Cooper attached to play Helm. Spielberg reportedly would remain involved in some unspecified capacity.

=== Films ===
(all starring Dean Martin as Helm)

1. The Silencers (1966)
2. Murderers' Row (1966)
3. The Ambushers (1967)
4. The Wrecking Crew (1969)

A fifth film was planned, based upon the novel The Ravagers, but Martin declined the opportunity to play the role again. The title of the film was announced at the end of The Wrecking Crew.

==== Box office performance ====
Film	U.S. release date	US/Canada theatrical rental	Ref(s)
The Silencers	February 18, 1966	$7,350,000	
Murderers' Row	December 20, 1966	$6,350,000	
The Ambushers	December 22, 1967	$4,700,000	
The Wrecking Crew	February 5, 1969	$2,400,000	
Total		$20,800,000	

==== Home media ====
Murderer's Row was initially released on VHS in 1980, with a reissue in 1987. The Ambushers was released on VHS in 1986, with a reissue in 1991. The Silencers and The Wrecking Crew were both released on VHS only in 1996, with no reissues for either film. The 1996 releases consisted of 2 box sets, one containing Murderer's Row and The Ambushers, with the other containing The Silencers and The Wrecking Crew. It is unknown if these releases were sold exclusively as box sets, or if they were also issued individually. A 4-DVD box set containing the four films was released in North America in December 2005.

=== Television series ===
A television series loosely based upon Hamilton's character was launched by the ABC Network in 1975. Titled simply Matt Helm, the series starred Anthony Franciosa as a retired spy who becomes a private detective. After being launched by a pilot TV movie, it ran for only 14 episodes.

=== Manga ===
In Japan, Jin Kimura (Japanese: 木村仁), also known as Mitsuhisa Kimura (Japanese: 木村光久) drew Matt Helm Series (Japanese: マット・ヘルム・シリーズ, Hepburn: Matto Herumu Shirīzu), based on the novels, in the Japanese magazine Boy's Life (Japanese: ボーイズライフ), November 1968 – March 1969.
