= Embassy (disambiguation) =

An embassy is a permanent diplomatic mission. Embassy may also refer to:

== Arts and entertainment ==
- Embassy (art installation), an art installation by Australian artist Richard Bell
- Embassy (novel), a 1969 novel by the British writer Stephen Coulter
  - Embassy (film), a 1972 British film based on the novel
- Embassy (magazine), a division of Hill Times Publishing, Inc.
- Embassy Pictures, an independent film studio and distributor
- Embassy Records, a record label owned by Woolworth Ltd
- Embassy Television, a former American television production company (1982–1998)
- Embassy (TV series), an Australian television series

== Other uses ==
- Embassy (cigarette), a British brand of cigarette
- Mogul Embassy, a wrestling stable in Ring of Honor formerly known as (The) Embassy
- PS Embassy, a ship

== See also ==
- The Embassy (disambiguation)
- Avco Embassy Television, a television production/distribution company operating from 1968 to 1976
- Embassy Suites by Hilton, a chain of hotels
- Embassy Theatre (disambiguation)
- On the False Embassy, either of two famous judicial orations, both delivered in BCE 343
