= Lockheed Martin F-35 Lightning II Canadian procurement =

Possible purchase of the F-35 for Canada

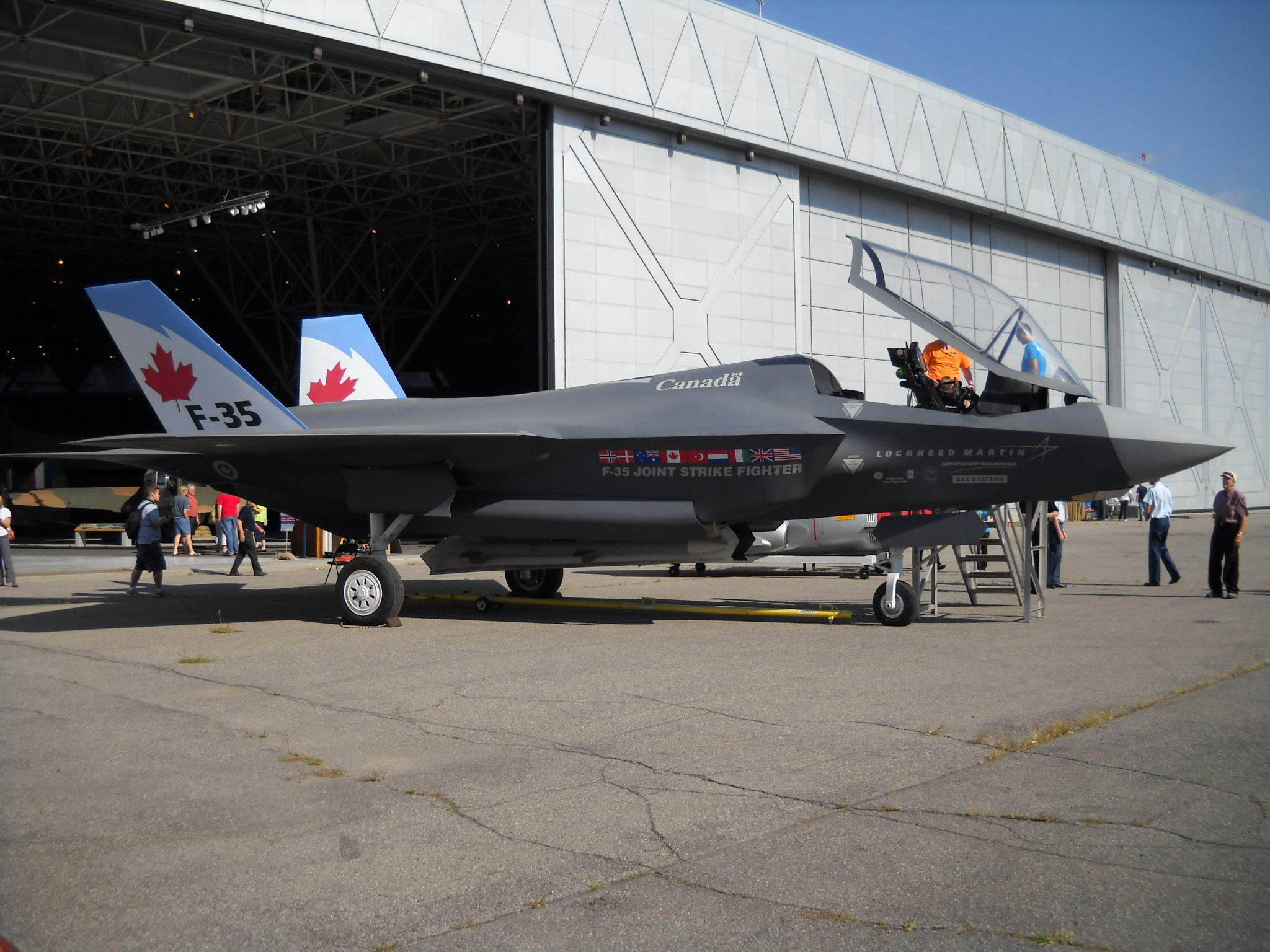
A wooden mock-up of the F-35 in Canadian Forces markings, 2010

The Lockheed Martin F-35 Lightning II Canadian procurement is a defence procurement project of the Canadian government to purchase Lockheed Martin F-35 Lightning II Joint Strike Fighters for the Royal Canadian Air Force (RCAF), a process started in 1997. The F-35 procurement has been a source of considerable controversy in public policy circles in Canada since the federal government announced its intention to purchase the aircraft in 2010. In April 2012, with the release of a highly critical Auditor General of Canada report on the failures of the government's F-35 program, the procurement was labelled a national "scandal" and "fiasco" by the media. In a December 2014 analysis of the procurement Ottawa Citizen writer Michael Den Tandt cited the Harper government's "ineptitude, piled upon ineptitude, and bureaucracy, and inertia, driving a lack of progress".

The F-35 was conceived by the United States Department of Defense as requiring participation from many countries, either contributing to the manufacturing of the aircraft or procuring it for their own armed forces. Canada, through the Department of National Defence (DND) and the departments of Public Works and Government Services Canada (PWGSC) and Industry Canada (IC), has been actively involved in the Joint Strike Fighter (JSF) project since 1997. Canada's initial participation required a US$10 million investment to be an "informed partner" during the evaluation process. Once Lockheed Martin was selected as the JSF's primary contractor, Canada elected to become a level-three participant (along with Norway, Denmark, Turkey, and Australia) in the project. An additional US$100 million from DND over 10 years and another $50 million from IC were dedicated in 2002.

On 16 July 2010, Prime Minister Stephen Harper's Conservative government announced that it intended to procure 65 F-35s to replace the existing 80 McDonnell Douglas CF-18 Hornets for C$9 billion (C$16 billion with all ancillary costs, such as maintenance, included) with deliveries planned for 2016. Former Minister of National Defence, Peter MacKay, argued that these ancillary cost estimates were grossly exaggerated because they included the pilots salaries, and fuel for the aircraft, which were never before factored into procurement costs. The stated intention was to sign a sole-sourced, untendered contract with Lockheed Martin. This, combined with the government's refusal to provide detailed costing of the procurement, became one of the major causes of the finding of contempt of Parliament and the subsequent defeat of the Conservative government through a non-confidence vote on 25 March 2011. The F-35 purchase was a major issue in the Canadian 2011 federal election, which resulted in a Conservative majority government.

On 19 October 2015, the Liberal Party of Canada under Justin Trudeau won a majority in part on a campaign promise to not buy the F-35, but instead "one of the many, lower-priced options that better match Canada's defence needs".

A formal competition was launched to select a new fighter, which included the F-35. On 28 March 2022, the government announced that the competition process had selected the F-35A and that negotiations would begin with Lockheed Martin to purchase 88 aircraft. By 20 December 2022, the Department of National Defence received approval to spend $7 billion on 16 F-35As and related equipment, including training systems, potential weapons and support infrastructure.

== Level 3 industrial partner ==
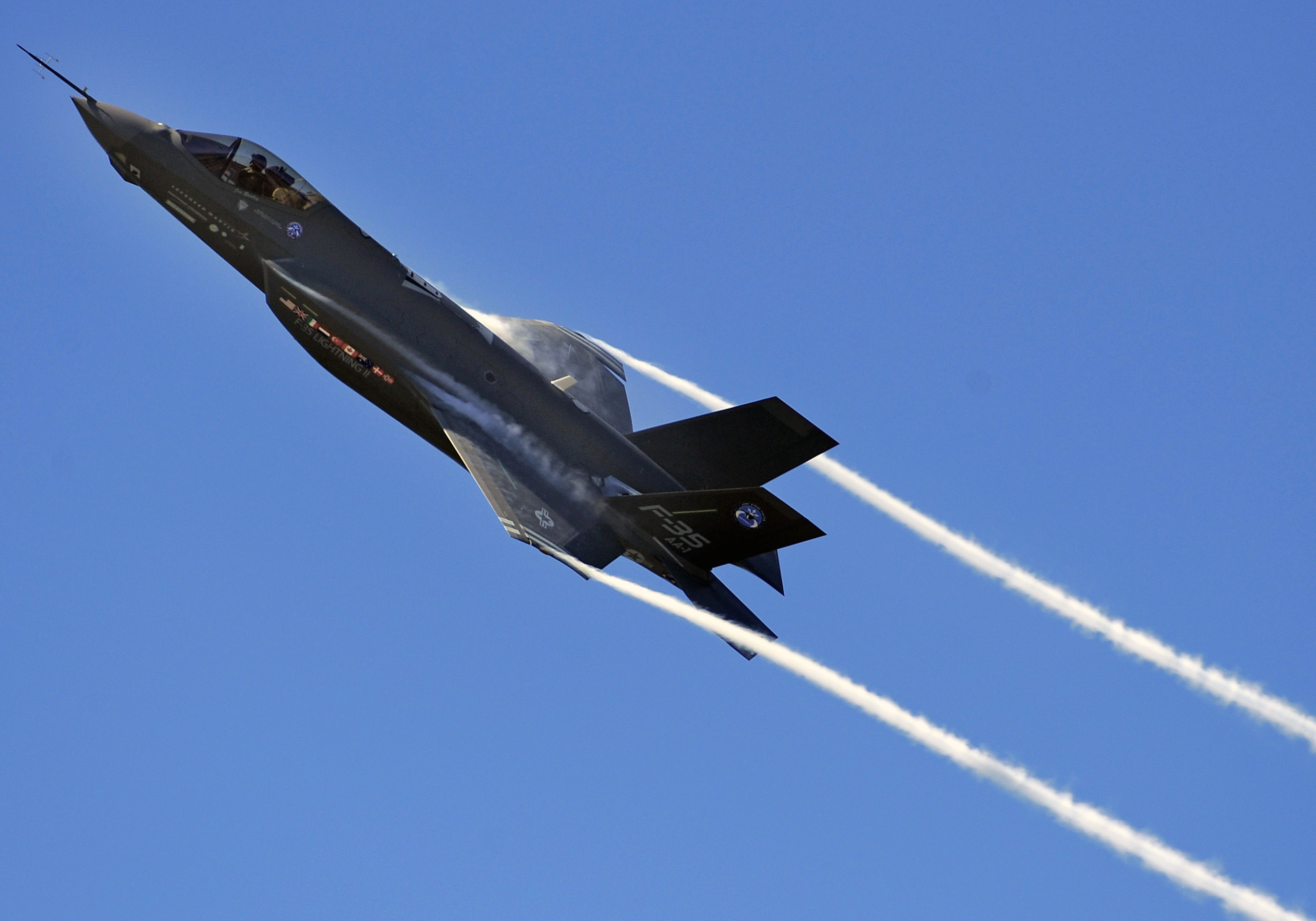
An F-35 Lightning II test aircraft with the Canadian flag, along with those of other industrial participants, painted on it.

Alan S. Williams of Queen's University, the former Assistant Deputy Minister of National Defence (Matériel) who signed the original industrial participation agreement, indicated he believes that the Government of Canada's rationale for joining the JSF project was not due to an urgent need to replace the Canadian Forces' CF-18 Hornet fleet; instead, it was driven primarily by economics. Through the government's investment in the JSF, Williams said that Canadian companies were allowed to compete for contracts within the JSF project; there were fears that being shut out from industrial participation in such a large program would severely damage Canada's aviation industry. Joining the JSF project also furthered Canadian Forces access to information regarding the F-35 as a possible contender when it eventually plans to replace the CF-18. Improved interoperability with major allies allowed the Canadian Forces to gain insight on leading edge practices in composites, manufacturing and logistics, and offered the ability to recoup some investment if the government did decide to purchase the F-35.

As a result of the Government of Canada's involvement in the JSF project, 144 contracts were awarded to Canadian companies, universities, and government facilities. Financially, the contracts were valued at US$490 million for the period 2002 to 2012, with an expected value of US$1.1 billion from current contracts in the period between 2013 and 2023, and a total potential estimated value of Canada's involvement in the JSF project from US$4.8 billion to US$6.8 billion. By 2013, the potential benefits to Canadian firms had risen to $9.9 billion.

== History ==
=== Pre-2006 ===
Canada began its investment in the F-35 program in 1997 under the Liberal government of Jean Chrétien, when the Department of National Defence (DND) committed $10M to join the "Concept Demonstration" phase of the Joint Strike Fighter program. In 2002 Canada invested another $150M to participate in the System Development and Demonstration phase which was scheduled for more than 10 years. In 2006 the Canadian government, along with its allies; the United States, the United Kingdom, the Netherlands, Denmark, Australia, Turkey, Italy and Norway signed a memorandum of understanding, at an anticipated cost of over half a billion dollars to Canada, for "Production, Sustainment and Follow-on Development" for the period 2007 to 2051.

=== 2006–2009 ===
The Canadian air force concluded the F-35 was the most cost effective plane to meet its needs. However, only one JSF test model existed at that time and there was no way to actually prove the JSF had the lowest cost per aircraft or that it would be the cheapest to fly. Announcing a "strong preference" for the F-35 according to the Auditor General.

Canada signed a Memorandum of Understanding for the next phase of JSF development under a Conservative government, expected to cost US$551 million through 2051. Canada emphasized that the commitment does not mean Canada would purchase the plane. Canada also had to accept F-35 procurement rules, according to the auditor general, who claimed ministers were not fully informed of this aspect.

On 12 May 2008, the Canada First Defence Strategy called for replacing the CF-18 fleet, beginning in 2017. The DND asked the Conservative government for permission to buy the F-35, but permission was denied.

=== 2010 ===
==== Early 2010 ====
The Pentagon notifies Canada that the U.S. is "reassessing its cost projections" because of expected delays in development, according to the auditor general.

Conservative Defence Minister Peter MacKay told the Commons that Canada would buy the F-35. Ninety minutes later, he said he misspoke and announced there will be an open competition with all aircraft considered. Six weeks later, ignoring what he previously said, MacKay announced that Canada will purchase 65 F-35s. The cost was estimated by the government as $9 billion. Deliveries were to begin in 2016.

On 16 July 2010, the government announced plans to acquire 65 F-35s, calling it the only fifth-generation design that can meet Canada's needs and ensure interoperability with NATO allies. The DND estimated a $9-billion acquisition cost. Opposition parties queried the F-35's sole-sourcing. The auditor general later concluded: "in the lead-up to this announcement, required documents were prepared and key steps were taken out of sequence. Key decisions were made without required approvals or supporting documentation." Public Works officials received a more formal statement of operational requirements from the DND as required to justify procuring the F-35 without a competition.

==== Late 2010 ====
The Montreal Gazette reported in September 2010 that the Canadian Forces had planned to hold a competition in 2010, award a contract in 2012, and for the new fighter to become operational between 2018 and 2023, when the sole sourced contract was announced.

On 6 October 2010, retired Assistant Deputy Minister of National Defence (Matériel) Alan Williams testified before the House of Commons Defence Committee regarding the F-35, which the Canadian media had referring to as a Flying Credit Card – with no prefixed spending limit. Williams was the ADM who signed the original industrial participation contract for the F-35 project on behalf of the government. In his testimony, Williams indicated that the lack of a competition was likely to squander billions of dollars in taxes and lost business opportunities: "Procurement demands not only the highest degree of integrity, but also the appearance of the highest degree of integrity. Undertaking sole-source deals leaves the procurement process more vulnerable to fraud, bribery and behind the scene deal making and leaves the federal government more susceptible to such charges." Williams labelled Minister of National Defence Peter MacKay's logic in defending the F-35 as "flawed ... [it] insults our intelligence". Prime Minister Stephen Harper responded to Williams' testimony, attacking his integrity and accused him of changing his mind. Williams in turn responded to Harper: "That's a lie ... I've never ever changed my opinion about sole-sourcing. I have no idea to what he's referring to. I take great offence to that."

On 14 October 2010, the Canadian Centre for Policy Alternatives issued a report on the proposed F-35 buy entitled Pilot Error – Why the F-35 Lightning II stealth fighter is wrong for Canada. CCPA research associate, Rideau Institute president, and co-founder of Ceasefire Canada, Steven Staples stated: "Canada does not need the F-35, either for North American/domestic roles or for expeditionary roles. The Canadian government should not proceed ... [it] has put Lockheed Martin in an extremely strong bargaining position in future negotiations over maintenance costs." On government claims of Canadian aerospace jobs from the purchase, Staples wrote: "such claims are dubious at best ... [the contract has] none of the spelled out 'offsets' that are typically built into such procurement projects." Staples concluded that Canada should: curtail the expeditionary role for Canadian aircraft; stretch the life of the existing CF-18s by restricting them to North American/domestic air surveillance and control; investigate the acquisition of unarmed long-endurance pilotless aircraft to undertake surveillance/reconnaissance missions and eventually air control duties; and use any savings via these measures to more effectively contribute to security.

On 26 October 2010, Sheila Fraser, Auditor General of Canada, identified "troubling" systemic problems, rigged competitions and cost overruns in defence procurement programs and indicated that the F-35 may cost far more than the budgeted numbers. Following Fraser's report Liberal leader Michael Ignatieff stated that if elected a Liberal government would cancel the sole-sourced deal and hold a formal competition to replace the CF-18.

Retired Canadian Forces Lieutenant-General Angus Watt in October 2010 said of the F-35: "It's the best of all the available choices. It provides the best value for money, the best platform to address the security needs of Canada through to 2050, which is probably how long we'll have this airplane ... The F-35 gives us a jet at the beginning of its technological life span. If you buy a jet at the end of its life span, that means in five to ten years it's going to be obsolete. That means you're going to have to try to add technology and that's really tough. The growth potential, the ability to evolve this jet over the next 30–40 years, far surpasses anything else on the market ... Stealth is not some voodoo technology ... It simply allows the pilot to survive. It isn't necessary for every mission, but for some. For instance, reconnaissance. They can go quietly into territory, undetected, and come back safely. Or they can do a mission like the Kosovo bombing campaign, where there was a fairly sophisticated air defence system, and come back completely safely."

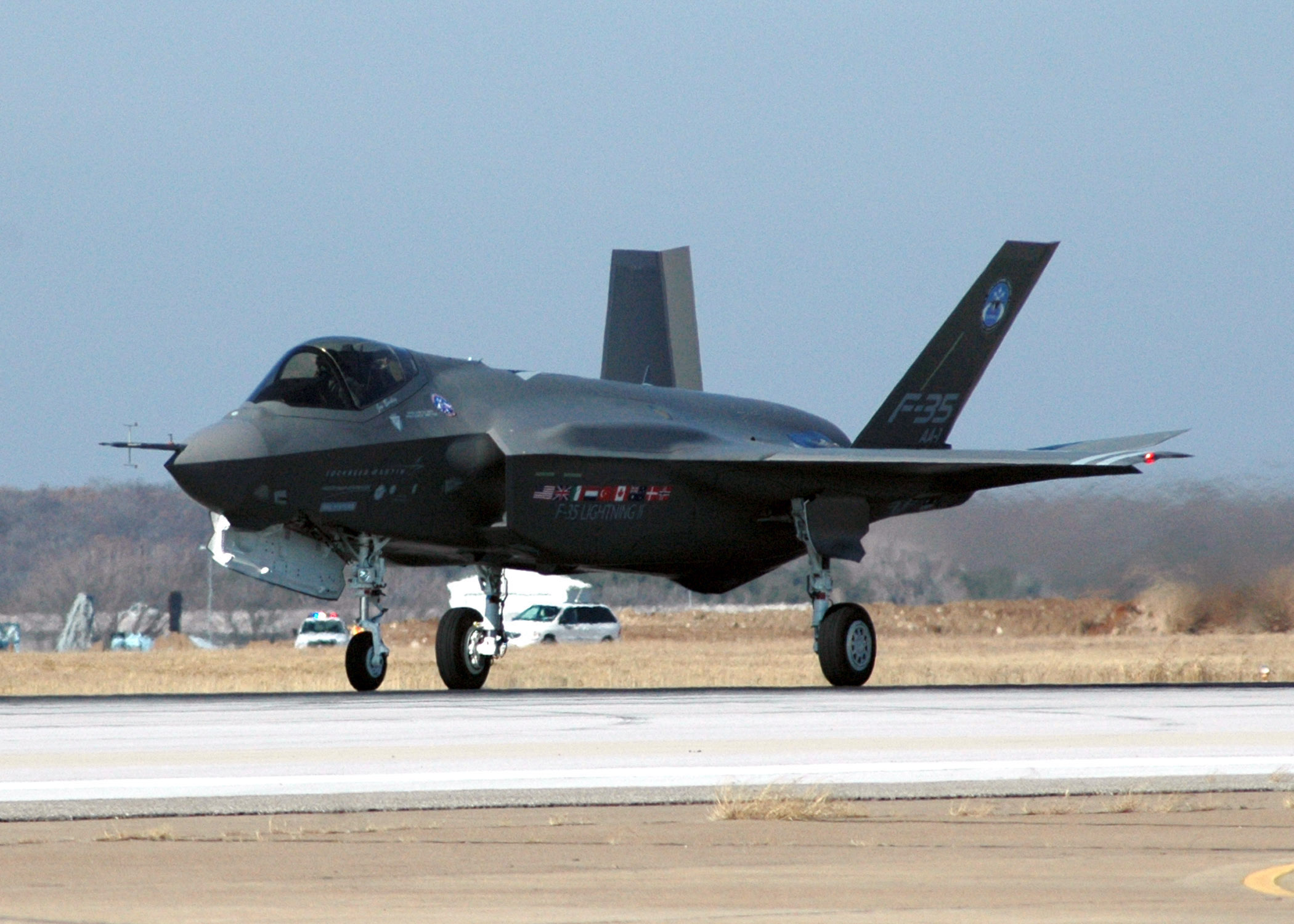
An F-35 test aircraft, showing the Canadian flag on it

In November 2010, representatives of both Boeing and Dassault Aviation formally complained before a Canadian parliamentary committee that, while their F/A-18 Super Hornet and Rafale fighters would satisfy all Canadian Forces requirements, they were not considered and DND officials did not even request detailed data. In December 2010, Eurofighter and Saab offered their own fourth generation fighters – the Typhoon and Gripen, respectively – for less than the F-35's cost, but the Government of Canada stated that the F-35's stealth was the best way to ensure that pilots could safely complete future missions. Chief of the air staff, Lieutenant-General André Deschamps, stated that stealth adds survivability for foreign missions and the element of surprise in Canada's airspace. Philippe Lagassé, a defence analyst at the University of Ottawa, disagreed that stealth benefits domestic interception.

On 17 November, the Standing Committee on Finance asked the parliamentary budget officer to analyze F-35 costs. On 18 November, the House of Commons debated a Liberal motion to immediately cancel the F-35 process. In December 2010, staff from the Canadian Forces' Directorate of Air Requirements stated that only the F-35 matched their list of 14 mandatory and 56 less absolute requirements, and claimed that the list was not devised to ensure that only the F-35 met these requirements, which were not publicly released on national security grounds.

A national poll conducted by Abacus Data between 29 October and 1 November 2010 indicated 35% of Canadians supported the F-35 while 37% opposed. A poll conducted by EKOS Research Associates between 3–9 November 2010 showed that 54% of Canadians opposed the F-35 buy and that the largest group "strongly oppose" it, at 34%. The same poll showed support for the Conservative government had fallen below 30%.

By late 2010, Canada's political parties had outlined their positions on the F-35. The Conservatives had declared it their top defence priority, the Liberals indicated that they would hold a competition to select a new fighter, the New Democratic Party was opposed to the purchase and the Bloc Québécois were in favour of it only as long as Quebec aerospace firms get a share of the work.

=== 2011 ===
==== January 2011 ====
In January 2011, United States Secretary of Defense Robert Gates stated that the F-35B variant would be put on two years probation due to delays and development difficulties and that the program was troubled. The announcement led to DND officials assuring that Canadian F-35 deliveries would not be delayed. Major-General Tom Lawson, the Assistant Chief of the Air Staff stated: "without hesitation ... this is the only aircraft for the future." Opposition industry critic Marc Garneau responded: "You can say that there's nothing new here that affects Canada. But all of the concerns that we've expressed in the past continue to exist. And I, from my point of view, feel that we're not out of the woods with the development of this aircraft ... We should be only looking at an aircraft that is certified, developed, and for which we have a firm cost and a delivery. And that's obviously not the case today." NDP national defence critic Jack Harris said: "It indicates that the program itself has significant flaws."

The Government continued to defend the F-35, drawing parallels with the Liberal cancellation of the EH-101 helicopter in 1993. Prime Minister Stephen Harper made speeches at aerospace plants in an attempt to gain support. The Liberal party accused Harper of hypocrisy, as records indicate he was in favour of the EH-101 cancellation at the time. Liberal industry critic Marc Garneau explained his party's position on competitively selecting a new fighter: "We know we can get a better deal for Canadians, with guaranteed offsets." He also questioned the utility of a short-range, single engine fighter: "all things being equal, two engines are better than one." General Walter Natynczyk, Chief of Defence Staff, entered the debate in January 2011 to counter a new Liberal Party advertising campaign questioning the F-35. In an interview with The Globe and Mail Natynczyk stated: "From my perspective, the F-35 is the best aircraft with the best value for Canada ... The cost per unit is the cheapest for any fourth- or fifth-generation aircraft".

In January 2011, the Government enlisted the aid of two retired generals, Paul Manson and Angus Watt, to write a defence of the purchase, entitled The truth about those jets. Their position, particularly on the lack of need for a competition, was refuted by former Assistant Deputy Minister of National Defence (Materiel) Alan Williams: "For Canada to commit to purchase an aircraft without knowing for certain what it will cost nor how it will perform operationally makes no sense. If the F-35 is, in fact, the best aircraft for Canada it will win a competition. I cannot understand why its supporters are fearful of subjecting it to an open, fair and transparent competition." Other observers pointed out that, while Manson had described himself as a "former Chief of Defence Staff" in his article, he neglected to mention his chairmanship of Lockheed Martin Canada, a wholly owned subsidiary of Lockheed Martin. Steven Staples, President of the Rideau Institute, said: "While this fact in no way disqualifies the generals from sharing their opinion, it is an important truth about the F-35 debate that the stealth fighters' strongest backers are the military and the aerospace companies. In fact, it's getting awfully hard to tell them apart." In February 2011, opposition critic Marc Garneau criticized the incurring of over C$200,000 in overtime and travel expenses for military personnel and civil servants to defend the F-35, calling the use of Canadian military staff "unprecedented". Liberal MP Bryon Wilfert, who reviewed DND public service overtime statistics, stated: "The lines are being blurred between government (workers) and the Conservative Party. This is supposed to stand on its own as the best aircraft that we need, so why is it up to civil servants to sell it to the public?"

The Government of Canada planned to purchase the F-35A, the same model as the United States Air Force (USAF). However, unlike the F-35C (for the United States Navy and United States Marine Corps), the F-35A cannot refuel from the Canadian Forces' existing tanker aircraft, which use the US Navy-style probe and drogue system. Additionally, the F-35A cannot land on the short runways of the Canadian Forces' forward operating air strips in the Arctic. Defence Minister Peter MacKay stated that both issues will be dealt with. Thus, Canada's F-35 were to differ from the USAF F-35A through the addition of a USN/USMC F-35B/C style refueling probe and a drag chute.

Harper attacked the Liberal calls for a competition, citing damages to Canada's aerospace sector: "I don't understand how the Liberal MPs from this region could want to cancel the contract". Critics stated that, as no contract had been signed, Harper was misleading.

==== March 2011 ====
On 10 March 2011 the Parliamentary Budget Officer, Kevin Page presented a cost analysis of the F-35 program and concluding a total cost C$29.3B over 30 years, not the C$16B to C$18B claimed by the government, and a resulting per aircraft cost of C$450M each. Minister of National Defence Peter MacKay stated that cancelling the deal would "endanger the lives of Canadian pilots" and "endanger the sovereignty of this country", although he did not give specifics as to why that would be the case. In an editorial, The Globe and Mail said, "The PBO raises sharp questions. An accountable government, one that tried to convince on the basis of evidence, would answer them." The government questioned some of Page's assumptions, such as the 30 years lifespan instead of the planned 20. After reviewing the report, the opposition Bloc Québécois leader Gilles Duceppe was reportedly shocked by the cost and changed his mind on supporting the sole-sourced F-35 procurement and began to oppose it as unaffordable, favouring open competition instead. The DND responded with details of a $16 billion cost estimate, over a 20-year lifespan only. On 23 March 2011, Page responded to the Assistant Deputy Minister of National Defence, claiming that Page made mathematical errors on both the individual F-35 cost and on long-term maintenance; Page indicated that the latest US Department of Defense estimates are for US$151M per aircraft and that the USAF would not pay more for the F-35 than its allies. MPs reached a deadlock over a Tory attempt to strike Page's testimony.

Laurie Hawn, Parliamentary Secretary to the Minister of National Defence, stated that they expected a purchase price to be between $70 and 75 million each, based on conversations with other customers. He defended the 20-year budget figure and said "It really is the best airplane for the best price with the best benefit to Canadian industry to serve our military's needs for the next 40 years".

In March 2011, retired Assistant Deputy Minister of National Defence (Matériel), Alan Williams, questioned claims that the F-35 would only cost $75M per aircraft in an article entitled Let's be honest about the price tag on those planes. He stated: "In reviewing the government material tabled on March 17, 2010 before the Parliamentary and House Affairs Committee, it appears to me that the $75-million figure is not the "procurement cost" but rather the "unit recurring flyaway cost", which is merely part of the procurement cost ... None of us can know for certain what the final cost to acquire the F-35 will be until we get a firm price quote. As production increases, the costs may drop. Nevertheless, all evidence to date indicates that we would pay over $120 million per aircraft, rather than $75 million." Echoing Williams' statements, Mike Sullivan, Director of Acquisition Management at the US Government Accountability Office, said he doesn't know where the $75 million estimate comes from: "That's not a number that I am familiar with at all ... [the price is] probably somewhere between $110–115 million". On 30 March 2011, the Canadian foreign policy Embassy magazine reported: "While Lockheed says the F-35 A-variant will cost $70 to $75 million, the PBO said on Mar. 10 that this plane will likely cost between $148 and $163 million, twice the original Government of Canada estimate. The US GAO put out its annual report on the JSF program on 15 March 2011 and said there were significant per-plane cost increases as well, putting the cost of each A-variant at $127 million."

On 21 March, a parliamentary committee recommended the government be held in contempt of Parliament for failing to provide enough documents, including per-plane F-35 cost estimates.

Commentators suggested that the deployment of six CF-18s to Operation Odyssey Dawn was to symbolically make the case for the F-35. Prime Minister Stephen Harper and Conservative Party caucus members suggested that the Libyan mission shows a need for the F-35, while others, such as Winslow Wheeler, an analyst with the Center for Defense Information in Washington, noted that the US only sent non-stealth aircraft to Libya, and stated: "[The F-35 is the] culmination of such malevolent trends ... a poor choice ... for the United States — and for Canada". Lockheed had previously replied to similar points to Wheeler's, suggesting that comparisons between legacy fighters and the F-35 ought to be with added equipment equivalent to the latter's built-in capabilities.

Polling conducted in March 2011 by Nanos Research showed that the majority of Canadians opposed the F-35 buy, with 68% of Canadians agreeing with the statement "now is not a good time" to proceed. 56% of those identified as Conservatives opposed the purchase, as did 75% of undecided voters, while only 27% of those polled supported it. This poll showed increased public opposition to the F-35 over a similar poll conducted in November 2010.

==== F-35 as an election issue ====
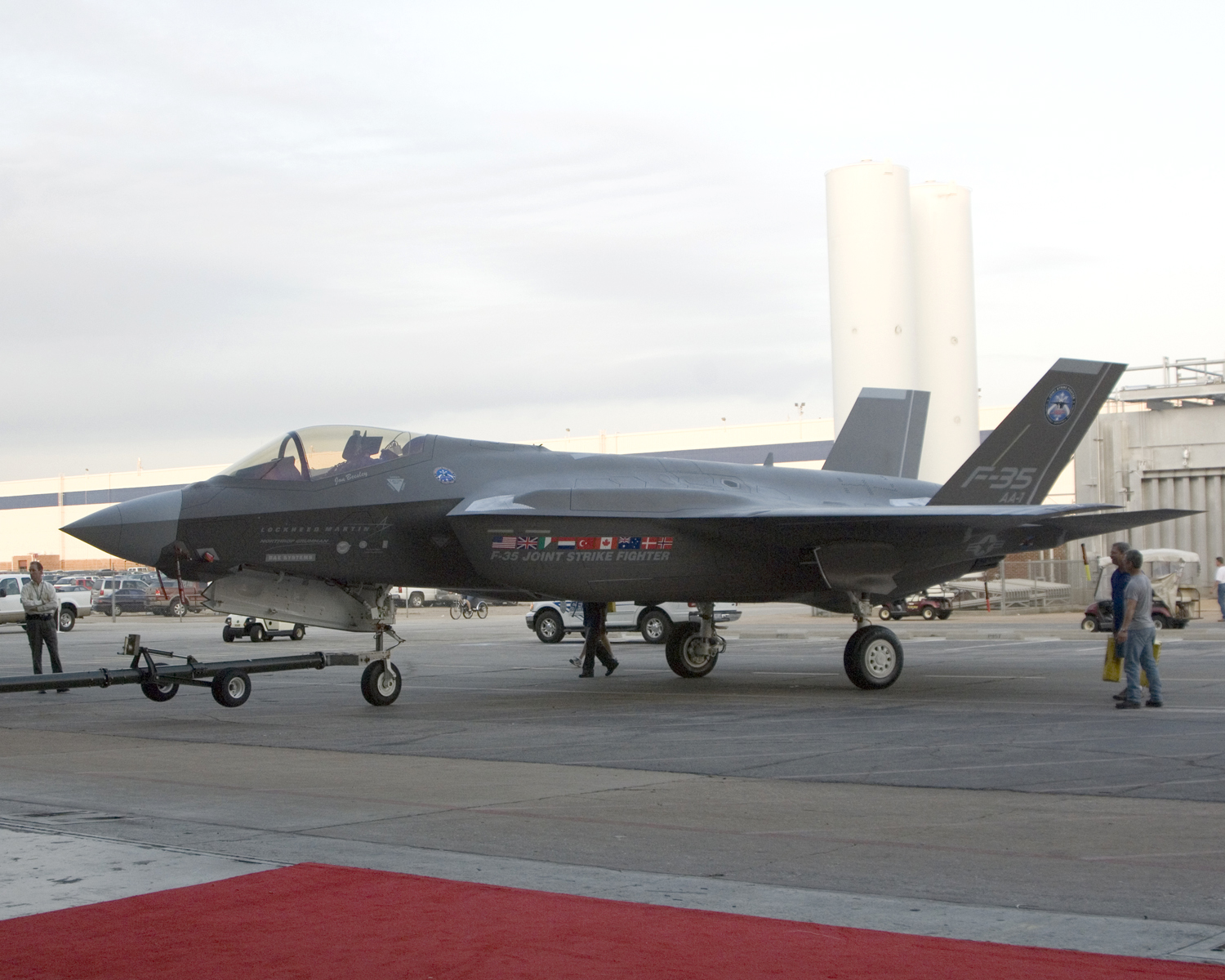
F-35A towed out at the Inauguration Ceremony on 7 July 2006, showing the Canadian flag

On 22 March 2011, the Conservative government's budget presentation was poorly received by all three opposition parties. Liberal Party leader Michael Ignatieff moved a motion of non-confidence on 26 March 2011, which declared the government to be in contempt of Parliament over withheld costing data on prison construction and the F-35. All opposition parties supported the motion, triggering the 2011 federal election, in which the F-35 was a key issue.

On 28 March 2011, The Globe and Mail revealed that the Conservative Party candidate for the Ontario riding of Algoma-Manitoulin-Kapuskasing, Raymond Sturgeon, was until December 2010 a paid lobbyist working at CFN Consultants and lobbying the government on behalf of Lockheed Martin. Sturgeon stopped lobbying one month before he won the nomination. The federal government's lobbyists' registry noted that Sturgeon had worked for Lockheed Martin on: "marketing strategy for the sale of aircraft and aircraft components to the department of national defence." The riding was not won by Sturgeon, but was retained by NDP MP Carol Hughes.

On 28 March 2011, Liberal leader Michael Ignatieff outlined his primary objection to the F-35, noting that its huge price tag would prevent the proper funding of future health care. He reiterated that Canada needed to replace the CF-18, but that a Liberal government would hold an open competition and indicated that the government has "absolutely got to deliver the right plane at the right price. We can't fool around here, there's only so much money to go around" and labelled the government's position as "deeply irresponsible". Critics of a competition pointed to the lack of rival stealth fighters to compete with the F-35 while Liberals question the need for stealth at all.

On 30 March 2011, Carl Meyer wrote in the Canadian foreign policy publication Embassy magazine: "The F-35 is already promising to be a big issue in Campaign 2011 with the Liberals raising it several times ... the Conservatives are trying to contain the fallout ... that one of their candidates in the current election was a lobbyist until last December for Lockheed. Pollsters say the fighter jet tops the short list of foreign policy controversies that could end up defining the campaign if leaders begin pushing the issue as a ballot box question." A poll conducted in the first two days of campaigning by Forum Research indicated that over 60% of Canadians oppose the F-35 buy.

The topic became an issue in some riding races in the election. In the Ottawa-area riding of Carleton-Mississippi Mills incumbent Conservative MP Gordon O'Connor, a retired Canadian Army general and former Minister of National Defence who was serving as the chief government whip, was challenged by retired Canadian Forces navigator Lieutenant Colonel Karen McCrimmon, running as a Liberal. McCrimmon stated that the F-35 is not suitable for Canada as it was under development, had not been evaluated for cold-weather operations, cannot safely use small northern deployment runways, is incompatible with Canada's in-flight refuelling tankers, and its single engine could not provide twin-engined reliability for use in the Arctic. O'Connor defended the F-35 as suitable as it won an intense four-year US competition: "The aircraft is in the final stages of its development: it's a world leader."

On 5 April 2011, at a Parliament Hill press conference, Winslow Wheeler, of the Center for Defense Information in Washington said of the F-35's pricing that "nobody on this earth" will pay just $75M, indicating that Parliamentary Budget Officer Kevin Page's numbers were "by far and away" more accurate than the government estimates, and stated: "This airplane is nothing to write home about ... a gigantic performance disappointment ... you're getting an underperforming airplane for a huge amount of money". Wheeler recommended Canada hold a competition to choose an aircraft instead of a sole-sourced purchase. On 10 April 2011, Harper stated that the US would pay more for the F-35 and Canada had a fixed price free from cost overruns: "On the F-35s, I think we've been clear: there have been detailed briefings from the department of national defence on this, there's a memorandum of understanding that's posted. We are sheltered from research and development costs." On the Liberal plan to hold a competition, he said: "This is a good deal for the country, the fantasy is on the other side. That somehow they're going to come up with some airplane out of thin air and they don't even know what airplane, they're still going to buy planes they say but they don't know airplane and they don't have any agreement."

On 17 April 2011, multiple newspapers reported that the government's C$14 billion costing does not include the F-35's engines. The engines are listed as "government furnished equipment", indicating they must be purchased separately. Representatives of the government and the DOD responded that the engine costs were included the overall price. On 19 April 2011, retired Canadian Forces Lieutenant-General Angus Watt indicated that the engines are not included in the purchase from Lockheed Martin, but are purchased separately from Pratt & Whitney and are included in the overall price quoted. He stated that the quote of C$75M per aircraft does not include some spares, weapons or infrastructure costs and thus is not comparable to quoted US costs which do include those items; and that if included would bring unit cost to about C$138M per aircraft, comparable to current US pricing. He concluded, "the airplane has not suddenly become more expensive. It is simply a matter of which costs you directly attribute to the airplane."

In April 2011, the DND issued a statement indicating that the F-35 unit price would be higher than $75M each due to development overruns. Pentagon information revealed operating costs to also be much higher than the Government of Canada had previously indicated, even higher than the Parliamentary Budget Officer had forecast and will total more than C$24B over 30 years for 65 aircraft. Harper was dismissive of the DND statement, stating that contingency funds would cover extra costs: "many of the reports you're citing are comparing apples to oranges. Our experts have put out their detailed figures and everything we've seen is within those figures and their contingencies — the contingencies that have been allowed." Liberal Party Leader Michael Ignatieff stated: "they say to the Canadian people we can get you the plane at the right price. Let me tell you folks. Not even President Obama knows what the planes are going to cost. This thing is out of control." Bloc Québécois Leader Gilles Duceppe said: "What we've said since the very beginning and when Mr. Harper is saying, he [doesn't] want to withdraw a contract, that means there's a contract. It's time until next Monday that he showed us that contract."

===== 2011 election party platforms =====
On 3 April 2011 the Liberal party released their policy document for the election campaign entitled Your Family. Your Future. Your Canada. Of the F-35 it stated:

A Liberal government will immediately cancel the mismanaged $30 billion sole-source deal for F-35 stealth fighter jets, and save billions of dollars. In the largest procurement in Canadian history, the Harper government never explained why that plane is essential at this time. It still cannot say what the actual price will be, and secured no guarantee for industrial benefits. Other countries, including the US, are scaling back orders for an aircraft still under development, but the Conservatives charged ahead, despite the facts. There is a more responsible way to proceed. After cancelling the Harper deal, a Liberal government will put further steps on hold during a review of all military procurement in light of the new international policy described in this Global Networks Strategy. This review will include Canada's search and rescue requirements as well as the needs of our air, naval and land forces. When Canada purchases new fighter planes, we will have a transparent, competitive process to procure equipment that best meets our needs, achieves best value for money, secures maximum industrial benefits, and fits a realistic budget.

On 4 April 2011, the Bloc Québécois released their policy document entitled Parlons Qc (English: Let's Talk Quebec). There was no mention of the F-35 or the subject of defence at all; the party had previously stated opposition to the purchase as a result of the Parliamentary Budget Officer's March 2011 report outlining the F-35's estimated costs.

On 7 April 2011, the Green Party of Canada released their policy document, entitled smart economy. strong communities. true democracy. The policy did not mention the F-35 by name but did state that a Green government would reorient the armed forces towards peacekeeping, and reduce military spending to the 2005 level; and stated that the party would: "Support the transition from a Department of Defence into a Department of Peace and Security".

On 8 April 2011, the Conservative Party of Canada released their policy platform document entitled Stephen Harper's Low-Tax Plan For Jobs and Economic Growth. Of the F-35, it stated:

Support Canadian Aerospace Jobs – Stephen Harper's Government has provided strong support for jobs in Canada's world-class aerospace industry. Among other things, we have committed to purchasing the next-generation fighter jet, the F-35 – a necessary and responsible investment to re-equip Canada's air force and to strengthen Canadian sovereignty. The previous Liberal government invested in the development of the F-35, and we supported the decision, because it was and is the best option for Canada. But now Michael Ignatieff and his Coalition partners, the NDP and Bloc Québécois, have promised to scrap it – a reckless and irresponsible promise which would sacrifice $12 billion in possible economic benefits across the country, and kill thousands of Canadian jobs. A re-elected Stephen Harper Government will follow through on the purchase of the F-35, to strengthen the Canadian Armed Forces and to support thousands of jobs for Canadian aerospace workers across the country ... Strengthen the Canadian Armed Forces ... We have also committed to buying the next-generation fighter jet, the F-35 Joint Strike Fighter for our air force. The development of the F-35 is a cooperative program including Canada, the US, the United Kingdom, Australia, Denmark, Italy, the Netherlands, Norway, and Turkey. The F-35 purchase is necessary to replace the current fleet of CF-18s before they are no longer useable, and to ensure Canada's fighter jets are compatible with those of our NATO allies. The investment will be made gradually over the next 15 years, most of it beginning only in 2015, once the budget is balanced. The previous Liberal government invested in the development of the F-35, and we supported the decision, because it was and is the best option for Canada. But now Michael Ignatieff and his Coalition partners, the NDP and Bloc Québécois, have promised to scrap it – a reckless and irresponsible promise which would kill thousands of well-paid, highly-skilled Canadian jobs and deny the men and women of our air force the modern equipment they need to do their job. A re-elected Stephen Harper Government will follow through on the purchase of the F-35, to ensure our air force personnel have the tools they need to defend our country in the years to come.

Reacting to the Conservative policy direction on the F-35, NDP leader Jack Layton stated, "without question, Stephen Harper's high-risk procurement strategy on the fighter jets places in doubt whether he has the right priorities for Canadian Forces or that he can get the job done" and indicated that decision will lead to "unstable employment, lack of capital investment, high-quality, value-added jobs being shipped overseas." Layton indicated that the country has not had a defence white paper since 1994, and that a new white paper needed to set Canadian defence priorities before decisions on aircraft were made.

On 10 April 2011 the New Democratic Party released their policy platform entitled Giving your family a break – Practical first steps. On the F-35, it stated:

We will draft a Defence White Paper, redefining our military's role, its priorities and needs, to be completed within 12 months. During that time, all major defence projects will be reviewed; We will implement a fair and open process where competitors can offer industrial deals and benefits. Such an open process ensures Canadians get the best price, the military gets what it needs and Canadian industries get the best spin-offs; We will review the proposed F-35 purchase as part of the Defence White Paper.

===== Leaders' debates and results =====
During the English-language leaders' debate held in Ottawa on 12 April 2011, the F-35 buy was attacked by all opposition leaders and defended by Stephen Harper. In the debate Liberal leader Michael Ignatieff explained his reasoning for the election, which included the F-35: "I think I explained why we're having an election, which is that we asked for the truth about his jets, jails and corporate tax breaks, and (Harper) didn't tell the House of Commons the truth so he was found in contempt. That's why we're having an election."

In remarks made after the debate Bloc Québécois leader Gilles Duceppe attacked the Conservative F-35 price estimates, saying, "Well, I would imagine if you have a contract, you know how much it costs. (Harper) says he doesn't know. He refused to answer that. So we're going from $75 million for a fighter aircraft that probably doesn't even have a motor, that has no attack or defence system in it. Did we buy kites? What did we buy?"

The French-language debate was held on 13 April 2011 and also prominently featured the F-35. Liberal leader Michael Ignatieff accused the Harper government of having "forgotten people" affected by the Late 2000s recession and indicated that the Conservatives intend to spend billions on fighters, corporate tax cuts and new super-prisons, while ignoring regional economic development. Bloc Québécois leader Gilles Duceppe attacked Harper over multiple reports that indicate Canada will pay far more for the F-35 than the government's figure of C$75M per aircraft and challenged him to reveal its actual cost. Harper responded: "I'm the only leader on this platform, on this set, who is defending the role of our Canadian and Quebec aerospace sector in the purchasing of airplanes."

Ignatieff pointed out that even the US, the country that is building the F-35, doesn't know what they will cost. Ignatieff stated, "Even President Obama doesn't know how much it will cost the US. That's the first problem. And you have no real idea what the plane will cost you because they're still developing this plane. So we don't know how much it will cost. And as a potential prime minister I can't accept a plane, the cost of which is increasing." Speaking in Vancouver on 17 April 2011, Ignatieff said of Harper: "This guy has gone down to the first car lot and bought the first car he saw. And now we don't even know whether it has an engine, we're not perfectly sure it's got a steering wheel and the wheels might not be in the deal either ... The deal here that every Canadian needs to understand about the F-35 is that it is an airplane in development ... and the costs keeping going up." Ignatieff indicated that US officials are "tearing their hair out at the cost overruns" over the F-35. He further stated, "Mr. Harper is going around trying to tell Canadians, 'I know what this plane is going to cost.' (U.S.) President (Barack) Obama doesn't know what this plane is going to cost." Ignatieff agreed that the CF-18 needed replacing, but said: "but we have to get the right plane at the right price at the right time and that has to be mean a competitive bid."

On 2 May 2011, the election was held, resulting in a Conservative majority government. The New Democratic Party formed the official opposition, while the Liberal party was cut to 34 seats and the Bloc Québécois to four seats.

==== Late 2011 ====
After the election further details were leaked, including more schedule delays beyond the CF-18's retirement. In late 2011, it was revealed that the F-35 would not be able to communicate via the Canadian Forces satellite communications network used in the Canadian Arctic. This deficiency is expected to be addressed in the fourth production phase in 2019, or perhaps later. The RCAF was considering whether a stop-gap solution, such as an external communications pod could be fitted to the F-35.

On 15 June 2011, Assistant Deputy Minister for National Defence (Materiel) Dan Ross mistakenly testified to Parliament that the F-35A's development had already been completed.

In November 2011, The Canadian Press released several access-to-information request responses on the procurement. DND documents indicate that 65 aircraft represent the absolute minimum number; this did not include any attrition aircraft. An Air Force Association of Canada source said that this was done to minimize the total purchase price. The reports also noted that delivery plans indicate that the F-35s would be delivered at the same time that the CF-18s are to retire, leaving no room for delays. Chief of Defence Staff General Walter Natynczyk confirmed on 3 November 2011 in addressing the House of Commons Standing Committee on National Defence that 65 is the "bare minimum number" needed.

Government officials confirmed that delays had been accounted for. Retired Canadian Forces Lieutenant-General George MacDonald, who has worked as a consultant at Lockheed Martin, said: "this delay eats most of that up. So the risk is still not great for Canada. But it's tighter. The schedule doesn't have the flexibility it used to have." In November, it was announced that initial F-35s deliveries will lack communication systems such as Link 16 or Blue Force Tracking, which allows them to communicate with older aircraft and ground forces, helping to reduce friendly fire incidents. These functions aren't expected until an upgrade program in 2019.

In November, Associate Defence Minister Julian Fantino outlined the government's F-35 plan: "We will purchase the F-35 ... We're part of the crusade. We're not backing down." Roughly one week later, he stated: "There's a plan A, there's a plan B, there's a plan C, there's a plan Z and they're all F-35s." On 13 March 2012, Fantino told the Commons Defence Committee that the government had not ruled out backing away from the F-35.

In response to F-35A sales to the USAF and the Royal Air Force at a unit price of US$141–145M each, Fantino said in an interview with L'Actualite that: "We are still talking about it ... Could it be fewer than 65? Maybe." On 3 November 2011, Chief of Defence Staff General Walter Natynczyk stated to the House of Commons Standing Committee on National Defence, "Sixty-five is the minimal operational requirement for us. We need to have these aircraft, both for the sovereignty of Canada and to meet our international obligations." Fantino refused to elaborate on the interview when asked in the Commons on 12 December 2011; the opposition said Fantino's remarks showed that the government's insistence on a lower price of US$75M per aircraft was wrong. The NDP military procurement critic Matthew Kellway stated: "It's an acknowledgment that they can't get the plane for the number that they said they could. I think just about everybody else in the world has acknowledged that that's the case."

In December 2011, Defence Research and Development Canada predicted a 54% chance of losing aircraft to the point of having only 63 in service at the time last one is delivered.

=== 2012 ===
==== February 2012 ====
By February 2012, mounting delays and increasing costs resulted in the government reconsidering how many aircraft can be affordably bought. The US government's latest budget documents included buying 29 F-35s in fiscal year 2013 for US$9.17B

On 9 February 2012, Associate Minister of Defence Julian Fantino called a journal article, written by Dr. Michael Byers of the University of British Columbia and by the Salt Spring Forum's Research Associate, Stewart Webb, on the F-35 purchase: "critical of everything that is holy and decent about the government's efforts". Byers and Webb responded to Fantino via Embassy magazine, stating: "Thanks to the introduction of faith-based procurement, the Harper government can now ignore the complexities and inefficiencies of design specifications, equipment testing, contract tendering, specified industrial regional benefits, etc. From now on, decisions on new equipment for the Canadian Forces will be divinely ordained, and channelled to Canadians through Mr. Fantino's divine connections ... it occurred to us that cows, and other things, are sometimes referred to as holy. Especially by people, like Mr. Fantino, who are prone to missteps."

In an interview with Evan Solomon on CBC's Power & Politics on 13 February 2012, Fantino explained: "I think Canada ... has to be very much plugged in to the environment, the economics of the day if you will, but we remain committed to ensuring that we purchase or we acquire the best resources for our men and women, and also at the very same time address the absolute certainty that Canada, Canadian taxpayers will receive the best possible outcome." Fantino confirmed that Canada will host a meeting at the Canadian embassy in Washington in March 2012 where the F-35 partner nations can "deal with misinformation, miscommunication and a whole lot of other misunderstandings with respect to this aircraft."

NDP MP Peter Julian pronounced the F-35 a "fiasco ... $30-billion boondoggle ... They botched this file from the beginning to the end and they need to come clean with Canadian taxpayers." NDP MP Brian Masse, indicated that the government's assertion that the purchase is on track is a "fantasy." Interim Liberal Leader Bob Rae said: "the deal is now a different deal than the one that we thought we originally had so clearly there's a problem. This is a government that is targeting Old Age Security because they say that's unsustainable. But when it comes to a jet contract whose ultimate price we do not know, how many planes we do not know, its affordability we do not know, they say, 'Oh that, that is sacrosanct. So clearly they've made their priorities."

The news media and editorial writers provided analysis and comment on the government's use of rote speeches and obscuring jargon on the issue. Toronto Star national affairs columnist Tim Harper indicated a "Plan B" to the F-35 was inevitable: "the price tag Ottawa has placed on the planes —$16 billion — was surely conjured by Aesop and its insistence on delivery dates had to be penned by the Brothers Grimm. The bargain bulk buying price that was quoted because the plane would be in "peak production" starting in 2016 is gone. The US estimate is almost double the cost per plane. There were ever only two guarantees associated with this untendered deal — cost overruns and production delays. There should now be a third guarantee. This government will drastically reduce the size of this deal — why 65? — or seek to extend the life of the CF-18s or both ... They may stick it in the federal budget in the name of austerity, or they may release the decision under cover of Friday evening darkness."

The National Post's John Ivison reported on 14 February 2012 that the Harper cabinet had discussed cutting the F-35 buy and ordering armed UAVs instead, although the military dismissed drone replacements. Ivison indicated that a likely outcome of an aerospace industry review by former industry minister David Emerson is the purchase of a combination of Boeing F-18E Super Hornets and UAVs, terming the F-35 "a political millstone". On 15 February 2012, Fantino dismissed reports of UAVs covering a shortfall in F-35s as "speculation" and refused to state how many F-35s Canada would buy, what the cost would be or when they would be delivered. Liberal Leader Bob Rae responded: "The prime minister said that the government is going to live within its $9.5 billion budget. (Chief of Defence Staff Gen. Walter) Natyncyzk said they need at least 65 planes, and that is a minimum number. Now Lockheed has said that the price is going to be far higher than the original $75 million. These are three things that just do not go together."

==== March 2012 ====
A meeting of F-35 partners was held at the Canadian Embassy in Washington on 1–2 March 2012, hosted by Canadian Associate Minister of Defence Julian Fantino. Fantino described the meeting as confirming that the F-35 is progressing and that all partners remain committed to its procurement: "While good progress continues to be made, we will always be vigilant with our stewardship of taxpayers' hard earned dollars."

By mid March, the government's tone about the F-35 buy shifted. On 13 March 2012, Fantino stated before the House of Commons Defence Committee, "We have not as yet discounted ... backing out of any of the program ... One of the things that I know for certain is that Canada remains involved in the joint strike fighter program ... The decision, the determinate decision, has not as yet been made as to whether or not we are going to actually purchase, buy, acquire, the F-35." Fantino confirmed that senior defence department officials is examining alternatives to the F-35. The CBC's Laura Payton wrote, "Fantino's comments mark a change in tone from previous answers to questions about the possibility of rising costs and design problems with the Lockheed Martin fighter jets. He had previously left no possibility the government is exploring other options or considering pulling out of the agreement with allies like the United States, Norway, Italy and Australia."

Interim Liberal Leader Bob Rae responded to the government's statements: "Inevitably, they'll have to find a new model, because the F-35 model doesn't work for Canada. What obviously happened in Washington was that Lockheed Martin made it crystal clear that this is not a $75-million buy. And even though the prime minister said months ago that Canada had a firm, firm contract at $75 million, what Mr. Fantino is saying today is completely different: There is no contract, it's not a matter of when but if and when." NDP defence critic David Christopherson stated that Fantino's remarks illustrated that the Conservative government previous dismissal of criticism as unpatriotic has been "all bluster and the reason they suggest it's maybe unpatriotic is because they don't have solid answers to give. They're in serious trouble here. This program is not working, it's not flying. Literally, it's not flying." The Globe and Mail columnist Campbell Clark accused Fantino of carrying out a "classic tactical manoeuvre: the quarter-turn retreat ... the Harper government is committed to the F-35 Joint Strike Fighter, but not so much that it's necessarily going to buy the things. Mr. Fantino's definition of commitment would make a marriage counsellor blush."

On 15 March 2012, media reports were released about an upcoming Auditor General of Canada report that concludes that the DND misled Parliament about the costs of the F-35. National Post columnist John Ivison noted the Department's long history of intentionally underestimating costs in order to get desired equipment and predicted the report will contribute to the cancellation of the F-35 acquisition. Ivison stated, "the fall-out in Parliament may persuade the government the price of sticking with the F-35 program is no longer worth paying". Indications are that the Auditor General's highly critical report was behind the governments' sudden change in stance on the F-35. Senior government officials had warned the Harper government to leave room to exit the program, but were ignored as the F-35 became a central feature of the 2011 election campaign. Liberal defence critic John McKay stated, "It does speak to the issue of the military's ability to snowball politicians ... this is a government that basically snookered themselves by wrapping themselves in the military's flag so they can no longer critique the military." Retired Defence Assistant Deputy Minister Matériel Alan Williams said, "this is the first case that I can recall of a clear and unambiguous hijacking of the process." The news of the upcoming Auditor General's report led to media prediction that the procurement would be frozen, although aerospace and defence industry experts expected the deal will be cancelled in favour of an open competition.

On 26 March 2012, the Canadian Broadcasting Corporation program Power & Politics host Evan Solomon reported that he had seen the unpublished original operational requirements statement for the new fighter, and that the F-35 failed to meet one requirement. Questions were also asked about the statement of operational requirements, how it was written only weeks ahead of the defence minister's public announcement of the F-35 purchase. Former assistant deputy defence minister Alan Williams stated that proper procedures were not followed: "not only is it not normal, but it's a complete hijacking and rigging of the process. In 2006, the military and civilians recommended the F-35 to the minister and four years later, they developed their requirements, obviously rigged or wired to ensure that the only jet to meet the requirements would be the one that they recommended four years earlier." The requirement in question seemed to be written to require the promised Helmet mounted display and AN/AAQ-37 electro-optical Distributed Aperture System (DAS) of the F-35, which are now failing to perform to this spec. The new NDP leader Thomas Mulcair said the documents reported by the CBC indicated that the government created a "bogus bidding process" to hide that it had already chosen the F-35 before the requirements had even been written. Mulcair stated, "They tried to rig the process by defining something that only one plane could meet. It's a very old strategy in government procurement, but even there we're now finding out the F-35 doesn't meet the bogus requirements that they were setting out in their rigged bid. They're bringing us down a corridor that can only result in one thing, the purchase of that one [plane] because their next argument is going to be 15 years later we can't start changing our mind."

Documents obtained by the Ottawa Citizen showed that DND officials met more with Lockheed Martin representatives than all other competitors combined and the meetings with competitors were "pro-forma" to simply show that they had met. University of Calgary Director of the Centre for Military and Strategic Studies, David Bercuson, stated "there never really was a competition". The rigging accusation was taken up by opposition MPs in the Commons on 27 March 2012. NDP MP Matthew Kellway indicated that the government had tabled a response to an order paper stating that F-35 currently met all of the military's stated requirements. Kellway asked, "Which document is the truth? The one for public consumption or the one kept secret?". Fantino's answer was "We will remain committed to the Joint Strike Fighter program ... a contract has not been signed for a replacement aircraft and we will make sure that the air force and the men and women there have the necessary tools to do their job and that's the bottom line."

Prime Minister Stephen Harper stated that "we haven't yet signed a contract, as you know, we retain that flexibility but we are committed to continuing our aerospace sector's participation in the development of the F-35." On 28 March 2012, Harper gave assurances that even if the government decides not to buy any F-35s, Canada would remain an F-35 industrial participant to guarantee that work would continue to come to Canadian companies. By March 2012, 66 Canadian companies had won C$435M in F-35 contracts against a federal government investment of C$278M. Interim Liberal Leader Bob Rae said that the government appeared to be considering alternatives to the F-35 and this should be made public: "There's obviously been a shift in position in the last several weeks."

==== April 2012 ====
On 3 April 2012, the Auditor General of Canada heavily criticized the F-35 procurement in his spring report, which stated that the government did not run a fair competition, that costs were seriously understated and that decisions were made without required approvals or documentation. The report said, "when National Defence decided to recommend the acquisition of the F-35, it was too involved with the aircraft and the JSF Program to run a fair competition. It applied the rules for standard procurement projects but prepared key documents and took key steps out of proper sequence. As a result, the process was inefficient and not managed well. Key decisions were made without required approvals or supporting documentation ... National Defence did not exercise the diligence that would be expected in managing a $25-billion commitment. It is important that a purchase of this size be managed rigorously and transparently."

As a result of the report, the government announced it would strip the DND of responsibility for the project and give it to a new special secretariat of deputy ministers that will be part of the Public Works and Government Services Canada. The Treasury Board will also be involved and will review all DND documents to improve accuracy and oversight. Associate Defence Minister Julian Fantino confirmed that the government will also study alternatives to the F-35. Treasury Board will commission an independent review, including all assumptions made, along with potential costs. The review will be made public when complete. Furthermore, Rona Ambrose, the minister responsible for Public Works and Government Services Canada, stated "Funding will remain frozen and Canada will not purchase new aircraft until further due diligence, oversight and transparency is applied to the process of replacing the Canadian Forces' aging CF-18 fleet".

The opposition responded quickly to the Auditor General's report. Marc Garneau, the Liberal Party's Industry, Science, and Technology critic, said "The government will do an enormous amount of spin today and say that they were misled by [Defence Department] officials, it wasn't their fault, and now they're going to take action. There is no question that the generals ... wanted the F-35 and drove everything towards that. But that doesn't excuse the minister of national defence and the prime minister for buying it, hook, line and sinker, without then doing their own due diligence." Interim Liberal leader Bob Rae argued that Harper was responsible: "Any company that made a mistake of this kind, that misled its shareholders, that misled the public, that put out a misleading prospectus, that published false figures and false documents to the tune of billions of dollars, any company that did those things would fire the CEO and replace the board of directors." Rae indicated that Liberal Party research showed trouble in 2010: "The numbers did not add up. The numbers were not real numbers ... [Harper] called us liars. He said we were unpatriotic. He cannot now pretend that he was just the piano player in the brothel who didn't have a clue as to what was really going on upstairs." Rae called on Harper to resign for deliberately misleading Parliament and lying to Canadians and concluded: "Stephen Harper is not fit to be the Prime Minister of Canada".

Matthew Kellway, NDP military procurement critic said "They still have a lot of explaining to do for the auditor general's report and we will keep asking them for explanations for, for example, the $10 billion that suddenly was left out of the department's estimates for the F-35. All I can say is that it's hard to [say], in light of all the information in the media, all the information coming out of various accountability offices in the United States, that they weren't aware. But I think we're left with basically a binary alternative here. Either they were aware and they deliberately misled Canadians or they weren't aware and we have a negligence and competence issue with this government." Conservative MP Chris Alexander, parliamentary secretary to Defence Minister Peter MacKay, blamed the media for the scandal: "In the media, there has been a consistent effort to mislead people, to imply that money has been spent. It hasn't yet."

The media also reacted, referring to the "F-35 scandal" and "the F-35 fiasco". Ottawa Citizen columnist Michael Den Tandt wrote: "Here's what a sober-minded, fiscally responsible and cautious prime minister would do, given the outrageous chronicle of incompetence, stupidity and duplicity revealed by Auditor General Michael Ferguson's report on the F-35 fighter program: He would demand and receive the resignation of Chief of the Defence Staff Walter Natynczyk. He would demand and receive the resignation of Defence Minister Peter MacKay." CBC News reporter Brian Stewart stated that the events indicate infighting between DND and the government, dominated by a culture of secrecy and intimidation. The Globe and Mail's John Ibbitson indicated that the Harper government had "bungled the biggest and most important contract on its watch". He added that for a "Prime Minister who practically branded criticism of the F-35 acquisition as treasonous must now deeply regret, and will have to eat, his words." Andrew Coyne of the National Post said "a fiasco from top to bottom, combining lapses of professional ethics, ministerial responsibility and democratic accountability into one spectacular illustration of how completely our system of government has gone to hell".

On 5 April 2012, Auditor General Michael Ferguson stated before the House of Commons Defence Committee that, based on his investigation, that the government would have known that the F-35 cost estimate was C$25B at the time that the DND told Parliament it was C$14.7B, weeks prior to the May 2011 federal election, but not say whether he believed the government intentionally misled Parliament. Harper and other ministers refused to answer any opposition questions regarding when they knew that the DND had estimated the program cost would be C$25 billion.

Interim Liberal leader Bob Rae responded to this revelation: "if they did, then we have a real problem because then that means that they were effectively misleading Parliament for many, many, many months. Misleading the people of Canada throughout the last election." Rae also raised a question of privilege in the Commons over the government's statement that they accept the Auditor General's recommendations, but not his conclusions, asserting that if the government accepts Ferguson's report, then it accepts the fact that it misled Parliament. Government House leader Peter Van Loan disagreed with Rae's position: "the position of the government is not the position taken by the officials in those departments." NDP Leader Thomas Mulcair, in a speech to the Economic Club of Canada, said: "we have clear and convincing evidence that the government intentionally provided false information to Parliament and that's serious. This is a basic question of respect of our institutions." NDP military procurement critic Matthew Kellway said: "what's just been uncovered and revealed is political fraud at the core of this government ... This is a matter of knowing the cost estimates and failing to tell Canadians what those cost estimates were and, in fact, approving information going out that was knowingly false." DND officials indicated that failures lie with the Defence Minister Peter MacKay and Associate Minister Julian Fantino, that both had given contradictory messages about competitions, costs, and made claims that did not hold up under scrutiny.

Press reaction to the Auditor General's statements was swift. Michael Den Tandt of the Ottawa Citizen wrote that if the Auditor General's report is "true then [Harper's government] will have no defenders, anywhere ... The government itself will be discredited. There is no moving on from a lie this big." CBC political commentator Rex Murphy called Defence Minister Peter MacKay "a seat warmer with status" and indicated he must resign. Peter Wothington, writing in the Toronto Sun said "the monkey business over Canada committing (sort of) to the hugely expensive F-35s without competitive bids as 'the only acceptable plane,' stinks to high heaven. If it's the 'only acceptable plane,' what's to fear from competitive bids?"

On 8 April, on the CTV program Question Period Defence Minister Peter MacKay indicated that the change in public figures of C$10B was "a different interpretation in the all-up costs" and refused to resign. MacKay also warned that, while Canada could stop the purchase without losing any money at this point, cancelling the existing memorandum of understanding would mean losing Canada's place on the production run and thus delaying the CF-18's replacement. NDP MP Jack Harris said "They can't paper this over. This is going to haunt them". Liberal MP Ralph Goodale agreed with Harris stating, "There's no way Mr. MacKay can explain this away. And quite frankly this buck doesn't stop with Mr. MacKay ... It is the prime minister who knew every minute detail of this file." In arguing that operating costs should not be included MacKay cited the Auditor General's report that he stated showed that Parliamentary Budget Officer Kevin Page had also left the F-35's operating costs out. MacKay was mistaken and actually cited the DND's own accounting in the Auditor General's report by mistake and not Page's. The DND had actually removed the operating costs for its lower estimate, while Page included them in his own $14-billion number. Liberal Defence critic Marc Garneau labelled MacKay incompetent: "It's very disturbing ... I had to go to the question of, 'is he trying to pull a quick one on us again, hoping the general public is not going to see this?' Or is he not too bright? It went through my mind, I have to admit."

On 9 April 2012, Chief of Defence Staff General Walter Natynczyk endorsed the F-35 purchase during a ceremony at Vimy Ridge and claimed that he was always honest on the F-35's costs. Winslow Wheeler, of the Centre for Defence Information indicated that the money issue is just a small part of the story and that the press has been ignoring that the aircraft will not perform the missions asked of it and focused on its lack of stealth capabilities, inability to defend itself and inability to fill the fighter role. Retired Assistant Deputy Minister of National Defence (Matériel) Alan Williams raised the issue that the departmental cost estimates were set at 20 years instead of the planned lifespan of 36 years, thus reducing the costs for replacement aircraft and mid-life upgrades. Williams said "That's a known distortion. If you have as your intent to be as open as possible, you don't do that. Williams also accused the government of secretly intending to buy 79 F-35s instead of the planned 65 and splitting the purchase to hide the costs.

On 10 April 2012, an editorial in the Ottawa Citizen agreed that the costing can plausibly be made to include or exclude a myriad of factors, but concluded "the government must still explain its benefits to Canadians. What jobs will it create in Canada? What are the risks that the price of the F-35 will be more than Canada can afford? What is our plan if that happens? All these points must be addressed with factual analysis, not assertions. The F-35 controversy proves, not for the first time, that full and honest disclosure is preferable to editing the facts down to what government thinks people need to know. The downside of managing the truth is that, when you finally tell it, people just won't believe you."

On 14 April 2012, opposition members of the House of Commons public accounts committee commenced action to recall the committee to examine the Auditor General's report. The government indicated that it welcomed a public review. On 18 April 2012, the Conservatives used their majority on the committee to prevent the calling of critical witnesses, resulting in opposition accusations of a cover-up. Liberal MP Gerry Byrne said, "This exposes that they have no intentions of actually operating in a transparent and accountable way. They'll hold meetings in secret. They won't allow officials to appear before us. They will do everything to prevent the truth from being heard." NDP MP Malcolm Allen said, "this is about trying to control the message. Which members of the executive of this government knew what and when? From my perspective, we're not headed down a good road. What would be more humiliating and more embarrassing to them is the testimony from the witnesses that I proposed. They will do anything and everything to cover this up."

Defence Minister MacKay claimed that the Auditor General and the DND merely disagreed on what to include in the F-35's life cycle costs. The National Post's Andrew Coyne pointed out that DND had agreed with the Auditor General in 2010, after a similar dispute on the Sikorsky CH-148 Cyclone, that all life cycle costs be included in future reports: "once that claim is knocked down — that this was all just a dispute over accounting — there is no escape. The government knowingly misrepresented the true costs of the F-35 ... It knew how it was supposed to account for these, under Treasury Board rules, under the Auditor-General's recommendation, and by its own publicly stated agreement with both ... It simply chose to tell a different story to Parliament and the public ... This isn't about the planes, in other words, or costs, or accounting. This is about accountability. This is about whether departments are answerable to their ministers, and whether ministers are answerable to Parliament — or whether billions of public dollars can be appropriated without the informed consent of either Parliament or the public ... And it is about whether we, as citizens, are prepared to pay attention, and hold people in power to account when they lie to us. Which is to say, it is about whether we live in a functioning Parliamentary democracy, or want to."

On 25 April 2012, retired air force Colonel Paul Maillet, an aeronautical engineer and former CF-18 fleet manager at National Defence Headquarters spoke out against the F-35, indicating it was unsuitable for Canadian service: "How do you get a single-engine, low-range, low-payload, low-manoeuvrability aircraft that is being optimized for close air support ... to operate effectively in the North?" He also noted that it will obsolete soon due to UAV technology advances and suggested that the F-18E/F Super Hornet, or CF-18 life extensions, and buying UAVs would be a better choice. Jay Paxton, spokesman for Defence Minister Peter MacKay, dismissed Maillet's comments: "the goal of this failed candidate is to promote a political party without a care for the future of our nation."

On 26 April 2012, an access to information request revealed that Deputy Defence Minister Robert Fonberg had briefed Fantino about the F-35's cost and schedule problems at the same time that Fantino was publicly saying that these items were not issues. On 28 April 2012, Parliamentary Budget Officer Kevin Page was interviewed on the CBC Radio program The House and indicated that the government appeared to have two sets of books on the F-35 project, one for internal use with higher estimates and one for public consumption with lower numbers. Page also indicated that due to soaring prices, the government would only afford 40–45 F-35, not the minimum 65 required. The US Government Accountability Office (GAO) stated that each F-35 cost US$137M in 2012.

==== May 2012 ====
In May 2012, the newly created interdepartmental secretariat charged with overseeing the fighter acquisition indicated that the DND should, on its own volition start from scratch with a complete assessment of alternatives. An unnamed senior official said, "If the military were smart, they would do it themselves, unsolicited. There seems to be an overwhelming public appetite to ask why [the government is] asking for this capability, and to be involved in a consideration of whether we should continue." On 2 May 2012, the Public Works Minister, Rona Ambrose confirmed that the name of the secretariat had been changed to eliminate the impression of bias in the selection, changing from "F-35 Secretariat" to "National Fighter Procurement Secretariat".

In May 2012, former Assistant Deputy Minister of Defence Alan Williams released a book, entitled Canada, Democracy and The F-35, which explained how the process was run backwards, picking the aircraft first and then creating requirements to justify the choice. Williams also accused the government of repeated lies on the F-35, contending that routine government statements were false, including that "there was a competition in 2001, so there is no need to conduct another one. Canada needs the F-35 because of the industrial and regional benefits. The government was just continuing along the lines established by the previous Liberal government. The F-35 is the best aircraft at the best price. The F-35 will cost the U.S. $75 million."

On 14 May 2012, an annual planning report for the F-35 program was presented to the House of Commons by Treasury Board President Tony Clement which clearly indicated that the government was still not considering any alternatives and expected delivery of the first example in 2017, a year later than previously forecast. This was despite the fact that both the Defence Minister and Associate Defence Minister had asserted that no decision to procure it had been made.

On 15 May 2012, in response to confusing and contradictory information provided by officials at the DND in response to parliamentary committee hearings into the F-35 affair, opposition parliamentary committee members declared that they had lost confidence in the department. NDP MP Malcolm Allen stated. "There's no faith in this department anymore. None whatsoever ... This is a department that's really gone rogue. [Defence Minister Peter MacKay] has totally lost control of that department. If the officials in the Defence Department are actually misleading the committee and misleading Parliament then I guess they ought to be gone. You can't have folks at that level misleading the committee and misleading Parliament ..."

On 24 May 2012, Lockheed Martin issued a statement that if Canada does not buy the F-35 then Canadian companies will not get future contracts. Lockheed Martin Vice President Steve O'Bryan said, "right now we will honour all existing contracts that we have. After that, all F-35 work will be directed into countries that are buying the airplane." O'Bryan also indicated that Canada was buying the F-35, despite the government indicating that the purchase was being reconsidered: "What we have is the official statement out of the government and we're working with the government. They're committed to the F-35, they've selected it, and we haven't had any change in that official position".

On 17 May 2012, the Conservative majority in the public accounts committee, led by Conservative MP Andrew Saxton, moved to stop calling witnesses and have the panel prepare its report on the auditor general's findings of the F-35 procurement. Committee member Liberal MP Gerry Byrne, said: "The government wants to shut this down, and for good reason. They are very afraid of what is going to come out." Byrne faced possible punishment from the committee for relating an in camera meeting, which parliamentary rules prohibit.

==== June 2012 ====
In June 2012, emails were released, showing that the DND knew in 2011 that the F-35 deliveries would not be completed until after the CF-18 was required to be retired, contradicting the Conservative government's assertions that a stop gap measure would not be needed. Life extensions for the CF-18 fleet had been previously rejected as too expensive. Also associate defence minister Julian Fantino revealed that the mandatory requirements for the replacement aircraft included "stealth, secure data link communications, visual operation in no-light conditions and automatic data and sensors information sharing", all areas in which the F-35 is supposed to excel in.

==== August 2012 ====
In August 2012, a tender for an independent auditor had not been filled, reportedly due to the tender not permitting sub-contracting. An amended tender was re-issued on 8 August 2012; Amber Irwin, a spokeswoman for Public Works Minister Rona Ambrose, explained, "This request for proposals (RFP) issued today will ensure that this independent review is done properly and supersedes the previous one issued. The requirements of the RFP have been broadened to ensure qualified bidders can fulfil the task required by the government ... The National Fighter Procurement Secretariat is committed to getting this done right and in a timely manner." New Democratic Party procurement critic Matthew Kellway labelled the delays as "absurd", and said, "this is a process that is out of control. The government has gone to great lengths and jumped over a lot of hurdles, likely at tremendous cost to Canadians, to avoid releasing numbers that are being produced by the Joint Strike Fighter Program office."

As the government blocked opposition members of the House Defence Committee to call certain witnesses via termination of debate, members of the NDP decided to hold separate hearings on Parliament Hill on 21 August 2012. NDP defence critic Jack Harris explained: "we will be referring to the testimony that was given here today. We will [sic] using that to reinforce the arguments that this government is not doing the right thing". The meeting heard from retired US defence auditor Winslow Wheeler, former Canadian Associate Deputy Minister of Defence Alan Williams, University of Ottawa defence procurement expert Philippe Lagasse and defence writer Scott Taylor; all four were critical of the procurement process and the F-35 selection. Wheeler stated "The F-35 is only 25 per cent through its flight test program ... [it] won't be finished until 2019. Anybody, including my country, who buys this airplane before then, is a fool because you don't know what you're getting in terms of performance. And you don't know what you're getting in terms of cost."

In August, Steve O'Bryan, Lockheed Martin Vice-President, stated that the firm planned to deliver 65 F-35s to Canada. The parliamentary secretary to Minister of National Defence Peter MacKay, Chris Alexander, stated that the government had never announced it would buy the F-35 and accused opposition parties of starting rumours to cause confusion; despite repeated announcements by Prime Minister Stephen Harper, MacKay and other senior officials stating the purchase in 2010. Philippe Lagasse, a defence expert at the University of Ottawa, explained: "Governments do this all the time, and it's totally understandable that they would try to change the conversation. The problem is there's so much public evidence, that really you're inviting mockery."

==== September 2012 ====
In September 2012, KPMG was selected to audit the independent cost review of Canada's F-35 acquisition at a cost of C$643,535. Also that month the National Defence revealed that its CF-18 pilots have been shutting down one of the two engines almost once a month for the past twenty years, raising additional questions about the safe operations of a single engine fighter.

On 28 September 2012, the Canadian Broadcasting Corporation aired an investigative report on The Fifth Estate that provided evidence that the DND failed to seriously consider alternatives and had taken US evaluations of competitors at face value. The former Canadian chief of the air staff, Lieutenant-General Steve Lucas, commented that there had not been a competition, as it conflicted with Canada's participation in the F-35 program. Ottawa defence analyst Steven Staples also indicated that the 2010 announcement of Canada's F-35 purchase was intended to give Lockheed Martin good news amid development troubles. Former Pentagon aircraft designer Pierre Sprey expressed the expectation that unit prices would continue to rise and reach in excess of US$200M.

==== October 2012 ====
The Public Works and Government Services Canada issued a RFP for a firm to review the purchase decision on 26 October 2012. The chosen company will receive a contract in December 2012 to review factors under the existing seven-point action plan. The contractor will "determine whether the shortcomings the Auditor General identified in the acquisition process have been addressed; confirm whether the steps taken in the acquisition process for the period up to June 2012 were in accordance with government policies, procedures and regulations; and provide lessons learned and propose recommendations for changes, if any, to current practices and policies for acquisitions of a similar nature".

Despite the apparent copying of the F-35 in the Chinese Shenyang J-31, NDP MP Matthew Kellway said that since Canada would never oppose China, there was no need for Canada to have advanced fighters.

==== November 2012 ====
On 21 November 2012, the public accounts committee presented its final F-35 report. The report cited the DND for poor procurement handling, without further explanation or blame; and called for future transparency and accountability. Opposition politicians called the report, crafted by a Conservative-majority committee, a whitewash. NDP MP Malcolm Allen said, "When you compare the final [committee] report to the auditor general's report, it's nothing but one great big whitewash. We were hoping to see that Canadians would really find out the whole truth of what actually transpired and this government would then take responsibility for its actions on this file." The Canadian Press found that the most pointed comments of Page and Ferguson were deleted or softened in the final report. The National Post noted, "There have been allegations the Harper government remains committed to buying the F-35 despite its insistence that other possible replacements for the country's CF-18 fighters are being considered. Those concerns were bolstered over the weekend when Defence Minister Peter MacKay refused to say whether the government is actually looking at other options."

In late November, it was decided to put aside the statement of requirements to conduct an options analysis, including dialogue with nations purchasing the F-35. General Thomas J. Lawson, Canada's Chief of the Defence Staff, has admitted the partial stealth features offered by competing "4.5th generation" fighters would also be sufficient to meet Canada's needs.

==== December 2012 ====
In December 2012, it was revealed that Prime Minister Harper and the cabinet had been kept up to date on the F-35's various problems, delays, and cost overruns, even as Harper had been painting a rosy picture leading up to the election.

On 6 December, the Ottawa Citizen ran a front page headline, Federal government cancels F-35 fighter purchase, and indicated that the pending KPMG report had placed program costs at $44.8B, that the Cabinet operations committee had decided to cancel the purchase and hold a competition. The Prime Minister's Office responded, saying that the F-35 buy was not cancelled and calling the story "inaccurate". The National Post reported that the KPMG report put the full program cost at $45,802,000,000 over 42 years, double the amount previously publicized by the government, and that the US government was alarmed by media claims of cancellation. Another factor noted in news sources and in questions from parliament was the lack of guaranteed purchases of Canadian products as part of the deal, unlike most military aircraft deals. Canada will incur costs whether it stays in the F-35 program or not as the government will be required to invest more in May 2013 or else attract penalties if it withdraws from industrial participation. The Ottawa Citizen also reported that the KPMG report's timing was critical with regard to the 2012 US elections: "The PM (Stephen Harper) didn't want it to become a (U.S.) election issue and therefore hurt Canada-U.S. relations."

Interim Liberal Leader Bob Rae called for the Defence Minister MacKay's resignation: "I don't see how the minister of defence can possibly continue in his job ... He's basically been a sales spokesperson for Lockheed Martin ... He's denigrated and attacked every person in opposition, in the Liberal Party or elsewhere, who has ever raised concerns or questions about this ... The government has consistently misled Canadians about the true cost of this aircraft ... about their degree of oversight and their readiness to deal with the situation". Liberal defence critic John McKay also called for the Defence Minister to resign: "He's already been half fired by the prime minister. He's not responsible for procurement any longer." A spokesman for the Prime Minister responded to such calls: "Not going to happen". NDP defence critic Jack Harris stated "The whole process is in a shambles ... We've got enough misleading information out there ... They didn't do their due diligence, they didn't have an open, fair and transparent process. They've demonstrated their incompetence in a $40-billion-plus contract." Postmedia News's Andrew Coyne said: "It is difficult to imagine how a worse mess could have been made of the F-35 procurement ... culpable incompetence, mixed with deliberate misrepresentation. What started with a catastrophic failure of oversight, progressed through many months of dishonesty, secrecy, and stonewalling, culminating in what can only be called electoral fraud — followed by still more dishonesty about everything that had gone before."

The government appointed an independent panel to consider the topic of a new fighter for Canada over a period of three months. The panel consisted of: Philippe Lagassé, assistant professor of public and international affairs at the University of Ottawa and critic of the F-35 procurement; James Mitchell of consulting firm Sussex Circle, a retired senior civil servant with cabinet and the Treasury Board; Keith Coulter, former head of the Communications Security Establishment, former fighter pilot who commanded a CF-18 squadron and former member of the Snowbirds; Rod Monette, former federal comptroller-general and DND chartered accountant. The government also quietly informed aerospace industry principals that they should expect a full competition to follow the analysis of options.

The government released the KPMG report on 12 December 2012, which projected a lifetime cost at C$45.8 billion over 42 years and showed that the estimated cost to both purchase and provide needed upgrades and infrastructure was included the government's $9 billion figure given previously, although it did not include operating costs. Also, in order to keep the purchase under $9 billion, the new estimate eliminated the requirement to be compatible with Canadian refueling aircraft and expenditures on infrastructure and ammunition were reduced. The industrial offsets report, also released on 12 December 2012, showed that the best estimate of potential benefits to Canadian industry would be C$9.8 billion, far below the C$45.8 billion the government was forecast to spend. The report also said that the government would be expected to pay $92M per aircraft, not the $75M that Harper had said was guaranteed.

Public Works Minister Rona Ambrose stated the government's acceptance of the Auditor General's report. Defence Minister Peter MacKay said the program had been "reset". Officials confirmed that sole sourced F-35 buy was off the table and that all fighters in, or close to, production would be considered for the CF-18 replacement. The Eurofighter Typhoon and the Super Hornet were specifically named, while the Dassault Rafale and Saab Gripen may also be considered. Other manufacturers indicated they will not provide data to Canada without a full competition. Officials also confirmed that CF-18 life extensions were under analysis. NDP MP Jack Harris responded: "This is a charade ... They're not going to put it out to a fair and transparent public tendering process".

Defence Minister Peter MacKay was asked if he regretted his previous harsh language used against critics who turned out to be right in their assessments, MacKay described himself as being "passionate" regarding military procurement priorities.

The Ottawa Citizen published an editorial by Andrew Coyne on 12 December 2012 entitled Tories refuse, even now, to come clean on F-35 costs, detailing how the government continued to try to reduce the damaging effects of the costs KPMG revealed. Coyne said, "just to be clear, they're still spinning us ... even with the release of its own specially commissioned independent review by the accounting firm of KPMG, the Conservative government still can't bring itself to tell us the whole truth about the costs of the F-35 ... even if one were inclined to excuse the initial deception, what is really inexcusable is the government's subsequent refusal to back down ... as it did after the Parliamentary Budget Officer's report, as it did after the auditor general's report, as it is doing even today."

In a scathing editorial published by CBC News on 13 December 2012, Brian Stewart termed the F-35 a "global wrecking ball" due to its lack of affordability. He faulted the decision to manufacture the aircraft before flight testing was completed for driving up costs and indicated that the huge cost, including a per aircraft cost of US$167M, would have "strategic consequences" as nations cancel or cut back orders, thus driving up unit costs further. Stewart stated, "America's problems here put Ottawa in a most uncomfortable position as it finds itself wrestling with a fighter option it can't afford with an aerospace giant in decline and likely unable to extend as many economic side benefits as were initially promised ... But given the enormous stakes involved, we can expect immense pressure from the U.S., our closest ally, to not reject this plane before the eyes of the world." He concluded that the F-35 acquisition is a "dank swamp [that] will only grow more terrifying for ministers to contemplate with each passing month".

On 13 December 2012, interim Liberal leader Bob Rae stated: "I think Canadians need to understand how big a screw-up this has been ... I think this is a huge spin operation. One of the things that came out yesterday is the government said the life of the CF-18s is longer than previously thought ... We haven't had a question period for the last six months where [Defence Minister] Peter MacKay has answered a single question about the affair." Former National Defence procurement chief Alan Williams said that the government's focus on stealth is misplaced and what is really needed is an assessment of Canada's actual needs. Opposition critics and inside sources accused the government of refusing a competition and suggested the requirements may be manipulated to only qualify the F-35.

Experts debated what the "reset" of the process would accomplish. Rob Huebert, from the Centre for Military and Strategic Studies, University of Calgary, indicated that the F-35 would be chosen anyway: "what's the alternative? ... You're not going to buy the Russian or Chinese aircraft — that just ties you in to a back lane that you just don't want to go into." Huebert said that the Eurofighter Typhoon is solely an "interceptor", the Saab Gripen is "a bit of a [Cold War] relic", and the Super Hornet a "total colossal waste of money", noted that Australia bought them only as a stopgap measure before the F-35 arrives. Ugarhan Berkok from the Royal Military College of Canada disagreed with Huebert, saying that "multi-function is probably the order of the day"; he indicated that the Typhoon, Rafale, Gripen and Super Hornet all have that capability. Ottawa Citizen columnist Michael Den Tandt called for a cabinet shuffle to remove MacKay as Defence Minister and "a reset of the government itself".

=== 2013 ===
==== Early 2013 ====
A poll conducted by Forum Research in January 2013 found that, while two thirds believed that Harper had misled them, almost half thought the F-35 deal would proceed anyway. NDP MP Matthew Kellway said of the poll: "I think the vast majority of Canadians have seen enough to understand that misleading Canadians is pathological for this government. They suggest that flipping through brochures of other fighter jets—again—is a serious reset of the procurement process. That is arrogant and cynical, it assumes Canadians are gullible and these numbers [in this poll] show that that is clearly a miscalculation." On 21 January 2013, having left his government position, retired Assistant Deputy Minister (Materiel) Dan Ross criticised Harper's culture of secrecy and lack of accountability. On the outcome of the new procurement process, Ross predicted: "At the end of the day, the Royal Canadian Air Force will fly F-35s, if we have an Air Force that flies fighters."

On 25 January 2013, the Canadian National Fighter Procurement Secretariat issued a draft questionnaire to Boeing, Dassault Aviation, EADS, Lockheed Martin, and Saab Group to obtain detailed information on the capabilities of their available fighters. The draft questionnaire seeks detailed information on technical capabilities of fighters in, or close to, production. Public Works indicated that these other fighters might only be used as a stop gap solution until the F-35 was ready. Each of the four companies received the same 15 page survey asking for suggestions, but not detailed pricing information. Critics and one of the manufacturers of an alternative fighter called the Public Works activity a market analysis of the fighters that did not probe deeply into Canada's actual needs.

In February 2013, retired Air Force Colonel Paul Maillet, who had previously worked on fighter procurement, reacted to an announcement of a reduction in the budget for weapons in the F-35 program estimates. He noted that since the aircraft will still require bombs and missiles, these would be moved into other funding projects, a violation of normal cost accounting procedures. Maillet suggested that if adequate stocks of weapons were not purchased, then the F-35 would be relegated to a surveillance role.

In February, Boeing launched a campaign to convince Canada to buy the Boeing Super Hornet instead of the F-35, promoting it on the basis that the overall cost of ownership would be half that of the F-35, even though the Super Hornet has two engines. The Conservative government opened the door for plans to extend the useful lives of the existing CF-18 fleet.

By March, observers were noting that the F-35 buy had become an object of national ridicule. Due to its lack of IFR capability and inability to be operated in cold weather as well as issues with helmet design, cockpit design, radar and other factors, Maclean's columnist Aaron Wherry referred to it as "a joke" and compared it to the Senate of Canada for ineffectiveness. NDP defence critic Matthew Kellway said in the House of Commons, "Mr. Speaker, the Conservatives committed to buying the F-35 multiple times. They told us it is on the right track multiple times. According to the Pentagon, the F-35 needs a heated hangar in Florida, it cannot fly at night, and the pilots stay out of the clouds."

A F-35 advertisement on an OC Transpo bus, in Ottawa

In April 2013, Lockheed Martin announced that the per unit price had risen and was now expected to be US$85M per aircraft. The company also commenced a Canada-wide promotional effort, including a travelling simulator, to convince Canadians that the F-35 should still be purchased. Unusually, the advertising campaign including purchasing large ads on OC Transpo buses in Ottawa.

==== Late 2013 ====
In May 2013, Saab declined to participate in the Canadian government's market analysis for alternatives to the F-35. On 3 June 2013, Saab unexpectedly pulled the JAS 39 Gripen from the competition. Following talks with Canada, Saab decided not to take part as "conditions were not ripe to act", but it may re-enter if conditions changed.

In June 2013, e-mails surfaced that indicated that Canadian diplomats and military personnel had been instructed to downplay the negative impacts of the Auditor General's report a year earlier. They were told to inform allied nations that the criticism of the Auditor General's F-35 purchase was only "bureaucratic" in nature and not a substantive issue, as part of federal government damage-control efforts.

With a decision on the fighter contract delayed until after the next Canadian national election, an over $200 million investment in a new software center that would employ up to 20 Canadian military officials was also on hold.

In August, an independent audit by the accounting firm of Raymond Chabot Grant Thornton forecast a Canadian unit price of $95.2M per aircraft in 2017. By September 2013, the estimated potential lifetime costs of the fleet had grown to $71 billion. Also in September, Lockheed Martin announced that if Canada does not decide to buy the F-35 then Canadian industry would lose $10.5 billion in potential future F-35-related aerospace contracts. Company Executive Vice-President Orlando Carvalho indicated that Lockheed Martin will honour existing contracts with Canadian firms but that future contracts would go to companies in nations that do buy the F-35.

In September 2013, Boeing provided Canada with cost and capability data for its Advanced F/A-18 Super Hornet, suggesting that a fleet of 65 aircraft would cost $1.7 billion less than a fleet of F-35s. The Advanced Super Hornet builds upon the existing Super Hornet, which is derived from the F/A-18 Hornet and an improvement over the current, modernized CF-18 Hornet. The U.S. Navy buys Super Hornets for $52 million per aircraft, while the advanced version would add $6–$10 million per aircraft, depending on options selected.

William D. Hartung, the Director of the Arms and Security Project at the Center for International Policy and the author of Prophets of War: Lockheed Martin and the Making of the Military-Industrial Complex warned Canadians about Lockheed Martin's motives: "Lockheed Martin may make bold promises of Canadian job creation with products like the F-35, but the fact remains, their priority will be keeping their main customer – the U.S. Department of Defense – happy by providing American jobs – even if they are supported by Canadian weapons purchases." Hartung suggested Canada should supported the Arms Trade Treaty which was voted favourably, but not adopted by Canada: "the government would be well advised to aim at controlling the arms industry, rather than investing in defence firms".

=== 2014 ===
==== Early 2014 ====
Dassault Aviation of France launched a marketing campaign to sell Canada the twin-engined, combat proven Dassault Rafale instead of the F-35. Dassault offered to transfer intellectual property and technology, including source codes, and also contractually guarantee industrial offsets in the same amount as the aircraft's contract value.

In April, the "options analysis" of the different fighters available was completed, although the report itself was not made public. An analysis by The Globe and Mail found that, even if a full competition were held, it would "automatically lead to F-35", as the Statement of Requirements (SoR) was written to require its capabilities. Some political observers called the report's commissioning a delaying tactic to keep the F-35 issue out of the next federal election. That month, the first F-35 delivery was delayed again to 2018.

In late April, a report for The Centre for Policy Alternatives and the Rideau Institute by Michael Byers, indicated that government estimates for the F-35 program may underestimate cost by Cdn$12-Cdn$81 billion, depending on different factors taken over the aircraft's 40-year lifespan. Lockheed Martin's vice president of F-35 business development and customer engagement, Steven O'Bryan, indicated that he thought the data used was out of date and suggested that reports like this were intentionally trying to inflate the F-35's price tag. The Ottawa Citizen discovered that pre-publication versions of the December 2012 DND report had questioned the F-35's ability to fulfill Canada's needs, but that these had been removed from the final report which focused only on price.

In June, the government's independent panel on the new fighter released their report; this examined the risks and costs of each possible fighter choice, but did not make a recommendation as to which to buy, leaving that up to the government to decide. Panel member James Mitchell stated: "The purpose of this is not (to) reach conclusions or recommendations but to satisfy ministers that the necessary rigorous analytic work has been done ... fairly and objectively." Alan Williams, the DND's former head of procurement and formerly headed Canada's initial involvement in the F-35 program, dismissed the report as a public relations ploy and argued that an open competition is required. In June, the Canadian Centre for Policy Alternatives released a report entitled "One Dead Pilot," written by Michael Byers, the Canada Research Chair in Global Politics and International Law at the University of British Columbia; it noted that for Canadian operations "the need for a twin-engine fighter jet is very clear ... a single-engine fighter jet would be a serious mistake."

==== Late 2014 ====
In August, Industry Canada released a report that showed that 32 Canadian companies had received US$587M in contracts for work on the F-35 program, an increase of US$83M since 2013.

The Conservative government approved an upgrade to the CF-18 fleet to keep them flying until 2025. Secret defence documents indicated that delay in procuring a new fighter would lead to costly CF-18 life extension work. Analysis indicated that indecision would push back F-35 costs and keep it from being an issue in the upcoming federal election.

In a 27 October briefing to the secretary of the USAF by Lt.-Gen. Chris Bogdan, the F-35 program head at the Pentagon, revealed that Canada will buy four F-35s by swapping their LRIP 9 purchase for four USAF jets in the LRIP 6 batch, formalizing the order in November 2014 and taking delivery in 2015. The government repeatedly denied that a secret purchase had been arranged. NDP defence critic Jack Harris stated it was "outrageous ... going on behind the backs of Canadians after the debacle that we've had with the F-35, keeping everybody in the dark about the price, sole sourcing it after they said they were going to have an open competition ... taking action without the kind of transparency that's required, without the proper debate, without notifying Canadians, without notifying Parliament." Liberal defence critic Joyce Murray asked, "Why is an American general informing us that Canada is set to order four F-35s in the next few weeks? ... Pressing the 'reset' button on the CF-18 replacement clearly hasn't taught the Conservatives a single thing about conducting an open and transparent procurement process." Unnamed government sources claimed that Lockheed Martin had not provided even basic data for such a decision while development issues and unknown costs rule out a quick buy.

By December 2014, a global oil price collapse had reduced the Canadian dollar's value. That factor, plus inflation and increased F-35 costs, resulted in a DND report indicating that the needed 65 F-35s could no longer be bought within the planned budget when contingencies were accounted for. That month, an DND report stated: "it is estimated that seven to 11 aircraft could be lost over the useful life of the fleet and the cost to replace these lost aircraft could be in the order of $1 billion." This cost had not been accounted for before. Another DND report on future fighter operational requirements stated that Canada was "highly unlikely" to engage in first strikes against other nations with sophisticated air defences and there was little operational need for stealth aircraft.

On 10 December 2014, Ottawa Citizen writer Michael Den Tandt criticized Prime Minister Stephen Harper and the F-35 procurement: "He promised the country a renewed, properly equipped, capable military, lo those many years ago, in 2005–06. Old planes are not new planes. And no amount of shifting blame, or dodging or weaving, can obscure that this was simply bungled, almost beyond repair. It is ineptitude, piled upon ineptitude, and bureaucracy, and inertia, driving a lack of progress. These are not, we are told, what the Harper government is supposed to be about. These are not great feats to be defended at election time.

=== 2015 ===
==== September 2015 ====
In September 2015, Michael Byers, Canada Research Chair in Global Politics and International Law at the University of British Columbia wrote an analysis of the F-35 procurement that indicated with the recent loss of value of the Canadian dollar, due to a crash in oil prices, that it was no longer affordable. Byers' calculations indicated that the RCAF could only afford to buy 54 F-35s, well below the minimum number of 65 needed to fill the role. Byers indicated the only options were to increase the funds available to buy the minimum number or else buy a more affordable aircraft. He also noted that increasing the money available was unlikely and noted that the Harper government had cut defence spending to the lowest levels in 50 years. Byers concluded, "the fact is, Harper took a reckless approach to replacing the CF-18s. He could have held a fair competition at the outset, and bought a proven model of fighter jet on-time and on-budget. Instead, he reached for the latest and most expensive technology, took on a significant cost risk, and got burned."

==== F-35 again as an election issue ====
With a federal election campaign underway, both the main opposition parties indicated they would hold a competition to replace the CF-18. On 21 September, Liberal Party of Canada leader Justin Trudeau promised an "open and transparent competition" to choose a more affordable aircraft than the F-35. Trudeau stated that money saved by not buying the F-35 would be employed to buy ships for the Royal Canadian Navy.

On 21 September 2015, Prime Minister Stephen Harper responded to Trudeau ruling out the F-35 as too expensive: "The Liberal Party is living in a dream world if they think we can pull out of the development project of the F-35 and not lose business ... Whether it's his statements on the aerospace industry, his statements on the deficit, you name it. It shows his disconnect and a profound lack of understanding about the Canadian economy." The same day NDP leader Tom Mulcair stated that Trudeau's ruling out the F-35 showed his "total lack of experience ... how can he decide the result in advance of the process? You can't do that." Mulcair indicated that the NDP would hold an open competition to replace the CF-18, that would include the F-35 as a contender.

On 21 September 2015, Trudeau spoke about the F-35 at a Orleans, Ontario election rally: "That F-35 might be Stephen Harper's dream, but I can tell you, for Canadian taxpayers, it'll be a nightmare." Writer Mark Gollom of CBC News noted that Trudeau used the F-35 issue to differentiate himself from the Conservative and NDP positions and "seemed to relish [Harper's response], wearing the insult almost as a badge of honour". A Canadian Press analysis of the claim that cancelling the F-35 would negatively affect the Canadian aerospace sector noted that F-35 contracts make up 2.29% of the industry's total revenues and would probably be offset with work on any new fighter chosen. Murray Brewster of The Canadian Press concluded: "Harper's claim earns the rating of "a lot of baloney.""

The Green Party of Canada stated in their 21 September 2015 election platform: "we will not purchase the F-35 stealth fighter jets. We will invest in new military equipment that fits Canada's defence requirements. We will purchase fixed-wing search and rescue planes, ice-breakers and replace dangerous old military hardware to ensure that threats to our military are not posed by the equipment we give them."

The Liberal Party of Canada released their 5 October 2015 election platform: "We will not buy the F-35 stealth fighter-bomber. We will immediately launch an open and transparent competition to replace the CF-18 fighter aircraft. The primary mission of our fighter aircraft should remain the defence of North America, not stealth first-strike capability. We will reduce the procurement budget for replacing the CF-18s, and will instead purchase one of the many, lower-priced options that better match Canada's defence needs ... We will make investing in the Royal Canadian Navy a top priority. By purchasing more affordable alternatives to the F-35s, we will be able to invest in strengthening our Navy."

The New Democratic Party of Canada released their election platform on 9 October 2015: "The attempt to sole-source the F-35 fighter jet while hiding the full costs was just one of several major procurement failures on the Conservatives' watch ... [we will] launch a comprehensive review, as part of the Defence White Paper, to determine how best to meet Canada's needs in the replacement of our aging fleet of CF-18 Fighters, and ensure that any new program is subject to a competitive process."

The Conservative Party of Canada also released their election platform on 9 October 2015. It made no mention of the F-35 or fighter procurement at all.

On 19 October 2015, the Liberal Party of Canada under Justin Trudeau won a large majority, after having made the election promise not to buy the F-35, but instead to hold an open competition excluding the F-35, to pick a more suitable aircraft.

==== Late 2015 ====
By October 2015, the Government of Canada had spent US$309.3M on the program, including US$10.6M on the concept demonstration phase, US$94.4M to the system development and demonstration phase and US$204.3M for the production, sustainment, and follow-on development phase. In 2014, a government report indicated that just over 30 Canadian firms had active contracts worth US$637M.

In November 2015, the Hill Times reported that the previous government had quietly disbanded the Public Works department secretariat established in 2012 that was in charge of reviewing the fighter procurement earlier in 2015, indicating that a decision had been made on the purchase. The cabinet had apparently not approved the procurement of the F-35.

Harjit Sajjan, the new Liberal Defence Minister refused to say that the F-35 would be excluded from a competition to replace the CF-18, as had been promised in the Liberal campaign document. Sajjan said, "my focus isn't about F-35 or any other aircraft; my focus is about replacing the CF-18s. We will open it up to an open process."

=== 2016 ===
In an interview in February 2016, Judy Foote, Minister of Public Services and Procurement, did not rule out including the F-35 in the competition to replace the CF-18. She indicated that Minister of National Defence Harjit Sajjan had not completed his review of the new fighter aircraft requirements. Foote said, "We need to look at what is required of the defence position we take as a country and we can do that by looking at any number of options."

In March 2016, Robert Work, U.S. Deputy Secretary of Defense, indicated that it was important for the Government of Canada to take its time and make the right decision on a fighter aircraft for its needs. He said, "It's important for Canada to make the decision on the aircraft that they need for their national interest, and then the United States and Canada can work it out ... These are very important political decisions and defence decisions for Canada to make, and we're not trying to pressure them in any way."

Conservative MP James Bezan warned that if Canada does not buy the F-35 that existing contracts with Canadian firms would be cancelled. Defence Minister Harjit Sajjan disagreed, saying "I don't think those jobs are going to be cancelled. These Canadian companies have been selected for a particular reason because of their skills." Lockheed Martin had previously stated that existing contracts with Canadian companies would not be cancelled, but that new contracts may not be awarded if Canada does not choose the F-35.

On 31 May 2016, the government missed a $32M payment to remain part of the F-35 consortium. A spokesperson for the defence department stated, "the missed payment does not signal Canada's withdrawal from the agreement".

In June 2016, the media reported multiple sources indicated that the new Liberal government had decided to buy Boeing F/A-18E/F Super Hornets as an "interim" fighter, after Defence Minister Harjit Sajjan warned that the country has an impending military capability gap. The F-18E/Fs would be retained until some future date after a competition is held. This approach may reduce the chances of lawsuits over the campaign promise not to buy the F-35. In response to the rumours about an interim fighter purchase, Lockheed Martin made statements that indicated that Canadian aerospace manufacturers would lose contracts to build F-35 components if the government buys an aircraft other than the F-35.

Alan Williams, who had previously criticized the Harper government for proposing to sole-source, said, "I was shocked, I don't think anyone would have expected that kind of behaviour ... I'm not sure companies want to take the government to court on this kind of thing, but, you know, there is no legal justification for doing this." On 6 June 2016, a spokeswoman for the Defence Minister stated that no sole-sourced deal had been discussed. On 10 June 2016, Pat Finn, the Assistant Defence Deputy Minister of Materiel, addressed a House of Commons committee and stated that all the possible options, including sole-sourcing and a full competition, were under study, but that no decision had been made.

On 22 November 2016, Sajjan announced that the country would acquire 18 Super Hornets as an interim measure to make up for the CF-18's waning capabilities. Sajjan noted that continuing to fly the CF-18s past their lifespan "would be imprudent and irresponsible". Minister of Public Services and Procurement Judy Foote indicated that a full competition would be held for a new fighter and that process would likely take five years, given a full defence policy review that is underway and must be completed first. Alan Williams, the DND's former head of procurement, responded to the Super Hornet announcement, saying it was "absurd ... I'm not sure whether the government really understands the business of defence procurement". Lockheed Martin responded to the news: "although disappointed with this decision, we remain confident the F-35 is the best solution to meet Canada's operational requirements at the most affordable price, and the F-35 has proven in all competitions to be lower in cost than fourth-generation competitors".

In November 2016, the government contributed a further C$36M to the F-35 development program, to maintain the country's status as a program participant, including access to F-35 contract work for Canadian companies.

=== 2017 ===
The Liberal government decided not to buy an interim fleet of Super Hornets after Boeing launched a trade action against Canada over subsidies paid to Bombardier for its CSeries airliners. Instead, Canada bought 18 used Royal Australian Air Force F/A-18s, delivered in January 2019, to keep its fleet of similar aircraft flying until a full competition can be held. The competition was to see a contract award in 2019 and first deliveries in 2025. Reports claimed that no company was excluded from the competition process, but were assessed on their "overall impact on Canada's economic interests", a move believed to penalize companies like Boeing for taking legal action against the country.

=== 2019 ===
In July 2019, the federal government released a formal request for proposals to purchase 88 new fighters. The request invited Airbus, Boeing, Lockheed Martin and Saab to submit proposals for their Eurofighter Typhoon, Boeing F/A-18E/F Super Hornet, F-35 and the Saab Gripen, in a competition that will assess the bids under a points system, assigning 60% for technical merit, 20% for cost and 20% for industrial benefits to Canada. The winner is expected to be announced in 2022 and first deliveries in 2025.

Dassault announced it would not place a bid for the competition in November 2018, citing cost and development issues with properly integrating the aircraft to the NORAD and Five Eyes requirements as being too high, as well as the high cost of integrating American weapon systems. Similarly, Airbus withdrew the Eurofighter Typhoon from the competition in August 2019, citing the same reasons as Dassault, leaving only the F/A-18E/F Super Hornet, F-35 and the Gripen E as potential contenders.

=== 2021 ===
In January 2021 Saab stated that if the Gripen E won the competition that it could be produced, assembled and maintained in Canada. The company also indicated that the Gripen would also meet all Canada's obligations under NORAD.

In November 2021, Boeing was informed that the Super Hornet bid did not meet Canada's requirements, leaving the F-35A Lightning II and the Saab 39 Gripen E as the two remaining candidates in the competition.

=== 2022 ===
On 28 March 2022, the Government of Canada announced that the competition had placed the F-35A first and planned to buy 88 of them. Under procurement rules, the government would then enter into negotiations with Lockheed Martin for the purchase and if an acceptable agreement was not reached then negotiations for the second place Saab Gripen would begin.

=== 2023 ===
On 9 January 2023, the Government of Canada announced that a deal had been signed to buy 88 F-35s. The first deliveries are expected in 2026, and the first squadron will be operational in 2029, with the full fleet operational between 2032 and 2034. The agreement stated these will be Lot 18, Block 4 aircraft, the most recent version as of November 2022. The price remained the same as previously announced in 2022, $19 billion, purchased in lots, with the cost of first four aircraft at $85 million each.

=== 2025 ===
On 14 March 2025, Defence Minister Bill Blair announced that Canada was looking at potential alternatives to the F-35 due to American tariffs and threats of annexation. The payment for the first 16 aircraft has already been paid and Minister Blair suggested that the first F-35s could be accepted, with the remainder of the fleet being made up by aircraft from European suppliers.

In March 2025 the Canadian government ordered a review of the F-35 purchase in order to examine other options beyond the already paid for 16 airframes. It has been widely speculated that the Saab JAS 39 Gripen would be the likely alternative. The review was to be completed by September 21, 2025, but as of October 10, 2025, has yet to be released.

=== 2026 ===
Canada made an additional payment for an additional 14 F-35s in February 2026, though this was not publicly announced and was only discovered when it was reported by various news outlets.

On September 23, 2026, the F-35 in Royal Canadian Air Force Markings has made its maiden flight out of Naval Air Station Joint Reserve Base Fort Worth. The RCAF received its first 2 jets on October 22, 2026 at Luke Air Force Base in Phoenix, Arizona.
