= Steven Staples =

Canadian policy analyst

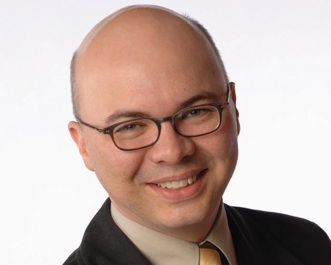
- Born: 1966 (age 59–60); Fredericton, New Brunswick
- Occupations: Writer, policy analyst
- Writing career
- Period: 2000s-present
- Notable work: Missile Defence: Round One

Steven Staples is a Canadian policy analyst. He is president of Public Response, a digital agency that services non-profit organizations and trade unions in the fields of online engagement and government relations.

He also founded the Rideau Institute, a non-profit, independent research, consulting and left-leaning advocacy group located in Ottawa, Ontario, Canada. The Rideau Institute specializes in defence and foreign affairs policy.

== Biography ==
Staples was born in Fredericton, New Brunswick in 1966 and now lives in Toronto, Ontario after living in Ottawa for 20 years. He attended Fredericton High School and has a Bachelor of Education from the University of New Brunswick.

Over the past 25 years, Staples has been involved with a number of organizations that promote peace, disarmament and restrictions on international trade. He has acted as the director of security programs for the Polaris Institute, issue campaigns coordinator for the Council of Canadians and the coordinator for End the Arms Race.

Staples was part of the anti-globalization movement, participating in protests at a meeting of the WTO in Seattle in 1999. Speaking at a meeting of NGOs, he linked corporate globalization to militarization and argued that "the WTO is a weapon of mass destruction."

Along with Peter Coombes, he is the founder of Ceasefire.ca, a network of 25,000 Canadians interested in peace and social justice issues. Ceasefire.ca acts as the public outreach and advocacy arms of the Rideau Institute, and focuses on internet-based campaigning.

Staples is also a member of the Canadian Pugwash Group, the Group of 78 and the international network of anti-nuclear groups, Abolition 2000.

On 20 October 2012, Staples received the Queen's Diamond Jubilee Medal from Ottawa Centre Member of Parliament Paul Dewar, for his commitment to peace and international security through disarmament.

== Writing and advocacy ==
Staples has written one book, Missile Defence: Round One (James Lorimer & Company Ltd., 2006) and was co-editor with Lucia Kowaluck of the anthology Afghanistan and Canada: Is There an Alternative to War (Black Rose Books, 2008).

He has also written and co-written reports about Canadian security and defence matters:

- Staples, Steven, "Pilot Error: Why the F-35 Lightning II stealth fighter is wrong for Canada," Canadian Centre for Policy Alternatives October 2010.
- Staples, Steven and Mike Wallace, "Ridding the Arctic of Nuclear Weapons: A Task Long Overdue," Rideau Institute and Canadian Pugwash Group March 2010
- Staples, Steven, and Bill Robinson, "More Than the Cold War: Canada’s military spending 2007–08," Canadian Centre for Policy Alternatives October 2007
- Staples, Steven, "No Bang for the Buck: Military contracting and public accountability," Canadian Centre for Policy Alternatives June 2007
- Staples, Steven, "Marching Orders: How Canada abandoned peacekeeping – and why the UN needs us now more than ever," The Council of Canadians October 2006
- Staples, Steven and Bill Robinson, "Canada's Fallen: Understanding Canadian Military Deaths in Afghanistan," Canadian Centre for Policy Alternatives September 2006

Staples is a regular commentator on programs like CTV News and CBC News Network, and contributes to major Canadian news chains like The Globe and Mail and the Toronto Star.

== Policy positions ==
=== Afghanistan ===
Staples is opposed to Canada's military presence in Afghanistan and has advocated for a negotiated settlement with the Taliban. In a 2006 report for the Council of Canadians, Staples argued:

"…Afghanistan must be rescued from the current cycle of violence. But Canada is complicit in this violence and should have never taken up its current ‘counter-insurgency’ war-fighting role in Kandahar. Instead, we should refocus our role in the country on diplomatic measures to win ‘the hearts and minds’ of the Afghan people, extend the legitimacy of the Afghan government, and ensure that aid dollars can reach those who need it most."

=== Canadian Defence Policies ===
Staples has been a vocal critic of increases to Canadian military spending.

In a 2012 presentation to the House of Commons Standing Committee on National Defence, Staples argued that the Canadian government has and continues to overspend on defence, and should reduce National Defence spending in order to return to pre-September 2001 levels. Staples made similar arguments in a 2011 presentation to the House of Commons Standing Committee on Finance.

Commenting on why the Government of Canada would set up military bases around the world to the Toronto Star's Thomas Walkom, Staples said: "The notion that we’re going to have permanent bases around the world is over the top. I don’t understand the rationale for parking a bunch of equipment in Singapore in case we might need it some time. That’s why we bought C-17s in the first place – so we could move troops and material quickly."

In May 2012, Staples contributed an op-ed to Embassy Magazine on why Canada does not need a defence industry, arguing that the industry takes up too much of the government's time, money and effort. He urged the Canadian government to create jobs by spending in other areas like education, and warned against concentrating too much on defence production thereby leaving the Canadian economy vulnerable to collapse.

=== Canadian F-35 II Lightning Purchase ===
Staples is strongly opposed to Canada's purchase of the F-35 II Lightning stealth fighter jets. Canadian magazine Maclean's once called him the "most outspoken critic of the purchase".

His 2010 report, Pilot Error: Why the F-35 Lightning II stealth fighter is wrong for Canada, was published by the Canadian Centre for Policy Alternatives. In a press release for the report, Staples argued: "This is a massive commitment of defence spending on ‘flying Cadillacs’ that is being driven by defence contractors, not by a clear-eyed view of Canada’s defence needs…Defending and controlling Canadian and North American airspace doesn’t require purchasing high-end first strike stealth fighters."

Staples contributed to two documentaries in 2012 that examined the Canadian government's decision to purchase the F-35: "Runaway Fighter" by CBC Television's the fifth estate and "Air Rage" by CTV's W5.

=== Nuclear disarmament ===
Staples is a strong proponent of nuclear disarmament and is involved with numerous anti-nuclear organizations. He is a director on the board of the Canadian Pugwash Group, a member of the Group of 78 and a member of the Coordinating Committee of Abolition 2000.

In a 2007 opinion piece for Embassy Magazine, Staples argued: "Now is the time for nuclear disarmament. Now is the time for Canada to join other middle power nations to avert a global catastrophe and abolish nuclear weapons."

In 2010, he co-authored the report Riding the Arctic of Nuclear Weapons: A Task Long Overdue with Michael Wallace, a former professor emeritus of the University of British Columbia. The report provides evidence that the Arctic is becoming a zone of increased military competition and follows in the footsteps of the Canadian Pugwash Group by issuing a call for the establishment of an Arctic Nuclear-Weapons-Free Zone.

=== Peacekeeping ===
Staples has spoken out in favour of a continuing commitment by Canada to United Nations peacekeeping missions. His 2006 report for the Council of Canadians, Marching Orders: How Canada abandoned peacekeeping – and why the UN needs us now more than ever, argued that Canada should provide more support to UN missions.

In a July 2012 piece by Paul Koring of The Globe and Mail on Canada's role in international peacekeeping, Staples commented: "The need is greater than ever but Canada’s contribution has never been lower, the Harper government doesn’t regard peacekeeping as a route to enhancing Canada’s international stature."
