= Ceasefire (disambiguation) =

A ceasefire is a temporary stoppage of a war in which each side agrees with the other to suspend aggressive actions.

Cease Fire or Ceasefire may also refer to:

== Media ==
- "Cease Fire", the ninth song from Christina Aguilera's 2012 album Lotus
- Cease Fire (1953 film), a war movie directed by Owen Crump
- Cease Fire (1985 film), an American drama film directed by David Nutter
- Cease Fire (2006 film), an Iranian film written and directed by Tahmineh Milani
- Salaar: Part 1 – Ceasefire, a 2023 Indian action film
- "Cease Fire" (Star Trek: Enterprise), the forty-first episode of the television series Star Trek: Enterprise
- "Ceasefire" (M*A*S*H), the twenty-third episode of the first season of the American television series M*A*S*H

== Other ==
- Ceasefire Canada, a peace organization based in Canada
- Cure Violence (previously CeaseFire), a public health anti-violence program
- Operation Ceasefire, a problem-oriented policing initiative implemented in 1996 in Boston, Massachusetts
