= Henry Garfield Pardy =

Canadian politician

Henry Garfield "Gar" Pardy is a former diplomat in the Canadian Department of Foreign Affairs. Although he retired as director general of the consular affairs bureau in 2003, but has maintained a strong presence in the department.

When Foreign Affairs began making press statements on the Omar Khadr case through Pardy in 2002, legal adviser Colleen Swords sent him an eMail telling him to "claw back on the fact [Omar] is a minor" in his statements on the case. The same year, he was considered instrumental in seeking consular services for Maher Arar as he was detained in a Syrian prison. He was called to testify before the Royal Commission investigating the matter on October 24, 2005.

After that, Pardy became notable for his "sharp" rebukes to Canadians held by foreign governments pleading for Canadian assistance.

Pardy recently organized a letter from more than 100 former ambassadors criticizing the Harper government for attacking the credibility of diplomat Richard Colvin, who says he warned the government in 2006 about torture.

In an interview with the Canadian Broadcast Corporation (CBC) on April 8, 2010, Pardy was interviewed regarding the case of Nazia Quazi, a dual Indian and Canadian citizen who, after visiting her father in Saudi Arabia, was unable to return to Canada, since her father was able to assume "guardianship" over her and block her exit from the country, in accordance with Islamic law and tradition. Pardy suggested that Canadian policy toward Israel was to blame for Ms. Quazi's situation. Pardy argued that "the fact that we [Canada] have taken ourselves out as a balanced observer [regarding the Israeli-Palestinian conflict] ... is not looked at with any degree of friendliness in Saudi Arabia." When the host directly asked him "Are you suggesting that Canada’s Israel policy could leave young Canadian women in limbo?", Mr. Pardy replied "Yes."

Pardy was subsequently criticized for his comments by Jonathan Kay in the National Post who wrote rhetorically that "when a repressive Arab Muslim theocracy seizes a Canadian citizen under cover of blatantly misogynistic Wahabi Islamic rules governing women, the real villain can be traced back to … Israel."

In August 2011, Pardy sharply criticized the Canadian government for issuing a press release which he claimed "could have been issued by the Foreign Ministry of the government of Israel without changes" while adding that "The only thing missing was a background chorus of "Hava Nagila"."

From 1989 to 1992, Pardy was the Canadian Ambassador to Costa Rica, Honduras, Nicaragua, Panama, and El Salvador.

In March, 2016, the Rideau Institute published a report Pardy wrote, on the erosion in Canada's provision of consular services to its citizens in foreign country. On March 29, 2016, an editorial in the Ottawa Citizen called for Justin Trudeau's ministry to pay attention to Pardy's report.
