= Canadian Peace Alliance =

Canadian umbrella peace organization

- The Canadian Peace Alliance / L'Alliance canadienne pour la paix
- Location: Canada

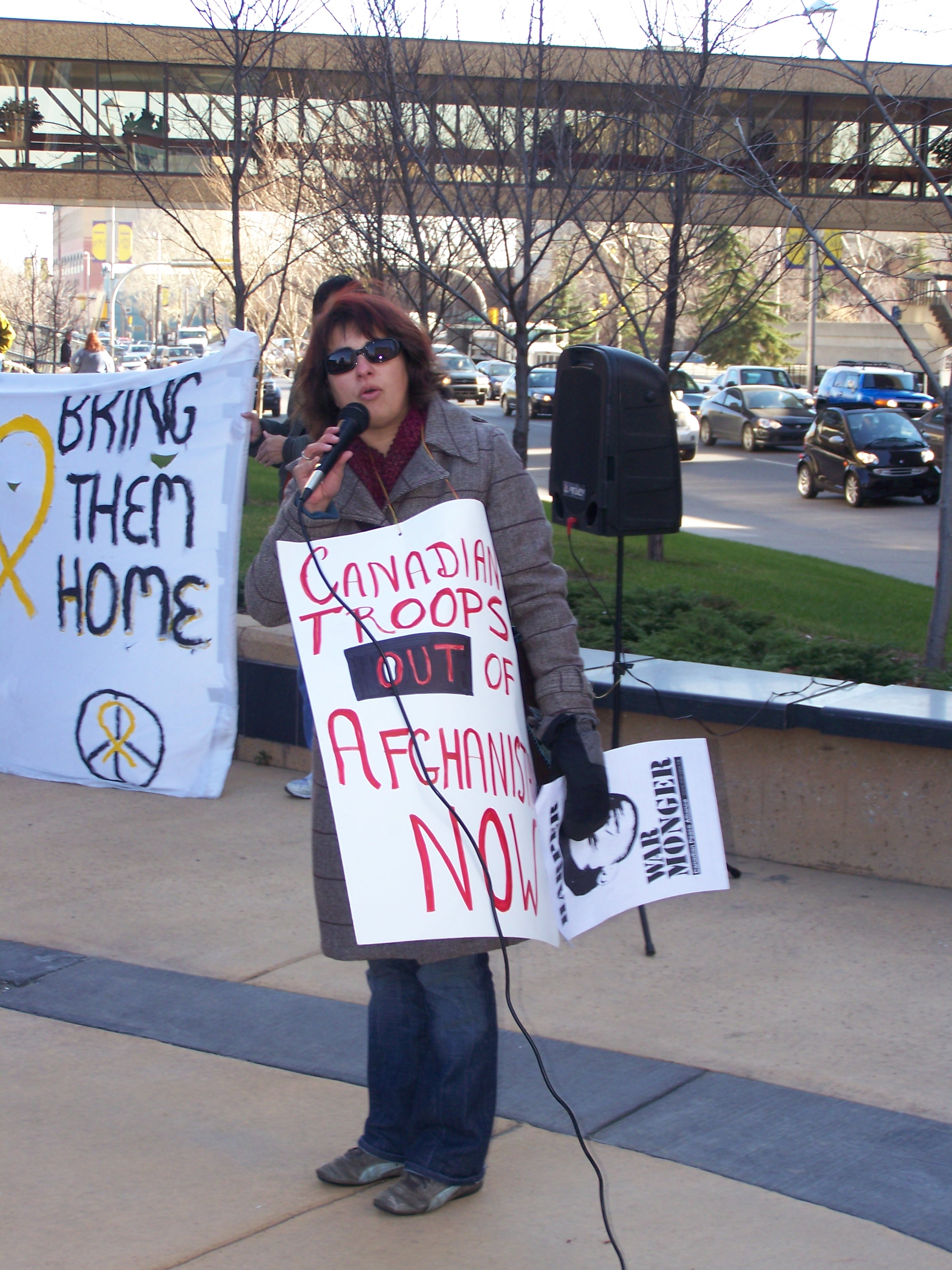
Collette Lemieux, co-chair of the Canadian Peace Alliance, speaking to an anti-war rally in Calgary she helped organize in 2007 as part of the Pan-Canadian Day of Action on Canada's military involvement in Afghanistan

The Canadian Peace Alliance / L'Alliance canadienne pour la paix (CPA/ACP) was a Canadian umbrella peace organization claiming more than 140 member groups. It was founded in 1985, but became inactive in 2017.

The Canadian Peace Alliance organized cross-Canada campaigns and actions; arranged political lobbying sessions between member groups and key political leaders in Ottawa; facilitated the development of strategies for the Canadian peace movement; and produced and distributed education and action materials.

The Canadian Peace Alliance's policy and campaign direction was determined by a bi-annual convention of member groups and by a geographically representative Steering Committee.

The Canadian Peace Alliance worked closely with the Canadian Labour Congress.

== See also ==
- Ceasefire Canada
- Canadian Peace Congress
- List of anti-war organizations
- List of peace activists
