= The Embassy =

The Embassy may refer to:

- The Embassy (band), a Swedish music group
- Mogul Embassy, a professional wrestling faction in Ring of Honor better known as The Embassy
  - World Professional Darts Championship, a championship previously referred to as The Embassy
- The Embassy Lark, a radio comedy series broadcast from 1966 to 1968 as a spin-off from The Navy Lark
- The Embassy Visual Effects, a visual effects studio located in Vancouver, Canada
- The Embassy (TV series), a 2014 Australian factual television series

== See also ==
- Embassy (disambiguation)
