= RightOnCanada.ca =

RightOnCanada.ca is an independent research and advocacy group based in Ottawa, Canada, and is affiliated with the Rideau Institute. It is an internet and public advocacy campaign to make human rights a key concern of the Canadian government's political agenda by providing research, analysis and commentary on public policy issues. Supporters of this campaign believe that Canadian citizens feel that their government should play a leadership role in advancing issues such as human rights, social justice, democracy and environmental sustainability. The founder and coordinator of RightOnCanada.ca is Kathleen Ruff. She is the former director of the Court Challenges Program of Canada and the former director of the BC Human Rights Commission. Currently, she is the President of the Rotterdam Convention Alliance and is a senior advisor on human rights to the Rideau Institute. RightOnCanada.ca is an independent organization and does not receive government funding. The only funding it receives is from individual donors. It has purposefully not sought charitable tax status so that it is not restricted in its activism and lobbying activities.

== Holistic approach ==
The campaign uses what is refers to as a holistic approach. Human rights and the environment are deeply interconnected and therefore these issues cannot be dealt with separately but as one. The campaign believes communities have a responsibility to care about human rights and should act as responsible stewards of the environment.

== Grass roots campaigning ==
RightOnCanada.ca is a campaign that operates at the grass roots level by encouraging citizens to lobby the government through actions such as:

- signing on to receive their action alerts and sending letters to MPs and the government
- raising public awareness of their website
- donating to support the work of RightOnCanada.ca and its campaigns
- volunteering to help with advocacy campaigns
- sending in ideas for action campaigns

== Strategies ==
RightOnCanada.ca's main approach to campaigning is to hold MPs accountable to Canadians. MPs who have relevant ministerial or critic responsibilities are specifically targeted and local citizen efforts are supported. The key idea is to empower Canadians who too often see their government's policies dictated by non-accountable institutions such as the World Trade Organization (WTO), the International Monetary Fund (IMF) and the World Bank. The goal of the campaign is foster an open democratic process and policies that put the well-being of people and the planet first.

== Demilitarization ==
One of the main concerns of the RightOnCanada.ca campaign is militarization. Supporters of the campaign feel that the Canadian government is aligning the country with the United States's policies that are based increasingly on militarization and weaponry. This prevents Canada from being a leader in promoting human rights, democracy and a healthy environment.

== Campaigns ==
RightOnCanada.ca has worked to raise awareness on the following issues:

- Asbestos poisoning and the marketing of asbestos by Canada to developing countries
- The dangers of terminator technology
- Stopping genetically engineered trees
- Biofuels and the food crisis
- Security and Prosperity Partnership
- Water security

== Reports ==
Ruff, Kathleen "Exporting Harm: How Canada Markets Asbestos to the Developing World" The Rideau Institute (October 2008)
