= Embassy (novel) =

1969 novel by Stephen Coulter

- Author: Stephen Coulter
- Language: English
- Genre: Spy thriller
- Publisher: Heinemann
- Publication date: 1969
- Publication place: United Kingdom
- Media type: Print

Embassy is a 1969 spy thriller novel by a British writer named Stephen Coulter. A top Soviet official defects to the West and takes shelter in the American Embassy in Paris.

In 1972 the novel was adapted into a film of the same title directed by Gordon Hessler starring Richard Roundtree and Ray Milland.

== Bibliography ==
- Reilly, John M. Twentieth Century Crime & Mystery Writers. Springer, 2015.
