= Embassy (film) =

1972 British film by Gordon Hessler

- Directed by: Gordon Hessler
- Written by: John Bird; William Fairchild
- Based on: Embassy by Stephen Coulter
- Produced by: Mel Ferrer
- Starring: Richard Roundtree; Chuck Connors; Marie-José Nat; Ray Milland
- Cinematography: Raoul Coutard
- Edited by: Willy Kemplen
- Music by: Jonathan Hodge
- Production companies: Triad Productions; Weaver Productions
- Distributed by: Hemdale Film Distribution
- Release date: 2 March 1972
- Running time: 90 minutes
- Country: United Kingdom
- Language: English

Embassy (also known as Target Embassy) is a 1972 British spy thriller film directed by Gordon Hessler, written by John Bird and William Fairchild, and with music scored by Biddu. It is based on the 1969 novel of the same title by Stephen Coulter. It was shot on location in Beirut where the film is set, whereas the novel had been centred in Paris.

The film starred Richard Roundtree as a CIA officer, Ray Milland as an Ambassador, Max von Sydow as a Russian defector taking refuge at the embassy, and Chuck Connors as a KGB assassin posing as a U.S. Air Force officer. Broderick Crawford played the embassy Regional Security Officer, Frank Dunniger, who had to capture and hide the KGB man while the CIA smuggled the defector out of town.

== Cast ==
- Richard Roundtree as Richard 'Dick' Shannon
- Chuck Connors as Kesten
- Marie-José Nat as Laure
- Ray Milland as Ambassador
- Broderick Crawford as Frank Dunniger
- Max von Sydow as Gorenko
- David Bauer as Kadish
- Larry Cross as Gamble
- David Healy as Phelan
- Karl Held as Rylands
- Sarah Marshall as Miss Harding
- Dee Pollock as Stacey
- Leila Buheiry as Leila, receptionist
- Gail Clymer as switchboard operator
- Edmond Hannania as first man in black
- Saladin Nader as Roget
- Peter Smith as cipher clerk
- Dean Turner as Clem Gelber

== Bibliography ==
- James McKay. Ray Milland: The Films, 1929-1984. McFarland, 2020.
