= Ceasefire Canada =

Campaign against defense alignment

Ceasefire Canada (Ceasefire.ca) was founded in 2003 by Steven Staples and Peter Coombes to prevent Canada from joining the U.S Ballistic Missile Defense program. Staples and Coombes were inspired by the success of web-based campaigns such as Moveon.org. Ceasefire.com was intended to be a web-based tool for citizen action on Canadian government policy. In 2007 Ceasefire.ca moved to the Rideau Institute under the direction of Steven Staples. Over the years it has been involved in a number of campaigns. It was involved in the campaign against the George W. Bush's Star Wars program, it helped push many Canadian politicians to oppose the war in Afghanistan, allowed US war resisters to stay in Canada, called for the ban on deadly cluster bombs, lobbied for the abolishment of nuclear weapons, and worked to prevent the weaponization of space. From its humble beginnings Ceasefire.ca has grown to a membership of 15,000 subscribers who receive online bulletins and take part in online letter writing campaigns. Also, over 1000 have become donors and help fund the organization's campaign work and research activities.

== Activities ==
=== Blog posts ===
One of the key features on the Ceasefire.ca website is the regular blog posts on issues that Ceasefire.ca is involved with. These range from the War in Afghanistan (2001–present), nuclear disarmament, missile defence to Canadian military spending. Posts are provided by staff, students and interns. Many volunteers and interns are students from Carleton University, University of Ottawa and Saint Paul University. The blogs are edited by Bill Robinson who has been writing on Canadian defence and security policy issues since 1983. He was also a member of Project Ploughshares. In addition he has contributed to Canadian Network to Abolish Nuclear Weapons, the Polaris Institute, the Canadian Centre for Policy Alternatives and the Rideau Institute on International Affairs.

=== Action Alerts ===
Ceasefire.ca mobilizes its members to take action on issues that affect peace and justice. Through its Action Alerts it raises awareness for its surveys, letter writing and postcard campaigns. Examples of this would be a letter writing campaign calling for an inquiry into the torture scandal and the campaign for a federal department for peace.

=== Events ===
Ceasefire.ca also works to promote events that work towards peace. It makes its subscribers aware of guest speakers, forums, book launches and other peace related events.

=== Media coverage ===
The site covers media content by make the public aware of major reports, studies and news stories.

=== Newsletter ===
The newsletter is a service that the public can subscribe to. Sent out once or twice a month, the newsletter makes its subscribers aware of all the latest news on the issues concerning Canada, peace and justice.

== Supporters ==
With over 15,000 subscribers and 1000 donors Ceasefire.ca works to promotes peace and justice. They have also attracted key supporters such as David Suzuki, Matthew Good, Maude Barlow, Mel Hurtig and Helen Caldicott.

== See also ==
- Canadian Peace Alliance
- List of Iraq War Resisters
- List of anti-war organizations
