= Embassy Theatre =

Embassy Theatre may refer to:

== United Kingdom ==
- Embassy Theatre (London)
- Embassy Theatre, Peterborough

== United States ==
- Embassy Theatre (Fort Wayne), Indiana
- Embassy Theatre (Cumberland), Maryland
- Embassy Theatre (Lewistown), Pennsylvania
- Embassy Theatre (New York City)
- Embassy Theatre (Rochester, New York)

== Elsewhwere ==
- Embassy Theatre, Wellington, New Zealand

== See also ==
- Embassy Ballroom, Adelaide, Australia (later a theatre)
