= Polaris Institute =

Canadian think tank

- Founded: 1997
- Type: Non-Profit
- Purpose: Social Justice, Environmental Justice
- Location: Ottawa, Ontario, Canada
- Region served: Canada
- Key people: Tony Clarke, president Richard Girard, executive director
- Website: www.polarisinstitute.org

The Polaris Institute is a Canadian think tank based in Ottawa, Ontario. Its stated goal is "to help empower citizen movements towards democratic social change". It was formed in 1997 in response to its view that citizens were becoming politically disenfranchised in an age of corporate driven globalization.

The catalyst for the formation of the organization was the passing of two controversial trade agreements, the Canada-U.S. Free Trade Agreement of 1989 and the North American Free Trade Agreement of 1994.

The organization currently focuses its work on six projects:

- Water Rights: a multi-year campaign to promote public tap water and establish bottle water free zones’ in schools, universities, colleges and municipalities supplemented with work on a comprehensive ban on bulk water exports plus solidarity actions with water justice struggles and movements in Mexico, South Africa, and India.
- Energy Transition: a multi-group campaign with other Canadian and US groups to put a cap on the production and export of crude oil from the Alberta tar sands and promote the development of clean and renewable energy sources.
- Indigenous Rights: an ongoing initiative led by indigenous activists committed to grassroots mobilizations in First Nations communities affected by tar sands development as well as an initiative to focus on the financial risk of investing on disputed First Nations lands.
- Climate Jobs/Green Economy: a program wherein Polaris has played a role in organizing a new nationwide alliance of the country's major labor unions, environmental and social justice organizations to develop and promote a common policy platform for transitioning to a green economy.
- Corporate Profiles: ongoing critical analysis of the corporate power that influences government policy making. Work includes developing corporate profiles on some of the major corporate players and providing a rapid response mechanism for community and movement activists on corporate research matters. Current projects include profiles of water services corporations operating in Canada, the influence of corporations over immigration policy in Canada, research on foreign and Canadian mining corporations and the lobbying activities of tar sands industry.
- Global Justice: a program involving social movements and NGOs from around the world focused on corporate power [through the Global Campaign to Dismantle Corporate Power] and global trade justice issues [through Our World is Not For Sale]. These movements are engaged primarily in: challenging the GATS regime at the World Trade Organization; mobilizing resistance to the G20; and confronting the corporate capture of the United Nations.
