= Rideau Institute =

Political advocacy group in Ontario, Canada

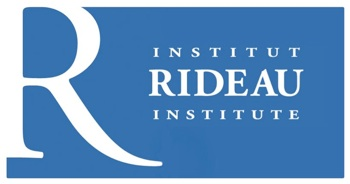
- Abbreviation: RI
- Formation: 2007
- Type: non-profit research organization based in Canada
- Legal status: active
- Purpose: advocate and public voice, educator and network
- Headquarters: Ottawa, Ontario, Canada
- Region served: Canada
- Official language: English, French
- Website: Rideau Institute website

The Rideau Institute is a non-profit independent research and advocacy group based in Ottawa. It focuses on foreign policy and defence policy issues.

It was founded in January 2007. It is based in Ottawa, Ontario, Canada.

== Personnel ==
=== Directors ===
- Peggy Mason, President of the Rideau Institute, former UN Ambassador for Disarmament
- Steven Staples, Vice-President of the Rideau Institute, commentator, and author of Missile Defence: Round One
- Michael Byers, Professor and Canada Research Chair in Global Politics and International Law at the University of British Columbia and author of Intent for a Nation, What is Canada For?
- Bruce Campbell, Executive Director of the Canadian Centre for Policy Alternatives and author of numerous books and studies on Canadian public policy
- Kathleen Ruff, former Director of the British Columbia Human Rights Commission and former director of the Court Challenges Program

=== Senior Advisors ===
- Maude Barlow, author and Chairperson of The Council of Canadians
- Peter Coombes, co-founder of Ceasefire.ca and Job Evaluation Representative for CUPE
- Murray Dobbin, political commentator and author
- Walter Dorn, Associate Professor of Defence Studies, Royal Military College of Canada
- Wade Huntley, Director of the Simons Centre for Disarmament and Non-Proliferation Research, Liu Institute for Global Issues, University of British Columbia
- Anil Naidoo, International water policy analyst and Project Organizer of the Blue Planet Project
- Douglas Roche, author, former parliamentarian and senator (retired)
- Bill Robinson, former Program Associate, Project Ploughshares
- Erika Simpson, Associate Professor of Political Science, University of Western Ontario
- Scott Sinclair, director of Trade and Investment Research Project, Canadian Centre for Policy Alternatives
- Alice Slater, Director, Nuclear Age Peace Foundation, NY
- Gar Pardy, former Canadian diplomat

== See also ==
- Ceasefire Canada
- RightOnCanada.ca
