= Embassy (magazine) =

Canadian foreign policy magazine

Embassy was a weekly Canadian foreign policy magazine. Founded in 2004, it covered defence, foreign policy, development and aid, trade and security news and opinion from a Canadian perspective. The Embassy offices were in Ottawa, Ontario. In March 2016 it was absorbed into the Hill Times.
