= Darker than Amber (film) =

1970 film by Robert Clouse

- Original poster
- Directed by: Robert Clouse
- Written by: John D. MacDonald; Ed Waters
- Produced by: Jack Reeves (executive producer); Walter Seltzer (producer)
- Starring: Rod Taylor; Suzy Kendall; Jane Russell; Janet MacLachlan; Theodore Bikel
- Cinematography: Frank V. Phillips
- Edited by: Fred A. Chulack
- Music by: John Carl Parker
- Production company: Cinema Center Films
- Distributed by: National General Pictures
- Release date: August 14, 1970
- Running time: 96 minutes
- Country: United States
- Language: English
- Budget: $2,607,328
- Box office: $1,621,897

Darker than Amber is a 1970 film adaptation of John D. MacDonald's 1966 mystery/suspense novel Darker than Amber. It was directed by Robert Clouse from a screenplay by MacDonald and Ed Waters.

The film starred Rod Taylor as Travis McGee, the protagonist of a series of successful novels by MacDonald. Darker than Amber and The Empty Copper Sea (adapted as the 1983 film Travis McGee starring Sam Elliott) remain the only McGee novels adapted to the big screen to date.

Critical reception was positive, but the film was not a financial success.

== Plot ==
Travis McGee and his close friend Meyer are fishing underneath a bridge in their coastal Florida home. To their shock a young woman is thrown off the bridge; she is bound and a foot is strapped to a dumbbell with an ankle adapter. Travis dives in and saves her, learning her name is Vangie. He is surprised when she insists that he not contact the police and Travis finds himself falling in love with the mysterious woman.

She gradually opens up to Travis, admitting that she was nearly killed due to her involvement in a prostitution ring and a murder scheme. Vangie was part of a team that worked in male/female pairs on cruise ships: pretty young women lured rich lonely men and then drugged their drinks to rob them when they were passed out. The male partner, a sadistic bodybuilder named Terry, throws the men overboard to drown. Vangie became a target when she objected to the murders, having been led to believe the men would only be robbed.

Despite Travis and Meyer's efforts to protect Vangie, Terry tracks her down and murders her. Travis and Meyer then set out to dismantle the gang. They locate a woman named Merrimay, who bears a striking resemblance to Vangie. On a cruise ship, Travis poses as a wealthy man traveling alone, serving as bait for Terry and his new partner Del. Del approaches Travis and invites him to her room—but knowing their scheme he refuses to take the drinks she serves and warns that her life is in danger. Angry that Travis has located him, Terry, who was lying in wait in an adjoining room, savagely attacks Travis who is overwhelmed after wounding Terry.

Terry flees the cruise ship where Meyer and Merrimay are waiting at the pier. Merrimay, her hair dyed to closer resemble Vangie, calls out to Terry. Already bloodied by his fight with Travis, Terry goes berserk at the idea that Vangie survived and storms down the gangplank towards her, punching anyone in his way. Security guards try stopping Terry, but they only slow him until Travis appears and takes down the muscle-bound killer with a blow from a wooden 2x4.

The movie ends with Travis and Merrimay talking on his houseboat The Busted Flush. She asks if he still is in love with Vangie and hints that she might want a relationship with him, but McGee replies by saying he will need time to consider if he is ready for a new love in his life.

== Cast ==
- Rod Taylor as Travis McGee
- Theodore Bikel as Meyer
- Suzy Kendall as Vangie / Merrimay
- Jane Russell as Alabama Tigress
- William Smith as Terry
- Ahna Capri (credited as Anna Capri) as Del
- Janet MacLachlan as Noreen
- Robert Phillips as Griff
- James Booth as Burk
- Oswaldo Calvo as Manuel
- Sherry Faber as Nina
- Marcia Knight as landlady
- James H. Frysinger as Dewey Powell
- Harry A. Wood as Judson
- Jack Nagle as Farnsworth
- Judy Wallace as Ginny
- Michael DeBeausset as doctor
- Jeff Gillen as Morgue attendant
- Chris Robinson as Roy

== Production ==
Other actors considered for the role of Travis McGee were Jack Lord and Robert Culp. John D. MacDonald pushed for Steve McQueen or Vic Morrow. The movie was shot on location in Florida and Nassau.

== Reception ==
=== Critical ===
Though it did not gross well in the box office, Darker than Amber earned many positive reviews. Roger Ebert gave the film 3.5 stars out of a possible 4. He wrote that Taylor, somewhat playing against type by showing more warmth than his usual taciturn performances, was well-cast as McGee and that the plot managed to transcend standard detective cliches to become "a surprisingly good movie". Howard Thompson of The New York Times also gave the film reserved praise, stating that the cinematography was "excellent" and that the film was "better than average for this type [of crime film]" and Smith was "a truly horrendous giant of a psycho", but that the screenplay lagged in parts despite the good material to work from (in the original novel), and that the real star of the film was its Florida setting.

MacDonald disliked the film calling it "feral, cheap, rotten, gratuitously meretricious, shallow and embarrassing."

The film played a rare theatrical screening at Anthology Film Archives in New York City, New York, on August 14, 2009.

=== Box office ===
The film recorded admissions of 17,351 in France.

The film recorded a loss of $2,958,251. Producer Jack Reeves had bought the rights for another McGee novel The Deep Blue Goodbye but it was decided not to proceed with it.

== Fight scenes and rating ==
Initially rated R in the United States, in 1971 it was edited and re-rated GP (now PG). The film was considered graphically violent for its time, especially the fist fight scene that ends the film, between Rod Taylor's Travis Mcgee and the film's villain, Terry (played by William Smith). Director Steven Soderbergh said the fight's ferocity was considered "jaw dropping" for its era. With the cameras rolling Rod Taylor hit William Smith who retaliated in kind, and a staged fight scene became a real fight. Smith later reported that Taylor was "a very tough guy" who broke three of his ribs while he broke Taylor's nose.

After Darker Than Amber ran its course in theaters, both Rod Taylor and William Smith would reportedly be considered for the part of Caucasian martial artist Roper in the 1973 Bruce Lee blockbuster Enter the Dragon, which would also be helmed by Darker Than Amber director Robert Clouse. The role would ultimately go to John Saxon, however.

== See also ==
- List of American films of 1970

== Reviews ==
- Thompson, Howard (August 15, 1970). "Darker Than Amber (1970)". The New York Times. Archived from the original on May 21, 2011.
- Ebert, Roger (January 12, 1971). "Darker Than Amber". Chicago Sun-Times.
- Heuck, Marc Edward (February 10, 2020). "The Pack & Darker Than Amber". New Beverly Cinema. Los Angeles. Archived from the original on February 15, 2020.
