= The Deep Blue Good-by =

1964 novel by John D. MacDonald

- First edition cover
- Author: John D. MacDonald
- Language: English
- Series: Travis McGee
- Genre: Mystery
- Publisher: Fawcett Publications
- Publication date: May 21, 1964
- Publication place: United States
- Media type: Print (paperback)
- Pages: 144 (Mass Market Paperback)
- ISBN: 0-449-22383-3 (Paperback)
- OCLC: 32512809
- Followed by: Nightmare in Pink

The Deep Blue Good-by is the first of 21 novels in the Travis McGee series by American author John D. MacDonald.

Commissioned in 1964 by Fawcett Publications editor Knox Burger, the book establishes for the series an investigative protagonist in a residential Florida base. All titles in the 21-volume series include a color, a mnemonic device which was suggested by his publisher so that when harried travelers in airports looked to buy a book, they could at once see those MacDonald titles they had not yet read.

== Concept and creation ==
At the request of Knox Burger, then at Fawcett, I attempted a series character. I took three shots at it to get one book with a character I could stay with. That was in 1964. Once I had the first McGee book, The Deep Blue Good-by, they held it up until I had finished two more, Nightmare in Pink and A Purple Place for Dying, then released one a month for three months. That launched the series.

— John D. MacDonald, Interview by Edward Gorman

MacDonald also said that he considered all the novels in the series as one long story in many instalments on the life and times of Travis McGee. Each of the 21 novels adds more information on McGee's history, background and psyche, as the character evolves over the decades. The novels also reflect cultural change in America, from the Kennedy years in The Deep Blue Good-bye, through the upheaval of hippie counterculture and the sexual revolution of the late 1960s and 1970s, to setting of the last book, The Lonely Silver Rain (1985) in the Reagan years. As a chronicler of the cultural zeitgeist, MacDonald has been compared with Charles Dickens.

MacDonald originally planned to call the character Dallas McGee, after the city, but after the Kennedy assassination he decided that name had too many negative connotations. He was searching for a first name for McGee when a friend suggested that he look at the names of the many Air Force bases in California. MacDonald's attention was caught by Travis Air Force Base in Fairfield, so he named his character Travis.

The McGee novels feature a variety of female companions and villains, exotic locales in Florida, Mexico, and the Caribbean, and appearances by a sidekick known only as "Meyer," a Ph.D. economist of international renown.

== Travis McGee profile ==
As Sherlock Holmes had his well-known address on Baker Street, McGee had his trademark lodgings on his 52-foot (16 m) houseboat, the Busted Flush, named for the poker hand that started the run of luck in which he won her. She is docked at Slip F-18, Bahia Mar marina, Fort Lauderdale, Florida. McGee also owns a custom vintage Rolls-Royce that had been converted into a pickup truck long before he bought it, and painted "a horrid electric blue" by the same hand that did the conversion. McGee named it Miss Agnes, after one of his elementary school teachers whose hair was the same shade.

McGee's business card reads "Salvage Consultant", and most business comes by word of mouth. His clients are usually people who have been deprived of something important and/or valuable (typically by unscrupulous or illegal means) and have no way to regain it lawfully. McGee's usual fee is half the value of the item (if recovered). McGee works when he has to, almost always only taking jobs when his supply of money (kept in an ingenious "hidey-hole" aboard the Flush) is low. In one tale, however, McGee avenges the murder of a long-time friend. In another, he is asked by the daughter of a friend to find out why her husband is trying to kill her. While he can be mercenary at times, he is not a mercenary.

Physically, McGee is a tall, tanned, sandy-haired man with pale grey eyes. Several books hint (or explicitly state) that he is a U.S. Army veteran of the Korean War. However, later books are less precise about exactly when he served. In The Green Ripper, one of the later novels, there are implications that his military service was during the Vietnam War rather than Korea. In The Lonely Silver Rain he visits a bank safe-deposit box in which he keeps a few precious keepsakes including photos of his father, mother, and brother, "all long dead," and he mentions that the box also contains his Silver Star, Purple Heart, and honorable discharge certificate, all awarded by the U.S. Army to "Sergeant McGee". He also has a daughter named Jean, unknown to him until she reveals herself in "The Lonely Silver Rain" as the result of a long-ago love affair. He was a stand-out college football player (at tight end) but says in A Deadly Shade of Gold that he never played professional football due to a knee injury. However, in The Turquoise Lament he admits to a sports-trivia fan that he played professional football for a couple of seasons before his knees were wrecked in a tackle by an opponent from the Detroit Lions. Psychologically he's an introspective and mysterious person.

Despite his age (his rare but recurring allusion to "birthdays with a zero in them" indicates he was about 30 at the beginning of the series and about 50 at its end), he retains the quickness and agility of a professional athlete. He stands 6 ft 4 in (1.93 m) tall and, although deceptively unimposing at his "fighting weight" of 205 pounds (93 kg), he is much stronger than he looks, with thick wrists and long arms; occasionally, a more perspicacious adversary notes these features when deciding whether to tangle with him. McGee purposely cultivates an image of being uncoordinated, shambling, and clumsy, but has superb reflexes and muscle memory. He has a 33-inch waist, wears a size 46 long jacket, and a shirt with a 17½" neck and 34" arms. McGee often discusses his fitness regimen, usually in terms of regaining his fitness after a lazy period: swimming and sprinting are frequently mentioned. At one time he was a pipe smoker, but eventually gave it up in order to maintain his physical fitness. As a martial art strategy, he often covers his face and blocks punches with his arms and elbows to lull and tire his opponent while studying that opponent's fighting style. In the final novel, McGee is described as practicing the Chinese art of tai chi.

However, unlike other fictional detectives such as Raymond Chandler's jaded and world-weary Philip Marlowe, McGee clings to what is important to him: his senses of honor, obligation, and outrage. In a classic commentary in Bright Orange for the Shroud, McGee muses,

Now, of course, having failed in every attempt to subdue the Glades by frontal attack, we are slowly killing it off by tapping the River of Grass. In the questionable name of progress, the state in its vast wisdom lets every two-bit developer divert the flow into drag-lined canals that give him "waterfront" lots to sell. As far north as Corkscrew Swamp, virgin stands of ancient bald cypress are dying. All the area north of Copeland had been logged out, and will never come back. As the glades dry, the big fires come with increasing frequency. The ecology is changing with egret colonies dwindling, mullet getting scarce, mangrove dying of new diseases born of dryness.

This was in a paperback originally published in 1965 when the general public was still not conversant with the concept of environmentalism.

== Plot summary ==
The Deep Blue Good-by introduces readers to McGee, his place of residence, the Busted Flush (a houseboat he won in a poker game), and its mooring place, slip F-18 at the Bahia Mar Marina in Fort Lauderdale, Florida. In the early chapters we learn that McGee is a bachelor, a man who can be friends with ladies as well as have a passion for them, and a man of principle (although they are somewhat at the mercy of his uncertain emotional condition and his circumstances at the moment; in McGee's own words, "Some of them I'll bend way, way, over, but not break.").

Another feature of the McGee series is the seemingly unending parade of colorful and invariably evil villains whom McGee must contend with in order to make a recovery for his clients. In this first story the antagonist is Junior Allen, a smiling, seemingly friendly man, large, "cat quick", powerful, and pathologically evil. The story begins with a fortune smuggled home after World War II by a soldier who was a native of the Florida Keys. This soldier killed another soldier just prior to his discharge, went on the run back to the Keys, and buried his treasure there. He was later captured by the U.S. Army and sent to a military prison, where he met Junior Allen. Allen discovered vague details about the fortune hidden in the Keys and after his release from prison went there to find it. The story depicts the psychotic behavior of Allen as he evolves from thief to serial rapist to murderer. We see McGee's savvy, guile, and physical prowess as he works methodically to locate Allen and eventually make the recovery. As is thematic in many of the McGee books, however, he pays a heavy price for the successful recovery. Throughout the series, in fact, it is debatable as to whether McGee ever makes a recovery in which the gain outweighs the costs.

The "Deep Blue Good-by" occurs when some of the blue gem stones that McGee is trying to recover are spilled on a boat during a scuffle with Junior Allen and fall to the bottom of the ocean. The title phrase is not used in this book, although all of the book phrases are used starting in his third book, A Purple Place for Dying.

In the end, Travis McGee recovered five gem stones for about $22,668. McGee took $1,668 for expenses and $1,000 as a recovery fee from Cathy Kerr.

== Film adaptation ==
When Travis McGee arrived on the big screen in 1970 with Darker Than Amber, starring Rod Taylor, the film received favorable reviews from Roger Ebert and other critics, but the film did not develop into a series. Other actors considered for the role were Jack Lord and Robert Culp. John McDonald's favourites were Steve McQueen or Vic Morrow.

The 1983 TV movie Travis McGee: The Empty Copper Sea starred Sam Elliott. It relocated McGee to California, abandoning the Florida locales central to the novel.

In 1967, author MacDonald refused permission for a television series about Travis McGee, believing that people would stop reading the novels were Travis McGee regularly on television.

A film version of The Deep Blue Good-by, directed by Oliver Stone with Leonardo DiCaprio as Travis McGee, was in development with a tentative release date of 2011 or 2012. In April 2010, it was announced that the film's title was changed to Travis McGee. In April 2011, it was announced that Paul Greengrass was interested in directing the film. As of February 2014, this has not materialized and the film remains listed as in development. On March 4, 2014, James Mangold was attached to direct the film which DiCaprio will produce with Jennifer Davisson-Killoran and Amy Robinson. Dana Stevens and Kario Salem wrote the first draft. On July 15, Christian Bale was attached to play the title role for the film The Deep Blue Good-by with screenplay by Dennis Lehane. On February 25, 2015, it was reported that Rosamund Pike had landed the female lead in the film. On August 24, the production was shelved due to Bale's knee injury.
