= The Scarlet Ruse =

1972 novel by John D. MacDonald

- First edition cover
- Author: John D. MacDonald
- Language: English
- Series: Travis McGee
- Genre: Mystery
- Publisher: Fawcett Publications
- Publication date: 1972
- Publication place: United States
- Media type: Print (paperback)
- Preceded by: A Tan and Sandy Silence
- Followed by: The Turquoise Lament

The Scarlet Ruse (1972) is the fourteenth novel in the Travis McGee series by John D. MacDonald. The plot revolves around McGee's investigation into some extremely valuable rare postage stamps which have been stolen. McGee investigates the problem of Hirsh Fedderman's missing stamps on behalf of his friend and sidekick Meyer. By the end of the book, McGee has put himself and Meyer in mortal peril.

The character Willy Nucci, who is introduced in this book, reappears in the final McGee book, The Lonely Silver Rain.
