= The Last One Left =

1967 novel by John D. MacDonald

- First edition (h/b)
- Author: John D. MacDonald
- Cover artist: Patricia Saville
- Language: English
- Genre: Mystery
- Publisher: Fawcett (p/b); Doubleday (h/b)
- Publication date: 1967
- Publication place: United States
- Media type: Print (paperback)
- ISBN: 978-0-449-13958-5

The Last One Left (1967) is a mystery novel by John D. MacDonald. The plot is similar to the notorious real-life events on the sailing ship Bluebelle when, in 1961, the captain killed his wife and four passengers and set a surviving child adrift to die, all in an unsuccessful attempt to cash in his wife's life insurance policy.

The book's subtitle is A story about money and dying, and it is written on several different levels. Throughout the plot are subtle discourses on what it means to have a "good" life, how people deal with stress and uncertainty, and at what point will someone reach out for healthy human contact, or else take self-interest as their highest goal. The Last One Left has been described as one of MacDonald's longest and most complex works.

The story largely takes place in southern Florida and the Bahamas, and is similar to many of the author's better-known stories starring adventurer Travis McGee. The book is in fact dedicated to McGee "who lent invaluable support and encouragement," and a named runabout motorboat later appears in the McGee novel Pale Gray for Guilt.

It was originally published in 1967, appearing in paperback by Fawcett (reprinted 1981) and in hardcover by Doubleday.

== Plot summary ==
A yacht explodes in the Bahamas, apparently killing six people and leaving its burned captain temporarily marooned on a small island. Sam Boylston, an attorney from Texas and the brother of one of the victims, investigates the circumstances, as does Raoul Kelly, a newspaper reporter. As the plot develops it becomes apparent that one person is ruthlessly manipulating events, but proving guilt appears impossible.

From internal evidence the action occurs in late May and early June, circa 1965 (e.g., the 1961 Bay of Pigs Invasion is mentioned but the Bahamian dollar, introduced in 1966, is not yet in circulation).
