= Ed Waters =

American screenwriter

- Born: September 23, 1930; New York City, New York, United States
- Died: October 30, 2004 (aged 74); Santa Monica, California, United States
- Occupations: Television writer, screenwriter

Ed Waters (September 23, 1930 – October 30, 2004) was an American writer for film and television.

He co-wrote Sorority Girl, wrote an episode of the television series The Lieutenant, and won an Emmy Award in 1976.

== Filmography ==
=== Films ===
Year	Film	Credit	Notes
1957	Sorority Girl	Written By	Co-Wrote screenplay with "Leo Lieberman"
1961	Man-Trap	Screenplay By	Based on the short story " " by "John D. MacDonald"
1967	The Caper of the Golden Bulls	Screenplay By	Co-Wrote screenplay with "David Moessinger", Based on the novel "The Caper of the Golden Bulls" by "William P. McGivern"
1970	Darker Than Amber	Screenplay By	Based on the novel "Darker than Amber" by "John D. MacDonald"
1974	Bad Men of the West	Screenplay By	
1981	The Intruder Within	Written By	Television Movie
1983	Murder 1, Dancer 0	Written By	Television Movie

=== Television ===
Year	TV Series	Credit	Notes
1958	Richard Diamond, Private Detective	Writer	1 Episode
1960	Johnny Midnight	Writer	4 Episodes
1962	Surfside 6	Writer	2 Episodes
1962–73	Insight	Writer	11 Episodes
1963	Kraft Television Theatre	Writer	1 Episode
1963	The Lieutenant	Writer	1 Episode
1963	Sam Benedict	Writer	1 Episode
1965–67	Combat!	Writer	2 Episodes
1966	Court Martial	Writer	2 Episodes
1966	Run For Your Life	Writer	1 Episode
1967	The Virginian	Writer	1 Episode
1970	The Young Lawyers	Writer	1 Episode
1970–72	Mannix	Writer	3 Episodes
1971–73	The F.B.I.	Writer	11 Episodes
1972	The Sixth Sense	Writer, Story Editor	3 Episodes
1973–75	Kung Fu	Writer, Executive Story Consultant	Multiple Episodes
1975	Caribe	Write	1 Episode
1975–76	Bronk	Writer, Creator	
1975–77	Police Story	Writer, Executive Story Consultant	43 Episodes
1975–78	Baretta	Writer, Producer	
1983–84	T. J. Hooker	Writer, Producer	21 Episodes
1984	The Mississippi	Writer, Producer	1 Episode
1985–86	Miami Vice	Supervising Producer	21 Episodes
1986–88	The Equalizer	Writer, Supervising Producer, Executive Producer	44 Episodes
1989	Jake and the Fatman	Writer, Executive Producer	10 Episodes
