= The Quick Red Fox =

1964 novel by John D. MacDonald

- First edition cover
- Author: John D. MacDonald
- Language: English
- Series: Travis McGee
- Genre: Mystery
- Publisher: Fawcett Publications
- Publication date: September 29, 1964
- Publication place: United States
- Media type: Print (paperback)
- Pages: 160
- Preceded by: A Purple Place for Dying
- Followed by: A Deadly Shade of Gold

The Quick Red Fox (1964) is the fourth novel in the Travis McGee series by John D. MacDonald. In it, McGee is hired to aid a fictitious Hollywood star named Lysa Dean who is being blackmailed with revealing photographs.

The New York Times called it "fast moving, hard hitting."

It was issued in hardback in 1974.

== Summary ==
The back of the book reads, "From all that Travis McGee could gather, it must have been one hell of a party. Four languid days and all the booze they could drink...Ten playful people swinging wild and free, getting drunk, getting bored, swapping partners in the warmth of sun on naked bodies, miles from civilization. --- Miles from civilization - and 300 feet from a very good camera with a telephoto lens. The star attraction was a woman named Lysa Dean. --- It was a blackmail set-up as old as the hills. McGee - waterfront gypsy - did not want to touch the deal with a ten-foot pole. Except there was another woman involved, a lovely, longing, tender woman whose life was slowly draining away into disaster..."

== Themes ==
The title phrase, "The Quick Red Fox" is mentioned at two places in the book referred to Lysa Dean, the movie star that Travis McGee is employed by.

The first mention on page 16 reads, "With her head slightly bowed, looking up at me through her lashes, the gold-red weight of hair at the right side of her face had swung slightly forward. Suddenly I knew what she reminded me of. A vixen. A quick red fox." The second mention is on page 155, "The quick red fox stared at me with foxy eyes..."

Travis McGee is given an advance of $5,000 for expenses and once his mission is complete, Lysa Dean gave McGee an envelope with $10,000 cash. Lysa Dean provided Dana Holtzer to assist Travis McGee during his work. Although Travis is romantically involved, there isn't an indication that the interest extends beyond the book.

Lysa Dean makes an appearance in Free Fall in Crimson to help Travis solve another case.

McGee's friend Meyer, a frequent side character in the other novels, is briefly mentioned in the book, but does not have any part in the story.

This is the first book that mentions Travis McGee's preference for gin. He drinks Plymouth Gin with bitters and in later books prefers Boodles Gin. Previous to this book, Travis McGee generally prefers a generic "Good Bourbon."
