= F18 =

F18, F-18 or F.XVIII may refer to:

== Transportation and military ==
- McDonnell Douglas F/A-18 Hornet, an American all-weather carrier-capable multirole fighter jet
  - Boeing F/A-18E/F Super Hornet, a more advanced derivative of the F/A-18 Hornet
- F-18 (Michigan county highway), a road in the United States
- Fokker F.XVIII, a 1932 Dutch airliner
- HMS Zulu (F18), a 1937 British Royal Navy Tribal-class destroyer
- Italian submarine F18, an Italian Regia Marina (Royal Navy) submarine in commission from 1917 to 1929

== Other uses ==
- Fluorine-18 (F-18), an unstable isotope of fluorine
- Slip F-18, fictional anchorage for the houseboat in the novel series starting with The Deep Blue Good-by
- Formula 18, a class of catamaran
- F18, a block in chapter V of ICD-10 for "Mental and behavioural disorders due to use of volatile solvents"
