= The Dreadful Lemon Sky =

1975 novel by John D. MacDonald

- First edition hardcover
- Author: John D. MacDonald
- Language: English
- Series: Travis McGee
- Genre: Mystery
- Publisher: Fawcett Publications
- Publication date: 1975
- Publication place: United States
- Media type: Print (paperback)
- Preceded by: The Turquoise Lament
- Followed by: The Empty Copper Sea

The Dreadful Lemon Sky (1975) is the sixteenth novel in the Travis McGee series by John D. MacDonald. It is the 87th novel in The Top 100 Crime Novels of All Time as compiled by the Mystery Writers of America (it is not included in the U.K. version of the list).

== Plot ==
Carrie, an old friend of the hero, Travis McGee, arrives at his houseboat, the Busted Flush. She has a suitcase full of suspicious money. Carrie asks Travis to keep it safe for her for two weeks and to send it to her sister if she does not return. For his troubles, McGee can keep $10,000.

A fortnight passes and Carrie doesn't return. McGee investigates and learns she died in a traffic accident but he believes that she has been murdered. His investigation leads him to an apartment complex full of singles presided over by a landlord called 'Big Daddy'. He also meets the newly widowed Cindy Birdsong, who becomes his new romantic interest.

== Themes ==
In typical fashion, MacDonald includes the book's title phrase in the story. In this edition, the reader waits until Page 267 of the 272 page paperback version for the passage:

The horizon's were whiskey-stained, and the sky above was a pallid saffron instead of blue. The bleared sun made harsh studio lighting on the parking lot scene. And Harry Hascomb saw Captain Scorf's horrid death under the dreadful lemon sky.

The book does not make an indication of whether McGee relayed the illicit money to Carrie Milligan's sister or how much he kept for himself.
