= A Tan and Sandy Silence =

1971 novel by John D. MacDonald

- First edition cover
- Author: John D. MacDonald
- Language: English
- Series: Travis McGee
- Genre: Mystery
- Publisher: Fawcett Publications
- Publication date: 1971
- Publication place: United States
- Media type: Print (paperback)
- Preceded by: The Long Lavender Look
- Followed by: The Scarlet Ruse

A Tan and Sandy Silence (1971) is the thirteenth novel in the Travis McGee series by John D. MacDonald. The plot begins with Harry Broll, husband of McGee's longtime friend Mary, shows up at his houseboat The Busted Flush with a gun, threatening McGee and accusing him of hiding Mary aboard. The rest of the novel involves McGee's search for Mary.

== Themes ==
The title phase, "A Tan and Sandy Silence" is not mentioned verbatim in the book. However, the title is referenced on Page 191 of the first edition, "...a message without sound. A sandy, tan farewell."

McGee's sidekick, Meyer, plays a frequent, but small part in this book as McGee assumes a different identity, "Gavin Lee" while spending most of the book away from his normal home in Slip F-18 at Bahia Mar Yacht Basin in Fort Lauderdale, Florida in favor of the hot April climate of the island nation of Grenada near Grand Anse Beach.
