= A Purple Place for Dying =

Book by John D. MacDonald

- First edition cover
- Author: John D. MacDonald
- Language: English
- Series: Travis McGee
- Genre: Mystery
- Publisher: Fawcett Publications
- Publication date: June 6, 1964
- Publication place: United States
- Media type: Print (paperback)
- Pages: 158
- ISBN: 978-0-449-22438-0
- OCLC: 34612267
- Preceded by: Nightmare in Pink
- Followed by: The Quick Red Fox

A Purple Place for Dying (1964) is the third novel in the Travis McGee series by John D. MacDonald.

== Plot summary ==
McGee is drawn away from his usual haunt of Florida by a job offer from Mona Yeoman, who suspects that her estranged husband has stolen from her considerable trust fund. Before the investigation begins, Mona is murdered before McGee's eyes by an unseen gunman. By the time he summons the police to the scene, her body has disappeared. McGee then sets out to solve her murder.

The back of the first edition reads, "McGee did not like Mona Fox Yeoman. She seemed artificial and self-important. She was provocative rather than seductive, a dare more than a desire. She made a man want to shake her up, to mat that twenty-five dollar hairdo and knock that lady-of-the-manor style of hers on its can. --- But nobody ever would. Because in one minute she was a big creamy bitch standing right next to McGee - and suddenly she was fallen cooling flesh skittering into the dust with a hole as big as your fist through her wishbone. For McGee that should have been it. The client was dead. No fee. No tears. Forget it, bot. Pick up and pack out. --- Yeah. Sure. You better believe it. --- Not McGee."

The book takes place in "Esmeralda County." The state is not mentioned, but it states that the county is fairly populous. There is an Esmeralda County in Nevada, but it is the least populated county in Nevada. Other geographic references in the book, such as the Phoenix airport, seem to indicate the book takes place in Arizona.

== Popular culture ==
Although Tales from Margaritaville was published by Jimmy Buffett in 1989, he wrote an updated preface published in 2002. In it he tells a story of finding a copy of A Purple Place for Dying at a flea market in Huahine in French Polynesia. Jimmy Buffett writes, "Six thousand miles away from slip F-18 at the Bahia Mar yacht basin in Ft. Lauderdale, I read the opening lines. That afternoon, leaning against a palm tree, I finished the book, and as beautiful as paradise was, Travis McGee had rekindled my love for the quirky and insane things that were Florida to me, and I missed them."

Although Buffett refers to McGee in Florida, this Travis McGee novel does not take place in Florida, but rather in the American West.
