= Cinnamon Skin =

Cinnamon Skin may refer to:

- Cinnamon Skin (novel), a 1982 novel by John D. MacDonald
- Cinnamon Skin (film), a 1953 Mexican drama film
