= The Long Lavender Look =

1970 novel by John D. MacDonald

- First edition cover
- Author: John D. MacDonald
- Language: English
- Series: Travis McGee
- Genre: Mystery
- Publisher: Fawcett Publications
- Publication place: United States
- Media type: Print (paperback)
- Preceded by: Dress Her in Indigo
- Followed by: A Tan and Sandy Silence

The Long Lavender Look (1970) is the twelfth novel in the Travis McGee series by John D. MacDonald. After the preceding book, Dress Her in Indigo, which was largely set in Mexico, The Long Lavender Look not only returns to McGee's usual haunt of Florida, but is almost entirely set in one tiny town deep in the rural part of the state.

The plot begins when McGee and Meyer are driving late at night down a deserted Florida highway, when a young woman, barefoot and clad only in a nightgown, dashes across the road just in front of the car. McGee swerves and just barely misses her, but his car is thrown into ten feet of swamp water. Soon after and to their surprise, McGee and Meyer find themselves arrested, and McGee charged with murder.

As it turns out, the scantily clad young woman is one of the main characters, an extremely strong and deadly woman named Lilo Perris. McGee's got his hands full in this tale. There's a bad guy, or gal, at every twist and turn.
