= A Deadly Shade of Gold =

1965 novel by John D. MacDonald

- First edition cover
- Author: John D. MacDonald
- Language: English
- Series: Travis McGee
- Genre: Crime
- Published: February 4, 1965
- Publisher: Fawcett Publications
- Publication place: United States
- Media type: Print (paperback)
- ISBN: 978-0-449-22442-7
- OCLC: 35854700
- Preceded by: The Quick Red Fox
- Followed by: Bright Orange for the Shroud

A Deadly Shade of Gold (1965) is the fifth novel in the Travis McGee series by John D. MacDonald. The plot revolves around a solid gold Aztec statuette, and takes McGee from his home of Florida to Mexico and Los Angeles. The cover bills this novel as a "double-length adventure" and is about twice as many pages as the previous Travis McGee novels.
