= Dress Her in Indigo =

1969 novel by John D. MacDonald

- First edition cover
- Author: John D. MacDonald
- Language: English
- Series: Travis McGee
- Genre: Mystery
- Publisher: Fawcett Publications
- Publication date: 1969
- Publication place: United States
- Media type: Print (paperback)
- Preceded by: The Girl in the Plain Brown Wrapper
- Followed by: The Long Lavender Look

Dress Her in Indigo (1969) is the eleventh novel in the Travis McGee series by John D. MacDonald.

== Plot synopsis ==
McGee investigates what happened to a young woman, Beatrice "Bix" Bowie, on behalf of her father, Harlan Bowie, after she disappears into the expatriate subculture of hippies and drug addicts in Oaxaca, Mexico, and is found dead. McGee interacts with several characters to track down the true story of Bix and her four now-missing companions, Walter "Rocko" Rockland, Jerome Nesta, Mindy McLeen, and Carl Sessions. McLeen's father Wally is in Oaxaca on his own search McGee's sidekick Meyer, a family friend of the Bowies, convinced McGee to investigate, and joins McGee in Mexico.

== Theme ==
The title phrase "Dress Her in Indigo" is found on page 244 of the first edition when one of the characters states, "Look at how splendid that color is for her. It makes those deep blue eyes look almost deep violet. I will dress her in indigo, and in the good blues and greens and grays." This the only book in the series that uses a verb in the title (dress).
