= Nightmare in Pink =

1964 novel by John D. MacDonald

- First edition
- Author: John D. MacDonald
- Language: English
- Series: Travis McGee
- Genre: Mystery
- Publisher: Fawcett Publications
- Publication date: May 21, 1964
- Publication place: United States
- Media type: Print (paperback)
- Pages: 143
- OCLC: 34099585
- Preceded by: The Deep Blue Good-by
- Followed by: A Purple Place for Dying

Nightmare in Pink is the second novel in the Travis McGee series written by John D. MacDonald. It was published concurrently with the first book in the series, The Deep Blue Good-by. In Nightmare in Pink, McGee is asked by a friend from his military days to help his sister Nina in the investigation of her fiancé's death and the large sum of money involved. The book's title is a reference to the inclusion of hallucinogenic drugs as a plot device in the climax. Much of the action takes place in New York City and upstate New York, a departure from McGee's usual haunts in Florida.

== Plot ==
The book starts with Travis McGee meeting Nina Gibson, sister of Mike Gibson, an old friend of McGee's. Travis described a story of being on leave while Mike stayed behind. When McGee returned, Mike Gibson was severely injured. McGee feels guilty that this happened to Mike when it should have happened to him and he helps Nina out of that guilt. Nina's fiancé, Howard Plummer, has died and with a fair amount of money. McGee plans to track this down and return it to Nina.

The book runs fourteen chapters and does not mention the phrase, "Nightmare in Pink," although that phrase refers to McGee's experience on the hallucinatory drugs that he is given while inside a mental institution trying to foil the plot.

== Sources ==
- Merril, Hugh (2000). The Red Hot Typewriter: The Life and Times of John D. MacDonald. Thomas Dunne Books/St. Martin's Minotaur. ISBN 978-0-312-20905-6.
- Geherin, David (1982). John D. MacDonald. F. Ungar Pub. Co. ISBN 978-0-8044-2232-1.
