= Travis McGee =

Fictional character

- First appearance: The Deep Blue Good-by
- Last appearance: The Lonely Silver Rain
- Created by: John D. MacDonald
- Portrayed by: Rod Taylor; Sam Elliott

In-universe information
- Gender: Male
- Occupation: Salvage Consultant
- Nationality: Irish-American

Travis McGee is a fictional character, created by American mystery writer John D. MacDonald. McGee is neither a police officer nor a private investigator; instead, he is a self-described "salvage consultant" who recovers others' property for a fee of 50 percent. McGee appeared in 21 novels, from The Deep Blue Good-by, first published in 1964, to The Lonely Silver Rain in 1985. In 1980, the McGee novel The Green Ripper won a National Book Award in a one-year Mystery category. All 21 books have the theme of a color in the title, one of the earliest examples of detective/mystery fiction series to have a 'title theme' (e.g., the first nine novels by Ellery Queen, the Sue Grafton 'alphabet' series; Janet Evanovich's 'number' series of Stephanie Plum books, etc.).

== Profile ==
Travis McGee lives on a 52-foot houseboat dubbed The Busted Flush. The boat is named after the circumstances in which he won the boat in what McGee describes as a "poker siege" of 30 hours of intensive effort in Palm Beach—the run of luck started with a bluff of four hearts (2-3-7-10) and a club (2), which created a "busted flush," as described in Chapter 3 of The Deep Blue Good-by. The books are all narrated by McGee, writing in the first-person past-tense. The boat is generally docked at slip F-18 at Bahia Mar Marina, Fort Lauderdale, Florida. A self-described "beach bum" who "takes his retirement in installments," McGee prefers to take on new cases only when the spare cash (besides a reserve fund) in a hidden safe in the Flush runs low. McGee also owns a custom 1936 vintage Rolls-Royce that had been converted into a pickup truck by some previous owner long before he bought it, and another previous owner painted it "that horrid blue." McGee named it Miss Agnes, after one of his elementary school teachers whose hair was the same shade.

McGee's business card reads "Salvage Consultant," and most business comes to him by word of mouth. His clients are usually people who have been deprived of something important and/or valuable, typically by unscrupulous or illegal means, and have no way to regain it lawfully. McGee's usual fee is half the value of the item (if recovered) with McGee risking expenses, and potential clients who object to such a seemingly high fee are reminded that getting back half of something is better than owning all of nothing. Although the missing items are usually tangible (e.g., rare stamps or jewels), in several books McGee is asked to locate a missing person; in one, the stolen property is a client's reputation. In several instances, he shows a marked propensity to exact revenge, usually for the ill-treatment or death of one of his close friends.

Physically, McGee is a tall, tanned, sandy-haired man with pale gray eyes. Several books hint (or explicitly state) that he is a U.S. Army veteran of the Korean War. However, later books are less precise about exactly when he served. In two of the later novels, The Green Ripper and Cinnamon Skin, there are implications that his military service was during the Vietnam War rather than the Korean. In The Lonely Silver Rain, he visits a bank safe-deposit box in which he keeps a few precious keepsakes, including photos of his father, mother, and brother, "all long dead," and he mentions that the box also contains his Silver Star, Purple Heart, and honorable discharge certificate, all awarded by the U.S. Army to "Sergeant McGee." He also has a daughter named Jean, unknown to him until she reveals herself in The Lonely Silver Rain as the result of a long-ago love affair. He was a standout college football player (a defensive linebacker.), but says in A Deadly Shade of Gold that he never played professional football due to a knee injury. However, in The Turquoise Lament he admits to a sports trivia fan that he played professional football for a couple of seasons before his knees were wrecked in a tackle by an opponent from the Detroit Lions.

Despite his age, he retains the quickness and agility of a professional athlete. He stands 6′4″ (1.93 m) tall and, although deceptively unimposing at his "fighting weight" of 205 pounds (93 kg), he is much stronger than he looks, with thick wrists and long arms; occasionally, a more perspicacious adversary notes these features when deciding whether to tangle with him. McGee purposely cultivates an image of being uncoordinated, shambling, and clumsy, but has superb reflexes and muscle memory. He has a 33-inch waist, wears a size 46 long jacket, and a shirt with a 17 1/2″ neck and 34″ arms. McGee often discusses his fitness regimen, usually in terms of regaining his fitness after a lazy period: swimming and sprinting are frequently mentioned. At one time, he was a pipe smoker, but eventually gave it up in order to maintain his physical fitness. As a martial arts strategy, he often covers his face and blocks punches with his arms and elbows to lull and tire his opponent while studying that opponent's fighting style. In the final novel, McGee is described as practicing the Chinese art of t'ai chi ch'uan.

McGee's early life and family are deliberately left undeveloped. Among the few explicit mentions of family are a memory of attending a Chicago parade with his father as a boy, and a brother with whom he planned to go into business after his military service. The brother was apparently swindled out of his savings in a scam involving a woman and a male accomplice and committed suicide; it is strongly hinted that Travis subsequently killed the woman and her partner. McGee's ethnicity is Irish-American; his father's first name is never given, but his mother's maiden name is given as Mary Catherine Devlin.

While McGee notes in Free Fall in Crimson (1981) that he has a history of womanizing, having "cut a wide swath through a wall of female flesh," he is honest and cynical enough to understand what this says about himself. This is a part of his introspective nature that frequently appears throughout the series, with observations about society around him, with particular notice paid to the changing Florida environment. McGee's cynical image of himself, some variation of which appears in every book in the series, is as a knight in rusty armor with a broken lance and swaybacked steed, fighting for what he fears are outdated or unrealistic ideals—these are clearly allusions to Don Quixote. In his romantic view of the world (as well as several other similarities), he bears a resemblance to Robert B. Parker's Spenser.

Professor Hugh Merrill, MacDonald's biographer, suggests that despite McGee being squarely in the hardboiled tradition, the character is nonetheless a marked departure from the typical protagonists in the genre by being a gregarious and essentially likable person rather than a loner. Unlike other fictional detectives such as Raymond Chandler's jaded and world-weary Philip Marlowe, McGee clings to what is important to him: his senses of honor, obligation, and outrage. In a classic commentary in Bright Orange for the Shroud, McGee muses:

Now, of course, having failed in every attempt to subdue the Glades by frontal attack, we are slowly killing it off by tapping the River of Grass. In the questionable name of progress, the state in its vast wisdom lets every two-bit developer divert the flow into drag-lined canals that give him "waterfront" lots to sell. As far north as Corkscrew Swamp, virgin stands of ancient bald cypress are dying. All the area north of Copeland had been logged out, and will never come back. As the glades dry, the big fires come with increasing frequency. The ecology is changing with egret colonies dwindling, mullet getting scarce, mangrove dying of new diseases born of dryness.

This was in a paperback originally published in 1965, when the general public was still not conversant with the concept of environmentalism.

McGee does have a sidekick of sorts in his best friend Meyer, an internationally known and respected economist who lives on a cabin cruiser of his own near McGee's at Bahia Mar, the John Maynard Keynes, and later, after the Keynes is blown up, aboard its replacement, the Thorstein Veblen. There has been some confusion as to whether Meyer is a given name or surname, but it is clear in The Green Ripper when McGee and Meyer are in the hotel room with two federal agents. They refer to him twice as Dr. Meyer and at the second, he says, "Just Meyer, please." In Pale Gray for Guilt, Meyer presents a business card giving his name as "G. Ludweg Meyer," and a letter of introduction beginning "My Dear Ludweg." Whether these show his real name or not is obscured by both items being instruments in an elaborate financial con game. Both of Meyer's boats are jammed full of books and treatises, ranging far beyond simple economic theory. For instance, Meyer is a chess aficionado and amateur psychologist. Meyer serves as McGee's anchor when McGee's own inner compass seems to be skewed, as well as providing the formal education that the street-smart McGee lacks. Meyer has been known to participate in McGee's campaigns on occasion and has come close to being killed more than once as a result. His cover is usually as some sort of academic, though at times he has also played a stockbroker or an entomologist.

Some world-weariness does eventually creep into McGee's character, perhaps because the 1960s Florida in which he originated no longer exists. The only direct indications of his age ever given are comments that he had served in the Korean War and, until the 1980s, he seems ageless. He does at one point refer to having a "birthday ending in zero," which could mean that he was born in 1930. But as the series progresses, minor recurring characters began to drop away and it becomes apparent that McGee himself is getting older, along with his creator. In later novels such as The Green Ripper and Free Fall in Crimson, there is a sense of desperation that the violence in the world is too senseless to be explained and will never end. Much of that dissipates with the ending of The Lonely Silver Rain, which became the final volume when MacDonald died in 1986. (Reports of another final McGee novel, possibly narrated by Meyer, titled A Black Border for McGee and to be published posthumously, have never been confirmed.)

== About the Travis McGee novels ==
MacDonald was already a prolific author of mystery and suspense novels when he decided to create a series character. McGee originally was to be called Dallas McGee, after the city, but after the Kennedy assassination, MacDonald decided that name had too many negative connotations. He was searching for a first name for McGee when a friend suggested that he look at the names of the many Air Force bases in California. MacDonald's attention was caught by Travis Air Force Base in Fairfield, and so he named his character Travis.

Beginning with The Deep Blue Good-by, released in March 1964, each of the 21 McGree novels has a title that incorporates a color. The first three books in the series were published in quick succession, at the rate of one a month, a highly unusual publishing strategy. According to MacDonald, he had earlier written an introductory novel about McGee that he burned as being unsatisfactory. A longtime resident of Sarasota's Siesta Key, MacDonald said he placed McGee on the opposite side of the state to protect his privacy in case the series became popular.

McGee has been called the first great modern Florida adventurer, preceding characters and situations that appeared in novels by authors such as Elmore Leonard, Carl Hiaasen, Paul Levine, Tim Dorsey, James W. Hall, and Les Standiford. Hiaasen specifically acknowledged his debt in an introduction he wrote for a new edition of The Deep Blue Good-by in 1994, commenting that even though MacDonald was then eight years gone, he believed McGee was still around, probably sipping gin on the deck of the Busted Flush and pondering whatever it was that Florida had become or was becoming. Singer/songwriter Jimmy Buffett expressed similar sentiments in the lyrics of the song "Incommunicado." In Salem's Lot by Stephen King, County Sheriff Homer McCaslin berates author Ben Mears's writing. McCaslin tells him to write "Like the guy who writes those Travis McGee stories."

The U.S. Library of Congress's Center for the Book commissioned a short work by MacDonald in the mid-1980s. The resulting essay, "Reading for Survival," is a conversation between McGee and Meyer on the importance of reading. Completed only a few months prior to MacDonald's death, the 26-page essay was released in a limited edition of 5,000 copies in 1987, and was available for a small contribution to the Center for the Book.

Mystery novelist Lee Child wrote the introduction for the Random House Trade Paperback Edition of The Deep Blue Good-by published in 2013.

== Novels ==
1. The Deep Blue Good-by (1964)
2. Nightmare in Pink (1964)
3. A Purple Place for Dying (1964)
4. The Quick Red Fox (1964)
5. A Deadly Shade of Gold (1965)
6. Bright Orange for the Shroud (1965)
7. Darker Than Amber (1966)
8. One Fearful Yellow Eye (1966)
9. Pale Gray for Guilt (1968)
10. The Girl in the Plain Brown Wrapper (1968)
11. Dress Her in Indigo (1969)
12. The Long Lavender Look (1970)
13. A Tan and Sandy Silence (1971)
14. The Scarlet Ruse (1972)
15. The Turquoise Lament (1973)
16. The Dreadful Lemon Sky (1974)
17. The Empty Copper Sea (1978)
18. The Green Ripper (1979)
19. Free Fall in Crimson (1981)
20. Cinnamon Skin (1982)
21. The Lonely Silver Rain (1985)

In addition, the 1966 MacDonald novel The Last One Left carries the author's inscription, "I dedicate this novel to TRAVIS McGEE, who lent invaluable support and encouragement." With much of the action occurring in the boat cruising world of southeastern Florida, it is similar to some of the McGee stories. The book also mentions the Muñequita, a small runabout that McGee later buys in Pale Gray for Guilt.

It has been rumored for years that MacDonald was planning a 22nd book to be titled A Black Border for McGee about the death of his famous character and told from the point of view of his friend Meyer. The MacDonald family has steadfastly denied the rumors and has consistently and vigorously refused offers from other authors to continue the series, feeling that no one could properly capture the tone and voice of MacDonald and McGee.

== Adaptations ==
McGee has twice been translated to cinema and television: Rod Taylor played McGee in Darker Than Amber (1970) and Sam Elliott played him in the television movie of The Empty Copper Sea, entitled Travis McGee (1983). The latter relocates McGee in California, eliminating the Florida locales central to the novels. In addition, Elliott kept his trademark brushy mustache, thoroughly distancing himself from the clean-shaven, brush-cut look McGee maintains in the books. In the first film, Meyer was played by Theodore Bikel; in the second, by Gene Evans.

In 1967, author MacDonald refused permission for a television series about Travis McGee and his cases, feeling people would stop reading the novels were McGee regularly on television. Comedian Dan Rowan, a friend of MacDonald's, had expressed interest in playing the role, but nothing ever materialized.

Robert Petkoff provided the voice of Travis McGee in the majority of the current audio book versions of the novels. The prior abridged series from Random House audio featured Darren McGavin in all but two, Darker Than Amber and Cinnamon Skin, which were read by Kevin Conway.

A film version of The Deep Blue Good-by, directed by Oliver Stone with Leonardo DiCaprio as McGee, was in development with a tentative release date of 2011 or 2012. In April 2010, it was announced that the film's title was changed to Travis McGee. In April 2011, it was announced that Paul Greengrass was interested in directing the film, but in March 2014, James Mangold was attached to direct the film, which DiCaprio would produce along with Jennifer Davisson-Killoran and Amy Robinson. Dana Stevens and Kario Salem wrote the first draft. It was revealed that Christian Bale was slated to play the title role for the film The Deep Blue Good-by with a screenplay by Dennis Lehane, but these plans fell through due to Bale having a knee injury.

== Literary landmark ==
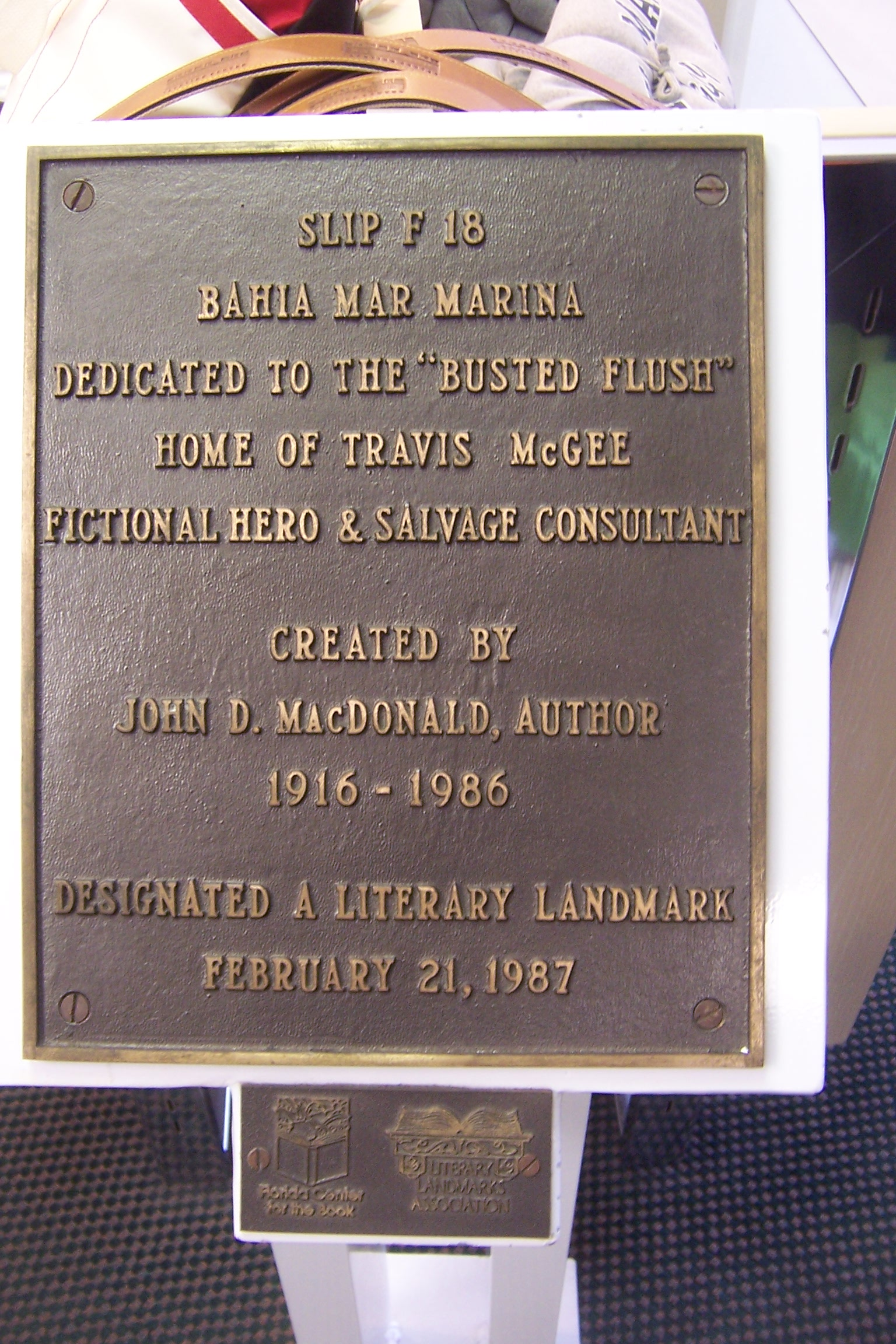

When the U.S. organization Friends of Libraries U.S.A. decided to institute a series of literary landmark plaques analogous to historic landmark markers, the first to be installed was around what would be Slip F-18 in Bahia Mar, the anchorage of the Busted Flush. This was done in February 1987, less than a year after MacDonald's death.

After the remodeling of the Bahia Mar Yachting Center in 2003 to replace fixed docks with floating docks, there no longer existed a Slip F-18. The plaque was remounted on a movable wooden base, which is presently located inside the marina Dockmaster's Office and Gift Shop.
