= One Fearful Yellow Eye =

1966 novel by John D. MacDonald

- First edition cover
- Author: John D. MacDonald
- Language: English
- Series: Travis McGee
- Genre: Mystery
- Publisher: Fawcett Publications
- Publication date: 1966
- Publication place: United States
- Media type: Print (paperback)
- Preceded by: Darker than Amber
- Followed by: Pale Gray for Guilt

One Fearful Yellow Eye (1966) is the eighth novel in the Travis McGee series by John D. MacDonald. The plot revolves around McGee's attempts to aid his longtime friend Glory Doyle in her quest to uncover the truth about her late husband and the blackmail which made over half a million dollars of his fortune disappear. It is largely set in Chicago, rather than the usual McGee haunt of Florida. When Fortner Geis dies, it becomes clear that his fortune was swindled out of him in his last months. McGee tracks down the money and eventually builds a romantic relationship with Fortner's daughter, Heidi Trumbill.

== Themes ==
The title phrase, "One Fearful Yellow Eye," refers to the look of the eye of one of the characters after he has died. It is found on page 174 of the first edition. McGee's sidekick Meyer briefly appears in the book, but does not play a central role. McGee recovers $187,650 from Saul Gorba when he moves to the small town of Bureau, Illinois. He receives about 10% ($18,750) from one of the rightful heirs, Heidi Trumbill.
