= Bright Orange for the Shroud =

1965 novel by John D. MacDonald

- First edition cover
- Author: John D. MacDonald
- Language: English
- Series: Travis McGee
- Genre: Mystery
- Publisher: Fawcett Publications
- Publication date: 1965
- Publication place: United States
- Media type: Print (paperback)
- Pages: 190
- Preceded by: A Deadly Shade of Gold
- Followed by: Darker than Amber

Bright Orange for the Shroud (1965) is the sixth novel in the Travis McGee series by John D. MacDonald. The plot follows McGee as he attempts to salvage the money of friend Arthur Wilkinson after the man is defrauded in a semi-legal confidence scheme involving a land deal.

== Plot ==
While enjoying another installment of his "retirement," Travis McGee is visited by Arthur Wilkinson, who had briefly been part of McGee's circle before leaving to get married. Wilkinson is in terrible physical condition, and collapses as he reaches McGee's boat. With the help of Chookie, who dated Wilkinson for a time, McGee learns that Wilkinson has been bankrupted by a land development scheme in which the partners kept demanding greater and greater shares until Wilkinson's bank account was empty and he was heavily in debt to his friends. He also endured a savage beating from the gang's muscle, a rustic psychopath named Boone Waxwell, and was twice jailed and disgraced on fraudulent charges arranged by the gang.

After spending several weeks nursing Arthur back to health, McGee scouts out the lower-level conspirators and forms a guarded friendship with Vivian Crane, whose husband's law practice has been ruined by rumors of his participation in the scam. McGee also pays a visit to Waxwell at his backwoods home, and barely manages to get away whole after besting Waxwell in a vicious brawl.

McGee determines that the only money remaining from Wilkinson's inheritance is the remainder of Waxwell's share, which is buried in jars around Waxwell's house. Before he can execute the plan, however, Waxwell gets the drop on him outside Vivian Crane's house and leaves him in the back of his car. McGee manages to crawl to a hiding place, where he overhears Waxwell raping Vivian. Waxwell flees the scene when he discovers McGee is missing. McGee goes into the house and finds Vivian has committed suicide with a pistol after killing her husband, who lay in a drunken stupor during her rape. McGee alters the crime scene to create the impression that Waxwell killed both Vivian and her husband, then phones in an anonymous report to the police.

Waxwell, now the target of a statewide manhunt, flees into the swamps. McGee recovers a substantial amount of money from Waxwell's hiding places. Waxwell, by chance, boards the houseboat and holds them at bay with a gun. After a long, tense period in which it becomes likely that Waxwell plans to kill them all after getting clear of the dragnet, the three manage to get the gun away from Waxwell, who accidentally impales himself on a cypress stump while jumping clear of the houseboat. The three leave his body to be discovered by searchers while McGee recovers a last portion of cash from Waxwell's belongings. McGee plans the money as a wedding gift for Chookie and Wilkinson.

== Themes ==
As with all of the Travis McGee novels, the title includes a color that is referenced in the narrative. This book's title refers to the orange bathrobe Vivian Crane puts on before killing herself. McGee comments that this color is not appropriate for death because it is so lifelike.
