= Free Fall in Crimson =

1981 novel by John D. MacDonald

- First edition hardcover
- Author: John D. MacDonald
- Language: English
- Series: Travis McGee
- Genre: Mystery
- Publisher: Fawcett Publications
- Publication date: 1981
- Publication place: United States
- Media type: Print (paperback)
- Preceded by: The Green Ripper
- Followed by: Cinnamon Skin

Free Fall in Crimson (1981) is the nineteenth novel in the Travis McGee series by John D. MacDonald. In the plot McGee sets out to investigate the death of an ailing millionaire, and encounters a motorcycle gang, pornographic movie-makers, and balloonists. The book also revives the character of Lysa Dean from The Quick Red Fox, an early novel in the series. In the finale, McGee's longtime friend Meyer is terrified into submission by the main villain and judges himself a failure because his inaction almost led to disaster. This moral dilemma is resolved in the next novel, Cinnamon Skin.
