= Travis McGee (film) =

- Genre: Drama
- Based on: The Empty Copper Sea by John D. MacDonald
- Written by: Stirling Silliphant
- Directed by: Andrew V. McLaglen
- Starring: Sam Elliott; Gene Evans; Barry Corbin
- Theme music composer: Jerrold Immel
- Country of origin: United States
- Original language: English

Production
- Producer: George Eckstein
- Cinematography: Jack Whitman
- Editor: Richard Bracken
- Running time: 100 minutes
- Production companies: Warner Bros. Television; Hajeno Productions

Original release
- Network: ABC
- Release: May 18, 1983

Travis McGee is a 1983 American TV movie based on the 1978 novel The Empty Copper Sea by John D. MacDonald. It was the second film adaptation of the Travis McGee series. It was made by Warner Bros. Television.

== Plot ==
Cynical private investigator Travis McGee is called on to determine if a missing man is really dead or not; McGee soon finds the answer in a surprising twist ending that almost costs him his life.

== Cast ==
- Sam Elliott as Travis McGee
- Gene Evans as Meyer
- Barry Corbin as Sheriff Hack Ames
- Richard Farnsworth as Van Harder
- Geoffrey Lewis as John Tuckerman
- Amy Madigan as Billy Jean Bailey
- Vera Miles as Julie Lawless
- Katharine Ross as Gretel Howard
- Marshall R. Teague as Nicky Noyes
- Maggie Wellman as Mishy Burns
- Walter Olkewicz as Wright Fletcher

== Production ==
The novel was published in 1978, and became a best seller.

This film was a pilot for a TV series; it made some key changes from the books, including shifting the locale to California and changing the houseboat The Busted Flush into a sailing boat. "We turned our back on a key element in McGee's life because we wanted to have the mobility of a sailboat," said Elliot.

The first writer employed was Stirling Silliphant. Elliot disliked this script, so Alan Sharp was brought in. His script used elements of Copper Sea and another McGee book, The Green Ripper. "I liked the Sharp script best, but ABC rejected it," Elliott said. "There were a couple more writers, and then Kenneth Johnson got hired. He had created The Six Million Dollar Man, The Bionic Woman and The Incredible Hulk, and the script he came up with was about what I'd expected of a man with that background. I resisted and the network backed off."

Eventually, Elliott did as ABC wanted. "It's one thing to beat your head against the wall and get results," he said "It's something else to do it and just get a headache. Eventually, we went back to the Silliphant script and filmed that, with a few additions from the Sharp script. In the end, I just decided to do the best I could, but to do it."

"They changed a lot of things," said Katherine Ross, shortly before the show aired. "But it looks as if it will now go to series because they've commissioned some more scripts - and if that happens, I think they'll revert to the McGee stories. There was a lot of rewriting done on this pilot - Sam did some himself - and at one point he got very depressed. But ABC's response when they saw the pilot was so good that it cheered him up."

"There are some big, big holes in it," Elliott said of the film. "Just because we got it on film after 3 1/2 years doesn't mean anyone was totally pleased with the script." "There seemed to be a lot of resistance on the part of the scriptwriters to using MacDonald's material," said Elliott. "It always dumbfounded me how it could be so difficult to work with such a wealth of material, and in the process lose its essence. The writers seemed to think, 'MacDonald sure wrote some wonderful books, but I can do better.'"

Elliott said that he loved "the humorous and cynical comments about life and the world that MacDonald made through McGee... What there is of that in the show got in because I literally picked up the book, copied it out and said it." "Networks, by and large, could care less about the content of programs [sic], as long as they fill the void between commercials," said Elliot. "At some point, they've got to start giving the public credit for having half a brain."

== Reception ==
The New York Times critic said, "the plot is not entirely convincing and Mr. Elliot has chosen to play McGee in a style so laid back as to be comatose."

The Philadelphia Inquirer writer said, "except for this deplorable loss of atmosphere [the shift of locale], Travis McGee is a telemovie that perhaps comes as close as is possible to capturing the look and style of MacDonald's virile and invincible hero. Sam Elliott is so fittingly cast as McGee, and the grizzled Gene Evans as his savvy old sidekick, Meyer, that the substitution of Pismo Beach for Fort Lauderdale is likely to pass unnoticed by most viewers."

"We should have left McGee in Florida where he belongs," said Elliot. "If I had it to do over, I would have done it in Florida and I wouldn't have put him on a sailboat... I feel as guilty about it as a lot of other people should feel. It's my face up there. I've got to answer all those 'Why did he do that?' questions."
