= Pale Gray for Guilt =

1968 book by John D. MacDonald

- First edition cover
- Author: John D. MacDonald
- Language: English
- Series: Travis McGee
- Genre: Mystery
- Publisher: Fawcett Publications
- Publication date: 1968
- Publication place: United States
- Media type: Print (paperback)
- Preceded by: One Fearful Yellow Eye
- Followed by: The Girl in the Plain Brown Wrapper

Pale Gray for Guilt (1968) is the ninth novel in the Travis McGee series by John D. MacDonald. The plot revolves around McGee's investigation into the death of his close friend Tush Bannon, who he suspects has been murdered because of his refusal to sell his waterfront property to developers. In terms of series continuity, Pale Gray for Guilt is particularly important in that it involves a love interest, Puss Killian, who is central to the final book: The Lonely Silver Rain.

== Synopsis ==
When McGee visits Tush Bannon, his wife Janine and their children at their motel/marina, he finds the business in trouble. Tush explains that the local authorities are making life difficult for him by such means as introducing roadworks on the only access road. Pressure is being put on the Bannons by a well-connected local businessman, Preston LaFrance, to sell to a large corporation that wants to develop the land for industrial use. Most of the income they have left is from a few houseboats, one of which is rented to Arlie Denn and her husband, hippies who make a small living selling handicrafts.

The next time McGee sees Tush, they bump into one another at a bar, where Tush is in conversation with a smart young woman named Mary Smith. He tells McGee that Smith is an agent for an entrepreneur named Gary Santo, who wants to acquire the whole parcel of land. Tush has appealed to both LaFrance and Santo without success; they are not interested in his personal circumstances and are prepared to put him out of business to get what they want. Tush cannot afford to sell his land at the deflated price now being offered. All he can do now is to resume his old job as a salesman.

When McGee next goes to call on the Bannons, he finds the motel and marina closed down, and learns that Tush was found dead on the premises the previous day, apparently having committed suicide by releasing a heavy hoist onto his own head. Suspecting foul play, McGee investigates further and learns that Tush's wife Janine, having been forced to leave the property by bailiffs, has gone to stay with an old friend, Connie Alvarez, and is not yet aware of her husband's death. Satisfied that Tush did not kill himself, McGee begins a campaign to help Janine and her children financially whilst seeking revenge on those whom he holds responsible.

With help from his friend Meyer, McGee builds up an elaborate scam. They con LaFrance into buying the Bannon land at an inflated price and the profits are used to buy Janine shares in Fletchers, a company whose stocks Meyer knows to be over-priced. McGee then obtains an introduction to Gary Santo through Mary Smith, avoiding the latter's sexual advances by pretending to be away setting up a deal. He persuades Santo to invest heavily in Fletchers, thus artificially boosting the share price, selling off Janine's shares when the market peaks. McGee's girlfriend, Puss Killian, also plays a part in the scam, but then disappears, leaving a mysterious note of apology, saying that their affair is at an end.

In the meantime, McGee has been arrested by the local sheriff on suspicion of involvement in Tush Bannon's murder. Testifying against him is Arlie Denn, who witnessed the murder and has been bought off by the murderer, Freddy Hazzard, a junior deputy related to LaFrance. Hazzard, who had set up the suicide scenario after accidentally killing Tush by an over-enthusiastic beating, goes on the run when Arlie changes her story, but reappears later on McGee's boat, The Busted Flush, where he takes Janine hostage and subjects her and McGee to an ordeal of several hours imprisonment, his plan being to sink the boat with them in it and get away on its small speedboat. McGee manages to get free, but is shot in the shoulder by Hazzard, who is then killed by Janine with a blow from a fire extinguisher. Wishing to avoid publicity, McGee and Janine agree to bury Hazzard at sea and they spend some time together on a fake holiday before returning to base, where McGee is confronted by Santo and Smith. Learning how he has been stung, Santo fires Smith, but she quickly loses interest in McGee. A message of explanation from Puss Killian makes him resolve to stay away from women for the foreseeable future, and he is left alone with Meyer to resume his usual way of life.

== Themes ==
The title phase, "Pale Gray for Guilt" is not mentioned directly in the book, but similar phrases are used. In the first edition, on Page 39, Tush Bannon's wife states, "I'm going to look at some nice gray skin. Gray and pale, oily and guilty as hell." Later on Page 183, MacDonald writes, "And I watched the gray appear. That gray like a wet stone. Gray for fright. Gray for guilt. Gray for despair."

McGee procures $60,000 from one of the characters using a Pigeon Drop scheme with the help of Meyer who assumes the semi-pseudonym of "Dr. G. Ludweg Meyer." Later on, Meyer presents McGee with $25,000 in stock gains from investments in Fletcher Industries.
