= The Empty Copper Sea =

1978 novel by John D. MacDonald

- First edition hardcover
- Author: John D. MacDonald
- Language: English
- Series: Travis McGee
- Genre: Mystery
- Publisher: Fawcett Publications
- Publication date: 1978
- Publication place: United States
- Media type: Print (paperback)
- Preceded by: The Dreadful Lemon Sky
- Followed by: The Green Ripper

The Empty Copper Sea (1978) is the 17th novel in the Travis McGee series by John D. MacDonald. In it, McGee looks into the apparent drowning of Hub Lawless in a boating accident. His $2 million insurance policy leads some to believe he has faked his death.

The title of the book is taken from a passage in Chapter 13 (on page 218 of the first printing of the hardcover edition). The sentence reads "I turned my head and saw, beyond the shoulder of my beloved, the empty copper sea, hushed and waiting, as if the world had paused between breaths."

The novel was adapted as the television movie Travis McGee (1983), starring Sam Elliott. The film abandoned the Florida locales in favor of California.

== Plot summary ==
A wealthy landowner/investor named Hub Lawless has disappeared off the west coast of Florida, supposedly fallen overboard during a storm and drowned. The captain of the boat, Van Harder, is blamed, having been found drunk and passed out when the boat returned to shore, but all is not as it appears and the dead man possibly faked his own death and is, instead, living in Mexico with a lover, avoiding the eventual failure of his businesses.

Harder comes to McGee, asking him to salvage his reputation as a boat captain. As Travis's fee is half of the value of what he recovers, Harder has placed a value of $20,000 (roughly $100,000, adjusted for inflation as of 2025) on his "good name" and offers $10,000 to McGee in payments over time to find out the truth of what happened. McGee and Meyer travel to the Gulf Coast of Florida, undercover as investors, to find out the truth of what happened. Over the course of the investigation, McGee meets Gretel, who features prominently in the next book, The Green Ripper.

== Popular culture ==
Jimmy Buffett wrote the song 'Incommunicado' and released it on his Coconut Telegraph album in 1981. The song starts, "Travis McGee's still in Cedar Key, that's what John MacDonald said." Although the book is primarily set in the fictional town in Timber Bay in the real Dixie County, Florida, Travis says "I traced the route in the Waterway Guide all the way up to Cedar Key, which would be the last overnight before Timber Bay." This is strong evidence that this is the book that Jimmy was referring to when he was writing the song considering the book was published in 1978. Cedar Key, Florida is a real place but Travis McGee doesn't actually visit. Van Harder, another character in the book, pilots the Busted Flush from Fort Lauderdale to Timber Bay (with a stop at Cedar Key).

== Books ==
- Merril, Hugh (2000). The Red Hot Typewriter: The Life and Times of John D. MacDonald. Thomas Dunne Books/St. Martin's Minotaur. ISBN 978-0-312-20905-6.
- Geherin, David (1982). John D. MacDonald. F. Ungar Pub. Co. ISBN 978-0-8044-2232-1.
