= The Sixth Sense (American TV series) =

American paranormal thriller television series

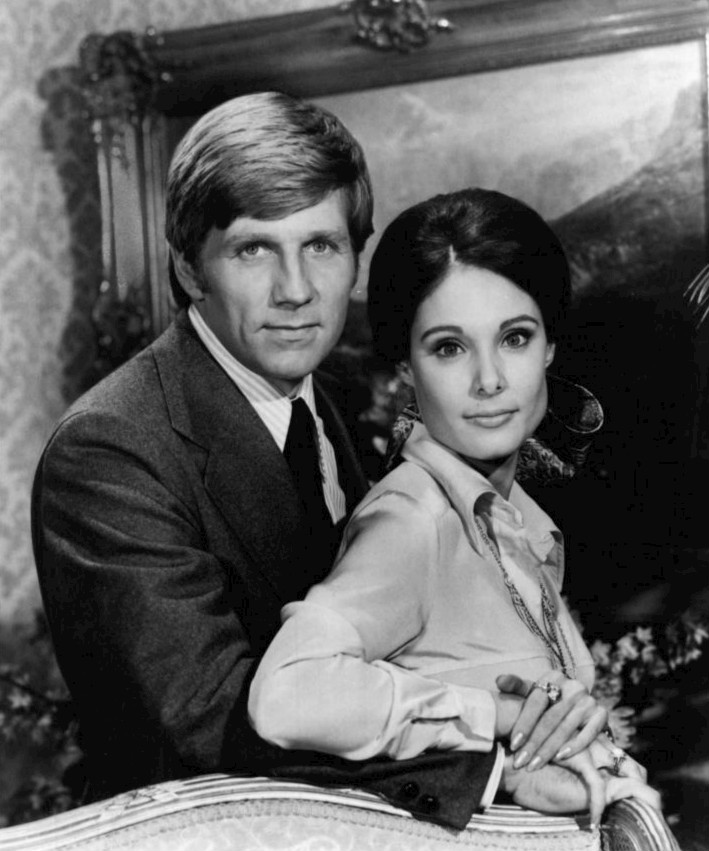
- Genre: Drama/Mystery/Thriller
- Created by: Anthony Lawrence
- Written by: John W. Bloch; Don Ingalls; Anthony Lawrence; Robert Specht; Ed Waters
- Directed by: Jeff Corey; Alan Crosland, Jr. Robert Day; Alf Kjellin; John Newland; Sutton Roley; Barry Shear
- Starring: Gary Collins; Catherine Ferrar; Percy Rodriguez
- Composers: Billy Goldenberg; Robert Prince; David Shire
- Country of origin: United States
- Original language: English
- No. of seasons: 2
- No. of episodes: 25

Production
- Producer: Stanley Shpetner
- Cinematography: Enzo A. Martinelli
- Running time: 60 mins. (approx)

Original release
- Network: ABC
- Release: January 15 – December 23, 1972

The Sixth Sense is an American paranormal thriller television series featuring Gary Collins and Catherine Ferrar. The series was produced by and filmed at Universal Studios, and broadcast by ABC from January 15 to December 23, 1972.

== Development ==
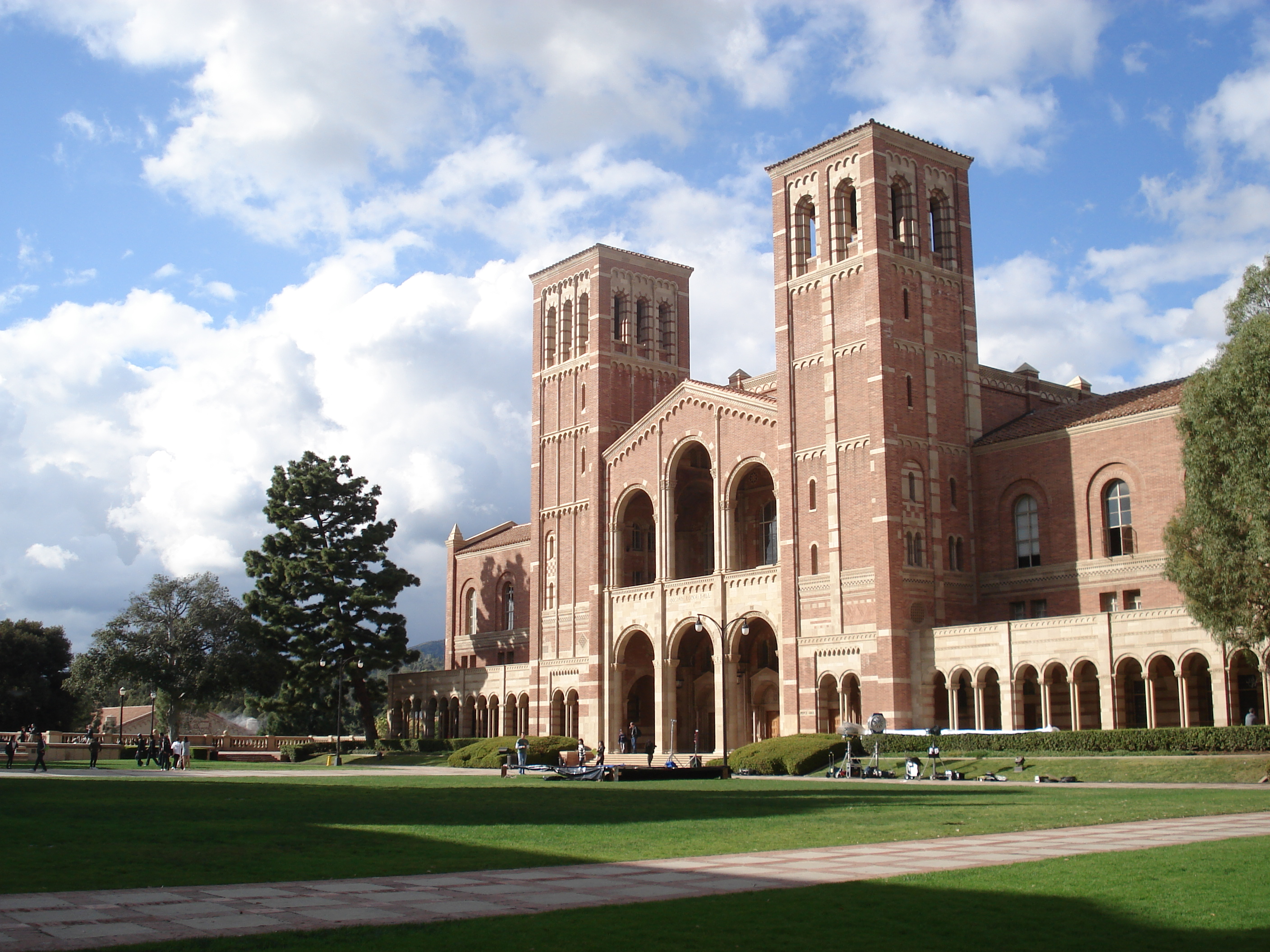
UCLA is where Dr. Darrow conducted psychic research in Sweet, Sweet Rachel.

The Sixth Sense series was based on the 1971 television movie Sweet, Sweet Rachel. That opened with a photo of UCLA's Royce Hall—implying UCLA is where Dr. Darrow is a parapsychology researcher—and with a quote: "'If I had my life to live over, I should devote myself to psychic research rather than psychoanalysis.'—Sigmund Freud."

Its cast included Alex Dreier as Dr. Lucas Darrow (former surgeon and parapsychology researcher), Pat Hingle as Arthur Piper, Louise Latham as Lillian Piper, Steve Ihnat as Dr. Simon Tyler (Psychologist), Brenda Scott as Nora Piper, Chris Robinson as Carey Johnson (Dr. Darrow's blind research assistant), Stefanie Powers as Mrs. Rachel Stanton, Rod McCarey as Paul Stanton, Richard Bull as Lt. Fisher, Mark Tapscott as Henry, John Hillerman as Medical Examiner, William Bryant as Doctor and John Alvin as Surgeon. It was produced by Stan Shpetner, written by Anthony Lawrence and directed by Sutton Roley with music by Laurence Rosenthal. It was filmed at Samuel Goldwyn Studios.

== Synopsis ==
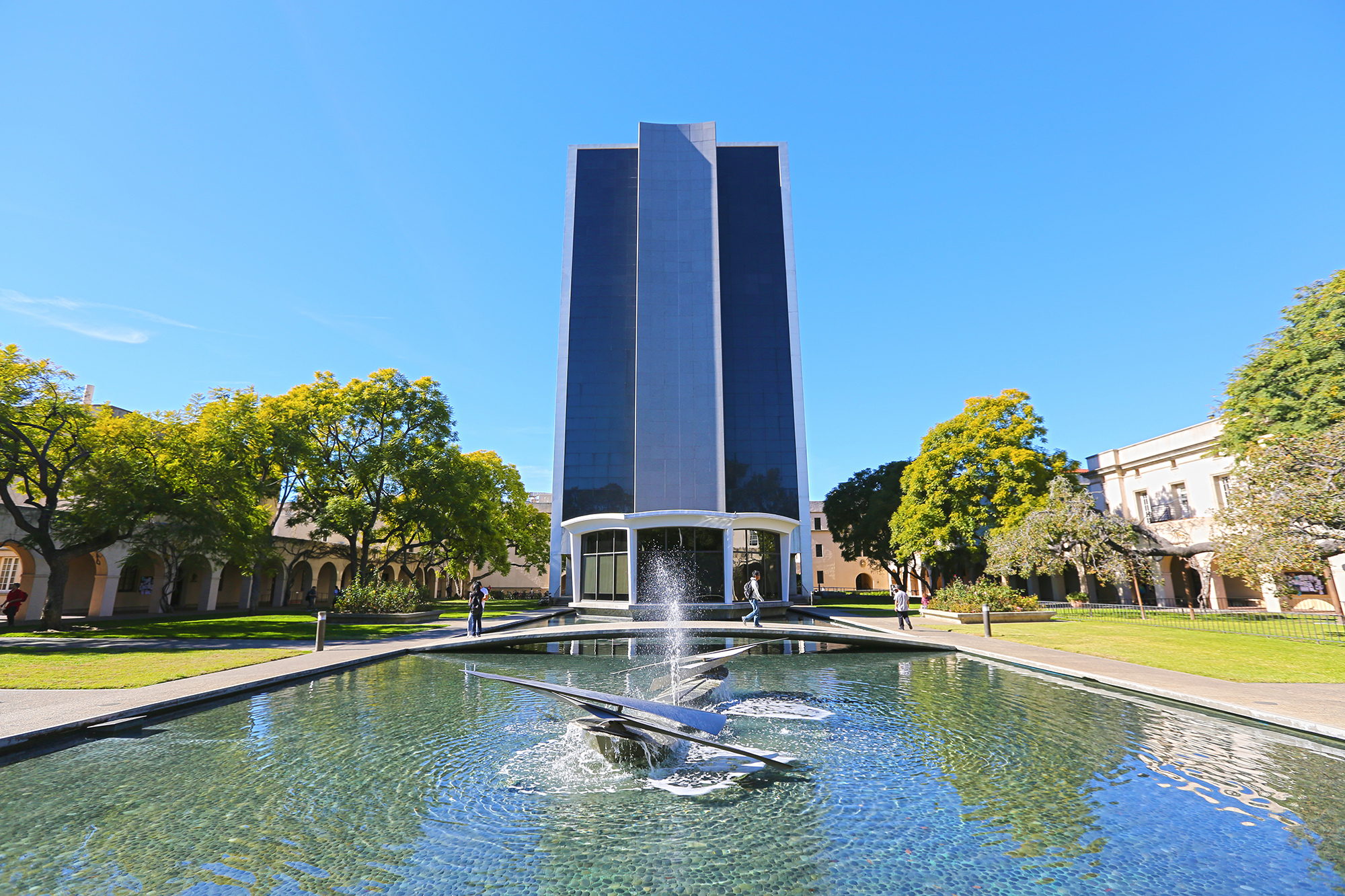
Dr. Michael Rhodes walked by Caltech's Millikan Library in the opening of The Sixth Sense season 1 episodes.

Dr. Michael Rhodes (Collins), a professor of parapsychology who has ESP, and his assistant Nancy Murphy (Ferrar) attempt to solve supernatural crimes and mysteries.

== Production ==
The series, which was broadcast Saturday nights at 10 pm, had tough competition from CBS's Mission: Impossible and NBC's Saturday Night at the Movies. Despite mediocre ratings, The Sixth Sense was renewed for a second season, mainly due to its well-known guest stars. Ratings continued to decline, and ABC canceled The Sixth Sense on November 14, 1972, broadcasting the remaining episodes through December 1972.

Notable among its many guest stars were Joan Crawford, Sandra Dee, Patty Duke, Cloris Leachman, Carol Lynley, Lee Majors, William Shatner, Jane Wyman and Jim Davis.

== Syndication ==
For its syndication release, The Sixth Sense was edited and included with Night Gallery hosted by Rod Serling. As The Sixth Sense was an hour-long show, and the syndicated version of Night Gallery was a half-hour show, the episodes were edited quite severely. Serling's newly added introductions usually covered the introductory scenes and plot point set-ups that had been removed.

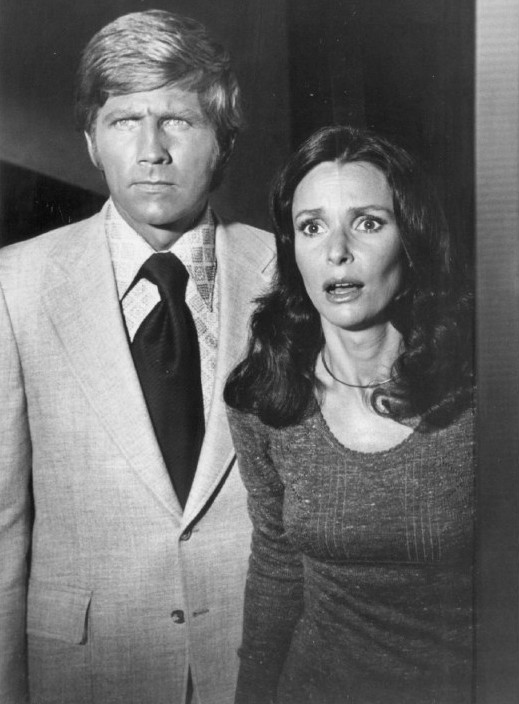
Gary Collins and Susan Strasberg in "Once Upon a Chilling", 1972

== Home media ==
The complete TV series was released in France in October 2014 by Elephant Films. The set is composed of 9 discs with selectable soundtracks in French and English. Though produced in PAL format, it is playable in all regions.

== Episodes ==
The Sixth Sense ran for two seasons starting in 1972, including the television film from October 2, 1971. Each first season episode opened with the quote: "Your sons and daughters will prophesy, Your old men will dream dreams, Your young men will see visions." Old Testament Joel 2:28.

=== Season 1: 1972 ===
The show premiered on January 15, 1972, with the episode "I Do Not Belong to the Human World".

| No. overall | No. in season | Title | Directed by | Written by | Original release date |
|---|---|---|---|---|---|
| 1 | 1 | "I Do Not Belong to the Human World" | Alf Kjellin | Anthony Lawrence | January 15, 1972 |
Rhodes receives a psychic plea for help from an American POW (Kip Niven) who's being tortured in a Viet Cong prison camp during the Vietnam War.
| 2 | 2 | "The Heart That Wouldn't Stay Buried" | Barry Shear | Anthony Lawrence | January 22, 1972 |
An ailing neurosurgeon has a terrifying vision that he will die from the same mysterious disease which claimed the life of his son. Leif Erickson, Michael Murphy, Laraine Day and Jessica Walter all guest star.
| 3 | 3 | "Lady, Lady, Take My Life" | John Badham | Anthony Lawrence | January 29, 1972 |
An official at a research institute who opposed psychic experiments by staff scientists dies mysteriously. Was it a case of murder by telepathy?
| 4 | 4 | "The House That Cried Murder" | Richard Donner | Robert Hamner | February 5, 1972 |
Gail Summer is drawn to a spooky old gothic mansion because of two visions: one of another woman drowning in a bathtub and another even more terrifying- herself drowning in a car. Larry Linville guest stars.
| 5 | 5 | "The Man Who Died at Three and Nine" | Robert Day | Don Ingalls | February 12, 1972 |
Diplomat Paul Crowley is attacked by a powerful psychic force. This force manifests itself in two ways: lapses of memory and visions of a woman drowning.
| 6 | 6 | "Can a Dead Man Strike from the Grave?" | Alf Kjellin | Gene L. Coon | February 26, 1972 |
Edwin Danbury (William Shatner) is tormented by a vision of murder. The killer is an old man long since deceased and the victims are a young couple in love. (With Anne Archer)
| 7 | 7 | "With This Ring, I Thee Kill!" | Robert Day | Robert Collins | March 4, 1972 |
Rhodes fulfills the dying wish of an old friend by examining his daughter's impending marriage to a man (Lee Majors) she only met a month before.
| 8 | 8 | "Witch, Witch, Burning Bright" | John Badham | John W. Bloch | March 11, 1972 |
Judith Eaton becomes convinced that her daughter, Damaris, is the avenging agent of an ancestor who was burned at the stake as a witch.
| 9 | 9 | "Eye of the Haunted" | Jeff Corey | Calvin Clements Sr. | March 18, 1972 |
Rhodes is plagued by apparitions of the woman he once loved--- who was later murdered. Then the deceased woman's lookalike sister becomes the target of the killer.
| 10 | 10 | "Echo of a Distant Scream" | Earl Bellamy | Don Ingalls | April 1, 1972 |
Visions of a ghost horse on a guest ranch begin haunting Paula Norris.
| 11 | 11 | "Whisper of Evil" | Robert L. Collins | Robert L. Collins | April 8, 1972 |
Rhodes struggles to find the sister of a woman in need of a kidney transplant. It appears as though the ailing woman has been having visions of her sister participating with a satanic ritual.
| 12 | 12 | "Shadow in the Well" | – | Anthony Lawrence | April 15, 1972 |
Rhodes comes to the aid of Lisa Wolf, who is frightened by an image of her recently drowned husband- whom Lisa believes she accidentally killed.
| 13 | 13 | "Face of Ice" | Daniel Haller | Don Ingalls | April 22, 1972 |
An amnesiac claims she had a vision of a man shooting a motorcyclist. Then she and Rhodes discover that the shooter in the vision is her husband.

=== Season 2: 1972 ===
The second season of The Sixth Sense started on September 23, 1972, with the episode Coffin, Coffin, in the Sky and had 12 episodes in the season.

| No. overall | No. in season | Title | Directed by | Written by | Original release date |
|---|---|---|---|---|---|
| 14 | 1 | "Coffin, Coffin, in the Sky" | Sutton Roley | Don Ingalls | September 23, 1972 |
A young woman in and out of consciousness, on a flight, has visions of a horse-drawn carriage. She sees herself looking at all the passengers lying in coffins. Dr. Rhodes helps to interpret her visions as problems with the airplane. Originally one hour, it was reduced to 30 minutes for syndication on Night Gallery with the alternate title "Flying Sepulcher of Death".
| 15 | 2 | "Dear Joan: We're Going to Scare You to Death" | John Newland | Jonathan Stone | September 30, 1972 |
Joan Crawford (in her final acting role) plays a woman who stumbles upon a group of ESP enthusiasts who decide to use their abilities to scare her to death. Gary Collins does not appear as Dr. Rhodes in this episode, but as himself in the role of host, introducing the episode and briefly interviewing Crawford in a final epilogue segment to conclude the program.
| 16 | 3 | "Witness Within" | Sutton Roley | Ed Waters | October 7, 1972 |
A young woman begins to see visions in which she is attacked by a man.
| 17 | 4 | "With Affection, Jack the Ripper" | Robert Day | Don Ingalls | October 14, 1972 |
An experiment to determine if ESP can span time proves fatal.
| 18 | 5 | "Once Upon a Chilling" | Sutton Roley | Don Ingalls | October 28, 1972 |
A woman working at a foundation researching cryogenics sees frozen visions of her dead boss.
| 19 | 6 | "Through a Flame Darkly" | John Newland | Dick Nelson | November 4, 1972 |
A woman has visions that cause her to believe a childhood friend is in trouble.
| 20 | 7 | "I Did Not Mean to Slay Thee" | Allen Baron | Ed Waters | November 11, 1972 |
| 21 | 8 | "And Scream by the Light of the Moon, the Moon" | John Newland | John T. Dugan | November 25, 1972 |
A woman returns to her childhood home only to be tormented by visions of her past.
| 22 | 9 | "If I Should Die Before I Wake" | Bernard Girard | John W. Bloch | December 2, 1972 |
When she returns to her old home, Ruth Ames begins to see visions, including that of her long dead daughter Mindy. Guest stars Jane Wyman.
| 23 | 10 | "Five Widows Weeping (AKA Five Women Weeping)" | Allen Baron | Anthony Lawrence | December 9, 1972 |
The new wife of a wealthy family's scion sees vision of his death.
| 24 | 11 | "Gallows in the Wind" | Alan Crosland, Jr | Don Ingalls | December 16, 1972 |
A woman has visions of death during a hurricane.
| 25 | 12 | "The Eyes That Wouldn't Die" | Robert Day | David P. Harmon | December 23, 1972 |
When her sight is restored, Kathy sees visions of murder.

== Paperback tie-in fiction ==
Two books based on the series were released by Tempo Books. Uniquely, book #1, Witch, Witch Burning Bright by John W. Bloch (1972), published while first run episodes were still airing, was neither an original novel nor an episode novelization, but rather a simple reproduction of his teleplay for the eighth episode of the series (see above). Idiosyncratically, that precedent was abandoned with book #2, In the Steps of the Master by then-up-and-coming fantasist Marion Zimmer Bradley (1973), which was a more traditional original TV tie-in novel utilizing the show's characters and concepts, published shortly after the show's cancellation.
