= Darker than Amber =

1966 novel by John D. MacDonald

- First edition cover
- Author: John D. MacDonald
- Language: English
- Series: Travis McGee
- Genre: Mystery
- Publisher: Fawcett Publications
- Publication date: 1966
- Publication place: United States
- Media type: Print (paperback)
- Preceded by: Bright Orange for the Shroud
- Followed by: One Fearful Yellow Eye

Darker than Amber (1966) is the seventh novel in the Travis McGee series by John D. MacDonald. The plot begins when McGee and his close friend Meyer are fishing underneath a bridge and a young woman, bound and weighted, is thrown over the bridge. It was adapted into a 1970 film of the same name.

A novella of the same title, adapted from the book, was published in Cosmopolitan, in the April 1966 issue.

== Themes ==
The title phrase "Darker Than Amber" appears on page 31 of the first edition when Travis McGee is referring to the eyes of the girl who was thrown over the bridge. He states, "In that light the color of her eyes surprised me. Light shrunk the pupils small. The irises were not as dark as I had imagined. They were a strange yellow-brown, a curious shade, just a little darker than amber, and there were small green flecks near the pupils." Later on page 64, McGee states again, "I looked at the eye...Darker than amber."

McGee's occasional sidekick, Meyer, plays a prominent role in the book. Early in the book, McGee describes him:

"You can watch the Meyer Magic at work and not know how it's done. He has the size and pelt of the average Adirondack black bear. He can walk a beach, go into any bar, cross any playground, and acquire people the way blue serge picks up lint, and the new friends believe they have known him forever. Perhaps it is because he actually listens, and actually cares, and can make you feel as if his day would have been worthless, an absolute nothing, had he not had the miraculous good fortune of meeting you. He asks you the questions you want to be asked, so you can let go with the answers that take the tensions out of your inner gears and springs. It is not an artifice. He could have been one of the great con artists of all time. Or one of the great psychiatrists. Or the founder of a new religion, Meyerism."
