= The Green Ripper =

1979 mystery novel by John D. MacDonald

- First edition hardcover
- Author: John D. MacDonald
- Language: English
- Series: Travis McGee
- Genre: Mystery
- Publisher: Fawcett Publications
- Publication date: 1979
- Publication place: United States
- Media type: Print (paperback)
- Preceded by: The Empty Copper Sea
- Followed by: Free Fall in Crimson

The Green Ripper (1979) is a mystery novel by John D. MacDonald, the 18th of 21 in the Travis McGee series. It won a 1980 U.S. National Book Award in the one-year category mystery.

The plot is centered on revenge against a secretive, terrorist cult that is responsible for killing McGee's lover Gretel. The title is a word play on the name of the Grim Reaper. McGee's friend, Meyer, an economist, features prominently in the novel.
