= Cinnamon Skin (novel) =

1982 novel by John D. MacDonald

- First edition (h/b)
- Author: John D. MacDonald
- Language: English
- Series: Travis McGee
- Genre: Mystery
- Publisher: Harper and Row
- Publication date: 1982
- Publication place: United States
- Media type: Print
- Pages: 275
- ISBN: 0-06-014990-6
- Preceded by: Free Fall in Crimson
- Followed by: The Lonely Silver Rain

Cinnamon Skin (1982) is the twentieth novel in the Travis McGee series by John D. MacDonald. Like a few other books in the series, McGee ends up traveling to Mexico to solve a crime. His friend Meyer's niece is killed by a bomb on the John Maynard Keynes, Meyer's houseboat, with two other people. As Meyer and McGee investigate the explosion, they discover her husband, Evan Lawrence, did not die, and instead had a dark and dangerous past.

In the meantime, McGee's relationship with Anne Renzetti, with whom he fell in love in the previous novel Free Fall in Crimson, unravels as she pursues a business opportunity in Hawaii.

Meyer names his new houseboat after Thorstein Veblen.

The title of the book comes from a passage in Chapter 26. The passage reads as follows:

"You smell like cinnamon and you have the right color. Cinnamon skin."
"My God, McGee, can't you come up with something more original."
"I thought it was."
She laughed. "It's a song, you idiot. Piel Canela: Cinnamon Skin. They sing it all over Mexico. ..."
