= The Turquoise Lament =

1973 novel by John D. MacDonald

- First edition
- Author: John D. MacDonald
- Language: English
- Series: Travis McGee
- Genre: Mystery
- Publisher: Lippincott Williams & Wilkins
- Publication date: Nov 1973
- Publication place: United States
- Media type: Print
- Pages: 287
- ISBN: 0-397-00987-9
- Preceded by: The Scarlet Ruse
- Followed by: The Dreadful Lemon Sky

The Turquoise Lament (1973) is the fifteenth novel in the Travis McGee series by John D. MacDonald. It focuses on McGee's involvement with an old acquaintance, Pidge, who believes her husband Howie Brindle is trying to kill her to acquire her considerable inheritance. It takes place primarily in Hawaii and other Pacific Rim islands, particularly American Samoa.
