= The Lonely Silver Rain =

1985 novel by John D. MacDonald

- First edition (h/b)
- Author: John D. MacDonald
- Language: English
- Series: Travis McGee
- Genre: Mystery
- Publisher: Knopf
- Publication date: 1985
- Publication place: United States
- Media type: Print
- Pages: 231
- ISBN: 0-394-53899-4
- Preceded by: Cinnamon Skin

The Lonely Silver Rain (1985) is the 21st and final novel in the Travis McGee series by John D. MacDonald. The work was published a year prior to the author's death, and was not intentionally the end of the series. It is also notable for the introduction of McGee's daughter Jean, who he unwittingly sired with the now-deceased love interest Puss Killian from the ninth book in the series: Pale Gray for Guilt. At the end of the book McGee has taken all of his cash in hand except for a few hundred dollars and placed it in a trust fund for his newly met teenage daughter, and needs to go back to work as a "salvage consultant." The author's death prevented any further development of this new character and plot line.

== Themes ==
The phrase, "The lonely silver rain" appears in page 222 of the first edition hard cover (there's 232 pages in the book). "The rain was heavier. It bounced high off the asphalt, an eight-inch curtain fringe of lonely silver rain. I could stand there until it ended and nothing would change."

The money recovered from McGee's "salvage consultancy" was from finding the Sundowner boat (which was renamed Lazidays) was $193,500, but then he gave $20,000 to a friend named Mick for assistance in the mission.

== Awards ==
The novel was nominated for the 1986 Anthony award for Best Novel.
