= John D. MacDonald =

American writer (1916–1986)

- MacDonald c. 1970–1983
- Born: John Dann MacDonald; July 24, 1916; Sharon, Pennsylvania, U.S.
- Died: December 28, 1986 (aged 70); Milwaukee, Wisconsin, U.S.
- Education: University of Pennsylvania; Syracuse University; Harvard University
- Occupations: Novelist, short story writer
- Spouse: Dorothy
- Children: 1
- Writing career
- Period: 1945–1986
- Genre: Detective fiction

John Dann MacDonald (July 24, 1916 – December 28, 1986) was an American writer of novels and short stories. A prolific author of crime and suspense novels, many set in his adopted home of Florida, he was one of the most successful American novelists of his time. MacDonald sold an estimated 70 million books.

His best-known works include the popular and critically acclaimed Travis McGee series and his 1957 novel The Executioners, which was filmed twice as Cape Fear, once in 1962 and again in 1991, and adapted in 2026 as a television series.

== Early life ==
MacDonald was born in Sharon, Pennsylvania, where his father, Eugene Macdonald, worked for the Savage Arms Corporation. The family relocated to Utica, New York in 1926, his father becoming treasurer of the Utica office of Savage Arms. In 1934, MacDonald was given a choice by his father: spend another year in school as a post-graduate, or go to Europe for several weeks. He chose Europe and this began an interest in travel and photography.

After graduating from high school, he enrolled at the Wharton School of the University of Pennsylvania, but he quit during his sophomore year. MacDonald worked at menial jobs in New York City, then was admitted to Syracuse University, where he met his future wife, Dorothy Prentiss. They married secretly in Pennsylvania in 1937, and had a public ceremony in Utica later that year. He graduated from Syracuse University the next year. The couple had one son, Maynard.

In 1939, MacDonald received an MBA from Harvard University. MacDonald later used his education in business and economics in crafting his fiction. Several of his novels are either set in the business world or involve shady financial or real estate deals.

In 1940, MacDonald accepted a direct commission as a first lieutenant of the United States Army Ordnance Corps. During World War II, he served in the Office of Strategic Services in the China-Burma-India Theater of Operations; this region featured in many of his earlier short stories and novels. He was discharged in September 1945 as a lieutenant colonel. Dear Dordo: The World War II Letters of Dorothy and John D. MacDonald was published by Peppertree Press in 2022.

In 1951 he moved his family from Utica, New York to Florida, eventually settling in Sarasota.

== Writing career ==
=== Early fiction ===
MacDonald's first published short story, "G-Robot", appeared in the July 1936 Double Action Gang magazine. Following his 1945 discharge from the army, MacDonald spent four months writing short stories, generating some 800,000 words and losing 20 pounds (9.1 kg) while typing 14 hours a day, seven days a week. He received hundreds of rejection slips, but "Cash on the Coffin!" appeared in the May 1946 pulp magazine Detective Tales. He would eventually sell nearly 500 short stories to various mystery and adventure fiction magazines. Selections from MacDonald's early magazine fiction, somewhat revised, were later republished in two collections, The Good Old Stuff (1982) and More Good Old Stuff (1984),

Starting with The Brass Cupcake in 1950, MacDonald wrote more than forty standalone crime thrillers and domestic dramas, most published as paperback originals and many of them set in Florida. Among them was The Executioners (1957), which was filmed twice as Cape Fear and later republished under that title. MacDonald also wrote three science fiction novels, including The Girl, the Gold Watch & Everything (1962), which was filmed for television. After introducing his series character Travis McGee in 1964, MacDonald concentrated mostly on that series, although he did publish four additional standalone novels.

=== Travis McGee ===
In 1964, MacDonald published The Deep Blue Good-by, the first of 21 novels starring Travis McGee, a self-described "salvage consultant" who recovers stolen property for a fee of 50 percent, and who narrates his adventures in the first person. McGee originally was to be called Dallas McGee, but MacDonald dropped that name after the Kennedy assassination, borrowing instead the name of Travis Air Force Base. The McGee adventures, each of which has a color in the title, mostly play out in Florida (where McGee lives a hedonistic bachelor life on a houseboat), the Caribbean, or Mexico, and many of them feature his friend and sidekick Dr. Meyer ("Just 'Meyer', please") Meyer, a renowned economist who helps Travis deconstruct elaborate swindles and cases of business corruption.

== Death ==
Following complications of coronary artery bypass surgery, MacDonald slipped into a coma on December 10, 1986. He died at the age of seventy, on December 28, in St. Mary's Hospital in Milwaukee, Wisconsin. He is buried in Poland, New York. He was survived by his wife Dorothy (1911–1989) and a son, Maynard.

== Media adaptations ==
- MacDonald's novel Soft Touch was the basis for the 1961 film Man-Trap.
- His 1957 novel The Executioners was filmed in 1962 as Cape Fear featuring Gregory Peck and Robert Mitchum. Martin Scorsese directed the 1991 remake of Cape Fear starring Robert De Niro and Nick Nolte. Because of the success of the films, The Executioners has been republished under the Cape Fear title, even though the novel is set in Florida and does not mention Cape Fear, North Carolina. A new adaptation as a TV series for Apple TV was released in 2026, starring Javier Bardem, Amy Adams and Patrick Wilson.
- His 1963 novel The Drowner was adapted as an episode of the television series Kraft Suspense Theatre entitled "The Deep End", which aired in January 1964.
- The novel Cry Hard, Cry Fast was adapted as a two-part episode of the television series Run for Your Life during November 1967.
- A 1970 film adaptation of the novel Darker Than Amber was directed by Robert Clouse from a screenplay by MacDonald and Ed Waters. It featured Rod Taylor as series character Travis McGee with Theodore Bikel as his sidekick Meyer. The film earned positive reviews but lost money, causing producer Jack Reeves to abandon his plans to continue the series.
- The novella Linda was filmed twice for television, in 1973 (with Stella Stevens in the title role) and in 1993 (with Virginia Madsen).
- The Girl, the Gold Watch & Everything was adapted for a 1980 TV film. It resulted in a 1981 sequel, The Girl, the Gold Watch & Dynamite.
- The 1980 TV film Condominium, based on MacDonald's novel, featured Dan Haggerty and Barbara Eden.
- Sam Elliott played Travis McGee in the TV adaptation of The Empty Copper Sea, titled Travis McGee (1983). It relocated McGee to California, eliminating the Florida locales basic to the novel.
- The 1984 film A Flash of Green featured Ed Harris. Victor Nuñez, who wrote the screenplay and directed the film, was nominated for Grand Jury Prize at the 1985 Sundance Film Festival.
- A planned film of The Deep Blue Good-by to star Christian Bale as Travis McGee was cancelled by Fox in 2015 after Bale sustained a knee injury. It is not known whether the project will be revived.

== Influence ==
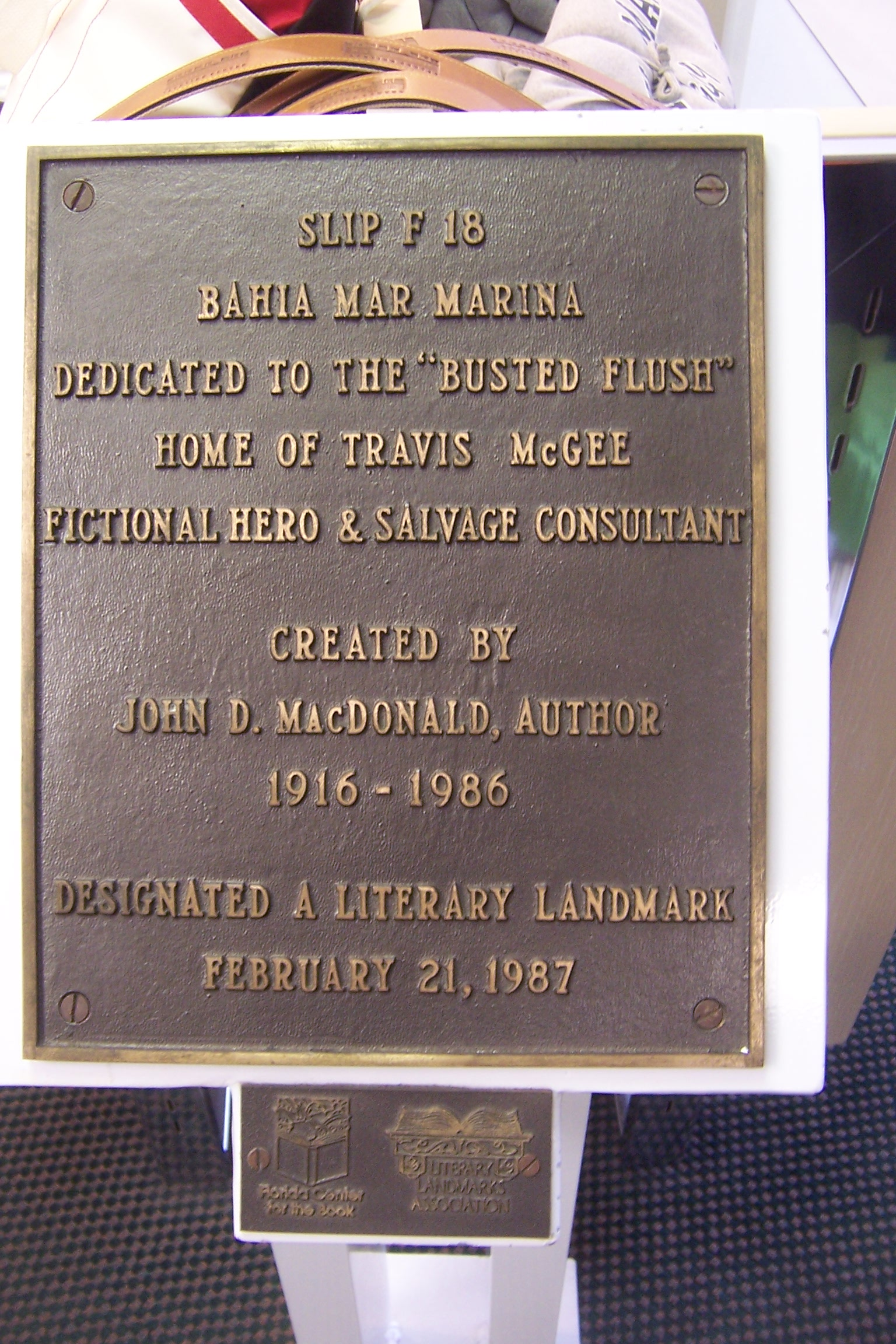
The plaque commemorating creations of MacDonald (Travis McGee, the Busted Flush, and Slip F-18) at Bahia Mar harbor, Lauderdale, as seen in 2011 at the Bahia Mar harbormaster's office and gift shop

Most current Floridian mystery writers acknowledge a debt to MacDonald, including Randy Wayne White, James Hall, Les Standiford, Jonathon King, and Tim Dorsey. In 1972, the Mystery Writers of America bestowed upon MacDonald its highest honor, the Grand Master Award for lifetime achievement and consistent quality. Stephen King praised MacDonald as "the great entertainer of our age, and a mesmerizing storyteller." Kingsley Amis said MacDonald "is by any standards a better writer than Saul Bellow, only MacDonald writes thrillers and Bellow is a human-heart chap, so guess who wears the top-grade laurels."

In a May 2016 The New York Times interview, author Nathaniel Philbrick said: "I recently discovered John D. MacDonald’s Travis McGee series. Every time I finish one of those slender books, I tell myself it’s time to take a break and return to the pile on the night stand but then find myself deep into another McGee novel. Before there were Lee Child and Carl Hiaasen, there was MacDonald — as prescient and verbally precise as anyone writing today can possibly hope to be."

In the novels, McGee had his lodgings on his 52-foot (16 m) houseboat, the Busted Flush, docked at Slip F-18, marina Bahia Mar, Fort Lauderdale, Florida. In 1987, the Friends of Libraries U.S.A. installed a "literary landmark plaque" around what would be Slip F-18 in Bahia Mar. After the docks were remodeled, the plaque was moved to the Dockmaster's office.

Jimmy Buffett wrote and recorded the song "Incommunicado" in 1981 whose 1st verse references both McGee & MacDonald, albeit using Cedar Key to rhyme with McGee instead of Bahia Mar.

== Published works ==
=== Travis McGee series ===
Originally in paperback

- (1964) The Deep Blue Good-by
- (1964) Nightmare in Pink
- (1964) A Purple Place for Dying
- (1964) The Quick Red Fox
- (1965) A Deadly Shade of Gold
- (1965) Bright Orange for the Shroud
- (1966) Darker than Amber
- (1966) One Fearful Yellow Eye
- (1968) Pale Gray for Guilt
- (1968) The Girl in the Plain Brown Wrapper
- (1969) Dress Her in Indigo
- (1970) The Long Lavender Look
- (1971) A Tan and Sandy Silence
- (1973) The Scarlet Ruse

Originally in hardcover

Year	Title	Highest NYT position reached	Number of weeks on NYT list	Notes
1973	The Turquoise Lament	—	—	first McGee to appear initially in hardcover
1975	The Dreadful Lemon Sky	3	23	
1978	The Empty Copper Sea	6	13	a little uncertain due to NYT strike
1979	The Green Ripper	4	14	
1981	Free Fall in Crimson	3	20	
1982	Cinnamon Skin	3	13	
1985	The Lonely Silver Rain	3	12	

Source: The New York Times Best Seller list Figures are for the Adult Hardcover Fiction lists, 1973 through 1985: highest position reached and total number of weeks on list (possibly nonconsecutive). A "—" indicates it did not make the list. Note that the Times list consisted of a Top 10 from 1973 through 1976, but a Top 15 in the covered years after.

Also

- (1984) The Travis McGee Quiz Book (compiled by John Brogan, introduction by MacDonald)

=== Non-series novels (excluding science fiction) ===
- (1950) The Brass Cupcake
- (1951) Murder for the Bride
- (1951) Judge Me Not
- (1951) Weep for Me
- (1952) The Damned
- (1953) Dead Low Tide
- (1953) The Neon Jungle
- (1953) Cancel All Our Vows
- (1954) All These Condemned
- (1954) Area of Suspicion
- (1954) Contrary Pleasure
- (1955) A Bullet for Cinderella (reprinted as On the Make)
- (1956) Cry Hard, Cry Fast
- (1956) April Evil
- (1956) Border Town Girl (reprinted as Five Star Fugitive)/ Linda
- (1956) Murder in the Wind (reprinted as Hurricane)
- (1956) You Live Once (reprinted as You Kill Me)
- (1957) Death Trap
- (1957) The Price of Murder
- (1957) The Empty Trap
- (1957) A Man of Affairs
- (1957) The Executioners (reprinted as Cape Fear)
- (1958) The Deceivers
- (1958) Clemmie
- (1958) Soft Touch
- (1959) Deadly Welcome
- (1959) The Beach Girls
- (1959) Please Write for Details
- (1959) The Crossroads
- (1960) Slam the Big Door
- (1960) The Only Girl in the Game
- (1960) The End of the Night
- (1961) Where is Janice Gantry?
- (1961) One Monday We Killed Them All
- (1962) A Key to the Suite
- (1962) A Flash of Green
- (1963) I Could Go On Singing (screenplay novelization)
- (1963) On the Run
- (1963) The Drowner
- (1966) The Last One Left
- (1977) Condominium
- (1984) One More Sunday
- (1986) Barrier Island

=== Anthologies ===
- (1959) The Lethal Sex (an anthology of mystery stories by women, edited by MacDonald)

=== Short story collections ===
- (1966) End of the Tiger and Other Stories
- (1971) S*E*V*E*N
- (1982) The Good Old Stuff – A collection of select pulp magazine short stories from the beginning of his career, with technology and pop culture references frequently updated to bring the stories into the 1980s
  - "Murder for Money" – Detective Tales, April 1952 as "All That Blood Money Can Buy"
  - "Death Writes the Answer" – New Detective Magazine, May 1950 as "This One Will Kill You"
  - "Miranda" – Fifteen Mystery Stories, October 1950
  - "They Let Me Live" – Doc Savage Magazine, July–August 1947
  - "Breathe No More" – Detective Tales, May 1950 as "Breathe No More, My Lovely"
  - "Some Hidden Grave" – Detective Tales, September 1950 as "The Lady is a Corpse"
  - "A Time for Dying" – New Detective Magazine, September 1948 as "Tune In on Station Homicide"
  - "Noose for a Tigress" – Dime Detective, August 1952
  - "Murder in Mind" – Mystery Book Magazine, Winter 1949
  - "Check Out at Dawn" – Detective Tales, May 1950 as "Night Watch"
  - "She Cannot Die" – Doc Savage Magazine, May–June 1948 as "The Tin Suitcase"
  - "Dead on the Pin" – Mystery Book Magazine, Summer 1950
  - "A Trap for the Careless" – Detective Tales, March 1950
- (1983) Two
- (1984) More Good Old Stuff
  - Deadly Damsel ("Killing All Men!", Black Mask, March 1949)
  - State Police Report That... ("You'll Never Escape", Dime Detective, May 1949)
  - Death for Sale ("My Mission Is Murder", Dime Detective, November 1947)
  - A Corpse in His Dreams (Mystery Book Magazine, Spring 1949)
  - I Accuse Myself ("The Scarred Hand", Doc Savage, November 1946)
  - A Place to Live ("Oh, Give Me a Hearse!", Dime Detective, October 1947)
  - Neighborly Interest ("Killers’ Nest", Detective Tales, February 1949)
  - The Night Is Over ("You've Got to Be Cold", The Shadow, April–May 1947)
  - Secret Stain ("Heritage of Hate", Black Mask, July 1949)
  - Even up the Odds (Detective Story Magazine, January 1948)
  - Verdict ("Three's a Shroud", New Detective, January 1949)
  - The High Gray Walls of Hate ("The High Walls of Hate", Dime Detective, February 1948)
  - Unmarried Widow ("A Corpse-Maker Goes Courting", Dime Detective, July 1949)
  - You Remember Jeanie (Crack Detective, May 1949)
- (1987) The Annex and Other Stories – A very limited edition of 350 printed in Finland containing MacDonald's favorite short stories

=== Science fiction ===
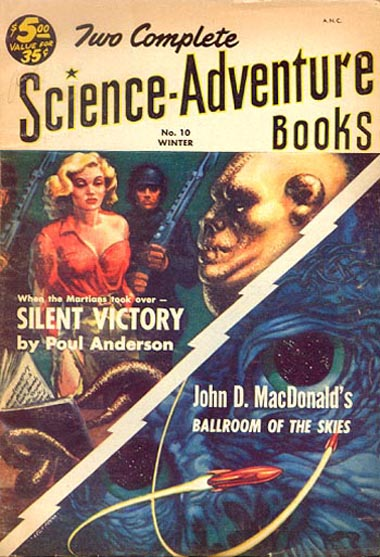
MacDonald's 1952 novel Ballroom of the Skies was reprinted in Two Complete Science-Adventure Books in 1953, but no paperback edition appeared until 1968.

- (1951) Wine of the Dreamers (reprinted as Planet of the Dreamers)
- (1952) Ballroom of the Skies
- (1962) The Girl, the Gold Watch & Everything
- (1978) Other Times, Other Worlds (science fiction stories chosen by MacDonald and Martin H. Greenberg)
- (1980) Time and Tomorrow (an omnibus of MacDonald's three science fiction novels)

=== Non-fiction ===
- (1965) The House Guests
- (1968) No Deadly Drug
- (1981) Nothing Can Go Wrong (with Captain John H. Kilpack) [An account of the last voyage of one of the last American liners (the SS Mariposa (1931)) before it was sold to a foreign company.]
- (1986) A Friendship: The Letters of Dan Rowan and John D. MacDonald 1967-1974
- (1987) Reading for Survival
- (2022) Dear Dordo: The World War II Letters of Dorothy and John D. MacDonald
