= Fawcett Publications =

American publishing company

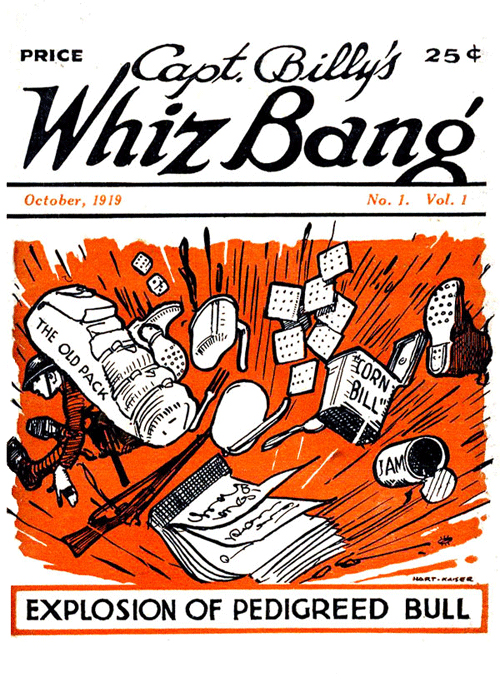
- Debut issue of Captain Billy's Whiz Bang (October 1919)
- Status: Defunct
- Founded: 1919; 107 years ago
- Founder: Wilford Fawcett
- Defunct: 1977; 49 years ago
- Successor: CBS Publications (magazines); Ballantine (books); Charlton Comics (comics)
- Country of origin: United States
- Headquarters location: Robbinsdale, Minnesota (1919–1940); Greenwich, Connecticut (1940–1977)
- Imprints: Gold Medal Books

Fawcett Publications was an American publishing company founded in 1919 in Robbinsdale, Minnesota, by Wilford Hamilton "Captain Billy" Fawcett (1885–1940).

It kicked off with the publication of the bawdy humor magazine Captain Billy's Whiz Bang and expanded into a magazine empire with the first issue of Mechanix Illustrated in the 1920s, followed by numerous titles including True Confessions, Family Circle, Woman's Day, and True. Fawcett Comics, which began operating in 1939, led to the introduction of Captain Marvel. The company became a publisher of paperbacks in 1950 with the opening of Gold Medal Books.

In 1953, the company abandoned its roster of superhero comic characters in the wake of declining sales and a lawsuit for infringement by the Captain Marvel character on the copyright of the Action Comics character Superman, and ended its publication of comic books. It was purchased by CBS Publications in 1977 and subsequently was dismantled and absorbed by other companies.

== Captain Billy's Whiz Bang ==
At the age of 16, Fawcett ran away from home to join the Army, and the Spanish–American War took him to the Philippines. Back in Minnesota, he became a police reporter for the Minneapolis Journal. While a World War I Army captain, Fawcett's experience with the Army publication Stars and Stripes gave him the notion to get into publishing. His bawdy cartoon and joke magazine, Captain Billy's Whiz Bang, became the launchpad for a vast publishing empire embracing magazines, comic books, and paperback books.

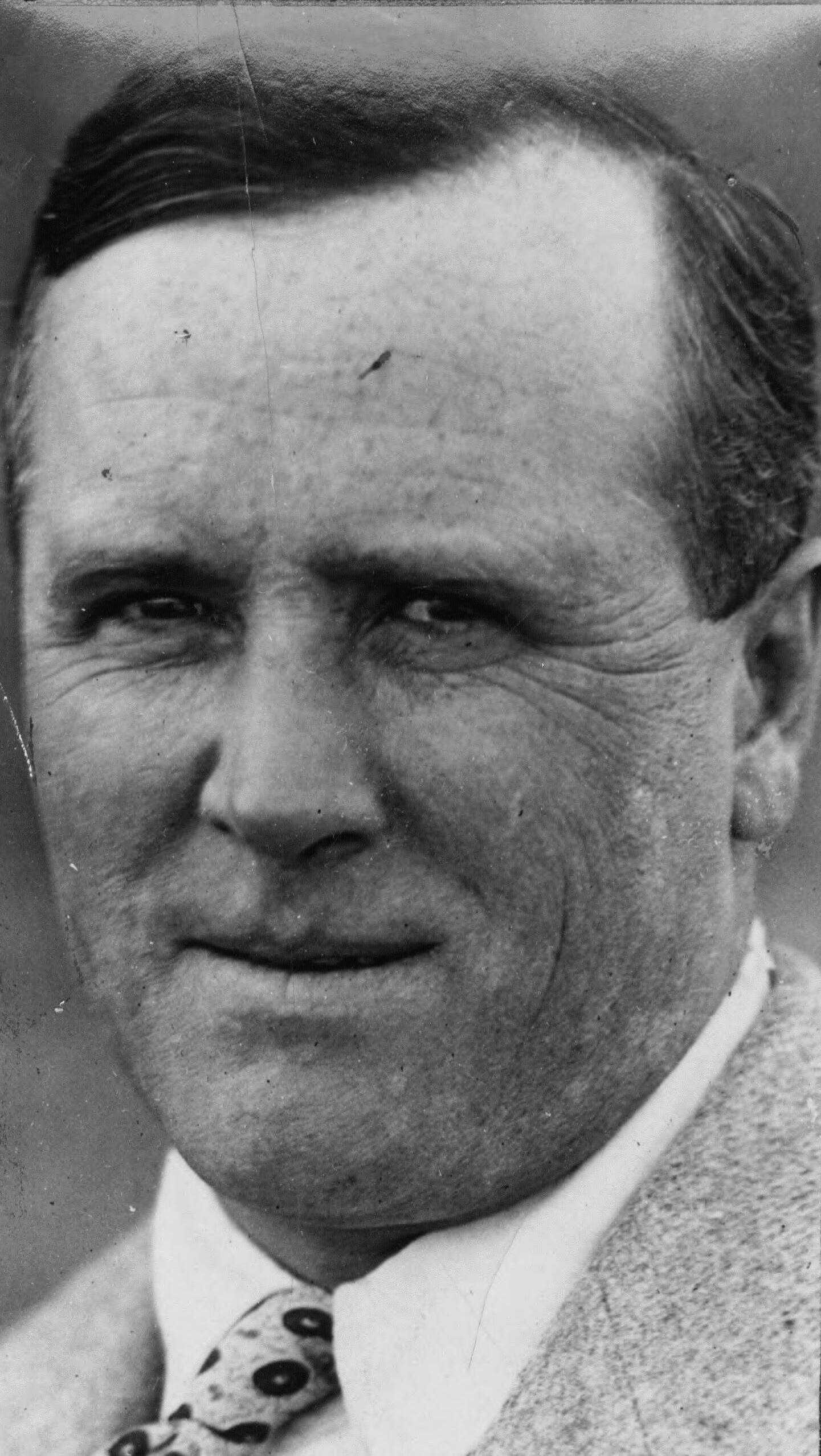
The magazine often featured a picture of Captain Billy in uniform with the comment "This magazine is edited by a Spanish–American and World War veteran and is dedicated to the Fighting Forces of the United States and Canada."

The title Captain Billy's Whiz Bang combined Fawcett's military moniker with the nickname of a destructive World War I artillery shell. According to one account, the earliest issues were mimeographed pamphlets, typed on a borrowed typewriter and peddled around Minneapolis by Captain Billy and his four sons. However, in Captain Billy's version, he stated that when he began publishing in October 1919, he ordered a print run of 5,000 copies because of the discount on a large order compared with rates for only several hundred copies. Distributing free copies of Captain Billy's Whiz Bang to wounded veterans and his Minnesota friends, he then circulated the remaining copies to newsstands in hotels. With gags like, "AWOL means After Women Or Liquor", the joke book caught on, and in 1921, Captain Billy made the highly inflated claim that sales of Whiz Bang were "soaring to the million mark."

The book Humor Magazines and Comic Periodicals notes:

Few periodicals reflect the post-WW I cultural change in American life as well as Captain Billy's Whiz Bang. To some people [it] represented the decline of morality and the flaunting of sexual immodesty; to others it signified an increase in openness. For much of the 1920s, Captain Billy's was the most prominent comic magazine in America with its mix of racy poetry and naughty jokes and puns, aimed at a small-town audience with pretensions of "sophistication".

Captain Billy's Whiz Bang has been immortalized in the lyrics to the song "Ya Got Trouble" from Meredith Willson's 1957 Broadway musical The Music Man: "Is there a nicotine stain on his index finger? A dime novel hidden in the corncrib? Is he starting to memorize jokes from Captain Billy's Whiz Bang?" (Note: An anachronism, since The Music Man takes place in Iowa during 1912, seven years before the premiere issue of Captain Billy's Whiz Bang.)

The publication, delivered in a 64-page, saddle-stitched, digest-sized format, soon saw a dramatic increase in sales. By 1923, the magazine had a circulation of 425,000 with $500,000 annual profits. With the rising readership of Captain Billy's Whiz Bang, Fawcett racked up more sales with Whiz Bang annuals, and in 1926, he launched a similar publication, Smokehouse Monthly. The popularity of Whiz Bang peaked during the 1920s. It continued into the 1930s, but circulation slowed as readers graduated to the more sophisticated humor of Esquire, founded in 1933. It had an influence on many other digest-sized cartoon humor publications, including Charley Jones Laugh Book, which was still being published during the 1950s.

In some issues of Whiz Bang, Captain Billy wrote about his vacations in Los Angeles, Miami, New York and Paris, along with items about his celebrity friends, including Jack Dempsey, Sinclair Lewis, and Ring Lardner.

== March of the magazines ==
During the 1930s, Fawcett and his sons established a line of magazines which eventually reached a combined circulation of ten million a month in newsstand sales. True Confessions alone had a circulation of two million a month. However, during the World War II paper shortages Fawcett folded 49 magazines and kept only 14. Magazines published by Fawcett over the decades included Battle Stories, Cavalier, Daring Detective, Dynamic Detective, Family Circle, Hollywood, Motion Picture, Movie Story, Rudder (later merged with Sea), Screen Secrets, Secrets, Triple-X Western and True. Woman's Day, added to the line-up in 1948, had a circulation of 6,500,000 by 1965.

The flagship of Fawcett magazines was Mechanix Illustrated. It began in the 1920s as Modern Mechanics and Inventions, was retitled Modern Mechanix and Inventions, shortened to Modern Mechanix and then altered to Mechanix Illustrated before it became Home Mechanix in 1984. Acquired by Time Inc., it was retitled yet again to become Today's Homeowner in 1993.

The illustrator Norman Saunders became a Fawcett staffer in 1927 after doing some spot illustrations for Fawcett editor Weston "Westy" Farmer, and Saunders' first cover illustration was for the August 1929 issue of Modern Mechanics and Inventions. He continued to do covers for Fawcett into the 1930s, and when Fawcett opened Manhattan offices in 1934, Saunders and other staffers relocated to New York.

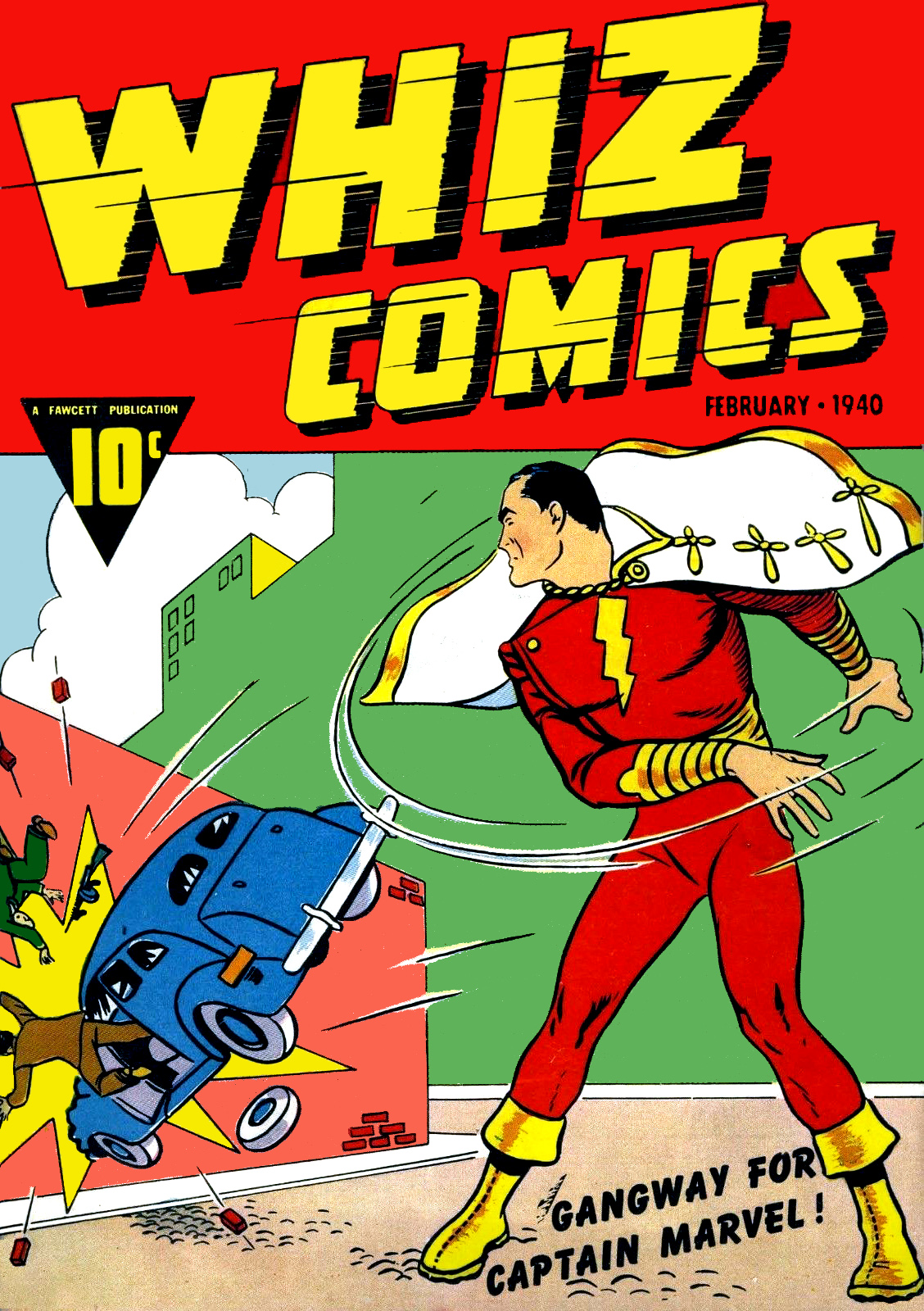
Whiz Comics #2 (February 1940), the first appearance of Captain Marvel. Cover art by C. C. Beck.

Larry Eisinger, the workshop and science editor of Mechanix Illustrated, spearheaded the national "do-it-yourself" movement as the editor-in-chief of Fawcett's How-To book series and special interest magazines. He created Fawcett's Mechanix Illustrated Do-It-Yourself Encyclopedia and The Practical Handyman's Encyclopedia, which had combined sales of almost 20 million copies. In 1959 Electronics Illustrated was created for the hobbyist. It was merged into Mechanix Illustrated at the end of 1972.

After the huge growth during the early 1930s, Fawcett Publications relocated its offices to both New York City and Greenwich, Connecticut in 1940. Corporate headquarters was in Greenwich, and the book publishing division, known as Fawcett World Library, operated out of New York City, at 67 West 44th Street.

== Fawcett Comics ==
Wilford Fawcett's sons continued the expansion of the company after their father's death on February 7, 1940. That same month was the cover date of the first comic book released under the aegis of Fawcett Comics. Fawcett writer William Parker and Fawcett staff artist Charles Clarence Beck devised Captain Marvel, who was introduced in Whiz Comics #2 (released in December 1939 with a February 1940 cover date). The character caught on quickly, moving from Whiz Comics into his own title, Captain Marvel Adventures, early in 1941. Among the artists who worked for Fawcett was Richard Deane Taylor, who began working for the company while still in high school and contributed to Captain Marvel Adventures. The success prompted spin-off characters, beginning with Captain Marvel Jr. in 1941 and Mary Marvel in 1942. Fawcett's line of comics expanded with such colorful characters as Captain Midnight, Bulletman and Bulletgirl, Nyoka the Jungle Girl and Spy Smasher (who became Crime Smasher after World War II). The circulation of Captain Marvel Adventures continued to soar until it outsold Superman during the mid-1940s. Captain Marvel Jr. had such an impact on Elvis Presley that he borrowed the character's poses, hairstyle and lightning flash chest insignia, as described in Elaine Dundy's biography, Elvis and Gladys.

A declining comics market in the 1950s, along with a major lawsuit (National Comics Publications v. Fawcett Publications), resulted in Fawcett folding its line of comic books. Lash Larue, Nyoka, Strange Suspense Stories and other titles were sold to Charlton Comics. In 1972, DC Comics (by then a subsidiary of Warner Brothers as it is today) licensed Captain Marvel, featuring him in new stories. In 1991, DC purchased the entire Marvel Family and related characters outright.

== Gold Medal Books ==
Fawcett was also an independent newsstand distributor, and in 1945, the company negotiated a contract with New American Library to distribute their Mentor and Signet titles. This contract prohibited Fawcett from becoming a competitor by publishing their own paperback reprints. In 1949, Roscoe Fawcett wanted to establish a line of Fawcett paperbacks. In order to get around the contract he decided to publish original books, not reprints. Fawcett announced Gold Medal Books, their line of paperback originals. It was a revolutionary turning point in paperback publishing. Fawcett's editor-in-chief was Ralph Daigh, who had been hired by Captain Billy in 1928, and the art director for Gold Medal was Al Allard, who also had been with Fawcett since 1928.

Beginning their numbering system at 101, Gold Medal got underway with Alan Hynd's We Are the Public Enemies, the anthology Man Story (102) and John Flagg's The Persian Cat (103). Writing about the demise of pulp magazines in The Dime Detectives, Ron Goulart observed, "Fawcett dealt another blow to the pulps when, in 1950, it introduced its Gold Medal line. What Gold Medal specialized in was original novels. Some were merely sleazy, but others were in a tough, hard-boiled style that seemed somehow more knowing and more contemporary than that of the surviving pulps. Early Gold Medal authors included John D. MacDonald, Charles Williams and Richard S. Prather." Others were Benjamin Appel, Bruno Fischer, David Goodis, Day Keene, Dan J. Marlowe, Wade Miller, Jim Thompson, Lionel White and Harry Whittington.

Other 1950 Gold Medal originals included the Western Stretch Dawson by William R. Burnett and three mystery-adventure novels – Nude in Mink by Sax Rohmer, I'll Find You by Richard Himmel. After Donald E. Keyhoe's article "Flying Saucers Are Real" in True (January 1950) created a sold-out sensation, with True going back to press for another print run, Keyhoe expanded the article into a top-selling paperback, The Flying Saucers Are Real, published by Fawcett that same year.

Sales soared, prompting Ralph Daigh to comment, "In the past six months we have produced 9,020,645 books, and people seem to like them very well." However, hardcover publishers resented Roscoe Fawcett's innovation, as evidenced by Doubleday's LeBaron R. Barker, who claimed that paperback originals could "undermine the whole structure of publishing."

In 1950, Bruno Fischer's House of Flesh sold 1,800,212 copies. In 1951, Charles Williams' Hill Girl sold 1,226,890 copies, Gil Brewer's 13 French Street sold 1,200,365 and Cassidy's Girl by David Goodis sold 1,036,497. Authors were attracted to Gold Medal because royalties were based on print runs rather than actual sales, and they received the entire royalty instead of a 50–50 split with a hardback publisher. Gold Medal paid a $2000 advance on an initial print run of 200,000 copies. When a print run increased to 300,000, the advance was $3000.

In 1952, when their contract with NAL expired, Fawcett immediately began doing reprints through several imprints. Red Seal started April 1952 and published 22 titles before it folded a year later. Launched September 1955, Premier Books offered non-fiction titles, such as The Art of Thinking by Ernest Dimnet. Crest Books, which also premiered in September 1955, spanned all genres with an emphasis on Westerns and humor, including Best Cartoons from True and Lester Grady's Best from Captain Billy's Whiz Bang, and one successful Crest title was their movie tie-in edition of Robert Bloch's Psycho. Fawcett Crest was perhaps best known for their many abridged collections issued during the 1960s and 1970s of the Peanuts comic strip titles.

== The Fawcett family ==
Roscoe Kent Fawcett

Captain Billy and Claire Fawcett had four sons and a daughter: Roger (died 1979), Wilford (died 1970), Marion Claire, Gordon Wesley and the youngest, Roscoe. As a boy, Roscoe Kent Fawcett (February 7, 1913 – December 23, 1999) attended Minneapolis schools and was assigned tasks such as dusting furniture and beach cleaning at his father's Breezy Point Resort before he became a vice president and circulation manager for the family publishing company.

Roscoe Fawcett was a veteran of World War II, serving in the anti-aircraft division of the U.S. Army, and later was in charge of entertainment for Camp Haan in Riverside, California. He was married twice, had four sons and died at the age of 86 in Brainerd, Minnesota. One of his sons, Roscoe Fawcett Jr., became the publisher of American Fitness magazine.

Born in Minneapolis in 1912, Gordon Fawcett graduated from the University of Minnesota in 1934. He married Vivian Peterson in 1935 and moved to Los Angeles where he was Fawcett Publications' office manager. He held the title of secretary-treasurer when the company moved to Greenwich, Connecticut in 1940, and he was 81 when he died in West Palm Beach, Florida, on January 16, 1993. Gordon Fawcett had four children.

The Fawcett family was also connected with the rival Calgary Eye Opener, although it was not a Fawcett Publications title. The Eye Opener had been founded in Calgary by Canadian journalist Bob Edwards as a political and satirical newspaper. In 1925, three years after Edwards's death, it was acquired by Harvey Fawcett, a brother of Wilford and Roscoe Fawcett who had broken away from his brothers' publishing business. Harvey moved the publication to Minneapolis and transformed it into a bawdy humour magazine similar to Captain Billy's Whiz Bang and increased its claimed circulation to 200,000.

After Harvey Fawcett's death in 1928, the Calgary Eye Opener was acquired by Henry Myers. In 1932 Myers sold it to Antoinette "Annette" Fisher Fawcett, Wilford Fawcett's former wife, shortly after their divorce. Under Annette Fawcett the Minneapolis-based Eye Opener became a direct competitor of her former husband's Whiz Bang; she hired Wilkie Mahoney, a former Fawcett Publications gag writer, as its editor. Despite being published in Minneapolis, the magazine retained the Calgary Eye Opener name.

== Acquisition and recent history ==
In 1970, Fawcett acquired Popular Library from Perfect Film & Chemical Corporation. Fawcett Publications was bought by CBS Publications in 1977 for $50 million. Ballantine Books (a division of Random House) acquired most of Fawcett Books in 1982 (Popular was sold to Warner Communications) it inherited a mass market paperback list with such authors as William Bernhardt, Amanda Cross, Stephen Frey, P. D. James, William X. Kienzle, Anne Perry, Daniel Silva, Peter Straub and Margaret Truman. Fawcett also became the official home of Ballantine's mass market mystery program. The imprint stopped being used on new books at the beginning of the 21st century. The Fawcett imprint is still a common law trademark using the domain name, FawcettBooks.com, which directs to the Penguin corporate webpage.

In 1987, Fawcett senior executive Peter G. Diamandis and a management team negotiated a $650 million leveraged buy out, then sold six titles to raise $250 million. Diamandis Communications, Inc. was then sold the next year to Hachette Publications for $712 million.

An annual four-day festival held in Robbinsdale, Minnesota, is Whiz Bang Days. Robbinsdale's city celebration, recalling the glory years of Fawcett Publications, began during World War II. The original Fawcett Publications building, which remained standing in Robbinsdale for decades, was torn down during the mid-1990s. It was located at what is now the terrace for the restaurant La Cucina di Nonna Rosa's, at 4168 West Broadway Avenue.

== Sources ==
- Walters, Ray. "Paperback Talk", The New York Times (April 11, 1982).
- Sloane, David E. E., American Humor Magazines and Comic Periodicals (Greenwood Press, 1987)pp. 40–44ff.
