= Cable Bahamas =

Bahamian telecommunications company

Cable Bahamas Ltd.
- Type: Public
- Traded as: BSX: CAB
- Industry: Broadband internet; Cable television; Mobile networking; Television broadcasting
- Founded: 1995
- Headquarters: Nassau, New Providence, the Bahamas
- Revenue: ▼ B$60.7 million (2025)
- Operating income: ▲ B$93 million (2025)
- Total assets: ▲ B$517 million (2026)
- Number of employees: 668 (2020 est.)
- Divisions: Aliv; ALIVFiber; ALIV Business; Rev; Our TV
- Website: cablebahamas.com

Cable Bahamas is a Bahamian telecommunications company, advertised as a "100% Bahamian-owned triple play provider". The company offers broadband, cable and telephone services to over 88,000 homes, and operates a mobile network that covers several Bahama islands. The company owns 48 percent of NewCo15Limited which operates the Aliv mobile networking brand, with the remaining share owned by the Bahamian government. Aliv is one of the country's two licensed mobile operators. Cable Bahamas operates its cable network through the Rev brand, through which they also operate Our News, and the TV channels Our TV and GO242. They also donate to humanitarian causes through the Cable Bahamas Cares Foundation.

Cable Bahamas is a publicly traded company listed on the Bahamas Securities Exchange under the symbol CAB. The company reported a consolidated revenue of B$61 million in the fourth quarter of 2025 and a net loss of B$4 million for the entire year. The company reported total assets of B$517 million and total liabilities of B$498 million.

== History ==
Cable Bahamas was founded in 1995, with over 3000 Bahamians investing B$30 million in a public equity raise. Broadband services were launched in 2000 via a submarine fiber-optic cable system wholly owned by the company.

The company became a triple play provider after acquiring Systems Resource Group in 2010 and introducing REVOICE in 2011. It introduced a video on demand platform named REVTV on Demand in 2012. Cable Bahamas acquired two Florida-based telecommunications companies in 2012. The company was accused by community activist Rodney Moncur of increasing service prices to finance the acquisition.

Prior to 2014 Cable Bahamas charged the Bahamas Telecommunications Company (BTC) more than twice as much for a BTC customer to make a call to a Cable Bahamas number than the other way around. The same year the Bahamas Communications and Public Officers Union (BCPOU) threatened to "shut down" the company over a failure to discuss and conclude a collective agreement tabled more than ten years prior. The company's stock price fell by 55% in September 2015.

The company received its licence from the Utilities Regulation and Competition Authority (URCA) to operate a mobile network in 2016, leading to the launch of the Aliv mobile network in November, organised through a 48.25% ownership of a new company named NewCo15Limited. The move was criticised by an editorial in The Tribune, noting that the company had failed to meet contractual obligations owed to the Bahamian government in delivering cable coverage to every island in the archipelago, mentioning absences in Andros, Bimini, Eleuthera, Cat Island, Long Island, Exuma and Inagua, adding that they would be "piggy-backing" off of number portability roaming and tower sharing through the BTC.

In 2020 the company announced layoffs at Rev and Aliv, citing reduced tourism due to the COVID-19 pandemic as a major factor.

In 2021 they announced they would be investing 80 million USD in a fibre-to-the-home rollout in the Bahamas' most populous island of New Providence.

In 2024 they announced that over 88,000 homes were connected to their ALIVFibr fibre network.
