= George Town, Bahamas =

George Town
- Town
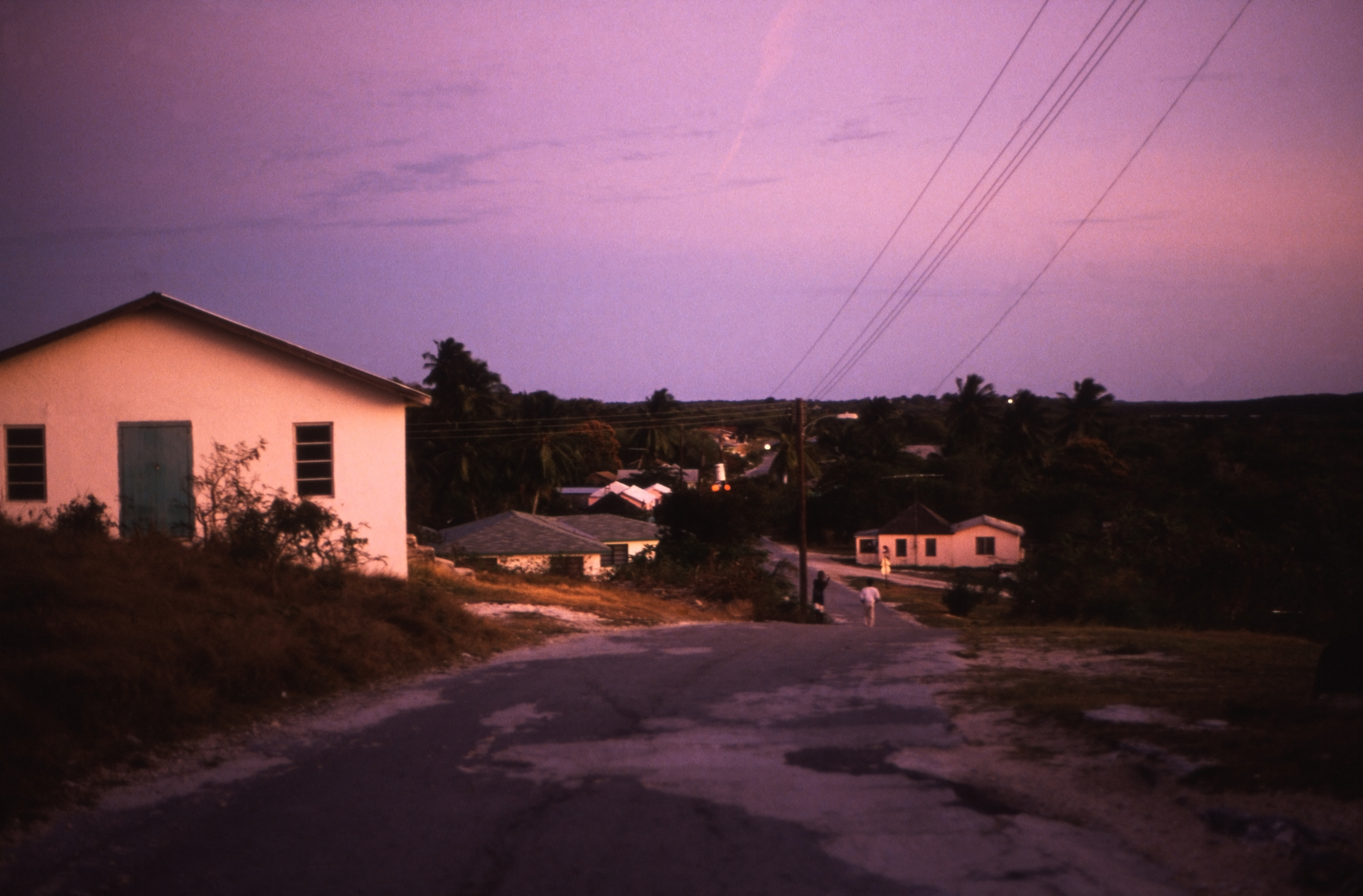
- Georgetown in 1989

- Location within Bahamas
- Coordinates: 23°30′34″N 75°46′46″W
- Country: Bahamas
- Island: Great Exuma
- District: Exuma

Population (2012)
  - Total: 2,488
- Time zone: UTC−05:00 (EST)
  - Summer (DST): UTC−04:00 (EDT)
- Area code: 242

George Town is a town located on the island of Great Exuma in the Exuma district of the Bahamas. It had a population of 2,488 based on 2012 estimates.

The Government Building is a popular tourist attraction inspired by the architecture of the Government House in Nassau. The deep water of Elizabeth Harbour is a popular spot for sea-faring travelers. Pirates used the harbor in the 17th century and plantation owners from Virginia settled the town in the 18th century. During World War II the US Navy used the port.

Services in George Town include shops, restaurants, liquor stores, a gas station, insurance companies, churches, schools, a police station, a hospital and various other small businesses, along with a BTC and Aliv telecommunications office and the "iconic" Peace & Plenty Hotel and a small library. In 2015 the town's historic straw market caught fire and burned down due to an electrical fault and no fire trucks were available to combat the blaze.

Lake Victoria lies in the center of George Town, on the edges of which are a boat rental company, boat ramp, and a dock adjacent to one of the grocery stores in town. Water access to Lake Victoria from Exuma Harbour is under a small bridge in the downtown area.

George Town relies heavily on tourism as a source of income for its businesses and residents, and hosts an annual "Winter Residents' Reception" to welcome seasonal residents and boaters.

George Town hosts the Bahamas' National Family Island Regatta each year, but for the first time in 67 years it was cancelled in 2020 due to COVID-19 concerns. The annual Run for Pompey marathon is also a major tourist attraction held annually starting and ending in George Town but due to COVID-19 was held as a virtual race.
