= Telecommunications in the Bahamas =

Telecommunications in the Bahamas is accomplished through the transmission of information by various types of technologies within the Bahamas, mainly telephones, radio, television, and the Internet. The first telegraph line was laid in 1892 between Jupiter, Florida and current-day Cable Beach in New Providence. The first telephone system was introduced on October 5, 1906 in Nassau. Wireless telegraphy was introduced to Bimini in 1920, and the first telegraph station was opened in West End in 1925. The first telephone service from the Bahamas to the United States was introduced on December 16, 1933.

In 1966 the Telecommunications Department was incorporated as the Bahamas Telecommunication Corporation, also known as Batelco. Batelco was reorganised into the Bahamian Telecommunications Company or BTC in 2002. Cable Bahamas was founded in 1995 after a public equity raise with over 3000 Bahamians contributing. The BDSNi submarine communications cable was built in the mid-2000s, connecting 14 islands of the archipelago, spanning more than 2,800 km.

The use of radio communication and mobile telephony is regulated by the Utilities Regulation and Competition Authority. As of 2026, the only two licensed mobile operators in the Bahamas are Aliv, of which 48% belongs to Cable Bahamas, and BTC. The government of the Bahamas owns 49% of BTC and 51.75% of Aliv.

== Status ==
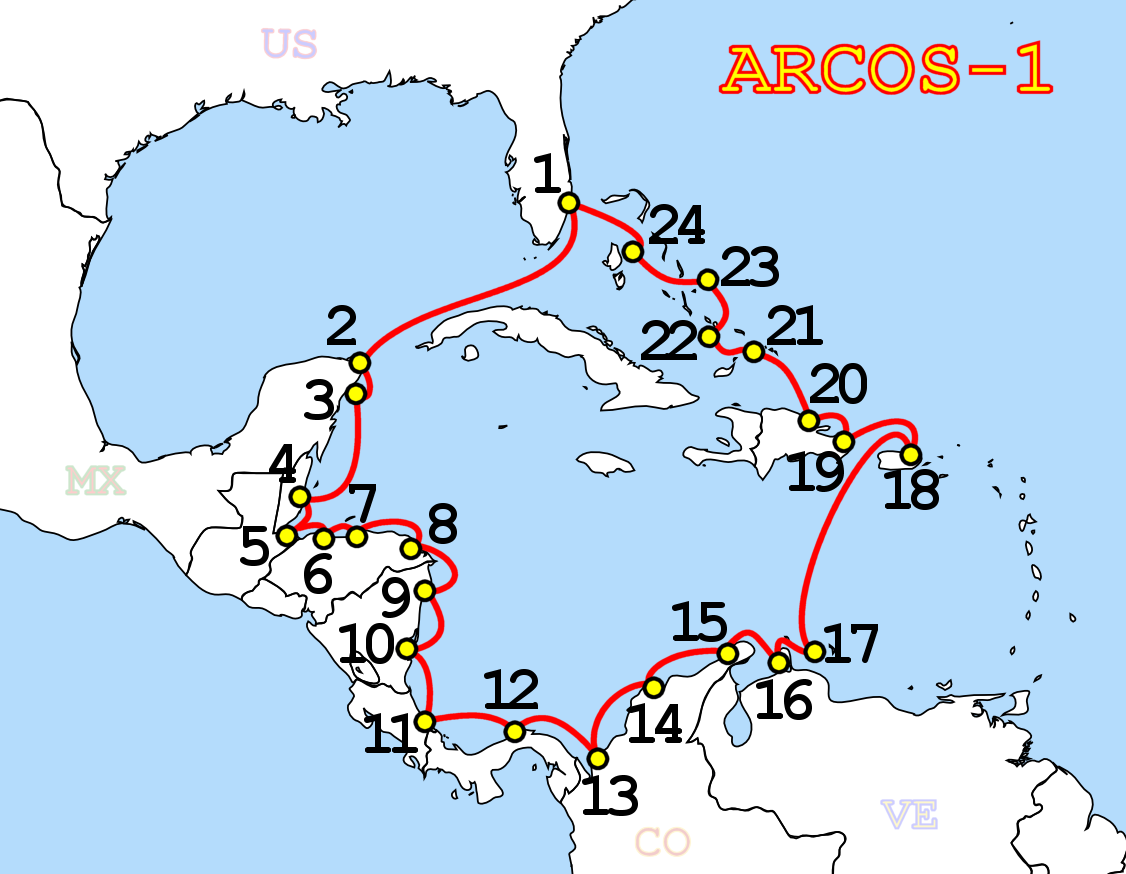
Route of the ARCOS-1 fiber optic submarine communications cable. 22 is Crooked Island, 23 is Cat Island, and 24 is Nassau, Bahamas.

=== Telephones ===
137,000 fixed lines, 141st in the world (2012).

254,000 mobile cellular lines, 176th in the world (2012).

- general assessment: modern facilities;
- domestic: totally automatic system; highly developed;
- domestic submarine cables: the Bahamas Domestic Submarine Network links 14 of the islands;
- international: landing point for the Americas Region Caribbean Ring System (ARCOS-1) fiber-optic submarine cable that provides links to South and Central America, parts of the Caribbean, and the US;
- satellites: two earth stations (2007).

=== Radio ===
About 15 radio stations operating with BCB operating a multi-channel radio broadcasting network alongside privately owned radio stations (2007).

=== Television ===
2 stations (one in Nassau and one in Freeport, a rebroadcast transmitter, commercially run Broadcasting Corporation of the Bahamas (BCB); multi-channel cable TV subscription service is available (2007).

=== Internet ===
226,855 users, 152nd in the world (2012). 71.7% of the population, 47th in the world (2012).

8,730 fixed broadband subscriptions, 52nd in the world (2012). 2.8% of the population, 120th in the world (2012).

20,661 hosts, 117th in the world (2012). 121,856 IPv4 addresses allocated, 385 for every 1,000 people (2012).

Former internet service providers include:

- Coral Wave – an email provider shut down by Rev on June 6, 2022
- BaTelNet – a dial-up and DSL internet service provider operated by the BTC
- SpeedWay Internet – a dial-up internet service provider
- DSL Bahamas – a DSL internet service provider
- BGC – wireless, LAN and WAN services
- Out Island Internet – wireless and dial-up internet service provider
- Wicom Bahamas – fixed wireless service provider

== Internet censorship and surveillance ==
Access to the Internet is unrestricted. There were no government restrictions on access to the Internet or credible reports that the government monitors e-mail or Internet chat rooms without judicial oversight.

The constitution provides for freedom of speech and press, and the government generally respects these rights in practice. An independent press combined with a relatively effective—albeit extremely backlogged—judiciary, and a functioning democratic political system ensures freedom of speech and press. The constitution prohibits arbitrary interference with privacy, family, home, or correspondence, and the government generally respects these prohibitions in practice. Strict and antiquated libel laws dating to British legal codes are seldom invoked.

In April 2013, the Bahamas Commissioner of Police Ellison Greenslade warned that the police would press charges against people who post “lewd” or “obscene” pictures on social media websites and Attorney General Allyson Maynard-Gibson announced that the government was working on legislation that will police information posted on the Internet. "We have to balance freedom of the press with protecting the public,” she added. Also in April Rodney Moncur was charged with "committing a grossly indecent act" by posting autopsy photographs of a man who died in police custody on his Facebook page.

Phone calls to the Bahamas were monitored by the U.S. National Security Agency's MYSTIC program.

== See also ==
- Bahamas
- BTC (Bahamas), Bahamas Telecommunications Company, primary telecommunications provider for the Bahamas, partly government owned.
- List of television stations in the Caribbean
- Television in the Bahamas
- ZNS-1, Radio Bahamas, state-owned
- ZNS-TV 13, state-owned
