= ZGE-FM =

Radio station

- George Town, Bahamas; Bahamas
- Broadcast area: Exuma, Bahamas
- Frequency: 98.3 MHz
- Branding: 98.3 The Breeze FM

Programming
- Format: Tropical music

History
- Call sign meaning: Z (former ITU prefix under United Kingdom rule) George Town, Exuma

Technical information
- ERP: 1,000 watts
- Transmitter coordinates: 23°30′24″N 75°46′11″W

ZGE-FM is a Tropical music station in George Town, Exuma, Bahamas.
