= Big Country (disambiguation) =

Big Country is a Scottish rock band.

Big Country or The Big Country may also refer to:

- The Big Country (Hamilton novel), a 1958 novel by Donald Hamilton
  - The Big Country, a 1958 American western film adaptation of the novel
  - The Big Country (comics), a comic book adaptation of the film
- The Big Country (Timms novel), a 1962 novel by E. V. Timms, completed by his wife Alma Timms
- "Big Country", a song by Bela Fleck and the Flecktones from Left of Cool
- "The Big Country", a song by Talking Heads from More Songs About Buildings and Food
- "The Big Country", the greater metropolitan area of Abilene, Texas and surrounding counties

People nicknamed Big Country:

- Brad Eldred (born 1980), American baseball player
- Roy Nelson (fighter) (born 1976), American mixed martial arts fighter
- Bryant Reeves (born 1973), American retired basketball player
- Kyle Rudolph (born 1989), American football player

== See also ==
- It's a Big Country, a 1951 film
