= Exuma =

District of Exuma
- Coordinates: 25°4′N 77°20′W
- Country: The Bahamas
- Island: Exuma
- Established: 1999

Government
  - Type: District Council
  - Chief Councillor: Godfrey Gray

Area
  - Total: 250 km^{2} (97 sq mi)

Population (2022)
  - Total: 7,293
  - Density: 29/km^{2} (76/sq mi)
- Time zone: UTC−5 (EST)
  - Summer (DST): UTC−4 (EDT)
- Area code: 242

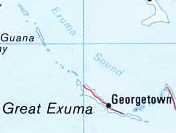
Exuma

Exuma is a district of the Bahamas, consisting of over 365 islands and cays.

The largest of the islands is Great Exuma, which is 37 mi (60 km) in length and connected to another island, Little Exuma, by a small bridge. The capital and largest town in the district is George Town (population 1,437). It was founded 1793 and located on Great Exuma. Near the town, but on Little Exuma, the Tropic of Cancer runs across Pelican Beach lending it another name: Tropic of Cancer Beach. Its white sand and turquoise waters make it a world-famous destination. The entire island chain is 130 mi (209 km) long and 72 sq mi (187 km²) in area. Great Exuma island has an area of 61 sq mi (158 km²) while Little Exuma has an area of 11 sq mi (29 km²).

Between 2000 and 2010, the population of Exuma more than doubled, reflecting the construction of large and small resort properties and the related direct air traffic to Great Exuma from locations as distant as Toronto, Canada. The population in 2010 was 6,928.

== Name ==
The Indigenous Lucayan people called the Exuma Cays Curateo, meaning "outer far distant land".

== History ==
Exuma was settled in or around 1783 by American colonial loyalists fleeing the Revolutionary War. The expatriates brought a cotton plantation economy to the islands. George Town was named in honour of George III, to whom the settlers maintained their loyalty. A few smaller cays still remain partially or wholly privately owned, albeit they are still referred to as part of the Exuma–Bahamas Cays; they are distinguished by a three-digit suffix number. The best known examples are adjoined cays Exuma 642 and 643, which are suffering from receding shorelines.

John Rolle, 1st Baron Rolle, a Loyalist settler of the Exumas, is a major figure in the islands' heritage. Upon his death in 1842, he bestowed all of his significant Exuma land holdings to his slaves. As a result, towns on Great Exuma such as Rolleville and Rolletown were named after him.

The islands are a popular spot for yachting, sailing, diving, and coral reef and cave exploring. Many of the unnamed beaches and coves of the islands, including extensive offshore reef areas, are included in the protected Exuma National Land and Sea Park or the Moriah Harbour Cay National Park of the Bahamas National Trust. Some of the islands on which there are permanent residents and resorts include Great Exuma, Little Exuma, Stocking Island, Staniel Cay (home of the Staniel Cay Yacht Club, a fixture in the Exumas), Fowl Cay, Musha Cay and Iguana Cay. Thunderball Grotto, located just a few hundred yards off Staniel Cay, is one location where the James Bond film Thunderball was filmed. Sandy Cay, just a short boat ride from Little Exuma was the location used for filming the Pirates of the Caribbean beach scenes and a Shell commercial. The novel Wind from the Carolinas was set in Great Exuma.

The Exumas are the historic home of the indigenous Lucayans, who were wholly enslaved in the 16th century, leaving the islands uninhabited until the 18th century. In the intervening period, the Exumas provided many hideouts and stashes for pirates. Elizabeth Harbour was allegedly a favorite lair of Captain Kidd.

In 2017, it was the site of the Fyre Festival, a fraudulent "luxury" music festival which became notorious online and in the media for its shambolic organization, and the numerous lawsuits that followed.

== Transportation ==
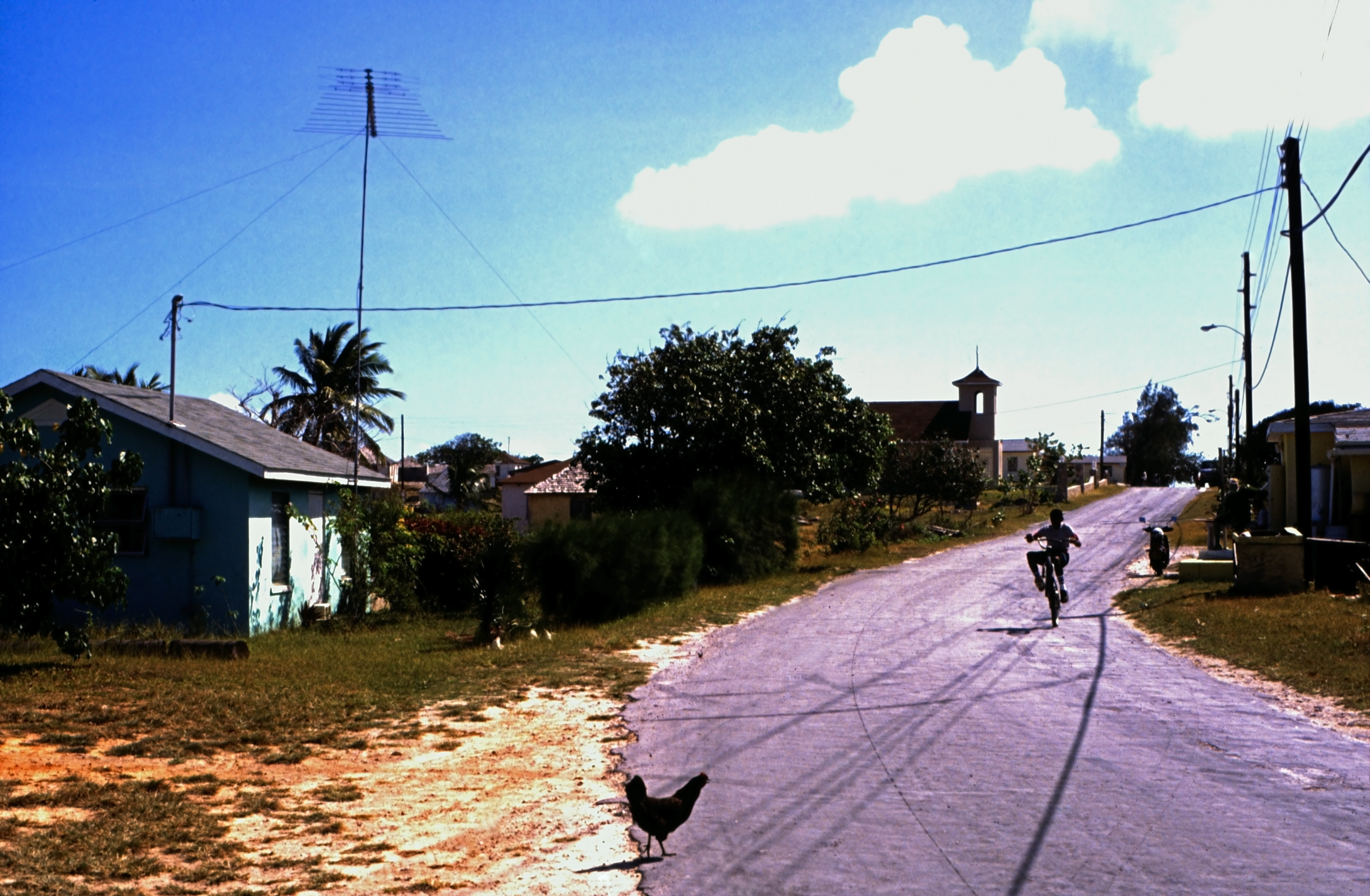
Main street in 1989 in Williamstown, Little Exuma

Exuma International Airport serves the island of Great Exuma including the city of George Town directly from Nassau, Miami, Atlanta, Fort Lauderdale, Charlotte, and Toronto. Staniel Cay and Black Point also have small airstrips commercially served by charter or scheduled charter airlines. A number of other cays have small airstrips, both private and public. Boat travel from Nassau to the Northern Exuma Cays is approximately one hour.

Local transportation may consist of taxis, rental vehicle or golf cart depending on the cay.

== Food ==
Men preparing a meal with caught fish

The Exumas are known for fresh food and cultural significance to The Bahamas. Sea life regularly caught for commercial purpose include barracuda, bonefish, conch, grouper, jack, lobster, marlin, sailfish, snapper, tarpon, tuna and wahoo.

Exumian food is often similar or a slight variation of traditional Bahamian dishes.

The George Town Fish Fry is a collection of businesses, some of which are only open at night serving a variety of cuisine. It is popular among local residents and tourists alike.

== Economy ==
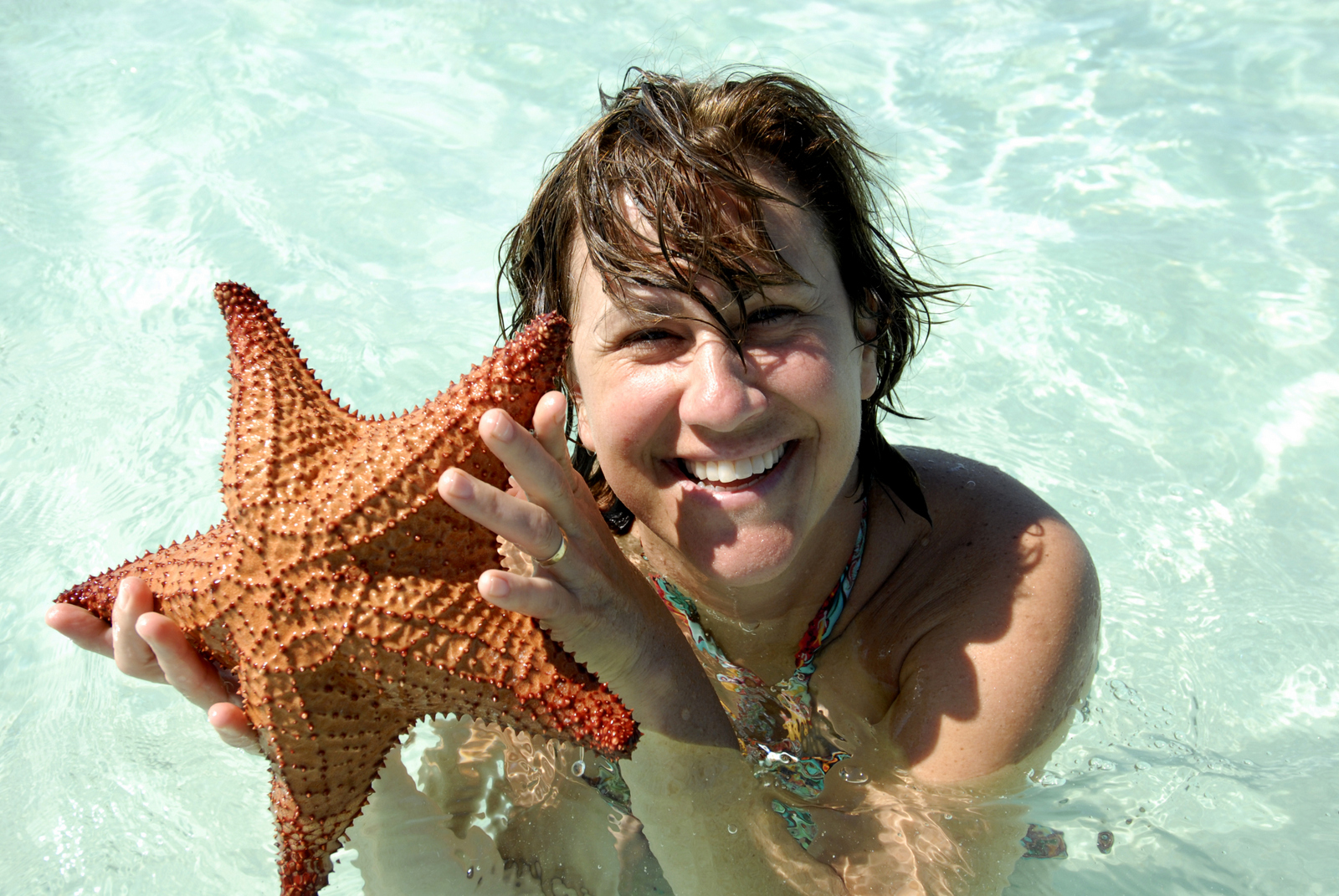
Tourism is a crucial branch of the economy of the area.

The capital, George Town, is home to government offices, shops and services that serve both the traveling public and residents of the islands. As of 2021, there was one bank, a police station, a gas station, a hotel, two grocery stores, and three liquor stores within the town proper. There are also a few other businesses nearby that are typically associated as being in George Town due to proximity.

There are a number of restaurants throughout Exuma, the majority of which serve variations of local cuisine, and some that serve other cuisines such as Italian.

=== Fishing ===
Fishing is a part of both the local and tourism economies of Exuma. Visitors may fish on their own, hire a fishing guide or charter for sport while the local fishing economy primarily supports the local population's food supply. Locals can be often seen fishing from shore and bridges presumably for their own food, often using a hand line.

Known as the "Grey Ghost", bonefish can be found in the flats areas covered by as little as one foot of water, or less. Their light colouration is perfectly adapted as camouflage against the sandy ocean bottom, making the fish difficult to spot in spite of the clear Bahamian waters. Anglers may employ spin casting equipment, but more often opt for fly-fishing in their hunt for bonefish. Other flats fish targets may include permit and tarpon.

Fishing in Exuma is primarily separated into two broad regions, the shallower southern or western side and the deep water of Exuma Sound, although some inshore fishing grounds exist such as in Moriah Harbour National Park. These areas are habitat for other types of fish including various snapper, grunts, jacks, and grouper can be caught throughout the fishing areas in Exuma while pelagic species like wahoo, mahi-mahi, barracuda, marlin, tuna, sailfish and more are primarily caught in Exuma Sound.

=== Tourism ===
The islands have built a reputation as a luxury travel destination.

=== Telecommunication ===
The telephone area code for the island is 242, which is the same as the rest of The Bahamas. There are 2 main telecommunication providers that cover most of the Exuma cays, Aliv and BTC Bahamas.

High-speed internet is available from both providers with varying technologies such as DSL, cellular and fiber optic cable becoming available.

== Culture ==
The annual Bahamian Music and Heritage Festival, Regattas, Junkanoo and various "homecoming" events held in smaller settlements are highly anticipated in The Exumas by tourists and islanders alike. These festivals may focus on the food, sailing competition, arts, and music of the local culture.

== Media ==
Because the population is so tiny, there is a small traditional media industry. The Bahamas is served by many newspapers, radio stations and websites, whereas the local media on Great Exuma consists of The Blaze 98.3 FM. The Chain is a free newspaper published monthly and is the "one source for current and accurate information" on the chain of islands.

=== Books ===
Some books have been written about living in Exuma, including Life on a Rock and This Sweet Place: Island Living and Other Adventures.

== Religion ==
St. John's Baptist Church was built in 1892; St. Theresa's Church was built in 1960; St. Andrews Anglican Parish is the oldest church in Georgetown.

The Baptist church of Farmer's Hill ordained Rev. Stephen Smith in 2015. Rev. Smith 'superseded' Dr. Irvin Clarke Sr., who had been pastor for the previous 45 years. The culvert at Farmer's Hill is being repaired, with sustainable development by an islands construction company.

== Sports ==
Sandals Emerald Bay has an 18-hole golf course designed by professional golfer Greg Norman. Emerald Bay hosts the Great Exuma Classic on the Web.com Tour.

Sailing is a popular sport in Exuma and with many competitions year-round. The Family Island Regatta in George Town is a recurring event at the beginning of every year. Others include the George Town Cruising Regatta and Black Point Regatta.

Rowing is being developed in Exuma with the aim of developing the island as an outlet for competitive and recreational rowing.

== Politics ==
For elections to the House of Assembly of The Bahamas, Exuma is part of "The Exumas and Ragged Island" constituency.

== Notable people ==
The main island has been a haven for celebrities for years. Until recently, the tourist population on the island was extremely minimal, allowing anonymity for anyone escaping the spotlight. Frequent visitors included Princess Margaret, Countess of Snowdon, who stayed at the Goat Cay home of Babbie Holt, Jackie Onassis, Jessica Tandy and Hume Cronyn, and Sigourney Weaver, who vacationed there with her family. More recently, the islands were used by John McAfee, founder of McAfee Software, who conducted his brief 2020 presidential campaign from a boat moored in the harbour.

The Bahamian tax structure may be an advantage for some with the desire to establish residency, while others may purchase homes for private use or investment. Some have purchased private islands, while others have purchased more common homes. A number of well-known people own islands or residences in the Exumas. These include Aga Khan, Nicolas Cage, David Copperfield, Ali Daei, Johnny Depp, Faith Hill and Tim McGraw, Ali Karimi, Eddie Murphy, Eddie Irvine, Tyler Perry and Jena Sims.

Phenton Neymour, a Bahamian politician, was born in Exuma.
