= Goat Cay, Exuma =

Private island in the Bahamas

Coordinates: 23.837°N 76.214°W

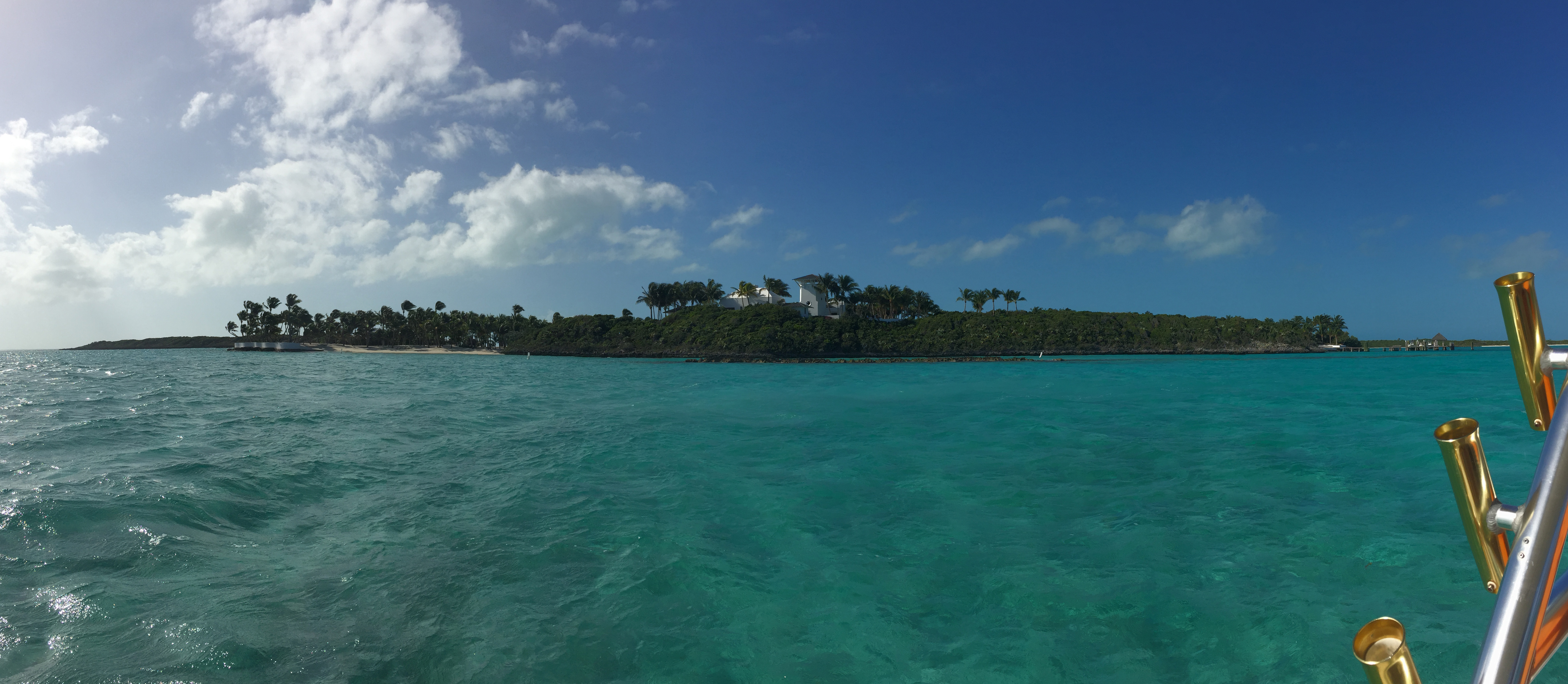
Photograph of Goat Cay, Exuma, The Bahamas taken from boat

Goat Cay is a private island off Darby Island in the Exuma district of the Bahamas. Goat Cay is located somewhat southeast of Musha Cay, an island owned by David Copperfield, and west of Lignum Vitae Cay. (There is also a Goat Cay off Great Exuma Island and off Little Exuma Island, as well as off other Bahama Islands.)

Goat Cay off Darby Island is owned by Tim McGraw who called it "the best place on earth" and wife Faith Hill, who purchased it in 2003. They named the property L’île d’Anges, meaning Isle of Angels. It is listed for sale as of 2021 with an asking price of US$35 million. It has since sold and is no longer owned by the McGraws.

The island's land area is reported to be between 17 and 20 acres with 1 mile of waterfront and 2 beaches. The structures on the island include a 15,000 square foot, 8-bedroom main residence consisting of multiple pavilions connected by thatched-roof loggias. The home includes a lookout tower, and other buildings on the island consist of guest and worker housing for staff that live year-round on the island, yurts and maintenance buildings. The development of the island reportedly took a decade.

The island and its home was featured in the July 2017 issue of Architectural Digest.

The island is completely off grid and self sufficient with generators and a desalination plant. Provisions are shipped in by barge. Access to the island is by boat, seaplane or private airstrip.
