= Alligator II: The Mutation =

- Film poster
- Directed by: Jon Hess
- Written by: Curt Allen
- Based on: Characters by Lewis Teague
- Produced by: Brandon Chase; Cary Glieberman
- Starring: Joseph Bologna; Dee Wallace; Woody Brown; Harlan Arnold; Nicolas Cowan; Brock Peters
- Cinematography: Joseph Mangine
- Edited by: Christopher Ellis; Marshall Harvey
- Music by: Jack K. Tillar
- Production company: Golden Hawk Entertainment
- Distributed by: New Line Cinema
- Release date: June 5, 1991
- Running time: 94 minutes
- Country: United States
- Language: English
- Budget: $3,000,000 (estimated)

Alligator II: The Mutation is a 1991 American monster horror film directed by Jon Hess and starring Joseph Bologna, Woody Brown, Harlan Arnold, Nicolas Cowan, and Brock Peters. It is a sequel to the 1980 film, Alligator.

== Synopsis ==
Deep in the sewers beneath the city of Regent Park, another baby alligator feeds on the experimental animals discarded by Future Chemicals Corporation. Nourished by toxic growth hormones and other mutating chemicals, the gator grows immensely, develops a voracious appetite and goes out on a killing spree. No one believes the sightings until a large number of people are killed, and the police eventually embark on a search-and-destroy mission to put a stop to the alligator's murderous rampage. They track it down to a lake and a police helicopter attempts to blow the alligator up. Two officers enter a marsh area, to where the alligator had escaped. One of the officers uses a rocket launcher and ends the alligator's reign of terror.

== Plot ==
The film's plot has similar elements to the first one. Local tycoon Vincent Brown (Steve Railsback) dumps a tank full of chemicals from Future Chemicals into the sewers. The repeated dumping has mutated a baby alligator to a massive size. Two Mexican fishermen are killed and local Detective David Hodges (Joseph Bologna), notorious for working alone, begins to investigate. While the fishermen's community suspects Brown, a severed leg leads Hodges's wife Chris, a local expert at the university, and the coroner to identify the incident as an alligator attack. Brown has been planning a town party at the lake that Hodges tries to get Mayor Anderson to call off. The Mayor and local police chief refuse.

Hodges reluctantly enlists rookie police officer Rich Harmon, but their attempt to kill the mutant alligator fails. Professional alligator hunter Shai Hawkins and his friends and brother are summoned by Brown. They begin their hunt almost simultaneously with Hodges but fail, having underestimated the size of the creature. After losing his brother and two of his best friends, Hawkins joins Hodges and Harmon's team to hunt the alligator.

Hawkins and his team uncover proof that Brown dumped chemicals into the sewers. Brown has one of his men wreck Chief Speed's car, killing him, then gathers people down to his lake party. Hodges, Harmon, and Hawkins attempt to blow up the alligator with a homemade bomb, but the alligator damages the detonator and eats the bomb. The three pursue the alligator through the sewers after obtaining poison from Chris, while Chris and Harmon's girlfriend Sherri Anderson try to break up the party. Mayor Anderson turns on Brown, who murders him on the Ferris wheel. The alligator reaches the park, ravaging Brown's party and killing Brown and his henchman. Hodges, Harmon, and Hawkins head out on the lake to kill it, but it overturns their boat and devours Hawkins. Hodges stabs the alligator with the poison injector before a helicopter picks up him and Harmon, but the alligator does not die.

Hodges and Harmon, armed with rocket launchers, track the creature to its nest in the sewers. Harmon's shot narrowly misses the alligator. Hodges manages to shoot it in a soft spot on its skull, blowing off the back of its head and detonating the bomb. On returning to the surface, they are greeted as heroes, and Hodges acknowledges Harmon as his partner.

== Cast ==
- Joseph Bologna as Detective David Hodges
- Dee Wallace as Christine Hodges
- Richard Lynch as "Hawk" Hawkins
- Woody Brown as Officer Rich Harmon
- Holly Gagnier as Sheri Anderson
- Bill Daily as Mayor Anderson
- Steve Railsback as Vincent Brown
- Brock Peters as Chief Clarence Speed
- Trevor Eyster (credited as Tim Eyster) as J.J. Hodges
- Vojislav Govedarica (credited as Voyo Goric) as Carmen, Brown's Bodyguard
- Kane Hodder as Billy "Billy Boy" Hawkins
- Carmen Filpi as Henry "Wino Henry"
- Thomas Rosales Jr. as Victor
- Professor Toru Tanaka as Joe "Tokyo Joe", The Wrestler
- Alexi Smirnoff as "The Mad Russian", The Wrestler

== Production ==
The film began shooting in March 1990. setting in Echo Park Lake.

== Release ==
Alligator II: The Mutation was released direct-to-video on December 18, 1991.

== Reception ==
The film, given only a very limited theatrical release, received generally negative reviews, with some critics considering it a retread of the first film. In a review of the original film, Kim Newman of Empire noted that "Alligator II: The Mutation is less a sequel than a lackluster remake". Almar Haflidason of BBC Online wrote that the film lacked "the wit and indeed the scares of the original".
