= The Mall at Marathon =

Shopping mall in Nassau, The Bahamas

- Location: Nassau, The Bahamas
- Coordinates: 25°3′4.05″N 77°19′40.72″W
- Address: Marathon & Robinson Roads, Nassau, New Providence, The Bahamas
- Opened: 1989
- Owner: The Mall at Marathon Limited
- Website: themallatmarathon.bs

The Mall at Marathon is an enclosed shopping mall in Nassau, The Bahamas. Located at Marathon and Robinson Roads, it opened in 1989. In 2017, The Tribune described it as the largest enclosed, air-conditioned shopping centre in the country.

The property is owned by The Mall at Marathon Limited. The mall's website lists a building area of 350,000 sq ft (33,000 m^{2}) on a 38 acres (15 ha) site, approximately 110 businesses and 2,000 parking spaces.

== History ==
The Mall at Marathon opened in 1989.

In late 2011, the Bahamas Telecommunications Company (BTC) opened a store at the mall after a $500,000 renovation. BTC also launched its 4G network around the same time.

The Bahamas Motor Dealers Association's annual auto show has been held at the Mall at Marathon.

A multi-phase renovation program began in 2015. The first phase included changes to roads and parking areas around the property, along with exterior improvements.

Work announced in 2016 included remodeling the main entrance and an adjacent corridor, as well as additional parking. Renovations continued in 2017 with work on another section of the mall and several entrances.

Another phase of the renovation program began in 2018, involving both interior and exterior portions of the property.

The mall reopened on June 2, 2020, after the COVID-19 shutdown. Some tenants said the closure had cut their annual revenue by 30 to 40 percent.

Galleria Cinemas formerly operated a cinema at the mall. The company ceased operations in 2022 after its business had been affected by the COVID-19 pandemic.

The Bahamas' first IHOP opened at the Mall at Marathon on April 4, 2023.

In January 2025, Easy Car Sales said it planned to establish a BYD showroom at the Mall at Marathon. The proposed location would introduce automobile sales to the mall.

In December 2025, Aliv opened a new location at the Mall at Marathon following a $300,000 renovation. The location includes a business centre.
