= Flamingo Road (TV series) =

American television soap opera

- The cast of Flamingo Road
- Genre: Soap opera
- Developed by: Rita Lakin
- Starring: John Beck; Woody Brown; Peter Donat; Howard Duff; Morgan Fairchild; Mark Harmon; Kevin McCarthy; Cristina Raines; Barbara Rush; Stella Stevens
- Theme music composer: Gerald Fried
- Opening theme: "Flamingo Road"
- Country of origin: United States
- Original language: English
- No. of seasons: 2
- No. of episodes: 38

Production
- Executive producers: Michael Filerman; Lee Rich
- Running time: 60 minutes
- Production companies: Michael Filerman Productions; Lorimar Productions

Original release
- Network: NBC
- Release: May 12, 1980 – May 4, 1982

Flamingo Road is an American prime time television soap opera that aired on NBC. It premiered as a television film on May 12, 1980, and as a series on January 6, 1981, after a rebroadcast of the pilot on December 30, 1980. The show was based on a 1942 Robert Wilder novel of the same name and the 1949 movie scripted by Wilder and starring Joan Crawford.

The show was created by Lorimar Productions, who was producing CBS's Dallas and Knots Landing at the same time. Set in the present-day fictional town of Truro, Florida, Flamingo Road centered on the wealthy Weldon family, who made their fortune running the town paper mill.

== Television film (1980) ==
The show's pilot introduces the Weldon family who reside on the ritzy Flamingo Road in Truro, Florida. Claude Weldon (Kevin McCarthy) is the patriarch, who owns the town's paper mill, who is turning the family business over to his son, Skipper (Woody Brown). Eudora (Barbara Rush) is his neglected wife, Constance Weldon (Morgan Fairchild) is his spoiled adopted daughter. Constance is engaged to Deputy Fielding "Field" Carlyle (Mark Harmon), whose every move is dominated by the corrupt Sheriff Titus Semple (Howard Duff), who virtually controls the small town.

Field develops a relationship with Lane Ballou (Cristina Raines), a singer with Coyne's Traveling Circus, who is left behind when the circus is run out of town. Titus is dismayed by this, as he wants Field to someday become a Senator and marry into the Weldon family. After Lane takes a job at the Eagle Cafe, alongside Annabelle Troy (Dianne Kay), Skipper's girlfriend, Titus plots her demise, and at the end of the first hour, Lane is falsely picked up for solicitation. After completing her sentence, Lane defiantly returns to town, taking a job with Lute-Mae Sanders (Stella Stevens), the local bordello owner and Constance's secret mother with Claude, and forming a connection with Sam Curtis (John Beck), a construction magnate. Field and Constance eventually get married with much of the town in attendance, and Eudora finds comfort in Elmo Tyson (Mason Adams), publisher of the town's newspaper. Claude reveals his financial issues to Titus, who agrees to help him in an insurance fraud scheme. The mill is set aflame, with Annabelle (who is revealed to be Titus' daughter and planning on meeting Skipper there) accidentally perishing in the fire.

== Weekly series (1981–1982) ==
=== Synopsis ===
The series picks up where the pilot left off, with Sheriff Titus double-crossing a drug dealing couple, who take revenge by abducting newlyweds Field and Constance, who are honeymooning in the Bahamas. They are eventually saved by Sam Curtis, however the drama continues when they return to Truro. Field, who is campaigning for senator, invites Lane to a trip to Tallahassee, where they continue their affair. Constance gets wind of Field's deception and begins conspiring with Titus to get Lane sent out of town. Meanwhile, Annabelle's mother, Mary Troy (Alice Hirson), comes to town to investigate her daughter's violent death, and the possibility that the Weldon fire was arson. It is revealed that Annabelle was the product of rape, when Sheriff Titus forced himself on Mary.

As the election nears, Field falls off the wagon and turns up drunk at an important political rally. To save his campaign, Constance blabs unconfirmed information about his opponent, and in the end, Field wins the election and is made a Senator of Florida. Their marriage eventually falls apart. Skipper prepares to leave town to accept a job in New Orleans, but decides to stay after Claude is seriously injured in an accident at the mill. He then starts dating Christie Kovacs (Denise Galik), a manipulative girl living with her overbearing sister Alice (Marcia Rodd), a mill employee who is secretly in love with Claude. Christie has an affair with Field, and the two end up in a car accident together, which threatens to ruin Field's political career. Both sisters eventually leave town.

Meanwhile, Lane is tormented by an old acquaintance, for having information about a murder that occurred several years earlier. After an old friend from the circus, Beth McDonald (Sandra Kerns), turns up dead, Lane is kidnapped by the killer Slade (Michael Baseleon). Constance agrees to a divorce with Field, and has a tryst with Sam in revenge. The first season ends with most of the cast trapped in a hurricane and taking refuge at Lute-Mae's, where Lane's kidnappers are arrested. After Field comforts Lane, Constance confronts him, claiming the divorce papers she had drawn were fakes and that she and Field were still married. In a rage, Field and Constance get into an altercation, with Constance falling from the second-story staircase at Lute-Mae's place.

In season two, Constance survives her fall, but is paralyzed indefinitely from the waist down as a result. This becomes a political scandal for Field, but Constance agrees not to press charges if he continues their sham of a marriage. Eudora discovers that Lute-Mae and Claude are Constance's biological parents. Lute-Mae faces her own problems when she is raped by a delivery boy, who is the son of an influential Truro family. Titus refuses to conduct a proper investigation, however Lute-Mae works with Late to get justice.

Field campaigns aggressively to fix a Cuban barrio in town, before discovering Claude is the owner (under Eudora's name). Ruthless tycoon Michael Tyrone (David Selby) comes to town, and gets into a bidding war with Sam for a piece of waterfront property, and with Claude and Eudora for the barrio. Eudora refuses to sell, and develops an addiction to painkillers. Constance eventually regains the use of her legs, but pretends to be paralyzed to keep Field around. The truth eventually comes out when Eudora's addiction worsens, and Eudora is sent to live in a mental sanitarium until she recovers. While she is away, Claude forges her signature to sign the barrio over to Tyrone, who plans on building a casino resort on the property and has Titus evict the Cubans who live there. They include Julio Sanchez (Fernando Allende), who becomes Constance's lover, and his sister Alicia (Gina Gallego), who falls in love with Skipper. When Eudora gets wind of her name being forged, Tyrone loses the barrio, in revenge, he buys the local blank and forecloses on Claude's paper mill, making Field the new owner. Sam and Lane fall in love and get married. Elmo's feud with Titus heats up, with Titus setting off an explosion at the newspaper which leaves Skipper sightless. Alicia stays by him, and they eventually elope and move into the Weldon mansion together.

Field starts dating a reporter, Sandy Swanson (Cynthia Sikes), who is secretly Michael Tyrone's sister. Tyrone's true intentions are revealed, he has come to Truro in revenge after Field's father, Judge Andrew Carlyle, convicted his father for murder and gave him the death penalty. Tyronne firmly believed that his father was innocent, despite the endless evidence that pointed to his guilt, and wanted everyone connected to Judge Carlyle and Titus, who was still sheriff at the time, to suffer. He uses voodoo as his method of destruction, crashing Sam and Field's plane in the Everglades, and then killing his own sister for sleeping with Field by having her car go off a cliff.

After sleeping with nearly everyone else on the cast, Tyrone and Constance start an affair. He then leaves her for Lute-Mae, after finding out she is Constance's mother. Lane and Sam announce that they are expecting a baby. After his season-long campaign to make gambling legal in Florida fails, Tyrone reveals to Constance her true parentage. Soon after, he is shot and presumably killed. In the series finale, several cast members are suspected of the crime before Lute-Mae is arrested as the prime suspect. However, the show ends on a cliffhanger, with Tyrone showing up alive at a reclusive mountaintop monastery.

=== Reception ===
Though the show was initially popular, it soon succumbed to being scheduled against ABC's mystery romance Hart to Hart. NBC pulled the plug on the show in Spring 1982 with its cliffhanger left unresolved, though reruns aired in the timeslot until mid summer of that year. As the 1981–82 season ranked No. 68 out of 105 shows, NBC executives planned a half-hour daytime version of the series to debut in September 1982, but this never came to pass despite the fact a bible for a third season had been drafted by producer Jeff Freilich.

Several of its stars later became better known for other soap opera appearances, with Morgan Fairchild starring on the short-lived soap Paper Dolls before reuniting with David Selby on Falcon Crest and later appearing on ABC's The City. John Beck went onto appear on Dallas, while Howard Duff had recurring roles on both Dallas and Knots Landing. The character of Constance Weldon ranked at #16 on E!'s list of The 50 Most Wicked Women in Primetime.

== Cast and characters ==
=== Main characters ===
Sam Curtis (John Beck, 1980–1982; 38 episodes)
A wealthy playboy construction magnate and owner of Sam Curtis Construction. During the course of the series, he becomes Field's campaign manager, has a brief romance with Constance, before settling down and becoming a devoted husband to Lane. He is loosely based on Dan Reynolds as played by David Brian in the 1949 film.
Skipper Weldon (Woody Brown, 1980–1982; 38 episodes)
The handsome son of Claude and Eudora Weldon. He initially works for his father's business before joining the town newspaper. During the series, he becomes romantically involved with Annabelle Troy (Dianne Kay), before she perishes in the fire at the mill, Christie Kovacs and Alicia Sanchez. He is blinded in an explosion at the paper, orchestrated by Sheriff Titus, and eventually elopes with Alicia.
Sheriff Titus Semple (Howard Duff, 1980–1982; 38 episodes)
The corrupt sheriff of Truro County. During the series, he is responsible for numerous dirty deeds, such as setting Lane Ballou up as a prostitute and getting her arrested, orchestrating the Weldon Mill fire for insurance fraud, getting Field and Constance abducted by drug dealers, and causing an explosion at the newspaper. He is also revealed to be the father of Annabelle Troy, having raped her mother Mary (Alice Hirson). Titus is based on the character played by Sydney Greenstreet in the 1949 film and was originally pitched as the long-lost father of Lane, however this plotline was dropped before the series made it to air.
Constance Weldon Carlyle (Morgan Fairchild, 1980–1982; 38 episodes)
The spoiled adopted daughter of Claude and Eudora Weldon. She marries her high school sweetheart Fielding Carlyle in the pilot, however during the course of series, has sex with nearly every other male character. She is loosely based on Annabelle Weldon as played by Virginia Huston in the 1949 film.
Fielding "Field" Carlyle (Mark Harmon, 1980–1982; 38 episodes)
The town deputy in the pilot, who embarks on a political career and eventually becomes a state senator. He marries Constance, however they later divorce, and during the series, he becomes romantically involved with Lane and Sandy Swanson. Field is based on Fielding Carlisle as played by Zachary Scott in the 1949 film.
Claude Weldon (Kevin McCarthy, 1980–1982; 38 episodes)
The patriarch of the Weldon family and owner of the Weldon Mill. He is a close ally of Titus, who helps him commit insurance fraud to bail out his financial troubles. He secretly fathered Constance with Lute-Mae.
Lane Ballou Curtis (Cristina Raines, 1980–1982; 38 episodes)
A traveling singer who escapes the circus and ends up working at Lute-Mae's bordello. She initially becomes Field's mistress, before settling down and marrying Sam. An older version of the character was played by Joan Crawford in the 1949 film.
Eudora Flowers Weldon (Barbara Rush, 1980–1982; 38 episodes)
Claude's long-suffering wife, who married him out of convenience. She secretly has feelings for Elmo, her childhood love. During the series, she becomes addicted to painkillers and spends time in a mental institution. In the finale, she asks Claude for a divorce.
Lute-Mae Sanders (Stella Stevens, 1980–1982; 38 episodes)
A former madam and owner of the local bordello. She becomes a mother figure for Lane, and is eventually revealed to be Constance's biological mother, after having an affair with Claude. She is based on the character played by Gladys George in the 1949 film.
Elmo Tyson (Mason Adams, 1980; 1 episode; Peter Donat, 1981–1982; 37 episodes)
The editor of the town's newspaper The Clarion. He is secret admirer of Eudora, and later feuds with Titus when he runs for Sheriff. Elmo (originally named Elmo Weldon) was pitched as Claude Weldon's first cousin, however this aspect was scrapped in pre-production.

=== Recurring characters ===
Jasper (Glenn Robards, 1981–1982; 38 episodes)
The trusted butler at the Welden family mansion.
Deputy Tyler (John Shearin, 1981; 7 episodes)
The town deputy who replaces Field as Titus' right-hand man when he runs for Senator.
Phil (Charlie Robinson, 1981; 7 episodes)
The bartender at Lute-Mae's bordello.
Slade (Michael Baseleon, 1981; 6 episodes)
A mysterious man from Lane's past, who is stalking her and murdering her friends from the circus. He is arrested in the finale of the first season.
Christie Kovacs (Denise Galik, 1981; 5 episodes)
Skipper's devious girlfriend with a sordid past, who ends up in bed with Fielding and leaves town after surviving a car accident with him.
Alice Kovacs (Marcia Rodd, 1981; 4 episodes)
Christie's stern older sister who is secretly in love with Claude Weldon. She leaves town not long after her sister does.
Tony (Joel Bailey, 1981–1982; 9 episodes)
Christie's boyfriend, who later is romantically involved with Lute-Mae, becoming the bar's handyman. He ends up stealing from her to cover his gambling losses, and they break up when he tries to blackmail her.
Julio Sanchez (Fernando Allende, 1981–1982; 15 episodes)
The fiery son of Luis (Julio Medina) and Lupe Sanchez (Carmen Zapata), who work for Sam and live in the barrio. He becomes one of Constance's many lovers, which ends when he steals her jewellery.
Alicia Sanchez Weldon (Gina Gallego, 1981–1982; 13 episodes)
Julio's younger sister. She eventually falls in love with and marries Skipper, much to the disapproval of his family.
Michael Tyrone (David Selby, 1981–1982; 18 episodes)
A cunning and debonair businessman who is out for revenge on the town. He later employs Julia (Esther Rolle), a voodoo high priestess to curse the townspeople, eventually killing his own sister.
Sandy Tyrone Swanson (Cynthia Sikes, 1981–1982; 9 episodes)
A reporter who falls for Field. It is eventually revealed that she is Michael's sister, who is involved his revenge plot against Field and Titus. She is killed after driving off a cliff.

== Episodes ==
=== Series overview ===
Season	Episodes	Originally released	
Season	Episodes	First released	Last released
Television film		May 12, 1980	
1	15	January 6, 1981	April 2, 1981
2	22	November 3, 1981	May 4, 1982

=== Television film (1980) ===
Title	Directed by	Written by	Original release date	US viewers (millions)
Flamingo Road	Gus Trikonis	Story by : Robert Wilder; Teleplay by : Rita Lakin	May 12, 1980	16.1
Titus Semple is the sheriff of the small community of Truro in Florida, grooming freshly graduated law student Fielding Carlyle for a career in politics, and manipulating him into marriage to beautiful mill heiress Constance Weldon, the ideal match for an up and coming politician. Only Fielding has met a former exotic dancer, Lane Ballou, and is starting to fall for her charms, causing Semple to take drastic action.

=== Season 1 (1980–81) ===
No. overall	No. in season	Title	Directed by	Written by	Original release date	US viewers (millions)
1 2	1 2	"The Hostages"	Edward H. Feldman	Howard Lakin	January 6, 1981	20.5
Recently graduated from law school, Fielding Carlyle, the new deputy sheriff of Truro County, Florida, takes his new bride, the wealthy Constance Weldon, on a honeymoon yacht cruise with a couple they just met. But as they sail, they are taken hostage aboard the yacht by the couple, who are actually working for a drug dealer who was double-crossed by Fielding's corrupt boss and mentor, Sheriff Titus Semple. The Weldon family receive a ransom demand for half a million dollars, while local businessman Sam Curtis charters a helicopter and flies to the Caribbean to search for the kidnapped couple.
3	3	"Illicit Weekend"	John Newland	Margaret Armen	January 13, 1981	18.1
Field is due to give a senate campaign speech in Tallahassee, and invites Lane to come with him for the weekend. A suspicious Titus is determined to break up the pair, and reveals their plans to a jealous Constance.
4	4	"The Titus Tapes"	Don Weis	Ann Marcus & Ellis Marcus	January 20, 1981	13.1
Titus is determined to drive Lane out of Truro and bugs the rooms above Lute-Mae's bar to uncover damaging information – but Lane finds herself being blackmailed by another source.
5	5	"A Mother's Revenge"	Bob Sweeney	Jeff Freilich & Robert Blees	January 27, 1981	16.8
Annabelle Troy's mother Mary arrives in Truro to discover the truth about her daughter's death in the Weldon mill fire, and has devastating news for Titus. Field acquires some information that could advance his political ambitions.
6	6	"The Fish Fry"	Nicholas Sgarro	Richard Morgan	February 3, 1981	17.4
Feeling the pressure of his political ambitions and his unhappy marriage to Constance, Field disappears just before a scheduled appearance at Truro's fish fry – but later turns up drunk. Can Titus save his protege's political career?
7	7	"The Election"	Bob Sweeney	Frank Furino & John Antony Mulhall	February 10, 1981	14.0
Sam asks newspaper editor Elmo Tyson to endorse Field as prospective senator as the election day looms closer. The Weldons give a lavish election party, and Field spends some time with Lane – much to Constance's fury.
8	8	"The Jealous Wife"	Fernando Lamas	Margaret Armen	February 17, 1981	14.8
Constance demands that Field end his affair with Lane. When he refuses, she teams up with Titus to get rid of Lane.
9	9	"Trapped"	Barry Crane	Kathleen Shelley	March 3, 1981	13.6
Father and son Claude and Skipper Weldon argue over the mill, and an angry Skipper prepares to leave Truro. But when Claude is injured in an accident, Skipper realizes that he cannot run away from his problems.
10	10	"Bad Girl"	Edward H. Feldman	Howard Lakin	March 9, 1981	15.1
Skipper begins a relationship with Christie Kovacs, who hides a dark past. Lane finds the past catching up with her when an old acquaintance dies in suspicious circumstances.
11	11	"Secrets"	Barry Crane	Jeff Freilich	March 10, 1981	16.9
Constance schemes to break up Skipper and Christie, while Lane is pursued by a hitman.
12	12	"They Drive By Night"	Michael Preece	Frank Furino	March 17, 1981	18.2
Christie switches her attentions to Field and tries to seduce him, but they are involved in a car accident. Lane is forced to choose between Field and Sam.
13	13	"Hell Hath No Fury"	Barry Crane	Howard Lakin	March 17, 1981	18.2
Titus warns Christie not to reveal anything about the accident as it could damage Field's political career. Constance and Sam sleep together after they share their frustrations with Field and Lane.
14	14	"Bad Chemistry"	Paul Stanley	Jeff Freilich	April 2, 1981	16.6
A chemical spill from the Weldon mill contaminates Sam's construction site, and Field is asked to intervene to save the town's business community. Field agrees to help Claude and Sam, in exchange for a quick divorce from Constance. Titus bribes Christie to get out of Truro, while the hitman closes in on Lane.
15	15	"Hurricane"	Edward H. Feldman	Margaret Armen	April 2, 1981	16.6
Lane is finally tracked down by her pursuers, but their arrival coincides with Truro being hit by a hurricane. Everybody seeks shelter at Lute-Mae's place. Constance realizes that Lane will always be part of Field's life and argues with him. Their fight on the staircase ends with Constance plunging through the railing...

=== Season 2 (1981–82) ===
No. overall	No. in season	Title	Directed by	Written by	Original release date	US viewers (millions)
16	1	"The Arrangement"	Ron Satlof	Bill D'Avray	November 3, 1981	15.7
Constance fights for life on a hospital operating table, but Field is devastated to learn that even if she recovers from the fall, she may be permanently paralysed. Titus warns Field that he must reconcile with Constance to save his political career, while Eudora Weldon learns the secret identity of Constance's natural mother.
17	2	"The Victim"	Paul Stanley	Jeff Freilich	November 10, 1981	12.3
Constance recuperates at the Weldon mansion, while Lute-Mae is raped by the son of a privileged Truro family. When Titus is reluctant to investigate, Lute-Mae decides to take matters into her own hands.
18	3	"The Substitute"	Edward H. Feldman	Margaret Armen	November 17, 1981	14.1
Field campaigns to improve living conditions in Truro's impoverished Barrio quarter – until he learns the identity of the slum landlord. Sam meets Julio and Alicia Sanchez, the adult children of one of his Cuban employees, who has died at the construction site.
19	4	"The Intruder"	Paul Stanley	Story by : Burt Mulligan; Teleplay by : Joel Steiger, Stephen Black & Henry Stern	November 24, 1981	14.6
Wealthy land developer Michael Tyrone arrives in Truro and immediately clashes with Sam over a bid for choice waterfront property. Skipper is attracted to Alicia Sanchez, and Claude spots Field having lunch with an attractive young woman.
20	5	"The Stranger"	Stan Lathan	Stephen Black & Henry Stern	December 8, 1981	13.2
Claude and Eudora host a welcome party for Michael Tyrone, while Constance enjoys her physiotherapy sessions with a handsome therapist. Lane befriends Charlie Banks, a musician whom Lute-Mae has employed to play at her bar, but her feelings change when she learns his true identity.
21	6	"The Powers That Be"	Kim Friedman	Jeff Freilich	December 15, 1981	14.3
Constance is forced to reveal that she is no longer paralysed, while Tyrone enlists her help in gaining Field's support for his proposed casino resort. Claude considers having Eudora committed to a psychiatric hospital.
22	7	"Little Foxes"	Alan Cooke	Kathleen Shelley	December 22, 1981	11.9
Eudora returns to Truro for Christmas, while Tyrone forces Titus to evict barrio residents and steps up the pressure on Field to approve the casino. Lane tells Lute-Mae about thefts from the bar, and Constance has a steamy assignation with Julio Sanchez.
23	8	"Old Friends"	Larry Elikann	Stephen Black & Henry Stern	January 5, 1982	16.6
Angry over losing the barrio, Tyrone gains control of the local bank and forecloses on the Weldon mill. Claude contemplates suicide when he loses his business. Constance and Julio start an affair, while Sam and Lane consider their relationship when they find themselves stranded together in the country.
24	9	"Strange Bedfellows"	Nick Havinga	Joyce Perry	January 12, 1982	16.0
Titus is challenged by Elmo in the forthcoming sheriff elections, while Field is attracted to Sandie Swanson.
25	10	"Heat Wave"	Stan Lathan	Judy Merl & Paul Eric Myers	January 19, 1982	13.4
Constance persuades Field to hire Julio as an aide. Whilst on a trip to Tallahassee to meet with prospective casino investors, she arranges to meet up for a secret rendezvous with her new lover. Tyrone learns that Lute-Mae is Constance's natural mother; and insinates himself into her life.
26	11	"To Catch a Thief"	Bill Duke	Jeff Freilich	February 2, 1982	16.2
Julio is under suspicion when Constance's jewellery disappears from the Weldon mansion. Tyrone continues to date Lute-Mae and offers her the job of managing his new casino. Sam proposes to Lane.
27	12	"The Explosion"	Stan Lathan	James Fritzhand	February 9, 1982	15.5
Sam and Lane announce their engagement. Titus is furious when Skipper writes a series of editorials for The Clarion, warning against the legalization of gambling in Truro, and warns Elmo to suppress the articles. When Elmo refuses, the Clarion offices are destroyed in an explosion. Skipper survives, but has been blinded.
28	13	"Chance of a Lifetime"	Nick Havinga	Stephen Black & Henry Stern	February 16, 1982	15.1
Skipper learns that the loss of his sight may be permanent. The Truro community gathers together to celebrate Sam and Lane's wedding, but Titus shocks everyone when he arrests one of the guests for blowing up the Clarion offices.
29	14	"Double Trouble"	Bill Duke	Jeff Freilich	February 23, 1982	15.6
A maternal Eudora tries to keep Alicia away from Skipper. Constance has Julio spy on Field, and learns of his relationship with Sandie, as she becomes increasingly involved with Tyrone. Whilst on their honeymoon in Nassau, Sam and Lane meet Tyrone – Lane is frustrated when Sam neglects her to discover more about Tyrone's plans.
30	15	"The Dedication"	Nick Havinga	Kathleen Shelley	March 2, 1982	14.8
Stepping up his plans to take over Truro, Tyrone donates land for use as an arts center, and proposes naming it after Field's father. Alicia gets the better of Eudora, and spends time with Skipper. Sam and Lane move into a mansion on Flamingo Road, and Lane tries to adjust to her new life as one of Truro's wealthiest women.
31	16	"Sins of the Fathers"	Don Weis	James Fritzhand	March 16, 1982	14.9
Field finally gains an advantage over Titus when he uncovers evidence of his late father's dealings with the crooked sheriff, but is unaware that he is being manipulated by Tyrone, who reveals his shocking true agenda for moving to Truro.
32	17	"No Dice"	Michael Preece	Stephen Black & Henry Stern	March 23, 1982	13.8
Field realizes that he has been set up by Tyrone over the vote to legalize gambling in Truro, while Sandie is depressed over her role in the deception, having developed genuine feelings for him. Skipper and Alicia decide to elope.
33	18	"The High and the Mighty"	Don Weis	Jeff Freilich	March 30, 1982	16.7
Sandie warns Field that he and Sam are in danger as they fly to Nassau to gather information about Tyrone's activities. Their plane crashes over the Everglades. Lane learns that she is pregnant, while Tyrone asks Lute-Mae to marry him.
34	19	"The Bad and the Beautiful"	Larry Elikann	Margaret J. Schibi	April 13, 1982	16.0
Tyrone begins to use voodoo in schemes against Truro – Sandie reveals that she is Tyrone's sister and tries to prevent his revenge – only to fall victim herself. Lute-Mae is horrified when she discovers the true extent of Tyrone's malevolent nature when he reveals that he has taken Constance as his lover as well as her, and he has been sleeping with both mother and daughter. Titus and Claude think they have found a way to stop Tyrone.
35	20	"An Eye for an Eye"	Nick Havinga	Stephen Black & Henry Stern	April 20, 1982	15.6
Field resigns his senate seat rather than support the gambling bill, thus ruining Tyrone's plans. Julio declares his love for Constance, who only has eyes for Tyrone, and has initiated divorce proceedings against Field. A deranged Lute-Mae, one step away from a sanitarium, arms herself with a gun and goes after Tyrone.
36	21	"The Harder They Fall"	Larry Elikann	Jeff Freilich & Kathleen Shelley	April 27, 1982	15.1
Titus receives a warning that he will be killed unless Tyrone dies first. Tyrone explains the reason behind all his actions to Eudora. Lane is terrified when a threat is made on Sam's life, and Tyrone heartlessly destroys Constance when he reveals the identity of both her biological parents.
37	22	"Murder, They Said"	Larry Elikann	Jeff Freilich & Kathleen Shelley	May 4, 1982	15.2
With the truth of Constance's parentage now out in the open, Eudora tells Claude that their marriage is over. Lute-Mae escapes from the sanitarium planning to kill Tyrone, just as Constance tries to persuade Julio to kill him also. Titus, Sam and Claude all make separate threats on Tyrone's life. Everyone is under suspicion when a shot is fired at Tyrone's car. But Tyrone is unfazed, telling Titus that his father's spirit will be reborn when Truro is destroyed. A dead body is then discovered during a fire at Tyrone's mansion....

== International broadcasts ==
The show aired in the United Kingdom from 1981 to 1983 on BBC1. It also was rerun in the United States on the Goodlife TV Network from June 2003 to September 2004.

In France, the show was shown on the channel La Cinq, then owned by former Italian Prime Minister Silvio Berlusconi.

The show was aired in Turkey on the state-owned network TRT from 1981 to 1982. Its popularity ended up with many establishments, particularly patisseries, to be named "Flamingo Yolu" (Turkish literal translation) after the series, and even some municipalities throughout Turkey named parks and promenades as that.
