= Sol Madrid =

1968 film by Brian G. Hutton

- Original film poster
- Directed by: Brian G. Hutton
- Screenplay by: David Karp
- Based on: Fruit of the Poppy; 1965 novel by Robert Wilder
- Produced by: Hall Bartlett; Elliott Kastner; Jerry Gershwin (uncredited)
- Starring: David McCallum; Telly Savalas; Ricardo Montalbán
- Cinematography: Fred J. Koenekamp
- Edited by: John McSweeney, Jr.
- Music by: Lalo Schifrin
- Production companies: Hall Bartlett Pictures Inc. Gershwin-Kastner Productions
- Distributed by: MGM
- Release date: February 7, 1968
- Running time: 90 minutes
- Country: United States
- Language: English

Sol Madrid is a 1968 American action film produced by MGM and starring David McCallum, Stella Stevens, Telly Savalas, and Rip Torn. Pat Hingle, Paul Lukas, and Ricardo Montalbán appear in support. It was directed by Brian G. Hutton and filmed in Acapulco. Based on the 1965 novel Fruit of the Poppy by Robert Wilder, it was released in the UK as The Heroin Gang and in Australia as The Secret File of Sol Madrid.

== Plot ==
A half a million dollars is stolen from the American Mafia by its bookkeeper Harry Mitchell, who splits it with capo di tutti capo Dano Villanova's girlfriend Stacey Woodward. Each goes separately into hiding.

Sol Madrid, an undercover US government narc, is assigned to find the pair, hoping to persuade Mitchell to testify against organized crime in court.

Madrid finds Woodward first, and, posing as a high-level drug dealer, takes her to Acapulco. He approaches big time heroin producer Dietrich and proposes going into business together, offering to smuggle Dietrich's drugs into the US for half the profits. Mitchell is Dietrich's house guest.

American law official Jalisco, a Mexican native, is assigned to help Madrid.

When Woodward's whereabouts are discovered by Villanova, Madrid relocate her to his yacht for safety. Villanova tracks her there, has her kidnapped, and in revenge for both her leaving him and ending up with half the stolen money, shoots her up with dope until she becomes an addict.

Dietrich expels Mitchell, who is followed and killed. At Madrid's request, Mexican authorities conduct a major raid on Dietrich's home, who is killed during it by Madrid.

Jalisco proves to be a double crosser, out for himself. Madrid shoots him dead in cold blood.

Madrid pursues Villanova, whom he drowns at the end of a running fight.

Madrid visits Woodward in a recovery facility and apologizes for getting her more involved in Villanova's takedown than he intended. He stoically remains focused on his work.

== Cast ==
- David McCallum as Sol Madrid
- Stella Stevens as Stacey Woodward
- Telly Savalas as Emil Dietrich
- Ricardo Montalbán as Jalisco (credited as Ricardo Montalban)
- Rip Torn as Dano Villanova
- Pat Hingle as Harry Mitchell
- Paul Lukas as Capo Riccione
- Michael Ansara as Capt. Ortega
- Michael Conrad as Scarpi

== Soundtrack ==
Sol Madrid

Soundtrack album by Lalo Schifrin
- Released: 1968
- Recorded: November 9 & 10, 1967; MGM Scoring Stage, Culver City, California
- Genre: Film score
- Length: 28:22
- Labels: MGM; SE 4541 ST
- Producer: Jesse Kaye

Lalo Schifrin chronology
Cool Hand Luke (1967)	Sol Madrid (1968)	The Fox (1968)

The film score was composed by Lalo Schifrin and the soundtrack album was released on the MGM label in 1968. An expanded edition of the soundtrack was released on by Film Score Monthly in 2010 as part of the five CD box set The Cincinnati Kid: Lalo Schifrin Film Scores Vol. 1 (1964-1968).

=== Track listing ===
All compositions by Lalo Schifrin

1. "Sol Madrid (Main Theme)" - 2:00
2. "Fiesta" - 1:35
3. "Stacey's Bolero" - 2:36
4. "The Burning Candle" - 2:25
5. "Adagietto" - 2:50
6. "Sol Madrid (Main Theme)" - 1:55
7. "The Golden Trip" - 2:35
8. "Charanga" - 2:20
9. "El Patio" - 2:25
10. "Villanova's Villa" - 2:10
11. "Bolero #2" - 2:07
12. "Villanova's Chase" - 2:07

=== Personnel ===
- Lalo Schifrin - composer, conductor
- Laurindo Almeida - guitar
- Robert Armbruster - orchestra conductor
- George del Barrio - orchestration
