= Bahamas Securities Exchange =

- Type: Stock exchange
- Location: Nassau, Bahamas
- Founded: 23 September 1999
- Currency: Bahamian dollar
- No. of listings: 52 ( 29 December 2017)
- Market cap: B$5.349 Billion ( 29 December 2017)
- Website: http://bisxbahamas.com/

The Bahamas International Securities Exchange (BISX) is a securities exchange in the Bahamas. It was founded in 1999 and is located in Nassau. The unique four symbol alphanumeric Market Identifier Code (MIC) used to identify the BISX as defined under ISO 10383. of the International Organization for Standardization (ISO) is: XBAA.

== Listed companies ==
Symbol	Issuing company	Sector	Listed on
FBB	Fidelity Bank (Bahamas) Limited	Banking	21 Aug 2000
BBL	Benchmark (Bahamas) Limited	Investment Company	11 May 2000
BPF	Bahamas Property Fund Limited	Property Management	11 May 2000
BWL	Bahamas Waste Limited	Waste Collection	21 Aug 2000
CAB	Cable Bahamas Ltd.	Telecommunications	11 May 2000
CBL	Commonwealth Bank Limited	Banking	11 May 2000
CIB	FirstCaribbean International Bank	Banking	3 Jul 2000
DHS	Doctors Hospital Health System Limited	Healthcare Provider	18 May 2000
FAM	FAMGUARD Corporation Limited	Insurance	11 May 2000
FCL	Freeport Oil Holdings Company Limited	Industrial	11 May 2000
FIN	Finance Corporation of the Bahamas	Banking	3 Jul 2000
CHL	Colina Holdings Limited	Insurance	11 May 2000
ICD	ICD Utilities Limited	Industrial	18 May 2000
JSJ	JS Johnson & Company Limited	Insurance	11 May 2000
FCC	Freeport Concrete Company Limited	Industrial/Retail	14 May 2001
PRE	Premier Commercial Real Estate Investment Company Limited	Property Management	8 Sep 2003
BOB	Bank of The Bahamas Limited	Banking	25 Nov 2004
CWCB	Consolidated Water Co. Ltd.	Industrial	17 Jan 2006
AML	Abaco Markets Ltd.	Consumer Goods	11 May 2000
FCLB	Freeport Oil Holdings Company Limited Class B Preference Shares	Industrial	9 Jun 2008
FBB15	Fidelity Bank (Bahamas) Limited 2015	Banking – Debt	1 Sep 2008
FBB17	Fidelity Bank (Bahamas) Limited 2017	Banking – Debt	1 Sep 2008
FBB22	Fidelity Bank (Bahamas) Limited 2022	Banking – Debt	1 Sep 2008
FBB13	Fidelity Bank (Bahamas) Limited 2013	Banking – Debt	1 Sep 2008
CBB	Commonwealth Brewery Limited	Consumer Goods	24 May 2011

== See also ==
- Economy of the Bahamas
- List of stock exchanges in the Americas
- List of stock exchanges in the Commonwealth of Nations
