= Flamingo Road (film) =

1949 film by Michael Curtiz

- Theatrical release poster
- Directed by: Michael Curtiz
- Screenplay by: Robert Wilder; Edmund H. North (additional dialogue)
- Based on: Flamingo Road; 1946 play by Robert Wilder; Sally Wilder
- Produced by: Jerry Wald
- Starring: Joan Crawford; Zachary Scott; Sydney Greenstreet; David Brian
- Cinematography: Ted D. McCord
- Edited by: Folmar Blangsted
- Music by: Max Steiner
- Production company: Michael Curtiz Productions
- Distributed by: Warner Bros. Pictures
- Release date: April 30, 1949
- Running time: 94 minutes
- Country: United States
- Language: English
- Budget: $1,528,000
- Box office: $2.9 million (rentals)

Flamingo Road is a 1949 American film noir drama directed by Michael Curtiz and starring Joan Crawford, Zachary Scott, Sydney Greenstreet and David Brian. The screenplay by Robert Wilder was based on a 1946 play written by Wilder and his wife, Sally, which was based on Robert Wilder's 1942 novel of the same name.

The plot follows an ex-carnival dancer who marries a local businessman to seek revenge on a corrupt political boss who had her railroaded into prison. Some of the more salacious aspects of the novel were downplayed in the film because of the Hollywood Production Code.

Robert Wilder, who died in 1974, was later credited as the creator of the American TV series Flamingo Road (1980–1982), which drew elements from both the novel and the film.

== Plot ==
Lane Bellamy is a carnival dancer who tires of the life, decides to quit and effectively strands herself in the small town of Boldon City in the Southern United States. She becomes romantically involved with Fielding Carlisle, a deputy sheriff whose career is controlled by Sheriff Titus Semple, a corrupt political boss who runs the town. Semple dislikes Bellamy and mounts a campaign against her. She has difficulty finding work and is arrested on a trumped-up morality charge. Meanwhile, Carlisle is the political machine's choice for state senator. Pushed by Semple to immerse himself in the perfect political family, Carlisle reluctantly marries his long-time girlfriend, Annabelle Weldon.

Sad that the love of her life has essentially abandoned her, Bellamy finds work as a hostess at a roadhouse run by Lute Mae Sanders. There, she meets Dan Reynolds, a businessman who supports the corrupt Semple so long as it is profitable. She charms Reynolds into marrying her and the couple moves to the town's best neighborhood, Flamingo Road.

As a kingmaker in the state, Semple decides to run Carlisle for governor and unseat the incumbent. This is too much even for Reynolds and he is now moved to oppose Semple. When Carlisle, who has a weakness for alcohol, also begins to show his limits in cooperating, Semple flies into a rage and abandons him, destroying Carlisle's career. Then Semple makes himself the candidate. At this, Reynolds grows stronger in his opposition, so Semple arranges to have Reynolds framed.

Later, a drunken Carlisle, who knows what's happening but feels the situation is hopeless, visits the mansion on Flamingo Road and commits suicide practically in front of Bellamy. This gives Semple another weapon in his bid to ruin Bellamy and her husband, who has now been indicted for graft. Bellamy confronts Semple with a gun and demands he phone the attorney general and confess everything, but a physical struggle ensues and she shoots him dead. At the end, Bellamy is in prison awaiting what is intimated to be a favorable ruling and Reynolds indicates he will stick by her.

== Cast ==
- Joan Crawford as Lane Bellamy
- Zachary Scott as Fielding Carlisle
- Sydney Greenstreet as Sheriff Titus Semple
- Gladys George as Lute Mae Sanders
- David Brian as Dan Reynolds
- Virginia Huston as Annabelle Weldon
- Fred Clark as Doc Waterson
- Gertrude Michael as Millie
- Tito Vuolo as Pete Ladas
- Alice White as Gracie
- Sam McDaniel as Boatright

== Release ==
Flamingo Road opened on April 30, 1949, in the United States.

== Reception and box office ==
Howard Barnes wrote in the New York Herald Tribune, "Joan Crawford acquits herself ably in an utterly nonsensical and undefined part...It's no fault of hers she cannot handle the complicated romances and double crosses in which she is involved." Bosley Crowther of The New York Times called it a "jumbled melodrama" in which Crawford robotically experiences a series of crises. Variety described it as "a class vehicle for Joan Crawford, loaded with heartbreak, romance and stinging violence."

The film opened at number three at the US box office, based on grosses from six key cities covered by Variety, including Los Angeles, Chicago, Philadelphia and Washington D.C. In its second week it opened at the Strand Theatre in New York City and moved to number one. According to Warner Bros. records, the film earned theatrical rental of $2,263,000 in the U.S. and Canada and $633,000 in other markets.

== Home media ==
In 1993 the film was released on LaserDisc and on VHS by Warner Home Video in 1998, which also issued it on DVD in 2008 as part of "The Joan Crawford Collection: Volume 2".

It was released as a stand-alone DVD (part of the Warner Archive Collection) in 2017.

Flamingo Road was released for the first time on hi-def Blu-ray on March 14, 2023, by the Warner Archive Collection which includes all of the bonuses from the DVD releases.
