= Cool Hand Luke (soundtrack) =

Soundtrack album by Lalo Schifrin
- Released: 1967
- Genre: Film score
- Length: 31:47; 57:15 (reissue)
- Label: Dot
- Producer: Tom Mack, Donna Schifrin (reissue)

Lalo Schifrin chronology
Music from Mission: Impossible (1967)	Cool Hand Luke (1967)	Sol Madrid (1967)

Alternative Cover
- Cover of the 2001 CD reissue

Cool Hand Luke is a soundtrack album for the Warner Bros. film of the same name, released in 1967 on the Dot label.

== History ==
The original music for Cool Hand Luke was composed by Lalo Schifrin, who reissued it in 2001 along with additional cues and new music on his own Aleph label.

In part because its staccato melody resembles the sound of a telegraph, an edited version of the 6/4 musical cue from "Tar Sequence" has been used for many years as the news music package on several television stations' news programs around the world, most notably on ABC's owned-and-operated stations (except WPVI and KFSN) as part of their local newscasts starting in 1968 and lasting until the mid-1990s. After an increase in licensing fees to the theme and its variants, however, many stations dropped the Tar Sequence and themes based directly on it (such as the Frank Gari-composed news music packages News Series 2000). The Eyewitness News collection by Gari Media, currently used by WABC-TV and many other ABC affiliates, has a similar sound to the Tar Sequence. In Australia, the Nine Network introduced the "Tar Sequence" cue for Nine News in the early-1980s, and is still using variants of the theme as of 2022.

"Plastic Jesus" was sung by Paul Newman, but this version is not included in the soundtrack album. Other songs heard in the film performed by Harry Dean Stanton (but not included on the soundtrack album) include "Midnight Special", "Just a Closer Walk With Thee", "Ain't No Grave Can Keep My Body Down" and "Cotton Fields".

== Reception ==
Professional ratings
Review scores
Source	Rating
Allmusic	3/5 stars
Allmusic	3/5 stars
SoundtrackNet	4.5/5

Thom Jurek stated in his Allmusic review of the reissue: "Of all the film scores Lalo Schifrin has composed — good and bad, and yes, he's done some stinkers — the score to Stuart Rosenberg's 1967 film Cool Hand Luke... is among his greatest achievements. As the reverie of the end title played so simply by Howard Roberts and Tommy Tedesco becomes a poignant memory of the film's hero and his struggle — as well as his laughter — listeners will find themselves wanting more..." Dan Goldwasser wrote: "Lalo's mixture of bluegrass and symphonic music resulted in a unique and satisfying sound. From the distinctive "Main Title" theme to the highly energetic (and Copeland-esque) "Tar Sequence", the first five minutes alone on the album are enough to give one the clear indication that this is no ordinary score."

The Cool Hand Luke score was nominated for an Academy Award.

== Track listing ==
All songs by Lalo Schifrin unless otherwise noted.

1. "Main Title" – 2:08
2. "Just a Closer Walk With Thee" (Traditional) – 2:54
3. "Tar Sequence" – 3:13
4. "Lucille" – 2:45
5. "Egg Eating Contest" – 2:58
6. "Plastic Jesus" (Ed Rush, George Cromarty) – 1:57
7. "Bean Time " – 1:12
8. "Ballad of Cool Hand Luke" – 2:36
9. "Arletta Blues" – 2:54
10. "The First Morning" – 1:51
11. "The Chase" – 3:18
12. "Road Gang" – 1:48
13. "End Title" – 2:13

== 2001 reissue track listing ==
1. "Main Title" – 2:08
2. "Tar Sequence" – 3:13
3. "Just a Closer Walk With Thee" (Traditional) – 2:54
4. "Chase" – 3:17
5. "Lucille" – 2:45
6. "Egg Eating Contest" – 2:57
7. "Eye-Ballin Glasses" – 2:24
8. "Arletta Blues" – 2:54
9. "Criss-crossing the Fence" – 2:19
10. "Plastic Jesus" (Rush, Cromarty) – 1:56
11. "Got My Mind Back" – 3:08
12. "Ballad of Cool Hand Luke" – 2:34
13. "The First Morning" – 1:49
14. "Bean Time " – 1:10
15. "Road Gang" – 1:48
16. "Radio in Barracks" – 1:47
17. "Dog Boy" – 3:09
18. "End Title" – 2:13
19. "Sketches of Cool Hand Luke" – 6:56
20. "Down Here on the Ground" – 5:59

== Personnel ==
- Tom Mack – producer
- Donna Schifrin – producer (reissue)
- Thorne Nogar – engineer
- Andrew Richardson – engineer
- Lalo Schifrin – conductor, liner notes (reissue)
- Theresa Eastman – art direction, design (reissue)
- Bobby Bee – mastering (reissue)
- Stuart Rosenberg – liner notes (reissue)
- Howard Roberts, Tommy Tedesco - guitar
- Earl Palmer - drums
- Tom Malone - Harmonica
- Ray Brown – bass
