= Run for Pompey =

Run for Pompey is an annual race held in Great Exuma, The Bahamas. Named after Pompey, a 32-year-old Bahamian slave in Exuma, who led a movement in 1830 in attempt to stop the transfer of 77 slaves that would have separated families. The movement helped to stop the transfer and is widely recognized in the Bahamas as a substantial moment in Bahamian slaves' fight for freedom.

Proceeds from the event are used for scholarships.

There have been various courses for the race, but primarily it starts and ends in the settlement of George Town. The event currently offers entrants the option of 2k, 5k, 10k, or 21.5k distances, although a 50k ultramarathon has been held in the past. The race often begins early in the morning for runners to have time to complete the race before warmer mid-day temperatures and traffic on the island's only main thoroughfare, Queen's Highway picks up.

2022 turnout for the race, its 8th annual event, reached the highest amount in its history with 300 participants. In 2020, the race was run "virtually" with participants running in their home towns instead of traveling for the race, due to COVID-19.
