= Robert Wilder (novelist) =

American journalist

- Born: January 25, 1901; Richmond, Virginia, U.S.
- Died: August 22, 1974 (aged 73); San Diego, California, U.S.
- Education: Columbia University

Robert Ingersoll Wilder (January 25, 1901 – August 22, 1974) was an American novelist, playwright and screenwriter.

== Biography ==
Wilder was the son of a minister-turned-lawyer-turned-doctor-turned-dentist who was still going to college when his son was born. Wilder's childhood was spent at Daytona Beach, Florida. After a stint with the U.S. Army during World War I, he was educated at Stetson University and Columbia University. At various times in his life, Mr. Wilder was a soda jerk, a ship fitter, a theater usher, a shipping clerk, a newspaper copyboy, boss of a criminal gang, "a publicity agent" (Claudette Colbert was among his clients), a radio executive, and a journalist (for The New York Sun).

Wilder traveled widely and contributed stories to The New Yorker, among other publications. Two of his plays were Sweet Chariot, based on the life and career of African-American activist Marcus Garvey, and Stardust, both produced on Broadway, at a time when Wilder was living in Bayside, New York.

Probably Wilder's best-known book is the novel Flamingo Road (1942). With his wife, Sally, he adapted it into the 1946 play of the same name. He then wrote the screenplay for the 1949 movie version, featuring Joan Crawford. The early 1980s television series Flamingo Road credited Wilder as its creator.

He wrote one of the screenplays for the Western The Big Country (1958), directed by William Wyler. A later novel, Wind from the Carolinas, was first published in 1964.

Wilder died in August 1974. His papers are stored at the Howard Gotlieb Archival Research Center at Boston University.

== Works ==
- God Has A Long Face (1940)
- Flamingo Road (1942)
- Out of the Blue (1943)
- Mr. G. Strings Along (1944)
- Written on the Wind (1946)
- Bright Feather (1948)
- Wait For Tomorrow (1950)
- And Ride A Tiger (1951)
- Autumn Thunder (1952)
- The Wine of Youth (1955)
- Walk With Evil (1957)
- A Handful of Men (1960)
- The Sun Is My Shadow (1960)
- Plough the Sea (1961)
- Wind from the Carolinas (1964)
- Fruit of the Poppy (1965)
- The Sea and the Stars (1967)
- An Affair of Honor (1969)
- The Sound of Drums and Cymbals (1973)

The following movies were based on Wilder's work:

- Flamingo Road (a movie and a TV series)
- Sol Madrid (Fruit of the Poppy)
- A Stranger in My Arms (And Ride a Tiger)
- Written on the Wind
