= Private island =

Island owned by a single private citizen or corporation

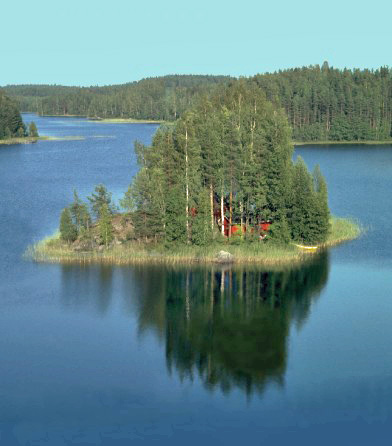
A private island with a summer cottage in Finnish Lakeland, Finland

A private island is a disconnected body of land wholly owned by a private citizen or corporation. Although this exclusivity gives the owner substantial control over the property, private islands remain under the jurisdiction of national and sometimes local governments. Their size can vary widely, from that of a typical suburban yard to several hundred square kilometers.

== Geographic distribution ==
Southeast Asia has numerous islands, with Indonesia being an archipelago of 17,000 islands and the Philippines having 7,641. Real estate laws restrict foreigners' ability to buy property in the geographical area, and many islands either have unclear ownership rights or are already settled. Private islands that are available in Southeast Asia's real estate market are also prohibitively costly due to being in high demand by hotel developers. Developments address these difficulties by selling private islands that have villas and neighbor islands that have high-end hotels; the proximity keeps costs of habitation down.

Europe has hundreds of thousands of islands, many of which are privately owned. With 17,000 islands in Finland, 221,831 islands in Sweden and thousands in Croatia, Europe is increasingly becoming a hotspot for private island holidays. Many islands, although privately owned, are not suitable for development due to legal and governmental restrictions or due to the physical characteristics of the island.

The Falkland Islands in the South Atlantic Ocean feature a number of private islands, typically run as sheep raising family farms and tourist destinations. Prominent among these is Weddell Island, one of the largest private islands in the world, with a surface area of 265.8 km^{2} (102.6 mi^{2}). While the Hawaiian island of Lanai is still bigger at 364 km^{2} (141 mi^{2}), technically it might not qualify as part of its territory (about 2%) does not belong to the principal owner.

Swains Island in the Tokelau archipelago has been owned by the family of Eli Hutchinson Jennings since 1856. In the late 1910s, the U.S. and Britain agreed that the island fell under U.S. jurisdiction, and in 1925 it was administratively joined with American Samoa. In the 1950s, after a labor dispute between the Jennings family and workers on its copra plantation, a form of local government was established for the island, but the Jennings's ownership of the entire island was affirmed.

== Ownership ==
Virtually all islands in the world are claimed and governed by some national government. That nation's laws apply, and any attempt by the owner to claim sovereignty would generally be unrealistic. Nevertheless, some people still try to set up their own micronations on islands, like real-estate millionaire Michael Oliver's attempt at building a libertarian city-state called the Republic of Minerva in the southern Pacific Ocean. There are widely varying government policies regarding private islands: for instance, islands off the coast of China, like any other land within the country, cannot be purchased outright, but only leased from the government for a maximum period of 50 years.

"Private" islands in the United Kingdom, Brazil, Chile and some other countries are not always legally entirely private – in some cases foreshore, such as a beach, is owned by the government, and is hence publicly accessible property, despite what the owners of the land on the island may wish to claim. The same applies to freedom to roam in Nordic countries: only the yard of a house and the immediate vicinity is legally protected against trespassing, and the water bodies around the island are freely navigable.

There are many thousands of uninhabited islands in the world with potential for commercial development of tourist resorts or private recreational use. Some islands can be bought undeveloped, while others already have roads and/or houses. Islands are also available for rent. Many celebrities have their own private islands.

Commercial development of uninhabited islands can raise ecological concerns, as many have a fragile environment.

== Real estate ==
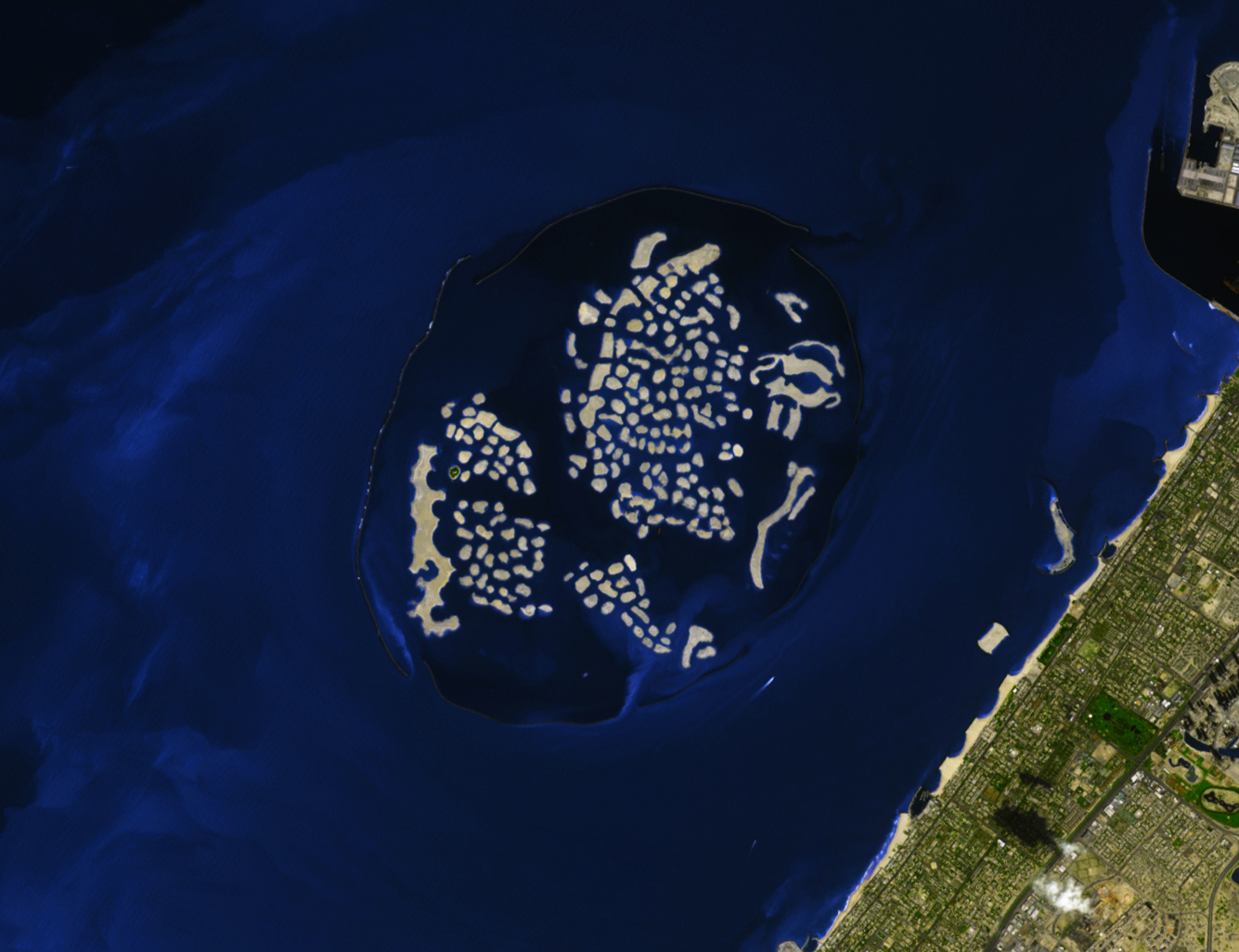
Several Islands on The World archipelago off the coast of Dubai are privately held

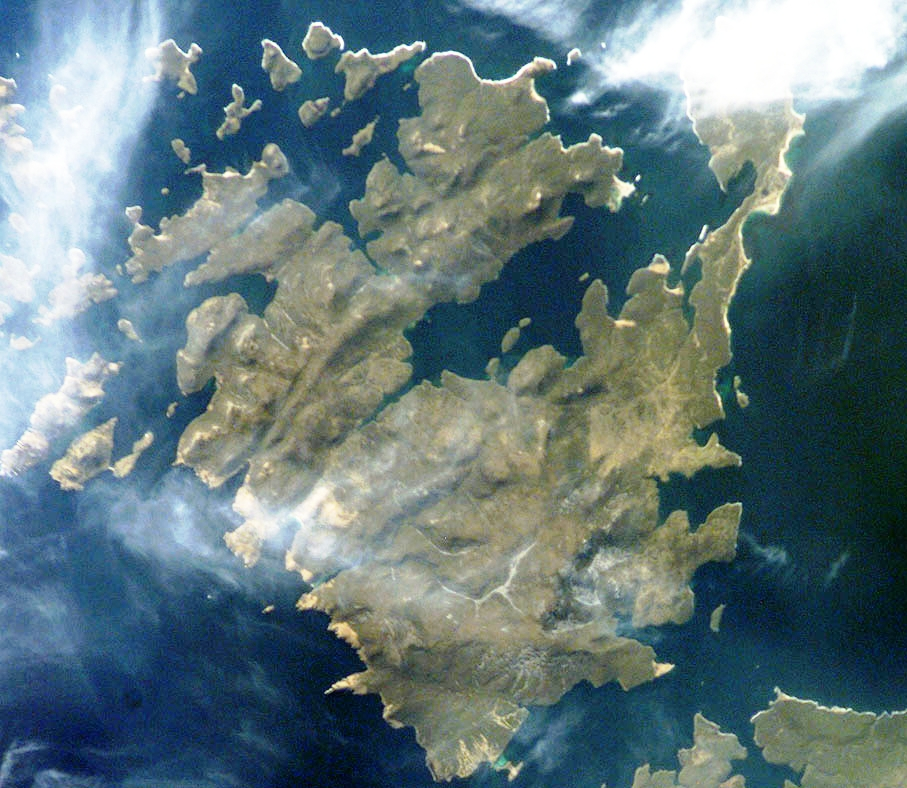
Weddell Island in the Falkland Islands, South Atlantic, is privately owned.

The real estate market for private islands varies globally. Prices tend to be lower in Nova Scotia, parts of Michigan and Maine, and parts of Central America; and higher in Europe, the Bahamas, and Oceanic countries like French Polynesia. Islands with amenities have higher market value and are not sold as frequently. Some are available for travelers to rent, a trend which increased in the 2000s with economic recession making it more difficult for some owners to maintain them.

In the 2000s, the United States housing bubble increased the cost-per-acre for private islands. The effect was fueled by the advent of the Internet, which provided greater access to island inventories. Conservation groups' efforts to restrict development reduced the supply of private islands in the market, raising prices.

=== Cruise lines ===
Since 1992 a number of cruise lines have acquired "private islands" to offer their customers exclusive beach experiences. Such islands (or sections thereof) were further developed to have restaurants and perhaps additional attractions such as parasailing, waterparks, zip lines, horseback riding, spas and more. Some islands have piers, others are reached by tender. The purchase of an island allows the cruise line to achieve greater control over the venue and to influence the quality of experience of their passengers. Certain private islands may be used not only by the cruise line that bought the property but also by associated lines.

=== List of "private islands" of cruise lines ===
==== Royal Caribbean International ====
- Perfect Day at CocoCay (Little Stirrup Cay), Bahamas, pier access
- Labadee, part of Cap-Haïtien, Haiti, pier access
- Royal Beach Club Paradise Island, Nassau, Bahamas, day resort (under construction)
- Royal Beach Club Cozumel, Quintana Roo, Mexico, day resort (planned)
- Perfect Day Mexico, part of Mahahual, Quintana Roo, Mexico, pier access (planned)

==== Carnival Corporation ====
- Half Moon Cay or Little San Salvador Island, Bahamas, Holland America Line
- Princess Cays, part of Eleuthera, Bahamas, Princess Cruises, bought in 1992
- Celebration Key, part of Grand Bahama, Bahamas, Carnival Cruise Line, pier access

==== Disney Cruise Line ====
- Castaway Cay, Bahamas, pier access
- Lookout Cay at Lighthouse Point, part of Eleuthera, Bahamas, pier access

==== Norwegian Cruise Line ====
- Great Stirrup Cay, Bahamas, tender access
- Harvest Caye, Belize, pier access

==== MSC Cruises ====
- Ocean Cay MSC Marine Reserve, Bahamas, pier access
- Sir Bani Yas Island 'Beach Oasis' at Sir Bani Yas, Abu Dhabi, United Arab Emirates

=== List of high-profile island owners ===
- Gianni Agnelli, Estate of – Dino Island off the Calabria until 2014.
- Pamela Anderson – Greece in The World, United Arab Emirates
- Richard Branson – Necker Island & Moskito Island, British Virgin Islands; and Makepeace Island Australia.
- Raymond Burr – Naitauba, Fiji between 1965 and 1983
- Nicolas Cage – Leaf Cay, Bahamas although it has been on sale since 2022
- Amar Desai - Nova Scotia, Canada
- David Copperfield – Musha Cay, Bahamas
- Edward de Bono who passed away in 2021 – Green Island, Australia until 1999; Tessera, Italy (dates unknown); West Skeam Island, Ireland until 2002; Reklusia, Bahamas
- Leonardo DiCaprio – Blackadore Caye, Belize
- Celine Dion – Île Gagnon, Quebec.
- Larry Ellison – 98% of Lanai, one of the Hawaiian Islands.
- Jeffrey Epstein – Little Saint James until his death in 2019
- Disney family – Echo Island, San Juan Islands, Washington, US
- Du Pont family – Cherry Island, Chesapeake Bay, Maryland, US
- Errol Flynn – Navy Island, Port Antonio, Jamaica somewhere between 1940 and his death in 1959
- Mel Gibson – Mago Island, Fiji
- Bear Grylls – St. Tudwal's Island West, Wales, UK
- Gene Hackman – Fawn Island, San Juan Islands, Washington State, US up to either 2005 or 2008
- Nick Hexum – Melody Key, Florida
- Faith Hill and Tim McGraw – Goat Cay, Exuma, Bahamas
- Jim Jannard – Kaibu Island & Vatu Vara Island, Fiji; and Spieden Island, San Juan Islands, Washington State, US
- Dean Kamen – North Dumpling Island, New York, US
- John Lennon – Dorinish Island in Clew Bay, County Mayo, Ireland
- Ricky Martin – Angra dos Reis, Brazil
- Dietrich Mateschitz – Laucala, Fiji
- Eddie Murphy – Rooster Cay, Bahamas
- Peter Nygård – Nygard Cay, Bahamas
- Aristotle Onassis – Skorpios Island, Greece
- Michael Ondaatje – Several islands, Mahone Bay, Nova Scotia, Canada
- Roberto Ongpin – Balesin Island, in Polillo, Quezon, Philippines
- Baron Rothschild – Bell Island, Bahamas
- Steven Spielberg – two islands, in an undisclosed location in the Madeira Archipelago
- Ted Turner – St. Phillips Island, South Carolina, US
- Robin Williams – Pender Harbour, British Columbia, Canada

== See also ==
- Uninhabited island
- List of islands
- List of uninhabited regions
- Phantom island
- Principality of Sealand
- Category:Uninhabited islands
