= The Big Country (Hamilton novel) =

Book by Donald Hamilton

- Paperback original
- Author: Donald Hamilton
- Language: English
- Genre: Western novel
- Publisher: Dell Publishing
- Publication date: 1958
- Publication place: United States
- Media type: Print (Paperback)

The Big Country is a Western novel by Donald Hamilton. It was originally serialized in The Saturday Evening Post as Ambush at Blanco Canyon. Published two years prior to Hamilton's Death of a Citizen, which launched his popular Matt Helm series, it explores many of the same themes of self-reliance that dominated the author's work.

== Plot summary ==
Maryland sea captain James McKay goes west to Texas, to claim his bride, and steps into a violent feud over water.

== Film adaptation ==
The novel was adapted into a film of the same name in 1958 starring Gregory Peck, Jean Simmons, Carroll Baker, Charlton Heston, Charles Bickford, Burl Ives and Chuck Connors. The film adaptation was mostly faithful to the plot of the novel, while simplifying the story and eliminating some characters.

== Comic book adaptation ==
The Big Country comics

== Publication history ==
- 1957, US, The Saturday Evening Post, as Ambush at Blanco Canyon, 2/2/1957, 2/9/1957, 2/16/1957, 2/23/1957, serial (literature)
- 1958, US, Dell, Dell First Edition B115, paperback, reissued many times
- 1958, US, Dell Comics, Dell Four Color #946, comic
- 1958, UK, Allan Wingate, hardcover
