= Woody Brown (actor) =

American actor

- Born: Woodward Allen Brown; February 26, 1956 (age 70); Dayton, Ohio, U.S.
- Occupation: Actor

Woody Brown (born February 26, 1956) is an American actor, best known for his role as Skipper Weldon in the 1980s television series Flamingo Road and as Danny, the main rapist, in the movie The Accused.

Brown was born in Dayton, Ohio, and attended the University of Michigan, where he played football as a defensive back, helping the Wolverines make two Rose Bowl appearances, and one Orange Bowl.

Other TV credits include: Love of Life, The Love Boat, Knight Rider, The Facts of Life, Dynasty, JAG and Roswell.
