= Wind from the Carolinas =

1964 novel by Robert Wilder

Wind From the Carolinas
- Cover of original 1964 edition
- Author: Robert Wilder
- Language: English
- Genre: Novel
- Publication date: 1964
- Publication place: United States
- Media type: Print (hardcover and paperback)
- Pages: 635 (Hardback)
- Preceded by: Plough the Sea
- Followed by: Fruit of the Poppy

Wind from the Carolinas is a 1964 novel by Robert Wilder based on the history of a Bahamas family of American loyalists. It was first published by G.P. Putnam's, New York and re-published by Bluewater Books & Charts in 1997.

== Plot ==
Set against the exotic background of the Bahama Islands, it's the saga of wealthy, aristocratic, loyalist families from the Carolinas, Georgia, and Virginia who, following the American Revolution, fled the South for the Bahamas, where they remained loyal to England. Abandoning their plantations for the islands, they established new dynasties in the Bahamas, where the Crown rewarded their loyalty with huge grants of land.

"Wind from the Carolinas is fiction and as such certain liberties have been taken but not with the basic facts. Certainly, the settlement of the Bahama Islands was the result of one of the most dramatic of migrations. From the plantation aristocracy of Carolina, Virginia and Georgia came families who were passionately sincere in their loyalty to the British Crown and wanted nothing to do with the American Revolution and its theory of democracy. At the close of the War for Independence they found life all but unendurable. They were hated and reviled as Tories by what they considered to be a disorganized rabble. They were subjected to taunts and violence. At their request transports of the Royal Navy took entire families, their slaves, livestock, furnishings, and in some cases, even the bricks of their manors to the Bahamas. There they attempted to recreate the Colonial magnificence they had known with mansions, slave quarters and vast cotton fields. The failure was tragic and the history of the Out Islands has been one of wealth and poverty in cycles brought about by influences far beyond their shores." - Robert Wilder, Author
