= The Big Country =

1958 film directed by William Wyler

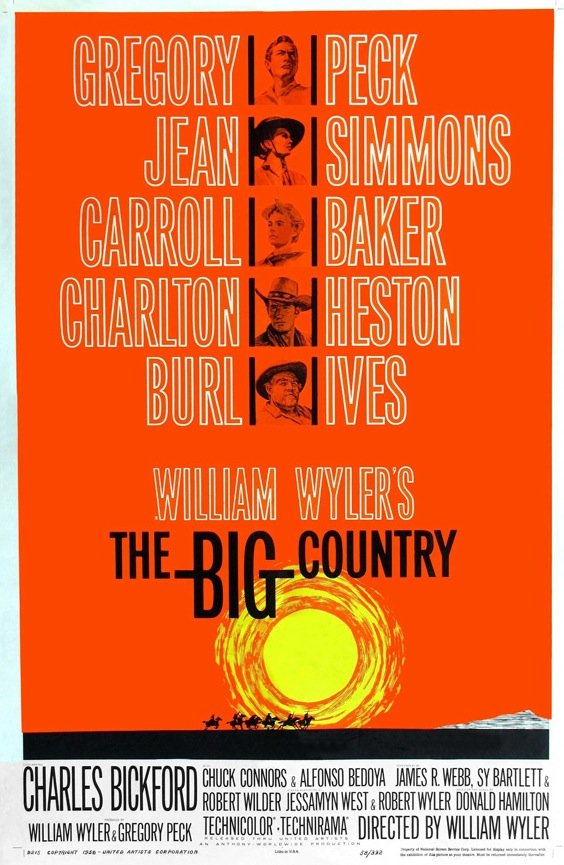
- Theatrical release poster by Saul Bass
- Directed by: William Wyler
- Screenplay by: James R. Webb; Sy Bartlett; Robert Wilder
- Story by: Jessamyn West; Robert Wyler
- Based on: Ambush at Blanco Canyon by Donald Hamilton
- Produced by: William Wyler; Gregory Peck
- Starring: Gregory Peck; Jean Simmons; Charlton Heston; Carroll Baker; Burl Ives; Charles Bickford; Chuck Connors
- Cinematography: Franz F. Planer
- Edited by: Robert Belcher; John Faure; Robert Swink (sup)
- Music by: Jerome Moross
- Production company: Anthony-Worldwide Productions
- Distributed by: United Artists
- Release date: August 13, 1958 (Atlantic City)
- Running time: 166 minutes
- Country: United States
- Languages: English; Spanish
- Box office: $3.5 million (US and Canada rentals)

The Big Country is a 1958 American epic Western film directed by William Wyler, and starring Gregory Peck, Jean Simmons, Carroll Baker, Charlton Heston, and Charles Bickford. The supporting cast features Burl Ives and Chuck Connors. Filmed in Technicolor and Technirama, the picture was based on the serialized magazine novel Ambush at Blanco Canyon by Donald Hamilton and was co-produced by Wyler and Peck. The opening title sequence was created by Saul Bass. This was also the final film role for Alfonso Bedoya.

Ives won the Academy Award as Best Supporting Actor for his performance, as well as the Golden Globe Award. The film was also nominated for an Academy Award for the musical score, composed by Jerome Moross. The film is one of the few in which Heston plays a major supporting role rather than the lead.

== Plot ==
Former sea captain James McKay travels to the American West to join his fiancée Patricia Terrill at the enormous ranch owned by her father, Henry "the Major" Terrill. After a meeting with Patricia's friend, schoolteacher Julie Maragon, McKay and Patricia are accosted by a group of drunks led by Buck Hannassey, the son of the Major's implacable enemy, Rufus Hannassey. The Major and Rufus have a longstanding, destructive feud over water access for cattle. Despite the harassment and mockery, McKay surprises Patricia by making light of the incident, stating that he has experienced worse hazing, and the drunken boys meant no harm.

The next morning, McKay declines an invitation from foreman Steve Leech to ride an indomitable bronco stallion named "Old Thunder", noting that the infatuated Leech is counting on him to fail in Patricia's eyes. Patricia expresses disappointment that McKay did not participate in the Ladder Ranch tradition of attempting to ride Old Thunder. McKay presents a pair of dueling pistols once owned by his father to the Major as a gift. When the Major learns of Buck's harassment the previous day, he gathers his men and raids the Hannassey ranch, despite McKay's attempts to defuse the situation. Finding neither Rufus nor Buck, the Major's group of 20 men settle for terrorizing the Hannassey women and children, shooting holes in their water reservoir. Finding Buck's posse in town, they beat and humiliate three Hannassey men. Meanwhile, McKay privately tames and rides Old Thunder after many attempts, swearing to privacy his only witness, ranch hand Ramon Gutierrez.

A gala is held at Ladder Ranch in honor of Patricia's upcoming wedding. At the height of the festivities, an armed Rufus crashes the party, accusing the Major of hypocrisy in pretending to be a gentleman when his actions are dishonorable. The next day, McKay secretly goes to Julie Maragon's abandoned ranch, the "Big Muddy", the property at the center of the Terrill-Hannassey dispute. With the only river nearby running through Big Muddy, access is vital for both herds during drought. McKay persuades Julie to sell him the ranch, hoping to both secure a wedding gift for Patricia and end the conflict by ensuring the Maragon tradition of unrestricted access to the river. When McKay is missing for hours, Patricia presumes McKay is lost in unfamiliar country and sends Leech leading a search party for McKay; Leech is surprised when McKay shows up at their camp.

Upon returning to Ladder Ranch, Leech calls McKay a liar when McKay explains he was never lost or in danger, having used naval navigation techniques to plot his course. Again, McKay refuses to be goaded into a fight, disappointing Patricia enough to make the pair reconsider their engagement. Before dawn and without an audience, McKay challenges Leech to an outdoor fistfight. The prolonged fight ends in a draw. In the morning, Julie tells Patricia of McKay's purchase of the Big Muddy as a wedding gift for her, which convinces Patricia to make amends with McKay. When McKay expresses that he doesn't need to constantly prove his worth to her and that he plans to allow the Hannasseys equal access to water, Patricia returns the dueling pistols, and they break up for good.

Wanting to lure the Major into an ambush in the canyon leading to his homestead, Rufus takes Julie hostage. Although McKay personally promises Rufus equal access to the water, he confronts Buck over Julie's abduction, which Rufus suggests be settled honorably with a duel. Acting as moderator, Rufus prepares McKay's old dueling pistols. Buck fires before the signal, his single bullet grazing McKay's forehead and leaving Buck open to be shot by McKay. In a display of cowardice, Buck crawls under a wagon; McKay scornfully delopes to spare him. The humiliated Buck snatches another gun from a nearby cowboy and aims for McKay, prompting Rufus to shoot Buck. With his son now dead, Rufus then goes to the canyon for a final confrontation with the Major, challenging him to a one-on-one showdown. Armed with rifles, the two old men advance and kill one another.

The hostilities end, and McKay and Julie, clearly falling in love, ride off together with Ramon to start a new life together.

== Cast ==
- Gregory Peck as James McKay
- Jean Simmons as Julie Maragon
- Carroll Baker as Patricia Terrill
- Charlton Heston as Steve Leech
- Burl Ives as Rufus Hannassey
- Charles Bickford as Maj. Henry Terrill
- Alfonso Bedoya as Ramón Gutierrez
- Chuck Connors as Buck Hannassey
- Chuck Hayward as Rafe Hannassey
- Buff Brady as Dude Hannassey
- Jim Burk as Blackie / Cracker Hannassey
- Dorothy Adams as Hannassey Woman
- Chuck Roberson as Terrill Cowboy

== Production ==
"The Big Country"
Main theme from the film by Jerome Moross.

Robert Wyler and Jessamyn West wrote the first screenplay for the film based on the Donald Hamilton story that had been serialized in The Saturday Evening Post. Leon Uris wrote a second screenplay, and Robert Wilder wrote another, with the final script by James R. Webb and Sy Bartlett. After arbitration, Webb, Bartlett, and Wilder received screenplay credit and Wyler and West received adaptation credit. Uris was not given credit, as his script deviated too much from the original story.

Director William Wyler was known for shooting an excessive number of takes on his films, usually without explaining to the actors what to do differently except "[make it] better", and this one was no exception. Many of the actors, including Jean Simmons and Carroll Baker, were so traumatized by his directing style that they refused to speak about the experience for years. Simmons later said they constantly received rewrites for the script, making acting extremely difficult. Gregory Peck and Wyler, who were good friends, fought constantly on the set and had a falling out for three years, although they later reconciled. Wyler and Charles Bickford also clashed, as they had done 30 years previously on the production of his 1929 film Hell's Heroes. Burl Ives, however, claimed to have enjoyed making the film.

Before principal photography was complete, Wyler left for Rome to start work on Ben-Hur, delegating creation of the final scenes involving McKay and Maragon to his assistant Robert Swink, whose resulting scenes pleased Wyler so much that he wrote Swink a letter stating: "I can't begin to tell you how pleased I am with the new ending.... The shots you made are complete perfection."

=== Locations ===
The Blanco Canyon scenes were filmed in California's Red Rock Canyon State Park in the Mojave Desert. The ranch and field scenes with greenery were filmed at Snow Ranch in the Sierra Nevada foothills near the town of Farmington in central California. Snow Ranch was also used for the pilot of Little House on the Prairie (1974) as well as additional Little House episodes in the following years. Other movies filmed there include Sam Whiskey (1969 - Burt Reynolds); Coast to Coast (1980 - Robert Blake & Dyan Cannon) and Shout (1991 - John Travolta). Presently a working cattle ranch in its 153rd year, it is also used during winter months (as a lower fire risk) by a club of the National Association of Rocketry for launches of model and mid- and high-power amateur rockets. The site is playfully dubbed "Snow Ranch Spaceport".

== Release ==
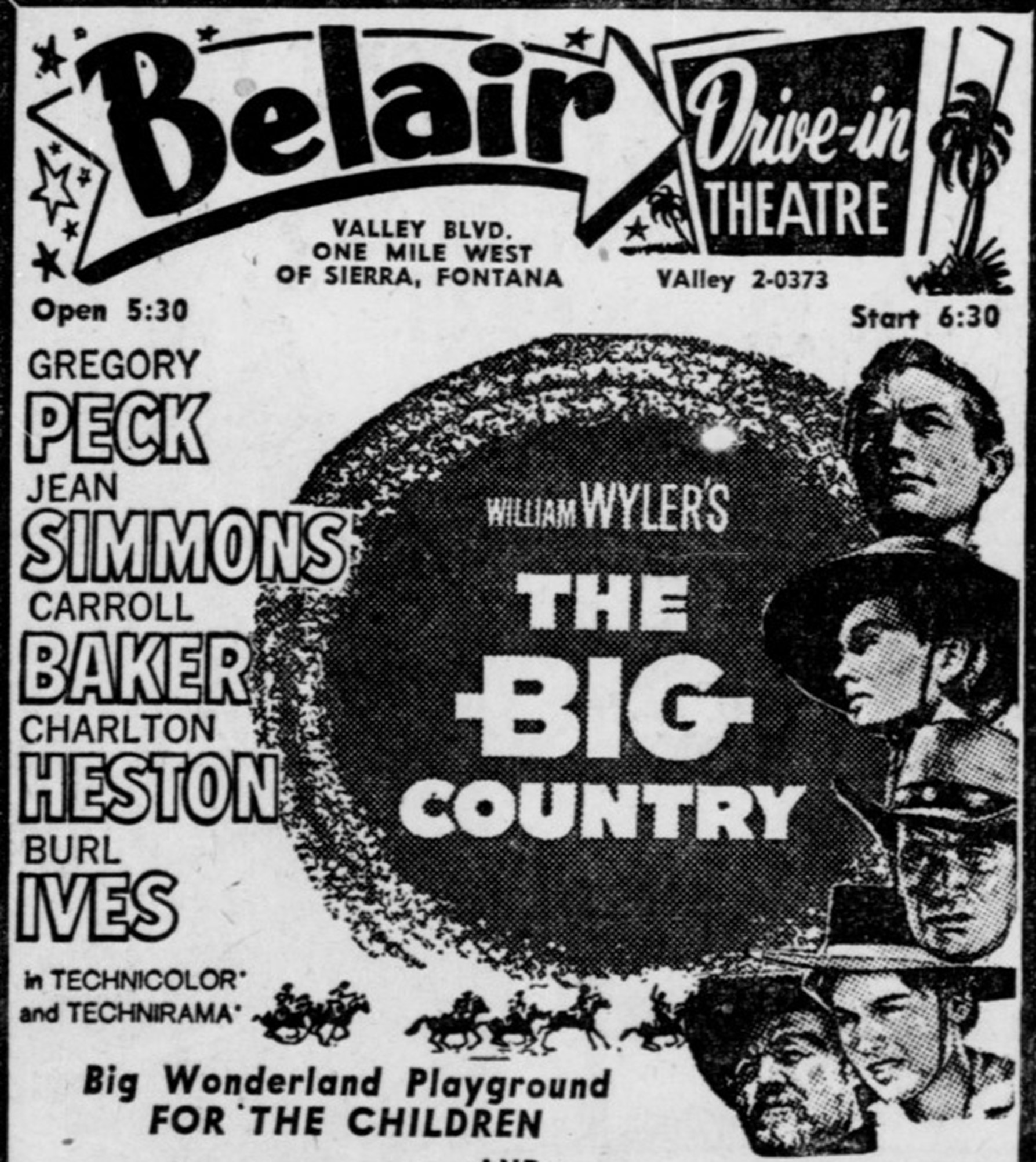
Drive-in advertisement from 1958

The Big Country opened in Atlantic City, New Jersey on August 13, 1958, with a California premiere following on August 22, 1958, at the Warner Beverly Hills Theater.

=== Home media ===
MGM Home Entertainment released the film on DVD as part of their Western Legends line on March 20, 2001. A Blu-ray edition followed on November 1, 2011. Kino Lorber released newly-remastered DVD and Blu-ray editions on June 5, 2018, commemorating the film's 60th anniversary.

== Reception ==
=== Critical response ===
Bosley Crowther of The New York Times wrote in a negative review, "for all this film's mighty pretensions, it does not get far beneath the skin of its conventional Western situation and its stock Western characters. It skims across standard complications and ends on a platitude. Peace is a pious precept, but fightin' is more excitin'. That's what it proves." Variety called the film "one of the best photography jobs of the year", with a "serviceable, adult" storyline "which should find favor with audiences of all tastes." Harrison's Reports declared it "a first-rate super-Western, beautifully photographed in the Technirama anamorphic process and Technicolor. It is a long picture, perhaps too long for what the story has to offer, but there is never a dull moment from start to finish and it holds one's interest tightly throughout." Richard L. Coe of The Washington Post called it "super stuff. Franz Planer's photography of Texas is downright awe-inspiring, the characters are solid, the story line firm, the playing first-rate, the music more than dashing in this nearly three-hour tale which should delight everybody."

John McCarten of The New Yorker wrote, "Of those involved in this massive enterprise, Mr. Bickford and Mr. Ives are the most commendable as they whoop and snort about the sagebrush. But even they are hardly credible types, and as for the rest of the cast, they can be set down as a rather wooden lot." Philip K. Scheuer of the Los Angeles Times called the film "too self consciously 'epical' to be called great, but at its best, which is frequently, it's better than good." The Monthly Film Bulletin wrote that the picture's attempts to convey a message were for the most part "superficial and pedestrian," and found that "the pivotal character of McKay, played on a monotonously self-righteous note by Gregory Peck, never comes alive. It is mainly due to the power of the climactic canyon battle, and Burl Ives' interesting playing as Rufus, that this remains a not unsympathetic film, decorated pleasantly by Jean Simmons and with spirit by Carroll Baker."

The film was a big hit, being the second-most popular movie in Britain in 1959. On review aggregation website Rotten Tomatoes, the film has an approval rating of 100% based on 13 reviews, with an average rating of 7.4/10.

President Dwight D. Eisenhower liked the movie so much, he screened it on four successive evenings in the White House during his second administration.

Playmobil designed an entire cowboy line based on the architecture of the film.

In a poll of 500 films held by Empire, it was voted 187th-greatest movie of all time.

=== Accolades ===
Ives won the Academy Award as Best Supporting Actor, as well as a Golden Globe Award. The film was also nominated for an Academy Award for the musical score by Jerome Moross.

Award nominations for The Big Country
| Award | Category | Nominee(s) | Result |
|---|---|---|---|
| Academy Awards | Best Supporting Actor | Burl Ives | Won |
| Academy Awards | Best Scoring of a Dramatic or Comedy Picture | Jerome Moross | Nominated |
| British Academy Film Awards | Best Film from any Source | | Nominated |
| Directors Guild of America Awards | Outstanding Directorial Achievement in Motion Pictures | William Wyler | Nominated |
| Golden Globe Awards | Best Supporting Actor – Motion Picture | Burl Ives | Won |
| Kinema Junpo Awards | Best Foreign Language Film | William Wyler | Won |
| Laurel Awards | Top Action Drama | | Nominated |
| Laurel Awards | Top Score | Jerome Moross | Nominated |

== Preservation ==
The Academy Film Archive preserved The Big Country in 2006.

== Comic book ==
A comic-book adaptation of the novel and tie-in to the movie was first released in 1957.

Written by long-time Western comics writer Paul S. Newman, and drawn by Bob Correa, The Big Country was initially serialized in The Saturday Evening Post as "Ambush at Blanco Canyon" on February 2, 9, 16 and 23, 1957.

The story was collected for the first time in 1958, by Dell, as a Dell First Edition B115 paperback, and was reissued many times. In Aug. of 1958, the story was published by Dell Comics, as issue #946 of Dell's long-running showcase anthology Four Color Comics.

== See also ==
- List of American films of 1958
