= Musha Cay =

Private island in the southern Bahamas

- Location in the Bahamas

Geography
- Location: Atlantic Ocean
- Coordinates: 23°53′35″N 76°15′40″W
- Type: Cay
- Archipelago: Lucayan Archipelago

Administration
- Bahamas

Additional information
- Official website: www.mushacay.com

Musha Cay is a 700-acre (280 ha), privately owned island in the Exuma Chain, in the southern Bahamas. It is located 85 miles (137 km) southeast of Nassau. It is owned by illusionist David Copperfield.

Musha Cay is surrounded by three smaller islands that maintain its guests' privacy. There can only be one group of guests, numbering up to twenty-four, at any one time.

Google co-founder Sergey Brin was married on Musha Cay in May 2007.

Professional wrestler Adam Rose was billed from Musha Cay during his time in WWE.

Howard Holtzman is the architect for Musha Cay.
