= Aliv =

Aliv is a Bahamian telecommunications brand operated by NewCo15Limited which is 48.25% owned by Cable Bahamas and 51.75% by the Bahamian public. Their headquarters are in Nassau and their chief executive is Franklyn Butler II.

It is the second mobile telecommunications company licensed in The Bahamas. Since there was only one mobile carrier in the Bahamas previously, mobile number portability was not introduced until April 2017.

BTC Bahamas and Aliv have a roaming agreement which allows customers of either telecommunications provider to use their phone when out of range of the primary providers cellular tower, but within range of the roaming provider's tower. Roaming may or may not incur charges for the cellular subscriber. In the case of BTC and Aliv, customers do not incur roaming charges though the agreements did not appear to not have been completely finalized as of 2019.

Aliv has been a fast growing alternative to BTC Bahamas, initially providing service in Nassau / New Providence island and then expanding to what are known as "The Family Islands" or Out Islands in the remainder of the Bahamian archipelago. It has been regarded by some as a more reliable telecommunications provider than BTC Bahamas, especially during Hurricane Dorian.

Miss Bahamas partnered with Aliv in 2017.

There has been some controversy over Aliv's use of BTC Bahamas controlling shareholder, Liberty Global, as names of some of Aliv's service plans.

== Radio frequency summary ==
=== Radio frequency summary ===
Frequency range	Band number	Generation	Protocol	Status	Notes
850 MHz CLR	5	3G	UMTS/HSPA/HSPA+/DC-HSPA+	Active	
1900 MHz PCS	2	4G	LTE/LTE-A	Active	
1700 MHz AWS	4	4G	LTE/LTE-A	Active	
700 MHz Lower SMH Blocks B/C	13	4G	LTE/LTE-A	Active	
