= BDSNi =

Submarine communications cable

BDSNi (Bahamas Domestic Submarine Network international) is a fiber optic submarine communications cable system that links the islands of the Bahamas, and also provides connectivity to Haiti via a spur connection. The system was constructed by Tyco Telecommunications, a subsidiary of Tyco International.

== Connection to Haiti ==
As of 2010, BDSNi provided Haiti's only direct fibre-optic connectivity.

The spur connection to Haiti was disrupted by the 2010 Haiti earthquake, with the terminal in Port-au-Prince being completely destroyed.
