= BTC (The Bahamas) =

Telecommunication company in the Bahamas

- Formerly: The Bahamas Telecommunications Company Ltd. BaTelCo
- Industry: Wireless; Telecommunication; Broadband internet IPTV
- Founded: 1966; 60 years ago
- Founder: Government of the Bahamas
- Headquarters: Nassau, New Providence, Bahamas
- Area served: Bahamas
- Products: Mobile telephony Wireless broadband services Long distance Fixed line Broadband; IPTV
- Owner: Bahamian Government (49% voting / 49 economic); Cable & Wireless Communications (51%voting / 49% economic); National Trust (2% economic)
- Number of employees: Estimated 550
- Website: www.btcbahamas.com

BTC, or the Bahamas Telecommunications Company, is the primary telecommunications provider for the Bahamas, headquartered in Nassau, New Providence. It is partly government owned and offers telephone, internet and Wireless services.

BTC offers telephone, internet and wireless services. In New Providence and Grand Bahama, it operates a GSM-based EDGE, HSPA, HSPA+ and LTE network. The government of the Bahamas owns 49% of its economic shares and 49% of its voting shares. Cable & Wireless Communications owns 49% of its economic shares and 51% of its voting shares, and 2% of its economic shares are in a national trust.

== History ==
=== From 1892 to the late 1990s ===
In 1892, a telegraph cable was laid between Jupiter, Florida and the western district of New Providence, coming ashore in Goodman’s Bay, Bahamas. The area then became known as "Cable Beach." On October 5, 1906, the first telephone system was introduced with 150 subscribers in Nassau.

Wireless telegraphy was introduced to Bimini in 1920 and Grand Bahama opened its first Telegraph Station in West End in 1925. On December 16, 1933, the first telephone service to the United States from the Bahamas was introduced.

After World War II, the Telecommunications Department of The Bahamas began to make steady progress in its development. Frequency shifters, the first in the Caribbean, were installed in 1946. An automatic time of day announcer was installed in Nassau in 1951, the very first outside of the continental United States. Nine years later, in 1960, a forward tropospheric scatter was installed between Delaporte and Florida City, the second of its kind in this hemisphere, the first being in Cuba.

In 1966, the Government of The Bahamas, by an Act of Parliament, incorporated the Telecommunications Department as the Bahamas Telecommunications Corporation, a quasi-governmental corporation, known as Batelco. In 1967, the formerly expatriate-run Batelco got its first all-Bahamian executive team, under the direction of R.E. Knowles, the first Bahamian general manager.

In 1971, direct distance dialing was introduced for Batelco operators and in 1972, under new general manager Aubrey E. Curling, a $7 million submarine cable was installed from West Palm Beach to Eight Mile Rock through a joint venture agreement between AT&T and Batelco.

Robert Bartlett took the reins of the Corporation on October 15, 1979, becoming general manager. Under Bartlett’s administration, Batelco moved from its rented location in the Chase Building on Thompson Boulevard to its own offices on John F. Kennedy Drive, where the company’s headquarters are currently located.

In 1986 the Corporation joined the Caribbean Association of National Telecommunications Organizations (CANTO) and hosted its annual meeting and trade show. It also acquired the assets of The Grand Bahama Telephone Company. It was also in the late eighties that Cellular Telephone Service was inaugurated in the Bahamas.

In 1990, Robert Bartlett retired and Barrett Russell succeeded him as general manager. In February 1992, fibre-optics became a part of the Batelco system, enabling system upgrades throughout the archipelago, including Inagua, where service was introduced in March of that year.

Sir Albert Miller took over as executive chairman of Batelco in 1995. An agreement was signed on April 10, 1996 for the engineering and installation of the Bahamas II Submarine Cable and, on August 26, Batelco entered the internet market with the introduction of Batelnet.

The 1990s ended with the introduction of CLASS to residential customers, bringing them caller ID, automatic recall and a number of other features. The end of the millennium also saw significant upgrades to its fibre-optic system, including a 26 million dollar cable between Vero Beach, Florida and Eight Mile Rock owned by a consortium with Batelco and AT&T as the terminal parties.

=== From Batelco to BTC (2002–2011) ===
The government, under Prime Minister Hubert Ingraham, announced plans to privatise Batelco by the end of 1999, during the dot-com boom, but backed down.

On September 4, 2002, Batelco's operations were transferred to a new body named BTC, which received an interim licence in accordance with the Telecommunications Act of 1999. The government also wanted to find a strategic investor for BTC.

In the mid-2000s, the GSM (Global System for Mobile Communications) telephone system was introduced and replaced TDMA (Time Division Multiple Access).

During this time, the submarine BDSNi cable was introduced, connecting 14 islands of the Bahamas. The network was constructed by Tyco Telecommunications, a subsidiary of Tyco International.

In 2006, the Bahamas Haiti International (BHi) marked the first time BTC partnered with another nation. Using the BDSNi cable, BTC links Port-au-Prince, Haiti with Matthew Town, Inagua, connecting the neighbouring nation with Vibe, I-Connect, GSM, Wi-Fi and other products and services.

In 2007 BTC partnered with Cisco Systems to build a new Multiprotocol Label Switching (MPLS) backbone. This new network allowed BTC to provide new Internet Protocol (IP) services to their customers.

In late 2007, in conjunction with the Ministry of Health, BTC tested a pilot program that allowed medical experts in New Providence to read the vital signs of a patient located at a Ministry of Health clinic in Coopers Town, Abaco.

During 2007 the Six Sigma program was created to reduce the response time to both fault resolution and the installation of services. The Universal Customer Service Representative (CSR), was designed to allow a CSR to work across different technologies, products and services, serving as a “one-stop shop” for BTC customers.

In 2008, a new online directory, bahamasypages.com was also introduced.

=== Privatisation (2011 to present) ===
On April 6, 2011, the Government of The Bahamas and the London-based Cable & Wireless Communications (CWC) signed an agreement privatising The Bahamas Telecommunications Company, and transferred 51% of the public corporation to CWC for a purchase price of $210 million. New payment methods, including online minute-loading, were introduced. The elimination of long distance charges between islands for calls originating from cell phones was introduced, and a half-million dollar expansion transformed what had been an administrative complex into the largest CWC store in the Caribbean. BTC also began a multimillion-dollar network overhaul to shift its data traffic from 2.5G speed to 4G. In 2014, after a change in government, a 2% share of the company – and controlling interest in BTC – was transferred from CWC back to the government.

As of 2012, BTC operated around 137,000 fixed telephone lines, 254,000 mobile telephone lines.

== Services ==
=== Broadband and Data ===
- DSL Speed Test
- Wi-Fi
- I-Connect (DSL)
- My I-connect (email)
- Vibe Unite
- Metro Ethernet
- Talk It Up Calling Card
- EZTop-Up

=== Wireless ===
- Prepaid
- PostPaid
- Roaming
- Handsets
- Mobile to Mobile TopUp
- iText (international texting)
- MMS
- VoLTE

==== Radio frequency summary ====
| Frequency range | Band number | Generation | Protocol | Status | Notes |
|---|---|---|---|---|---|
| 850 MHz CLR | 5 | 2G | GSM/GPRS/EDGE | Active | |
| 1900 MHz PCS | 2 | 3G | UMTS/HSPA/HSPA+/DC-HSPA+ | Active | |
| 850 MHz CLR | 5 | 3G | UMTS/HSPA/HSPA+/DC-HSPA+ | Active | |
| 1900 MHz PCS | 2 | 4G | LTE/LTE-A | Active | |
| 1700 MHz AWS | 4 | 4G | LTE/LTE-A | Active | |
| 700 MHz Lower SMH Blocks B/C | 12/17 | 4G | LTE/LTE-A | Active | |

=== Voice ===
- C.L.A.S.S.
- Telephone Service
- HomePhone Plus

=== Enterprise Services ===
- Key Systems and PBX
- Corporate Internet
- Leased Lines & Data Circuits
- Business Lines
- Satellite Broadcast Services
- International Toll Free

== Retail locations ==
There are currently 40 BTC retail stores throughout the entire Bahamas.

On October 13, 2012, the first BTC franchise location was opened on the island of Grand Bahama in the Britannia Plaza, on Polaris Drive.
