= Killers of Kilimanjaro =

1959 British film by Richard Thorpe

- Theatrical film poster
- Directed by: Richard Thorpe
- Screenplay by: John Gilling
- Based on: story by Cyril Hume and Richard Maibaum from book African Bush Adventures by J. Hunter and Daniel P. Mannix
- Produced by: John R. Sloan executive Irving Allen; Albert R. Broccoli
- Starring: Robert Taylor; Anthony Newley
- Cinematography: Ted Moore
- Edited by: Geoffrey Foot
- Music by: William Alwyn
- Production company: Warwick Films
- Distributed by: Columbia Pictures
- Release date: 24 September 1959
- Running time: 91 minutes
- Country: United Kingdom
- Language: English

Killers of Kilimanjaro is a 1959 British CinemaScope adventure film directed by Richard Thorpe and starring Robert Taylor, Anthony Newley, Anne Aubrey and Donald Pleasence for Warwick Films.

The film was originally known as Adamson of Africa.

== Plot ==
Robert Adamson arrives in Kilimanjaro to complete the building of a railroad that has stalled in production. When he arrives he finds there is competition to build the railroad. Complicating things is his promise to Jane Carlton to help her find her father, an engineer who disappeared while surveying for the railroad. He also meets a boy named Pasha who he promises a ride on the railroad once it's completed.

He manages to acquire porters and with Jane and Hooky, his assistant, departs on a train to reach the current end of the railroad. Pasha stows away on the train.

== Main cast ==
- Robert Taylor as Robert Adamson
- Anthony Newley as Hooky Hook
- Anne Aubrey as Jane Carlton
- Donald Pleasence as Captain
- Grégoire Aslan as Ben Ahmed
- Allan Cuthbertson as Saxton
- Martin Benson as Ali
- Orlando Martins as Chief
- John Dimech as Pasha
- Martin Boddey as Gunther

== Production ==
=== Development ===
Warwick Films was a British-based production company that specialised in making adventure stories with an American film star in the lead. It had made three films in Africa, Safari, Zarak and Odongo. Warwick announced Killers of Kilimanjaro in April 1956 under the title African Bush Adventure as part of a three-year slate of films worth $17 million. The story was inspired by the story of the Tsavo maneaters recounted in the 1954 book African Bush Adventures by J.A. Hunter and Daniel P. Mannix.

In July 1956 Warwick announced the title would be Adamson of Africa and would be written by Richard Maibaum and Cyril Hume. (Warwick also announced they would make a second African film, the musical The Golden Fiddle, which would ultimately not be made.)

Another screenplay was done by Peter Viertel, who had worked on The African Queen, and written a novel of the experiences called White Hunter, Black Heart. In September 1957 Alan Ladd, who had made three films for Warwick, was the announced as male lead – it was meant to be part of a six-picture deal between Ladd and Warwick worth $2 million that also included The Man Inside and It's Always Four O'Clock. In the final event Ladd made no further films for Warwick - the lead role went to Robert Taylor. Taylor signed in January 1959 at which time the film was called African Bush. Co-stars Anthony Newley and Anne Aubrey were under contract to Warwick, and had just made Idol on Parade for the company.

=== Shooting ===
In February 1959 Taylor left for Moshi, Tanganyika where the film was shot on location. That was the same location used for Mogambo and Tarzan's Greatest Adventure. Production was completed by April. Albert Broccoli accompanied the unit to Africa while Irving Allen stayed in London.

== Release ==
In April 1959 it was announced the film's title would be changed to Killers of Kilimanjaro. This upset Chief Thomas Marealle of the Chagga tribe, on whose lands the film was shot, and he made an official complaint. Mount Kilimanjaro lies about 125 kilometres (78 mi) west of Tsavo in Tanzania.

== Reception ==
=== Critical ===
Variety wrote that the film "doesn't go beating around “the bush” in search of a new dramatic path through Africa. It simply forges relentlessly down the same old cliche-infested trail traveled by so many past film safaris. Luckily, though, it's stripped for action, an approach that's never gone out of style at the boxoffice. Add to this the vicarious appeal of touring the dark continent via CinemaScope and technicolor, and you have entertainment that will more than hold its own in America's ticket-stub jungle."

The Monthly Film Bulletin said "enthusiasts for screen slaughter should be amply entertained."

The New York Times called it "a compendium of jungle cliches".

According to Jeffrey Richards, movies such as Killers of Kilimanjaro pushed the narrative that the British were not in East Africa to further their own ends, but instead perpetuated the myth that they were there to protect the natives from the evil Arab slavers. Filmink wrote the movie was "not very good".

=== Box office ===
In November 1959 Josh Billings reported in Kinematograph Weekly "I wouldn't call Killers of Kilimanjaro... a smash hit but it's not doing at all badly. The Warwick outfit knows its stuff when it comes to catering for the masses and youngsters." It appears the movie was not particularly successful at the box office. According to academic Jon Cowans:

Killers of Kilimanjaro premiered in London in 1959 and the United States in 1960, by which time more than a dozen African countries were independent. Although it is hard to prove why this impressive-looking CinemaScope film with a major American star missed the box-office charts, perhaps by this time trailblazers of empire in Africa seemed dated.

== See also ==
- Men Against the Sun (1952)
