= James Booth =

English actor (1927–2005)

- Born: David Noel Geeves; 19 December 1927; Croydon, Surrey, England
- Died: 11 August 2005 (aged 77); Hadleigh, Essex, England
- Other name: David Geeves-Booth
- Occupations: Actor; screenwriter
- Years active: 1958–2005
- Spouse: Paula Delaney (m. 1960)
- Children: 4

James Booth (born David Noel Geeves; 19 December 1927 – 11 August 2005) was an English film, stage and television actor and screenwriter. He is best known for his role as Private Henry Hook in Zulu.

Variety called him "a punchy blend of toughness, potential evil and irresistible charm."

== Early life and career ==
David Noel Geeves was born in Croydon, Surrey, on 19 December 1927, the son of Salvation Army probation officer Captain Ernest Edward Geeves and Lillian Alice (née Edwards), also a Salvation Army officer. The Geeves family moved often due to their duties, serving mainly in working-class areas, where they were more financially comfortable than their neighbours; these early experiences of interacting with the working classes had a strong influence on Booth. Having been injured during World War I and left with recurring partial paralysis that affected his ability to walk, Ernest Geeves died in 1938 after suffering a stroke; Lillian subsequently married Salvation Army Lieutenant-Colonel Cliff Barnes.

Booth was educated at Southend Grammar School, which he left aged 17 to join the army. Having trained recruits in the use of the bayonet, he rose to the rank of Captain in tank transport. He spent several years working for an international trading company. However, his interest in acting soon took priority.

He successfully applied for a scholarship to the Royal Academy of Dramatic Art, where he studied from 1954 to 1956. Classmates included Albert Finney, Peter O'Toole, Alan Bates and Richard Harris. Early in his career, he was advised to change his name, "Geeves" being reminiscent of P. G. Wodehouse's fictional Jeeves.

Booth made his first professional appearance as a member of the Old Vic company in a production of Timon of Athens (1956) with Ralph Richardson. His first film role was a bit in The Narrowing Circle (1956) and he had a small part in The Girl in the Picture (1957).

=== Joan Littlewood ===
He joined Joan Littlewood's Theatre Workshop at the Theatre Royal, Stratford East in 1958. He appeared on stage in The Hostage (1958). For TV he appeared in The Iron Harp and episodes of William Tell and The Invisible Man.

Booth was in the cast of Sparrers Can't Sing. In 1960 he starred in the stage musical Fings Ain't Wot They Used T'Be which became a hit and Booth, who played its most pungent character, looked poised for stardom.

According to one obituary, "Booth seemed to excite the theatre like a fountain of high spirits, with his cockney voice and his mischievous way of expressing himself, sometimes teasing, sometimes truly... Booth's manner with an audience, which he took into his confidence, was so personal...The reason for Booth's success lay simply with his personality. His height also helped. He would loom over the footlights with a commandingly wide grin. And his unpretentious manner added to the ease with which these early performances were accepted."

=== Warwick Films ===
Producer Irving Allen signed Booth to an exclusive contract with Warwick Films. By this stage he met and married Paula Delaney and he would later say "I don't know what kind of mess my life would be in today if it hadn't been for Paula and Irving. I'm a very insecure person. I've always needed someone to give me security. And they both did."

Booth's first sizeable film role was in Jazz Boat (1960), directed by Ken Hughes for Warwick. That movie starred Anthony Newley and Anne Aubrey, who were also in Booth's next film, Let's Get Married (1960).

Hughes cast Booth in two more movies for Warwick, The Trials of Oscar Wilde (1960) with Peter Finch and In the Nick (1960) with Newley and Aubrey.

The financial failure of these films saw the end of Warwick, but Irving Allen then used Booth in a movie for a new company, The Hellions (1961), shot in South Africa. Booth appeared on TV in The Ruffians (1960) and The Great Gold Bullion Robbery (1960), as well as the Rank comedy In the Doghouse (1961).

In 1962 Booth spent a season with the Royal Shakespeare Company. He appeared in King Lear alongside Paul Scofield for Peter Brook. He also played in The Caretaker.

== Film stardom ==
Booth's first lead role came in Sparrows Can't Sing (1963) directed by Littlewood. He then made Zulu (1964), the film for which he is best remembered; he was billed above Michael Caine. Joseph E. Levine put him under contract.

Booth did Stray Cats and Empty Bottles (1964) for TV and played the lead in a comedy, French Dressing (1964), the feature debut of Ken Russell. It was a box office disappointment.

Booth was in Herb Gardner's play, A Thousand Clowns in London 1964. He starred in 90 Degrees in the Shade (1964), a thriller, and the comedy, The Secret of My Success (1965). Neither movie was popular. A proposed film with Peter Sellers, Barbu, never materialised.

Booth starred as Robin Hood in the stage musical Twang!! (1965), which was a troubled production (Littlewood resigned as director) and a notorious flop. Booth later claimed the failure of the musical put him out of work for a year.

Booth was a policeman in a heist movie, Robbery (1967), for Levine, alongside his Zulu co-star Stanley Baker. He did a comedy with Shirley MacLaine, The Bliss of Mrs. Blossom (1968) then Fräulein Doktor (1969) and The Vessel of Wrath (1970) for TV.

Booth went to Australia to make Adam's Woman (1970) and played Rod Taylor's best friend in The Man Who Had Power Over Women (1970). He worked with Taylor again in Darker Than Amber (1970). In 1970 he did The Alchemist at the Chichester Festival and had a support role in Macho Callahan (1970), then the lead in Revenge (1971).

In 1972, he appeared on stage in The Hostage for Joan Littlewood again. Booth returned to leads in the films Rentadick (1972) and Penny Gold (1973) and TV comedy Them (1972).

Booth could be seen in That'll Be the Day (1974), Percy's Progress (1974), The Confederacy of Wives (1975), Brannigan (1975), and I'm Not Feeling Myself Tonight (1976).

== Hollywood ==
Booth appeared on Broadway in 1975 in a production of Travesties. He then relocated to Hollywood and found work as a character actor in films like Airport '77 (1977), Murder in Peyton Place (1977), Wheels (1978), Evening in Byzantium (1978), Jennifer: A Woman's Story (1979), Caboblanco (1980), The Jazz Singer (1980) and Zorro: The Gay Blade (1981).

He also regularly guest starred on shows like Hart to Hart and The Fall Guy along with TV movies like Hotline and The Cowboy and the Ballerina (1984).

=== Screenwriting ===
When no one would offer Booth an acting job, he tried his hand at screenwriting and found opportunities in Hollywood. His first writing credit was Sunburn (1979).

He was in Pray for Death (1985) which he also wrote; he did double duty on Avenging Force (1986). He wrote the TV movie Stormin' Home (1985).

As an actor only he was in Bad Guys (1986). He played a pornography baron living in enforced exile in Spain in series 2 of Auf Wiedersehen, Pet in 1986 and was seen in Moon in Scorpio (1987), Deep Space (1988), The Lady and the Highwayman (1988), and Have a Nice Night (1990).

He wrote American Ninja 2: The Confrontation (1988) and American Ninja 4: The Annihilation (1990); he acted in the latter and was in episodes of Bergerac and Twin Peaks.

=== Later career ===
Later acting appearances included Gunsmoke: To the Last Man (1992), Inner Sanctum II (1994), The Breed (2001), Red Phone 2, and Keeping Mum (2005).

In later life Booth moved back to Britain. He never retired from performing.

== Personal life ==
He married Paula Delaney in 1960 and they had two sons and two daughters and lived in Buckinghamshire, Los Angeles and Hadleigh, Essex, where he died on 11 August 2005 aged 77. His last film – Keeping Mum – was dedicated to his memory.

== Filmography ==
=== Film ===
| Year | Title | Role | Notes |
|---|---|---|---|
| 1956 | The Narrowing Circle | Bit Role | Uncredited |
| 1957 | The Girl in the Picture | Office boy | Credited as David Greeves |
| 1960 | Jazz Boat | Spider Kelly | |
| 1960 | Let's Get Married | Photographer | |
| 1960 | The Trials of Oscar Wilde | Alfred Wood | |
| 1960 | In the Nick | Spider Kelly | |
| 1961 | The Hellions | Jubal | |
| 1961 | In the Doghouse | Bob Skeffington | |
| 1963 | Sparrows Can't Sing | Charlie Gooding | |
| 1964 | Zulu | Private Henry Hook VC | |
| 1964 | French Dressing | Jim | |
| 1965 | Ninety Degrees in the Shade | Vorell | |
| 1965 | The Secret of My Success | Arthur Tate | |
| 1967 | Robbery | Inspector George Langdon | |
| 1968 | The Bliss of Mrs. Blossom | Ambrose Tuttle | |
| 1969 | Fräulein Doktor | Meyer | |
| 1970 | Adam's Woman | Dyson | |
| 1970 | Darker than Amber | Burk | |
| 1970 | Macho Callahan | Harry Wheeler | |
| 1970 | The Man Who Had Power Over Women | Val Pringle | |
| 1971 | Revenge | Jim Radford | |
| 1972 | Rentadick | Simon Hamilton | |
| 1973 | That'll Be The Day | Mr MacLaine | |
| 1973 | Penny Gold | Matthews | |
| 1974 | Percy's Progress | Jeffcott | |
| 1975 | Brannigan | Charlie the Handle | |
| 1976 | I'm Not Feeling Myself Tonight | S.J. Nutbrown | |
| 1977 | Airport '77 | Ralph Crawford | |
| 1978 | Evening in Byzantium | Jack Conrad | |
| 1980 | Caboblanco | John Baker | |
| 1980 | The Jazz Singer | Paul Rossini | |
| 1981 | Zorro, The Gay Blade | Valasquez | |
| 1985 | Pray for Death | Willie Limehouse | |
| 1986 | Bad Guys | Lord Percy | |
| 1986 | Avenging Force | Admiral Brown | (also co-wrote) |
| 1987 | The Retaliator | Dr Brock | aka Programmed to Kill |
| 1988 | Deep Space | Dr Forsyth | |
| 1990 | American Ninja 4: The Annihilation | Mulgrew | |
| 1994 | Inner Sanctum II | Detective Hooper | |
| 2001 | The Breed | Fleming | |
| 2004 | The Pool | Patrick | |
| 2005 | Keeping Mum | Mr Brown | (final film role) |

=== Television ===
| Year | Title | Role | Notes |
|---|---|---|---|
| 1958–59 | The Adventures of William Tell | Various | 3 episodes |
| 1962 | Gunsmoke | Townsman (uncredited) | Episode: False Front (S8E15) |
| 1964 | First Night | Newton | Episode: Stray Cats and Empty Bottles |
| 1971 | Shirley's World | Edmund Remberg | Episode: A Mother's Touch |
| 1972 | Bonanza | Reverend | Episode: "Second Sight" |
| 1975 | The Sweeney | Vic Labbett | Episode: Poppy |
| 1978 | Wheels | Sir Phillip Sturdevant | Miniseries |
| 1982 | The Fall Guy | Ian Graham | Episode: Child's Play |
| 1985–93 | Minder | Godfrey and Toby 'Jug' Johnson | 2 episodes: Give Us This Day Arthur Daley's Bread and Gone with the Winchester |
| 1986 | Auf Wiedersehen, Pet | Kenny Ames | 8 episodes |
| 1990 | Bergerac | Nicholas Wolfe | Episode: All The Sad Songs |
| 1990–91 | Twin Peaks | Ernie Niles | 5 episodes |
| 1991 | Lovejoy | Mordechai Frobel | 1 episode |
| 2000 | The Bill | Freddy Walker | Episode: Crime and Punishment |

=== Theatre ===
| Year | Title | Role | Notes |
|---|---|---|---|
| 1956–57 | Richard III | | Old Vic, London |
| 1958 | The Hostage | IRA officer | Joan Littlewood's Theatre Workshop |
| 1958 | A Christmas Carol | Bob Cratchit | For the Theatre Workshop |
| 1959 | Fings Ain't Wot They Used T'Be | Tosher | Theatre Royal, Stratford |
| 1959 | The Hostage | IRA officer | Wyndham's Theatre |
| 1961–62 | The Fire Raisers | | Royal Court Theatre |
| 1962 | The Caretaker | Mick | |
| 1962 | The Comedy of Errors | | RSC, Stratford-on-Avon |
| 1962 | King Lear | Edmund | RSC, Stratford-on-Avon |
| 1965 | Twang!! | Robin Hood | Shaftesbury |
| 1973 | The Entertainer | Archie Rice | |
| 1975–76 | Travesties | James Joyce | RSC & Noel Coward Theatre, London & Ethel Barrymore Theatre, New York |
| 1987–88 | Peter Pan | Mr Darling/Captain James Hook | Tyne Theatre, Newcastle upon Tyne and Opera House |
