= Ted Moore =

South African-British cinematographer (1914–1987)

- Born: 7 August 1914; Benoni, Gauteng, South Africa
- Died: 1987 (aged 72–73); Surrey, England, U.K.
- Occupations: Cinematographer, camera operator
- Years active: 1939–1982

Ted Moore, BSC (7 August 1914 – 1987) was a South African-British cinematographer known for his work on seven of the James Bond films in the 1960s and early 1970s. He won the Academy Award for Best Cinematography for his work on Fred Zinnemann's A Man for All Seasons, and two BAFTA Awards for Best Cinematography for A Man for All Seasons and From Russia with Love.

== Biography ==
Born in South Africa, Moore moved to Great Britain at age sixteen, where from 1942 he served in the Royal Air Force during World War II. As a qualified pilot, he flew as a cameraman in DH Mosquitoes with the "Pinewood Military Film Unit" filming its bomber operations. During the war, he joined the film unit and began honing his craft.

After serving as a camera operator on such films as The African Queen, and the Irving Allen and Albert R. Broccoli's Warwick Films The Red Beret, Hell Below Zero, and The Black Knight, he was given the cinematography job for 1956's High Flight, set among a familiar scene for Moore, the Royal Air Force.

He worked on other Warwick Films, such as Cockleshell Heroes, Zarak, Johnny Nobody and No Time to Die as well as its high-minded 1960 production The Trials of Oscar Wilde.

In 1962, Broccoli and director Terence Young chose him as the cinematographer for an adaptation of Ian Fleming's Dr. No. Moore made another six Bond films; From Russia with Love (for which he won a BAFTA award), Goldfinger, and Thunderball. Moore also photographed Eon Productions film Call Me Bwana, and when Sean Connery left the film series, Moore was cinematographer on Shalako. He returned to Eon Productions for Diamonds Are Forever, Live and Let Die, and portions of The Man with the Golden Gun, on which he was replaced due to illness by Oswald Morris.

In addition, Moore won a BAFTA and an Oscar for his camerawork for A Man for All Seasons and thus became the first South African to win an Oscar. He also worked on The Day of the Triffids, The Prime of Miss Jean Brodie, The Golden Voyage of Sinbad, Orca, and Clash of the Titans.

Moore died in 1987.

== Filmography ==
- April in Portugal (1954)
- A Prize of Gold (1955)
- The Gamma People (1955)
- Odongo (1956)
- Zarak (1957)
- Interpol (1957)
- How to Murder a Rich Uncle (1957)
- High Flight (1957)
- No Time to Die (1958)
- The Man Inside (1958)
- Idol on Parade (1959)
- The Bandit of Zhobe (1959)
- Killers of Kilimanjaro (1959)
- Jazz Boat (1960)
- Let's Get Married (1960)
- The Trials of Oscar Wilde (1960)
- In the Nick (1960)
- Johnny Nobody (1961)
- The Hellions (1961)
- Mix Me a Person (1962)
- Dr. No (1962)
- The Day of the Triffids (1962)
- Nine Hours to Rama (1963)
- Call Me Bwana (1963)
- From Russia with Love (1963)
- Goldfinger (1964)
- The Amorous Adventures of Moll Flanders (1965)
- Thunderball (1965)
- A Man for All Seasons (1966)
- The Last Safari (1967)
- Prudence and the Pill (1968)
- Shalako (1968)
- The Prime of Miss Jean Brodie (1969)
- The Chairman (1969) (uncredited)
- Country Dance (1970)
- She'll Follow You Anywhere (1971)
- Diamonds Are Forever (1971)
- Psychomania (1973)
- Live and Let Die (1973)
- The Golden Voyage of Sinbad (1974)
- The Story of Jacob and Joseph (1974) (television film)
- The Man with the Golden Gun (1974)
- Sinbad and the Eye of the Tiger (1977)
- Orca (1977)
- Dominique (1978)
- The Martian Chronicles (1980) (miniseries; 3 episodes)
- Clash of the Titans (1981)
- Priest of Love (1981)
- Charles & Diana: A Royal Love Story (1982) (television film)

== Awards and nominations ==
Academy of Motion Picture Arts and Sciences

- Best Cinematography
  - A Man for All Seasons (won)

British Academy of Film and Television Arts

- Best Cinematography
  - From Russia with Love (won)
  - A Man for All Seasons (won)

British Society of Cinematographers

- Best Cinematography
  - From Russia with Love (won)
