= Anne Aubrey =

English actress

- Born: 1 January 1937 (age 89); London, England
- Occupation: Actress
- Years active: 1957–1961
- Spouses: Derren Nesbitt (m. 1961; div. 1973) Peter Blatchley (m. 1975)
- Children: 1

Anne Aubrey (born 1 January 1937) is a retired British film actress.

Aubrey was mainly active in Warwick Films in the 1950s and 1960s. She worked with Anthony Newley in such films as Idol on Parade (1959), Killers of Kilimanjaro (1959), The Bandit of Zhobe (1959), Jazz Boat (1960), Let's Get Married (1960) and In the Nick (1960). She also appeared in the western The Hellions (1961), opposite Richard Todd.

She was a guest for a film festival in St. Albans on 24 March 2019.

She lives in Wroxham, Norfolk.

== Personal life ==
In her early life she was in a relationship with Irving Allen of Warwick Films.

She was married twice, first to Derren Nesbitt, then to Peter Blatchley.

== Select Credits ==
- High Flight (1957)
- Tank Force (1958)
- The Man Inside (1958)
- The Secret Man (1959)
- Idol on Parade (1959)
- The Bandit of Zhobe (1959)
- Killers of Kilimanjaro (1959)
- Jazz Boat (1960)
- Let's Get Married (1960)
- In the Nick (1960)
- The Hellions (1961)
