= Richard Maibaum =

American writer and film producer (1909–1991)

- Born: May 26, 1909; New York City, New York, U.S.
- Died: January 4, 1991 (aged 81); Los Angeles, California, U.S.
- Resting place: Hollywood Forever Cemetery
- Citizenship: United States
- Education: New York University; University of Iowa
- Occupations: Screenwriter, producer, playwright
- Notable work: James Bond films
- Spouse: Sylvia Maibaum

Richard Maibaum (May 26, 1909 – January 4, 1991) was an American screenwriter, film producer, and playwright, best known for his work on the James Bond films. He wrote 13 of the 16 Eon Productions Bond films produced between 1962 and 1989, beginning with Dr. No and ending with Licence to Kill.

== Early life and education ==
Maibaum was born to a Jewish family in New York City. He attended New York University. In 1930, he came to The University of Iowa's Speech and Dramatic Arts Department, where he studied under E.C. Mabie. He graduated Phi Beta Kappa in 1931, and in 1932 he received a master's degree, all the while writing plays and acting.

== Career ==
=== Broadway ===
He was 22 and still at the University of Iowa when his anti-lynching play, The Tree, became a 1932 Broadway production under the direction of the young Robert Rossen, later known for Body and Soul (1947) and a life destroyed by the Hollywood blacklist.

Back in New York after graduation, Maibaum spent 1933 as an actor in the Shakespearean Repertory Theater on Broadway. He appeared in fifteen different roles in many productions.

As a young playwright in the early 1930s in New York City, Maibaum was involved with the challenging politics of the Depression. In 1933, the year in which Hitler ascended to his dictatorial powers in Germany, Maibaum wrote the first openly anti-Nazi play on Broadway, Birthright, also directed by Rossen. This was the first of several anti-Nazi plays to appear that year.

Maibaum then wrote Sweet Mystery of Life (1935) a stage comedy which eventually became the film Gold Diggers of 1937 (1936). His rapid rise as a playwright soon earned him a contract as a writer for Metro-Goldwyn-Mayer, then the most powerful and prestigious studio in Hollywood.

While moving to LA and under contract to MGM, he wrote another play, See My Lawyer which was produced in New York by George Abbott and which starred Milton Berle. This was Maibaum's most successful play, running for 224 performances from 1939 to 1940.

=== MGM ===
Maibaum's first credit was The Old School Tie (1936) at MGM. He did They Gave Him a Gun (1937) which he worked on with Cyril Hume. They worked on Live, Love and Learn (1937) and The Bad Man of Brimstone (1937) and Stablemates (1938) for Wallace Beery.

=== Columbia ===
At Columbia he wrote The Lady and the Mob (1938), Coast Guard (1939), The Amazing Mr. Williams (1939).

Back at MGM he did The Ghost Comes Home (1940) and 20 Mule Team (1940) for Beery. He was one of many writers on Alfred Hitchcock's Foreign Correspondent (1940).

Maibaum went to Paramount where he worked on I Wanted Wings (1941), a huge hit. He did some uncredited work on Hold Back the Dawn (1941).

At 20th Century Fox he wrote Ten Gentlemen from West Point (1942).

=== World War Two ===
Maibaum joined the U.S. Army in 1942 and, like many other Hollywood writers and directors, was commissioned as a captain in the Signal Corps, During his four and one-half years in the army, he produced war morale films, assembled and disseminated combat film footage (presumably while stationed overseas) and supervised a documentary history of World War II, whose title, length, whereabouts, and, indeed, purpose, are currently unknown. He eventually achieved the rank of lieutenant colonel.

He contributed to the story for the Olsen-Johnson film See My Lawyer (1945).

=== Paramount ===
With this experience under his belt, Maibaum returned to Hollywood for a contract at Paramount as a producer and screenwriter.

He wrote and produced his first picture, O.S.S. (1946), which starred Alan Ladd in a fictional story of the newly formed Office of Strategic Services, the precursor to the CIA. This was the beginning of his fruitful association with Ladd.

Maibaum was producer on the John Farrow-directed The Big Clock (1948). He produced The Sainted Sisters (1948) with Veronica Lake, and Bride of Vengeance (1949) for director Mitchell Leisen.

He wrote and produced The Great Gatsby (1949) also with Alan Ladd and co-written with Yale-educated Cyril Hume. John Farrow, original director of the project, quit after a casting dispute with Maibaum and was replaced by Elliott Nugent.

Maibaum wrote and produced Song of Surrender (1949) for Leisen. He produced Dear Wife (1949), then did two more with Leisen: No Man of Her Own (1950) and Captain Carey, U.S.A. (1950) with Ladd.

=== Warwick Films ===
In the 1950s, American producers Irving Allen and Albert R. Broccoli were making action films in the UK under their Warwick Films banner. When Broccoli signed Ladd on for a three-picture deal for Warwick, Ladd insisted on Maibaum co-writing the screenplays.

Maibaum moved his family to England in order to do this. The first Warwick Film, The Red Beret (1953) was a bit hit. It was followed by Hell Below Zero (1954).

He also began writing for the new medium of television, including short teleplays for The Kate Smith Evening Hour, and the critically acclaimed Emmy nominated "Fearful Decision" starring Ralph Bellamy and Sam Levene which he also co-wrote with Cyril Hume for The United States Steel Hour.

Maibaum returned to The University of Iowa in 1954 for one semester to teach and supervise the "Footsteps of Freedom" project, a teleplay writing course. For Warwick, he worked on the war story, The Cockleshell Heroes (1955) which starred Jose Ferrer.

Maibaum returned to Hollywood in 1955. He and Hume adapted "Fearful Decision" for the big screen in Ransom! (1956) with Glenn Ford.

He co-wrote "Bigger Than Life," (1956) with Hume along with its star and producer, the British actor James Mason.

Maibaum did another for Warwick, Zarak (1956), directed by Terence Young and starring Victor Mature. He and Young collaborated on the script for Warwick's No Time to Die (1958) with Mature and he did some uncredited work on Warwick's The Man Inside (1959). He wrote some episodes of Wagon Train (1958) and provided the story for Warwick's The Bandit of Zhobe (1959) and Killers of Kilimanjaro (1959).

=== MGM TV ===
Maibaum became executive producer at M.G.M.-TV in 1958, for whom he wrote and produced the TV series The Thin Man (1957–59). He also produced a pilot for a TV series Maisie (1960), based on the film series, and worked on the script for The Day They Robbed the Bank of England (1960). His strong ties to the Writer's Guild and the writing profession led him to resign in 1960 during a writer's strike.

Maibaum wrote and produced a war film for 20th Century Fox starring Audie Murphy, Battle at Bloody Beach (1961). He then was invited by Albert Broccoli to write the first James Bond movie. And thus his future career was sealed.

=== James Bond ===
Maibaum was brought on to write the first Bond movie, Dr. No (1962), sharing credit with Johanna Harwood and Berkely Mather. He wrote the episode "The Medal" for Combat! (1963), then wrote From Russia with Love (1963), sharing credit with Harwood.

Maibaum worked on Goldfinger (1964), on which Paul Dehn also did work. He was one of several writers on Thunderball (1965).

You Only Live Twice (1967) was the first Bond film on which Maibaum was not credited as a writer, the producers using Roald Dahl. Albert Broccoli wanted to produce a non-Bond movie, Chitty Chitty Bang Bang (1968), and Maibaum did some work on the script.

Maibaum received sole script credit for On Her Majesty's Secret Service (1969), starring George Lazenby. He did an early draft of Diamonds Are Forever (1971), then the producers wanted an American writer and hired Tom Mankiewicz to rework it.

Mankiewicz was the sole screenwriter on Live and Let Die (1973), Roger Moore's first Bond movie. Instead, Maibaum wrote and produced a TV movie, Jarrett (1973), starring Glenn Ford.

Maibaum was brought back to the Bond movies to work on Mankiewicz's draft of The Man with the Golden Gun (1974). He was one of the many writers who worked on The Spy Who Loved Me (1977), sharing credit with Christopher Wood. Maibaum was not used on Moonraker (1979), the producers preferring Wood. Instead, Maibaum worked on a Bond spoof, S.H.E: Security Hazards Expert (1980).

Maibaum was brought back to work on the Bonds in association with Michael G. Wilson, Broccoli's step-son. Their first movie together was For Your Eyes Only (1981). It was followed by Octopussy (1983), on which George MacDonald Fraser also did a draft; A View to a Kill (1985), Moore's last Bond; The Living Daylights (1987), the first Bond from Timothy Dalton, whom Maibaum considered the best actor of the four Bonds; and Licence to Kill (1989).

Maibaum once told an interviewer that writing for Bond is "a case of Walter Mitty. I'm law-abiding and non-violent. My great kick comes from feeling that I'm a pro, that I know my job, and that I have enough experience that I can write a solid screenplay."

On writing the Bonds Maibaum said "The real trick of it is to find the villain's caper. Once you've got that, you're off to the races and the rest is fun." Maibaum is credited with adding the essential ingredient of humor to the James Bond films, an element lacking in the original Fleming novels.

== Death ==
Maibaum continued working on Bond films until the end of his life. He died on January 4, 1991, at the age of 81, survived by his wife, Sylvia (who died in 2006), two sons, Matthew and Paul, and a granddaughter, Shanna Claire.

His papers now reside at his alma mater, the University of Iowa.

== Partial filmography as screenwriter ==
- Birthright (1933)
- We Went to College (1936)
- Gold Diggers of 1937 (1937) -- story
- The Bad Man of Brimstone (1937)
- Live, Love and Learn (1937)
- They Gave Him a Gun (1937)
- Stablemates (1938)
- The Lady and the Mob (1939)
- Coast Guard (1939)
- The Amazing Mr. Williams (1939)
- 20 Mule Team (1940)
- The Ghost Comes Home (1940)
- I Wanted Wings (1941)
- Ten Gentlemen from West Point (1942)
- See My Lawyer (1945)
- O.S.S. (1946)
- The Great Gatsby (1949)
- The Red Beret (1953)
- Hell Below Zero (1954)
- The Cockleshell Heroes (1955)
- Bigger Than Life (1956)
- Zarak (1956)
- Ransom! (1956)
- No Time to Die (1957)
- Tank Force (1958)
- The Day They Robbed the Bank of England (1960) -- additional dialogue
- Killers of Kilimanjaro (1960)
- Chitty Chitty Bang Bang (1968) — additional dialogue
- S*H*E (1980)
- Ransom (1996) — story

=== James Bond films ===
- Dr. No (1962)
- From Russia with Love (1963)
- Goldfinger (1964)
- Thunderball (1965)
- On Her Majesty's Secret Service (1969)
- Diamonds Are Forever (1971)
- The Man with the Golden Gun (1974)
- The Spy Who Loved Me (1977)
- For Your Eyes Only (1981)
- Octopussy (1983)
- A View to a Kill (1985)
- The Living Daylights (1987)
- Licence to Kill (1989)

== Selected films as producer ==
- O.S.S. (1946)
- The Big Clock (1948)
- The Sainted Sisters (1948)
- Bride of Vengeance (1949)
- The Great Gatsby (1949)
- Song of Surrender (1949)
- Dear Wife (1949)
- No Man of Her Own (1950)
- Captain Carey, U.S.A. (1950)
- Battle at Bloody Beach (1961)

== Plays ==
- The Tree (1932)
- Birthright (1933)
- Sweet Mystery of Life (1935)
- See My Lawyer (1939)
- Middletown Mural
- A Moral Entertainment
- Tirade
- The Paradise Question

== Notes ==
- Goldberg, Lee (1983). "Richard Maibaum 007's Puppermaster". Starlog. p. 23.
- McGilligan, Patrick (1986). "Richard Maibaum: A Pretence of Seriousness". Backstory: Interviews with Screenwriters of Hollywood's Golden Age. University of California Press. p. 266–89.
