= The Desperados =

1969 film by Henry Levin

- Directed by: Henry Levin
- Screenplay by: Walter Brough
- Story by: Clarke Reynolds
- Produced by: Irving Allen
- Starring: Vince Edwards; Jack Palance
- Cinematography: Sam Leavitt
- Edited by: Geoffrey Foot
- Music by: David Whitaker
- Color process: Technicolor
- Production company: Meadway Productions
- Distributed by: Columbia Pictures
- Release date: April 30, 1969
- Running time: 90 minutes
- Country: United States
- Language: English

The Desperados is a 1969 American Western film directed by Henry Levin and starring Vince Edwards and Jack Palance.

== Plot ==
A ruthless preacher, Parson Josiah Galt, leads a band of Southern marauders during the Civil War that includes his sons, David, Adam and Jacob. The parson has turned vengeful and sadistic since the death of his wife.

David can no longer stomach what his family is doing. When his brother Adam tries to rape a girl in a Kansas town that the Galts have just raided and looted, David tries to leave. He is brought back, accused of "treason" by his own father and sentenced to hang.

Managing to escape, David returns to his wife Laura and son Pauly and relocates in Texas under a false name. They live peacefully there for six years and the war ends.

The robberies and killings by the Galts continue, however, and one day they turn up in the Texas town. A conscience-stricken David feels compelled to tell Sheriff Kirkpatrick who they are and who he really is. Then, in a confrontation, David kills his brother Adam.

Parson Galt and son Jacob exact revenge by taking Laura and Pauly captive and then kill David's wife. To get his son back, David learns of a train robbery his father has planned. He foils it and kills his brother Jacob. In a final showdown, Josiah and David fight and both fall to their death.

== Cast ==
- Vince Edwards as David Galt
- Sylvia Syms as Laura (his wife)
- Benjamin Edney as Pauly (his son)
- Jack Palance as Parson Josiah Galt
- Sheila Burrell as Emily Galt
- George Maharis as Jacob Galt
- Kate O'Mara as Adah (his girl)
- Christian Roberts as Adam Galt
- Kenneth Cope as Carlin
- Patrick Holt as Haller
- Christopher Malcolm as Gregg
- John Clark as Todd
- Neville Brand as Marshal Kilpatrick
- John Paul as Sheriff Lacey
- David Thomson as Deputy Tate (as David Thompson)
- Elliott Sullivan as Jennison

== Production ==
The film was produced by Irving Allen who made the Matt Helm films for Columbia in the late 1960s. Filming took place in Spain in April 1968 under the title The Marauders.

== See also ==
- List of American films of 1969
