= The Hellions =

1961 British film directed by Ken Annakin

- Directed by: Ken Annakin
- Written by: Harold Huth; Patrick Kirwan; Harold Swanton
- Based on: story by Harold Swanton
- Produced by: Harold Huth
- Starring: Richard Todd; Anne Aubrey; Jamie Uys; Marty Wilde; James Booth; Lionel Jeffries
- Cinematography: Ted Moore
- Edited by: Bert Rule
- Music by: Larry Adler
- Production companies: Irving Allen Productions; Jamie Uys Film Productions
- Distributed by: Columbia Pictures
- Release date: 2 November 1961 (London)
- Running time: 86 minutes
- Countries: United Kingdom; South Africa
- Language: English

The Hellions is a 1961 British Western film directed by Ken Annakin starring Richard Todd, Anne Aubrey, Lionel Jeffries, Ronald Fraser and Colin Blakely. It was written by Harold Huth, Patrick Kerwan and Harold Swanton, and set and filmed in South Africa.

== Plot ==
A lone law enforcement officer, Sam Hargis, battles criminals in South Africa when Luke Billings and his four sons ride into town to get revenge on Hargis for a previous clash, when he ran Luke out of town.

At first, the locals leave all of the fighting to Hargis, saying that it is his sole responsibility. However, after the Billings kill two innocent residents, some of them arm themselves and shoot dead all the Billings except Luke who, during a fist fight with Hargis, falls from a roof and is killed.

== Cast ==
- Richard Todd as Sam Hargis
- Anne Aubrey as Priss Dobbs
- Jamie Uys as Ernie Dobbs
- Marty Wilde as John Billings
- Lionel Jeffries as Luke Billings
- James Booth as Jubal Billings
- Al Mulock as Mark Billings
- Colin Blakely as Matthew Billings
- Zena Walker as Julie Hargis
- Ronald Fraser as Frank

== Production ==
In June 1960 Warwick announced it would not make films through major studios but would produce and distribute films itself with a slate of pictures worth $8 million a year: "three big films a year" plus eight others which it would finance through Eros (that would cost an estimated $3 million). Warwick's first new film would be The Long Ships, a $3.5 million spectacle, following by The Heillions. Both would be shot in Yugoslavia.

In May 1961, there were widespread reports that Albert R. Broccoli and Irving Allen would split up. Broccoli admitted that they disagreed on certain projects and that Allen would be making The Hellions by himself while Broccoli would make his own film in Africa but said that the men would reunite to make Cromwell.

The film was offered by Warwick Productions to Ken Annakin, who agreed to direct as he had fond memories of South Africa from another film, Nor the Moon by Night. He also had wanted to direct another Western, The Singer Not the Song but been unable to get the job. Anne Aubrey had appeared in a number of Warwick Films.

=== Shooting ===
Filming took place in Brits, a small town north of Pretoria. Annakin decided to make the film " as a spoof of the normal American Western. With many laughs and broad gags – such as were used so successfully years later in Cat Ballou. We proceeded to shoot the film this way." Annakin fell so ill with polio during the shoot he was unable to make it on set so Harold Huth and his assistant Clive Reed took over and directed under Annakin's instructions from the hospital bed. It took Annakin months to recover. Richard Todd recalled James Booth in particular was difficult for Huth. Nonetheless, Todd was excited by the possibilities of filming in South Africa and went on to make more films there.

== Reception ==
The Monthly Film Bulletin wrote: "Woefully unoriginal Western set in South Africa, unconvincingly staged and plotted, tediously violent, uncertainly directed by Ken Annakin and very badly acted."

The New York Times called it "High Noon on the veldt... wide screen drivel."

Annakin later wrote " Most of the critics panned the film for being uneven – which was not surprising since I had directed big portions of the scenes tongue-in-cheek while Harold Huth and Clive Reed, God bless them, had loyally tried to complete them but somehow had allowed everything to be played straight"

== Bibliography ==
- Annakin, Ken (2001). So you wanna be a director?. Tomahawk Press. ISBN 9780953192656.
