= In the Nick =

1960 British film by Ken Hughes

- Original British quad poster
- Directed by: Ken Hughes
- Screenplay by: Ken Hughes
- Based on: a story by Frank Norman
- Produced by: Harold Huth
- Starring: Anthony Newley; Anne Aubrey; Bernie Winters; James Booth
- Cinematography: Ted Moore
- Edited by: Geoffrey Foot
- Music by: Ron Goodwin; Lionel Bart (songs)
- Production company: Warwick Films
- Distributed by: Columbia Pictures
- Release date: 17 June 1960 (London)
- Running time: 109 minutes
- Country: United Kingdom
- Language: English

In the Nick is a 1960 British comedy film directed by Ken Hughes and starring Anthony Newley, Anne Aubrey, Bernie Winters, James Booth and Harry Andrews. It was written by Hughes based on a story by Frank Norman. A gang of incompetent criminals are placed in a special type of new prison.

== Plot ==
A progressive experimental prison without bars is run by young psychiatrist Dr. Newcombe and harsh but fair Chief Officer Williams. Four hardened criminals, the Spider Gang, arrive at this minimum security prison, the leader of whom is Spider Kelly. Dr. Newcombe has his work cut out trying to reform the boys and enlists the aid of Spider's girlfriend Doll, who, to Spider's anger, is now working as a stripper in Soho. Newcombe seems to be straightening Spider out, while Spider is in turn sorting out a rival imprisoned gang, led by Ted Ross), who hold the monopoly in smuggled cigarettes.

== Cast ==
- Anthony Newley as Dr. Newcombe
- Anne Aubrey as The Doll
- Bernie Winters as Jinx Shortbottom
- James Booth as Spider Kelly
- Harry Andrews as Chief Officer Williams
- Al Mulock as Dancer
- Derren Nesbitt as Mick
- Niall MacGinnis as Prison Governor
- Victor Brooks as Screw Smith
- Ian Hendry as Ted Ross
- Kynaston Reeves as Judge
- Barry Keegan as Screw Jenkins
- Diana Chesney as barmaid
- Andria Lawrence (uncredited)
- Sam Kydd as inmate

== Production ==
The film was based on a story by the writer of the novel Bang to Rights, Frank Norman. The film was described as a sequel to Jazz Boat (1960) and featured many of the same cast and crew.

Irwin Allen said in August 1959, while Jazz Boat ws still filming, that "after seeing the rushes for Jazz Boat it was quite apparent that we had on film a remarkable box office project and we decided immediately to put into action this sequel."

The featured song "Must Be" was written by Lionel Bart.

Filming took place starting 14 September 1959 with a week's location work and the rest of the movie shot at MGM's Boreham Wood studio. This resulted in Let's Get Married.

Warwick were reportedly so pleased with the film during filming it considered making a third film with the same team.

== Critical reception ==
The Monthly Film Bulletin noted: "A sequel to Jazz Boat, with the same leading characters and production team, In the Nick is cast very much in the same mould – easy-going mixture of farce and fantasy, loose and ingenuous scripting, excellent (if bizarre) team-playing. James Booth stands out for his genuinely observed portrait of Spider, Bernie Winters appears to be one of those rare comedians who can keep his moronic style of clowning free from offensiveness, and Niall MacGinnis (Governor), Harry Andrews (Chief Officer) and Ian Hendry (rival mobsters) all catch the eye. Anthony Newley is rather at sea as a psychiatrist, but plays with a likable modesty and warmth, and an improved Anne Aubrey discretely burlesques Jayne Mansfield. There is much in this film that is conventionally weak and structurally uneven, yet it gets closer to contemporary feeling than numerous more ambitious comedies. The dialogue, particularly, strikes an authentic note, and Ken Hughes' debt to Frank Norman, who wrote the original story, seems considerable."

Variety wrote: "In the Nick – British slang for in the cooler – suffers somewhat since it explores a joke only recently perpetrated successfully in Two Way Stretch. ... It lacks star value for the U.S., but U.K. audiences will find it an amusing enough diversion. Warwick has poured its small stock company into the pic and augmented it with some well-tried thesps. Ken Hughes' direction is straightforward and brisk. His screenplay, based on a story by Frank Norman, has the authenticity expected in view of the fact that Norman has become a lively, successful author after several years spent on and off in jails. The story lags towards the end but when it sticks to situation gags it is okay for yocks."

TV Guide noted, "Though there are some genuinely funny moments in the film, Newley is miscast as the compassionate psychologist. Though relatively straightforward for its first half, the plot becomes convoluted and the motivations are twisted in the second half."
