= Irving Allen =

American film producer (1905–1987)

- Born: November 24, 1905; Lemberg, Austria-Hungary
- Died: December 17, 1987 (aged 82); Encino, California, United States
- Resting place: Forest Lawn Memorial Park (Hollywood Hills)
- Occupation: Film producer
- Awards: Best Short Subject, Two-reel; 1947 Climbing the Matterhorn

Irving Allen (born Irving Applebaum; November 24, 1905 – December 17, 1987) was an Austro-Hungarian–born American theatrical and cinematic producer and director.

He received an Academy Award in 1948 for producing the short movie Climbing the Matterhorn. In the early 1950s, he formed Warwick Films with partner Albert "Cubby" Broccoli and relocated to England to leverage film making against a subsidy offered by the British government. Through the 1950s, they each became known as one of the best independent film producers of the day, as the two men would sometimes work in tandem, but more often than not on independent projects for their joint enterprise producing multiple projects in a given year.

== Biography ==
Born in Lemberg (Austro-Hungary), Allen entered the film industry as an editor at Universal, Paramount and Republic in 1929. During the 1940s, he made a sequence of shorts, including the Academy Award-nominated Forty Boys and a Song (1941), which he directed. His short films often won more acclaim than his low-budget features. He later said "for two years after that Oscar I was out of work. Then I decided there was no profit in being a genius."

In the late 1940s, Allen started concentrating more fully on being a producer.

=== Warwick Films ===
In the early 1950s, he led Warwick Films as the 'name producer', making films in both the US and England, with Albert R. Broccoli something of a junior partner. In 1957–1958, his partnership with Broccoli was strained both by Broccoli's family health crises (his second wife became terminally ill, soon after adopting one child and with a newborn) and to a lesser extent their disagreement over the film potential of the James Bond novel series. Broccoli was very interested, believing the novels could lead to a high quality series of films, and Allen was not, eschewing the potential of Broccoli's vision of Bond in favor of older established forms. The partners met with Bond author Ian Fleming separately in 1957, Cubby from New York where he'd retreated to care for his wife, but in the London meeting with Fleming arranged by Broccoli, Allen all but insulted Fleming, declaring that Fleming's novels weren't even "good enough for television". Broccoli mired in his troubles in New York, only knew that no deal had occurred until pre-production meetings with Fleming which resulted in the decision to make the Dr. No, as the first film project by Eon Productions.

In 1959, captivated by the historical importance and a good script Warwick undertook the risky project of producing, funding, and distributing The Trials of Oscar Wilde, which was released in 1960. Ahead of the times, its frank unprejudiced depiction of homosexual issues ran into a ratings stone wall in the United States all but preventing any sort of advertising, and the company lost its large investment, Broccoli and Allen fell out, and the partnership became moribund, being dissolved officially in a 1961 bankruptcy liquidation.

Thus the two partners each turned into solo producers in late 1960. Broccoli went on to found Danjaq, S.A. and Eon Productions with Harry Saltzman beginning the Bond films on a shoestring budget, and Allen occupied himself with other projects.

=== Other Allen Projects ===
Without Broccoli, Allen produced The Hellions (1961) in South Africa, and The Long Ships (1964) and Genghis Khan (1965) in Yugoslavia.

In 1965 he announced he would make Clive of India with director Terence Young but it was not made.

=== Matt Helm ===
Some years later, Allen cast about for his own spy series. He acquired the rights to Donald Hamilton's Matt Helm novels. Allen was responsible for the Matt Helm film series, The Silencers (1966), Murderers' Row (1966), The Ambushers (1967), and The Wrecking Crew (1969).

In July 1967, Allen said "At this stage I'm only interested in making money. I'm not interested in kudos or getting good reviews - I've had all that. I'm just concerned with getting the greatest number of people into theatres." "I've done practically everything," he said. "There's no place I haven't been in the business. The only thing I can't do is write."

Allen's Helm series had one major effect on Broccoli's Bond movies (produced at the time in partnership with Harry Saltzman). To get Dean Martin on board as Matt Helm, Allen had to make the actor a partner in the enterprise. Dean Martin ended up making more money on The Silencers (1966) than Sean Connery made on Thunderball (1965). This did not go unnoticed by Connery.

Other Allen films included The Desperados (1969).

Allen was buried at the Forest Lawn Memorial Park in Hollywood, California.

== Filmography ==
- Forty Boys and a Song (documentary, 1941) - director
- Avalanche (1946) - director
- Strange Voyage (1946) - director
- Climbing the Matterhorn (documentary, 1947) - director, producer
- High Conquest (1947) - director, producer
- 16 Fathoms Deep (1948) - director, producer
- Chase of Death (short, 1949) - director, producer
- The Man on the Eiffel Tower (1950) - uncredited director, producer
- Slaughter Trail (1951) - director, producer
- New Mexico (1951) - producer
- The Return of Gilbert& Sullivan (short, 1951) - director, producer
- The Red Beret (1953) - producer
- Hell Below Zero (1954) - producer
- The Black Knight (1954) - producer
- A Prize of Gold (1955) - executive producer
- The Cockleshell Heroes (1955)
- Safari (1956) - producer
- April in Portugal (1956) (short) - producer
- Odongo (1956) - executive producer
- Zarak (1956) - executive producer
- The Gamma People (1956) - executive producer
- Interpol/Pickup Alley (1957) - producer
- Fire Down Below (1957) - producer
- How to Murder a Rich Uncle (1957)
- The Long Haul (1957)
- High Flight (1957)
- A Day in Trinidad (short, 1957) - executive producer
- No Time to Die /Tank Force (1958) - producer
- The Man Inside (1958) - producer
- Idol on Parade (1959) - producer
- The Bandit of Zhobe (1959) - producer
- Killers of Kilimanjaro (1959) - producer
- Jazz Boat (1960) - executive producer
- The Trials of Oscar Wilde (1960) - executive producer
- In the Nick (1960) - executive producer
- Johnny Nobody (1961) - executive producer
- The Heillions (1961) - executive producer
- The Long Ships (1964) - producer
- Genghis Khan (1965) - producer
- The Silencers (1966) - producer
- Murderers' Row (1966) - producer
- The Ambushers (1967) - producer
- Hammerhead (1968) - producer
- The Wrecking Crew (1968) - producer
- The Desperados (1969) - producer
- Cromwell (1970) - producer
- Eyewitness (1970) - executive producer
- Matt Helm (TV series, 1975) - executive producer
