= The Bandit of Zhobe =

1959 British film by John Gilling

- Original British lobby card
- Directed by: John Gilling
- Screenplay by: John Gilling; Richard Maibaum
- Produced by: Irving Allen; Albert R. Broccoli
- Starring: Victor Mature; Anne Aubrey; Anthony Newley
- Cinematography: Ted Moore
- Edited by: Bert Rule
- Music by: Kenneth V. Jones
- Production company: Warwick Films
- Distributed by: Columbia Pictures
- Release date: 22 April 1959 (USA)
- Running time: 80 minutes
- Country: United Kingdom
- Language: English

The Bandit of Zhobe is a 1959 British CinemaScope adventure film directed by John Gilling and starring Victor Mature, Anne Aubrey and Anthony Newley. It was written by Gilling and Richard Maibaum. In British India a bandit goes on a rampage in the mistaken belief that the British have killed his family, which later proves to not be the case. It was produced by Albert Broccoli for Warwick Films and features extensive use of footage from Gilling's previous Zarak (1956).

== Plot ==
In late 1800's India, Kasem Khan, a bandit with a price on his head, is blind with revenge. He believes the British have massacred the population of his village, including his wife and child. But this is a myth perpetrated by Khan's native rival, Azhad. Only a British major's daughter, who pities Khan, can open his eyes to the truth.

== Cast ==
- Victor Mature as Kasim Khan
- Anne Aubrey as Zena Crowley
- Anthony Newley as Corporal Stokes
- Norman Wooland as Major Crowley
- Dermot Walsh as Captain Saunders
- Walter Gotell as Azhad
- Paul Stassino as Hatti
- Larry Taylor as Ahmed
- Murray Kash as Zecco
- Sean Kelly as Lieutenant Wylie
- Denis Shaw as Hussu
- Maya Koumani as Tamara

== Production ==
The film was known as The Bandit. Mature announced he would make it at the time he was appearing in No Time to Die.

Filming started 11 August 1958. It took place at Twickenham Studios and on location in Spain. Spanish location work took fifteen days.

In 1959 Warwick's Irving Allen said "You think I employ Victor Mature because I like that big lug? I employ him because he brings in the money and he isn't a genius boy."

== Critical reception ==
The Monthly Film Bulletin wrote: "Not for a moment to be taken seriously, this Robin Hood epic of the Indian North-West frontier has nevertheless been filmed, set and cast on a more lavish scale than the usual second feature. Most of the film depicts fighting, pillage, burning, capture, rescue, escape, and the action (much of it highly improbable) never flags. Anthony Newley as Stokes, Zena's soldier escort, provides welcome comic relief, going so far in places as to ridicule the main event and give the heartening impression that the direction is laughing at its own preposterous story. The tougher children should enjoy it."

Variety said "it cannot be taken seriously."

TV Guide wrote, "it's all chase and melodrama with little care for characterizations."

The Radio Times called it a "very silly Northwest Frontier romp, with Victor Mature in dark make-up as Kasim Khan ... romantic interest from forgotten starlet Anne Aubrey and some wince-inducing comic mugging from Anthony Newley. Quite a lot of money was thrown at it, but this remains a B-movie at heart."

Sky Movies called the film "a fiery 19th century adventure yarn that makes little sense but bulges with action that keeps coming at you."
