= Jazz Boat =

1960 British film by Ken Hughes

- British quad poster
- Directed by: Ken Hughes
- Written by: John Antrobus; Ken Hughes
- Based on: novel by Rex Rienits
- Produced by: Albert R. Broccoli; Harold Huth
- Starring: Anthony Newley; Anne Aubrey; Bernie Winters; James Booth
- Cinematography: Ted Moore; Nicolas Roeg
- Edited by: Geoffrey Foot
- Music by: Joe "Mr Piano" Henderson
- Production company: Warwick Films
- Distributed by: Columbia Pictures (UK); Columbia Pictures (US)
- Release date: February 1960
- Running time: 96 minutes
- Country: United Kingdom
- Language: English

Jazz Boat is a 1960 British black-and-white musical comedy film directed by Ken Hughes and starring Anthony Newley, Anne Aubrey, Lionel Jeffries and big band leader Ted Heath and his orchestra. It was written by John Antrobus and Hughes based on the 1960 novel Jazz Boat by Rex Rienits. The cinematographer was Nicolas Roeg.

Many of the cast and the same director also made In the Nick (1960) which was a sequel although Newley plays a different role.

== Plot ==
Electrician Bert Harris boasts that he is a successful cat burglar, which leads to his getting mixed up with real thieves who need those special skills for a big jewellery heist. However, Bert was only making a "song and dance" about being a cat burglar. He discovers that it is too late to back out.

== Cast ==
- Anthony Newley as Bert Harris
- Anne Aubrey as The Doll
- Bernie Winters as The Jinx
- James Booth as Spider Kelly
- Leo McKern as Inspector
- Lionel Jeffries as Sergeant Thompson
- David Lodge as Holy Mike
- Al Mulock as the dancer
- Joyce Blair as Rene
- Jean Philippe as Jean
- Liam Gaffney as Spider's father
- Henry Webb as barman
- Ted Heath as himself
- Frank Williams as man whose bowler hat is knocked off in the market

== Production ==
The book's author Rex Rienits later admitted that he disliked writing novels, but was in a career slump, so decided to write a novel to sell for cinematic rights.

Filming started 15 June 1959. A scene involving more than 200 extras was shot at Chislehurst Caves in Kent; on that night, the payroll was stolen, meaning they could not be paid. It was one of several low budget films from Warwick starring Anthony Newley.

== Critical reception ==
Variety called it "an odd assortment of romance, jazz, musical comedy and youthful crime is poured into Jazz Boat. ...What comes out is largely chaos although some of it is infectiously amusing. Mostly it is vague, disjointed and purposeless. Director Ken Hughes may have been making some sort of an attempt at parody of American crime pix."

The Monthly Film Bulletin wrote: "A juvenile crime story barely strong enough for a B-feature, with guitars smashed over skulls in place of wisecracks as its type of humour, is given a few largely irrelevant songs and a bizarre mixture of characters to become a lively, muddle-headed British musical. ... Anthony Newley's offhand way of jesting gets few chances from the script and, compared with the spirited caricaturing of David Lodge and Al Mulock in the gang, leaves him a most ineffectual hero. The general farce and fantasy mix uneasily with the violent episodes, the more brutal of them centred round a detective, who is not only churlish and quick-fisted in the latest film style but handy with a broken bottle as well."

TV Guide wrote, "While imitating American gangster films, this simple picture also provides a look at the British "Teddy Boy" subculture as some amusing situations, though none is particularly memorable."

Leonard Maltin called it an "Energetic caper."

Filmink said it "starts out as a crime drama then weirdly turns into a musical (complete with dance numbers) then back into a crime drama again."
