= Al Mulock =

Canadian actor (1926–1968)

- Mulock in Once Upon a Time in the West (1968).
- Born: Alfred Mulock Rogers; June 30, 1926; Toronto, Ontario, Canada
- Died: May 1968 (aged 41); Guadix, Granada, Spain
- Education: Actors Studio
- Occupation: Actor
- Years active: 1955–1968
- Spouse: Steffi Henderson (? – 1967; her death)
- Children: 1
- Relatives: Sir William Mulock (great grandfather)

Alfred Mulock Rogers (June 30, 1926 – May 1968), better known as Al Mulock or Al Mulloch, was a Canadian actor, director, and acting teacher. He trained at the Actors Studio and initially worked on the stage. After moving to England in the 1950s, he co-founded the London Studio, to teach method acting, and worked in film and television. He moved to Spain in 1966 and appeared in a number of spaghetti Westerns, including Once Upon a Time in the West, during the production of which he died by suicide.

== Early life ==
Alfred Mulock Rogers was born on June 30, 1926, in Toronto, Canada. He was the only child of Adèle Cawthra Mulock and Alfred Rogers. Maternally, he was descended from the wealthy Mulock family, headed by Sir William Mulock, the former Postmaster-General of Canada and Chief Justice of Ontario. Al Mulock trained at the Actors Studio in New York City.

== Career ==
During the late 1940s, Mulock co-owned the Red Barn Theatre in Jackson's Point, north of Toronto. He later moved to England and, with David de Keyser, founded The London Studio, which taught method acting to British actors. In 1957, he starred in a touring production of the play A Hatful of Rain (originally created as an Actors Studio exercise by Michael V. Gazzo), directed by Sam Wanamaker. He directed his own production at the Oxford Playhouse the following year.

He became active in the British film industry in the 1950s and early 1960s, making numerous appearances in television series and films, usually in small roles as an American or Canadian.

After appearing in 1966's Lost Command, Mulock moved to Spain, where he became known for his roles in spaghetti Westerns. He appeared in two Sergio Leone films, The Good, the Bad and the Ugly and Once Upon a Time in the West. In each film, his character is memorably shot: by Eli Wallach's character, Tuco, in the former and by Charles Bronson's character (in a shootout along with two others) in the opening scene of the latter.

== Personal life ==
He was married to actress Steffi Henderson; she died in 1967. They had one child named Robin Mulock, now named Eclipse Neilson, who is a screenwriter and artist. He was previously married to actress Catharine Ellison.

=== Death ===
In May 1968, Mulock died after jumping from his hotel in Guadix, Granada, Spain, during production of Once Upon a Time in the West. He was wearing his cowboy costume at the time of his fall. Mickey Knox, screenwriter for the film, and production manager Claudio Mancini witnessed Mulock's suicide as his body passed their hotel window near the end of the shoot. Mulock survived the fall, but suffered a pierced lung from a broken rib during the bumpy ride to the hospital. Before the ambulance left, director Sergio Leone shouted, "Get the costume, we need the costume."

In his memoir, Mickey Knox claimed that Mulock suffered from a drug addiction and became suicidal after being unable to find a fix.

== Selected filmography ==
- Joe MacBeth (1955) – First Assassin
- Wicked as They Come (1956) – Supporting Role (uncredited)
- Interpol (1957) – Interrogator
- Kill Me Tomorrow (1957) – Rod
- The One That Got Away (1957) – US Patrolman at Ogdensburg (uncredited)
- High Hell (1958) – Frank Davidson
- Death Over My Shoulder (1958) – Brainy Peterson
- Dial 999 (TV series) ('Commando Crook', episode) (1958) - Kendall
- The Sheriff of Fractured Jaw (1958) – Henchman (uncredited)
- Tarzan's Greatest Adventure (1959) – Dino
- Jazz Boat (1960) – The Dancer
- In the Nick (1960) – Dancer
- Tarzan the Magnificent (1960) – Martin Banton
- The Mark (1961) – Convict
- The Hellions (1961) – Mark Billings
- The Longest Day (1962) – Minor Role (uncredited)
- The Small World of Sammy Lee (1963) – Dealer
- Call Me Bwana (1963) – Second Henchman
- Game for Three Losers (Edgar Wallace Mysteries) (1965) – Nick
- Dr. Terror's House of Horrors (1965) – Detective (segment "Vampire")
- Lost Command (1966) – Mugnier
- The Good, the Bad and the Ugly (1966) – One-Armed Bounty Hunter
- Huyendo del halcón (1966) (released in 1973)
- The Hellbenders (1967) – The Beggar
- The Treasure of Makuba (1967) – Pat
- Battle Beneath the Earth (1967) – Sergeant Marvin Mulberry
- Reflections in a Golden Eye (1967) – Private (uncredited)
- Day of Anger (1967) – Wild Jack (uncredited in Italian version)
- Shoot Twice (1968)
- Once Upon a Time in the West (1968) – Knuckles, Member of Frank's Gang (uncredited) (released posthumously, final film role)
