= Climbing the Matterhorn =

1947 film

- Directed by: Irving Allen
- Cinematography: Richard Angst
- Release date: May 30, 1947
- Running time: 21 minutes
- Country: United States
- Language: English
- Budget: $685

Climbing the Matterhorn is a 1947 American short documentary film directed by Irving Allen. It won an Oscar at the 20th Academy Awards in 1948 for Best Short Subject (Two-Reel).

== See also ==
- Timeline of climbing the Matterhorn
