= Zarak =

- Original film poster
- Directed by: Terence Young
- Written by: Richard Maibaum
- Based on: The Story of Zarak Khan; 1949 novel by A. J. Bevan
- Produced by: Phil C. Samuel
- Starring: Victor Mature; Michael Wilding; Anita Ekberg
- Cinematography: Ted Moore; John Wilcox
- Edited by: Clarence Kolster
- Music by: William Alwyn
- Color process: Technicolor
- Production company: Warwick Productions
- Distributed by: Columbia Pictures
- Release dates: 26 December 1956 (New York City); January 1957 (United States); 10 January 1957 (London)
- Running time: 96 minutes
- Countries: United Kingdom; United States
- Language: English
- Box office: $1.4 million (US rentals)

Zarak is a 1956 CinemaScope adventure film directed by Terence Young with assistance from John Gilling and Yakima Canutt. Set in the Northwest Frontier of British India (though filmed in Morocco), the film stars Victor Mature, Michael Wilding and Anita Ekberg and features Patrick McGoohan in a supporting role. It was written by Richard Maibaum based on the 1949 book The Story of Zarak Khan by A.J. Bevan.

== Plot ==
Zarak Khan is the son of chief Haji who is caught embracing one of his father's wives, Salma. Zarak's father sentences both to torture and death but they are saved by The Mullah, an imam. The exiled Zarak becomes a bandit chief and an enemy of the British Empire.

== Cast ==
- Victor Mature as Zarak Khan
- Michael Wilding as Maj. Michael Ingram
- Anita Ekberg as Salma Khan
- Bonar Colleano as Biri Khan
- Eunice Gayson as Cathy Ingram
- Finlay Currie as The Mullah
- Peter Illing as Ahmad
- Bernard Miles as Hassu
- Eddie Byrne as Kasim Khan
- Patrick McGoohan as Moor Larkin
- Frederick Valk as Haji Khan
- André Morell as Maj. Atherton
- Harold Goodwin as Sgt. Higgins
- Alec Mango as Akbar
- Oscar Quitak as Youssuff
- Yana as Singer

== Development ==
The film is based on the 1950 book The Story of Zarak Khan written by A. J. Bevan. According to Bevan, the real Zarak Khan was an Afghan who spent most of his life fighting the British in the northwest frontier in the 1920s and 1930s. Among his crimes was the murder of a holy man. He eventually surrendered and was sentenced to life imprisonment in the Andaman Islands. However, when the Japanese occupied the islands, he remained in his cell.

Khan was eventually dealt a suspended sentence and worked for the British in Burma. In 1943, he was leading a patrol when its British officer was killed in an ambush. He watched another British patrol attacked by the Japanese and sent messengers to summon a Gurkha force. To stop the Japanese from escaping with their prisoners before the Gurkhas arrived, he attacked them singlehandedly and killed or wounded six soldiers before being overpowered. He refused to be beheaded and insisted on being flayed alive to buy time to enable the Gurkhas to arrive.

Warwick Films bought the film rights in 1953. Producer Irving Allen said he was more interested in the character of Zarak Khan than in the events described in the book. He was contemplating changing Khan's nationality in order to offer the role to Errol Flynn, but he eventually decided to make the film a fictional account set in the 19th century.

== Production ==
Filming begin Morocco on 1 November 1955 with Yakima Canutt in charge of the second unit. Victor Mature, under a two-picture deal with Warwick, joined the production on 19 November.

Ted Moore handled some of the Technicolor/CinemaScope photography for the film.

Stuntman Bob Simmons, who performed and doubled several stars in the film, noted that Mature refused to ride a horse. When his stunt double Jack Keely was killed in a horse accident on the set, Mature insisted on personally paying for his funeral.

Studio work took place at Elstree Studios.

== Soundtrack ==
Yana sings "Climb Up the Wall" (Auyar Hosseini/Norman Gimbel).

== Release ==
The original film poster was criticised by the House of Lords for "bordering on the obscene" and was banned in the United Kingdom.

== Reception ==
The Monthly Film Bulletin wrote: "Despite much location shooting in Spanish Morocco, the film's backgrounds contrive to appear almost as artificial as the cliché-ridden plot and dialogue (a weird mixture of pseudo-Oriental and Western-styled speech). Anita Ekberg's 'belly-dance' to the strains of 'Climb Up the Wall' provides the film's most bizarre moment."

Kine Weekly wrote: "The picture, probably the biggest bit of hokum ever to hit the screen, leaves nothing to chance and even less to the imagination. The British officer is always the gentleman, his wife remains perfectly cool in the hot climate, camels, as well as horses, figure in the many spectacular forays, hot-cha-cha harem sequences abound, a theme song accompanies much of its action, and, above – or below – all, religion creeps into the climax. As for the acting, Victor Mature displays tireless bravado as Zurah, Michael Wilding keeps a stiff upper lip in testing circumstances as the true-blue, though somewhat dim-witted, Ingram, Eunice Gayson is very South Kensington as Cathy and Anita Ekberg revels in striptease as Salma. The other well-known players, like most of the stars, perform with their tongues in their cheeks. The dialogue, definitely Boys' Own Paper, is appropriate, and the CinemaScope and Technicolor camera mobile. Great fun, whichever way you look at it; it's bound to hit the popular jackpot."

Picturegoer wrote: "This must be seen to be believed. It's my favourite awful film for years. Everyone involved in it should get an Oscar for absurdity. ... The tragedy is that there's actually a glimmer of fact in the story. But, for the most part, this drama's so funny that it makes up for all the bad British comedies of the past twelve months."

Picture Show wrote: "Colourful, exciting, spectacular film ... Photographed in colour, it is well acted by a cast who are difficult to recognise in make-up for their parts."

Variety wrote: "A lot of razzle-dazzle action with horsemen dashing across vast plains and deserts, and scant costuming to emphasize the voluptuous contours of Miss Ekberg are laid on thick, but still fail to veil the fact that the story by A. J. Bevan, scripted by Richard Maibaum, is strictly formula stuff, and quite old-fashioned. Terence Young's direction mostly emphasizes movement, with assists from associate directors Yakima Canutt and John Gilling in the mass chase footage, but still accounts for an unreasonable number of static scenes between the principals none of whom seems to have much feel for their characters. With virtually no character reality to portray, the three stars turn in the type of performances that are stock for such desert action plots. "

In The Radio Times Guide to Films Adrian Turner gave the film 2/5 stars, writing: "Victor Mature, in full Afghan mode, leads his gang of cut-throats against the might of the British army, headed by Michael Wilding, in a trashy adventure yarn set in the halcyon days of Empire. Apart from a belly dance by Anita Ekberg which should have earned the movie an X-rating it's notable only as one of producer 'Cubby' Broccoli's pre-Bond collaborations with director Terence Young, writer Richard Maibaum and cameraman Ted Moore."

Filmink called it "silly, colourful, entertaining" and one of Warwick's best films.

== Legacy ==
The action sequences reappeared in John Gilling's The Bandit of Zhobe (1958) and The Brigand of Kandahar (1965). The film was remade in India as Zarak Khan (1963), starring Paidi Jairaj and Chitra.

== See also ==
- List of American films of 1956
