= Albert R. Broccoli =

American film producer (1909–1996)

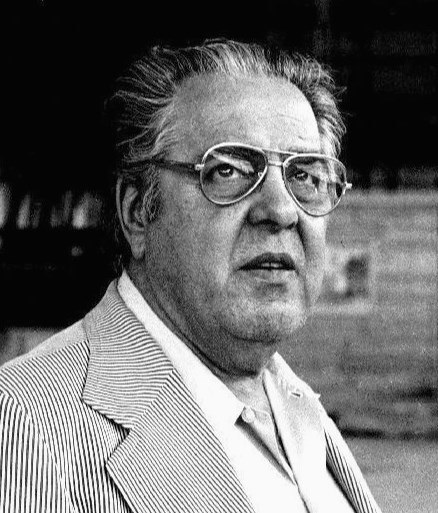
- Broccoli in 1976
- Born: Albert Romolo Broccoli; April 5, 1909; New York City, U.S.
- Died: June 27, 1996 (aged 87); Beverly Hills, California, U.S.
- Resting place: Forest Lawn Memorial Park, Hollywood Hills
- Other name: Cubby Broccoli
- Occupation: Film producer
- Years active: 1953–1996
- Notable work: James Bond film series
- Spouses: Gloria Blondell (m. 1940; div. 1945) Nedra Clark (m. 1951; died 1958) Dana Natol (m. 1959)
- Children: 3, including Barbara
- Relatives: Michael G. Wilson (stepson); David G. Wilson (step-grandson); Pat DiCicco (cousin)

Albert Romolo Broccoli (/ˈbrɒkəli/ BROK-əl-ee; April 5, 1909 – June 27, 1996), nicknamed "Cubby", was an American film producer who made more than 40 motion pictures throughout his career. Most of the films were made in the United Kingdom and often filmed at Pinewood Studios. Co-founder of Danjaq, LLC and Eon Productions, Broccoli is most notable as the producer of many of the James Bond films. He and Harry Saltzman saw the films develop from relatively low-budget origins to large-budget, high-grossing extravaganzas. Broccoli's heirs Barbara Broccoli and Michael G. Wilson continued to produce new Bond films until 2025 when the franchise rights were sold to Amazon.

== Early life and career ==
Broccoli was born in the borough of Queens, New York City, the younger of two children of immigrants from the Calabria region of Italy, Giovanni Broccoli and Kristina Vence. He had an older brother. Broccoli acquired his nickname after his cousin, film producer Pat DiCicco, began calling him "Kabibble", after a similarly named cartoon character. This was eventually shortened to "Kubbie" and adopted by Broccoli as "Cubby". The family later bought a farm in Smithtown, New York, on Long Island, near their relatives the DiCiccos.

The family moved to Florida; on the death of his father Giovanni, Broccoli moved to live with his grandmother in Astoria, Queens, in New York City. Having worked many jobs, including casket maker, Broccoli then became involved in the film industry. He started at the bottom, working as a gofer on Howard Hughes' The Outlaw (1941), which starred Jane Russell. Here he met his lifelong friend Howard Hughes for the first time, while Hughes was overseeing the movie's production after director Howard Hawks was fired. Broccoli rose quickly to the level of assistant director by the time the U.S. entered World War II.

He served in the US Navy during World War II from 1942 to 1947 where he met Ray Stark.

In 1951, he and Irving Allen created Warwick Films in order to take advantage of tax incentives available to them by producing films in the United Kingdom with British crews, while often using American stars. Among the films they produced are The Red Beret (1953), Hell Below Zero (1954), The Black Knight (1954), The Gamma People (1956), Safari (1956), Fire Down Below (1957), and The Trials of Oscar Wilde (1960), among others. The Allen–Broccoli partnership ended in part due to a disagreement over acquiring film rights to the James Bond novels as Allen felt they were of poor quality. Broccoli partnered instead with Harry Saltzman in 1961 to form Eon Productions, which would produce the Bond series. (See Production of the James Bond films)

=== Ted Healy incident ===
Broccoli is alleged to have been involved in an altercation with comedian and Three Stooges creator Ted Healy outside the Trocadero nightclub, just before the latter's death in 1937. A source alleged that actor Wallace Beery, Broccoli, and film producer Pat DiCicco beat Healy so badly that he fell into a coma and died. There is no documentation in contemporaneous news reports that either Beery or DiCicco was present, allegedly because the investigation and any subsequent newspaper coverage would be routinely sidelined by the MGM studio fixers, Eddie Mannix and Howard Strickling (Mannix would later become a producer and executive for MGM), since Wallace Beery was one of MGM's most highly-paid and important actors. Beery was immediately dispatched to a long vacation in Europe until the story died down. Broccoli admitted that he was indeed involved in a fist fight with Healy at the Trocadero. He later modified his story, stating that a heavily intoxicated Healy had picked a fight with him, the two had briefly scuffled, then shook hands and parted ways. In other reports, Broccoli admitted to pushing Healy, but not striking him.

There is disagreement over whether Healy died as a result of the brawl or due to his well-known alcoholism. Because of the authorities' lack of interest in investigating Healy's death, an autopsy was not performed until after Healy's body had been embalmed, rendering the examiner's note that Healy's organs were "soaked in alcohol" useless in determining a cause of death.

Following the autopsy, the Los Angeles county coroner reported that Healy died of acute toxic nephritis secondary to acute and chronic alcoholism. Police closed their investigation, as there was no indication in the report that his death was caused by physical assault.

== Personal life ==
Broccoli married three times. In 1940, at the age of 31, he married actress Gloria Blondell, the younger sister of Joan Blondell. They later divorced amicably in 1945 without having had children. In 1951, he married Nedra Clark, widow of the singer Buddy Clark. They adopted a son, Tony Broccoli, after which Nedra became pregnant. She died in 1958, soon after giving birth to their daughter, Tina.

In 1959, Broccoli married actress and novelist Dana Natol. They had a daughter, Barbara Broccoli, and Natol adopted his other two children. Albert Broccoli became a mentor to Dana's teenage son, Michael G. Wilson. The children grew up around the Bond film sets, and his wife's influence on various production decisions is alluded to in many informal accounts.

In 1966, Broccoli was in Japan with other producers scouting locations to film the next James Bond film You Only Live Twice. They all had tickets booked on BOAC Flight 911, but they cancelled their tickets on that day to see a ninja demonstration; Flight 911 crashed due to clear-air turbulence near Mount Fuji, killing everyone on board.

== Later life and honours ==
- In 1981, he was honored with the Irving G. Thalberg Memorial Award for his work in film. The award was presented at the 1982 Academy Awards ceremony by the then-current James Bond, Roger Moore. In 1990, Broccoli also has a star on the Hollywood Walk of Fame (as Cubby Broccoli).
- A thoroughbred horse racing enthusiast, Albert Broccoli owned Brocco, who won the 1993 Breeders' Cup Juvenile at Santa Anita Park at Arcadia, California.
- An autobiography was published posthumously in 1999, titled When the Snow Melts: The Autobiography of Cubby Broccoli (ISBN 978-0-7522-1162-6).
- The end of Tomorrow Never Dies (1997) displays the dedication "In loving memory of Albert R. (Cubby) Broccoli". The film was also the first to revise the opening credit – to "Albert R Broccoli's Eon Productions Limited presents" – thus ensuring his name remained in the opening credits of all subsequent Bond films up to and including No Time to Die (2021).
- The Albert and Dana Broccoli Theatre is one of three situated in the University of Southern California's School of Cinematic Arts Complex, completed in 2010.
- The Cubby Broccoli Cinema was opened in 1997, situated in the National Science and Media Museum, in Bradford, the first UNESCO City of Film.

== Death ==
Broccoli died at his home in Beverly Hills, California, in 1996 at the age of 87 of heart failure, having undergone a triple coronary artery bypass surgery earlier that year. He was interred in an ornate sarcophagus in the outdoor Courts of Remembrance section, at Forest Lawn – Hollywood Hills Cemetery in Los Angeles following a funeral mass at The Church of the Good Shepherd, Beverly Hills. Former Bond actor Timothy Dalton was among the pallbearers.

== Filmography ==
=== Producer with Irving Allen ===
- The Red Beret (1953)
- Hell Below Zero (1954)
- The Black Knight (1954)
- Safari (1956)
- Odongo (1956)
- Zarak (1957)
- Interpol (1957)
- Fire Down Below (1957)
- How to Murder a Rich Uncle (1957)
- High Flight (1957)
- No Time to Die (1958)
- The Man Inside (1958)
- Idol on Parade (1959)
- The Bandit of Zhobe (1959)
- The Trials of Oscar Wilde (1960)

=== Executive producer with Irving Allen ===
- A Prize of Gold (1955)
- Killers of Kilimanjaro (1959)

=== Producer with Phil C. Samuel ===
- The Cockleshell Heroes (1955)

=== Producer with Howard Huth ===
- Jazz Boat (1960)

=== Producer with Harry Saltzman ===
- Dr. No (1962)
- From Russia with Love (1963)
- Goldfinger (1964)
- You Only Live Twice (1967)
- On Her Majesty's Secret Service (1969)
- Diamonds are Forever (1971)
- Live and Let Die (1973)
- The Man with the Golden Gun (1974)

=== Executive producer with Harry Saltzman ===
- Thunderball (1965) (produced by Kevin McClory)

=== Producer (solo) ===
- Call Me Bwana (1963)
- Chitty Chitty Bang Bang (1968)
- The Spy Who Loved Me (1977)
- Moonraker (1979)
- For Your Eyes Only (1981)
- Octopussy (1983)

=== Producer with Michael G. Wilson ===
- A View to a Kill (1985)
- The Living Daylights (1987)
- Licence to Kill (1989)

=== Consulting producer ===
- GoldenEye (1995) (credited as presenter)

=== Cameos ===
- Fire Down Below (1957) – Drug smuggler
- Moonraker (1979) – Tourist in Venice with wife Dana Broccoli

== See also ==
- Ian Fleming
- James Bond (character)
