= Idol on Parade =

1959 British film by John Gilling

- Directed by: John Gilling
- Screenplay by: John Antrobus
- Based on: novel Idle on Parade by William Camp
- Produced by: Irving Allen; Albert R. Broccoli
- Starring: William Bendix; Anne Aubrey; Anthony Newley
- Cinematography: Ted Moore
- Edited by: Bert Rule
- Music by: Bill Shepherd
- Production company: Warwick Films
- Distributed by: Columbia Pictures
- Release date: 24 March 1959 (UK)
- Running time: 88 min.
- Country: United Kingdom
- Language: English

Idol on Parade (also known as Idle on Parade) is a 1959 British comedy film directed by John Gilling and starring William Bendix, Anthony Newley, Sid James and Lionel Jeffries. The screenplay was by John Antrobus, based on the 1958 William Camp novel Idle on Parade which was inspired by Elvis Presley's conscription into the US Army. It was produced by Irving Allen and Albert R. Broccoli for Warwick Films. Jeep Jackson serves his two years of compulsory National Service in the British military.

== Plot ==
Pop star Jeep Jackson is conscripted into the British army. He tries to continue his recording career while still undergoing training on camp. When a different J. Jackson materialises the platoon takes the opportunity to post Jeep to the Outer Hebrides to remove his disruptive impact from the camp.

When a group of soldiers go to the cinema in the film, they go to see The Cockleshell Heroes (1955), in which Newley was an actor.

== Cast ==
- William Bendix as Sergeant Major Lush
- Anthony Newley as Jeep Jackson
- Anne Aubrey as Caroline
- Lionel Jeffries as Bertie
- Sid James as Herbie
- David Lodge as Shorty
- Dilys Laye as Renee
- William Kendall as Commanding Officer
- Bernie Winters as Joseph Jackson
- Harry Fowler as Ron
- Percy Herbert as Sergeant (Hebrides)

== Production ==
The original novel, described by The Observer as "very funny", concerned an intellectual in the army, rather than a pop singer.

Anthony Newley had made several films for Warwick Productions but this was his first lead. Filming began on 10 November 1958 and took six weeks. It was the first time William Bendix had worked in England.

== Music ==
It was the first time Newley sang in a film. Four of the five songs from the soundtrack made the top 20, with "I've Waited So Long", reaching No. 3 in the UK chart. "I got a bigger kick out of being on the hit parade than anything I've ever done," said Newley.

== Critical reception ==
The Monthly Film Bulletin wrote: "The theme of a popular performer drafted into the Army strikes a topical note, but it is worked out here along the broadest and most predictable lines. Anthony Newley works hard against trite material, and apart from isolated bright moments the film is simply a waste of good comedy talent."

Variety called it "a straightforward army farce ... pure corn".

In British Sound Films: The Studio Years 1928–1959 David Quinlan rated the film as "average", writing: "Makeshift comedy has good pop songs (notably two by Gerry Laudan and Len Preverman) that helped make Newley a star."

Filmink caused it "surprisingly fun" and it let to several more low budget films starring Newley made by Warwick.
