= Let's Get Married (1960 film) =

British comedy drama by Peter Graham Scott

- Theatrical release poster
- Directed by: Peter Graham Scott
- Written by: Ken Taylor
- Based on: novel Confessions by Ken Taylor
- Produced by: John R. Sloan
- Starring: Anthony Newley; Anne Aubrey; Hermione Baddeley
- Cinematography: Ted Moore
- Edited by: Ernest Walter
- Music by: Edwin Astley
- Production company: Viceroy Films
- Distributed by: Eros Films
- Release date: 22 March 1960
- Running time: 91 minutes
- Country: United Kingdom
- Language: English

Let's Get Married is a 1960 British comedy drama film starring Anthony Newley, Anne Aubrey and Hermione Baddeley. It was written by Ken Taylor. The film features Newley singing the song "Do You Mind", which reached #1 in the British Hit Singles chart the same year.

Its director Peter Graham Scott said it was " not a good film – not my script and not my scene."

== Plot ==
Dickie Bird is a medical student. After being thrown out of his university he ends up working in a laundry and rebuilds his confidence with a relationship with a fashion model.

== Cast ==
- Anthony Newley as Dickie Bird
- Anne Aubrey as Anne Linton
- Bernie Winters as Bernie
- Hermione Baddeley as Mrs O'Grady
- James Booth as photographer
- Jack Gwillim as Doctor Saunders
- Lionel Jeffries as Marsh
- Diane Clare as Glad
- John Le Mesurier as Dean
- Victor Maddern as works manager
- Joyce Carey as Miss Finch
- Sydney Tafler as Pendle
- Betty Marsden as Miss Kaplan
- Cardew Robinson as salesman
- Meier Tzelniker as Schutzberger
- Nicholas Parsons as RAF officer
- Paul Whitsun-Jones as Uncle Herbert
- Margaret Tyzack as Staff Nurse

== Production ==
The film was based on a novel by Ken Taylor called Confessions about a single model who discovers she is pregnant. Warwick bought the rights and turned it into a musical comedy. It was one of several low budget films Warwick made with Anthony Newley and Anne Aubrey.

The film was shot at MGM British Studios in Elstree with sets designed by the art director Ken Adam. It was known as Confessions and made by Viceroy Films which had links to Warwick Films. Filming started 26 October 1959.

== Reception ==
Kine Weekly reported it "was doing extremely well" at the box office.

=== Critical reception ===
The Monthly Film Bulletin wrote: "After an amusing hospital scene, what might have been a charming, romantic little fable declines into slapstick and weak jokes. Some of the fooling displays imagination, but too often it is just a case of characters grimacing, falling, spraying each other with water – not to mention all manner of tasteless variations on the hardly uproarious theme of unmarried motherhood. Anthony Newley, giving a broader performance than usual, is given songs to sing, regardless of their relevance to the story. Lionel Jeffries provides yet another of his impressive caricatures. Like Newley, he awaits better material."

Variety wrote: "Neither Newley nor the rest of the cast can do much with the grim dialog and erratic situations. ... This corny setup blends uneasily with slapstick that is crashed home whenever the plot is sagging plus with two or three songs brought in extraneously and not very well put over. In fact, so many different styles have created a flat hodge-podge faced instead of the lighthearted lark that was obviously expected."
