= Warwick Films =

Former English film company

- Type: Film
- Founded: 1951
- Founder: Irving Allen, Albert R. Broccoli
- Defunct: 1962
- Headquarters: London, England, United Kingdom

Warwick Films was a film company founded by film producers Irving Allen and Albert R. Broccoli in London in 1951. The name was taken from the Warwick Hotel in New York City where Broccoli and his wife were staying at the time of the final negotiations for the company's creation. Their films were released by Columbia Pictures.

== Origins ==
The reason for the creation of Warwick Films was a combination of several economic factors in the 1950s.

- American film companies were forbidden by the Marshall Plan to take their film profits in the form of foreign exchange out of European countries.
- To use these profits in Britain, film companies would set up production companies using the required amount of British film technicians and actors to qualify as British productions in order to take advantage of the Eady Levy.
- At the same time Americans working outside the US for 510 days during a period of 18 months would not be taxed on their earnings by the Internal Revenue Service. Though this scheme was developed for the aid of American humanitarian workers redeveloping nations destroyed in World War II, agents discovered that Hollywood actors, directors and screenwriters would qualify for the tax break by working outside the US for the same period.
- Albert R. Broccoli, who wanted to become a producer, and Irving Allen, who had both produced and directed several films, discovered that they would have more creative freedom and control over their films by being based outside Hollywood.
- British labour and thespians were not only of high quality but also more economical to use than the conditions and salaries set by American film unions. Columbia Pictures agreed to match Allen and Broccoli's funding dollar for dollar; in other words for every dollar/pound the producers raised, Columbia would provide the same amount.

=== The Red Beret ===
In December 1951 it was announced the company's first film would be Wyoming Trail. It was not made.

Their first film based on a best selling book was The Red Beret (1953), based on Operation Biting. Originally Warwick arranged to do a two-picture deal with RKO, but that fell through and the company signed with Columbia.

Although the story was British, the producers decided to use an American star. Broccoli was a former agent who knew that Alan Ladd had left Paramount Pictures over monetary disputes. Ladd and Sue Carol, his agent and wife agreed to a three-picture contract with Warwick Films on condition that Ladd's personal screenwriter Richard Maibaum co-write the films.

The Red Beret was economically filmed with Parachute Regiment extras at their installations in England and Wales, under the direction of Terence Young. The film cost US$700,000 to make and grossed US$8 million worldwide leading to more Warwick films. (It also began a collaboration between Maibaum, Young and Broccoli that would lead to the James Bond films). According to Filmink the movie established the formula of subsequent Warwick Films - "a foreign (i.e. non-American) setting, imported American male star and British male-co star, a prominent female love interest, an action-adventure story based on some pre-existing IP (a novel, or historical event, or combination of both), a solid pro director, an American screenwriter, and American investment."

Warwick's next two movies both featured Alan Ladd and were in the action genre directed by Americans: Hell Below Zero, a whaling drama based on a script by Hammond Innes, directed by Mark Robson; The Black Knight (1954), a medieval swashbuckler directed by Tay Garnett. Both movies were a success and Columbia signed another three-picture contract with Warwick. Broccoli said in a 1954 interview:

We're not making British pictures, but American pictures in Britain. We're trying to Americanize the actors' speech in order to make the Englishman understood down in Texas and Oklahoma – in other words, break down a natural resistance and get our pictures out of the art houses and into the regular theatres. And we're doing it. Furthermore, we'll soon be shooting all over the world, bringing to the public the beauty and scope of the outdoors in new mediums – real backgrounds, but always with an American star.

At this stage, Warwick's budgets were around $1 million a film with $200,000 allocated to the American star.

== 1955–57 expansion ==
Warwick's next three films for Columbia were A Prize of Gold, The Cockleshell Heroes and Safari (1956). All followed the template of the first three films – action stories with American stars – with the additional element of being shot on location.

A Prize of Gold (1955) was a thriller starring Richard Widmark and directed by Mark Robson, partly shot in Berlin.

The Cockleshell Heroes (1955) was a war movie based on Operation Frankton filmed at RM establishments and in Portugal in 1955; the first British independent movie shot in CinemaScope, it starred Trevor Howard and José Ferrer, who also directed. It was the first screenwriting credit for Bryan Forbes. The movie was very popular in Britain but not in America.

Safari (1956) was set during the Mau Mau Rebellion, starring Victor Mature and Jennifer Leigh, directed by Terence Young. The movie was shot on location in Kenya. By this stage Columbia had agreed to finance additional movies from Warwick so it was decided to make Safari back to back with another adventure tale, Odongo (1956), starring MacDonald Carey and Rhonda Fleming, directed by John Gilling.

In 1956, Warwick negotiated producing nine films in three years for a cost of £6 million for Columbia Pictures. Warwick also arranged the shooting of several 30-minute films for television that would advertise Warwick's cinema releases.

Mature had signed a two-picture deal with Warwick. After Safari he made Zarak (1956), a British Empire tale shot in Morocco, directed by Terence Young with Michael Wilding and Anita Ekberg. The film was profitable. Warwick's first non-action film was a science fiction story, The Gamma People (1956), but it still starred an American (Paul Douglas) and was shot on location (Austria). It was the first Warwick film in black and white and its only science fiction story.

Warwick signed a new three-picture deal with Victor Mature. The first of this was Interpol (1957), an action thriller shot in Europe, which reunited Mature with Anita Ekberg, and co-starred Trevor Howard; John Gilling directed. Warwick's biggest budgeted movie to date was Fire Down Below (1957), an adventure film starring Rita Hayworth, Robert Mitchum and Jack Lemmon, directed by Robert Parrish. The shoot was difficult, being plagued by problems with its mercurial star Rita Hayworth, and led to a temporary strain in their relationship with Columbia Pictures.

At the end of 1956 it was announced Warwick would make thirteen films for a total of $18 million.

Warwick made its first comedy, the low budget How to Murder a Rich Uncle (1957), starring and directed by Nigel Patrick. It was their first movie without an American star.

High Flight (1957) was more traditional: an air force movie starring Ray Milland, directed by Gilling. So too was No Time to Die (1958) a war movie with Mature directed by Young. That was the last in a seven-picture deal Warwick had with Columbia.

In February 1957 Warwick announced their relationship with Columbia would finish at the end of the year. The financial performance of Fire Down Below and High Flight was disappointing, with Warwick losing money on both. In October 1957 Warwick announced they would shift from continuous production to a per-picture basis and let go many of their permanent staff. They said after No Time to Die they would have finished their seven film obligation to Columbia. Production on The Man Inside was pushed back. Warwick said Zarak was profitable but Fire Down Below grossed $750,000 short of the amount to break even.

In September 1957 it was announced that Ladd would make three more films for the company, but he did not appear in another Warwick film. Two of the films were made with other actors, The Man Inside and Killers of Kilimanjaro.

Towards the end of 1957 Warwick announced they were reducing production to one film a year. "In five years costs have doubled and earnings have halved", said Allen at the time. "When those two graphs meet you're out of business" Warwick sold its office business in central London, disposed of technical equipment and terminated staff contracts.

== 1958–61: Final years ==
In April 1958, while making No Time to Die. Broccoli announced “We have achieved what we set out to do. That was to cut out all unwanted overheads and top weight, so that we could engage personnel on a production to production basis. Today we are in a position to select carefully and make the pictures we want, We are not forced to make pictures because the organisation is set up, and the money is being spent anyway. The industry is cnanging he said we must change with it. We are proving that top features with top names can be made with economy."

In April 1959 Allen told the media:

I make films to appeal to the lowest common denominator. That's why I'm still in business while the arty-crafty boys are not. I don't want to make art and I don't want to make messages. I just want to make pictures that make money... Sure, I'd love to have critics write glowing reviews about my pictures. I'm human, I like praise - but I don't want it at the price of nobody going to see my pictures.

Warwick adjusted its output during its final years. They made three lower-budgeted musical comedies starring Anthony Newley: Idol on Parade (1959), directed by John Gilling; Jazz Boat (1960), directed by Ken Hughes; and In the Nick (1960), also directed by Hughes. Newley also had support roles in two more traditional Warwick movies: The Bandit of Zhobe (1959), starring Victor Mature, directed by Gilling, using footage from Zarak; and Killers of Kilimanjaro (1959) directed by Richard Thorpe, starring Robert Taylor. Many of these movies co starred Anne Aubrey who was under contract to Warwick as was Newlley. Aubrey was loaned out to appear in Carolina (1961).

In October 1959 Broccoli declared:

Though our production plans are as heavy as ever they were before, we are now making the pictures we want to make. Two or three years ago that wasn’t true. Our fixed overheads and commitments were so heavy we were being forced into making pictures we didn't really want. Like ‘The Gamma People.’ The machinery was set up, everything was paid for, it was just as cheap to make pictures as not to make them. Now we have broken down that cumbersome organisauion and engage personnel on a picture-to-picture basis we can take our time in settling up a production, and ensure that every detail is right before we start shooting.

=== Viceroy Films ===
Warwick formed another company, Viceroy Films, through which it made three films, Let's Get Married (originally called Confessions), The Trials of Oscar Wilde and Johnny Nobody.

Warwick's last film of note was The Trials of Oscar Wilde (1960) a biopic of Oscar Wilde directed by Hughes starring Peter Finch. The film was critically acclaimed but its financial failure contributed to the dissolution of Warwick.

=== James Bond ===
Allen and Broccoli had a disagreement about filming the James Bond series. Allen thought the project was beneath him. Broccoli was prevented from meeting Ian Fleming's representatives due to his wife's serious illness. Allen met them and showed much less than an enthusiasm for the Bond properties.

Still, Irving Allen and Albert R. Broccoli again renegotiated the rights to film Ian Fleming’s books. Warwick optioned three to be produced over a ten-year period, ‘Live and Let Die', ‘From Russia With Love’, the first being ‘Moonraker,’ given initial consideration towards treatment. The film was to be adapted from a script written by Fleming himself. This script was then re-written by Richard Maibaum. For the essential Bond casting the producers settled on Lithuanian-South African actor Laurence Harvey. After several disagreements with Columbia Pictures, Warwick attempted to become independent distributors by taking over Eros Films an established British film distributor. Eros distributed Johnny Nobody for Warwick . And then with one step Warwick shelved the Bond plans. Allen and Broccoli went their separate ways and Broccoli formed Eon Productions with Harry Saltzman to film the Bond series using many of the same crew from The Red Beret.

In 1962, Warwick Films announced they would make two films with Joan Littlewood but this did not transpire.

=== Eros Films and the end of Broccoli-Allen ===
In 1959 Warwick Films took over the distributor Eros Films.

In June 1960 Warwick announced it would not make films through major studios but would produce and distribute films itself with a slate of pictures worth $8 million a year: "three big films a year" plus eight others which it would finance through Eros (that would cost an estimated $3 million all up). Eros would distribute The Trials of Oscar Wilde in the UK and Warwick had just finished making Johnny Nobody. Warwick's first new film would be The Long Ships, a $3.5 million spectacle, following by The Heillions. Both would be shot in Yugoslavia.

In May 1961 Eros ran into financial difficulties, while distributing The Trials of Oscar Wilde and several staff were fired. Four films were awaiting distribution - Johnny Nobody, Middle of Nowhere, Carolina and Lies My Father Told Me. That month there were widespread reports that Broccoli and Allen would split up. Broccoli admitted that they disagreed on certain projects and that Allen would be making The Hellions by himself while Broccolli would make his own film in Africa but said that the men would reunite to make Cromwell.

(Years later Broccoli admitted "we decided to go into distributing, a side of the business we knew nothing about, and the result was a disaster.")

In June 1961 it was announced Broccoli had formed a partnership with Harry Salztman to produce films based on the James Bond novels. Warwick was still an active entity and Broccoli assured he would go back to Warwick.

In May 1962 Warwick still had the following films scheduled: The Long Ships, Fings Aren't What they Used to Be and No Drums, No Trumpets. Broccoli still had an interest in Warwick.

=== Allen Alone ===
The Long Ships would be made by Warwick but without Broccoli.

== Philosophy ==
Irving Allen once espoused his philosophy behind filmmaking to a journalist in 1959:

If somebody sends me a literate script do you know what I do with it? I throw it in the waste paper basket, that's what I do with it. I make films to appeal to the lowest common denominator. That's why I'm still in business while the other arty-farty boys are not. I just want to make pictures to make money. That is a rat race and you can't afford to be a rat in a rat race... If I'm not tough I'm going to have my brains eaten out. The art of surviving in this business is never to let on whether you've got fifty million bucks or fifty cents... I wouldn't see my own films. I've got more taste than that. Does Barbara Hutton buy her jewelry at Woolworths?

"We're not making British pictures but American pictures in Britain", said Broccoli.

== Warwick's people ==
The director of the initial Warwick Films was Terence Young who not only directed several more films for the company but acted as an uncredited story editor for Warwick. The Red Beret also used Ted Moore as a camera operator and Bob Simmons as a stuntman who both would work on more Warwick productions as stunt man, stunt double and stunt arranger.

Mark Robson directed several films for Warwick. John Gilling wrote and directed several Warwick films as did Ken Hughes.

As a condition of doing his final film The Black Knight with Warwick, Alan Ladd insisted on Warwick employing his friend Euan Lloyd who worked as a publicity agent for the company and directed the short April in Portugal (1954). Later, Warwick used Victor Mature, Bonar Colleano, Anne Aubrey and Anthony Newley in several films.

Other British film technicians getting their start at Warwick were future art director Syd Cain, story editor Peter Barnes and sound editor Alan Bell.

Harold Huth was a director of the company from 1956 onwards.

Filmink magazine argued:

Warwick Productions had an impressive legacy. It turned out a handful of solid action adventures (The Red Beret, Zarak Khan, No Time to Die), a surprisingly fun comedy (Idol on Parade), a lot of watchable mediocrity, and one masterpiece (Oscar Wilde). While the company imported many filmmakers from the US, it developed much local talent, notably Ken Hughes, John Gilling, Terence Young, Ted Moore, Anthony Newley, producer Euan Lloyd (who worked for them as a publicist), and Bryan Forbes. Most of all, it laid the groundwork for one of the defining film franchises of the 20th century.

== Films ==
- The Red Beret (1953)
- Hell Below Zero (1954)
- The Black Knight (1954)
- A Prize of Gold (1955)
- The Cockleshell Heroes (1955)
- Safari (1956)
- Odongo (1956)
- Zarak (1956)
- The Gamma People (1956)
- Interpol / Pickup Alley (1957)
- Fire Down Below (1957)
- How to Murder a Rich Uncle (1957)
- High Flight (1957)
- No Time to Die / Tank Force (1958)
- The Man Inside (1958)
- Idol on Parade (1959)
- The Bandit of Zhobe (1959)
- Killers of Kilimanjaro (1959)
- Let's Get Married (1960) (Viceroy Films)
- Jazz Boat (1960)
- The Trials of Oscar Wilde (1960) (Viceroy Films)
- In the Nick (1960)
- Johnny Nobody (1961) (Viceroy Films)
- The Long Ships (1963) (Avala Films)

== Unmade films ==
Projects announced by Warwick but subsequently not made include:

- An Englishman in Las Vegas – a comedy starring Norman Wisdom and Anita Ekberg
- The Rolls-Royce Story – a comedy starring Cary Grant
- The Death of Uncle George
- The Broad Arrow a version of Wards of the Outer March to be made in Australia
- Golden City
- The Naked Lady
- The Pistol based on novel by James Jones
- two films based on books by Terence Robertson - Ship with Two Captains, the story of the submarine Seraph, and Walker RN, a biopic of Captain Frederic John Walker
- Trooper Long by Tony Bevan about a disgraced officer in the 1880s and his rehabilitation
- The Long Ships – originally announced for Warwick but later made by Allen in 1964
- Trail of the Badman – a suspense Western with Don Burnett
- It's Always Four O'Clock – script by Irwin Shaw starring Alan Ladd
- The Unloved – written by Celin Morris
- a version of The Day of the Triffids by John Wyndham
- Cain and Abel
- Sammy by Ken Hughes
- No Drums, No Trumpets
- Force 136
