= The Man Inside (1958 film) =

1958 British film by John Gilling

- Directed by: John Gilling
- Written by: David Shaw; John Gilling; Richard Maibaum
- Based on: novel by M. E. Chaber
- Produced by: Irving Allen Albert R. Broccoli
- Starring: Jack Palance Anita Ekberg Nigel Patrick Anthony Newley Bonar Colleano
- Cinematography: Ted Moore
- Edited by: Bert Rule
- Music by: Richard Rodney Bennett
- Production company: Warwick Films
- Distributed by: Columbia Pictures
- Release dates: 7 September 1958 (UK); December 1958 (US)
- Running time: 90 minutes
- Country: United Kingdom
- Language: English
- Budget: $1,500,000

The Man Inside is a 1958 British crime adventure film directed by John Gilling and starring Jack Palance, Anita Ekberg, Nigel Patrick, Anthony Newley and Bonar Colleano. It was produced by Irving Allen and Albert R. Broccoli for Warwick Film Productions. The screenplay by David Shaw was based on the 1954 novel of the same name by M. E. Chaber. It was Colleano's final film role.

== Plot ==
Sam Carter is a jeweller's clerk who dreams of stealing a fortune in diamonds and eventually does so, but he kills a man in the process. He then embarks on the high life, but is pursued across Europe by private detective Milo March, a woman named Trudi Hall, and two thugs, Martin Lomer and Gerard Heinz. These characters end up trying to outwit each other over the largest diamond, which is worth $700,000, on a train travelling to London. March describes the diamond as "$700,000 of unhappiness" because people are willing to do anything to get it.

== Cast ==
- Jack Palance as Milo March
- Anita Ekberg as Trudie Hall
- Nigel Patrick as Sam Carter
- Anthony Newley as Ernesto Garcia
- Bonar Colleano as Martin Lomer
- Sean Kelly as Rizzio
- Sid James as Franklin
- Donald Pleasence as organgrinder
- Eric Pohlmann as Manuel Tristao
- Josephine Brown as Mrs Frazur
- Gerard Heinz as Robert Stone
- Alec Mango as Lopez
- Alfred Burke as Mr Pritchard
- Bill Shine as English husband
- Naomi Chance as Jane Leighton
- Walter Gotell as Profuno

== Production ==
Alan Ladd was originally announced to play the lead, and later it was announced that Victor Mature would play it.

In October 1957 filming for the project was pushed back from November 1957 to April 1958 in order to allow for Warwick's challenged cash flow following the box office disappointment of Fire Down Below [1957]. It was Anne Aubrey's third appearance in a Warwick production, following High Flight and No Time to Die.

"Action, fast-moving action, seems to be what the public wants at the moment," said producer Harold Huth. "Producers realise that why they keep going back to the war years, to present action sequences and characterisations they could hardly set in the present day."

The film was shot over seven weeks starting May 1957. It took place at Elstree Studios and on location in Spain near Madrid.

== Release ==
Nigel Patrick, Anne Aubrey and Anthony Newley made personal appearances to promote the film.

== Critical reception ==
Variety felt the film "could have been an absorbing psychological peak into the mind of a humble little man, vain as a peacock, who aspires to riches, power and the love of beautiful women. He is ready to rob and murder to satisfy his ambitions. But any such subtlety has been tossed away in favor of a routine cops-and-robbers chase yarn. As such, it has some suspense, some comedy and two or three capable performances. It offers brisk entertainment and its stellar appeal should make it a safe booking for all audiences."

The Monthly Film Bulletin wrote: "Virtually a carbon copy of the same director's Interpol [1957], this peripatetic thriller shares the previous film's faults, as well as its advantages. The picture's most notable feature is Nigel Patrick's edged performance."

Kinematograph Weekly wrote "The proceedings open in New York and, after visits to Lisbon, Madrid and Paris, spectacularly culminate on a London boat train. Its journey, although eventful, is padded out quite a bit, but Anita Ekberg’s ample and attractive upholstery definitely banishes fatigue. By and large, dyed-in-the-wool mass stuff."

The Radio Times Guide to Films gave the film 3/5 stars, writing: "This old-fashioned yarn has Nigel Patrick on the lam with a priceless diamond and Hollywood hunk Jack Palance as the private eye in hot pursuit. This dashes from one eye-catching European capital to the next, picking up the statuesque Anita Ekberg en route. With Anthony Newley as a Spanish cabbie, Donald Pleasence as an organ grinder and Sid James as a wideboy, the cast alone makes this worth watching, even if the plot is as old as the hills."

British film critic Leslie Halliwell said: "Fairly modest and unenterprising British thriller which hadn't much hope of the world market it was aiming at."
