= Anthony Newley =

English actor, singer, songwriter, and filmmaker (1931–1999)

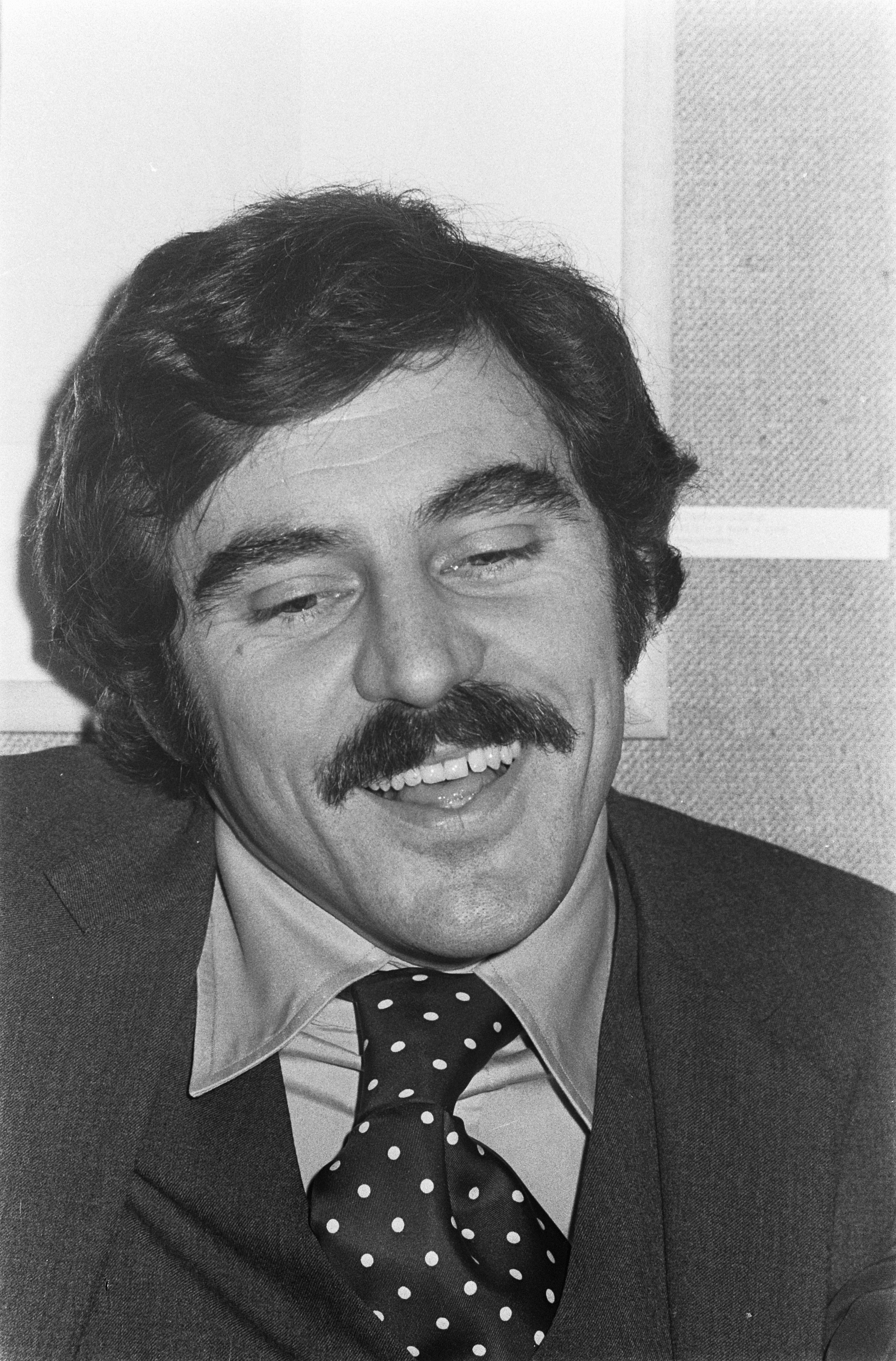
- Newley in 1967
- Born: Anthony Newley; 24 September 1931; Homerton, London, England
- Died: 14 April 1999 (aged 67); Jensen Beach, Florida, US
- Resting place: Forest Hills Memorial Park and Mausoleum, Florida, US
- Education: Italia Conti Academy of Theatre Arts
- Occupations: Actor; singer; songwriter; filmmaker
- Years active: 1947–1999
- Spouses: Ann Lynn (m. 1956; div. 1963) Joan Collins (m. 1963; div. 1971) Dareth Rich (m. 1971; div. 1989)
- Partner(s): Anneke Wills (1962–1963); Gina Fratini (1993–1999)
- Children: 6, including Tara and Alexander

Anthony Newley (24 September 1931 – 14 April 1999) was an English actor, director, comedian, singer, and composer. A "latter-day British Al Jolson", he achieved widespread success in song, and on stage and screen. "One of Broadway's greatest leading men", from 1959 to 1962 he scored a dozen entries on the UK Singles Chart, including two number one hits. Newley won the 1963 Grammy Award for Song of the Year for "What Kind of Fool Am I?", sung by Sammy Davis Jr., and wrote "Feeling Good", which became a signature hit for Nina Simone. His songs have been sung by a wide variety of singers including Fiona Apple, Tony Bennett, Barbra Streisand, Michael Bublé, and Mariah Carey.

With songwriting partner Leslie Bricusse, Newley was nominated for an Academy Award for the film score of Willy Wonka & the Chocolate Factory (1971), featuring "Pure Imagination", which has been recorded by dozens of singers. He collaborated with John Barry on the title song for the James Bond film Goldfinger (1964), sung by Shirley Bassey. An "icon of the early 1960s", his TV series The Strange World of Gurney Slade "continues to have a cult following due to its advanced postmodern premise that [he] is trapped inside a television programme."

Described by The Guinness Book of British Hit Singles & Albums as "among the most innovative UK acts of the early rock years before moving into musicals and cabaret", Newley was inducted into the Songwriters Hall of Fame in 1989.

== Early life ==
Newley was born on 24 September 1931 in the London district of Hackney to Frances Grace Newley and George Kirby, who were not married and separated soon after his birth. As "the son of a single mother, who waited on him hand and foot – even after he was married", Newley "mourned the absence of his real father, until, at 82, a jobbing builder made himself known." He was of Jewish descent through his maternal grandmother.

When his parents separated, his aunt and uncle brought him up through unofficial adoption. During the Second World War, he was evacuated to foster homes in the countryside, safe from the Blitz aerial bombing attacks on London. For a time, he stayed in Morecambe, Lancashire with George Pescud, a retired music hall performer whom he later credited with inspiring his freedom of self-expression.

Newley attended Clapton Park Lower School, now named Mandeville Primary School, which today recognises him as an alumnus with an official plaque. Although recognised as very bright by his teachers, by the age of fourteen he had left education and was working as an office boy for an advertising agency in Fleet Street called Hannaford and Goodman.

Prompted by an advertisement in The Daily Telegraph entitled "Boy Actors Urgently Wanted", he applied to the Italia Conti Stage School, only to discover that the fees were too high. Nevertheless, after a brief audition, he was offered a job as an office boy on a salary of 30 shillings a week plus tuition at the school. While serving tea one afternoon he caught the eye of producer Geoffrey de Barkus, who cast Newley as the title character in the children's film serial Dusty Bates (a.k.a. The Adventures of Dusty Bates, 1947).

== Career ==
=== Early career ===
Newley followed Dusty Bates with an appearance as Dick Bultitude in Peter Ustinov's Vice Versa (1948). One of the stars of the film was Kay Walsh, whose husband David Lean was about to direct a screen version of Oliver Twist. Walsh rang Lean and told him, "I've found your Artful Dodger".

During the 1950s, Newley made twenty-seven movies for J. Arthur Rank, many of them in the United States, "comfortably transitioning from child to adult actor". He was under contract for many years to Warwick Productions who built him into a star.

He also had to spend two years in the UK military in what was then called "national service".

During the decade, Newley appeared in many British radio programmes, including as Cyril in Floggits, which starred Elsie and Doris Waters, and also "became increasingly involved with the theatre."

=== Mainstream successes ===
Newley starred in the 1958 film No Time to Die (also known as Tank Force). The following year, "[a] turning point came with a literally star-making role in the low-budget musical film" Idol on Parade. Newley was cast as a rock singer called up for national service in a story which was somewhat inspired by Elvis Presley, who had recently been drafted for army service in the United States. The performance cemented Newley's position as a leading man. The film also launched his career as a pop singer, with the song "I've Waited So Long" – which featured in the soundtrack – reaching number 3 in the UK charts. This was quickly followed by his number 6 hit "Personality" and then two number 1 hits in early 1960: "Why" (originally a 1959 US hit for Frankie Avalon) and "Do You Mind?" (written by Lionel Bart). His 1961 version of the traditional "Pop Goes the Weasel" hit #12 on the UK charts.

=== TV work, music stardom ===
The ATV series The Strange World of Gurney Slade (1960) starred Newley, who was also its creator. A comedy series of six half-hour programmes, it develops from a premise established in the opening scene: Newley's character escapes from a television programme which is Gurney Slade itself. Now considered ahead of its time, the series was quickly moved from a peak-time slot.

His career as both a singer and a songwriter quickly went from strength to strength. In 1963, Newley won the Grammy Award for Song of the Year for having penned "What Kind of Fool Am I?" That year he also had a hit comedy album called Fool Britannia!, the result of improvisational satires of the British Profumo scandal of the time by a team of Newley, his then wife Joan Collins, and Peter Sellers. It peaked at number 10 in the UK Albums Chart in October 1963. Newley sang "Gonna Build a Mountain", "Once in a Lifetime", "On a Wonderful Day Like Today", "Who Can I Turn To?", "The Joker", and comic novelty songs such as "That Noise", and "The Oompa-Loompa Song." Newley also released a successful rendition of "Strawberry Fair", featuring his trademark cockney accent.

Among the many hit songs Newley wrote for others are "Goldfinger" (the title song of the James Bond film Goldfinger, music by John Barry) and "Feeling Good", which became a hit for Nina Simone and the rock band Muse, as well as a signature song for singer Michael Bublé. His songs have been recorded by artists as diverse as Harry Connick, Jr. and Mariah Carey. Some of the many ballads he wrote, usually with Leslie Bricusse, became signature hits for Sammy Davis Jr., Shirley Bassey and Tony Bennett. The two men referred to themselves as the team of "Brickman and Newburg", with "Newburg" concentrating mainly on the music and "Brickman" on the lyrics. Ian Fraser often devised their arrangements.

Despite the fact that such songs as "What Kind of Fool Am I?" and "The Candy Man" (a US number-one single for Sammy Davis Jr. and the Mike Curb Congregation in 1972) became international hits, Newley had less chart success in the United States as a recording artist, charting on the Billboard Hot 100 with four singles from 1960 to 1962, none reaching higher than number 67. However, he later had a number 12 hit on the Adult Contemporary charts in 1976 with "Teach the Children".

In 1967, Newley contacted renowned artist Cynthia Albritton, also known as Cynthia Plaster Caster, to see if she would like to cast him for her celebrity genitalia collection. Albritton was an admirer of Newley's Broadway plays. On June 7, 1967, she cast Newley in her Los Angeles apartment. Albritton's friend and fellow Newley fan Iva Turner was the 'plater' for the casting process. The cast is now part of Albritton's collection, which was acquired in 2023 by the Kinsey Institute.

=== Stage and screen ===
Throughout the 1960s, Newley enjoyed sustained success on London's West End theatre, on Broadway, in Hollywood films, and on British and American television. He and Bricusse also wrote musicals. Stop the World – I Want to Get Off, in which Newley also performed, earned him nomination for a Tony Award for Best Leading Actor in a Musical. A hit in London and on Broadway, it was made into a film version in 1966, in which Newley was unable to star owing to a schedule conflict. The other musicals for which he co-wrote music and lyrics with Bricusse included The Roar of the Greasepaint – The Smell of the Crowd (1965) and Willy Wonka & the Chocolate Factory (1971), based on the children's book by Roald Dahl.

Newley played Matthew Mugg in the original Doctor Dolittle (1967), a difficult experience in part because of the hostility he endured from the lead actor, Rex Harrison, and he also played the repressed English businessman opposite Sandy Dennis in the original Sweet November (1968). He hosted Lucille Ball's character on a whirlwind tour of London in Lucy in London (1966). He performed in the autobiographical, Fellini-esque and X-rated Can Heironymus Merkin Ever Forget Mercy Humppe and Find True Happiness? (1969), which he also directed and co-wrote with Herman Raucher. The film is "a surrealist sex-drenched disaster that could only ever have been made in the more free-wheeling Sixties", and starred his then-wife, Joan Collins, who said that his self-serving behaviour prompted her to get a divorce.

Newley also directed the 1971 film Summertree, starring Michael Douglas and Brenda Vaccaro. He appeared as Quilp in Mister Quilp (1975) (based on Dickens's The Old Curiosity Shop), for which he composed the songs (including 'Love Has the Longest Memory of All'). His last feature role, as Vince Watson in the cast of the long-running British TV soap opera EastEnders, was to have been a regular role, but Newley had to withdraw after a few months when his health began to fail.

Newley's contributions to Christmas music are highlighted by his rendition of the "Coventry Carol" which appears on many anthologies. He also wrote and recorded a novelty Christmas song called "Santa Claus is Elvis", and recorded an album of spoken poetry.

== Later life ==
In the early 1970s, Newley became a tax exile and went to live in Florida. He remained active throughout that decade, particularly as a Las Vegas and Catskills Borscht Belt resort performer, game show panelist (such as on Hollywood Squares) and talk show guest. Newley was "among the top five cabaret acts in America for some years", but gradually his career foundered. He took risks that eventually led to his downfall in Hollywood. Throughout the 1980s and 1990s, he worked to achieve a comeback. In the summer of 1983, Newley was the lead in Chaplin, a Broadway-bound musical he co-wrote with Stanley Ralph Ross, that never made it out of previews in Los Angeles. A planned Broadway opening was canceled after the production lost $4 million.

He briefly appeared on Late Night with David Letterman (when in town to be inducted into the Songwriters' Hall of Fame) to sing the theme to "Viewer Mail". He staged a successful American tour of his Stop The World – I Want To Get Off in 1986–87. The production co-starred a then unknown Suzie Plakson, whom Newley had discovered. The tour yielded her some strong notices and led to a steady career on stage and television. He was also featured as the Mad Hatter in Irwin Allen's all-star television adaptation of Alice in Wonderland (1985). That year he was diagnosed with cancer and had one kidney removed. Returning to England, he moved in with his mother Gracie in Esher, Surrey.

With his cancer arrested, he continued to work, appearing as a car dealer in the soap opera EastEnders and recording songs from Fiddler on the Roof and Scrooge. He enjoyed his final popular success onstage starring in the latter musical, which showed in London and toured British cities including Liverpool, Birmingham, Bristol and Manchester, in the 1990s. In 1996, Newley "made a rare nightclub appearance in New York at Rainbow and Stars, where the emotive force of his singing was undiminished". He summed up the previous two decades in remarks from the stage: "I went to Vegas for 22 years, married some absolutely charming women and gave them all my money. That's why I'm here."

At the time of his death, Newley had been working on a musical of Shakespeare's Richard III. He died of renal cancer at the age of 67, soon after he had become a grandfather.

In recognition of his creative skills and body of work, Newley was elected to the Songwriters Hall of Fame in 1989.

== Personal life ==
Newley was married three times. His first marriage was to Ann Lynn from 1956 to 1963 with whom he had one son, Simon, who died in infancy from a congenital infirmity.

Newley began a relationship with actress Anneke Wills in 1962 when she was 17 and working with him on the TV series The Strange World of Gurney Slade. In an interview, she recalled moving in with Newley, and listening to The Goons together. Unbeknown to Wills, Newley was still legally married to his first wife; Wills fell pregnant and Newley instructed her to have an abortion. Wills became pregnant a second time and gave birth to a daughter, Polly in 1963. By the time of Polly’s birth, Newley and Wills had separated after Wills discovered Newley was having an affair with Joan Collins. Newley did not want anything to do with Polly, and after Newley and Wills separated, Polly was brought up by Wills and her new partner, and later husband, Michael Gough, who legally adopted her. Polly died in a car accident in 1982 at the age of 19, always believing that Gough was her biological father.

Although separated, Newley then divorced Lynn and in 1963, he married Collins. The couple had two children, Tara Newley and Alexander (Sacha) Newley. They separated in 1969 after Collins discovered that Newley had embarked on numerous affairs throughout their marriage, and they divorced in 1971.

Newley’s third marriage was to former air hostess Dareth Newley Dunn (née Rich) from 1971 until their divorce in 1989, with whom he also had a daughter and son.

From 1993 until his death, Newley was in a relationship with fashion designer Gina Fratini; the pair had known each other since the 1950s when they had an affair whilst they were both married to other people.

With the help of a detective, Newley searched for and found his father, George Kirby. His mother then "began a correspondence with her long lost love." Newley flew him out to Los Angeles and bought them a house, where they lived until George died.

== Death and legacy ==
Newley died on 14 April 1999, in Jensen Beach, Florida, from renal cancer at the age of 67. He had first been diagnosed with cancer in 1985, and it returned in 1997 and spread to his lungs and liver. He was said to have died in the arms of his companion, the designer Gina Fratini.

=== Books, recordings tributes ===
Newley's life is the subject of a biography by Garth Bardsley called Stop the World (London: Oberon, 2003). 2013 saw the publication of Dear Tony, a book about a long-lasting friendship with a young American woman with whom he fell in love.

Amongst the many compilations of his recordings are Anthony Newley: The Decca Years (1959–1964), Once in a Lifetime: The Anthony Newley Collection (1960–71), and Anthony Newley's Greatest Hits (Deram). In May 2010, Stage Door Records released a compilation of unreleased Newley recordings entitled Newley Discovered. Produced with the Anthony Newley Society and Newley's family, the album contains the concept recordings for Newley's self-penned film musicals Can Heironymus Merkin Ever Forget Mercy Humppe and Find True Happiness?, Willy Wonka & the Chocolate Factory and Mr. Quilp.

Pure Imagination: The World of Anthony Newley and Leslie Bricusse, devised and directed by Bruce Kimmel, opened at the Pacific Resident Theatre in Venice, California, on 7 December 2013.

=== David Bowie ===
Newley was an early influence on musician David Bowie, who was a fan of his. The producer of Bowie's first album, Mike Vernon, described his first impression of Bowie as "a young Anthony Newley". Rolling Stone noted that Bowie's singing on the album was "delivered in an overenunciating voice that was deeply indebted to popular English actor-singer Anthony Newley." Regarding the influence, Newley himself stated in 1992: "I always made fun of it, in a sense. Most of my records ended in a stupid giggle, trying to tell people that I wasn't being serious. I think Bowie liked that irreverent thing, and his delivery was very similar to mine, that Cockney thing."

== Discography ==
=== Albums ===
==== Studio albums ====
| Date | Title | Label | Cat. No. | UK | Format |
|---|---|---|---|---|---|
| May 1960 | Love Is a Now and Then Thing | UK: Decca; US: London | LK4343; LL3156 | 19 | LP |
| July 1961 | Tony | UK: Decca; US: London | LK4406; PS244 | | LP |
| 1964 | In My Solitude | UK: Decca; US: RCA Victor | LK4600; LSP-2925 | | LP |
| 1965 | Who Can I Turn To? | RCA Victor | UK: 7737; US: 3347 | | LP |
| 1966 | Newley Recorded | RCA Victor | UK: 7873; US: 3614 | | LP |
| 1967 | Anthony Newley Sings the Songs from Doctor Dolittle | RCA Victor | LSP-3839 | | LP |
| Jan 1971 | For You | Bell Records | 1101 | | LP |
| 1971 | Pure Imagination | MGM | SE4781 | | LP |
| 1972 | Ain't It Funny | MGM/Verve | MV5096 | | LP, 8T |
| Dec 1977 | The Singer and His Songs | United Artists | LA718-G | | LP, 8T |
| 1992 | Too Much Woman | KD's; GNP/Crescendo | BBI CD; 2243 | | CD |
| 2012 | The Last Song – The Final Recordings | Stage Door | STAGE 9031 | | CD |

==== Compilation albums ====
| Date | Title | Label | Cat. No. | Format | Note |
|---|---|---|---|---|---|
| 1962 | This Is Tony Newley | London | LL362 | LP | |
| 1963 | Peak Performances | London | LL3283 | LP | |
| Dec 1964 | Newley Delivered | Decca | LK4654 | LP | |
| 1966 | The Genius of Anthony Newley | London | PS361 | LP | |
| Nov 1967 | "Who Can I Turn To" and Other Songs from "The Roar of the Greasepaint" + Sings the Songs from "Doctor Doolittle" | RCA Victor | TP3 5033 | Reel | 2 albums on 1 reel |
| 1969 | The Best of Anthony Newley | RCA Victor | LSP4163 | LP | |
| Oct 1969 | The Romantic World of Anthony Newley | Decca | SPA45 | LP | |
| 1985 | Mr Personality | Decca | Tab 84 | LP | |
| 1990 | Anthony Newley's Greatest Hits | Deram | 820 694 | CD | |
| 1996 | The Very Best of Anthony Newley | Carlton | 30364 00122 | CD | |
| 1997 | The Very Best of Anthony Newley | Spectrum Music | 552 090–2 | CD | |
| 1997 | Once in a Lifetime: The Collection | Razor & Tie | RE 2145–2 | CD | |
| 2000 | On a Wonderful Day Like Today: The Anthony Newley Collection | BMG Camden | 74321 752592 | CD | |
| 2000 | Decca Years 1959–1964 | Decca | 466 918–2 | CD | 2-CD set |
| 2001 | Best of Anthony Newley | Decca | 882 964 2 | CD | |
| 2004 | Love Is a Now and Then Thing / In My Solitude | Vocalion | CDLK 4206 | CD | 2 albums on 1 CD |
| 2004 | Pure Imagination + Ain't It Funny | Edsel | DIAB 8059 | CD | 2 albums on 1 CD |
| 2006 | Anthony Newley Collection | Universal/Spectrum | 983 796-3 | CD | 2-CD set |
| 2006 | Newley Delivered / Tony | Dutton Vocalion | CDLK 4327 | CD | 2 albums on 1 CD |
| 2007 | Best of Anthony Newley | Sony | 88697066002 | CD | |
| 2010 | Newley Discovered | Stage Door Records | STAGE 9022 | CD | |
| 2014 | Newley Recorded & Who Can I Turn To? | Vocalion | CDLK 4515 | CD | 2 albums on 1 CD |
| 2015 | Sings "The Good Old Bad Old Days" | Stage Door Records | STAGE 9038 | CD | |

- 1990 Greatest Hits Decca
- 1995 The Best of Anthony Newley (GNP Crescendo)
- 2002 What Kind of Fool Am I? (Armoury)
- 2002 Remembering Anthony Newley: The Music, the Life, the Legend (Prism Leisure)
- 2003 Stop the World! (Blitz)
- 2005 The Magic of Anthony Newley (Kala)
- 2006 Anthology (Universal/Spectrum)
- 2007 Best of Anthony Newley (Camden)

=== Singles ===
| Date | A-Side | B-Side | Record Label | Cat. No. | Peak chart positions | | | Album |
| Date | A-Side | B-Side | Record Label | Cat. No. | UK | US | US AC | Album |
|---|---|---|---|---|---|---|---|---|
| Apr 1959 | "I've Waited So Long" | "Sat'day Night Rock-a-Boogie" | UK: Decca; US: London | UK: F11127; US: 1871 | 3 | | | Non-album Single |
| May 1959 | "Idle on Parade" | "Idle Rock-A-Boogie" | Decca | F11137 | | | | Non-album Single |
| Jun 1959 | "Personality" | "My Blue Angel" | Decca | F11142 | 6 | | | Non-album Single |
| Sep 1959 | "Someone to Love" | "It's All Over" | Decca | F11163 | | | | Non-album Single |
| Jan 1960 | "Why" | "Anything You Wanna Do" | Decca | F11194 | 1 | | | Non-album Single |
| Mar 1960 | "Do You Mind?" | "Girls Were Made to Love And Kiss" | UK: Decca; US: London | UK: F11220; US: 1918 | 1 | 91 | | Non-album Single |
| Jul 1960 | "If She Should Come to You" | "Lifetime of Happiness" | UK: Decca; US: London | UK: F11254; US: 1929 | 4 | 67 | | Non-album Single |
| Nov 1960 | "Strawberry Fair" | "A Boy Without a Girl" | Decca | F11295 | 3 | | | Non-album Single |
| Mar 1961 | "And the Heavens Cried" | "Lonely Boy and Pretty Girl" | Decca | F11331 | 6 | | | Non-album Single |
| Jun 1961 | "Pop Goes the Weasel" | "Bee Bom" | Decca | F11362 | 12 | | | Tony |
| Oct 1961 | "Pop Goes the Weasel" | "Gone With the Wind" | London | 9501 | | 85 | | Tony |
| Jul 1961 | "What Kind of Fool Am I?" | "Once in a Lifetime" | Decca | F11376 | 36 | | | Stop The World - I Want To Get Off |
| Jul 1962 | "What Kind of Fool Am I" | "Gonna Build A Mountain" | London Records | 45-LON 9546 | | 85 | | Stop The World - I Want To Get Off |
| Jan 1962 | "D-Darling" | "I'll Walk Beside You" | Decca | F11419 | 25 | | | Non-album Single |
| Feb 1962 | "Yes! We Have No Bananas" | "When Your Lover Has Gone" | London Records | 45-9512 | | | | Non-album Single |
| Apr 1962 | "Why" | "What Now My Love" | London Records | 45-LON 9518 | | | | Non-album Single |
| Jun 1962 | "Deep River" | "Letters To My Love" | London Records | 45-9531 | | | | Non-album Single |
| Jul 1962 | "That Noise" | "The Little Golden Clown" | Decca | F11486 | 34 | | | Non-album Single |
| Apr 1963 | "There's No Such Thing As Love" | "She's Just Another Girl" | Decca | F11636 | | | | Non-album Single |
| Oct 1963 | "I Saw Her Standing There" | "I Love Everything About You" | London Records | XAM 5202 | | | | Non-album Single |
| Nov 1963 | "The Father of Girls" | "I Love Everything About You" | Decca | F11767 | | | | Non-album Single |
| Jan 1964 | "Tribute" | "Lament to a Hero" | Decca | F11818 | | | | Non-album Single |
| Jan 1964 | "Young Only Yesterday" | "The Father Of Girls" | London Records | 45-LON XAM 5205-V | | | | Non-album Promo Single |
| Apr 1964 | "Solitude" | "I'll Teach You How to Cry" | Decca | F11883 | | | | In My Solitude |
| Nov 1964 | "Who Can I Turn To (When Nobody Needs Me)" | "The Joker" | RCA Victor | 47-8485 | | | | Who Can I Turn To And Other Songs From "The Roar Of The Greasepaint" |
| Mar 1966 | "Why Can't You Try to Didgeridoo" | "Is There a Way Back to Your Arms" | RCA Victor | RCA 1518; US: RCA 47-8785 | | | | Non-album Single |
| Sep 1967 | "Something in Your Smile" | "I Think I Like You" | RCA Victor | RCA1637 | | | | Anthony Newley Sings The Songs From Doctor Dolittle |
| Feb 1968 | "Sweet November" | "Sara's Theme" (Michael Legrand) | Warner Bros. Records | 7174 | | | | Non-album Single |
| Jun 1969 | "I'm All I Need" | "When You Gotta Go" | MCA Records | MU 1061 | | | | Can Heironymus Merkin Ever Forget Mercy Humppe and Find True Happiness |
| 1969 | "Chalk And Cheese" | — | Duchess Music Corp. | UD-101 | | | | Non-album Demo Single |
| May 1971 | "The Candy Man" | "Pure Imagination" | MGM Records | K-14252 | | | | Pure Imagination |
| Jan 1971 | "(Where Do I Begin) Love Story" | "(Where Do I Begin) Love Story" | MGM Records | K14220 | | | | Non-album Promo Single |
| Sep 1972 | "The Good Old Bad Old Days" | "Mister Sniffles" | Columbia | DB 8933 | | | | Ain't It Funny |
| Jun 1974 | "Long Live Love" | "Long Live Love" | MGM Records | M 14724 | | | | Non-album Promo Single |
| 1976 | "Teach the Children" | "Shelby" | United Artists | UA-XW825-Y | | | 12 | The Singer And His Songs |
| 1977 | "Hollywood Seven" | "Lunch With A Friend" | United Artists | UA-XW1012 | | | | Non-album Single |

- 1966 "Moogies Bloogies" (recorded with Delia Derbyshire) [unreleased demo]

=== EPs ===
| Date | Title | A-side | B-side | Record label | Cat. No. | UK | Album |
|---|---|---|---|---|---|---|---|
| Mar 1959 | Idle on Parade | 1 – "I've Waited So Long"; 2 – "Idle Rock-a-boogie" | 1 – "Idle on Parade"; 2 – "Sat'day Night Rock-a-Boogie" | Decca | DFE6566 | 13 | Non-album EPs |
| Feb 1960 | Tony's Hits | 1 – "Why"; 2 – "Anything You Wanna Do" | 1 – "Personality"; 2 – "My Blue Angel" | Decca | DFE6629 | | Non-album EPs |
| Aug 1960 | More Hits from Tony | 1 – "If She Should Come to You"; 2 – "Girls Were Made to Love and Kiss" | 1 – "Do You Mind"; 2 – "Lifetime of Happiness" | Decca | DFE6655 | | Non-album EPs |
| 1960 | | 1 – "C'es Pour Toi"; 2 – "Basin Street Blues" | 1 – "La Montagne"; 2 – "Petite Reine" | Decca | 450 976 | | Non-album EPs |
| Oct 1961 | This Time the Dream's on Me | 1 – "Gone with the Wind"; 2 – "This Time the Dream's on Me" | 1 – "It's the Talk of the Town"; 2 – "What's the Good About Goodbye?" | Decca | DFE6687 | | Love Is A Now And Then Thing |
| Sep 1963 | Fool Britannia – Volume One | 1 – "Whatever Happened To John & Martia" (Joan Collins, Peter Sellers, + Tony Newley); 2 – "Vice - Italian Style" (Peter Sellers + Dan Massey); 3 – "We Are Not Amused" (Peter Sellers + Dan Massey) | 1 – "There's No Business Like No Business" (Tony Newley, Peter Sellers, Joan Collins, + Mike Lipton); 2 – "Two Old Ladies Locked In Conversation" (Peter Sellers + Tony Newley) | Ember Records | EMB E.P 4530 | | Fool Britannia |
| Sep 1963 | More Fool Britannia | 1 – "There Goes That Song Again" (Leslie Bricusse + Tony Newley); 2 – "The Secret Service" (Peter Sellers + Tony Newley) | 1 – "Countess Interruptus" (Joan Collins + Peter Sellers); 2 – "The House That Mac Built" (Peter Sellers, Tony Newley + Leslie Bricusse) | Ember Records | EMB E.P. 4531 | | Fool Britannia |
| Dec 1970 | | 1 – "You And Me-Inevitable"; 2 – "I Am A Fool" | 1 – "Will The Windows Continue To Mock Me"; 2 – "Memoria" | Bell Records | 957-EP | | For You |

=== Recordings of musicals ===
| Date | Title | Type | Role | Label | Cat. No. | Format |
|---|---|---|---|---|---|---|
| Sep 1955 | Cranks | Original London Cast Album | performer | HMV | CLP1082 | LP |
| Aug 1961 | Stop the World I Want to Get Off! | Original Broadway Cast Album | writer and performer | London | 8001 | LP, Reel |
| Mar 1965 | The Roar of the Greasepaint, the Smell of the Crowd | Original Broadway Cast Album | writer and performer | RCA Victor | 1109 | LP, Reel |
| 1966 | Stop the World I Want to Get Off! | Film Musical Soundtrack | writer | Warner Bros | 1643 | LP, Reel |
| Dec 1967 | Doctor Dolittle | Original Film Musical Soundtrack | performer | Stateside | 10214 | LP, 8T, Reel |
| May 1969 | Can Heironymus Merkin Ever Forget Mercy Humppe and Find True Happiness | Original Film Musical Soundtrack | writer and performer | Kapp | KRS-5509 | LP, 8T, Reel |
| Jul 1971 | Willy Wonka and the Chocolate Factory | Original Film Musical Soundtrack | writer | Paramount | 6012 | LP, 8T |
| 1972 | The Good Old Bad Old Days | Original London Cast Album | writer and performer | EMI | EMA 751, 1E 064 ◦ 05258 | LP, 8T |
| 1974 | Mr. Quilp | Original Film Musical Soundtrack | writer and performer | | CHAP-12574 | LP |
| 1978 | The Travelling Music Show | Original London Cast Album | writer and performer | CBS | CBS70156 | LP, CC |
| 1994 | Scrooge | Original London Cast Recording | performer | TER | MUS C N26 | CD, CC |
| 1995 | Music And Songs From Fiddler On The Roof | | performer | Castle Pulse | PLS CD 569 | CD |

== Theatre ==
- Cranks (26 November 1956 – 29 December 1956) – Bijou Theatre (performer)
- Stop the World – I Want to Get Off (3 October 1962 – 7 September 1963) – Shubert Theatre / (9 September 1963 – 1 February 1964) Ambassador Theatre (music & lyrics, book, director, performer)
- The Roar of the Greasepaint – The Smell of the Crowd (16 May 1965 – 4 December 1965) – Shubert Theatre (music & lyrics, book, director, performer)
- Anthony Newley / Henry Mancini (31 October 1974 – 10 November 1974) – Uris Theatre (performer)
- Chaplin (12 August 1983 – 24 September 1983) – Dorothy Chandler Pavilion, Los Angeles (performer)
- Charlie and the Chocolate Factory (23 April 2017 – 14 January 2018) – Lunt-Fontanne Theatre (music & lyrics songs from the motion picture)

== Filmography ==
- Henry V (1944) as Boy in English Camp (uncredited)
- Dusty Bates (1947) as Dusty Bates
- The Little Ballerina (1948) as Johnny
- Vice Versa (1948) as Dick Bultitude/Paul Bultitude
- Oliver Twist (1948) as the Artful Dodger
- The Guinea Pig (1948) as Miles Minor
- Vote for Huggett (1949) as Dudley
- A Boy, a Girl and a Bike (1949) as Charlie Ritchie
- Don't Ever Leave Me (1949) as Jimmy Knowles
- Madeleine (1950) as Chemist's Assistant (uncredited)
- Highly Dangerous (1950) as Operator (uncredited)
- Top of the Form (1953) as Percy
- Those People Next Door (1953) as Bob Twigg
- Up to His Neck (1954) as Tommy
- Above Us the Waves (1955) as Engineer, X2
- The Blue Peter (1955) as Fred Starling
- The Cockleshell Heroes (1955) as Marine Clarke
- Port Afrique (1956) as Pedro
- The Last Man to Hang (1956) as Cyril Gaskin
- The Battle of the River Plate (1956) as Radio Operator, Tairoa, Prisoner on Graf Spee (uncredited)
- X the Unknown (1956) as LCpl. 'Spider' Webb
- The Good Companions (1957) as Mulbrau
- Fire Down Below (1957) as Miguel
- How to Murder a Rich Uncle (1957) as Edward
- High Flight (1957) as Roger Endicott
- No Time to Die (1958) as Noakes
- The Man Inside (1958) as Ernesto
- The Lady Is a Square (1959) as Freddy
- Idol on Parade (1959) as Jeep Jackson
- The Bandit of Zhobe (1959) as Cpl. Stokes
- The Heart of a Man (1959) as Johnnie
- Killers of Kilimanjaro (1959) as Hooky Hook
- Jazz Boat (1960) as Bert Harris
- Let's Get Married (1960) as Dickie Bird
- In the Nick (1960) as Dr. Newcombe
- The Small World of Sammy Lee (1963) as Sammy 'Lee' Leeman
- Doctor Dolittle (1967) as Matthew Mugg
- Sweet November (1968) as Charlie Blake
- Can Heironymus Merkin Ever Forget Mercy Humppe and Find True Happiness? (1969) as Hieronymus Merkin
- Summertree (director, 1971)
- It Seemed Like a Good Idea at the Time (1975) as Sweeney
- The Old Curiosity Shop (1975) as Daniel Quilp
- Alice in Wonderland (1985) as The Mad Hatter
- Stagecoach (1986) as Trevor Peacock
- The Garbage Pail Kids Movie (1987) as Captain Manzini
- Coins in the Fountain (1990) as Alfred
- Polly Comin' Home (Made for TV, 1990) as Dabney Mayhew
- Boris and Natasha: The Movie (1992) as Sal Manelli
- Gone to Seed (1992) as DI Keet

== Awards and nominations ==
| Year | Award | Category | Work | Result |
|---|---|---|---|---|
| 1963 | Grammy Awards | Song of the Year | "What Kind of Fool Am I?" | Won |
| 1963 | Grammy Awards | Best Solo Vocal Performance, Male | "What Kind of Fool Am I?" | Nominated |
| 1963 | Grammy Awards | Best Original Cast Show Album | Stop the World – I Want to Get Off | Nominated |
| 1963 | Tony Awards | Best Author (Musical) | Stop the World – I Want to Get Off | Nominated |
| 1963 | Tony Awards | Best Original Score | Stop the World – I Want to Get Off | Nominated |
| 1963 | Tony Awards | Best Performance by a Leading Actor in a Musical | Stop the World – I Want to Get Off | Nominated |
| 1965 | Tony Awards | Best Original Score | The Roar of the Greasepaint – The Smell of the Crowd | Nominated |
| 1965 | Tony Awards | Best Direction of a Musical | The Roar of the Greasepaint – The Smell of the Crowd | Nominated |
| 1965 | Theatre World Award | Best Original Score | The Roar of the Greasepaint – The Smell of the Crowd | Nominated |
| 1965 | Grammy Awards | Song of the Year | "Who Can I Turn To?" | Nominated |
| 1970 | Writers' Guild of Great Britain | Best British Original Screenplay | Can Heironymus Merkin Ever Forget Mercy Humppe and Find True Happiness? | Won |
| 1972 | Academy Awards | Best Scoring: Adaptation and Original Song Score | Willy Wonka & the Chocolate Factory | Nominated |
