= Odongo =

- Original film poster
- Directed by: John Gilling
- Screenplay by: John Gilling; Islin Auster (story)
- Produced by: Max Varnel
- Starring: Rhonda Fleming; Juma; Macdonald Carey; Earl Cameron
- Cinematography: Ted Moore
- Music by: George Melachrino
- Production company: Warwick Films
- Distributed by: Columbia Pictures
- Release date: November 1956 (US)
- Running time: 85 minutes
- Country: United Kingdom
- Language: English
- Budget: £121,093

Odongo (also known as Odongo Adventure on the African Frontier) is a 1956 British African adventure CinemaScope drama film directed by John Gilling and starring Rhonda Fleming, Macdonald Carey and Juma. It was written by Gilling from a story by Islin Auster and produced by Warwick Films It concerns a white hunter who falls in love with a vet in Kenya.

== Plot ==
Pamela, a veterinarian from Pittsburgh, comes to Kenya to work on big-game hunter Steve Stratton's farm. He was expecting a man and doesn't want her there.

The exotic animals Steve hunts and collects are precious to young native Odongo, who is employed by him. When another worker, Walla, is fired, he attacks Odongo, whose pet chimp comes to his rescue. Steve threatens to send the chimp to a zoo.

Odongo misses on purpose during a safari when Steve orders him to shoot an impala. Steve also saves Pam from a charging rhino and hopes she will leave. But his attitude softens after Pam delivers a native's baby and is given a rare animal as a reward.

The angry Walla frees all of the animals from their pens and starts a fire. Odongo is accused by Steve, then is taken hostage by Walla and pushed from a cliff into crocodile-filled waters. Steve jumps in to save him, while Walla fatally encounters one of Odongo's animals while trying to escape. Pamela agrees to stay.

== Cast ==
- Rhonda Fleming as Pamela Muir
- Macdonald Carey as Steve Stratton
- Juma as Odongo
- Eleanor Summerfield as Celia Watford
- Francis de Wolff as George Watford
- Leonard Sachs as Game Warden
- Earl Cameron as Hassan
- Dan Jackson as Walla
- Michael Caridia as Lester Watford
- Errol John as Mr Bawa
- Paul Hardtmuth as Mohammed
- Bartholomew Sketch as Leni
- Lionel Ngakane as Leni's brother

== Production ==
According to Filmink the movie was a slight departure from the typical product of Warwick Films being "a romance rather than an action movie."

== Reception ==
The Monthly Film Bulletin wrote: "Some good animal photography fails to compensate for the stereotyped story, the course of which can be predicted after the first ten minutes, Rhonda Fleming seems a very improbable veterinary surgeon, although she looks quite decorative. Juma, the young African player, has an engaging personality and apparently a way with animals."

Kine Weekly wrote: "The picture introduces all the old gimmicks – the heroine has many near squeaks and there is an inevitable stampede towards the finish – but realistic backgrounds and detail give the overall an exciting look. Juma acts with considerable power and feeling for one so young and is an entertainment in himself as Odongo, Rhonda Fleming makes a ravishing Pamela and Macdonald Carey smoothly registers as Steve. Eleanor Summerfield grossly exaggerates as the twittering Celia, but happily. Ugly Puss, the chimpanzee, does its stuff. And finally, a word for CinemaScope and Technicolor: they put essential gloss on unblushing Boys' Own Paper."

Variety wrote: "There is little new in this latest East African story, although the main events are set on an animal farm Instead of in a jungle. There is the dour white hunter, his faithful aides personified in the form of a youthful African, and the customary long shots of wild animal life, Hungry crocs, charging rhinos and trumpeting elephants provide the stereotyped hazards of the jungle. Besides Juma, the scene stealing colored boy, is a mischievous chimp, whose antics are surefire for laughs. The whole makes for good all-round entertainment, although supplying few novelty angles."
