= How to Murder a Rich Uncle =

- Directed by: Nigel Patrick
- Written by: John Paxton
- Based on: the play Il faut tuer Julie by Didier Daix
- Produced by: John Paxton
- Starring: Nigel Patrick; Wendy Hiller; Charles Coburn; Anthony Newley
- Music by: Kenneth V. Jones
- Production company: Warwick Films
- Distributed by: Columbia Pictures
- Release dates: June 1957 (United Kingdom); 25 October 1957 (New York City)
- Running time: 79 minutes
- Country: United Kingdom
- Language: English

How to Murder a Rich Uncle (also known as Uncle George) is a 1957 British black comedy film directed by Nigel Patrick and starring Patrick, Wendy Hiller, Charles Coburn and Anthony Newley. It was written by John Paxton based on the play Il faut tuer Julie by Didier Daix.

== Plot ==
The film's story follows a man who plans to murder his wealthy Uncle George.

== Cast ==
- Nigel Patrick as Henry
- Charles Coburn as Uncle George
- Wendy Hiller as Edith Clitterburn
- Katie Johnson as Alice
- Anthony Newley as Edward
- Athene Seyler as Grannie
- Kenneth Fortescue as Albert
- Paddy Webster as Constance
- Michael Caine as Gilrony
- Trevor Reid as Inspector Harris
- Cyril Luckham as coroner
- Johnson Bayly as radio officer
- Martin Boddey as Police Sergeant
- Kevin Stoney as bar steward
- Anthony Shaw as colonial
- Ian Wilson as postman

== Production ==
It was Patrick's first film as director although he had directed for the stage. He hade made Prize of Gold for Warwick and mentioned that he wished to direct. He was offered the chance to act and direct while making Raintree County in Hollywood. He returned to do some location work in late December 1956 then did a week's rehearsal starting 1 January 1957. Filmink called it " the first time the company made either a comedy or a film without an American star."

== Reception ==
The Monthly Film Bulletin wrote: "For successful comédie noire, the handling must be as direct and unrelenting as the material. It is sad that the promise of the initial situation of this film is never allowed to mature fully – mostly owing to Nigel Patrick's rather hesitant direction. Nevertheless some of the comedy has a splendid vigour, even if it remains intermittent. "There are two particularly spirited performances by the lamented Katie Johnson and by Athene Seyler; the spectacle of the latter wolfing her breakfast cereal without milk is very funny indeed."

Kine Weekly wrote: "The picture, not unlike Kind Hearts and Coronets, neatly parodies life in an English upper middle class family while engaged in wholesale murder, logically introduces a note of irony and ends in showmanlike fashion with a question mark. Nigel Patrick cleverly steers the middle course between the serious and the ridiculous as the scheming, unabashed Henry, Charles Coburn has his moments as Uncle George, Wendy Hiller, Katie Johnson and Athene Seyler are just right as Edith, Aunt Alice and Grannie, and Anthony Newley scores fluently as the inquisitive Edward. The detail is particularly good, and the same goes for the dialogue. And lastly a word of praise for the censor for giving the crepe-covered rib-tickler a U certificate."

Variety wrote: "Comic aspects of the idea are richly fulfilled, the film also being a spoof on British nobility and their refusal to enter trade even as a last resort. Patrick, who also directs for subtle effect, creates a lasting impression as the stuffy and somewhat ingenious nobleman fully convinced he can get away with his plan of murder. It's his picture, rather than Coburn's, in for a good piece of work but in a more conventional role. A highly capable cast supports, headed by Wendy Hiller as Patrick's absent-minded spouse, one of the victims."

In The Radio Times Guide to Films Adrian Turner gave the film 3/5 stars, writing: "Glorious memories of Kind Hearts and Coronets are occasionally stirred by this black comedy about the English aristocracy. Nigel Patrick who also directed with an uncredited Max Varnel stars as Sir Henry Clitterburn, down on his uppers, who plots to murder visiting Canadian uncle Charles Coburn in order to inherit a bundle. His plans go awry, of course. There's lots to enjoy here, including a lovely gallery of English eccentrics and, making his second credited screen appearance, Michael Caine."

Leslie Halliwell wrote "Feebly handled black comedy which does not come off at all despite a highly talented cast."
