= Geoffrey Foot (film editor) =

British film editor

Geoffrey Macadam Foot (19 May 1915 – 9 September 2010) was a British film editor. He was born in Putney and began his career with Ealing Studios. Foot was a co-founder of the Guild of British Film and Television Editors.

== Selected filmography ==
- The Passionate Friends (1949)
- Madeleine (1950)
- The Galloping Major (1951)
- The Sound Barrier (1952)
- Rob Roy, the Highland Rogue (1953)
- Trouble in Store (1953)
- Fortune Is a Woman (1957)
- Blue Murder at St Trinian's (1957)
- The Trials of Oscar Wilde (1960)
- The Long Ships (1964)
- Genghis Khan (1965)
- Death Line (1972)
- The Watcher in the Woods (1980)
