= Richard Eyer =

American former child actor

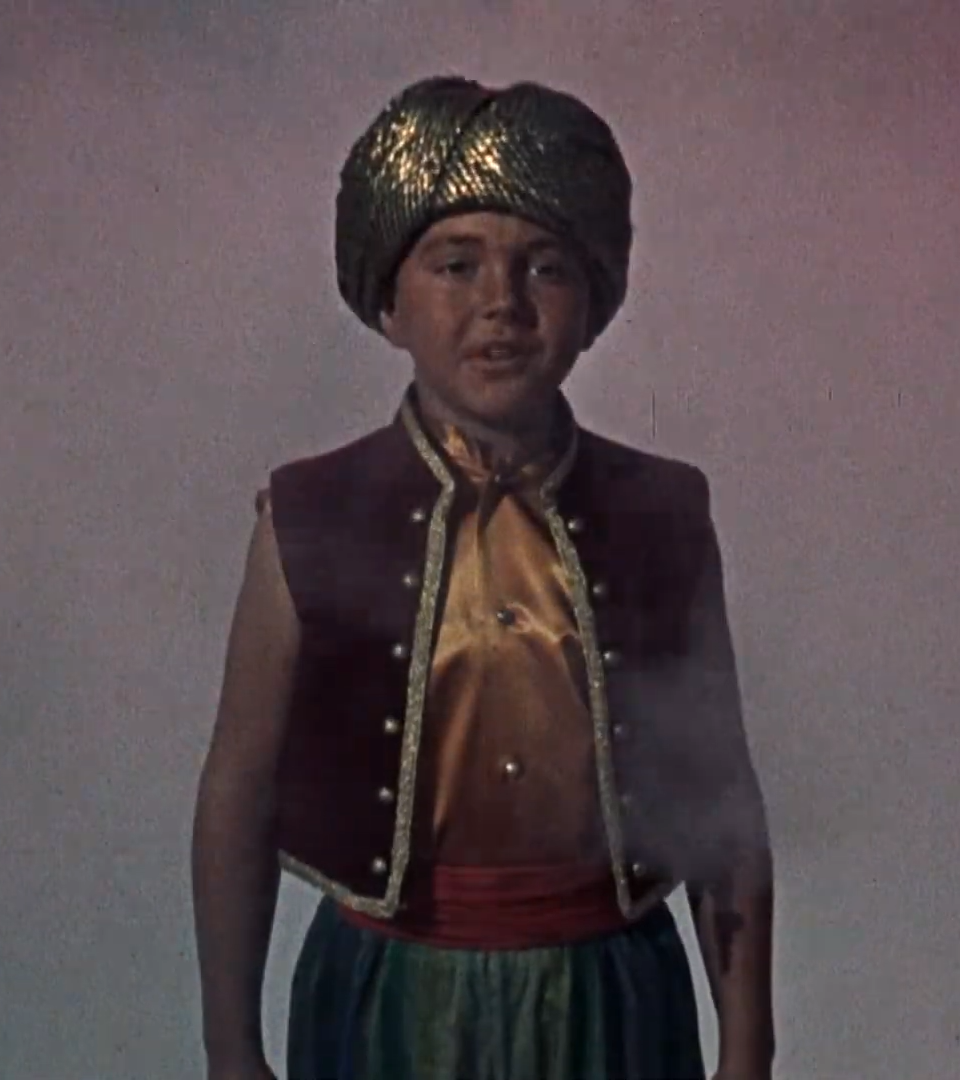
- Eyer in The 7th Voyage of Sinbad (1958)
- Born: Richard Ross Eyer; May 6, 1945 (age 81); Santa Monica, California, U.S.
- Occupations: Actor, schoolteacher
- Years active: 1952–1967
- Spouse(s): Laurie Lynn Seabern (1970–1983; divorced); 3 children
- Children: Samantha Rae Eyer; Benjamin Adam Eyer; Andrew Z. Eyer

Richard Ross Eyer (born May 6, 1945) is an American former child actor who worked during the 1950s and 1960s. He then became a teacher and taught at elementary schools in Bishop, California until he retired in 2006. He is the older brother of Robert Eyer (1948–2005), another child actor of the period.

== Career ==
In The Desperate Hours (1955), Eyer played Fredric March's dangerously impulsive son.

In 1956, he played a boy named Chuck in Canyon River which starred George Montgomery and Peter Graves. Also in 1956, he played the youngest child of Gary Cooper and Dorothy McGuire in Friendly Persuasion, about a Quaker family's life prior to and as the Civil War impacts their lives and community.

Eyer played a war orphan in "Homeward Borne", an episode of Playhouse 90, August 22, 1957, on CBS. He had the starring role in The Invisible Boy (1957), producer Nicholas Nayfack's independent sequel to MGM's Forbidden Planet.

He also starred in the 1958 western Fort Dobbs, with Clint Walker and Virginia Mayo and The 7th Voyage of Sinbad in 1958, in which he portrayed the metallic-voiced Barani the Genie.

He appeared in more than one hundred episodes of various television programs, including Rod Cameron's syndicated City Detective, when he was eight years of age. Other appearances include Arrest and Trial, Stoney Burke, Mr. Novak, Wagon Train, Wanted: Dead or Alive, Father Knows Best, Gunsmoke, Lassie, Rawhide and General Electric Theater.

In a 1995 interview, Eyer credited his mother for the promotion of his acting career. "It was all her work that did it. I had curly hair, freckles, and people would say what a cute kid he was and all that; so my mother entered me in some children's personality contests, and I won one of these which had been held at the Hollywood Bowl, and I guess that one was the springboard in getting me started. After that, I was hired for some television commercials and some modeling jobs, and this led into other things ... I was around fourteen when I did Stagecoach West ... My last role was at age 21, appearing in an episode of {ABC's} Combat!"

== Personal life ==
Eyer is divorced. He is the father of Samantha Rae Eyer, and twin sons, Benjamin Adam Eyer and Andrew Z. Eyer.

== Filmography ==
Year	Title	Role	Notes
1952	Invasion U.S.A.	Mulfory's Son	Uncredited
1953	It Happens Every Thursday	Stan	Uncredited
1954	Ma and Pa Kettle at Home	Billy Kettle	
1954	The Raid	Larry's Friend	Uncredited
1955	The Desperate Hours	Ralphie Hilliard	
1955	Sincerely Yours	Alvie Hunt	
1956	Come Next Spring	Abraham	
1956	The Kettles in the Ozarks	Billy Kettle	
1956	Canyon River	Chuck Hale	
1956	Friendly Persuasion	Little Jess Birdwell	
1957	Slander	Joey Martin	
1957	Bailout at 43,000	Kit Peterson	
1957	The Invisible Boy	Timmie Merrinoe	
1958	Fort Dobbs	Chad Gray	
1958	The 7th Voyage of Sinbad	The Genie	
1958	Johnny Rocco	Johnny Rocco	
1958	Father Knows Best	Burgess Vale	
1959	Wanted Dead or Alive	Montana Kid	Season 2 ep 1
1960	Hell to Eternity	Guy - as a Boy	
1959	Gunsmoke	Tommy - befriends ex outlaw	
1960	Wagon Train	Matthew Brant	
1960-61	Stagecoach West	David Kane	38 Episodes

== Bibliography ==
- Goldrup, Tom and Jim (2002). Growing Up on the Set: Interviews with 39 Former Child Actors of Film and Television. McFarland & Co. pp. 76–82. ISBN 1476613702.
- Holmstrom, John (1996). The Moving Picture Boy: An International Encyclopaedia from 1895 to 1995. Norwich: Michael Russell, p. 253.
