= Ransom (1996 film) =

1996 film directed by Ron Howard

- Theatrical release poster
- Directed by: Ron Howard
- Screenplay by: Richard Price; Alexander Ignon
- Based on: Ransom! 1956 movie Fearful Decision 1954 TV play by Cyril Hume and Richard Maibaum
- Produced by: Scott Rudin; Brian Grazer; B. Kipling Hagopian
- Starring: Mel Gibson; Rene Russo; Gary Sinise; Delroy Lindo; Lili Taylor
- Cinematography: Piotr Sobociński
- Edited by: Daniel P. Hanley; Mike Hill
- Music by: James Horner
- Production companies: Touchstone Pictures; Imagine Entertainment
- Distributed by: Buena Vista Pictures Distribution
- Release date: November 8, 1996
- Running time: 121 minutes
- Country: United States
- Language: English
- Budget: $70 million
- Box office: $309.5 million

Ransom is a 1996 American action thriller film directed by Ron Howard from a screenplay by Richard Price and Alexander Ignon. The film stars Mel Gibson, Rene Russo, Gary Sinise, Delroy Lindo, Lili Taylor, Brawley Nolte, Liev Schreiber, Donnie Wahlberg and Evan Handler. The plot follows the kidnapping of the son of millionaire Tom Mullen (Gibson), and his subsequent struggle to get him back alive.

Ransom was produced by Touchstone Pictures and Imagine Entertainment and released on November 8, 1996 by Buena Vista Pictures Distribution. Gibson was nominated for a Golden Globe Award for Best Actor – Motion Picture Drama. The film was the 5th highest-grossing film of 1996 in the United States. The original story came from a 1954 episode of The United States Steel Hour titled "Fearful Decision". In 1956, it was adapted by Cyril Hume and Richard Maibaum into the feature film, Ransom!, starring Glenn Ford, Donna Reed, and Leslie Nielsen.

== Plot ==
While millionaire airline magnate Tom Mullen and his wife Kate attend a science fair, their son Sean is kidnapped and taken to an apartment by Maris Conner, a caterer working for the Mullens; brothers Clark and Cubby Barnes; and tech expert Miles Roberts. Jimmy Shaker, an NYPD detective who is Maris's boyfriend, leads the operation. The assailants send Tom and Kate a video of a bound Sean demanding $2 million. Tom calls the FBI, who operate from his NYC penthouse under Special Agent Lonnie Hawkins.

Tom agrees to the FBI's plan for delivering the ransom. Receiving a phone call from Shaker, who electronically disguises his voice, Tom follows his instructions. He meets Cubby in a New Jersey quarry but refuses to hand over the money when Cubby does not give him the assailant’s promised directions to Sean. During the ensuing fight, the FBI shoots Cubby, who dies of his injuries before revealing Sean's location.

Tom realizes the kidnapper has no intention of returning Sean alive. Appearing on television, he presents the money with a warning he would not only refuse to pay the kidnappers, but offers the ransom money as a bounty on the kidnapper, dead or alive. Tom promises to withdraw the bounty and drop all charges only if the kidnapper returns Sean alive and unharmed. With a target on their back, Maris and Clark consider killing Sean and burying the body, but Shaker threatens them and orders them to stay the course.

Shaker lures Kate to a meeting where he assaults her and presents Sean's blood-stained T-shirt as a warning to pay the ransom, but Tom responds by doubling the bounty to $4 million. Shaker calls him to give him one final warning to pay, but he still refuses. After a heated argument, Shaker fires a gunshot in a wall after Tom hears Sean scream for help, leading Sean's parents to believe he is dead. Clark and Miles attempt to abandon the plan and flee, but Shaker, still determined to claim the ransom, requests police backup, claiming to have found the kidnappers, then kills both men. When Maris shoots him in the arm from behind, he kills her as well. The NYPD arrives to find Shaker with a badly beaten Sean, bound and eyes duct-taped over, while believing Shaker rescued Sean. Tom and Kate reunite with their son, while Shaker is hospitalized.

Shaker arrives at Tom's penthouse to claim the reward. However, both Sean and Tom recognize his voice and expressions as the assailant. Exposed, Shaker plans to kill everyone in the apartment if Tom attempts a double cross, but Tom persuades him to accompany him to the bank to get the money and leave peacefully. On the way, Tom discreetly alerts Hawkins, and the police and FBI converge on Tom and Shaker outside the bank.

As soon as Tom and Shaker exit the bank, two police officers attempt to detain Shaker, who shoots them. Tom knocks him to the ground, they struggle and hurl each other through a store window. Tom holds Shaker at gunpoint as the police and Hawkins arrive. In desperation, Shaker draws another gun from his ankle-holster but is shot dead by Tom and Hawkins. Police rush in to arrest Tom, but Hawkins orders them to stand down. Tom is allowed to leave the scene with Kate.

== Cast ==
- Mel Gibson as Tom Mullen, a wealthy airline magnate determined to save his son
- Rene Russo as Kate Mullen, Tom's wife
- Gary Sinise as Jimmy Shaker, a corrupt NYPD detective who is the mastermind of the kidnapping
- Delroy Lindo as Lonnie Hawkins, an FBI Special Agent tasked with saving Sean
- Lili Taylor as Maris Conner, a caterer working for the Mullens and kidnapper dating Shaker
- Liev Schreiber as Clark Barnes, one of the kidnappers working for Shaker and Cubby's brother
- Evan Handler as Miles Roberts, Shaker's tech guy
- Donnie Wahlberg as "Cubby" Barnes, one of the kidnappers working for Shaker and Clark's brother
- Brawley Nolte as Sean Mullen, Tom & Kate's son who was kidnapped
- Dan Hedaya as Jackie Brown, a union machinist imprisoned after being involved in one of Tom's business scandals
- Paul Guilfoyle as FBI Director Stan Wallace
- Michael Gaston as Agent Jack Sickler
- José Zuniga as David Torres, Tom's right-hand man
- Nancy Ticotin as Agent Kimba Welch
- John Ortiz as Roberto
- David Vadim as an NYPD Officer

== Reception ==
=== Box office ===
For its opening weekend, Ransom collected a total gross of $34.2 million, beating out Romeo + Juliet and Set It Off to secure the number one spot. Upon its debut, it had the second-highest opening weekend for a Disney film, behind The Lion King, as well as the company's largest live-action opening weekend, surpassing the previous record held by The Rock five months earlier. The film held the latter record until the opening of Armageddon in July 1998. Ransom also achieved the third-highest November opening weekend, after Ace Ventura: When Nature Calls and Interview with the Vampire. It would hold the record for having the highest opening weekend for a Ron Howard film for four years until 2000 when it was taken by How the Grinch Stole Christmas. Although it was overtaken by Space Jam in its second weekend, Ransom would still make $22.3 million and outgross newcomer The Mirror Has Two Faces.

During its theatrical run, Ransom earned $136.4 million domestically and $309.5 million worldwide, making it the seventh-highest-grossing film of 1996.

=== Critical response ===
On the review aggregator website Rotten Tomatoes, 73% of 74 critics' reviews are positive. The website's consensus reads: "Directed with propulsive intensity by Ron Howard, Ransom is a fiery thriller packed with hot-blooded performances and jolting twists." Metacritic, which uses a weighted average, assigned the film a score of 61 out of 100, based on 21 critics, indicating "generally favorable" reviews. Audiences polled by CinemaScore gave the film an average grade of "A−" on an A+ to F scale.

Critic Roger Ebert gave the film three stars out of four and wrote, "Gibson gives an interesting performance, showing a man trying to think his way out of a crisis, and Sinise makes a good foil: Here are two smart men playing a game with deadly stakes."

== Awards and nominations ==
1997 ASCAP Film and Television Music Awards

- Won – Top Box Office Film

1997 Academy of Science Fiction, Fantasy & Horror Films (Saturn Awards)

- Nominated – Best Action/Adventure/Thriller Film

1997 Golden Globe Awards

- Nominated – Best Actor - Motion Picture Drama – Mel Gibson

1997 Image Awards

- Nominated – Outstanding Supporting Actor in a Motion Picture – Delroy Lindo

1997 Young Artist Awards

- Nominated - Best Performance in a Feature Film – Supporting Young Actor – Brawley Nolte
