= The Invisible Boy =

1957 film by Herman Hoffman

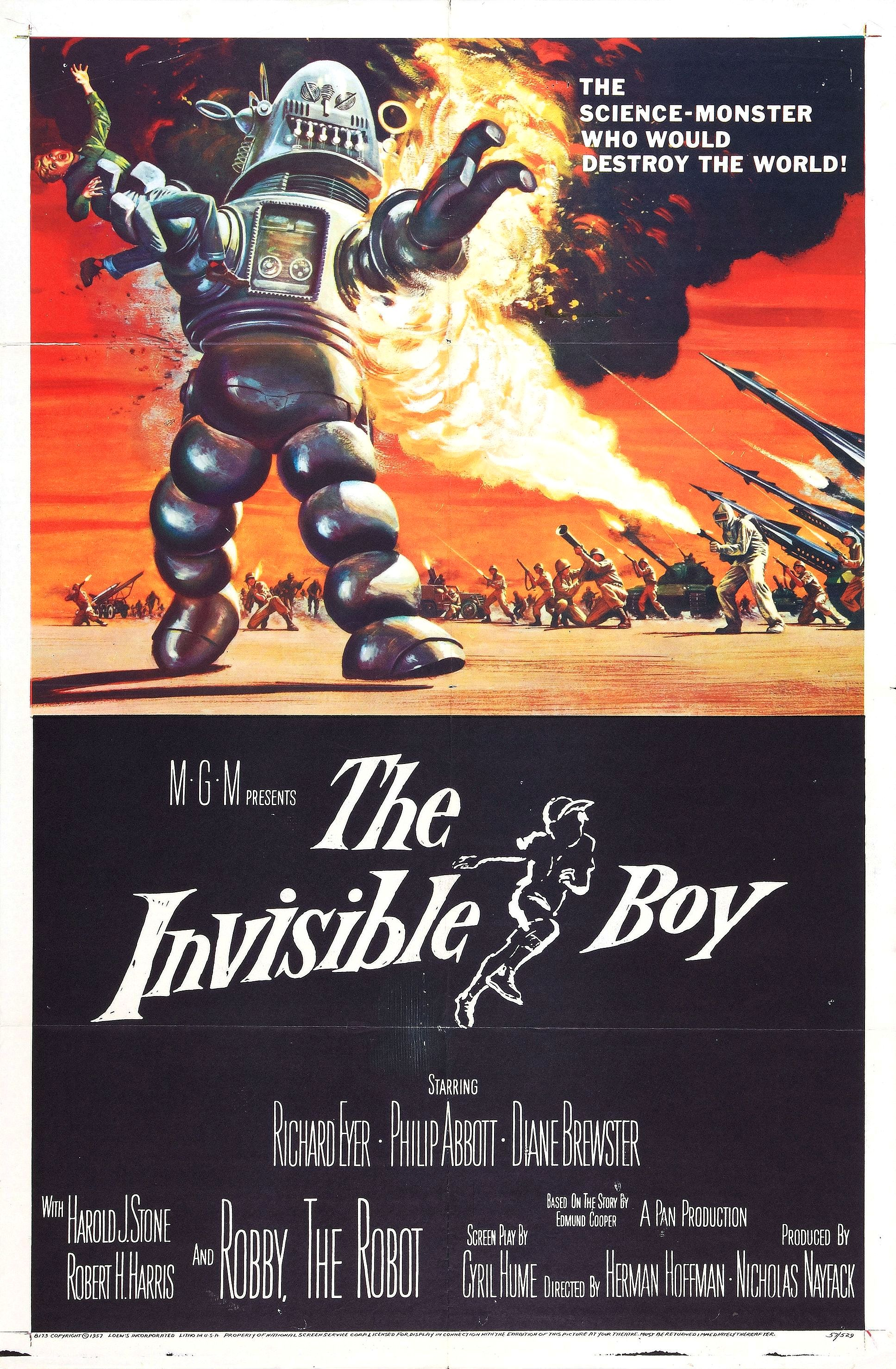
- Film poster by Reynold Brown
- Directed by: Herman Hoffman
- Written by: Cyril Hume
- Based on: "The Story of Timothy — The World's Worst Problem Child" by Edmund Cooper
- Produced by: Nicholas Nayfack
- Starring: Richard Eyer; Philip Abbott; Diane Brewster; Harold J. Stone
- Cinematography: Harold E. Wellman
- Edited by: John Faure
- Music by: Les Baxter
- Distributed by: Metro-Goldwyn-Mayer
- Release date: October 1957
- Running time: 90 minutes
- Country: United States
- Language: English
- Budget: $384,000
- Box office: $840,000

The Invisible Boy, a.k.a. S.O.S Spaceship, is a 1957 black-and-white American science fiction film from Metro-Goldwyn-Mayer, produced by Nicholas Nayfack, directed by Herman Hoffman, and starring Richard Eyer and Philip Abbott. It is the second film appearance of Robby the Robot, who memorably appeared the previous year in MGM's Forbidden Planet.

== Plot ==
In 1957, ten-year-old Timmie Merrinoe is a bit dull and only wants a playmate. His frustrated father takes him to the research lab where he works and has him evaluated by a supercomputer. The computer hypnotizes Timmie and enhances his intelligence.

Timmie asks his father about Robby. A surprised Dr. Merrinoe explains that the former head of the institute, Dr. Greenhill, claimed to have built a time machine and traveled to the future Chicago spaceport. He brought back a robot nicknamed Robby, as well as a photograph dated March 16, 2309. It captures Robby's arrival on Earth in a space cruiser. Greenhill disassembled Robby to try to understand his circuitry but could not reassemble him. With his enhanced intelligence, Timmie quickly rebuilds Robby.

No one pays much attention to the robot after Timmie repairs it. He brings Robby to the supercomputer which usurps Timmie as its master. The computer cancels Robby's prohibition against harming humans. Robby soon lets Timmie ride on an enormous powered kite that they built. The dangerous stunt enrages Timmie's mother.

When Timmie expresses a wish to be able to play without being observed by his parents, Robby, with the aid of the supercomputer, makes him invisible. At first, Timmie uses his invisibility to play simple pranks on his parents and others, but the mood soon changes when it becomes clear that the supercomputer is independent, ingenious, and evil. It uses hypnosis and electronic implants to control human beings and intends to take over the world using a military weapons satellite.

The computer declares its intent to destroy all life on Earth, conquer the entire galaxy, and exterminate any life that it contains, even bacteria. The computer takes Timmie captive aboard a rocket. The army's weapons are impotent against Robby, who boards the ship. In order to become fully autonomous, the computer needs a code that only Dr. Merrinoe knows. It tries to coerce Dr. Merrinoe by making him watch Robby surgically torture Timmie, but Robby frees Timmie rather than obey the supercomputer. Dr. Merrinoe tells Timmie and Robby to remain on board the ship, as it has enough supplies for him to last a year. Instead, Timmie and Robby return to Earth.

Timmie and Dr. Merrinoe return to the laboratory to shut down the supercomputer, but it stops them. Robby then shows up and turns against the supercomputer, destroying its power source. Dr. Merrinoe is about to spank Timmie as punishment for ignoring him. He is stopped by Robby, whose protective programming has been restored. The film ends with a shot of the Merrinoes enjoying a peaceful evening with Robby.

== Cast ==
- Richard Eyer as Timmie Merrinoe
- Philip Abbott as Dr. Tom Merrinoe
- Diane Brewster as Mary Merrinoe
- Harold J. Stone as Gen. Swayne
- Robert H. Harris as Prof. Frank Allerton
- Dennis McCarthy as Col. Macklin
- Alexander Lockwood as Arthur Kelvaney
- John O'Malley as Prof. Baine
- Robby the Robot as Robby
- Gage Clarke as Dr. Bannerman
- Than Wyenn as Prof. Zeller
- Jefferson Searles as Prof. Foster (as Jefferson Dudley Searles)
- Alfred Linder as Martin / Computer
- Ralph Votrian as 1st Gate Sergeant
- Michael Miller as 2nd Gate Sergeant
- Marvin Miller as Robby the Robot (voice) (uncredited)
- Frankie Darro as Robby the Robot (operator)

== Production ==
Nicholas Nayfack was a line producer for Metro-Goldwyn-Mayer when he was assigned to Forbidden Planet. Frustrated at working on contract and not sharing profits, he decided to establish Pan Productions, which he named after his wife. He got the idea for his first independent project after reading Edmund Cooper's "The Story of Timothy — The World's Worst Problem Child", which was published in The Saturday Evening Post on June 23, 1956.

MGM agreed to distribute the film. Nayfack's contract included access to material from Forbidden Planet. He brought back Forbidden Planet's screenwriter Cyril Hume to adapt the story. Hume was instructed to work Robby the Robot into the narrative.

MGM also offered production facilities and staff, but Nayfack was determined to produce the film independently on a modest budget. The most impressive set was the supercomputer designed by Merril Pye. It was assembled at Samuel Goldwyn Studio with equipment and staff from Remington Rand and Radiophone.

Richard Eyer recalled two versions of Robby the Robot. One could be plugged directly into a power source, and the other ran on a battery. Whenever Robby toppled over and the actor inside was injured, Eyer would be hurried out of earshot to shield him from the ensuing adult language. Director Herman Hoffman remembered Frankie Darro being too drunk one day to stay upright in the suit. When he fell and damaged the expensive costume, Nayfack was particularly inconsolable while shooting was delayed in order to repair it.

== Reception ==
MGM released The Invisible Boy in the fall of 1957 without much promotion. It was considered unprofitable. According to the Eddie Mannix Ledger, the movie earned $390,000 in the United States and Canada and $450,000 overseas, for a total of $840,000. With a budget of $384,000, this resulted in a profit of $456,000.

Variety called it "the type of scifi excitement that will appeal to moppet audiences especially" and praised Nayfack for bringing back Robby the Robot from Forbidden Planet.

The Invisible Boy is sometimes described as a spin-off from Forbidden Planet, rather than a sequel. The movie poster prominently features Robby clutching young Timmie, presenting the automaton as the film's villain. One of Robby's original designers, Irving Block, later objected to the change, "They corrupted poor Robby and made him into a heavy. He was always designed as a good robot, not as a destructive machine." During the 1950s, Robby was the most famous emblem of Isaac Asimov's Three Laws of Robotics. By the end of The Invisible Boy, his obedience to the evil computer is outmatched by his original programming to not harm humans. Robby's film career was over, but he appeared frequently in TV shows like The Twilight Zone and Lost in Space.

== Home media ==
The entire feature film appears as an extra on the Forbidden Planet 50th Anniversary DVD released in 2006 and on the Blu-ray disc released in 2010. Even on Blu-ray, the film is in standard definition.
