= Fearful Decision =

- The United States Steel Hour episode
- Episode no.: Season 1 Episode 18
- Directed by: Alex Segal
- Teleplay by: Richard Maibaum; Cyril Hume
- Original air date: 22 June 1954

Guest appearances
- Ralph Bellamy; Sam Levene; Meg Mundy; Edward Binns; Frank Overton; Joey Fallon

"Fearful Decision" is a 1954 episode of the TV series The United States Steel Hour starring Ralph Bellamy as David Durfee, the father, Sam Levene as McArdle, a crime reporter, Meg Mundy as Edith, Joey Fallon as son Davie and George Mitchell as the police chief. It was later adapted into the feature films Ransom! (1956) and Ransom (1996). "Fearful Decision" was co-authored by Richard Maibaum, an American film producer, playwright and screenwriter in the United States best known for his screenplay adaptations of Ian Fleming's James Bond novels.

== Reception ==
The New York Times praised Ralph Bellamy's "magnificent performance" but thought the story lacked "fundamental credibility."

Produced by The Theatre Guild, the script and Ralph Bellamy's performance were both nominated for Emmys.

In May 1955 it was announced MGM had bought the film rights.
