= The Scarlet Coat =

1955 film

- Theatrical release poster
- Directed by: John Sturges
- Written by: Karl Tunberg
- Produced by: Nicholas Nayfack
- Starring: Cornel Wilde; Michael Wilding; George Sanders; Anne Francis
- Narrated by: Paul Frees
- Cinematography: Paul C. Vogel
- Edited by: Ben Lewis
- Music by: Conrad Salinger
- Production company: Metro-Goldwyn-Mayer
- Distributed by: Metro-Goldwyn-Mayer
- Release date: July 29, 1955
- Running time: 101 minutes
- Country: United States
- Language: English
- Budget: $1.6 million
- Box office: $1.2 million

The Scarlet Coat is a 1955 American historical drama and swashbuckler in Eastmancolor and CinemaScope released by Metro-Goldwyn-Mayer, produced by Nicholas Nayfack, directed by John Sturges. It stars Cornel Wilde, Michael Wilding, George Sanders, and Anne Francis. The film is based upon the events in the American Revolution in which Benedict Arnold offered to surrender the fort at West Point to the British in exchange for money.

The film purports to tell the story of the creation of the "American Secret Service". It weaves a spy/counterspy tale in which British and American counterparts, played by Michael Wilding as the historical personage Major John André and Cornel Wilde as the fictional Major John Bolton (Bolton being the "code name" used real life Continental Army Intelligence officer Benjamin Tallmadge; for this film it is simply treated as the character's actual name), each unaware that the other is attempting to outsmart him for the sake of their countries, deal with issues of honor, loyalty, and friendship. There is also some rivalry between the men for the love of a beautiful woman, the fictional Sally Cameron (Anne Francis).

While historically André and Major Benjamin Tallmadge, Bolton's historical counterpart, did meet shortly before André was to be hanged as a spy (Talmadge's regiment of light dragoons was charged with guarding André), their acquaintance was not the longer-term and deeper friendship suggested in the film. Bolton betrays this friendship out of duty in the film, but Karl Tunberg's script ameliorates that difficulty by having Bolton make attempts to save Andre's life. Another important departure from history is that during the course of events André saves Bolton when the latter is arrested for being a spy, something that never occurred. (Note: The real Major Talmadge, whose code name as master of the Culper Spy Ring was "John Bolton", never undertook spy activities out of uniform, as Wilde's character does.)

André is treated sympathetically in the film while Wilde's fictional Major Bolton is portrayed as more ruthless, particularly in the brutality he employs to accomplish his objectives. The script is noted for its even-handedness in depicting both sides of the conflict.

It was Olaf Hytten's last film appearance.

== Plot ==
In 1780 General Benedict Arnold commands the Continental Army defenses at West Point, New York. Major John Bolton (Cornel Wilde), a dragoon officer assigned to counterintelligence, intercepts and kills a British spy leaving the Storm King Tavern, and captures a letter found on his body. He reports to Gen. Robert Howe (John McIntire), that the coded message was from the British spy calling himself "Gustavus" to "James Osborn", in care of Dr. Jonathan Odell (Note: Although the actual Odell studied medicine, he chose as his vocation ordination as a minister.) of New York, stating that Arnold has taken command at West Point. The secret knowledge indicates that the spy is a "highly placed person". Bolton returns to the tavern, where one of his contacts, stable boy Ben Potter (Bobby Driscoll), tells him that the Tory wife of a redcoat, Mrs. Sally Cameron (Anne Francis), is traveling under a flag of truce possibly carrying information to the enemy. She catches them searching her room, where Bolton takes her safe conduct pass after verbally sparring with her. Mrs. Cameron tries to seduce Bolton to obtain its return, but he rebuffs her. A messenger arrives with a package for "Mr. Moody", but when no one by that name can be found, another traveler, Col. Winfield, (Note: Both Bolton's "5th Dragoons" and Winfield's "2nd Connecticut Light Horse" were entirely fictional. Only four mounted regiments existed in the Continental Army, all part of the Continental Light Dragoons. Only two state regiments were mustered, both part of the Southern Army, and were unnumbered.) offers to deliver the package. Bolton recognizes that Winfield is an imposter, and in a struggle over the package, kills him. Other American officers arrest Bolton for murder and deliver him to Howe.

A pass through the lines found hidden in Winfield's boot reveals that the impostor was actually Moody, a spy, who had another coded letter from "Gustavus" to "Osborn" in his possession. The package, a ream of blank paper, concealed a message from "Osborn" written in invisible ink requesting an urgent meeting to finalize an unknown arrangement. Howe proposes that Bolton feign desertion to the British. Bolton agrees, aware that he could be hanged if the British discover his mission. With Moody's pass, Bolton passes through the British lines, but the British lieutenant on duty recognizes that he is not the same man who previously used the pass and follows him. In New York, Bolton calls upon Dr. Odell (George Sanders), trying to deliver the letter. The lieutenant bursts in to arrest Bolton, but when he addresses him as "Mr. Moody", Odell takes Bolton and the letter to British Army Major John André (Michael Wilding) for deciphering, using a pair of spectacles to isolate key words. Bolton claims that he was Moody's source of information. He offers to continue working for the British. Odell bluntly tells Bolton that he thinks his story is too neat and believes him to be a Rebel spy. But André takes an immediate liking to Bolton. He invites him to a dinner party that evening, where Bolton suffers an anxious moment when Sally Cameron (unmarried and André's mistress) is present. Bolton's explanation corroborates information about the murder that André had checked, and Sally provides the perfect eyewitness.

Bolton is sent with two Tory agents to sabotage the chain barrier across the Hudson River before a British attack on the American position at Verplanck, so that British warships can pass. (Note: The film is in error placing the chain between Verplanck and Stony Point. Verplanck was however the location of the strategic King's Ferry crossing of the Hudson, held by the Americans in 1780, and used a year later by Washington's army marching to Yorktown.) André gives one a letter to deliver afterwards at the Storm King Tavern. Bolton drowns one agent, but when he tries to arrest the other, is confronted by an armed Ben Potter, who still thinks that Bolton is a murderer and deserter. The agent disarms Ben and nearly kills Bolton. Ben finds his gun and shoots the agent. At a secret meeting with Howe, Bolton uses spectacles to decipher the letter, which points to Gustavus as someone at West Point with authority. Bolton volunteers to return to New York to identify the mysterious "James Osborn". Odell more than ever believes Bolton is a spy, but Bolton convinces André that the British agents completed their mission.

To trap him, Odell writes a false dispatch from "Mr. Osborn" for Bolton to steal. At another dinner, Bolton notices that Sally Cameron only pretends to toast the King. She has also fallen in love with him and warns Bolton about Odell's trap. The British attack on Verplanck is crushed and results in Bolton's arrest as a Rebel spy. He is saved from hanging by André, who intervenes for him after Sally confesses her feelings for Bolton and begs him to vouch on Bolton's behalf. He does so, despite her refusal of his marriage proposal. Putting duty before personal considerations, André asks Bolton to accompany him to a meeting between "Gustavus" and "Osborn" aboard the sloop Vulture. André assures Bolton that "Gustavus" and "Osborn" have conjured a quick end to the war. The wily "Gustavus" changes the meeting at the last moment to the house of a Tory sympathizer and orders André to come alone. Bolton persuades André to go in uniform, and not in civilian clothing, lest he be captured as a spy. Soon after, Odell detects Bolton warning American shore batteries of the British presence, but Bolton escapes by swimming ashore to the American garrison. The American commander, Col. Jameson (James Westerfield), is skeptical of Bolton's loyalties and stubbornly holds him until Howe can vouch for him. "Gustavus" escapes. "Osborn" is captured and Bolton realizes that Benedict Arnold is "Gustavus". To his horror, Bolton learns that "Osborn" is André, and worse, that he changed into civilian clothes trying to escape.

At André's court-martial, Bolton testifies that André entered the lines in uniform and changed into civilian clothing only at Arnold's treacherous orders. The court reluctantly sentences André to be executed as a spy. André pledges his continuing friendship with Bolton and asks him to protect Sally from any retribution. Bolton brokers a last-minute deal to exchange André for Arnold, but André considers the suggestion a taint on his honor and declines.

== Cast ==
- Cornel Wilde as Major John Bolton
- Michael Wilding as Major John André
- Anne Francis as Sally Cameron
- George Sanders as Dr. Jonathan Odell
- Robert Douglas as Benedict Arnold
- John McIntire as General Robert Howe
- Rhys Williams as Peter
- John Dehner as General Nathanael Greene
- James Westerfield as Col. Jameson
- Ashley Cowan as Mr. Brown
- Paul Cavanagh as Sir Henry Clinton
- John Alderson as Mr. Durkin
- John O'Malley as Col. Winfield
- Bobby Driscoll as Ben Potter
- Paul Frees as Narrator (uncredited)
- Olaf Hytten as Maj. Andre's Butler (uncredited)
- Gordon Richards as Mr. Cameron (uncredited)

== Production ==
As reported in April 1952 in Daily Variety, the genesis of the film was the original story "Betrayal on the Hudson" by Hollister Noble and Sidney Harmon, purchased by Metro-Goldwyn-Mayer as the basis for the screenplay of The Scarlet Coat. In January 1953 The Hollywood Reporter listed Stewart Granger in the role of John Bolton and Robert Pirosh as the film's director. Later that year Robert Taylor was named Granger's replacement, to co-star with Michael Wilding.

In June 1954 production was delayed because of a shortage of sound stage space and stagehands. Exteriors filmed on location in Tarrytown, New York and on the Hudson River were shot in the autumn of 1954 to capture fall foliage for depicting the historical September 1780 time frame.

The film is available for streaming and on Region 1 NTSC DVD at Amazon. For several years it has been shown on Turner Classic Movies on Independence Day.

== Reception ==
According to MGM records, the film earned $449,000 in the U.S. and Canada and $719,000 elsewhere, resulting in a loss of $1,158,000.

== See also ==
- List of films about the American Revolution
- List of television series and miniseries about the American Revolution
