= Stagecoach West (TV series) =

American Western television series (1960–1961)

- Genre: Western
- Starring: Wayne Rogers; Richard Eyer; Robert Bray
- Composers: Skip Martin; Terry Gilkyson
- Country of origin: United States
- Original language: English
- No. of seasons: 1
- No. of episodes: 38

Production
- Producer: Vincent M. Fennelly
- Running time: 46–48 minutes
- Production company: Four Star-Hilgarde

Original release
- Network: ABC
- Release: October 4, 1960 – June 27, 1961

Stagecoach West is an American Western television series about stagecoach drivers on the American frontier. It stars Wayne Rogers, Richard Eyer, and Robert Bray, and originally aired on ABC. It premiered on October 4, 1960 and ended on June 27, 1961, with a total of 38 episodes over the course of one season.

== Synopsis ==
Luke Perry and Simon "Sime" Kane are veterans of the American Civil War who own and operate a stagecoach line on the American frontier. They share driving duties during stagecoach runs, and Sime′s courageous and resourceful son Davey often accompanies them on their trips. Based in the remote, unincorporated frontier town of Outpost in the Wyoming Territory, they have many adventures — involving murders, robberies, swindles, hijackings, range wars, and attacks by renegade Indians, renegade soldiers, and Mexican revolutionaries — during their stagecoach journeys as they transport passengers and baggage across the Old West. Although the characters never age, the events depicted in the episodes of Stagecoach West appear to take place at various times between the mid-1860s and the 1890s.

Dan Murchison is the kind and genial proprietor of the general store in Outpost, which also doubles as a bank. Zeke Bonner operates a way station called The Halfway House, at which Luke, Sime, and Davey′s stagecoach often makes a stop. Cal is the clerk in the stagecoach line′s office in the town of Timberline. Hugh Strickland is the United States Marshal in Timberline, and he eventually makes Luke and Sime deputy U.S. marshals. Doc Apperson is a physician whose practice includes the area where the stagecoach line operates. When the series begins, Davey has a dog named Hannibal; in Episode 6, it is announced that Hannibal has run away, but Davey adopts another dog from a stagecoach passenger, and the new dog becomes Hannibal II.

== Cast ==
From left to right: Robert Bray as Sime Kane, the dog Hannibal II, Richard Eyer as Davey Kane, and Wayne Rogers as Luke Perry in a publicity photo for Stagecoach West.

- Wayne Rogers as Luke Perry
- Richard Eyer as Davey Kane
- Robert Bray as Simon "Sime" Kane
- James Burke as Zeke Bonner
- John Litel as Dan Murchison
- Olan Soule as Cal
- Robert J. Stevenson as Marshal Hugh Strickland
- J. Pat O'Malley as Doc Apperson (two episodes)
- Sydney Smith as Doc Apperson (one episode)

== Production ==
Four Star-Hilgarde produced Stagecoach West and Vincent M. Fennelly served as producer for the series. George Blair directed two episodes, and Harry Harris Jr., directed one, and Donald McDougall or Thomas Carr directed the rest.

D.D. Beauchamp and Mary M. Beauchamp wrote many the episodes. Other episode writers included Bob Barbash, Martin Berkeley, Will C. Brown, John K. Butler, Roy Chanslor, Herman Epstein, Kenneth Gammet, Ward Hawkins, Paul King, Frederick J. Lipp, Frank L. Moss, William D. Powell, John Robinson, Joe Stone, and N. B. Stone Jr.

Skip Martin and Terry Gilkyson composed the show's music. Bud & Travis sang the theme song over the closing credits.

== Broadcast history ==
Stagecoach West premiered on October 4, 1960, and 38 episodes were produced. They aired on ABC on Tuesdays at 9:00 p.m. Eastern Time. The show was cancelled after a single season, and its last new episode was broadcast on June 27, 1961. Prime-time reruns of Stagecoach West then aired in its regular time slot until September 26, 1961.

== Episodes ==
No.	Title	Directed by	Written by	Original release date
1	"High Lonesome"	Donald McDougall	D.D. Beauchamp & Mary M. Beauchamp	October 4, 1960
After Simon "Sime" Kane′s wife Kathleen deserts him, he embezzles $2,000 from his employer, Tom Osgood Sr., to fund his search for her. Osgood detects the theft and forces Sime to work off the value of the money he stole, but after they get into a fistfight, Sime pays Osgood back out of his savings and boards a stagecoach driven by Luke Perry to set off in search of Kathleen. Meanwhile, a vengeful Osgood hires a gunman, Les Hardeen, to hunt down and kill Sime. When the stagecoach encounters a heavy rainstorm, Sime — who has experience driving stagecoaches — spells Luke at the reins and impresses Luke with his driving skills. They stop at a way station to wait out the storm and find Kathleen there. Hardeen also arrives, and in an ensuing gunfight Kathleen is mortally wounded while trying to protect Sime and Hardeen is killed. Luke hires Sime to drive for the stagecoach line — and Sime never tells Davey that the woman he met at the way station was his mother. Guest appearances: Jane Greer, James Best, Robert F. Simon, Paul Engle, Stafford Repp, and Norman Leavitt.
2	"The Land Beyond"	Thomas Carr	D.D. Beauchamp & Mary M. Beauchamp	October 11, 1960
Luke and Sime set up their stagecoach line in the remote, unincorporated frontier town of Outpost and set out on their first run. Aboard their stagecoach is a couple from the East that had eloped and is heading to the West. They encounter Cole Dawson, a gunman the bride's father hired to find the couple, kill the husband, and bring the bride home. A shootout ensues in which the brave and resourceful Davey kills Dawson with the blast of a shotgun stored aboard the stagecoach. Guest appearances: Gigi Perreau, Robert Harland, John Anderson, Lane Bradford, Don Kennedy, and Lester Dorr.
3	"Dark Return"	Donald McDougall	John K. Butler	October 18, 1960
After Frankie Niles, a 17-year-old sailor making his way home, beds down for the night in a livery stable, he sees Jed Culver kill his brother, Stan Culver, the owner of the stable. Jed Culver spots Frankie and shoots at him, but Frankie escapes. Frankie and Culver soon meet again, however, and Culver blackmails Frankie into helping him rob the bank at Murchison's store, which by now is the sponsor of Luke and Sime's stagecoach line. Culver also clubs Davey′s dog Hannibal nearly to death. Hannibal recovers, but Luke, Sime, and Davey set out to bring Culver to justice. Guest appearances: Billy Gray, John G. Kellogg, Frank Wilcox, Shirley R. O'Hara, Jim Hyland, Robert S. Carson, and Alan Wells.
4	"The Unwanted"	Donald McDougall	Ward Hawkins	October 25, 1960
When Luke makes an unscheduled stop to take a lame horse out of the lead position, an unruly passenger, Johnny Kelly, accuses him of leaving the stagecoach and its passengers vulnerable to robbers. A fight ensues in which Kelly pulls a derringer and Luke is obliged to shoot him to death in self-defense. A hearing Murchison conducts into the incident exonerates Luke, but Kelly's distraught widow Mary and another stagecoach passenger, gambler Ben Marble, continue to blame him for Kelly's death. Marble takes a proprietary interest in Mary, and the two of them depart on another stagecoach after Mary impulsively leaves her eight-year-old daughter in Luke's care. Davey adjusts to life with what amounts to a foster sister until Luke can return Sara to Mary. Guest appearances: Tammy Marihugh, Gerald Mohr, Richard Crane, Paul Busch, Ella G. Ethridge, and Bethel Leslie.
5	"A Fork in the Road"	Thomas Carr	D.D. Beauchamp & Mary M. Beauchamp	November 1, 1960
Disreputable former soldiers rob a grave, remove a corpse, and hire the stagecoach line to transport the corpse west as cargo. Sime and Davey depart on the trip without any passengers, but after they pick up Stacey Gibbs, a passenger with an interest in the contents of the coffin, the stagecoach is hijacked, and Sime and Davey are held hostage for several days. Guest appearances: Jack Warden, Jack Elam, Richard Devon, Joe Perry, and Riley Hill.
6	"A Time to Run"	Thomas Carr	Joe Stone & Paul King	November 15, 1960
When a group of six bounty hunters led by a man named Joe Brandy attempt to capture Manola Marcial Lalanda — a colonel in the army of the Emperor of Mexico Maximilian I with a price placed on his head by the government of President of Mexico Benito Juárez — he escapes, but not before one of Brandy′s men inflicts a gunshot wound on him. As Luke and Davey are making a stagecoach run, Lalanda holds them up, seeking to steal one of the horses, but Luke disarms him and he passes out from loss of blood. Luke places the unconscious Lalanda in the stagecoach, intending to turn him in to the authorities at the next town. When the stagecoach stops at the Halfway House, however, Brandy and his men arrive and demand custody of Lalanda. A siege ensues when the stagecoach passengers and the other people at the Halfway House decide to defend Lalanda from Brandy and his men. Guest appearances: Cesar Romero, Steven Marlo, Than Wyenn, Richard Coogan, William Schallert, Guy Wilkerson, Maxine Cooper, Lester Dorr, and Barbara Nichols.
7	"Red Sand"	Donald McDougall	John Robinson & Will C. Brown	November 22, 1960
While Sime and Davey are heading for Outpost carrying freight, two bank robbers fleeing from a posse — Joe Brady and a wounded man named Tanner — hijack the stagecoach during a sandstorm. They steal the horses and bring Sime and Davey along as hostages. After they take shelter from the sandstorm in the cabin of an impoverished woman named Martha Whitlock, Tanner faints from loss of blood and Brady forces Sime to remove a bullet from Tanner′s shoulder. When Sime, Martha, and Brady go to a store for food, Brady reveals that he has been poor and hungry throughout his life and no one but Tanner had ever respected him. Brady gains Sime's and Martha's sympathy, but when they return to Martha's cabin they find the posse has arrived and taken possession of it. Sime and Martha then decide to help Brady escape. Guest appearances: Dean Jones, Diana Millay, Edgar Buchanan, Guy Stockwell, John Damler, Warren Vanders, and Harold J. Stone.
8	"The Saga of Jeremy Boone"	Thomas Carr	John Robinson	November 29, 1960
Luke and Davey head west with a passenger list that includes Jeremy Boone, a descendant of Daniel Boone who boasts of wearing a money belt that contains $40,000, and Felicia Sparks, a con woman. When the stagecoach arrives at The Halfway House, they encounter Felicia's estranged husband, conman Deuce Stone. The Stones decide to cheat Boone out of his money, but Felicia has second thoughts, and a gunfight ensues. Guest appearances: Ben Cooper, Steve Brodie, Hugh Sanders, Sheila Pinkham, Joseph Mell, Joe Conley, and Marti Stevens.
9	"Life Sentence"	Donald McDougall	Don Brinkley	December 6, 1960
Leo Calloway, an embittered Confederate States Army veteran who blames a comrade named Toby Reese — who deserted him on the battlefield during the Siege of Vicksburg in the American Civil War — for the loss of his arm, holds up the stagecoach looking for Reese, but finds only Sime driving and Davey and Davey's new dog Hannibal II – a replacement for the original Hannibal, who ran away — riding inside. In Timberline, Calloway finds Reese and torments him by shooting at his feet to force him to dance. The gunfire spooks the stagecoach's horses, and they run down and seriously injure Davey, leaving him unconscious. Calloway's wife also hates Reese, but she nurses Davey. Despite Marshal Strickland's efforts to keep the peace, Reese finally decides he must defend himself, resulting in a confrontation with Calloway at gunpoint. Guest appearances: Harry Townes, Virginia Grey, Bruce Gordon, and Robert J. Stevenson.
10	"The Storm"	Thomas Carr	D.D. Beauchamp & Mary M. Beauchamp	December 13, 1960
After Zeke falls ill, Luke — whom Marshal Strickland has made a deputy U.S. marshal — sets out in the stagecoach, taking Doc Apperson to The Halfway House to treat Zeke. Along the way, Sherry Hilton — an ambitious, cold-blooded, and ruthless young woman who has stolen $50,000 from the bank where she works in order to buy the love of a man named Selby (or Shelby) Moss and killed the banker after stealing the money — holds up the stagecoach and steals its horses so that she and Selby can escape. After Sherry and Selby arrive at The Halfway House, Sherry shoots and kills Zeke's employee Charlie, but not before Charlie wounds Selby. Meanwhile, a snowstorm strikes as the stranded Luke and Doc struggle toward The Halfway House on foot, and Luke is forced to leave Doc in a cave with a fire while he walks to The Halfway House alone. When he arrives, Sherry forces him to tend to Selby's wounds at gunpoint. Guest appearances: Beverly Garland, Tom Drake, and Damian O'Flynn.
11	"Three Wise Men"	Thomas Carr	D.D. Beauchamp & Mary M. Beauchamp	December 20, 1960
Sime — who Marshal Strickland has made a deputy U.S. marshal along with Luke — gives a young man named Webb Crawford a free stagecoach ride to The Halfway House, where Crawford reveals that he is a fugitive wanted for robbery, is dying of leukemia, and has one last wish — to be with his wife and children on Christmas Eve. He promises to turn himself in on December 26, so Luke and Sime decide to honor his wish — but while Sime, Luke, Davey, Zeke, and the others at The Halfway House celebrate Christmas, three bounty hunters posing as lawmen arrive looking for Crawford. Guest appearances: Dick York, Ellen Clark, Denver Pyle, Arthur Batanides, Harry Lauter, Betsy Robinson, Bryan Russell, and Fred Essler.
12	"By the Deep Six"	Donald McDougall	N. B. Stone Jr.	December 27, 1960
Liverpool Jack, an English sailor who jumped ship along with another man in San Francisco, is heading inland as he flees a group of men who killed his companion and burned his remains. Meanwhile, Sime is making a stagecoach run with passengers that include an Irish woman named Molly Moriarty and the Walker family. The Walkers are fleeing an ex-convict named Clyde Hardisty, who is hunting them to seek revenge for Frank Walker's testimony, which put him in prison. The stagecoach encounters Jack on he road and Sime gives him a ride to The Halfway House. Martin — the man in charge of the group pursuing Jack — recruits several men in Timberline including Hardisty to help and then has his men surround The Halfway House. Approaching under a flag of truce, Martin explains to the people in The Halfway House that he is a health official, that Jack was from a ship which had suffered an outbreak of the bubonic plague, that the ship had been blown up, burned, and sunk and its entire crew killed to prevent the spread of the plague, and that Jack and everyone who had come into contact with him, including everyone in The Halfway House, also had to be killed and their bodies burned to contain the disease. Martin then orders his men to shoot anyone attempting to leave The Halfway House. A siege follows, which ends only when a doctor convinces Martin the people at the way station are disease free if they come down with no symptoms by the following day. The Walkers' daughter falls ill, but the doctor diagnoses her ailment as the measles, and the siege is lifted — but Hardisty still is on the scene, intending to wreak his vengeance on the Walkers. Guest appearances: Mort Mills, Ashley Cowan, Walter Sande, Ross Elliott, Catherine McLeod, Joan Elan, Joseph Ruskin, Gina Gillespie, and Thomas B. Henry.
13	"Object: Patrimony"	Thomas Carr	Joe Stone & Paul King	January 3, 1961
A passenger named Duncan is carrying $20,000 in Luke′s stagecoach, but he is stranded at Timberline when Susan McLord, the spoiled daughter of a rich rancher, and her fiancé Lionel Chambers, a weaselly Eastern fortune-hunter, commandeer the stagecoach so they can elope. During the next leg of the run, ex-Confederate States Army Captain Beaumont Butler "Shenandoah" Buell and his three accomplices hold up the stagecoach, intending to steal Duncan's money. Not finding Duncan aboard, they order Luke to proceed to a way station, where they murder the owner and decide to hold Susan hostage after Chambers reveals her father's wealth. Then they murder Chambers as well — and Susan's attitude softens as she and Luke face adversity together and a romantic attraction blossoms between them. Guest appearances: Robert Vaughn, Pippa Scott, Dennis Patrick, Warren M. Oates, Than Wyenn, George Neise, T. M. McBride, Dave Willock, Wally Brown, and Stephen Courtleigh.
14	"Come Home Again"	Don MacDougall	Roy Chanslor	January 10, 1961
Sime and Davey find Deborah Cotton and her daughter Abigail stranded alongside a river. After discovering that they are fleeing a private detective from Cheyenne in the Wyoming Territory named Sam Murdock, who is seeking to apprehend Deborah for kidnapping Abigail, Sime is reluctant to help them because of his responsibilities as a deputy U.S. marshal. Davey insists that Deborah and Abigail are fleeing injustice, not justice, and that in any event they cannot leave a woman and girl alone in the wilderness, so Sime agrees to give them a free ride into Outpost in the stagecoach. After Murdock and his thugs arrive in Outpost, Murchison helps Sime and Davey protect Deborah and Abigail, inviting chorus girls to a saloon and arranging for them to dance with the men and bash them over the head with whiskey bottles on a signal from Sime. Guest appearances: Lisa Kirk, James Coburn, Joyce Jameson, Reba Waters, John Craven, Barbara Hines, and Dick Rich.
15	"The Brass Lily"	Donald McDougall	John Robinson	January 17, 1961
After famous singer Lily de Milo arrives in Outpost for a singing engagement and the community welcomes her, a stray bullet seriously wounds her. As she recovers, the people of Outpost realize that she is foul-tempered and selfish. After her business manager abandons her, only Vernon Mibbs, a patient deaf-mute, tries to tend to her many needs, but she scorns him. Guest appearances: Jean Hagen, Robert Strauss, and Robert J. Wilke.
16	"Finn McCool"	Thomas Carr	Joe Stone & Paul King	January 24, 1961
Finn McCool is an Irishman who is entertaining the patrons of a saloon in Timberline with his dancing when four members of the Irish Republican Brotherhood who have traveled from Ireland to punish him for betraying the Brotherhood drag him outside at gunpoint. He beats up two of them, shoots a third, and escapes. He makes his way to The Halfway House, where Davey takes a liking to him and he tames a horse that had thrown Davey, breaking Davey's arm in the fall. When Sime arrives on the stagecoach, however, he is less certain of McCool's supposed merits. Among Sime's passengers are British Ambassador Robert Allison and his glamorous wife Sybill, and after McCool makes advances on Mrs. Allison and ignores Sime's warnings to leave her alone, the two men have a fistfight refereed by the ambassador. The three surviving Irishmen arrive at The Halfway House and imprison McCool, announcing that they will shoot him at dawn. During the night, Mrs. Allison, who McCool has charmed, slips him a knife so that he can escape. McCool stabs one of the Irishmen, takes Mrs. Allison hostage, and flees, knocking Davey down and inflicting a head injury on him. Sime, Ambassador Allison, and the two remaining Irishmen track down McCool, and a gunfight ensues. Guest appearances: Sean McClory, Hazel Court, John Sutton, Barry Kelley, Dan Sheridan, and Denny Mille.
17	"Image of a Man"	Donald McDougall	Frederick J. Lipp	January 31, 1961
In 1871, Luke's stagecoach pulls into the town of Riverton, which is controlled by a corrupt town boss named Henchard and where the townspeople have pulled down a statue of Lady Justice. Luke becomes deeply concerned with the rehabilitation of a broken-down, once-great judge, Ethan Blount. With Luke's help, Blount achieves redemption, but Henchard has him killed by a hired gunman named Cord — and Luke then prevails upon the timid people of Riverton to do the right thing. Guest appearances: Thomas Mitchell, John Milford, DeForest Kelley, Dabbs Greer, Regis Toomey, Robert Brubaker, J. Edward McKinley, and John Dehner.
18	"Not in Our Stars"	Thomas Carr	Joe Stone & Paul King	February 7, 1961
Aaron Sutter and his three sons arrive in Timberline looking for Ben Waits, a former bond-servant of Sutter′s who had tried to render medical help to Sutter's daughter. She died, and Sutter claims a right to kill Wait for his failure to save the girl. The Sutters attempt to force Luke to find Wait and turn him over, angering Luke. After the stagecoach reaches The Halfway House, Waits arrives there as well on a horse he took from Timberline. When a girl who is a passenger on the stagecoach suffers a rattlesnake bite and is in danger of dying, Wait saves her life. The Sutters then arrive and besiege The Halfway House, demanding that Wait be handed over to them so they can horsewhip and hang them. Guest appearances: Jay C. Flippen, Lon Chaney Jr., Whit Bissell, J. Edward McKinley, Stanja Lowe, Hampton Fancher, Karen Green, Paul W. Carr, and Skip Ward.
19	"The Arsonist"	Donald McDougall	D.D. Beauchamp & Mary M. Beauchamp	February 14, 1961
Jethro Burke has been a bookkeeper for over 20 years at a paint factory. Although the factory is going bankrupt, Burke nonetheless receives a $5,000 bonus from his kindly old employer. Jethro leaves a candle burning that will set fire to the factory and burn it down so that the owner can collect the insurance money. Unknown to Burke, however, his wife Sally and a man named Jack Craig want to steal what they believe to be a large of amount of money in the factory's safe, so Craig murders the factory owner and, after finding no money in the safe, sets the factory on fire before the candle burns down. The Burkes and Craig then take the stagecoach together, with Sally and Craig planning to steal the $5,000 bonus from Jethro. To prove to himself that he did not burn down the factory, Jethro lights a candle in the timberland during the journey, igniting a large forest fire, and Luke, Sime, and Davey face the challenge of getting their passengers to safety. Guest appearances: James Dunn, James Best, and Adele Mara.
20	"Songs My Mother Taught Me"	Donald McDougall	Kay Lenard & Jess Charneol	February 21, 1961
Matt Dexter is a panhandler who witnesses a cold-blooded murder and flees when the murderers see him and decide to kill him so that he cannot testify against them. He arrives in Outpost and secretly befriends Davey, with whom he shares a common love of playing the harmonica. Davey sneaks food to him, making Sime suspicious about the amount of food that is missing. The murderers eventually arrive in Outpost and threaten to shoot Davey's dog Hannibal II, culminating in a gunfight by the river. Guest appearances: Arthur O'Connell, Richard Devon, Harry Lauter, Jean Howell, and John Damler.
21	"The Root of Evil"	Thomas Carr	N. B. Stone Jr.	February 28, 1961
Ex-United States Army Major Ralph Barnes arrives in Timberline on his honeymoon with his wife Cecilia, claiming to be on secret Army orders and that a group of thieves is pursuing him, one of whom he shoots with a pocket pistol. He and Cecilia then board a stagecoach with Sime at the reins. After picking up a Scottish trapper and prospector named Sandy Campbell along the way, the stagecoach stops at The Halfway House, where ex-U.S. Army Captain Jackson Lee joins them. Luke also arrives by buckboard with the glamorous Stella Smith, who had asked him to drive her there so that she could meet her fiancé, Captain Lee. Campbell drops his Scottish accent and reveals himself to be a colonel from the United States Department of War, and it becomes apparent to Sime and Luke that all of the people who have gathered at The Halfway House are interested in getting their hands on a stolen U.S. Army payroll. Guest appearances: Philip Carey, Rachel Ames, Linda Lawson, Don Haggerty, Bob Bice, and John Dehner.
22	"The Outcasts"	Donald McDougall	Martin Berkeley	March 7, 1961
After killing a bank robber in Dodge City, Kansas, and subsequently finding out the dead man was his own brother, Deputy Sheriff Ken Rawlins decides he has had enough of guns and killing and turns in his badge and gun. Zeke hires him to work at The Halfway House, where he befriends Davey. At The Halfway House, a mail-order bride from back East named Cora Temple arrives and discovers that her intended husband has died in an accident but receives a proposal from Timberline's widowed gunsmith Hal Franklin, and another woman named Ruby Sanders becomes disappointed in her lover Mack Knowles. As these stories of romance play out, Rawlins's past eventually catches up with him. Guest appearances: Don Dubbins, Joanna Barnes, Lyle Talbot, Hollis Irving, Gordon Jones, and Stacy Harris.
23	"The Remounts"	Thomas Carr	D.D. Beauchamp & Mary M. Beauchamp	March 14, 1961
After rounding up some mustangs to sell to the U.S. Army, horse herders Clete Henry and Hutch Barnett hire two men known as Griz and Cowboy to help with the herd, not knowing that Griz and Cowboy are part of a criminal gang run by a man named Hody. Griz and Cowboy take over the herd and hand it over to Hody, whose gang kills three United States Cavalrymen who try to buy the horses, then dons their uniforms, planning to keep the money the murdered soldiers had brought and sell the horses, thus increasing their profits. When the stagecoach happens by, Griz and Cowboy take Davey and Hannibal II hostage and force Luke to put on a cavalry uniform and Sime to drive the horses. Luke, Sime, Clete, and Hitch have to overcome Hody′s gang and then free Davey and Hannibal II from Griz and Cowboy. Guest appearances: James Beck, Don Burnett, Mort Mills, Richard Devon, James Griffith, Chris Alcaide, Jackie Russell, Lester Dorr, and Don Harvey.
24	"House of Violence"	Donald McDougall	Stephen Lord	March 21, 1961
Russ Doty — a killer and robber wanted in half the territories in the West — and two accomplices rob the stagecoach line's safe of a payroll the line had been hired to carry, shooting and wounding Cal in the process, then ride to a way station where the stagecoach has stopped with Luke, Sime, Davey, and their passengers aboard. They take everyone hostage, then send Luke into Timberline for repairs, warning him that they will kill the hostages if he tells anyone where they are. Luke nonetheless confides in Marshall Strickland, who convinces him that Doty plans to kill everyone anyway and that the only way to save the hostages is to return to the way station with a large posse. The posse heads to the way station and confronts Doty and his gang. Guest appearances: Jack Lord, Marion Ross, George Keymas, Peter Leeds, Grandon Rhodes, and Charles Horvath.
25	"The Butcher"	Thomas Carr	Joe Stone & Paul King	March 28, 1961
With Sime at the reins and Davey along for the ride, the stagecoach heads eastward carrying Colonel Sam Carlin, a U.S. Army colonel suffering from post-traumatic stress disorder who is known to Mexicans as El Carnicero ("The Butcher") for his harsh rule in California, where he is known for frequently hanging Spanish-speaking people; Carlin is headed to Washington, D.C., to answer charges that his use of the death penalty has been excessive. The other passengers on the stagecoach are Johnny Dane, an outlaw in chains; Sheriff Doolin, who is escorting Dane; a glamorous woman; and a Shakespearean actor. A gang of Mexican bandits led by a ruthless man named Domingo block the road and stop the stagecoach, demanding that Sime hand over Carlin so that his gang can kill him. Sime refuses, and Domingo's gang kills Doolin and drives everyone else aboard the stagecoach off the road and into the scrubland. Continually harried by Domingo's gang, Sime, Davey, and the survuving passengers head for the nearest way station on foot. Along the way, Carlin digs a bullet out of Sime's shoulder and ultimately Dane shoots it out with Domingo's men. Guest appearances: Jack Lord, Christopher Dark, Dody Heath, Frank Ferguson, Rodolfo Hoyos, Than Wyenn, and John Dehner.
26	"Fort Wyatt Crossing"	Donald McDougall	Robert Sherman	April 4, 1961
After suffering a wound in a dispute with Indians, U.S. Army soldier Julian Tibbs crashes his wagon — which is carrying $190,000 in gold — and passes out across the road. Driving the stagecoach with passengers aboard bound for Albuquerque in the New Mexico Territory, Luke happens upon him and treats his wounds. Luke and the passengers load him and the gold aboard the stagecoach and the stagecoach heads for Fort Wyatt to drop off Tibbs and the gold. Along the way, the stagecoach encounters a U.S. Cavalry patrol made up of Captain Eli and two troopers, who proceed to hijack the stagecoach at gunpoint and kill one of the passengers and a number of pursuing Digger Indians. Guest appearances: Lawrence Dobkin, Madlyn Rhue, Alvy Moore, Steve Terrell, Warren M. Oates, and Mike Ragan.
27	"A Place of Still Waters"	Harry Harris Jr.	Frederick J. Lipp	April 11, 1961
Gunman Pierce "Red" Martin is known for his quick draw. He is weary of gun fighting, but is forced to kill a young man who challenges him to a gunfight. Although he killed in self-defense, he is wanted for murder, and he flees to Outpost to seek out the Reverend Jim Hallett, an old friend of his from the Union Army who he had helped survive imprisonment in Andersonville Prison during the American Civil War. When Martin arrives in Outpost, he learns that Hallett is away visiting the sick. When Hallett returns, he is torn between an obligation he feels to help Martin and the dictate of conscience that he follow the law. The townspeople of Outpost want to capture Martin and turn him in. Sime disagrees, arguing that the townspeople are only out for the bounty, which is especially true of townsmen Sam and Matt. Eventually, Sam and Matt wind up as hostages in Outpost′s saloon. Guest appearances: Darren McGavin, Stafford Repp, Tom Gilson, Burt Douglas, Chuck Roberson (billed as "Chuck Robertson," Lane Chandler, and Edward Binns.
28	"Never Walk Alone"	George Blair	D.D. Beauchamp & Mary M. Beauchamp	April 18, 1961
After the governor of the Wyoming Territory pardons him, train robber Cole Eldridge is released from prison and boards a train, He finds a member of his old gang, Lin Hyatt, aboard the train. Hyatt and a member of his gang named Fargo rob the train, Fargo murdering the railroad clerk in cold blood during the process, and frame Eldridge for the crime. Cole writes to Luke, a friend of his from their days together in the Confederate States Army during the American Civil War, to ask for help. Luke travels to Lander, where he meets Cole's girlfriend Ruby Walker, and they agree to join forces to help Cole. They meet Cole in the small town of Deep Well, and when Cole and Luke ride off together, Hyatt and his gang pursue and surprise them — leaving it up to Ruby to save them. Guest appearances: William Campbell, Karen Sharpe, Lee Van Cleef, Claire Carleton, Alan Wells, Bing Russell, Ken Becker, Bob Morgan, Peter Brocco, Wally Vernon, Frank Kreig, and Cliff Fields.
29	"The Big Gun"	Donald McDougall	N. B. Stone Jr.	April 25, 1961
While Luke is carrying a Gatling gun in his stagecoach for delivery to the United States Army post at Fort Benson in the Montana Territory, a band of Mexican revolutionaries, intercepts him to capture the gun for use in Mexico by the forces of Benito Juárez against those of Emperor of Mexico Maximilian I. The band is led by Mexican Colonel Francisco Martinez and includes three thugs, two Mexican women, and an embittered former U.S. Army soldier who is a psychopathic killer. The gang hijacks the stagecoach and orders Luke to drive it to Mexico, but Luke sabotages the stagecoach′s kingpin so that it cannot make the journey. A gunfight ensues in which the Gatling gun plays a role. Guest appearances: Cesar Romero, DeForest Kelley, Barbara Luna, Jonathan Bolt, Gale Garnett, Bing Russell, and Hal Baylor.
30	"The Dead Don't Cry"	George Blair	Martin Berkeley	May 2, 1961
Luke travels to Tucson in the Arizona Territory to purchase a new stagecoach. When he arrives there, he finds that his brother Sam is on the run from the law in the area after the U.S. marshal in Tucson jumped to conclusions and charged him with a robbery and murder he did not commit. The marshal drops the charges and gives Sam an official letter proclaiming his innocence to anyone who tries to arrest him. The greedy bounty hunter Mike Pardee remains on the hunt for Sam, however, so Luke tracks him down and shows him the letter, which Pardee refuses to believe. Braving an attack by Apaches along the way, they ride together to the town of Vega to get further proof of Sam's innocence, but the corrupt sheriff in Vega is a friend of Pardee's and locks Luke up while Pardee rides off in search of Sam. Luke must make a daring escape and ride hard to stop Pardee and save Sam. Guest appearances: James Best, Tod Lasswell, King Calder, Harry Lauter, and Mary Tyler Moore.
31	"The Raider"	Thomas Carr	D.D. Beauchamp & Mary M. Beauchamp	May 9, 1961
Mel Harney, a "stock detective" — a gunman hired by ranchers to kill homesteaders during a range war — brutally murders homesteader Tom Coogan and then steals a calf from Coogan's farm and heads to The Halfway House, where Zeke believes he has seen him before and takes a dislike to him. Meanwhile, Coogan's partner Gil Soames finds Coogan's body, buries it, and then prepares to head for The Halfway House himself, where he plans to meet Emily Prince, his mail-order bride from back East. The stagecoach later arrives with Sime driving and Davey and Emily aboard. Soames is scheduled to arrive by buckboard the following day, and Harney's plan is to kill him and plant the stolen calf with his body to make it look like he was a cattle rustler. In a climactic shootout, Davey participates actively and proves handy with a rifle. Guest appearances: Henry Silva, Jan Shepherd, James Lydon, William Phipps, and Norman Leavitt.
32	"Blind Man's Bluff"	Thomas Carr	William D. Powell	May 16, 1961
A blind gunfighter named Stace arrives in Outpost with his dog, impressing Davey even though Hannibal II does not get along with the other dog. Sime warns Davey to keep away from Stace because he is a dangerous killer, and in fact Stace is in Outpost for a murderous purpose: He seeks revenge against his ex-lover Della, who ran off with and married piano player Harmony Bell — and the couple also has arrived in Outpost. Guest appearances: James Drury, Ruta Lee, Whit Bissell, Dabbs Greer, Lloyd Kino, Tyler McVey, Dave Willock, Robert G. Anderson, and Charles Horvath.
33	"The Bold Whip"	Donald McDougall	Kenneth Gamet	May 23, 1961
Luke, Sime, and Davey are pioneering a new stagecoach route from Outpost to the U.S. Army post at Fort Tremaine, with a stop at The Halfway House. On the first trip on the new route, they are carrying a large payroll for the fort, and among their passengers is a man calling himself Stokes, but Luke eventually recognizes him as Rupe Larned, who had killed a stagecoach-driver friend of his in Kansas. On the road, they encounter Little Fox, a young Sioux boy who warns them that renegade Cheyenne are in the area. When the Cheyenne attack, everyone on the stagecoach takes refuge in a building, and just as they run low on ammunition, the United States Cavalry arrives and drives off the Cheyenne — and Little Fox identifies Larned as the man who sold the Cheyenne Winchester rifles. Guest appearances: John Kellogg, Carolyn Kearney, Eugene Martin, James Beck, John Damler, and Mike Mason.
34	"The Orphans"	Thomas Carr	D.D. Beauchamp & Mary M. Beauchamp	May 30, 1961
After Hogan — a gunman hired by a cattle rancher to attack shepherds during a range war — murders Basque shepherd Manolo as he tends his sheep, Manolo's orphaned children Jaime and Angela arrive in Timberline aboard the stagecoach. While Davey drives the stagecoach to The Halfway House with Angela aboard, Luke and Sime decide to herd the late Manolo's sheep. Hogan and two of his men attack them, and Luke and Sime employ the tactical skills they learned as soldiers during the American Civil War in the gun battle that follows. Guest appearances: Robert Cabal, Linda Dangcil, John Milford, Joe Perry, Alan Wells, and Raoul DeLeon.
35	"The Guardian Angels"	Donald McDougall	Bob Barbash	June 6, 1961
Luke and Davey head out on the stagecoach with the disgraced marshal of Timberline riding shotgun and carrying three passengers – a conman who poses as a preacher to get money from the gullible, a gambler run out of town after he was caught cheating, and an arrogant snob from the East. When they arrive at The Halfway House, they find that Zeke has hurt his back and a disagreeable and lazy man named Sam Jason is running the way station while Zeke recovers. When a group of renegade Indians seeking to steal a large amount of cash Luke and Davey are transporting aboard the stagecoach besieges The Halfway House, Luke and Davey must rely on the questionable support of Jason and men aboard the stagecoach to help them defend the place. Guest appearances: Steve Brodie, Malcolm Atterbury, Casey Adams, Harry Lauter, Walter Kinsella, Michael Fox, Thomas B. Henry, and Robert Foulk.
36	"The Swindler"	Thomas Carr	Herman Epstein	June 13, 1961
A gang of con men led by Hollis Collier arrives in Outpost intending to swindle the townspeople by getting them to invest in a fake gold mine. Luke, Sime, and Davey do not trust them, although they cannot help but like the charismatic Collier. However, greed drives the gullible townspeople to believe Collier and his associates — but as the scheme plays out, the con men begin to turn on one another. Guest appearances: Dennis Patrick, Jean Willes, Adam Williams, Chris Alcaide, Charles Horvath, and Wally Brown.
37	"The Renegades"	Donald McDougall	Frank L. Moss	June 20, 1961
Five United States Army soldiers led by two men about to face a firing squad break out of the guardhouse of a fort, murdering guards as they do, and head for Canada. They arrive at The Halfway House while the stagecoach is there, shoot and wound Zeke, and force Luke and Sime to drive them to Canada. Luke and Sime believe that the gang will murder them after reaching Canada, and they try to sow dissension among their captors and slow down the trip to give a pursuing Army force time to catch up with the stagecoach. Guest appearances: Richard Devon, Warren Oates, Ed Kemmer, Tristram Coffin, Paul Carr, Hal Baylor, Lane Bradford, Dick Rich, and John Damler.
38	"The Marker"	Thomas Carr	Mary M. Beauchamp	June 27, 1961
Luke falls for Jenny Forbes, a saloon girl in Colorado, helps her escape from her cruel boss, Mingo, by stowing her away in his stagecoach, and gets her a job as a cook at The Halfway House. When Mingo finds out what happened, he sends Luke a grave marker with Luke's name and the date June 18 on it. He then heads for the Wyoming Territory with two henchmen, and during a violent storm they close in on The Halfway House. Guest appearances: Ruta Lee and Mort Mills.
