= Ransom! =

1956 film by Alex Segal

- Theatrical release poster
- Directed by: Alex Segal
- Screenplay by: Cyril Hume; Richard Maibaum
- Based on: Fearful Decision; 1954 TV play by Cyril Hume; Richard Maibaum
- Produced by: Nicholas Nayfack
- Starring: Glenn Ford; Donna Reed; Leslie Nielsen; Juano Hernandez; Robert Keith
- Cinematography: Arthur E. Arling
- Edited by: Ferris Webster
- Music by: Jeff Alexander
- Production company: Metro-Goldwyn-Mayer
- Distributed by: Loew's Inc.
- Release date: January 24, 1956
- Running time: 102 minutes
- Country: United States
- Language: English
- Budget: $1,003,000
- Box office: $2,172,000

Ransom! is a 1956 American crime drama film about the kidnapping of the son of a wealthy couple. Written by Richard Maibaum and Cyril Hume, the film is based on a popular 1954 episode of The United States Steel Hour titled "Fearful Decision" starring Ralph Bellamy.

Directed by stage and television veteran Alex Segal, the film stars Glenn Ford, Donna Reed and Leslie Nielsen.

The 1996 film Ransom, directed by Ron Howard and starring Mel Gibson, was loosely based on Ransom!.

== Plot ==
Young Andy Stannard is the son of wealthy executive father Dave Stannard and mother Edith. Andy's school principal calls to inform the Stannards that the family doctor's nurse has collected Andy from school with an infection. Dave contacts the doctor and is told that the doctor had not requested to retrieve Andy. Dave realizes that Andy has been kidnapped and calls the police.

Police chief Jim Backett organizes a search and has an additional telephone line installed in the Stannards' house in order to keep the main line free should the kidnappers call with a ransom demand. Newspaper reporter Charlie Telfer enters the house and meets hostile resistance from Dave but is allowed to remain.

When the principal of Andy's school arrives and demands not to be held responsible for Andy's abduction, Edith attacks her with a fire poker. The doctor sedates Edith, and she is asleep upstairs when the kidnapper finally calls. The kidnapper demands a $500,000 ransom and instructs Dave to signal his intention to pay by having a popular television host wear a white jacket on the next evening's broadcast. The police trace the phone call to a phone booth and arrive in time to find the kidnapper's cigarette still burning.

With his brother and business partner Al, Dave collects the ransom money. Telfer explains that even if Dave pays the ransom, there is no guarantee that Andy will be returned alive, as he is evidence of the kidnapper's crime, and that Andy's fate will be the same regardless of what Dave decides to do. Backett expresses his wish that families would not pay ransoms, because assenting to kidnappers' demands encourages more kidnappings.

The next day, instead of following the kidnapper's plan, Dave appears on the designated television show with the $500,000 spread on the table before him. He angrily announces that he will not pay the ransom but that it will be offered as a reward to anyone who captures the kidnapper if Andy is killed.

Worried because it appears as though he had advised Dave to refuse the ransom, Backett requests a letter from Dave absolving him of any responsibility for the decision. When Edith discovers that Dave has refused to pay, she becomes furious and must be restrained before she is eventually removed from the house.

The next day, Backett presents Dave with Andy's bloody T-shirt that had been discovered behind a seat in a stolen car. Convinced that his son is dead, Dave presses his lawyer to arrange a trust that will pay the ransom money as a bounty to anyone who locates the kidnapper. Dave retreats to the backyard and sits next to a fort that Andy had been building with his friends. He begins weeping but Andy suddenly appears and Dave is overjoyed. Andy tells him that the shirt was bloodied when he had bitten the kidnapper who had posed as a nurse. The family is reunited in an embrace as the butler thanks God.

== Cast ==
- Glenn Ford as Dave Stannard
- Donna Reed as Edith Stannard
- Leslie Nielsen as Charlie Telfer
- Juano Hernandez as Jesse Chapman
- Robert Keith as Police Chief Backett
- Richard Gaines as Langly
- Mabel Albertson as Mrs. Partridge
- Alexander Scourby as Dr. Gorman
- Bobby Clark as Andy Stannard
- Ainslie Pryor as Al Stannard
- Lori March as Elizabeth Stannard
- Robert Burton as Sheriff Kessing
- Juanita Moore as Shirley Lorraine
- Charles Herbert as Butchie Ritter
- Ethan Laidlaw as Townsman (uncredited)
- Olan Soule as Bank Clerk (uncredited)

== Production ==
The film was based on a television play by Richard Maibaum and Cyril Hume which Maibaum called "probably the best thing Cyril and I ever did." They turned it into a stage play which was not produced, but the television play sold to MGM for $85,000. Maibaum and Hume wrote the script. Maibaum felt Glenn Ford "was not as effective as Ralph Bellamy had been on television" and Alex Segal's direction was not as effective because he directed it with too much intensity. "As a result, just when the story should have gripped you the most, the audience was emotionally depleted. Although I thought it was a good film, I wasn’t as fond of it as of the TV show."

== Reception ==
According to MGM records, the film earned $1,224,000 in the U.S. and Canada and $948,000 elsewhere, resulting in a profit of $336,000.

== See also ==
- List of American films of 1956
- King's Ransom
