= Johnny Rocco =

1958 film by Paul Landres

- American cinema poster
- Directed by: Paul Landres
- Written by: James O'Hanlon; Samuel Roeca
- Story by: Richard Carlson
- Produced by: Scott R. Dunlap
- Starring: Richard Eyer; Stephen McNally; Coleen Gray
- Cinematography: William Margulies
- Edited by: George White
- Music by: Edward J. Kay
- Production company: Scott R. Dublap Productions
- Distributed by: Allied Artists Pictures
- Release date: December 21, 1958 (United States)
- Running time: 84 minutes
- Country: United States
- Language: English

Johnny Rocco is a 1958 American crime film noir directed by Paul Landres starring Richard Eyer, Stephen McNally, and Coleen Gray.

== Plot ==
Young Johnny Rocco (Richard Eyer) is disturbed after seeing his gangster father Tony (Stephen McNally) involved in a murder. The gang, fearing young Johnny might tip the police, decide to silence both him and his father. Frightened, Johnny seeks help from schoolteacher Miss Mayfield (Coleen Gray) and gets some help from Father Regan (Leslie Bradley) and police detective Garron (Russ Conway) before his father has a final showdown with the gang.

== Cast ==
Main cast includes:

- Richard Eyer as Johnny Rocco
- Stephen McNally as Tony Rocco
- Coleen Gray as Lois Mayfield, Teacher
- Russ Conway as Police Lt. Fred Garron
- Leslie Bradley as Father Regan
- James Flavin as Mooney
- Matty Fain as Dino

and includes appearances by:

- William Bakewell as Joe the Police Scientist
- Ralph Brooks as Father
- Carey Loftin as Motorcycle Cop
- Frank Wilcox as Gordon Lane
- Robert Mitchell as Choir Leader
- John Mitchum as Police Detective at Stakeout
- Thomas Browne Henry as Principal Farrington

== Production ==
Filming locations included Zoo Drive.

== Releases ==
The film was first released by Allied Artists theatrically in the United States in December 1958. It had European releases as Rauschgiftschmuggler und Gangster in Austria, as Im Dschungel der Großstadt in West Germany in 1960, and as Det lille vidne in Denmark in 1962. Its other language titles include A Morte Selou Seus Lábios for Brazil, Ego eida ton dolofono for Greece, and Il riscatto di un gangster for Italy.
