= Kronos (film) =

1957 film by Kurt Neumann

- Theatrical release poster
- Directed by: Kurt Neumann
- Screenplay by: Lawrence L. Goldman
- Story by: Irving Block
- Produced by: Irving Block; Louis DeWitt; Kurt Neumann; Jack Rabin
- Starring: Jeff Morrow; Barbara Lawrence; John Emery; George O'Hanlon
- Cinematography: Karl Struss
- Edited by: Jodie Copelan
- Music by: Paul Sawtell; Bert Shefter
- Production company: Regal Films
- Distributed by: 20th Century-Fox
- Release date: April 1957 (United States)
- Running time: 78 minutes
- Country: United States
- Language: English
- Budget: $160,000 (estimated)

Kronos (a.k.a. Kronos, Destroyer of the Universe or Kronos, Ravager of Planets) is a 1957 American black-and-white science fiction film from Regal Films, a division of 20th Century-Fox. It was produced by Irving Block, Louis DeWitt, Kurt Neumann, and Jack Rabin, directed by Kurt Neumann, and stars Jeff Morrow and Barbara Lawrence. Kronos was distributed as a double feature with She Devil.

Since the film's release, it has been widely praised for its above-average storyline and its farsighted portrayal of the consequences of over-consumption of both natural and man-made resources; it has achieved minor cult status as a result.

== Plot ==
A huge, blinking flying object from space emits a glowing ball of electrical energy, which races toward the Earth. It intercepts a man driving on an isolated road in the American Southwest desert late at night. It takes over the man's mind, directing him to LabCentral, a U.S. research facility, where a pair of scientists have been tracking the flying object. The possessed man knocks out a security guard, then proceeds into the main building where the entity leaves the driver and enters the mind of Dr. Hubbell Eliot, the LabCentral chief.

Meanwhile, in a research lab below, astrophysicist Dr. Leslie Gaskell and his computer science associate, Dr. Arnold Culver, have been tracking the flying object. They realize that it is not only headed toward Earth but is moving under intelligent guidance. Attempts to destroy with nuclear missiles fail, and the object dives into the Pacific Ocean off the coast of Mexico.

The two scientists, along with Vera Hunter, LabCentral's staff photographer and Gaskell's girlfriend, rush to Mexico. Upon their arrival, they at first see nothing, but later that night, they see an enormous glowing dome appear on the ocean horizon. The next morning, on the beach outside their room, they find that a very tall machine has appeared; its four-legged body has two mobile antennae. They use a helicopter to land atop the machine, glimpsing its complex inner workings before being forced to leave and fly back to LabCentral when the machine begins to move.

The possessed Dr. Eliot telepathically directs the machine. Now named Kronos by one of the scientists, it methodically attacks power plants in Mexico, draining all their energy. In doing so, Kronos grows larger, consuming more power as it moves from one power source to the next. Four Mexican Air Force fighter planes attack, but the ever-growing alien machine easily destroys them and continues on its rampage. While Kronos is absorbing energy, Eliot is momentarily freed from the influence of the force controlling him. Eliot tells his colleagues that Kronos is an energy accumulator, sent by an alien race that has exhausted its own natural resources to drain all the Earth's power and then return it to their dying world.

On Eliot's recommendation, the United States Air Force sends a B-47 bomber to drop a hydrogen bomb on Kronos. Gaskell warns the Air Force general in charge that an atomic explosion will simply supply the alien machine with more energy. The general attempts to abort the mission, but Kronos, aware of the plan by way of Dr. Eliot's mind, magnetically draws the jet to crash into it, absorbing the bomb's nuclear blast. The alien machine, now grown to an immense size, appears unstoppable, harvesting all forms of energy at will.

In another uncontrolled moment, Dr. Eliot locks himself in an hermetically sealed room, trapping himself and the energy force. As Kronos draws near Los Angeles, Gaskell realizes that reversing the machine's polarity will force it to feed upon itself, until it implodes. Gaskell, Culver, and Vera convince the Air Force to bombard Kronos with nuclear ions, which will cause the polarity to reverse. Kronos is obliterated in the resulting implosion.

== Cast ==
- Jeff Morrow as Dr. Leslie Gaskell
- Barbara Lawrence as Vera Hunter
- George O'Hanlon as Dr. Arnold Culver
- John Emery as Dr. Hubbell Eliot
- Morris Ankrum as Dr. Albert Stern
- Kenneth Alton as The Pickup Driver (Script name: McCrary)
- Jose Gonzales-Gonzales as Manuel Ramirez
- John Halloran as Lab Central Security Guard
- John Parrish as Gen. Perry
- Marjorie Stapp as The Nurse
- Robert Shayne as Air Force General
- Rosa Turich as Senora Ramirez
- Don Eitner as USAF Meteorology Sergeant
- Ron Kennedy as USAF Control Tower Sergeant
- Gordon Mills as A Sergeant
- Richard Harrison as A Pilot

== Production ==
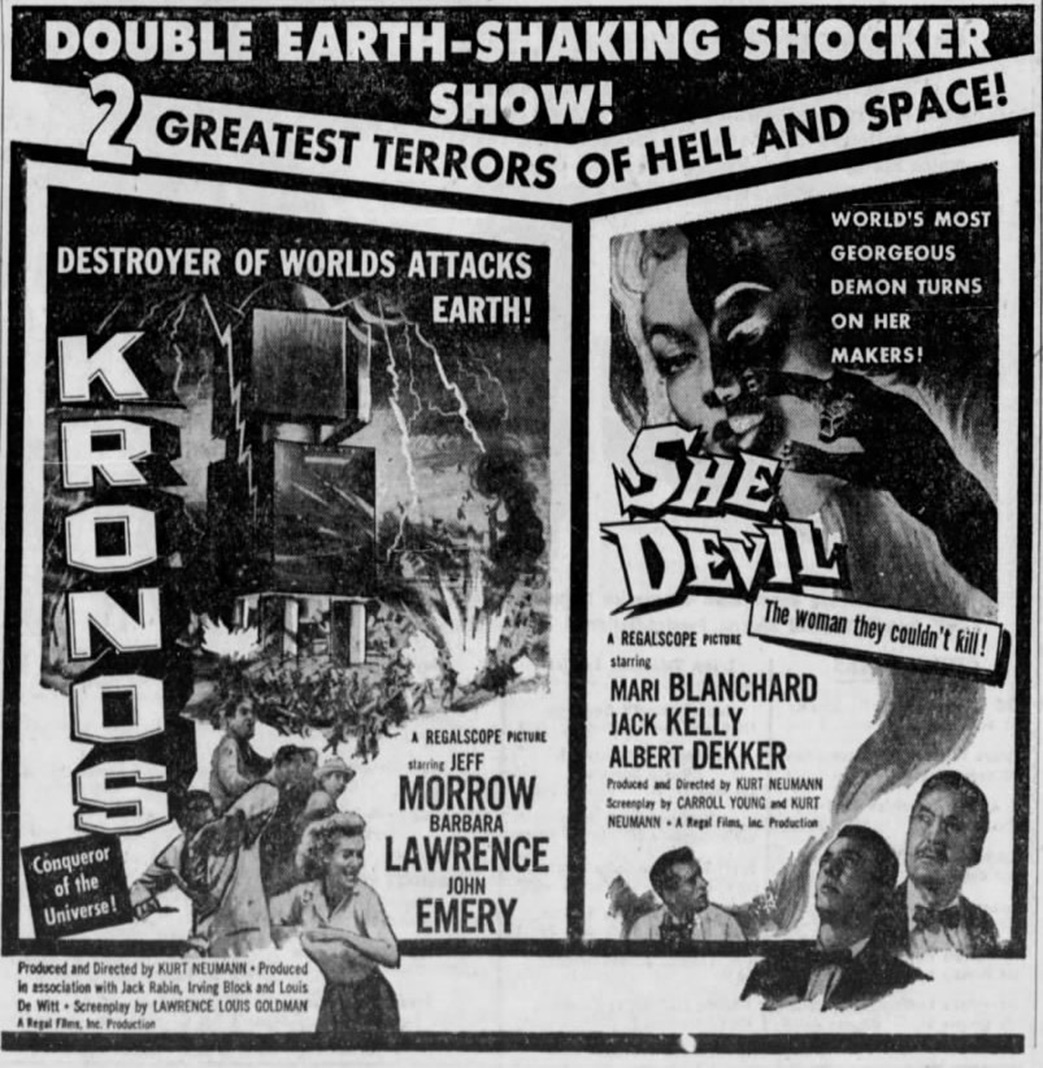
Advertisement from 1957 for Kronos and co-feature, She Devil

Kronos was filmed in a little more than two weeks (mid-January to late January 1957) in California; special effects were created by Jack Rabin, Irving Block, and Louis DeWitt.

The idea of an alien machine absorbing energy is similar to the giant alien machine from the later (1966) Star Trek television episode "The Doomsday Machine" which destroys planets and uses them to fuel itself.

George O'Hanlon, who plays Dr. Arnold Culver in the film, had just finished his popular series of Joe McDoakes comedy shorts and would be later known as the voice of George Jetson in the popular cartoon series The Jetsons.

== Reception ==
When the film was first released in 1957, Variety gave the film a favorable review: "Kronos is a well-made, moderate budget science-fictioner which boasts quality special effects that would do credit to a much higher-budgeted film ... John Emery is convincing as the lab head forced by the outer-space intelligence to direct the monster. Barbara Lawrence is in strictly for distaff interest, but pretty".

Film critic Dennis Schwartz was disappointed in the film's screenplay and acting. He wrote, "German emigre to Hollywood, Kurt Neumann (Tarzan and the Amazons/Son of Ali Baba/She Devil), directs this b/w shot, dull, so-so sci-fi film, that's played straight-forward, is humorless and all the thespians are wooden. It's based on the story by Irving Block and the weak script is written by Lawrence Louis Goldman".

== See also ==
- List of American films of 1957
