= Jonathan Odell =

American poet (1737–1818)

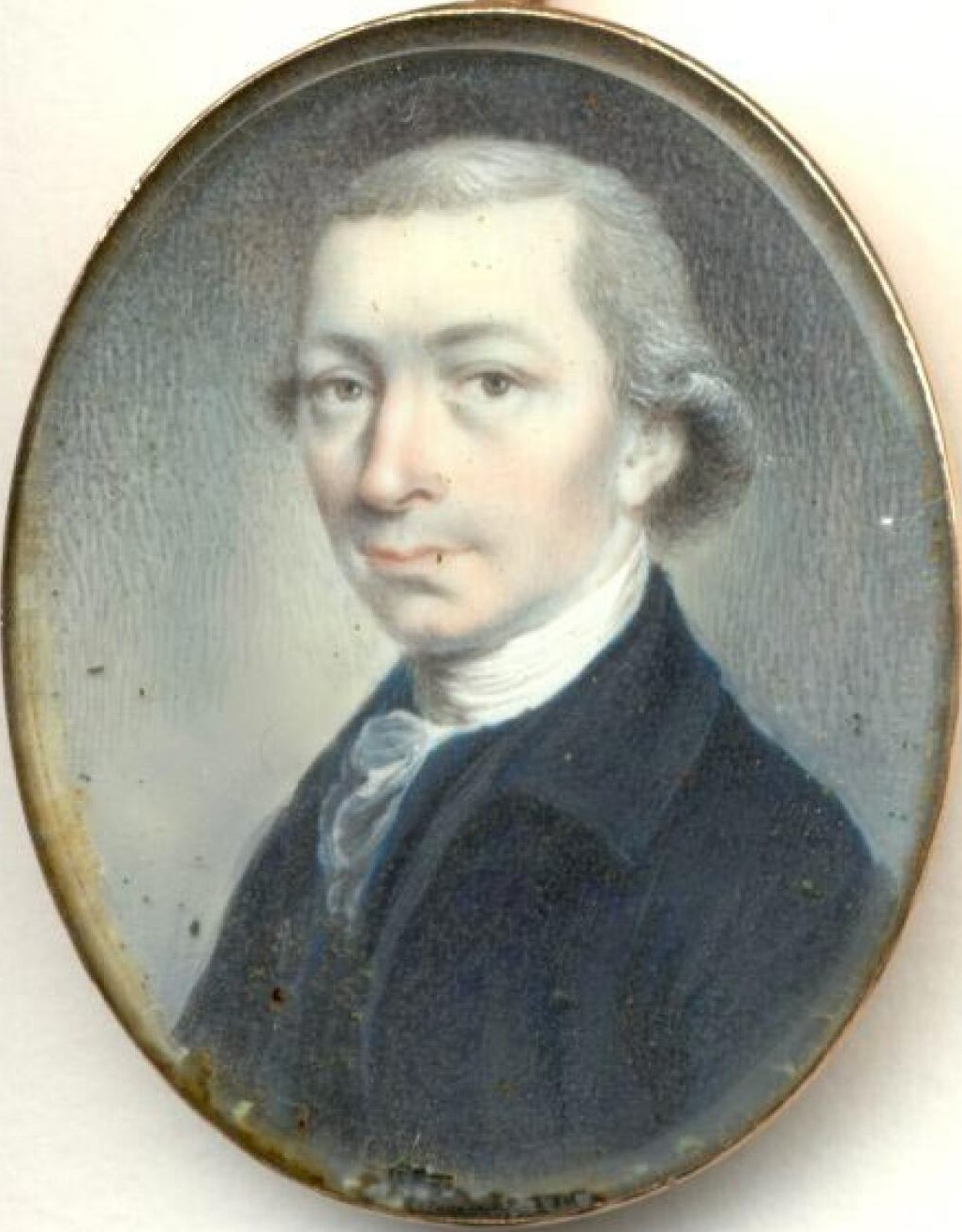
- Watercolor on ivory portrait of Odell
- Born: September 25, 1737; Newark, New Jersey
- Died: November 25, 1818 (aged 81); Fredericton, New Brunswick
- Occupations: Poet, Parish Priest at Burlington and Mount Holly, Loyalist during the American Revolution

Jonathan Odell (25 September 1737 – 25 November 1818) was a Loyalist poet who lived during the American Revolution.

== Early life and career ==
Odell was born in the city of Newark in New Jersey on September 25, 1737. He was the only son of John Odell, a descendant of Puritan migrant William Odell, who immigrated from England to Massachusetts in 1639. His mother, Temperance Dickinson, was the daughter of Reverend Jonathan Dickinson, co-founder and first president of the College of New Jersey, which later became Princeton University.

He graduated from the College of New Jersey in 1754. Odell then briefly taught at a grammar school attached to the college from 1755 to 1756. Although he had studied medicine, instead of becoming a doctor he joined the Church of England ministry. As a minister he preached at parish priest at Burlington and Mount Holly, both in New Jersey. He was inducted into the revived American Philosophical Society in 1768.

== The American Revolution ==
When the revolution broke out Odell became a strong loyalist and wrote poetry promoting the loyalist cause. He was brought before the New Jersey Provincial Congress for such actions and on July 20, 1776, he was ordered to sign a loyalty oath and remain within eight miles of the Burlington County courthouse. In December of that year, he fled to New York, with the help of local citizens, and served as an administrator and satiric poet-propagandist for the British. After the war in 1784 he emigrated to New Brunswick, Canada, where he received the post of provincial secretary as a reward for his loyalty. He remained in New Brunswick and died in Fredericton.

His daughter Lucy Anne is buried in the Old Burying Ground (Halifax, Nova Scotia).

Odell was portrayed by George Sanders as a highly intelligent but cynical loyalist in the 1955 Hollywood film The Scarlet Coat.
