= Joey Fallon =

American child actor (1946–1958) and politician

- Born: Joseph A. Fallon; December 24, 1941; New York City, US
- Died: November 17, 1993 (aged 52); New York City, US
- Other names: Joseph Fallon, Joe Fallon
- Education: Fordham Preparatory School; Georgetown University; Brooklyn Law School
- Occupations: Actor; attorney
- Years active: 1948–1955; 1963–1983
- Partner: Ann Phillips

Joey Fallon (born Joseph A. Fallon; December 24, 1941 – November 17, 1993), sometimes billed as Joseph Fallon, was an American child actor in television, theater, radio, and film, and—at various times—an attorney, a Democratic district leader in Manhattan, an assistant to New York City Mayor John Lindsay, and campaign director for the then would-be New York State lieutenant governor, Mario Cuomo.

== Early life and career ==
A Bronx native, Fallon was the son of Irish immigrants Michael Fallon and Mary O'Connor. He began acting at age 6, making his Broadway debut in 1948, in Sundown Beach. He appeared not quite two years later with Martha Scott in Design for a Stained Glass Window, and following his appearance as the showcased newcomer alongside veterans Otto Kruger, Neil Hamilton, and Fran Carlon on the December 11, 1950 episode of ABC's Hollywood Screen Test, Fallon made his big screen debut in the summer of 1951, as "Jimmy" in The Texas Rangers.

In March 1953, Fallon starred in "Treasure Island", an episode of NBC's The Doctor, dubbed by critic Steven H. Scheuer "one of the most appealing shows the Doctor's had in a great while."

An affectionate cops and robbers story [...] [a]bout a lonely little boy whose reading inspires fictional heroes, and what happens to him when he is faced with their real life counterparts[, it features] excellent acting by Russell Hardie, John Marley, Peg Hillias and Joey Fallon as the boy,

In 1954 and 1955, Fallon portrayed, respectively, Tom Sawyer and Huckleberry Finn, in episodes of Campbell Television Soundstage—paired with Eileen Heckart as Tom's Aunt Polly—and Frontiers of Faith, wherein Mark Twain's Huck encounters Sholem Aleichem's Mottel.

As of 1956 (notwithstanding a few remaining radio guest spots scattered over the next three years), Fallon had all but retired from acting, albeit unofficially, in order to better focus his energy on education. Following four years at Fordham Prep, his first-place finish in a city-wide, Knights of Columbus-sponsored oratory contest—and the resulting $1,200 scholarship—helped Fallon attend Georgetown University.

== Political career ==
In August 1963, Fallon was named college director of the Democratic National Committee. He later served under New York State Democratic leader John Burns—as executive assistant—as well as New York City Parks Commissioner August Heckscher. In 1972, he was appointed by Mayor John Lindsay "assistant to the mayor in charge of the Office of Ethnic Affairs," where he was said to "represent the mayor in matters of Church and Labor." Two years later, he headed Mario Cuomo's unsuccessful campaign for Lieutenant Governor of New York, and, from 1977 to 1983, he represented Manhattan's Yorkville district in the New York State Assembly.

Beginning no later than 1988, having previously completed his education at Brooklyn Law School and passed the New York state bar exam, Fallon was a member of the law firm Fisher, Fallon, Salerno, Betlesky and Kelly. In April 1990, he received some unwelcome publicity as one 14 attorneys across New York state charged with tax evasion by state attorney general Robert Abrams. Fallon ultimately pleaded guilty "to a single misdemeanor count of failure to file an income tax return in 1986" and received a $10,000 fine.

== Death ==
On November 17, 1993, Fallon died at age 51 of pancreatic cancer at Lenox Hill Hospital in Manhattan. He was survived by longtime companion Ann Phillips.

== Partial filmography ==
- Hollywood Screen Test
  - Episode aired December 11, 1950 – Himself (as Joseph Fallon)
- Let's Pretend
  - "The Little Lame Prince" (1951) – The Prince (age 7)
- Cosmopolitan Theatre
  - "Incident in the Blizzard" (1951)
- The Texas Rangers (1951) – Jimmy (as Joseph Fallon)
- Hands of Mystery
  - "The Game" (1951)
- Not for Publication
  - "The Cast-Offs" (1952)
- The Big Story
  - "Pat Foley of the Houston Post" (1951)
- Omnibus
  - "The Man in the Cool, Cool Moon" (1953)
- Man Against Crime
  - "Ferry Boat" (1953) – Boy (as Joseph Fallon)
- Suspense
  - "The Kiss-Off" (1953) – Little Boy
- The Doctor
  - "Treasure Island" (1953) – Charlie
- Frontiers of Faith
  - "From the Land of the Bible" (1953)
  - "Kasrilevke on the Mississippi" (1955) Huck
- The Campbell Television Soundstage
  - "A Little Child Shall Lead Them (a story of Tom Sawyer)" (1954) – Tom
- You Are There
  - "The Fall of Parnell (December 6, 1890)" (1954)
- The United States Steel Hour
  - "Fearful Decision" (1954) – Davie
- Center Stage
  - "The Desdemona Murder Case" (1954)
- Kraft Television Theater
  - "The Independent" (1954) – Scoop Florman
- Studio One
  - "An Almanac of Liberty" (1954) – Pre-teen townsperson (uncredited)
  - '"The Incredible Life of Horace Ford" (1955) – Third Kid
- Way of the World
  - "For Isabelle" Pts. 1 thru 7 (1955)
- Goodyear Television Playhouse
  - "Suit Yourself" (1955)
