= The Doctor (1952 TV series) =

American TV medical series (1952–1953)

The Doctor is a half-hour American medical anthology series that aired Sunday evenings on the NBC television network from August 24, 1952, until June 28, 1953, with a total of 44 episodes.

The format had the viewer seeing patients "through the eyes of a general practitioner who makes house calls". Hosted by Warner Anderson, the program revolved around emotional problems. Actors who appeared included Jay Jostyn, Anne Jackson, Ernest Truex, Mildred Natwick, and Lee Marvin. Beulah Bondi and Charles Bronson guest-starred in the episode "The Guest" (1952). One especially well-received 1953 episode, "Treasure Island" (about "a lonely little boy whose reading inspires fictional heroes, and what happens to him when he is faced with their real-life counterparts"), boasted "excellent acting" by Russell Hardie, John Marley, Peg Hillias, and, as the boy, Joey Fallon.

The Doctor replaced The Red Skelton Show on Sunday nights. Its competition included The Web on CBS. The program was produced on film by Marion Parsonnet. Some of the films were made in Hollywood, and others were made in New York. When it went into syndication, it was re-titled The Visitor. Robert Aldrich directed 17 episodes, three of which he also wrote. Rod Serling wrote two episodes.

Camay soap sponsored the program.
