= Forbidden Planet =

1956 science fiction film by Fred M. Wilcox

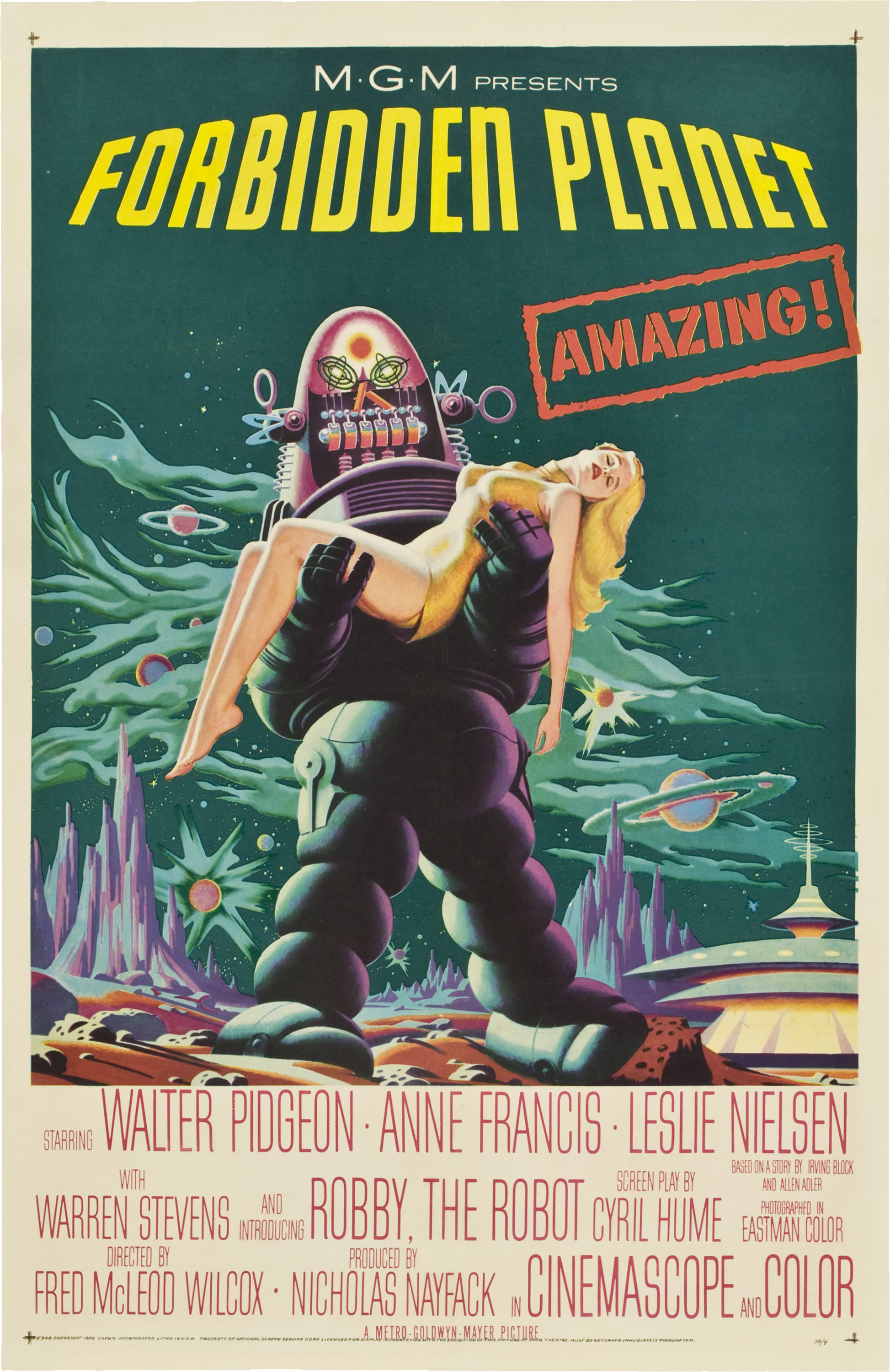
- Theatrical release poster
- Directed by: Fred M. Wilcox
- Screenplay by: Cyril Hume
- Story by: Irving Block; Allen Adler
- Produced by: Nicholas Nayfack
- Starring: Walter Pidgeon; Anne Francis; Leslie Nielsen; Warren Stevens; Robby the Robot
- Narrated by: Les Tremayne
- Cinematography: George J. Folsey
- Edited by: Ferris Webster
- Music by: Bebe and Louis Barron
- Production company: Metro-Goldwyn-Mayer
- Distributed by: Metro-Goldwyn-Mayer
- Release dates: March 2, 1956 (Charlotte, North Carolina)
- Running time: 98 minutes
- Country: United States
- Language: English
- Budget: $1.9 million
- Box office: $2.7 million

Forbidden Planet is a 1956 American science fiction film from Metro-Goldwyn-Mayer, produced by Nicholas Nayfack and directed by Fred M. Wilcox from a script by Cyril Hume that was based on a film story by Allen Adler and Irving Block. It stars Walter Pidgeon, Anne Francis, and Leslie Nielsen, and was shot in Eastmancolor and CinemaScope with Perspecta stereo. This landmark film is considered one of the great science-fiction films of the 1950s, a precursor of contemporary science-fiction cinema. The characters and isolated setting have been compared to those in William Shakespeare's The Tempest, and the plot contains certain events analogous to the play, leading many to consider it a loose adaptation.

Forbidden Planet pioneered several aspects of science-fiction cinema. It was the first sci-fi film to depict humans traveling in a human-made, faster-than-light starship. It was also the first to be set entirely on a planet orbiting another star, far away from Earth and the Solar System. The Robby the Robot character is one of the first film robots that was more than just a mechanical "tin can" on legs; Robby displays a distinct personality and is an integral supporting character in the film. Outside science fiction, the film was groundbreaking as the first of any genre to use an entirely electronic musical score, courtesy of Bebe and Louis Barron.

Forbidden Planet's effects team was nominated for the Academy Award for Best Special Effects at the 29th Academy Awards. Tony Magistrale describes it as one of the best examples of early techno-horror. In 2013, the film was selected for preservation in the United States National Film Registry by the Library of Congress as being "culturally, historically, or aesthetically significant".

== Plot ==
Film trailer

In the 23rd century, after more than a year's journey, the United Planets starship C-57D arrives at the distant planet Altair IV to determine the fate of the ship Bellerophon, sent there 20 years before. Dr. Edward Morbius, one of the original expedition's scientists, warns the ship not to land for safety reasons, but Commander John J. Adams ignores his warning.

Adams and Lieutenants Jerry Farman and "Doc" Ostrow are met by Robby the Robot, who transports them to Morbius' residence. Morbius describes how all other members of their expedition had been killed, one by one, by an unseen "planetary force", with the Bellerophon being vaporized as the last survivors tried to escape. Only Morbius, his wife (who, Morbius claims, later died of natural causes), and their daughter Altaira were somehow immune. Morbius offers to help the starship return home, but Adams says he must receive further instructions from Earth.

The next day, Adams finds Farman kissing Altaira. Furious, he rebukes Farman and criticizes Altaira for wearing revealing clothing. That night, an invisible intruder sabotages communications equipment aboard the starship. The next morning, Adams and Ostrow go to Morbius' residence to discuss the intrusion. While waiting, Adams happens upon Altaira swimming. After she dons a new, less revealing dress, Adams apologizes for his behavior toward her, and they kiss. They are suddenly attacked by Altaira's pet tiger, and Adams is forced to disintegrate it with his blaster.

Morbius appears and tells Adams and Ostrow that he has been studying artifacts of the Krell, a highly advanced race that mysteriously perished in a single night 200,000 years before. One such device enhances the intellect, which Morbius had used. He barely survived, but his intellectual capacity had doubled. Another is a vast 8,000-cubic-mile (33,000 km^{3}) underground machine, still functioning, powered by 9,208 thermonuclear reactors. Adams tells Morbius he must share these discoveries with Earth, but Morbius refuses, saying, "Humanity is not yet ready to receive such limitless power."

Farman erects a force field fence around the starship, but the unseen intruder easily passes through and brutally murders Chief Engineer Quinn, who was repairing the damaged communications equipment. Morbius warns Adams of his premonition of further deadly attacks. That night, the intruder is detected approaching. Its outline and features become visible when it enters the force field and blasters are fired at it, to little effect. The thing kills Farman and two other crewmen. When Morbius is awakened by Altaira's screams, the creature suddenly vanishes.

Adams tries to persuade Altaira to leave. Ostrow sneaks away and uses the Krell intellect enhancer, but is fatally injured. Before dying, he informs Adams that the underground machine's purpose was to create anything by mere thought, anywhere on the planet. However, he tells Adams the Krell forgot one thing: "Monsters from the id." The machine gave the Krell's own subconscious desires free rein with unlimited power, causing their own extinction. Adams deduces that Morbius's subconscious created the thing that both killed the original expedition members and attacked his crewmen; Morbius refuses to believe him.

Altaira tells Morbius that she is leaving Altair IV with Adams. Robby detects the creature approaching; Morbius commands Robby to kill it, but the robot knows it is Morbius and shuts down, being programmed to never kill a human. Adams, Altaira, and Morbius hide in the Krell laboratory, but the creature melts its way through the thick doors. Morbius finally accepts the truth and confronts and disowns his other self, but is fatally injured by the creature as it vanishes. Before he dies, he has Adams activate a planetary self-destruct system, warning them to be far away in deep space. At a safe distance, Adams, Altaira, Robby, and the surviving crew witness the obliteration of Altair IV. Adams reassures Altaira that in about a million years, the human race will stand where the Krell did. They embrace as C-57D heads back to Earth.

== Cast ==
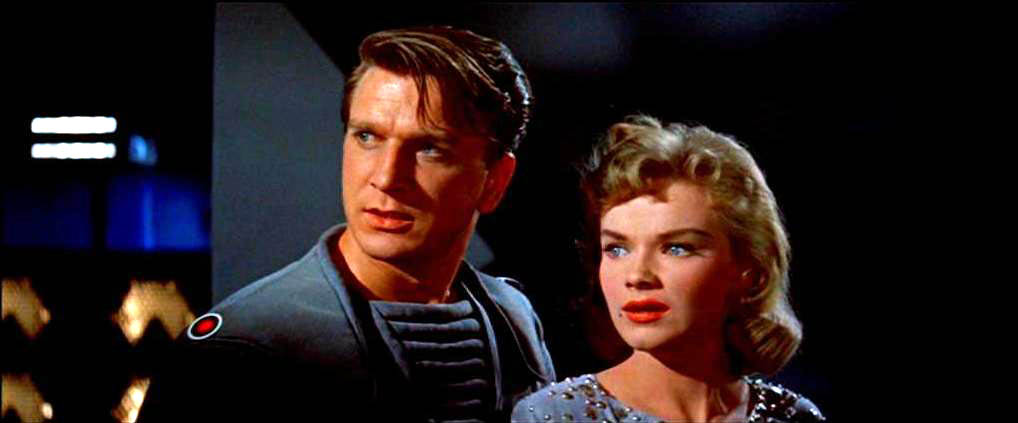
Leslie Nielsen and Anne Francis in Forbidden Planet

- Walter Pidgeon as Dr. Edward Morbius
- Anne Francis as Altaira "Alta" Morbius
- Leslie Nielsen as Commander John J. Adams
- Warren Stevens as Lieutenant "Doc" Ostrow
- Jack Kelly as Lieutenant Jerry Farman
- Richard Anderson as Chief Quinn
- Earl Holliman as Cook
- George Wallace as Bosun
- Robert Dix as Crewman Grey
- Jimmy Thompson as Crewman Youngerford
- James Drury as Crewman Strong
- Harry Harvey Jr. as Crewman Randall
- Roger McGee as Crewman Lindstrom
- Peter Miller as Crewman Moran
- Morgan Jones as Crewman Nichols
- Richard Grant as Crewman Silvers
- Robby the Robot as himself
- Frankie Darro and Frankie Carpenter as Robby the Robot (uncredited)
- Marvin Miller as the voice of Robby the Robot (uncredited)
- Les Tremayne as the Narrator (uncredited)
- James Best as Crewman (uncredited)
- William Boyett as Crewman (uncredited)

== Production ==
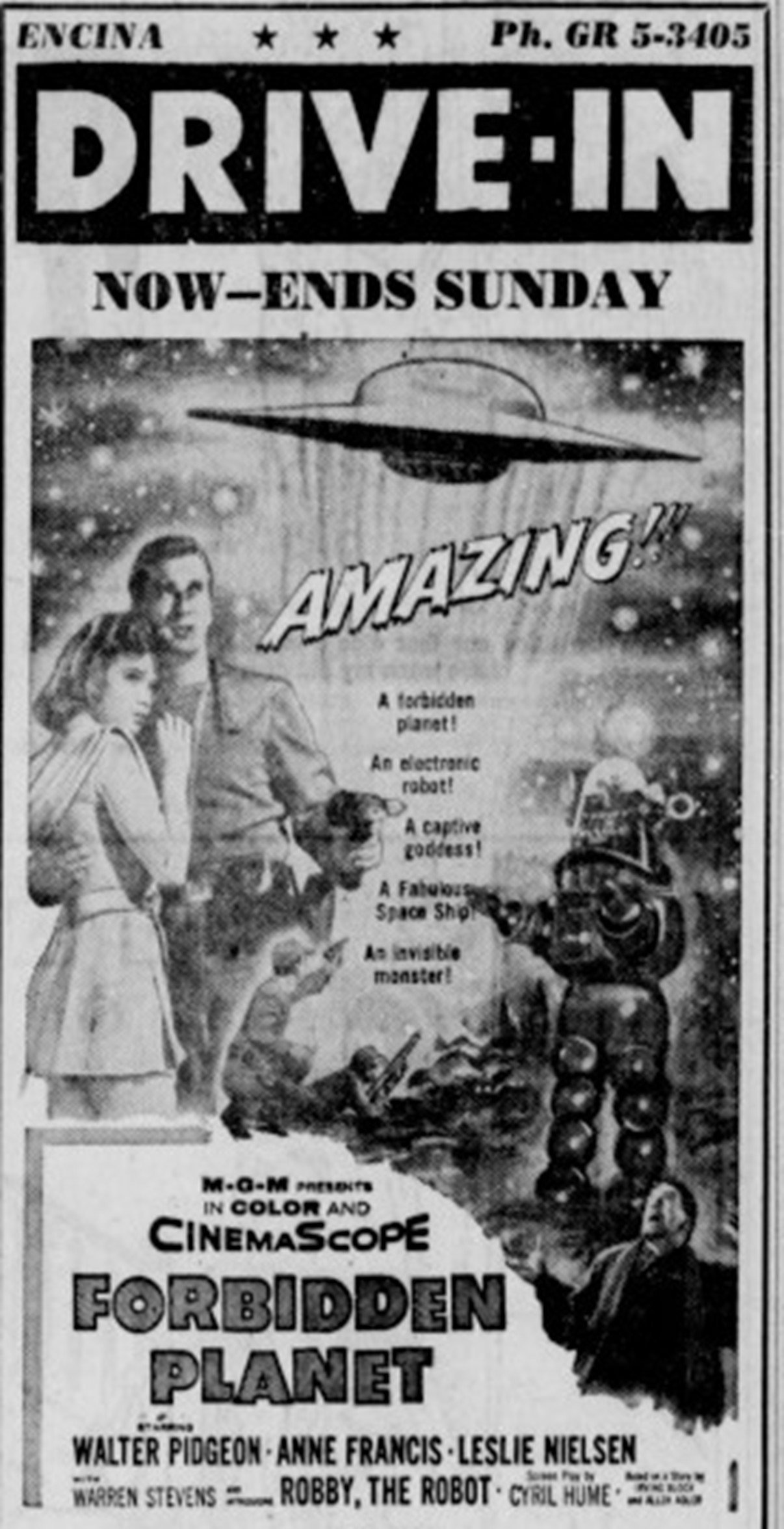
Drive-in advertisement from 1956

The screenplay by Irving Block and Allen Adler, written in 1952, was originally titled Fatal Planet. The later screenplay draft by Cyril Hume renamed the film Forbidden Planet, because this was believed to have greater box-office appeal. Block and Adler's drama took place in the year 1976 on the planet Mercury. An Earth expedition headed by John Grant is sent to the planet to retrieve Dr. Adams and his daughter Dorianne, who have been stranded there for twenty years. In this version, there is no Krell or a monster from the id. The invisible ape-like beast simply appears to be a native of Mercury. Hume's first story outline from November 1952 fleshed out and rewrote much of the original concept.

The film sets for Forbidden Planet were constructed on a Metro-Goldwyn-Mayer (MGM) sound stage at its Culver City film lot and were designed by Cedric Gibbons and Arthur Lonergan. The film was shot entirely indoors, with all the Altair IV exterior scenes simulated using sets, visual effects, and matte paintings. As the art director of the film, Lonergan took the liberty to build sets that were much larger than the budget allowed. The sets were already half done when the budget department found out, too late to do anything about it.

A full-sized mock-up of roughly three-quarters of the starship was built to suggest its full width of 170 ft (51 m). The starship was surrounded by a huge, painted cyclorama featuring the desert landscape of Altair IV; this one set took up all of the available space in one of the Culver City sound stages. Principal photography took place from April 18 to late May 1955.

At a cost of roughly $125,000, Robby the Robot was very expensive for a film prop at this time; it represented almost 7% of the film's $1.9 million budget and equates to at least $1 million in 2017 dollars. (Note: The robot was voiced by Marvin Miller, who also played Michael Anthony, the narrator of The Millionaire, a 1950s TV show.) Both the electrically controlled passenger vehicle driven by Robby and the truck/tractor-crane off-loaded from the starship were also constructed especially for this film. Robby later starred in the science-fiction film The Invisible Boy (1957) and appeared in many TV series and films.

The animated sequences of Forbidden Planet, especially the attack of the Id Monster, were created by veteran animator Joshua Meador, who was loaned to MGM by Walt Disney Productions. According to a "Behind the Scenes" featurette on the film's DVD, a close look at the creature shows it to have a small goatee beard, suggesting its connection to Dr. Morbius, the only character with this physical feature. Unusually, the scene in which the Id Monster is finally revealed during its attack on the Earth ship was not created using traditional cel animation. Instead, Meador simply sketched each frame of the entire sequence in black pencil on animation stand translucent vellum paper; each page was then photographed in high contrast, so that only the major details remained visible. These images were then photographically reversed into negative and the resulting white line images were then tinted red, creating the effect of the Id Monster's body remaining largely invisible, with only its major outlines illuminated by the energy from the force-field and blaster beams. The monster was considered so scary that in some states its image was edited out of the film so as to not frighten children. Meador was also responsible for the other visual effects, like the ray gun beams and disintegration scenes.

Although workprints of cinema films were normally destroyed, the workprint of Forbidden Planet was not destroyed, and was discovered in 1977. Differences are seen in characterization, dialogue, and scenes between the workprint and the release print.

== Reception ==
Forbidden Planet had its world premiere at the Southeastern Science Fiction Convention in Charlotte, North Carolina, on March 3 and 4, 1956. The film opened in more than 100 cities on March 23 in CinemaScope, Eastmancolor, and in some theaters, stereophonic sound, either by the magnetic or Perspecta processes.

At the review aggregator website Rotten Tomatoes, the film holds a rating of 93% based on 54 reviews from critics, averaging 8.20/10. The critics consensus reads: "Shakespeare gets the deluxe space treatment in Forbidden Planet, an adaptation of The Tempest with impressive sets and seamless special effects." Bosley Crowther of The New York Times wrote that everyone who worked on the film certainly "had a barrel of fun with it. And, if you've got an ounce of taste for crazy humor, you'll have a barrel of fun, too." Variety wrote: "Imaginative gadgets galore, plus plenty of suspense and thrills, make the Nicholas Nayfack production a top offering in the space travel category." Harrison's Reports called the film "weird but fascinating and exciting", with "highly imaginative" production. Philip K. Scheuer of the Los Angeles Times wrote that the film was "more than another science-fiction movie, with the emphasis on fiction; it is a genuinely thought-through concept of the future, and the production MGM has bestowed on it gives new breadth and dimension to that time-worn phrase, 'out of this world.'" John McCarten of The New Yorker called the film "a pleasant spoof of all the moonstruck nonsense the movies have been dishing up about what goes on among our neighbors out there in interstellar space." The Monthly Film Bulletin of Britain praised the film as "an enjoyably thorough-going space fantasy", adding, "In tone the film adroitly combines naivete with sophistication, approaching its inter-planetary heroics with a cheerful consciousness of their absurdity that still allows for one or two genuinely weird and exciting moments, such as the monster's first advance on the spaceship." The Philadelphia film critic Steve Friedman ("Mr. Movie") told interviewers that Forbidden Planet was his favorite film. He watched it 178 times. Pauline Kael called it "The best of the science-fiction interstellar productions of the 50s ... Caliban has become a marvellously flamboyant monster out of Freud—pure id. It's a pity the film ... didn't lift some of Shakespeare's dialogue: it's hard to believe you're in the heavens when the diction of the hero (Leslie Nielsen) and his spaceshipmates flattens you down to Kansas." Film historian Lee Pfeiffer wrote: "Much-beloved by science fiction fans, Forbidden Planet creaks with age, but if viewed in the context of the time in which it was produced, it remains quite impressive. ... Forbidden Planet is an intelligent sci-fi entry, even if the performances are sometimes over-the-top."

According to MGM records, the film initially earned $1,530,000 in the U.S. and Canada and $1,235,000 elsewhere resulting in a profit of $210,000.

Forbidden Planet was re-released to film theaters during 1972 as one of MGM's "Kiddie Matinee" features; it was missing about six minutes of film footage cut to ensure it received a G rating from the Motion Picture Association of America, including a 1950s-style muted scene of Anne Francis, which made it seem she swam without a bathing suit. Later video releases carry a G rating, although they are all the original theatrical version.

The American Film Institute nominated the film as one of its top-10 science-fiction films. The score was nominated for AFI's 100 Years of Film Scores.

== Home media ==
Forbidden Planet was first released in the pan and scan format in 1981 on MGM VHS and Betamax videotape and on MGM LaserDisc and CED Videodisc; years later, in 1996, it was again reissued by MGM/UA, but this time in widescreen VHS and LaserDisc, both for the film's 40th anniversary. The Criterion Collection later reissued Forbidden Planet in CinemaScope's original 2.55:1 aspect ratio for the first time, on a deluxe LaserDisc set with various extra features on a second disc. Warner Bros. next released the film on DVD in 1999 (MGM's catalog of films has since remained under ownership of Turner Entertainment, currently a division of Warner Bros. Discovery). Warner's release offered both cropped and widescreen picture formats on the same disc.

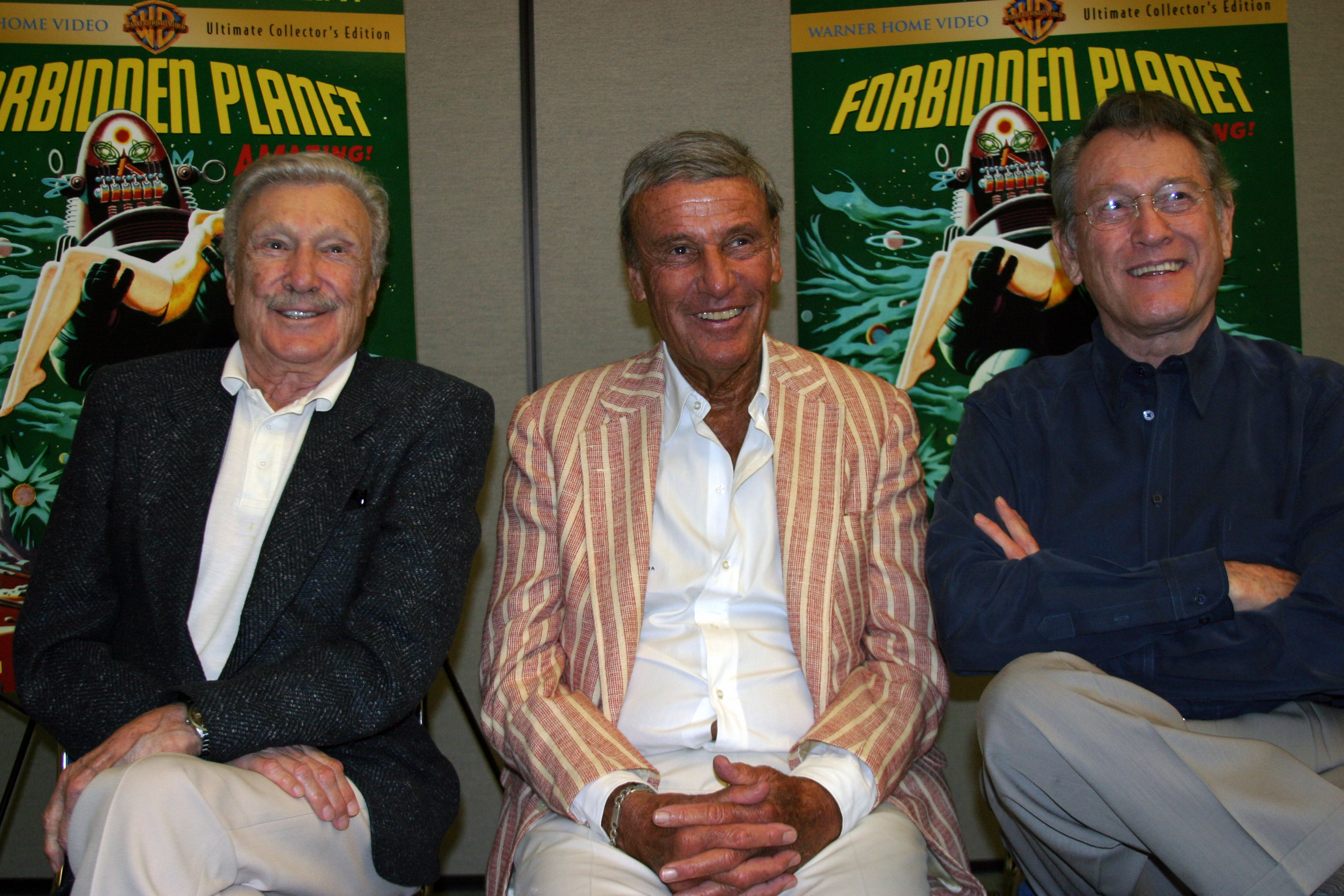
Warren Stevens (Doc Ostrow), Richard Anderson (Chief Quinn), and Earl Holliman (Cookie) at San Diego's Comic-Con International, July 2006

For the film's 50th anniversary, the Ultimate Collector's Edition was released on November 28, 2006, in an oversized red metal box, using the original film poster for its wraparound cover. Both DVD and high definition HD DVD formats were available in this deluxe package. Inside both premium packages were the films Forbidden Planet and The Invisible Boy, The Thin Man episode "Robot Client" ("Robby The Robot", one of the film's co-stars, was also a guest star in both The Thin Man episode and The Invisible Boy) and a documentary Watch the Skies!: Science Fiction, The 1950s and Us. Also included were miniature lobby cards and an 8 cm (3-inch) toy replica of Robby the Robot. This was quickly followed by the release of the Forbidden Planet 50th Anniversary edition in both standard DVD and HD DVD packaging. Both 50th anniversary formats were mastered by Warner Bros.-MGM techs from a fully restored, digital transfer of the film. A Blu-ray edition of Forbidden Planet was released on September 7, 2010.

In September 2026 a 4K Ultra HD was released in the US and the UK. This new 4K restoration from the original 35mm negative by Arrow Films in the original 2.55:1 aspect ratio, plus restored original Perspecta stereo.

== Novelization ==
Shortly before the film was released, a novelization appeared in hardcover and then later in mass-market paperback; it was written by W.J. Stuart (the pseudonym of mystery novelist Philip MacDonald), which chapters the novel into separate first person narrations by Dr. Ostrow, Commander Adams, and Dr. Morbius. The novel delves further into the mysteries of the vanished Krell and Morbius' relationship to them. In the novel, he repeatedly exposes himself to the Krell's manifestation machine, which (as suggested in the film) boosts his brain power far beyond normal human intelligence. Morbius retains enough of his imperfect human nature to be afflicted with hubris and a contempt for humanity. Not recognizing his own base primitive drives and limitations proves to be Morbius' downfall, as it had for the extinct Krell. While not stated explicitly in the film (although the basis for a deleted scene first included as an extra with the Criterion Collection's LaserDisc set and included with both the later 50th anniversary DVD and current Blu-ray releases), the novelization compared Altaira's ability to tame the tiger (until her sexual awakening with Commander Adams) to the medieval myth of a unicorn being tamable only by a virgin.

The novel also includes some elements never included in the film: in one of them, Adams, Farman, and Ostrow clandestinely observe Morbius' house overnight one evening, but see or hear nothing. When they leave they accidentally kill one of Altaira's pet monkeys. When Dr. Ostrow later on dissects the dead animal he discovers that its internal structure precludes it from ever having been alive in the normal biological sense. The tiger, deer, and monkeys are all conscious creations by Dr. Morbius as companions ("pets") for his daughter and only outwardly resemble their Earth counterparts. The novel also differs somewhat from the film in that it does not directly establish the great machine as the progenitor of the animals or monster; instead only attributes them to Morbius' elevated mental power. The Krell's self-destruction can be interpreted by the reader as a cosmic punishment for misappropriating the life-creating power of God. This is why in the film's ending, Commander Adams says in his speech to Altaira "...we are, after all, not God". The novel ends with a postscript making a similar observation.

== Soundtrack ==
Forbidden Planet's innovative electronic music score (credited as "electronic tonalities" due to disputes with the musicians' union) was composed by Bebe and Louis Barron. The two were originally slated to contribute about twenty minutes of sound effects and electronic pieces, as avant-garde composer Harry Partch was also due to contribute music. When Partch left the project, the Barrons took over the entire soundtrack. MGM producer Dore Schary had been approached by them at a nightclub in Greenwich Village while on a family Christmas visit to New York City, where they asked if he was interested in listening to a demonstration of their electronic music. Schary told them he was returning to California the next morning, but to assuage their disappointment, he promised to give them a chance if they ever came to California. Assuming he had heard the last of them, he was surprised when they showed up in Hollywood a few weeks later. Keeping his promise, he listened to their music, and after a consultation with the head of MGM's music department Johnny Green and the movie's producer Nicholas Nayfack, he agreed to hire them. When they declined to have all their equipment transferred from New York to Hollywood for a three-month job, the studio agreed, and the movie became MGM's first production to have its score produced outside of the studio lot. While the theremin had been used on the soundtracks of Spellbound (1945) and The Day the Earth Stood Still (1951), the Barrons are credited with creating the first completely electronic film score, preceding the development of analog synthesizers by Robert Moog and Don Buchla in the early 1960s.

Using ideas and procedures from the book Cybernetics: Or Control and Communication in the Animal and the Machine (1948) by the mathematician and electrical engineer Norbert Wiener, Louis Barron constructed his own electronic circuits that he used to generate the score's "bleeps, blurps, whirs, whines, throbs, hums, and screeches", making heavy use of ring modulation. After recording the basic sounds, the Barrons further manipulated the sounds with reverberation, delay, filters, and tape manipulations (as employed in the piece Williams Mix, which they had assisted John Cage in realizing at their Greenwich Village studio).

Since Bebe and Louis Barron did not belong to the Musicians Union, their work could not be considered for an Academy Award in either the "soundtrack" or "sound effects" categories; this also necessitated the "electronic tonalities" credit. MGM declined to publish a soundtrack album at the time that Forbidden Planet was released; however, film composer and conductor David Rose later published a 7-inch (18 cm) single of his original main title theme that he had recorded at the MGM studios in March 1956. Rose was originally hired to compose the musical score in 1955, but his main title theme was discarded when he was discharged from the project by Dore Schary in late December of that year. The film's original theatrical trailer contains snippets of Rose's score, the tapes of which he reportedly later destroyed.

The Barrons finally released their soundtrack in 1976 as an LP album for the film's twentieth anniversary; it was on their own Planet Records label (later changed to Small Planet Records and distributed by GNP Crescendo Records). The LP premiered at MidAmeriCon, the 34th World Science Fiction Convention, held in Kansas City, Missouri, over the 1976 Labor Day weekend, as part of a twentieth anniversary celebration of Forbidden Planet held at that Worldcon; the Barrons were there promoting their album's first release, signing all the copies sold at the convention. They also introduced the first of three packed-house screenings that showed an MGM 35mm fine-grain vault print in original CinemaScope and stereophonic sound. A decade later, in 1986, their soundtrack was released on a music CD for the film's thirtieth anniversary, with a six-page color booklet containing images from Forbidden Planet, plus liner notes from the composers and Bill Malone.

A tribute to the film's soundtrack was performed live in concert by Jack Dangers, and is available on disc one of the album Forbidden Planet Explored.

== Costumes and props ==
The costumes worn by Anne Francis were designed by Helen Rose. Her miniskirts resulted in Forbidden Planet being banned in Spain; it was not shown there until 1967. Other costumes were designed by Walter Plunkett.

Robby the Robot was operated at first by diminutive stuntman Frankie Darro. He was fired shortly after an early scene because of his having consumed a five-martini lunch prior to the scene being shot; he nearly fell over while attempting to walk while inside the expensive prop.

Many costume and prop items were reused in several different episodes of the television series The Twilight Zone, most of which were filmed by Rod Serling's Cayuga Productions at the MGM studio in Culver City, including Robby the Robot, the various C-57D models, the full-scale mock-up of the base of the ship (which featured in the episodes "To Serve Man" and "On Thursday We Leave for Home"), the blaster pistols and rifles, crew uniforms, and special effects shots.

In late September 2015, several screen-used items from Forbidden Planet were offered in Profiles in History's Hollywood Auction 74, including Walter Pidgeon's "Morbius" costume, an illuminating blaster rifle, blaster pistol, a force field generator post, and an original Sascha Brastoff steel prehistoric fish sculpture seen outside Morbius' home; also offered were several lobby cards and publicity photos. On November 2, 2017, the original Robby the Robot prop was offered for auction by Bonhams, and it earned US$5.3 million, including the buyer's premium. It set a new record for TCM-Bonhams auctions, surpassing the US$4 million earned for a Maltese Falcon in 2013, making it the most valuable film prop ever sold at auction.

== Remake ==
New Line Cinema had developed a remake with James Cameron, Nelson Gidding, and Stirling Silliphant involved at different times. In 2007, DreamWorks set up the project with David Twohy set to direct. Warner Bros. Pictures re-acquired the rights the following year and on October 31, 2008, J. Michael Straczynski was announced as writing a remake, Joel Silver was to produce. Straczynski explained that the original had been his favorite science fiction film, and it gave Silver an idea for the new film that makes it "not a remake", "not a re-imagining", and "not exactly a prequel". His vision for the film would not be retro, because when the original was made it was meant to be futuristic. Straczynski met with people working in astrophysics, planetary geology, and artificial intelligence to reinterpret the Krell back-story as a film trilogy. In March 2009, Straczynski reported that the project was abandoned, and that a new script was requested.

On November 15, 2024, Brian K. Vaughan was announced to be writing a new screenplay for the remake.

== See also ==
- Ex Machina – A 2015 film inspired (as was Forbidden Planet) by Shakespeare's The Tempest
- List of cult films – List of films that generated cult following

== Bibliography ==
- Alexander, David (1996). Star Trek" Creator: Authorized Biography of Gene Roddenberry. London: Boxtree. ISBN 0752203681.
- Booker, M. Keith (2010). Historical Dictionary of Science Fiction Cinema. Metuchen, New Jersey: Scarecrow Press, Inc. ISBN 978-0810855700.
- Frederick S Clarke and Steve Rubin. "Making Forbidden Planet". Cinefantastique. Volume 8. Double Issue: Numbers 2 and 3: Spring 1979. pp. 4–67.
- Lev, Peter (2006). Transforming the Screen, 1950–1959. History of the American Cinema 7. Oakland, California: University of California Press. ISBN 0520249666.
- Miller, Scott (2011). "Return to the Forbidden Planet" Archived January 1, 2013, at the Wayback Machine. Sex, Drugs, Rock & Roll, and Musical Theatre. Boston: Northeastern University. ISBN 978-1555537432.
- Prock, Stephan. "Strange Voices: Subjectivity and Gender in 'Forbidden Planet's Soundscape of Tomorrow" Archived June 18, 2022, at the Wayback Machine. Journal of the Society for American Music, 8.3 (2014), pp. 371–400.
- Ring, Robert C (2011). Sci-Fi Movie Freak. Iola, Wisconsin: Krause Publications, a division of F+W Media. ISBN 978-1440228629.
- Rubin, Steve. "Retrospect: Forbidden Planet". Cinefantastique. Volume 4, no. 1. Spring 1975. 4–13.
- Stuart, W.J.; MacDonald, Philip (1956) Forbidden Planet (A Novel), New York: Farrar, Straus and Cudahy. OCLC 6990372
- Warren, Bill (2009). Keep Watching the Skies: American Science Fiction Films of the 1950s, 21st Century Edition. Jefferson, North Carolina" McFarland & Company ISBN 978-0786442300.
- Wierzbicki, James (2005). Louis and Bebe Barron's Forbidden Planet: A Film Score Guide. Metuchen, New Jersey: Scarecrow Press. ISBN 978-0810856707.
- Wilson, Robert Frank (2000). Shakespeare in Hollywood, 1929–1956. Madison, New Jersey: Fairleigh Dickinson University Press. ISBN 0838638325.
