= Irving Block =

American artist and academic (1910-1986)

Irving Alexander Block
- Born: 2 December 1910; New York City, New York, U.S.
- Died: May 3, 1986 (aged 75); North Hollywood, Los Angeles, California, U.S.
- Education: New York University (B.S.) · National Academy of Design
- Occupation: Painter · Illustrator · Visual-effects artist · Academic · Screenwriter
- Years active: 1930s–1986
- Employer(s): 20th Century Fox · California State University, Northridge
- Known for: Matte‑painting & special effects in Hollywood sci‑fi; story originator for Forbidden Planet
- Notable work: Forbidden Planet (film story) · Kronos · Unknown World · contribution to Robby the Robot design
- Title: Professor of Art (CSUN, 1963–1980)
- Spouse: Gilda “Jill” Block
- Children: Gregg Block; Francesca Lia Block

Irving Block (1910-1986) was an American painter, illustrator, visual-effects artist, screenwriter, and professor. He worked on visual effects for Hollywood films and co-wrote the story that became Forbidden Planet. He later taught art at California State University, Northridge. His daughter is the writer Francesca Lia Block.

== Early life and education ==
Irving Alexander Block was born on December 2, 1910, in New York City. Block earned a Bachelor of Science degree from New York University and later studied at the National Academy of Design. During the 1930s, Block became involved with the Works Projects Administration's Federal Art Project, a New Deal initiative aimed at supporting artists during the Great Depression.

== Career in Hollywood ==
Block moved to California in the 1940s and worked in Hollywood. He joined 20th Century Fox as a matte shot artist, contributing visual effects and designs for various films. He created special effects for low-budget science-fiction and horror films using paintings and models. Block co-wrote the story that became the 1956 film Forbidden Planet. He is also credited with co-designing Robby the Robot, a character from the same film.

Over the years, Block contributed to numerous films, including Macabre, Kronos, The Caretakers, Alice in Wonderland, Atomic Submarine, Daniel in the Lion's Den, David and Goliath, The Exiles, The First Murder, Flight to Mars, From Caveman to Spaceman, Goya, Judgement of Solomon, Ripley's Believe it or Not, Stranger in my Skull, The Tower of Babel, and Venus and Adonis.

== Artistic career ==
Block also worked as a painter, illustrator, and muralist. In the 1960s, he exhibited his work in several Los Angeles-area art galleries. His exhibits received mostly favorable reviews from critics.

== Academic career ==
From 1963 to 1980, Block was a professor in the art department at California State University, Northridge (CSUN). After retiring from teaching, Block collaborated with the Santa Susana Press, published by the Oviatt Library at CSU Northridge, where he illustrated numerous fine press books in the 1970s and 1980s.

== Personal life and death ==
Block was married to the poet Gilda Block, also known as Jill Block. The couple had a son, Gregg, and a daughter, Francesca Lia Block, who became a writer known for her Weetzie Bat series. Block died on May 3, 1986, in North Hollywood, California.

== Archival collections ==
Block's personal and professional papers are archived at the Smithsonian Institution and at California State University, Northridge.
