= Nicholas Nayfack =

American film producer

- Born: January 27, 1909; Brooklyn, New York, U.S.
- Died: March 31, 1958 (aged 49); Beverly Hills, California, U.S.
- Occupation: Film producer
- Spouse(s): Lynne Carver (1937–1942, divorce); Patricia Schmidt

Nicholas Nayfack (January 27, 1909 – March 31, 1958) was an American movie producer whose notable works include Forbidden Planet and The Invisible Boy. He was the nephew of MGM studio chief Nicholas Schenck and United Artists studio boss Joseph M. Schenck.

== Early life ==
Nayfack was born in Brooklyn to Saul and Annie Nayfack. Annie was the sister of film producers Nicholas and Joesph Schenck. Nayfack had two brothers, Bertram and Jules. He graduated from the University of Pennsylvania and Columbia Law School.

== Career ==
Nayfack entered the film industry as a lawyer in 1934 and was working at Fox Film when it merged with 20th Century Pictures, headed by his uncle Joseph, in 1935. He left to join MGM in 1936, where his uncle Nicholas was president of the parent company, Loew's Inc.

Nayfack worked for 20th Century Fox as an associate producer under Darryl F. Zanuck from 1937 to 1939. After leaving Fox, he became the head of the business affairs office for MGM. He joined the Navy during World War II and was a lieutenant commander in the South Pacific. After the war he became a producer for MGM with his first picture Border Incident (1949). He formed his own company, Pan Productions with a distribution and financing deal with MGM who released his last film, The Invisible Boy (1957).

== Personal life ==
He married actress Lynne Carver in 1937 and they divorced in 1942. He later married Patricia Schmidt with whom he had a son, Nicholas Jr.

Nayfack died of a heart attack, aged 49, on March 31, 1958, at his Beverly Hills home.

== Filmography ==
- Border Incident (1949)
- Devil's Doorway (1950)
- Vengeance Valley (1951)
- No Questions Asked (1951)
- The Sellout (1952)
- Glory Alley (1952)
- Escape from Fort Bravo (1953)
- Rogue Cop (1954)
- The Scarlet Coat (1955)
- Ransom! (1956)
- Forbidden Planet (1956)
- The Power and the Prize (1956)
- Gun Glory (1957)
- The Invisible Boy (1957)
