= Cyril Hume =

American screenwriter (1900–1966)

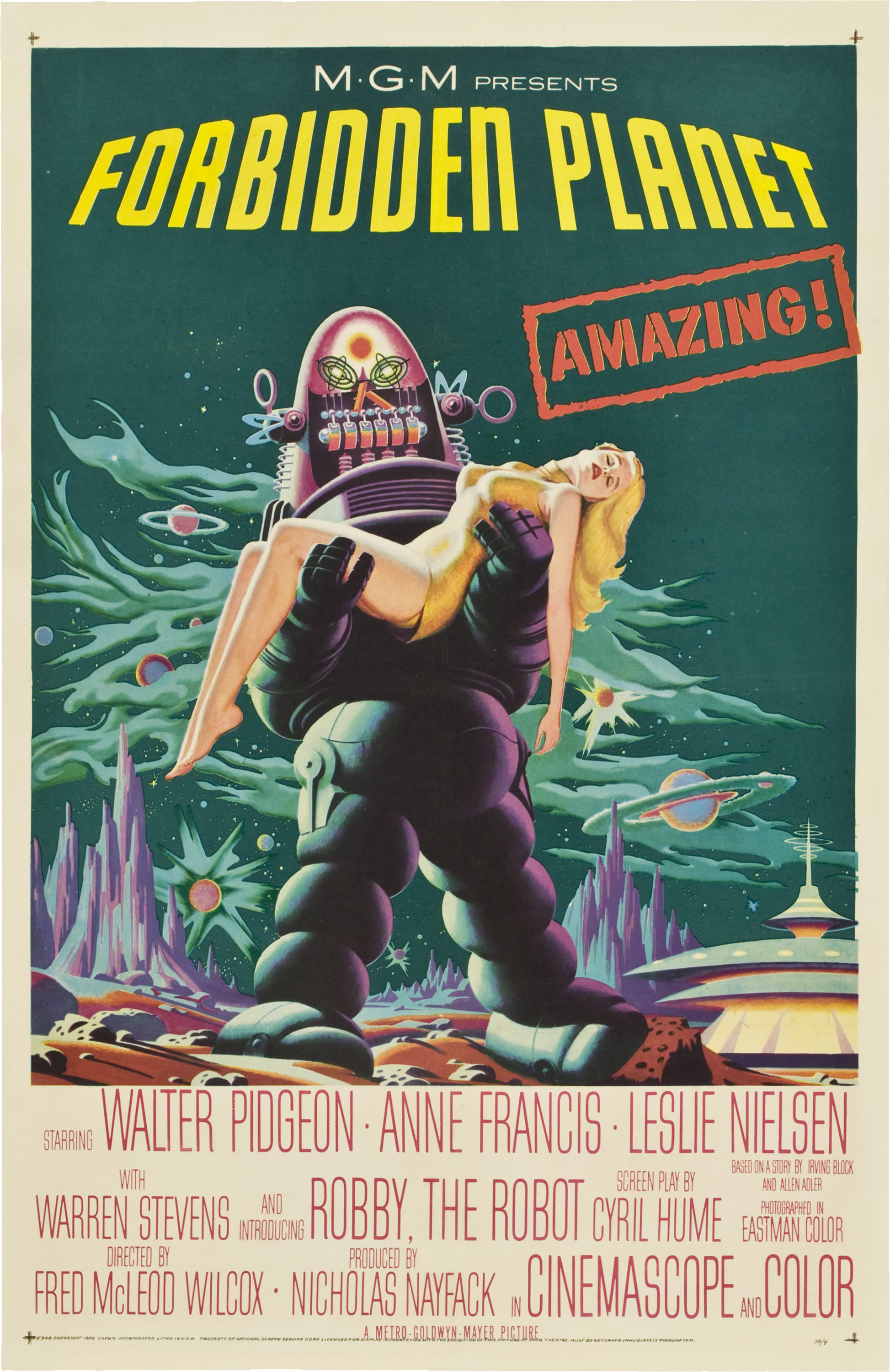
- Cyril Hume wrote science fiction film Forbidden Planet in 1956.
- Born: March 16, 1900; New York, New York, US
- Died: March 26, 1966 (aged 66); Palos Verdes, California, US
- Education: Yale University
- Occupations: Novelist, screenwriter
- Years active: 1924–1966
- Known for: Forbidden Planet (1956); The Great Gatsby (1949); Tokyo Joe (1949); Flying Down to Rio (1933); Tarzan the Ape Man (1932)
- Spouses: Jane Barbara Alexander (m. 1923; died 1925) Charlotte Dickinson (m. 1926, divorced) Helen Chandler (m. 1930; div. 1934) Maxine Gagnon (div. 1936): Dorothy Wallace

Cyril Hume (March 16, 1900 – March 26, 1966) was an American novelist and screenwriter. Hume was a graduate of Yale University, where he edited campus humor magazine The Yale Record. He was an editor of the collection The Yale Record Book of Verse: 1872–1922 (1922).

One year out of college, Hume was a $25-a-week "cub reporter" for the New York World when he wrote his first novel, Wife of the Centaur. It was published by the George H. Doran Company in October 1923 and listed at $2.50 as "A novel of youth and love today so poignant and vivid that it will attract wide attention." On November 22, he sold the motion-picture rights for $25,000, considered a record amount at the time.

Hume wrote for 29 films between 1924 and 1966, including Tarzan the Ape Man (1932), Flying Down to Rio (1933), The Great Gatsby (1949), Tokyo Joe (1949) and Forbidden Planet (1956).

== Early life ==
Hume was born March 16, 1900, in New Rochelle, New York.

In 1923, Hume was engaged to Jane Barbara Alexander, a published poet. After their marriage, the couple moved from New York to Florence, Italy. Alexander died in 1925 in Florence. The following year, Hume married Charlotte Dickinson. Hume married his third wife, Helen Chandler, in 1930; they were divorced in 1934. Hume's fourth wife was Maxine Gagnon, an actress. They were divorced in 1936. His fifth wife was Dorothy Wallace; they remained together until Hume's death.

== Death ==
Hume died on March 26, 1966, just 10 days after his 66th birthday, at his home in Palos Verdes, California. He was buried in the Whispering Pines section of Forest Lawn Memorial Park, Glendale.

== Published books ==
The Library of Congress catalogs eight books as by Hume (and six film or video items). One 1927 review of Street of the Malcontents and Other Stories notes that he has published three novels, and here "has collected his first book of short stories, five of which are contributions from the European scene."

- The Yale Record Book of Verse, 1872–1922, eds. Francis W. Bronson, Thomas Caldecot Chubb, and Hume (Yale University Press, 1922)
- Wife of the Centaur (George H. Doran Company, 1923)
- Cruel Fellowship (Doran, 1925)
- The Golden Dancer (Doran, 1926)
- Street of the Malcontents and Other Stories (Doran, 1927) – collection of stories
- A Dish for the Gods (Doubleday, Doran, 1929)
- Myself and the Young Bowman and Other Fantasies (Doubleday, Doran, 1932) – stories and poems
- My Sister, My Bride (Doubleday, Doran, 1932)

== Selected filmography ==
- The Wife of the Centaur (1924) – based on Hume's 1923 novel
- New Moon (1930)
- Trader Horn (1931)
- Daybreak (1931)
- Tarzan the Ape Man (1932)
- Flying Down to Rio (1933)
- Affairs of a Gentleman (1934)
- Limehouse Blues (1934)
- Yellow Dust (1936)
- The Devil Is a Sissy (1936)
- Tarzan Escapes (1936)
- The Jungle Princess (1936)
- The Great Gatsby (1949)
- Tokyo Joe (1949)
- Ransom! (1956)
- Forbidden Planet (1956)
- The Invisible Boy (1957)
