= Fools Rush In =

Fools Rush In may refer to:

- "Fools rush in where angels fear to tread", a line from the poem An Essay on Criticism by Alexander Pope
- "Fools Rush In (Where Angels Fear to Tread)", a 1940 popular song written by Johnny Mercer and Rube Bloom, covered by many artists
- Fools Rush In (play), a 1946 play by Kenneth Horne
- Fools Rush In (1949 film), a British comedy
- Fools Rush In (1973 film), a British TV documentary
- Fools Rush In (1997 film), an American romantic comedy
- "Fools Rush In" (Goodnight Sweetheart), a 1993 television episode
- "Fools Rush In" (Merseybeat), a 2001 television episode
- "Fools Rush In", a 2004 episode of All Grown Up!

== See also ==
- "Fools rush in", a prominent line in the Elvis Presley song, "Can't Help Falling in Love"
