= One Wild Oat =

1951 British comedy film by Charles Saunders

- Theatrical release poster
- Directed by: Charles Saunders
- Written by: Lawrence Huntington
- Screenplay by: Vernon Sylvaine
- Based on: One Wild Oat by Vernon Sylvaine (play)
- Produced by: John Croydon
- Starring: Stanley Holloway; Robertson Hare; Sam Costa
- Cinematography: Robert Navarro
- Edited by: Margery Saunders
- Music by: Stanley Black
- Production company: Coronet Films
- Distributed by: Eros Films
- Release date: 16 May 1951
- Running time: 77 minutes
- Country: United Kingdom
- Language: English

One Wild Oat is a 1951 British comedy film directed by Charles Saunders and starring Stanley Holloway, Robertson Hare and Sam Costa with pre-stardom appearances by Audrey Hepburn and Roger Moore as extras. The screenplay was by Vernon Sylvaine and Lawrence Huntington based on Sylvaine's 1948 play of the same title.

== Plot ==
Solicitor Humphrey Proudfoot attempts to discourage his daughter Cherrie's infatuation for Fred, a philanderer, by revealing Fred's past. The plan backfires when Alfred Gilbey, the daughter's would-be father-in-law, threatens to reveal the solicitor's own shady background.

== Cast ==
- Robertson Hare as Humphrey Proudfoot
- Stanley Holloway as Alfred Gilbey
- Sam Costa as Mr. Pepys
- Andrew Crawford as Fred Gilbey
- Vera Pearce as Mrs. Gilbey
- June Sylvaine as Cherrie Proudfoot
- Robert Moreton as Throstle
- Constance Lorne as Mrs. Proudfoot
- Gwen Cherrell as Audrey Cuttle #1
- Irene Handl as Emily Pepys (Audrey Cuttle #2)
- Ingeborg von Kusserow as Gloria Samson (as Ingeborg Wells)
- Charles Groves as Charles
- Joan Rice as Annie (maid)
- Audrey Hepburn as the hotel receptionist
- Fred Berger as Samson
- William Fox as the porter
- Roger Moore bit part (uncredited)

== Production ==
It was made at the Riverside Studios in Hammersmith with sets designed by the art director Ivan King.The stage production debuted at the Garrick Theatre in London and was directed by Jack Buchanan.

The stage version starred Robertson Hare, who reprised his role for the film, and Arthur Riscoe (who replaced Alfred Drayton following his death in 1949), the part being played by Stanley Holloway in the screen version.

June Sylvaine, who played Cherrie Proudfoot in the stage and film versions, was the wife of Vernon Sylvaine.

== Critical reception ==
The Monthly Film Bulletin wrote: "This is a routine adaptation of the stage farce, cast in the familiar mould. Robertson Hare repeats his stage performance with gusto, and has a hardworking team-mate in Stanley Holloway. Innuendo-laden dialogue produces the requisite number of laughs."

Variety wrote: "A successful British stage farce of last season, One Wild Oat has been transferred to the screen with the minimum of adjustment. It is given the broad laughter treatment that invariably rates high with British audiences, but it cannot expect to make anything of impact on the U.S. market."
