= Will Any Gentleman...? =

1953 British film by Michael Anderson

- British poster
- Directed by: Michael Anderson
- Written by: Vernon Sylvaine
- Based on: Will Any Gentleman? by Vernon Sylvaine
- Produced by: Hamilton G. Inglis
- Starring: George Cole; Veronica Hurst; Heather Thatcher; Jon Pertwee; William Hartnell
- Cinematography: Erwin Hillier
- Edited by: Max Benedict
- Music by: Wally Stott
- Production company: Associated British Picture Corporation
- Distributed by: Associated British-Pathé
- Release date: 24 August 1953
- Running time: 84 minutes
- Country: United Kingdom
- Language: English
- Box office: £128,522 (UK)

Will Any Gentleman...?, also known as Reluctant Casanova, is a 1953 British comedy film directed by Michael Anderson and starring George Cole, Veronica Hurst, Heather Thatcher, Jon Pertwee, and William Hartnell. It was written by Vernon Sylvaine based on his 1950 play Will Any Gentleman...?. It was the first of five movies Anderson made for ABPC and was reasonably successful at the box office.

It is notable for featuring both William Hartnell and Jon Pertwee onscreen together. Both actors would later go on to play the Doctor in Doctor Who.

== Plot ==
Henry Sterling, a mild-mannered bank clerk, visits a music hall to pay the manager a debt owed by his cheque-bouncing philandering brother. He is persuaded to stay and become the subject of a stage hypnotist, "The Great Mendoza". Fleeing back home, he cannot remember where he's been and what he's done.

His now-twin personas come and go at random. When in the hypnotised state, he becomes very reckless, both in chatting up women he would never normally dare approach, and spending money he has not got.

After he insults his domineering mother-in-law, his wife leaves him. He robs his boss of £300, but his brother realises what has happened and persuades the hypnotist to get him back to normal.

== Cast ==
- George Cole as Henry Sterling
- Veronica Hurst as Florence Sterling
- Heather Thatcher as Mrs. Whittle
- Jon Pertwee as Charley Sterling
- James Hayter as Dr. Smith
- William Hartnell as Detective Inspector Martin
- Sid James as Mr. Hobson
- Diana Decker as Angel
- Joan Sims as Beryl
- Brian Oulton as Mr. Jackson
- Alan Badel as The Great Mendoza
- Wilfred Boyle as Albert Boyle
- Alexander Gauge as Mr. Billing
- Jill Melford as Honey
- Josephine Douglas as doctor's receptionist
- Diana Hope as blonde In bank
- Martin Wyldeck as Commissionaire
- Richard Massingham as stout man
- Peter Butterworth as theatre stage manager
- Wally Patch as bookmaker
- Frank Birch as Mr. Brown
- Arthur Howard as Mr. Coding
- Lionel Jeffries as Mr. Frobisher
- Brian Wilde as clerk
- Nan Braunton as neighbour
- Lucy Griffiths as blonde outside bank
- Harry Herbert as stage door keeper
- Russ Allen as sporty type
- Philo Hauser as acrobat in dressing room
- Jean Marsh as dancer

== Production ==
The film was made at Elstree Studios with sets designed by the art director Terence Verity and shot in Technicolor by cinematographer Erwin Hillier.

== Critical reception ==
The Monthly Film Bulletin wrote: "This film will either entertain or bore, according to one's reaction to this venerable brand of farce. Most of the fun is derived from well-worn stage jokes, but, on the whole, they are put across with enough vigour and verve to make them seem quite fresh. Slow to start, it warms up into a fairly bright little film. There are nice performances by Joan Sims as the maid and Alan Badel as the magician. George Cole is not quite at ease as Henry, but perhaps this is because the part seems to belong to Robertson Hare, and one tends to think of Henry as middle-aged. "

The New York Times wrote, "Although the British movie makers have been known to make the most of humor, their infrequent lapses in this genre can be deadly dull. And Will Any Gentleman ...?, the farce by that cryptic title, which landed at the Plaza yesterday, falls flatly into the latter niche...All that may be said of Michael Anderson, a young and respected director, is that he has kept his cast, if not his story, moving. George Cole is largely bewildered and woebegone as the transformed bank teller. Jon Pertwee, who looks a bit like Danny Kaye, adds an occasional comic touch as his energetic, scapegrace brother. ... As the film's confused detective, William Hartnell delivers the script's most ambitious line when he says, "there's something funny going on around here!"

In British Sound Films: The Studio Years 1928–1959 David Quinlan rated the film as "good", writing: "Bright, funny, well-produced comedy."
