= Raymond Lovell =

Canadian actor (1900–1953)

- in Madness of the Heart (1949)
- Born: Raymond Lovell; 13 April 1900; Montreal, Quebec, Canada
- Died: 1 October 1953 (aged 53); London, England
- Occupation: Actor
- Years active: 1934–1953
- Spouses: Margot Ruddock (div. 1934) Tamara Desni (m. 1947; div. 1951)
- Children: Simone Lovell

Raymond Lovell (13 April 1900 – 1 October 1953) was a Canadian actor who performed in British films. He mainly played supporting roles, often somewhat pompous characters.

Lovell initially trained as a physician at Cambridge University, but gave up medicine for the stage in the 1920s. On stage he appeared as Henry VIII in The Queen Who Kept Her Head. In 1941 he starred in Vernon Sylvaine's Warn That Man!, then reprised his role for the 1943 film adaptation.

Lovell married Margot Ruddock, an actress, singer and poet, with whom he had a daughter, Simone Lovell. This relationship broke down when Ruddock began an affair with W. B. Yeats in 1934, the year her daughter was born. In 1947 he married Tamara Desni; they divorced in 1951.

== Selected filmography ==
- Love, Life and Laughter (1934) – Saville (uncredited)
- Warn London (1934) – Prefect
- The Third Clue (1934) – Robinson – Butler
- The Case of Gabriel Perry (1935) – Defence
- Crime Unlimited (1935) – Delaney
- Sexton Blake and the Mademoiselle (1935) – Captain
- Someday (1935) – Carr
- King of the Damned (1935) – Captain Torres
- Troubled Waters (1936) – Carter
- Gaol Break (1936) – Duke
- Not So Dusty (1936) – Mr. Holding
- Fair Exchange (1936) – Sir Reeves Willoughby
- Gypsy Melody (1936) – Court Chamberlain
- Secret Lives (1937) – German Secret Service Chief
- Behind Your Back (1937) – Adam Adams
- Glamorous Night (1937) – Ship's Officer (uncredited)
- Midnight Menace (1937) – Harris
- Under Secret Orders (1937) – Col. von Steinberg
- Murder Tomorrow (1938) – Inspector Travers
- Q Planes (1939) – Northern Salvage Company Manager (uncredited)
- Contraband (1940) – Van Dyne
- He Found a Star (1941) – Nick Maurier
- 49th Parallel (1941) – Lieutenant Kuhnecke
- The Common Touch (1941) – Cartwright
- The Goose Steps Out (1942) – Schmidt
- Let the People Sing (1942) – Bit Role (uncredited)
- Alibi (1942) – Prof. Winkler
- Uncensored (1942) – von Koerner
- The Young Mr. Pitt (1942) – George the Third
- Warn That Man (1943) – Hausemann / Lord Buckley
- The Man in Grey (1943) – The Prince Regent
- Candlelight in Algeria (1944) – Von Alven
- Hotel Reserve (1944) – Robert Duclos
- The Way Ahead (1944) – Mr. Jackson – Garage Owner
- Caesar and Cleopatra (1945) – Lucius Septimius
- Night Boat to Dublin (1946) – Paul Faber
- Appointment with Crime (1946) – Gus Loman
- The End of the River (1947) – Porpino
- Easy Money (1948) – Mr. Cyprus
- Who Killed Van Loon? (1948) – John Smith / Johann Schmidt
- The Three Weird Sisters (1948) – Owen Morgan-Vaughan
- So Evil My Love (1948) – Edgar Bellamy
- Snowbound (1948) – Undetermined Role (uncredited)
- The Calendar (1948) – Lord Willie Panniford
- My Brother's Keeper (1948) – Bill Wainwright
- The Blind Goddess (1948) – Frank Mainwaring KC
- Quartet (1948) – Sir Frederick Bland (segment "The Alien Corn")
- But Not in Vain (1948) – Jan Alting
- Once Upon a Dream (1949) – Mr. Trout
- The Bad Lord Byron (1949) – John Hobhouse
- Fools Rush In (1949) – Sir Charles Leigh
- Madness of the Heart (1949) – Comte de Vandiere
- The Romantic Age (1949) – Hedges
- The Mudlark (1950) – Sergeant Footman Naseby
- Time Gentlemen, Please! (1952) – Sir Digby Montague
- The Pickwick Papers (1952) – Aide
- The Steel Key (1953) – Inspector Forsythe
- I vinti (1953) – (final film role)

== Selected stage roles ==
- The Queen Who Kept Her Head by Winifred Carter (1934)
- Jupiter Laughs by A. J. Cronin (1941)
- Murder Without Crime by J. Lee Thompson (1942–43)
- A Lady Mislaid by Kenneth Horne (1950)
- Party Manners by Val Gielgud (1950)
- Intent to Murder by Leslie Sands (1951–52)
