= The Shop at Sly Corner (play) =

1945 play

- Original language: English
- Written by: Edward Percy
- Genre: Thriller

Premiere
- Date: 11 April 1945
- Place: St Martin's Theatre, London

The Shop at Sly Corner is a 1945 thriller play by the British writer Edward Percy.

An earlier version of the work had premiered at the Theatre Royal, Brighton, in 1941 under the title of Play with Fire. The revised version was staged at St Martin's Theatre in London's West End where it enjoyed a lengthy run of 863 performances between 11 April 1945 and 3 May 1947. Actors appearing at various stages in the original West End production included Victoria Hopper, Jean Colin, Joyce Heron, Cathleen Nesbitt, Viola Lyel, Kenneth Kent, Henry Oscar, Jack Vyvyan, Kenneth Griffith, Cyril Chamberlain and Deryck Guyler. Despite its London success, the play was a flop when it opened at the Booth Theatre in New York's Broadway, lasting for only seven performances.

== Film adaptation ==
In 1947 it was adapted into a British film of the same title directed by George King and starring Oskar Homolka, Muriel Pavlow and Derek Farr.

== Bibliography ==
- Goble, Alan. The Complete Index to Literary Sources in Film. Walter de Gruyter, 1999.
- Wearing, J. P. The London Stage 1940–1949: A Calendar of Productions, Performers, and Personnel. Rowman & Littlefield, 2014.
