= As Long as They're Happy =

1955 British film by J. Lee Thompson

- Directed by: J. Lee Thompson
- Written by: Alan Melville
- Based on: As Long as They're Happy by Vernon Sylvaine
- Produced by: Raymond Stross
- Starring: Jack Buchanan; Janette Scott; Jeannie Carson; Diana Dors
- Cinematography: Gilbert Taylor
- Edited by: John D. Guthridge
- Music by: Stanley Black
- Production company: Group Film Productions
- Distributed by: General Film Distributors
- Release date: 15 March 1955
- Running time: 91 minutes
- Country: United Kingdom
- Language: English

As Long as They're Happy is a 1955 British musical comedy film directed by J. Lee Thompson and starring Jack Buchanan, Susan Stephen and Diana Dors. It was written by Alan Melville based on the 1953 play of the same title by Vernon Sylvaine. It was shot in Eastmancolor at Pinewood Studios near London with sets designed by the art director Michael Stringer.

Producer Raymond Stross called it "a comedy with music".

== Plot ==
American singer Bobby Denver, known as the "Crying Crooner" (a la Johnnie Ray) stays with a stockbroker's family by mistake when he comes to England. The stockbroker has three very pretty daughters, with the youngest, Gwen, so madly in love with him that she wants to marry him. Eventually, the stodgy stockbroker deals with his wife and daughter as well as his maid Linda, who keeps fainting every time Bobby sings.

== Cast ==
- Jack Buchanan as John Bentley
- Janette Scott as Gwen Bentley
- Jeannie Carson as Pat Bentley
- Brenda de Banzie as Stella Bentley
- Susan Stephen as Corinne Bentley
- Jerry Wayne as Bobby Denver
- Diana Dors as Pearl Delaney
- Hugh McDermott as Barnaby Brady
- David Hurst as Dr. Hermann Schneider
- Athene Seyler as Mrs. Arbuthnot
- Joan Sims as Linda
- Nigel Green as Peter
- Dora Bryan as May
- Gilbert Harding as himself
- Joan Hickson as barmaid
- Peter Illing as French sergeant
- Edie Martin as elderly fan
- Hattie Jacques as party girl
- Leslie Phillips as box office manager
- Ronnie Stevens as box intruder
- Charles Hawtrey as Teddy boy
- Richard Wattis as theatre stage manager (uncredited)
- John Blythe as orchestra leader (uncredited)
- Norman Wisdom as Norman (uncredited)

== Production ==
The film was based on the comedy play by the British writer Vernon Sylvaine which was first staged in 1953 starring Jack Buchanan. It ran at the Garrick Theatre in the West End for 370 performances until May 1954.

In March 1954 it was announced that Raymond Stross had bought the film rights and Buchanan would appear in the film version; Stross wanted Frank Sinatra to play the singer. It would be Buchanan's first starring role in a movie in 14 years. In August it was announced Jeanne Carson would co star. The role of the American singer went to Jerry Wayne, who had performed in Guys and Dolls on stage in London; this was his film debut.

Sam Coslow wrote eight songs for the film. The movie has been called "a kind of musical".

It was Diana Dors's second film for J. Lee Thompson. She was offered the lead but was unable to do it but agreed to play a guest part at £200 a day. Kay Kendall had originally been offered this part but turned it down.

== Critical reception ==
The Monthly Film Bulletin wrote: "This film version of the stage farce has been considerably expanded to accommodate the talents of numerous performers not foreseen by the original play. The result is a sprawling series of "big" scenes, few of which come off. The basic joke (at the expense of American sob-singers), too, has lost much of its edge, and is scarcely in itself sufficient to carry a film of this length. Of the players, Jack Buchanan glides through the whole thing with an assured charm, and Jerry Wayne is capable as the singer. The rest contend somewhat ineffectively with a script deficient in humour, although Diana Dors handsomely brings off one of her familiar roles as a sexy blonde."

Variety called it "a hearty and good-hearted romp, without much attention to storyline."

Picturegoer wrote: "Jack Buchanan fools beautifully. He's as suave and debonair as ever. His take-off of the crooner is superbly funny. Guest stars Diana Dors, Gilbert Harding and Norman Wisdom aren't really necessary."

Picture Show wrote: "The film can't fail to please farce lovers."

The Radio Times Guide to Films gave the film 2/5 stars, writing: "This moderately amusing all-British comedy, with some music, was inspired by the 1950s craze for sob singer Johnnie Ray. The plot has an American crying crooner ... causing havoc in an English family with whom he stays. Jack Buchanan plays the unamused head of the household and the father of three daughters ... obsessed with the visitor."

British film critic Leslie Halliwell said: "Fractic farce extended from a stage satire of the Johnnie Ray cult; a patchy but sometimes funny star vehicle."

In British Sound Films: The Studio Years 1928–1959 David Quinlan rated the film as "good", writing: "Good-natured semi-musical romp in good colour, with lots of middle-sized laughs."
