= Code of Scotland Yard =

1947 British film by George King

- Directed by: George King
- Screenplay by: Reginald Long; Katherine Strueby
- Based on: The Shop at Sly Corner by Edward Percy
- Produced by: George King
- Starring: Oscar Homolka; Muriel Pavlow; Derek Farr
- Cinematography: Hone Glendinning
- Edited by: Manuel del Campo
- Music by: George Melachrino
- Production company: Pennant Pictures
- Distributed by: British Lion Films (UK)
- Release date: 10 March 1947
- Running time: 91 minutes
- Country: United Kingdom
- Languages: English, Italian
- Budget: £76,715
- Box office: £140,694 (UK)

Code of Scotland Yard (also known as The Shop at Sly Corner) is a 1947 British crime film directed by George King and starring Oscar Homolka, Muriel Pavlow and Derek Farr. It was written by Reginald Long and Katherine Strueby based on the stage play The Shop at Sly Corner by Edward Percy.

== Synopsis ==
A French antique dealer lives a comfortable life in London. He cares only for his daughter, who is trying to become a professional concert violinist. When his shop assistant discovers that much of his money comes from fencing stolen goods he attempts to blackmail the Frenchman.

== Cast ==
- Oscar Homolka as Descius Heiss
- Derek Farr as Robert Graham
- Muriel Pavlow as Margaret Heiss
- Manning Whiley as Corder Morris
- Kathleen Harrison as Mrs Catt
- Garry Marsh as Major Elliot
- Kenneth Griffith as Archie Fellowes
- Jan Van Loewen as Professor Vanetti
- Irene Handl as Ruby Towser
- Johnnie Schofield as Inspector Robson
- Diana Dors as Mildred
- Katie Johnson as woman in shop
- Vi Kaley as flower seller
- David Keir as gentleman customer
- James Knight as publican
- Eliot Makeham as theatre usher

== Production ==
Film rights were bought by British Lion in May 1945. It was one of the first three films made by Alexander Korda under his new deal with British Lion.

Oscar Homolka was imported from the USA to star.

Filming started at 6 August 1946. It was shot at Isleworth Studios. The film's sets were designed by the art director Bernard Robinson.

It was the film debut of Diana Dors. According to film reviewer Stephen Vagg, "The part was an ideal way to start out – the girlfriend of a slimy blackmailer – and Diana had 'it' from the start; looks, warmth, appeal".

Muriel Pavlow and Derek Farr, who played lovers in the film, were married shortly after filming.

== Reception ==
=== Box office ===
As of 30 June 1949 the film earned £124,197 in the UK of which £92,877 went to the producer. It made a profit of £16,162.

=== Critical ===
The Monthly Film Bulletin wrote: "Although the ending has been altered, and, although one misses the slow, drawn-out torture of Elliot's cross-examination of Heiss in the stage version, the story is infinitely more telling as a film than as a play, and gains immeasurably in dramatic value by its translation to the screen. In an outstanding cast, some of whom repeat their stage performances, Oscar Homolka has the part of his career and gives a memorable characterisation as Heiss."

Variety reported that the "film gathers pace and is truly cinematic in the second half, but the first part is deadly slow and too explanatory without explaining much. More, too, should have been made of the romance between the two young lovers."

TV Guide described it as an "interesting melodrama rich with character, thanks to the excellent performance by Homolka and a uniformly fine British cast."
