= Ronald Anscombe =

British cinematographer

- Born: 5 September 1908; London, England; United Kingdom
- Died: 30 December 1973 (aged 65); Kingston upon Thames, Surrey; United Kingdom
- Other name: Ronald George
- Occupation: Cinematographer
- Years active: 1937 - 1973 (film)

Ronald Anscombe (1908–1973) was a British cinematographer. After working as a camera operator on a number of films for ABPC at Welwyn Studios such as The Dark Eyes of London (1939) he was promoted to cinematographer, working mainly on documentaries.

== Selected filmography ==
=== Cinematographer ===
- Tower of Terror (1941)
- Suspected Person (1942)

=== Camera Operator ===
- The Dark Eyes of London (1939)
- East of Piccadilly (1941)
- Banana Ridge (1942)
- Warn That Man (1943)
- Women Aren't Angels (1943)
- The Man from Morocco (1945)

== Bibliography ==
- Johnson, Tom. Censored Screams: The British Ban on Hollywood Horror in the Thirties. McFarland, 2006.
