= Mignon O'Doherty =

Australian actress (1890–1961)

- 1939 Spotlight photo
- Born: 30 January 1890; Brisbane, Queensland, Australia
- Died: 21 March 1961 (aged 71); London, England, United Kingdom
- Other name: Mignon Nesbitt
- Education: RADA
- Occupation: Actress
- Years active: 1913–1960

Mignon O'Doherty (1890 – 1961) was an Australian actress who worked in British theatre, film and television.

O'Doherty was born in Brisbane, the daughter of Dr. Edward O’Doherty and Isabel Maud French. She was the granddaughter of Young Irelander Dr. Kevin Izod O’Doherty and his wife, the Irish revolutionary poet Mary Eva Kelly. She was also the granddaughter of General Sir George French, first commissioner of Canada’s Northwest Mounted Police. O'Doherty married actor Tom Nesbitt (1890-1927), the brother of actress Cathleen Nesbitt; they had two children.

O'Doherty made her London stage debut in 1913. She was listed in Who’s Who in the Theatre (ed. J. Parker) from at least the 8th edition until her death, with numerous stage credits as a character actress. In 1951 she appeared in Kenneth Horne's And This Was Odd at the Criterion Theatre.

O'Doherty was in the original cast of Agatha Christie's The Mousetrap, in which she played Mrs. Boyle, at the Ambassadors Theatre, London from 1952 to 1955.

== Selected filmography ==
- The Faithful Heart (1932)
- There Goes the Bride (1932)
- Channel Crossing (1933)
- The Good Companions (1933)
- Autumn Crocus (1934)
- Dandy Dick (1935)
- The Guv'nor (1935)
- Neutral Port (1940)
- He Found a Star (1941)
- Banana Ridge (1942)
- Hard Steel (1942)
- Let the People Sing (1942)
- The Lamp Still Burns (1943)
- Maytime in Mayfair (1949)
- White Corridors (1951)
- Ghost Ship (1952)
- The Crowded Day (1954)
- You Lucky People! (1955)
- Never Let Go (1960)

== Bibliography ==
- Chibnall, Steve & McFarlane, Brian. The British 'B' Film. Palgrave MacMillan, 2009.
