= Margot Ruddock =

English actress, poet and singer

Marguerite "Margot" Ruddock (1907–1951), who used the stage name Margot Collis, was an English actress, poet and singer. She had a relationship with W. B. Yeats starting in 1934. Their correspondence was published as Ah, Sweet Dancer (1970).

Yeats edited her poems for publication, but it is not clear how much change he made to them. He included some of them in the Oxford Book of Modern Verse, which he edited.

Some of her poems have been set as songs by the composer Robert Erickson.

She was married twice: first to John Collis, with whom she had a son, Michael, and secondly to Raymond Lovell, with whom she had a daughter, Simone Lovell. She died in 1951, when she was 44.

During her marriage to Raymond Lovell she had an affair with Yeats. When they met in 1934, Yeats was 69 and Ruddock`was 27. Their affair was conducted fitfully over the next few years. The affair broke down and Ruddock became mentally unstable. Some months later she followed Yeats (uninvited) out to the island of Majorca, where he was working with the Indian monk Shri Purohit Swami. Ruddock ended up in an asylum in Madrid from where she was rescued by Yeats and his friends, but later died in another institution, St. Ebba's Hospital in Epsom. Yeats' poem "A Crazed Girl" is believed to be inspired by Ruddock.
