= Wolf's Clothing =

Wolf's Clothing may refer to:

- Wolf's Clothing (1936 film), a British comedy film
- Wolf's Clothing (1927 film), an American comedy film
- Wolf's Clothing (play), a 1958 comedy play by Kenneth Horne
