= Night Boat to Dublin =

1946 film

- Directed by: Lawrence Huntington
- Written by: Lawrence Huntington; Robert Hall
- Produced by: Hamilton G. Inglis
- Starring: Robert Newton; Raymond Lovell; Muriel Pavlow
- Cinematography: Otto Heller
- Edited by: Flora Newton
- Music by: Charles Williams
- Production company: Associated British Picture Corporation
- Distributed by: Pathé Pictures
- Release date: 8 January 1946
- Running time: 100 minutes
- Country: United Kingdom
- Language: English
- Box office: £151,928 (UK)

Night Boat to Dublin is a 1946 British thriller film directed by Lawrence Huntington and starring Robert Newton, Raymond Lovell, Guy Middleton, Muriel Pavlow and Herbert Lom. It was written by Huntington and Robert Hall.

== Plot ==
During the Second World War, a captured German spy is executed at the Tower of London, without revealing the whereabouts of Professor Hansen, a refugee Swedish scientist in Britain. He is believed to be unwittingly passing information on the atomic bomb to Germany through the neutral Irish Free State. British intelligence attempts to locate him and break this link.

Two intelligence officers, Captain Grant and Captain Wilson, travel incognito on the overnight ferry to Dublin. They observe the German contact, Keitel, and their suspicion falls on lawyer Paul Faber. Grant manages to get a clerical job in Faber's London office, using a false identity. He allows himself to be exposed as an ex-army officer who's gone AWOL, and allows himself to be blackmailed by Faber into doing a number of illegal jobs. These include a marriage of convenience to Marion, a young Austrian girl who is desperate to acquire British nationality; also the theft of some radioactive items from a docks warehouse.

Eventually, the trail leads Grant, Hunter and the police to the fictional village of Hunstable in Devon, and from there to a cliff-edge mansion where Hansen is being hidden. A showdown in a sea cave under the mansion leaves the police triumphant.

Grant is directed to a room where his wife, Marion, is held. She expects a spy is entering and breaks a vase on his head. The film end with her kneeling next to him saying "Oh David".

== Cast ==
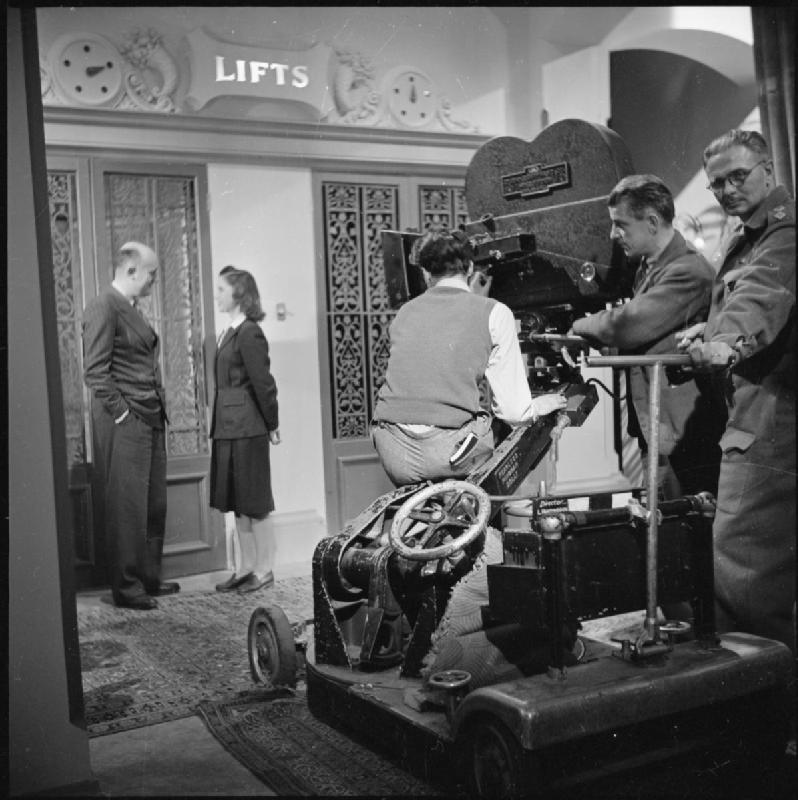
Muriel Pavlow on the set of the film

- Robert Newton as Captain David Grant
- Raymond Lovell as Paul Faber
- Guy Middleton as Captain Toby Hunter
- Muriel Pavlow as Marion Decker
- Herbert Lom as Keitel
- John Ruddock as Bowman
- Martin Miller as Professor Hansen
- Brenda Bruce as Lily Leggett
- Gerald Case as Inspector Emerson
- Scott Forbes as Lieutenant Allen
- Leslie Dwyer as George Leggett
- Valentine Dyall as Sir George Bell
- Marius Goring as Frederick Jannings
- Olga Lindo as Mrs. Coleman
- Joan Maude as Sidney Vane
- Hay Petrie as the station master
- Lawrence O'Madden as Captain Wilson
- Stuart Lindsell as Inspector Martin
- Gordon McLeod as Inspector Longhurst
- Derek Elphinstone as naval surgeon
- Bruce Gordon as hood
- Carroll Gibbons as self
- Edmundo Ros as self
- George Hirste as station official
- J. Hubert Leslie as ticket collector
- Wilfred Hyde-White as taxi driver

== Production ==
Filming took place in July 1945. It was shot at the Welwyn Studios in Hertfordshire with sets designed by the art director Charles Gilbert.

== Reception ==
The Monthly Film Bulletin wrote: "Robert Newton is always a pleasure to watch, with his precise movements and quick, glancing looks. Guy Middleton and Raymond Lovell beat their respective paths of asinine comedy and respectably disguised villainy, whilst a newcomer, Muriel Pavlow, plays the usual lady of doubtful allegiance but pathetic exterior. But if you are susceptible, as the reviewer is, to the hair-breadth, imminent and deadly then the film is most entertaining. Its excitements are continuous, and although it is a box-office piece it wears the air of enjoying itself immensely, which is captivating, anyway."

C.A. Lejeune in The Observer said the film was "effectively done in a small way and has the frankly preposterous zest of a boys' adventure story."

In British Sound Films: The Studio Years 1928–1959 David Quinlan rated the film as "good", writing: "Well-developed spy thriller, a catalogue of breathless excitements."

Leslie Halliwell called it a "Generally watchable low key thriller with familiar British ingredients."

The Radio Times Guide to Films gave the film 2/5 stars, writing: "This B-thriller is worth seeing for its treatment of a topical theme – atomic weapons – and the performance of Robert Newton, then on the cusp of stardom."
