= David (1951 film) =

1951 British film by Paul Dickson

- Directed by: Paul Dickson
- Written by: Paul Dickson
- Produced by: James Carr
- Starring: D.R. Griffiths; John Davies; Sam Jones; Rachel Thomas
- Cinematography: Ronald Anscombe
- Edited by: Catherine Morrison
- Music by: Grace Williams
- Production company: Regent Films
- Release date: 1951
- Running time: 38 minutes
- Country: United Kingdom
- Language: English

David is a 1951 British short biographical film about the Welsh miner and poet David Rees Griffiths. It was directed by Paul Dickson, who also wrote the script, shot by Ronald Anscombe, produced by James Carr, and distributed by Regent Films. Welsh composer Grace Williams wrote the score for the film. The film is 38 minutes long and was given a U certificate. It was the Welsh contribution to the Festival of Britain film festival.

== Cast ==
- D. R. Griffiths as Dafydd Rhys
- John Davies as Ifor Morgan
- Sam Jones as Rev Mr Morgan
- Rachel Thomas as Mrs Morgan
- Mary Griffiths as Mary Rhys
- Gwenyth Petty as Mary Rhys as a young woman
- Ieuan Davies as Dafydd Rhys as a young man
- Rev. Gomer Roberts as himself
- Prysor Williams as north Walian at Eisteddfod
- Ieuan Rhys Williams as south Walian at Eisteddfod
- Wynford Jones as narrator

== Plot ==
The central character is a working man, David Griffiths, known in the film as "Dafydd Rhys", a school caretaker for decades and a former miner. Dafydd's later years in Ammanford at Amman Valley Grammar School present an ordinary man with extraordinary virtues. His innate dignity is seen here as an inspiration to the film’s narrator Ifor Morgan, who recalls in adulthood his experiences as a school pupil under David’s wing.

The actual David Griffiths never achieved the fame of his brother, the miners' leader and first Welsh secretary Jim Griffiths, but here represents a traditional Welsh proletarian "type", who communicates a strong sense of his community's worth and retains a fierce loyalty to the memory of his fellow pitmen.

The film’s most poignant section deals with the impact on David of the death of his son, Gwilym, from tuberculosis, and the effect on Ifor and his fellow pupils of the caretaker's temporary estrangement from them as he retreats into himself and his memories. Dafydd is also shown leaving the Eisteddfod after his poem, an elegy to his dead son, has failed to win the coveted Chair. Amanwy did win several other chairs which can be found in church halls around South Wales, and in Ysgol Dyffryn Aman, as the former Amman Valley Grammar School is now called.

== Reception ==
The Monthly Film Bulletin wrote: "Through the simple yet flexible narrative method – the reminiscences of the narrator, and of Dafydd himself – the film gives a remarkable impression of place, atmosphere and character. Dafydd is played by D. R. Griffiths, actual caretaker of the Ammanford school; his strong, dignified, sympathetic and completely natural personality gives the film a firm centre, so that the different episodes – the scenes in the mine, the Eistedfodd, the scenes of village life, such as the visit of the circus – are not, as so often, merely a series of disjointed impressions. Paul Dickson, who showed something of the same sympathetic sense of character in his prize-winning film The Undefeated, here gives expression to human qualities rare in present day British documentary. ... Where the film occasionally falls short it is not through lack of imagination, but through the attempt to encompass too much. The cross-cutting, for instance, between the mine disaster and the child birth scenes strikes an artificial note out of keeping with the rest, which combines intelligent shaping of the narrative with an unstrained naturalism."

Variety wrote: "David is a slow-moving but impressive Welsh documentary made for the recently concluded Festival of Britain. Pic actually is a quasi-documentary since most of the yarn is recreated by professional actors. However, despite some artificiality in the story-telling and some too-evident artiness in the production technique, this short film registers with a moving sincerity. ... D. R. Griffiths, a real-life caretaker, plays the central character with an unwaveringly convincing performance. Other cast members are equally persuasive in contributing to this canvas of Welsh life."
