= Wolf's Clothing (play) =

Play by Kenneth Horne

- Original language: English
- Written by: Kenneth Horne
- Genre: Comedy

Premiere
- Date: 8 September 1958
- Place: New Theatre, Bromley

Wolf's Clothing is a comedy play by the British writer Kenneth Horne.

It premiered at the New Theatre in Bromley in 1958, and the following year enjoyed a run of 61 performances at the Strand Theatre in London's West End. The cast included Derek Farr, Muriel Pavlow, Ronald Adam, Patrick Cargill, Angela Browne, Elspet Gray and Viola Lyel.

== Original cast ==
- Andrew Spicer - Tony Beckley
- Janet Spicer - Diana Scougall
- Julian Calvert - Robert Hartley
- Lady Blore - Monica Moore
- Sally Calvert - Joan Seton
- Sir John Blore - Robert Lankesheer
- Yuli - Norma Parnell

== West End cast ==
- Andrew Spicer - Patrick Cargill
- Janet Spicer - Elspet Gray
- Julian Calvert - Derek Farr
- Lady Blore - Viola Lyel
- Sally Calvert - Muriel Pavlow
- Sir John Blore - Ronald Adam
- Yuli - Angela Browne

== Bibliography ==
- Wearing, J.P. The London Stage 1950-1959: A Calendar of Productions, Performers, and Personnel. Rowman & Littlefield, 2014.
