= Avice Landone =

English actress (1910–1976)

- In Carve Her Name with Pride (1958)
- Born: Avice Spitta; 1 September 1910; Quetta, British India
- Died: 12 June 1976 (aged 65); Richmond upon Thames, Surrey, England
- Occupation: Actress
- Years active: 1947–1972
- Spouse: Bruno Barnabe (m. 1940)
- Children: 1

Avice Landone (1 September 1910 – 12 June 1976) was an English actress who appeared in British television and film.

She was born in Quetta, British India, and made her screen debut in the 1948 film My Brother Jonathan. From 1961 she co-starred with Peggy Mount in the ITV sitcom Winning Widows. She appeared as Mrs Haddock in the three BBC series of TV adaptations from A. P. Herbert's Uncommon Law, A. P. Herbert’s Misleading Cases (1967, 1968 and 1971). Between 1970 and 1972 she played Margaret Brown in the television series Man at the Top.

She was married to the actor Bruno Barnabe. She retired from acting in 1972 and died in 1976, aged 65, from undisclosed causes.

== Filmography ==
Year	Title	Role	Notes
1948	My Brother Jonathan	Mrs. Martyn	
1950	Guilt Is My Shadow	Eva	
1951	The Franchise Affair	Mrs. Wynn	
1951	Laughter in Paradise	Shopper at Swan & Edgar	Uncredited
1951	White Corridors	Sister Jenkins	
1952	Something Money Can't Buy	Maternity Sister	Uncredited
1953	Personal Affair	1st Gossip	Uncredited
1953	Operation Diplomat	Mrs. Terry	
1953	Love in Pawn	Mrs. Trusslove	
1953	Escape by Night	Mrs. Weston	
1954	The Embezzler	Miss Ackroyd	
1954	Thought to Kill	Maud	
1955	An Alligator Named Daisy	Mrs. Weston	
1955	Windfall	Mary Lee	
1956	My Teenage Daughter	Barbara	
1956	Reach for the Sky	Douglas Bader's Mother	
1956	Eyewitness	Night Sister	
1957	True as a Turtle	Valerie Partridge	
1958	Rx Murder	Mrs. Motlock	
1958	Carve Her Name With Pride	Vera Atkins	
1958	The Wind Cannot Read	Second Nurse	
1958	A Cry from the Streets	Rachel	
1958	The 39 Steps	Louisa	Uncredited
1960	Operation Cupid	Mrs. Mountjoy	
1961	Five Golden Hours	Beatrice	
1962	Gaolbreak	Mrs. Wallis	
1964	This Is My Street	Lily	
1964	The Leather Boys	Reggie's Mother	
1964	Nothing But the Best	Mrs. Horton	
1969	Two Gentlemen Sharing	Mrs. Pater (Roddy's Mother)	
1971	The Blood on Satan's Claw	Isobel Banham	
1972	The Adventures of Barry McKenzie	Mrs. Gort	(final film role)

== Selected theatre roles ==
- Great Day (1945) by Lesley Storm
- A Lady Mislaid (1950) by Kenneth Horne
- And This Was Odd (1951) by Kenneth Horne
- Not in the Book (1958) by Arthur Watkyn
