= Lost Money =

Lost Money may refer to:

- Lost Money (1933 film), British film
- Lost Money (1919 film), American film
- Lost Money (El Chavo Animado), a 2007 episode of the animated series

== See also ==
- Parable of the Lost Coin
