= Madame Louise (play) =

1945 play

- Written by: Vernon Sylvaine
- Original language: English
- Genre: Comedy

Premiere
- Date premiered: 5 February 1945
- Place premiered: His Majesty's Theatre, Aberdeen

Madame Louise is a 1945 comedy play by the British writer Vernon Sylvaine.

It premiered at His Majesty's Theatre in Aberdeen and then went on to a long West End run at the Garrick Theatre, lasting for 410 performances between February 1945 and February 1946. The original cast included Robertson Hare, Alfred Drayton and Paul Demel.

== Film adaptation ==
In 1951 the play served as a loose basis for a film adaptation made at Walton Studios. Neither of the original stars appeared in the film version, which was rewritten to suit different actors.

== Bibliography ==
- Wearing, J.P. The London Stage 1940-1949: A Calendar of Productions, Performers, and Personnel. Rowman & Littlefield, 2014.
