= Peter Illing =

Anglo-Austrian actor (1899–1966)

- in The Four Just Men episode, The Prime Minister (1959)
- Born: Peter Ihle; 4 March 1899; Vienna, Austria
- Died: 29 October 1966 (aged 67); London, England, UK
- Years active: 1947–1966
- Spouse: Maxine Wolpert

Peter Illing (4 March 1899 – 29 October 1966) was an Austrian-born British film and television actor.

== Selected TV series ==
- The Four Just Men (1959) as Dr Mozek
- Deadline Midnight (1961) as Captain Dnieprovsky
- The Saint (1962) as Inspector Buono

== Selected filmography ==
- The Shot in the Sound Film Studio (1930) – Arzt
- Five from the Jazz Band (1932) – Bühnenmaler
- The Silver Darlings (1947) – Foreign Buyer
- The End of the River (1947) – Ship's Agent
- Against the Wind (1948) – Andrew
- Eureka Stockade (1949) – Raffaello
- Floodtide (1949) – Senor Arandha
- The Huggetts Abroad (1949) – Algerian Detective
- Poet's Pub (1949) – Charles (uncredited)
- Madness of the Heart (1949) – Dr. Matthieu
- Children of Chance (1949)
- State Secret (1950) – Macco, the magician
- My Daughter Joy (1950) – Sultan
- Her Favourite Husband (1950) – Commissario Scaletti
- Traveller's Joy (1950) – Tilsen
- I'll Get You for This (1951) – Armando Ceralde
- Outcast of the Islands (1952) – Alagappan
- The Woman's Angle (1952) – Sergei
- 24 Hours of a Woman's Life (1952) – M. Blanc
- Time Bomb (1953) – Carlo (uncredited)
- Never Let Me Go (1953) – N.K.V.D. Man
- Innocents in Paris (1953) – Panitov
- West of Zanzibar (1954) – Khingoni
- The House Across the Lake (1954) – Harry Stevens
- Flame and the Flesh (1954) – Peppe
- The Young Lovers (1954) – Dr. Weissbrod
- Svengali (1954) – Police Inspector
- Mask of Dust (1954) – Tony Bellario
- That Lady (1955) – Diego
- As Long as They're Happy (1955) – French Sergeant
- Born for Trouble (1955)
- Passport to Treason (1955) – Giorgio Sacchi
- It's Never Too Late (1956) – Guggenheimer
- Bhowani Junction (1956) – Ghanshyam
- Loser Takes All (1956) – Stranger
- The Battle of the River Plate (1956) – Dr. Guani – Foreign Minister, Uruguay
- Zarak (1956) – Ahmad
- Interpol (1957) – Capt. Baris
- Fire Down Below (1957) – Captain of Ulysses
- Manuela (1957) – Agent
- Miracle in Soho (1957) – Papa Gozzi
- Man in the Shadow (1957) – Carlo Raffone
- Campbell's Kingdom (1957) – The Doctor
- A Farewell to Arms (1957) – Milan Hotel Clerk (uncredited)
- Escapement (1958) – Paul Zakon
- I Accuse! (1958) – Georges Clemenceau
- The Angry Hills (1959) – Leonides
- Whirlpool (1959) – Braun
- Jet Storm (1959) – Gelderen
- Friends and Neighbours (1959) – Nikita
- The Wreck of the Mary Deare (1959) – Gunderson
- Operation Stogie (1959)
- Moment of Danger (1960) – Pawnbroker
- Bluebeard's Ten Honeymoons (1960) – Commissaire Lefevre
- Sands of the Desert (1960) – Sheikh Ibrahim
- The Secret Partner (1961) – Strakarios
- The Devil's Daffodil (1961) – Mr. (Jan) Putek
- The Happy Thieves (1961) – Mr. Pickett the Art Expert
- Middle Course (1961) – Gromik
- Village of Daughters (1962) – Alfredo Predati
- Nine Hours to Rama (1963) – Frank Ramamurti
- The V.I.P.s (1963) – Mr. Damer (uncredited)
- Echo of Diana (1963) – Kovali
- The Secret Door (1964) – Buergher
- Devils of Darkness (1965) – Inspector Malin
- A Man Could Get Killed (1966) – Zarik
