= A Lady Mislaid (play) =

1948 play

- Written by: Kenneth Horne
- Original language: English
- Genre: Comedy

Premiere
- Date premiered: 9 November 1948
- Place premiered: Embassy Theatre, London

A Lady Mislaid is a 1948 comedy play by the British writer Kenneth Horne.

It was first staged at the Embassy Theatre. In 1950 it ran for 148 performances at St Martin's Theatre in London's West End. The cast included Hugh Latimer, Raymond Lovell, Derek Blomfield, Joan Sanderson, Gwen Watford and Avice Landone.

== Adaptation ==
In 1958, it was adapted into a film of the same title. It was produced by ABPC, directed by David MacDonald and starred Phyllis Calvert and Thorley Walters.

== Bibliography ==
- Goble, Alan. The Complete Index to Literary Sources in Film. Walter de Gruyter, 1999.
- Wearing, J.P. The London Stage 1950-1959: A Calendar of Productions, Performers, and Personnel. Rowman & Littlefield, 2014.
