= It's Never Too Late (1956 film) =

British comedy by Michael McCarthy

- U.S. lobby card
- Directed by: Michael McCarthy
- Written by: Edward Dryhurst
- Based on: play It's Never Too Late by Felicity Douglas
- Produced by: George Pitcher; Jules Simmons
- Starring: Phyllis Calvert; Patrick Barr; Susan Stephen; Guy Rolfe
- Cinematography: C. M. Pennington-Richards
- Edited by: Charles Hasse
- Music by: Wally Stott; Louis Levy
- Production company: Park Lane Films
- Distributed by: Associated British-Pathé (UK)
- Release date: May 1956 (UK)
- Running time: 96 minutes
- Country: United Kingdom
- Language: English
- Box office: £128,208

It's Never Too Late is a 1956 British comedy film directed by Michael McCarthy and starring Phyllis Calvert, Patrick Barr, Susan Stephen and Guy Rolfe. It was written by Edward Dryhurst based on the 1952 play of the same name by Felicity Douglas.

== Plot ==
Feeling her combative family has long taken her for granted, genteel British housewife Laura Hammond somehow finds time to write a film script amidst the chaos of her home life. Her work catches the attention of a Hollywood producer, and Laura unexpectedly finds herself the author of a hit film. She also finds she can only write when she's surrounded by her dysfunctional family. Eventually, Laura must choose between being a highly paid writer and celebrity or a housewife.

== Cast ==
- Phyllis Calvert as Laura Hammond
- Patrick Barr as Charles Hammond
- Susan Stephen as Tessa Hammond
- Guy Rolfe as Stephen Hodgson
- Jean Taylor Smith as Grannie
- Sarah Lawson as Anne Hammond
- Delphi Lawrence as Mrs. Madge Dixon
- Peter Hammond as Tony
- Richard Leech as John Hammond
- Robert Ayres as Leroy Crane
- Peter Illing as Guggenheimer
- Irene Handl as neighbour
- Sam Kydd (uncredited)
- Fred Griffiths as removal man (uncredited)

== Critical reception ==
The Monthly Film Bulletin wrote: "This adaptation from the stage play consists mainly of a series of jokes strung together to form a typical 'matinee special'. Phyllis Calvert gives a spirited performance as the harassed but dependable matriarch-cum-author. The rest of the players do their best to enliven the stage clichés."

TV Guide noted, "some clever moments, but the film suffers from a staginess that makes it a mildly amusing comedy at best".

The Radio Times found it "an amiable comedy ...This is very much of its time, with its West End origins masked by skilful art direction, but the period cast is a British film fan's delight: Guy Rolfe, Patrick Barr, Susan Stephen, Irene Handl, and even a young Shirley Anne Field. Director Michael McCarthy whips up a fair old storm in this particular teacup, and, although nothing really happens, there's a great deal of pleasure to be had from watching Calvert attempt to rule over her unruly household."

In British Sound Films: The Studio Years 1928–1959 David Quinlan rated the film as "good", writing: "Bright, frothy, if stagy comedy with many a chuckle."
