= The House Across the Lake =

1954 British film by Ken Hughes

- American release poster
- Directed by: Ken Hughes
- Written by: Ken Hughes
- Based on: High Wray (Novel) by Ken Hughes
- Produced by: Anthony Hinds
- Starring: Alex Nicol; Hillary Brooke; Susan Stephen; Alan Wheatley
- Cinematography: Walter J. Harvey; Len Harris
- Edited by: James Needs
- Music by: Ivor Slaney
- Production company: Hammer Film Productions
- Distributed by: Associated British-Pathe (UK); Lippert Pictures (US)
- Release dates: May 1954 (U.S.); 21 June 1954 (UK)
- Running time: 70 minutes (US); 68 minutes (UK)
- Country: United Kingdom
- Language: English

The House Across the Lake (U.S. title: Heat Wave) is a 1954 British film noir crime film directed and written by Ken Hughes and starring Alex Nicol, Hillary Brooke, Sid James and Susan Stephen. Director Ken Hughes not only directed the film, he also was hired to write the screenplay based on a novel he wrote in 1952. Jimmy Sangster was assistant director, J. Elder Wills was the art director and Phil Leakey did makeup. It was produced as a second feature by Hammer Films. It was released in the United States by Lippert Pictures. Filming began August 10, 1953 and ended on September 4, 1953. It was trade shown on May 26, 1954 at Studio One. The film was released first in the US in May, 1954 by Lippert Pictures (retitled Heat Wave), then later in the UK on June 21, 1954 by Associated British-Pathe.

== Plot ==
An American pulp novelist, Mark Kendrick, meets his rich neighbours across the lake and is soon seduced by beautiful blonde Carol, the wife of Mr. Beverly Forrest, despite Beverly treating him as a friend. When Beverly is knocked unconscious by a fall on his boat, Carol fails to persuade Mark to throw him overboard, so Carol does it herself, drowning him.

After first refusing to go along with her plan to call it an accident, Mark agrees when Carol tells him that they will meet up again later and live off her dead husband's money. However, after the coroner rules the death an accident, Mark does not hear from her for weeks, but the still suspicious CID inspector on the case arranges for Mark to find out that Carol has secretly married another old flame and changed residences. Mark angrily confronts her, but she sneers that she only used him and that there is nothing he can do about it without implicating himself. Mark decides to confess, thinking that, although it will probably mean a prison sentence for him, it will mean the rope for Carol.

== Cast ==
- Alex Nicol as Mark Kendrick
- Hillary Brooke as Carol Forrest
- Sid James as Mr. Beverly Forrest
- Susan Stephen as Andrea Forrest
- Paul Carpenter as Vincent Gordon
- Alan Wheatley as Inspector MacLennan
- Peter Illing as Harry Stevens
- Gordon McLeod as Doctor Emery
- Joan Hickson as Mrs. Hardcastle
- John Sharp as Mr. Hardcastle
- Hugh Dempster as Frank
- Monti DeLyle as head waiter

== Production ==
The film was based on the 1952 novel High Wray by Ken Hughes. It was filmed at Bray Studios, with several days of location shooting in the Northern Lake District. Nicol and Brooke were the only Americans in the cast, although Brooke played a British character. Her mastery of a "posh" accent caused her to be typecast as British in Hollywood films starting in the 1940s.

== Critical reception ==
The Monthly Film Bulletin wrote: "Yet another vehicle for American stars, with British players in support. Alex Nicol plays adequately as Kendrick, Alan Wheatley gives a neat, incisive performance as the inspector, and the film is well constructed and photographed. Unfortunately, the plot revolves around the fatal charm of Carol Forrest, and Hillary Brooke cannot make this seem credible."

Picturegoer wrote: "Maybe night life in the Lake District was never like this, but this Americanized version of a luxury-level killing makes elegant entertainment. A British-made film with American stars, it captures the ease and escapism of the smoothest thrillers."

According to The Independent, "The film was praised by critics, and began Hughes's ascent into more important productions."

Filmink said "It's quite a fun movie, reminiscent of The Postman Always Rings Twice (1946); one is inclined to wonder if Nicol's character, a writer under the pump and distracted by lust, was a Hughes self-portrait."
