= Alan White (actor) =

Australian actor (1925–2013)

Alan White (3 January 1925 – 4 October 2013) was an Australian actor who worked extensively in radio and on stage.

He later moved to England and had a successful career there. He was mentored by Peter Finch.

His television credits included Ghost Squad, Danger Man, Man in a Suitcase, The Prisoner (in the episode "Dance of the Dead"), The Champions, Doctor Who serial The Tenth Planet. He also appeared in a number of British films, including No Time for Tears (1957) and Seven Keys (1961).

He won the 1952 Macquarie Award for male lead role, for his performance in Mr Tie Toe.

== Select credits ==
- Into the Straight (1949) - film
- Chips - radio serial
- Kain (1967)
- A Lady Mislaid (1958) as Sgt. Bullock
