= Susan Stephen =

English actress (1931–2000)

- Born: Susan Rennie Stephen; 16 July 1931; London, England
- Died: 21 April 2000 (aged 68); Sussex, England
- Years active: 1952–1962
- Spouse(s): Lawrence Ward (1952–1956) (divorced); Nicolas Roeg (1957–1977) (divorced); 4 children

Susan Rennie Stephen (16 July 1931 – 21 April 2000) was an English film actress born in London.

== Career ==
In her teens she pursued TV roles, subsequently moving to feature films, mainly in B-films in the 1950s. She appeared in more than 20 films including The Red Beret (1953), The House Across the Lake (1954), Pacific Destiny (1956) and Carry On Nurse (1959). She appeared in several films for the Rank Organisation.

In 1952, she married Lawrence Ward. The marriage ended in divorce in 1956.

In 1955, she joined other celebrities, such as Jack Payne, in British Pathé's Return to Yesterday.

In 1957, she married for the second time, to Nicolas Roeg who later became a film director. She and Roeg had four sons: Luc, Waldo, Sholto and Nico. Luc later also became a cinema professional. In the 1960s, she concentrated on her family and gradually stepped down from acting. Her last role was in the 1962 comedy Three Spare Wives. The marriage with Roeg ended in divorce in 1977.

== Filmography ==
- His Excellency (1952) – Peggy Harrison
- Stolen Face (1952) – Betty
- Treasure Hunt (1952) – Mary O'Leary
- Father's Doing Fine (1952) – Bicky
- Finishing School (1953) – Lorna Whitmore
- The Red Beret (1953) – Penny Gardner
- Stryker of the Yard (1953) – Peggy Sinclair
- Golden Ivory (1954) — Ruth Meecham
- The House Across the Lake (1954) – Andrea Forrest
- Dangerous Cargo (1954) – Janie Matthews
- For Better, for Worse (1954) – Anne Purves
- As Long as They're Happy (1955) – Corinne Bentley
- Value for Money (1955) – Ethel
- It's Never Too Late (1956) – Tessa Hammond
- Pacific Destiny (1956) – Olivia Grimble
- The Barretts of Wimpole Street (1957) – Bella Hedley
- Carry On Nurse (1959) – Nurse Georgie Axwell
- Return of a Stranger (1961) – Pam Reed
- The Court Martial of Major Keller (1961) – Laura Winch
- Operation Stogie (1962) – Stella
- Three Spare Wives (1962) – Susan
