= Nap Hand (play) =

1940 play

- Written by: Vernon Sylvaine; Guy Bolton
- Original language: English
- Genre: Comedy

Premiere
- Date premiered: 19 February 1940
- Place premiered: Manchester Opera House

Nap Hand is a 1940 comedy play by Vernon Sylvaine and Guy Bolton. The title refers to the sporting term, a nap hand. The farce revolves around quintuplets.

After premiering at the Manchester Opera House, it ran for 83 performances at the Aldwych Theatre in London between 2 March and 11 May 1940. The cast included Ralph Lynn, Kay Walsh, William Hartnell, Marjorie Corbett, Francis de Wolff, Frederick Piper and Bertha Belmore. It was produced by Austin Melford.

== Bibliography ==
- Wearing, J.P. The London Stage 1940-1949: A Calendar of Productions, Performers, and Personnel. Rowman & Littlefield, 2014.
