= A Spot of Bother (1938 film) =

- Original Trade Advertisement
- Directed by: David MacDonald
- Written by: Stephen Clarkson; John Cousins; A.R. Rawlinson (Additional dialogue)
- Based on: play A Spot of Bother by Vernon Sylvaine
- Produced by: Anthony Havelock-Allan
- Starring: Robertson Hare; Alfred Drayton; Sandra Storme
- Cinematography: Francis Carver
- Edited by: Lister Laurance
- Music by: Percival Mackey
- Production company: Pinebrook Films
- Distributed by: General Film Distributors (UK)
- Release date: August 1938
- Running time: 70 minutes
- Country: United Kingdom
- Language: English

A Spot of Bother is a 1938 British comedy film directed by David MacDonald and starring Robertson Hare, Alfred Drayton, Sandra Storme and Kathleen Joyce. The film is a farce in which a bishop unwisely decides to loan the cathedral funds to a dubious businessman. Meanwhile, his secretary is involved with smuggled goods. It was shot at Pinewood Studios and adapted from a play by Vernon Sylvaine. The film's sets were designed by Wilfred Arnold.

== Cast ==
- Robertson Hare as Mr Rudd
- Alfred Drayton as Mr Watney
- Sandra Storme as Sadie
- Kathleen Joyce as Margaret Watney
- Ruth Maitland as Mrs Watney
- Gordon James as Joe
- Robert Hale as Colonel Pigge
- Fewlass Llewellyn as Bishop of Barchester
- Drusilla Wills as Miss Hagworthy
- Julian Vedey as Scheipman
- O. B. Clarence as Butler
- Edie Martin as An Occasional Bar-Lady
- Hay Petrie as McTavish the Golf Club Official

== Critical reception ==
TV Guide called the film a "decent comedy with some good character performances."
