= Love in a Mist (play) =

- Written by: Kenneth Horne
- Original language: English
- Genre: Comedy

Premiere
- Date premiered: 3 November 1941
- Place premiered: Connaught Theatre, Worthing

Love in a Mist is a 1941 comedy play by the British writer Kenneth Horne. The plot around a honeymooning couple at an isolated cottage on Exmoor.

It premiered at the Connaught Theatre in Worthing. It then transferred to St Martin's Theatre in the West End, enjoying a run of 91 performances between 20 November 1941 and 7 February 1942. The cast included Ann Todd, Anna Konstam, Richard Bird, Michael Shepley and Marjorie Rhodes.

== Bibliography ==
- Wearing, J.P. The London Stage 1940-1949: A Calendar of Productions, Performers, and Personnel. Rowman & Littlefield, 2014.
