= Simone Lovell =

British actress (born 1934)

- Born: 19 February 1934 (age 92); Barcelona, Spain
- Occupation: Actress
- Years active: 1954–1968
- Spouse(s): Peter Halliday (m. 1956; div. 197?)
- Children: 4
- Parent(s): Raymond Lovell; Margot Ruddock

Simone Lovell (born 19 February 1934) is a British actress known for her television appearances of the 1950s and 60s.

She is the daughter of the Canadian-born actor Raymond Lovell and Margot Ruddock, whose relationship broke down when Ruddock began an affair with W. B. Yeats in 1934, the year Simone Lovell was born. She was the stepdaughter of Tamara Desni during her father's short marriage (1947–51) to that actress. In 1956 Lovell married the actor Peter Halliday, with whom she had three sons, Simon, Patrick and Ben Halliday. They divorced in the early 1970s. Her two youngest sons attended Oswestry School, as did their father before them.

Her television appearances include The Adventures of the Scarlet Pimpernel (1956), The Count of Monte Cristo (1956), ITV Play of the Week (1958), Ivanhoe (1958), The Adventures of William Tell (1959), The Adventures of Robin Hood (1955–60), The Four Just Men (1960), Emergency – Ward 10 (1961), Z-Cars (1965), The Wednesday Play (1968) and Public Eye (1968).

She also appeared in the films The Harassed Hero (1954) and Meet Mr. Malcolm (1954).
