= Tower of Terror (1941 film) =

- DVD cover
- Directed by: Lawrence Huntington
- Written by: John Reinhardt (story); John Argyle
- Produced by: John Argyle
- Starring: Wilfrid Lawson; Michael Rennie; Movita; Morland Graham
- Cinematography: Ronald Anscombe; Walter J. Harvey; Bryan Langley
- Edited by: Flora Newton
- Music by: Charles Williams
- Production company: Associated British Picture Corporation
- Distributed by: Pathé Pictures; Monogram Pictures (US)
- Release date: 29 September 1941
- Running time: 78 minutes
- Country: United Kingdom
- Language: English

Tower of Terror is a 1941 British wartime second feature ('B') thriller film directed by Lawrence Huntington and starring Wilfrid Lawson, Michael Rennie and Movita. It was written by John Reinhardt and John Argyle, and was made at Welwyn Studios with location shooting on Flat Holm off the Welsh coast.

The film makes no attempt at either German or even German accents and all German characters speak with an educated English accent.

== Plot ==
Anthony Hale is a British secret agent in Germany who takes a job as assistant to lighthouse keeper Wolfe Kristan under the assumed name of Albers. He plans to return to Britain with some valuable papers. The plan is for him to be picked up by a British boat. He meets and befriends Marie, who has escaped from a concentration camp and pretends to be the keeper's niece. She had tried to evade capture by the local police by jumping into the sea but was rescued and taken to the lighthouse by the deranged Kristan, who sees in her the image of Marthe, his wife whom he killed 16 years earlier and buried in the basement of the lighthouse. Kristan has a hook instead of a right hand giving him a sinister appearance. This disability increases his need for an assistant.

Kristan tries to kill Albers by hoisting him up the side of the lighthouse on the pretence of a high-level task but then releases the winch, hoping Albers will fall to his death. This does not work.

After several violent encounters with Kristan, Hale and Marie manage to make their way down to the beach where they board the British boat. The lighthouse is destroyed by gunfire from a German destroyer whose captain had been alerted by Hale's signal to his rescue vessel. Kristan, prostrate with grief over his wife's opened grave, is killed during the bombardment.

== Cast ==
- Wilfrid Lawson as Wolfe Kristan
- Michael Rennie as Anthony Hale / Eric Albers
- Movita as Marie Durand
- Morland Graham as Harbour Master Kleber
- George Woodbridge as Gruppenfuhrer Rudolf Jurgens
- Charles Rolfe as Albers
- Richard George as Ship's Captain Borkmann
- H Victor Weske as Peters, resigning lighthouse assistant
- Olive Sloane as Florist
- Eric Clavering as Riemers
- John Longden as Commander
- Edward Sinclair as Fletcher, Hale's contact
- Bob Cameron as Military Sergeant
- Davina Craig
- Noel Dainton

== Critical reception ==
The Monthly Film Bulletin wrote: "Wilfrid Lawson is not always convincing as Kristan – he is inclined to overact. Movita is sympathetic and appealing as Marie and Michael Rennie is well cast as Hale; they are well supported by the rest of the cast. The Nazi atmosphere and details are not very impressive, and although some of the sea scenes make up for what these others lose, there seems to be something lacking in the general composition of the film."

Kine Weekly wrote: "Wilfrid Lawson overacts a little as the demented Kristan, but nevertheless manages to evoke considerable sympathy. Movita is an appealing Marie, and Michael Rennie is every inch the true-blue British espionage agent is Hale. ... The Nazi atmosphere and detail are not days convincing, but the psychological approach to espionage, nevertheless, cloaks many of the minor technical faults and, at the same time, gives new impetus to conventional romance. "

The New York Times reviewer called it a "dire little melodrama... A penny dreadful thriller about a mad lighthouse keeper on the German-occupied coast, it cannot overcome the lack of a preposterous story preposterously acted, or a sound track which gives the impression that every one is speaking with a gag over the mouth. Even Wilfrid Lawson, that excellent actor, gives a ludicrously overwrought portrait of insanity as the keeper... Not good".

Variety wrote: "When the British make a horror picture, it usually is either gosh awful or excellent. This is the former. ... Acting varies from fair to terribly bad. Direction is about the same."
