= Fools Rush In (play) =

1946 comedy play

- Written by: Kenneth Horne
- Original language: English
- Genre: Comedy

Premiere
- Date premiered: 1946

Fools Rush In is a 1946 comedy play by the British writer Kenneth Horne. It ran at the Fortune Theatre in London's West End for 237 performances between 2 September 1946 and 29 March 1947.

== Adaptation ==
In 1949 it was adapted into a film of the same title directed by John Paddy Carstairs and starring Sally Ann Howes and Guy Rolfe.

== Bibliography ==
- Goble, Alan. The Complete Index to Literary Sources in Film. Walter de Gruyter, 1999.
- Wearing, J.P. The London Stage 1940-1949: A Calendar of Productions, Performers, and Personnel. Rowman & Littlefield, 2014.
