= The Court Martial of Major Keller =

1961 British film by Ernest Morris

- Directed by: Ernest Morris
- Written by: Brian Clemens
- Produced by: Edward J. Danziger; Harry Lee Danziger
- Starring: Laurence Payne; Susan Stephen; Ralph Michael; Richard Caldicot
- Cinematography: James Wilson
- Edited by: Spencer Reeve
- Music by: Bill LeSage
- Production company: Danziger Productions
- Distributed by: Warner-Pathé Distributors
- Release date: December 1961
- Running time: 69 minutes
- Country: United Kingdom
- Language: English

The Court Martial of Major Keller is a 1961 British second feature ('B') film directed by Ernest Morris and written by Brian Clemens. It stars Laurence Payne, Susan Stephen and Austin Trevor. The film recounts the court martial for murder of Major Keller, a British army officer during the Second World War. He is charged with killing his superior officer, but he remains the only witness as to what happened and why.

== Cast ==
- Laurence Payne as Major Keller
- Susan Stephen as Laura Winch
- Ralph Michael as Colonel Winch
- Richard Caldicot as Harrison
- Basil Dignam as Morrell
- Austin Trevor as Power
- Simon Lack as Wilson
- Humphrey Lestocq as Lieutenant Cameron
- Jack McNaughton as Miller
- Hugh Cross as Captain Cuby
- Peter Sinclair as Sergeant

== Critical reception ==
The Monthly Film Bulletin wrote: "A left-over from the series of 'B' pictures formerly made by the Danzigers, and ironically, somewhat superior to most of its predecessors. Though modest and presented without frills, it is capably acted, and commands enough standard courtroom tension to keep it going. The main weakness lies in the contrived ending."

TV Guide gave the film two out of four stars, calling it an "occasionally interesting courtroom drama."
