= Lost Money (1933 film) =

- Directed by: Norman Lee
- Written by: Henri Diamant-Berger
- Starring: Kid Berg; Judy Kelly; Julian Rose
- Release date: 1933
- Country: United Kingdom
- Language: French

Lost Money (French:L'argent par les fenêtres) is a 1933 French-language British comedy film directed by Norman Lee and starring Kid Berg, Judy Kelly and Julian Rose. It is the French-language version of the comedy Money Talks which had been made at Elstree Studios by British International Pictures.

== Cast ==
- Kid Berg
- Judy Kelly
- Julian Rose

== Bibliography ==
- Low, Rachael. Filmmaking in 1930s Britain. George Allen & Unwin, 1985.
- Wood, Linda. British Films, 1927-1939. British Film Institute, 1986.
