= Money Talks (1932 film) =

1932 film

- Directed by: Norman Lee
- Written by: Edwin Greenwood; Norman Lee; Frank Miller
- Starring: Julian Rose; Kid Berg; Judy Kelly
- Cinematography: Walter J. Harvey
- Music by: Idris Lewis
- Production company: British International Pictures
- Distributed by: Wardour Films
- Release date: 15 November 1932
- Running time: 73 minutes
- Country: United Kingdom
- Language: English

Money Talks is a 1932 British comedy film directed by Norman Lee and starring Julian Rose, Kid Berg and Judy Kelly. It was made at Elstree Studios by British International Pictures. A separate French-language version Lost Money was also released.

== Cast ==
- Julian Rose as Abe Pilstein
- Kid Berg as Kid Burke
- Gladdy Sewell as Anna
- Judy Kelly as Rosie Pilstein
- Gus McNaughton as Solly Sax
- Griffith Jones as Jimmy Dale
- Bernard Ansell as Hymie Burkowitz
- Lena Maitland as Mrs. Blumberg
- Hal Gordon as Pug Wilson
- Mary Charles as Nellie Kelly
- Jimmy Godden as Joe Bell

== Bibliography ==
- Low, Rachael. Filmmaking in 1930s Britain. George Allen & Unwin, 1985.
- Wood, Linda. British Films, 1927-1939. British Film Institute, 1986.
