= Warn That Man =

1943 British film by Lawrence Huntington

- Directed by: Lawrence Huntington
- Written by: Lawrence Huntington; Vernon Sylvaine
- Based on: Warn That Man! by Vernon Sylvaine
- Produced by: Warwick Ward
- Starring: Gordon Harker; Raymond Lovell; Jean Kent; Finlay Currie
- Cinematography: Günther Krampf
- Edited by: Flora Newton
- Music by: Charles Williams
- Production company: Associated British Picture Corporation
- Distributed by: Pathé Pictures
- Release date: 13 July 1943
- Running time: 82 minutes
- Country: United Kingdom
- Language: English

Warn That Man is a 1943 British comedy thriller film directed by Lawrence Huntington and starring Gordon Harker, Raymond Lovell and Finlay Currie. It was written by Huntington and Vernon Sylvaine based on the latter's 1941 play Warn That Man! which had run for ten months on the West End stage, with Harker reprising his original role. The film was made at Welwyn Studios, with sets designed by the art director Charles Gilbert.

The plot is similar to the later film The Eagle Has Landed (1976) which also concerns a plot to kidnap Winston Churchill from rural England.

== Plot ==
At a country house during the Second World War, a German actor, who looks uncannily like a British peer, takes his place as part of a German attempt to kidnap the Prime Minister, Winston Churchill, when he visits the estate. Unfortunately for their plans, the niece of the peer arrives unannounced, along with her RAF pilot fiancé, and two of his new friends, who had rescued him at sea when he was shot down.

== Cast ==
- Gordon Harker as George Hawkins
- Raymond Lovell as Hausemann / Lord Buckley
- Finlay Currie as Captain Andrew Fletcher
- Philip Friend as John Cooper
- Jean Kent as Frances Lane
- Frederick Cooper as Charles / Frampton
- Carl Jaffe as Schultz
- John Salew as Wilson
- Veronica Rose as Miss Conway
- Anthony Hawtrey as Brent
- Anthony Holles as waiter
- Patrick Aherne as Mellows
- Frank Bagnall as Lehmann
- Ferdy Mayne as German radio operator
- Friedrich Richter as Wolheim
- Leonard Sharp as Miles

== Critical reception ==
The Monthly Film Bulletin called the film "exciting and most entertaining", adding: "Raymond Lovell, in the dual role of Lord Buckley and the German actor impersonating him, does a difficult job excellently, as do all the other members of the cast. The photography throughout the film is clever, and especially so in those parts where Raymond Lovell appears on the screen as the real and bogus Lord Buckley at the same time."

Picture Show wrote: "If you can swallow the possibility of the impersonation of the whole household of an English country house by Nazi spies you'll enjoy this hectic melodrama of a plot to kidnap the Prime Minister. ... Plenty of excitement, with cockney comedy by Gordon Harker."

Leslie Halliwell said: "On the stage this must have been an effective comedy-thriller, but the film is stymied by stiff handling."

In British Sound Films: The Studio Years 1928–1959 David Quinlan rated the film as "average", writing: "Thriller thrills but can't overcome its unlikeliness."
