= Oxford Book of Modern Verse 1892–1935 =

The Oxford Book of Modern Verse 1892–1935 is a poetry anthology edited and introduced by W. B. Yeats and published in 1936 by Oxford University Press.

== Contents ==
Yeats begins his long introduction by saying that he has tried to include "all good poets who have lived or died from three years before the death of Tennyson to the present moment". Implicitly the field is English-language poetry of Great Britain (which Yeats refers to throughout as "England") and Ireland, though notably a few Indian poets are included. Other than T. S. Eliot and Ezra Pound, American poets are specifically excluded.

In fact, many found the selection of poets to be idiosyncratic. Late Victorians are strongly represented and Georgian poetry is covered quite thoroughly. The modernist tendency does not predominate, though it is not ignored. Yeats excludes most war poetry of the First World War, explaining his distaste by quoting Matthew Arnold: "passive suffering is not a theme for poetry".

Yeats represented his own friends generously, including Oliver St. John Gogarty and Shri Purohit Swami, as well as Margot Ruddock, with whom he was having a relationship. Gogarty is represented by seventeen poems, more than anybody else and three more than Yeats himself. He is also given a prominent position in the centre of the volume and praised in the introduction as "one of the great lyric poets of our age".

In all, the volume includes 97 writers and 379 poems. Of these, sixteen are Irish. Ten are women, with strong representation of those of the 1920s and 1930s, such as Frances Cornford, Vita Sackville-West, Edith Sitwell, Sylvia Townsend Warner and Dorothy Wellesley. Wellesley and Sitwell receive extensive praise in Yeats's introduction. Wellesley's poetry is given sixteen pages, more than Thomas Hardy (four) or W. H. Auden (five).

Yeats notes in his introduction that he was refused permission to include Robert Graves, Laura Riding, John Gray, and Sir William Watson, and that Rudyard Kipling and Ezra Pound were under-represented because of expense. He did not say which of their poems he would have included.

Yeats makes significant edits to some of his selections. He includes a piece of prose by Walter Pater, laying it out with line breaks in order to present it as a poem. He writes that "Only by printing it in vers libre can one show its revolutionary importance". He includes a severely edited version of The Ballad of Reading Gaol, asserting that having plucked "its foreign feathers it shows a stark realism akin to that of Thomas Hardy, the contrary to all its author deliberately sought. I plucked out even famous lines because, effective in themselves, put into the Ballad they become artificial, trivial, arbitrary".

== Reception ==
Critics noted many idiosyncrasies in Yeats's editorial choices, such as the exclusion of Wilfred Owen, the editing of The Ballad of Reading Gaol, the over-representation of Gogarty, and the exclusion of "The Love Song of J. Alfred Prufrock" and The Waste Land. W. H. Auden called the anthology "the most deplorable volume ever issued" under the imprint of the Clarendon Press. The Spectator wrote that it was neither authoritative not definitive and should have been called "Mr Yeats's Book of Modern Verse".

In a largely critical review of the anthology, Robert Hillyer in The Atlantic suggested that "The selections and omissions are as capricious as the Introduction". Hillyer wrote that Yeats had over-represented "the school of Eliot, the school of Edith Sitwell, and the school of Pound" because, while he did not like them, he was afraid of them. Hillyer also suggested that Yeats's own poetic convictions were absent: "Forty-five pages of introduction and over four hundred pages of text fail to record the taste or convictions of one of the best of our modern poets, the man who was awarded the Nobel Prize while Thomas Hardy was still living."

The Times Literary Supplement, on the other hand, reviewed it favourably, while in Ireland, in reviews for two journals, J. J. Hogan commended Yeats's negative attitude towards modernism.

The anthology became an instant bestseller, selling 15,000 copies in three months, and was reprinted many times.

More recently the anthology has been seen as giving "a sense of what poetry was actually like in the 1920s and 1930s, when modernism was still just one of a number of poetic possibilities". It has been argued that it offers "the same essentially neo-Romantic critique of modernity that can be found in Yeats's own poems" and responds to the modernist poets inspired by Eliot and Pound "with a more idiosyncratic version of what it meant to be modern". It has been compared, both favourably and unfavourably, with the Faber Book of Modern Verse, published in the same year.

== Poets in the Oxford Book of Modern Verse 1892–1935 ==
- Lascelles Abercrombie
- W. H. Auden
- George Barker
- Julian Bell
- Hilaire Belloc
- Laurence Binyon
- Edmund Blunden
- Wilfrid Scawen Blunt
- Gordon Bottomley
- Thomas Boyd
- Robert Bridges
- Rupert Brooke
- Joseph Campbell
- Roy Campbell
- G. K. Chesterton
- Richard Church
- Mary Elizabeth Coleridge
- Padraic Colum
- Alfred Edgar Coppard
- Frances Cornford
- William Henry Davies
- Edward Davison
- Walter de la Mare
- Ernest Dowson
- John Drinkwater
- T. S. Eliot
- Edwin John Ellis
- William Empson
- Michael Field
- James Elroy Flecker
- John Freeman
- Manmohan Ghose
- Wilfrid Gibson
- Oliver St. John Gogarty
- Augusta, Lady Gregory
- Julian Grenfell
- Thomas Hardy
- William Ernest Henley
- Frederick Robert Higgins
- Ralph Hodgson
- Gerard Manley Hopkins
- A. E. Housman
- Richard Hughes
- Lionel Johnson
- James Joyce
- Rudyard Kipling
- D. H. Lawrence
- Cecil Day-Lewis
- Hugh M'Diarmid
- Thomas MacGreevy
- Louis MacNeice
- Charles Madge
- John Masefield
- Edward Powys Mathers
- Alice Meynell
- Harold Monro
- Thomas Sturge Moore
- Henry Newbolt
- Robert Nichols
- Frank O'Connor
- Walter Pater
- Vivian de Sola Pinto
- William Plomer
- Ezra Pound
- Frederick York Powell
- Herbert Read
- Ernest Rhys
- Michael Roberts
- Thomas William Hazen Rolleston
- Margot Ruddock
- George William Russell
- Victoria Sackville-West
- Siegfried Sassoon
- Geoffrey Scott
- Edward Shanks
- Edith Sitwell
- Sacheverell Sitwell
- Stephen Spender
- J. C. Squire
- William Force Stead
- James Stephens
- Leonard Strong
- Frank Pearce Sturm
- Shri Purohit Swami
- Arthur Symons
- John Millington Synge
- Rabindranath Tagore
- Edward Thomas
- Francis Thompson
- Herbert Trench
- Walter James Turner
- Arthur Waley
- Sylvia Townsend Warner
- Dorothy Wellesley
- Oscar Wilde
- W. B. Yeats

== External sources ==
Oxford Book of Modern Verse 1892-1935 at the Internet Archive https://archive.org/details/in.ernet.dli.2015.459263
