= Aren't Men Beasts! =

1937 British film by Graham Cutts

- Directed by: Graham Cutts
- Written by: Marjorie Deans; William Freshman
- Based on: play by Vernon Sylvaine
- Produced by: Walter C. Mycroft
- Starring: Robertson Hare; Alfred Drayton; Billy Milton; June Clyde
- Cinematography: Roy Kellino
- Edited by: Monica Kimick
- Production company: British International Pictures
- Distributed by: Associated British
- Release date: 19 January 1937
- Running time: 66 minutes
- Country: United Kingdom
- Language: English

Aren't Men Beasts! (also known as Aren't Men Beasts) is a 1937 British comedy film directed by Graham Cutts and starring Robertson Hare, Alfred Drayton and Billy Milton. It was written by Marjorie Deans and William Freshman based on the play by Vernon Sylvaine.

== Premise ==
A number of people try to prevent a man getting married.

== Cast ==
- Robertson Hare as Herbert Holly
- Alfred Drayton as Thomas Potter
- Billy Milton as Roger Holly
- June Clyde as Marie
- Kathleen Harrison as Annie
- Ruth Maitland as Selina Potter
- Ellen Pollock as vamp
- Frank Royde as policeman
- Amy Veness as Mrs. Flower
- Victor Stanley as Harry Harper
- Charles Mortimer as detective
- Frederick Morant as George Deck
- Anne Boyd as Louise Baker
- Judy Kelly as Yvette Bingham

== Production ==
The film was made at Elstree Studios by British International Pictures. John Mead was art director.

== Reception ==
The Monthly Film Bulletin wrote: "A very broad farce-film version of the popular and successful stage play. ...The incidents are more ludicrous than humorous but the whole thing goes with a swing, and is certainly laughter-provoking. Robertson Hare is genuinely funny as the meek little dentist. He is supported by a thoroughly competent cast who work hard to produce the hilarity aimed at."

Kine Weekly wrote: "Transferred lock, stock, and barrel to the screen following a triumphant stage success, this unpretentious but breezy farcical comedy is just the stuff to give the masses. Ripe, yet harmless, innuendo vies with near-the-knuckle situations in a ceaseless fight for laughs, and the hilarious contest is augmented by really bright work on the part of a new British box-office team. Snap, rather than subtlety, is the key to the film's success. Cast-iron comedy bet for all classes."
