= And This Was Odd =

1951 play

- Written by: Kenneth Horne
- Original language: English
- Genre: Comedy

Premiere
- Date premiered: 2 October 1951
- Place premiered: Criterion Theatre, London

And This Was Odd is a 1951 comedy play by the British writer Kenneth Horne. It was a reworking of an earlier play Wasn't It Odd that had first been staged at the Intimate Theatre in Palmers Green in 1940. It involves an elderly lady who uncovers her family's secrets while supposedly ill in bed.

It ran for 54 performances at the Criterion Theatre in London's West End. The cast included Raymond Huntley, Peter Hammond, Avice Landone, Mary Jerrold and Mignon O'Doherty. It was directed by John Clements.

== Bibliography ==
- Wearing, J.P. The London Stage 1950-1959: A Calendar of Productions, Performers, and Personnel. Rowman & Littlefield, 2014.
