= A Lady Mislaid =

1958 British film by David MacDonald

- Lobby card
- Directed by: David MacDonald
- Written by: Frederick Gotfurt
- Based on: A Lady Mislaid by Kenneth Horne
- Produced by: Robert Hall
- Starring: Phyllis Calvert; Alan White; Thorley Walters; Gillian Owen
- Cinematography: Norman Warwick
- Edited by: Seymour Logie
- Music by: Sydney John Kay
- Production company: Welwyn Studios
- Distributed by: Associated British-Pathé (UK)
- Release date: 29 December 1958
- Running time: 60 minutes
- Country: United Kingdom
- Language: English

A Lady Mislaid is a 1958 British comedy film directed by David MacDonald and starring Phyllis Calvert, Alan White and Thorley Walters. It was written by Frederick Gotfurt based on the 1948 play of the same name by Kenneth Horne.

== Plot ==
Esther and her sister Jennifer are spinsters. Esther has bought a remote country cottage, and has invited her novelist sister to stay for recuperation. Esther hasn't told Jennifer that a policeman had called, earlier, had explained that the police wanted to search the house and gardens for the body of the former owner's wife, and that she'd agreed. When a human skeleton is unearthed in the chicken coop, the finger of suspicion points firmly at the previous occupant, Mr. Smith; till it is discovered to be from an ancient Briton.

== Cast ==
- Phyllis Calvert as Esther Williams
- Alan White as Det. Sgt. Bullock
- Thorley Walters as Smith
- Gillian Owen as Jennifer
- Richard Leech as George
- Constance Fraser as Mrs. Small
- Sheila Shand Gibbs as Betty

== Critical reception ==
The Monthly Film Bulletin wrote: "An attempt at a short comédie noire, thls film needs a more ruthless and macabre line in humour to exploit a promising situation. Conventional characters and a flagging plot produce, instead of the witty melodrama that might have emerged, a tame piece of make-believe."

The Radio Times gave the film two out of five stars, writing: "A quaint idea and a decent cast make perfectly respectable entertainment out of an hour-long British programmer, but there's not much more to be said for it."
