= The Red Beret =

1954 film by Terence Young

- Australian release poster
- Directed by: Terence Young
- Written by: Richard Maibaum; Sy Bartlett; Frank Nugent
- Based on: The Red Beret by Hilary Saint George Saunders
- Produced by: Irving Allen; Albert R. Broccoli
- Starring: Alan Ladd; Leo Genn; Susan Stephen; Harry Andrews; Donald Houston; Anthony Bushell; Patric Doonan; Stanley Baker; Lana Morris; Tim Turner
- Cinematography: John Wilcox
- Edited by: Gordon Pilkington
- Music by: John Addison
- Color process: Technicolor
- Production company: Warwick Films
- Distributed by: Columbia Pictures
- Release dates: 14 August 1953 (London/Suez Canal Zone); 30 December 1953 (New York City)
- Running time: 88 minutes
- Countries: United Kingdom; United States
- Language: English
- Budget: US$700,000
- Box office: US$8 million

The Red Beret (aka The Red Devils, The Big Jump and retitled Paratrooper for the US release) is a 1953 British-American war film directed by Terence Young and starring Alan Ladd, Leo Genn and Susan Stephen.

The Red Beret is the fictional story about Steve MacKendrick, an American who enlists in the British Parachute Regiment in 1940, claiming to be a Canadian. It was the first film made by Irving Allen and Albert R. Broccoli's Warwick Films, with many of the crew later working on various films for Warwick Films and Broccoli's Eon Productions. It is partly based on the 1950 non-fiction book with the same title written by Hilary St George Saunders, about the Parachute Regiment and its second operation, Operation Biting, in February 1942.

== Plot ==
Steve MacKendrick, nicknamed "Canada" because he claims he is from the country, volunteers in 1940 for the British military's parachute training facility. He has much more experience and leadership skills than he admits. Canada tries to become better acquainted with a pretty parachute rigger named Penny Gardner. She is initially put off by his attitude, but they eventually start dating. Both Penny and his new commander, Lieutenant Colonel John Snow, see potential (and a mystery that does not add up) in him, despite his strong efforts to avoid assuming any responsibility. Canada turns down Snow's offer to send him to officer school.

After completing parachute school, Canada's unit goes on a raid on the German radar station at Bruneval. An RAF radar expert, Flight Sergeant Box, accompanies the raiders to retrieve a key component to take back to Britain. The mission is a success, but Corporal Dawes, one of the men in Canada's outfit, hurts both his legs in the drop.

Back in Britain, after visiting Dawes, Canada is recognised by an American airman. He tells Penny that he resigned his commission from the USAAF after ordering his best friend and co-pilot to parachute out of their bomber when an experimental rocket got stuck. His friend was killed when his parachute did not open properly. Canada blamed himself and refuses any responsibility that might endanger anyone's life. When Snow confronts Canada with what he has learned (from a security investigation that he has ordered), Canada wrongly assumes that Penny told what she learned, and he breaks up with her. However just before he boards his plane on his next mission, they exchange a smile suggesting they have made up.

The unit's next operation involves attacking and destroying an airfield at Bône during the invasion of North Africa. With Snow wounded and the men trapped in a minefield, Canada must risk others to extricate the unit. One of his friends, Poleski, who is Polish, finds a bazooka, so he decides to use it to blow a path though the minefield. Canada, Poleski and Taffy Evans use it to extricate their unit, while Snow and the rest of the men cover them. Although Snow and most of the men get out, the regimental sergeant major Cameron dies from the wounds he received when he entered the minefield. Afterward, Canada promises to think about the commission Snow offered him.

== Cast ==
- Alan Ladd as Steve "Canada" McKendrick
- Leo Genn as Lt. Col. John Snow
- Susan Stephen as Penny Gardner
- Harry Andrews as R.S.M. Cameron
- Donald Houston as Taffy Evans
- Anthony Bushell as Major General Whiting
- Patric Doonan as Flash Gordon
- Stanley Baker as Sergeant Breton
- Lana Morris as "Pinky"
- Tim Turner as Rupert
- Michael Kelly as Corporal Dawes
- Anton Diffring as Poleski
- Thomas Heathcote as Alf
- Carl Duering as Rossi Stubbins
- John Boxer as Flight Sergeant Box
- Harry Locke as Medical Orderly
- Michael Balfour as American Sergeant
- Guido Lorraine as German Officer
- Walter Gotell as German Sentry (uncredited)

== Production ==
=== Development ===
The Red Beret was based on a non-fiction book by Hilary St George Saunders published in 1950. Film rights were bought by Irving Allen, who had a company with Albert R. Broccoli, Warwick Films. He was told he could get finance if they could get a star to play the lead role. In 1951, Allen originally announced Trevor Howard and Leo Genn for the leading roles. Saunders, who wrote the book, was to work on the screenplay, but he died during pre-production. Terence Young was signed to direct and write a script. The working title was The Red Devils. The Red Beret was originally intended to be a co-production between Warwick and RKO Pictures, but the two companies were unable to come to terms, so Warwick made a deal with Columbia instead.

Terence Young's original choice for the lead role of Steve "Canada" MacKendrick was former Second World War Para Richard Todd who turned the part down, saying "I did not like this script, probably because I was still rather serious-minded about anything to do with the Airborne Forces and thought it an over-fictionalised treatment." Ray Milland was also originally announced as landing the leading role. Former agent Broccoli knew that Alan Ladd was unhappy with Paramount, where he had worked for most of his career. Broccoli met Ladd and his wife and agent Sue Carol who agreed to a two-picture contract with Warwick. (This eventually covered three pictures.) Ladd was paid US$200,000, first class travel and accommodations for himself, his wife, their four children and their nurse, and 10 per cent of the gross receipts over US$2,000,000 for his 11 weeks work filming The Red Beret.

Ladd wanted work done on the script and recommended Richard Maibaum, with whom he had worked several times while at Paramount. Warwick hired him and this began a long professional relationship between Broccoli and Maibaum which later included the James Bond films. In addition to director Young and screenwriter Maibaum, camera operator Ted Moore and stuntman Bob Simmons worked extensively on future Warwick and Eon Productions films, as did actor Walter Gotell, who appeared as a German sentry. Johanna Harwood, who worked on the continuity, co-wrote the screenplays for the first two Bond films Dr. No and From Russia with Love.

Although there was some public criticism of an American playing the lead in a British war film, British cinema owners responded that Hollywood stars filled their cinema seats, unlike most local actors. Ladd himself explained that his character had enlisted in the Parachute Regiment to learn from them. The Parachute Regiment provided extras, facilities and locations at the RAF Abingdon Parachute School, Abingdon, Oxfordshire and at Trawsfynydd, North Wales. Studio work took place at Shepperton.

The female lead role of Penny Gardner was originally meant to be played by Dianne Foster but she was unable to make it due to a scheduling conflict. She was replaced by Susan Stephen.

Actor Leo Genn served in the British Army in World War II, reaching the rank of Lt. Colonel. Alan Ladd was initially attached to the American Air Force Film Unit but was discharged due to stomach disorders. Subsequently, he was classified as A1 but thanks to pressure from film studios, his draft was postponed and finally in 1945 was removed from the draft along with all men over 30.

Stanley Baker played an antagonist for Ladd. His performance was so well received he was reteamed with Ladd on Hell Below Zero.

=== Production ===
Filming started in September 1952.

The final budget was £209,980 plus $315,000 to cover the fees of Ladd, Allen and Broccoli, Maibaum and American publicity.

== Release ==
The film had a simultaneous premiere at the Empire Leicester Square in London and at Moascar in the Suez Canal Zone staged by the Army Kinema Corporation on 14 August 1953.

== Reception ==
=== Critical ===
Variety called the film "keenly interesting and suspensive... it should be a winner in any country that is not sated with war pix."

=== Box office ===
The Red Beret was a hit at the British box office. According to producer Allen, it recouped its cost from the British market alone. Filmink argued, "while local journalists clutched pearls at the idea of an American appearing in such a British story, the public seemed flattered. Warwick was off and running."

The film cost an estimated US$700,000 to make and grossed US$8 million worldwide. It earned 80,000,000 francs (US$225,000) in France. Variety reported it made $1,750,000 in rentals in the US and Canada by the end of 1954. In February 1956, Broccoli claimed it had earned £570,000 in the US.

=== Legacy ===
Filmmink argued the movie "established the Warwick formula – a foreign (i.e. non-American) setting, imported American male star and British male-co star, a prominent female love interest, an action-adventure story based on some pre-existing IP (a novel, or historical event, or combination of both), a solid pro director, an American screenwriter, and American investment (normally Columbia Studios)."
