= Women Aren't Angels =

- DVD cover
- Directed by: Lawrence Huntington
- Written by: Lawrence Huntington; Bernard Mainwaring; Vernon Sylvaine
- Based on: the play by Vernon Sylvaine
- Produced by: Warwick Ward
- Starring: Robertson Hare; Alfred Drayton
- Cinematography: Günther Krampf
- Edited by: Flora Newton
- Music by: Charles Williams (uncredited)
- Production company: Associated British
- Distributed by: Pathé Pictures International (UK)
- Release date: 18 January 1943 (UK)
- Running time: 85 minutes
- Country: United Kingdom
- Language: English

Women Aren't Angels is a 1943 black and white British comedy film directed by Lawrence Huntington and starring Aldwych Theatre farceurs Robertson Hare and Alfred Drayton, with Polly Ward and Joyce Heron. It was made at Welwyn Studios and based on the 1941 play of the same title by Vernon Sylvaine.

== Premise ==
Music publishers Wilmer Popday and Alfred Bandle find themselves unwittingly embroiled in an espionage adventure, when they go away on manoeuvres with the Home Guard.

== Cast ==
- Robertson Hare as Wilmer Popday
- Alfred Drayton as Alfred Bandle
- Polly Ward as Frankie Delane
- Joyce Heron as Karen
- Mary Hinton as Thelma Bandle
- Peggy Novak as Elizabeth Popday
- Ethel Coleridge as Mrs Featherstone
- Leslie Perrins as Schaffer
- Peter Gawthorne as Colonel

== Reception ==
The Monthly Film Bulletin wrote: "This is ridiculous stuff, of course, as farce should be, but of its sort very well produced and slickly directed, with the good performances from Alfred Drayton and Robertson Hare as the chief protagonists that we are led to expect. They are supported by an admirable cast."

Kine Weekly wrote: "Robertson Hare and Alfred Drayton are in good form as Popday and Bandle. ... The play covers the traditional Hare-Drayton gamut – there are undressings, female impersonations, Cockney asides and many broad, yet harmless, innuendoes, but the obvious is scrupulously avoided. The co-stars see that the spirited and versatile humour is given rollicking alternation."

Picture Show wrote: "Bright and breezy farce with those hilarious partners in trouble, Robertson Hare erg Alfred Drayton, as music publishers who find themselves mixed up with Fifth Columnists, complications coming from a Cockney evacuee. Their tribulations, both as Home Guards and husbands, provide uproarious fun,"
