= Women Aren't Angels (play) =

1941 play by Vernon Sylvaine

Women Aren't Angels is a 1941 play by the British writer Vernon Sylvaine and featured Robertson Hare, Alfred Drayton and Judy Kelly in its original cast.

It ran at the Strand Theatre in London for only 65 performances, considerably shorter than other Sylvaine farces featuring Hare and Drayton during the decade. On Broadway it was known as All Men Are Alike.

== Synopsis ==
The proprietors of a music shop try to conceal the presence of a young woman at one of their homes from their domineering wives. They also become involved in a German espionage plot while serving with the Home Guard.

== Film adaptation ==
In 1943 the play was turned into a film, directed by Lawrence Huntington at Welwyn Studios with both Hare and Drayton reprising their roles. It was noted as being one of the more successful British films at the box office that year.

== Bibliography ==
- Bordman, Gerrald. American Theatre: A Chronicle of Comedy and Drama, 1930-1969. Oxford University Press, 1996.
- Murphy, Robert. Realism and Tinsel: Cinema and Society in Britain 1939-48. Routledge, 1992.
- Wearing, J.P. The London Stage 1940-1949: A Calendar of Productions, Performers, and Personnel. Rowman & Littlefield, 2014.
