= David Rees Griffiths =

Welsh poet

David Rees Griffiths (6 November 1882 – 17 December 1953), also known by his bardic name of Amanwy, was a Welsh poet, and an older brother of politician Jim Griffiths.

Griffiths was born in Betws, Carmarthenshire, where his father was a blacksmith. He was the fifth of ten children. He spent his working life as a coal miner, beginning work in 1894 at the age of eight, after a brief education at the local primary school.

His father's smithy remained a gathering point for local intellectuals and political activists. On 28 January 1908 David was badly injured in a colliery explosion, which killed one of his brothers. In 1919 he published his first volume of poetry, Ambell Gainc.

The profits from the edited volume O Lwch y lofa: cyfrol o ganu gan chwech o lowyr Sir Gar (1924) went towards helping Rev. Gomer Morgan Roberts supplement his scholarship to Fircroft Adult College near Birmingham. Griffiths edited the volume of selected works from local miners it 'easily sold a thousand copies' for a shilling each and gave the 24 year old Roberts £30 to help support him. He also wrote a weekly column in The Amman Valley Chronicle entitled Colofn Cymry'r Dyffryn (column for the Welsh speakers of the valley) using the pen name Cerddetwr (one who wanders aimlessly).

In 1910, Griffiths won his first eisteddfod chair, going on to win a further fifty in local events. In the same year, his wife Margaret died of tuberculosis. Griffiths also had a career as a journalist, writing for the Amman Valley Chronicle and also for BBC Radio. In 1927, he travelled to South Africa along with his son Gwilym, who was suffering from the same disease from which Gwilym would die in 1935. In 1928, Griffiths became caretaker at the local grammar school.

"David" a short film based on Griffiths' life, was made as part of the celebrations for the Festival of Britain. Amanwy played himself. As a younger man, he was portrayed by Ieuan Davies, who would later marry the youngest of Griffith's two daughters, Marged Mallt. Griffiths' eldest daughter Menna Ruth would teach at the local nursery school. She died in 2013.

== Works ==
- Ambell Gainc (1919)
- 0 Lwch y Lofa (ed.) (1924)
- Caneuon Amanwy (1956)

== Sources ==
- Biography
- About the film, David
