= Judy Kelly =

Australian-British actress (1913–1991)

- Picturegoer postcard
- Born: Julie Aileen Kelly; 1 November 1913; Sydney, New South Wales, Australia
- Died: 22 October 1991 (aged 77); London, England, UK
- Occupation: Actress
- Years active: 1928–54

Julie Aileen Kelly (1 November 1913 – 22 October 1991), known professionally as Judy Kelly, was an Australian-born British actress. She arrived in Britain in 1932 after winning a competition organised by the Australian British Empire Films, which included 3 months tuition at the British International Studios at Elstree. She appeared in a number of films for British International Pictures during the 1930s. She was sometimes cast as a love interest for the comedian Leslie Fuller, and also appeared alongside the musical stars Gene Gerrard and Stanley Lupino.

She appeared in the 1941 stage musical Lady Behave. Other wartime stage roles include Vernon Sylvaine's Women Aren't Angels and Warn That Man.

Her final film was a supporting role in the comedy Warning to Wantons in 1949.

== Partial filmography ==
- Adam's Apple (1928) - Vamp
- Money Talks (1932) - His Daughter Rosie
- The Private Life of Henry VIII (1933) - Lady Rochford (uncredited)
- Crime on the Hill (1933) - Alice Green
- Mannequin (1933) - Heather Trent
- The Love Nest (1933) - Girl
- Their Night Out (1933) - Betty Oliphant
- L'argent par les fenêtres (1933)
- Hawleys of High Street (1933) - Millie Hawley
- The Black Abbot (1934) - Sylvia Hillcrist
- The Rise of Catherine the Great (1934) - Guest at Hunting Lodge (uncredited)
- The Four Masked Men (1934) - Patricia Brent
- Tiger Bay (1934) - Bar Girl
- The Luck of a Sailor (1934) - Lillie (uncredited)
- Anything Might Happen (1934) - Kit Dundas
- Royal Cavalcade (1935) - Girl
- Drake the Pirate (1935) - Donavera (uncredited)
- Captain Bill (1935) - Polly
- Things Are Looking Up (1935) - Opal
- Marry the Girl (1935) - Jane Elliott
- It's a Bet (1935) - Anne
- Charing Cross Road (1935) - Vera
- Under Proof (1936) - Corone
- The First Offence (1936) - Girl in Garage
- A Star Fell from Heaven (1936) - Flora
- The Limping Man (1936) - Olga Hoyt
- Aren't Men Beasts! (1937) - Yvette Bingham
- The Price of Folly (1937) - Frances
- Make-Up (1937) - Marien Hutton
- Over She Goes (1937) - Alice Mayhill
- The Last Chance (1937) - Mary Perrin
- Boys Will Be Girls (1937) - Thelma
- Jane Steps Out (1938) - Margot Kent
- Queer Cargo (1938) - Ann Warren
- Luck of the Navy (1938) - Cynthia Maybridge
- Premiere (1938) - Carmen Daviot
- At the Villa Rose (1940) - Celia Harland
- The Midas Touch (1940) - Lydia Brenton
- Dead Man's Shoes (1940) - Michelle Allain
- George and Margaret (1940) - Frankie
- Tomorrow We Live (1943) - Germaine Bertan
- Saloon Bar (1940) - Girl (uncredited)
- The Butler's Dilemma (1943) - Ann Carrington
- It Happened One Sunday (1944) - Violet
- Dead of Night (1945) - Joyce Grainger (segment "Linking Story") / (segment "The Hearse Driver")
- Dancing with Crime (1947) - Toni Masters
- Warning to Wantons (1949) - Mimi de Vaillant
