= The Last Straw (play) =

1937 play

- Original language: English
- Written by: Reginald Denham; Edward Percy
- Genre: Comedy

Premiere
- Date: 29 September 1937
- Place: Comedy Theatre, London

The Last Straw is a 1937 comedy play by the British writers Reginald Denham and Edward Percy.

Its London premiere was at the Comedy Theatre in the West End, running for 52 performances between 29 September 13 November 1937. The original cast included Richard Haydn, Marius Goring, Andre Morell, Tom Gill, Arthur Hambling, Lucie Mannheim and Anna Konstam.

== Bibliography ==
- Wearing, J.P. The London Stage 1930-1939: A Calendar of Productions, Performers, and Personnel. Rowman & Littlefield, 2014.
