= Julian Rose (entertainer) =

American comedian (1868–1935)

- Born: Julius Rosenzweig; 6 September 1868; New York City, U.S.
- Died: 13 September 1935 (aged 67); London, England
- Occupation: Comic monologuist

Julian Rose (born Julius Rosenzweig; 6 September 1868–13 September 1935) was an American-born Jewish comedian. From the 1910s he lived and worked in Britain, where he was usually billed as "Our Hebrew Friend".

== Biography ==
He was born in New York City, the son of immigrant Austrian Jews. In early adulthood, he worked as an accountant for the New York and Philadelphia Telephone and Telegraph Company, where he amused his colleagues with his impressions of older immigrant Jews learning to live in America. Some sources state that he was raised and worked in Philadelphia.

By the mid-1890s, he decided on a career as a comedian, and worked on the Keith-Albee vaudeville theatre circuit, with Yiddish-inflected patter and dialect parodies, spoken at up to two hundred words per minute. His early routines were based on long-established Jewish stereotypes – for example, he would "appear in exaggerated costume, including a bald-headed wig and a long beard" – and joked about the difficulties Jewish immigrants experienced in American society.

His most successful routine was the monologue, "Levinsky at the Wedding". He became popular among Jews and others, and he was one of the first Jewish comedians to record on phonograph cylinders, for Edison Records in 1903. In 1905, he starred in the comedy Fast Times in New York, on Broadway, but the show was heavily criticized for its insensitivity and dependence on outdated stereotypes. As a result, his act became less popular, and Rose was removed from bookings on the Keith-Albee theatre circuit a few years later.

He modified his style, and regularly performed in Britain as well as the United States, before moving to Britain on a more permanent basis in the 1910s. He appeared on variety bills at the London Palladium and elsewhere. According to Roger Wilmut, "his act – a character monologue telling a story well interspersed with gags – maintained its American atmosphere." He made recordings of "Levinsky at the Wedding" for the Columbia label in 1917, and from the mid-1920s appeared on BBC Radio, billed as a "Hebrew comedian" and later as "Our Hebrew Friend". In 1930 he presented his act at the Royal Variety Performance in front of King George V and Queen Mary. He appeared in the 1932 Gracie Fields film Looking on the Bright Side, and the same year took the lead role as Abe Pilstein in Money Talks, a comedy film about Jewish life in London.

Rose died in London in 1935, one week after his 67th birthday.

In 2025, Rose's vaudeville legacy saw a resurgence of interest. His great-grandson, Australian comedian David Rose, utilized the family's archival collection to create the stand-up show Our Hebrew Friend, which examined Rose's legacy and the role of Jewish humour in modern society. The show debuted at the Edinburgh Fringe in 2025, with further performances scheduled in 2026 across Australia.
