= Purohit Swami =

Indian Hindu teacher

Shri Purohit Swami (12 October 1882 – 1941) was a Hindu teacher from Maharashtra, India.

== Biography ==
Purohit was born Shankar Gajannan Purohit in Badnera, then in British India's Bombay Presidency, to a wealthy Marathi Brahmin family.

As a child he became proficient in Marathi, English, and Sanskrit. He was well educated, obtaining a B.A. in philosophy at Calcutta University in 1903 and a law degree from Deccan College and Bombay University.

As a teenager, he decided to be celibate (as a brahmacharya), but in 1908 he accommodated his parents' wishes and married Godu Bai. After the birth of daughters in 1910 and 1914, and a son in 1915, he resumed his vow of celibacy.

A year or two before his marriage, he met a young man four years older than himself named Natekar. Purohit says this meeting "was love at first sight," and Natekar, who later took the monastic name Bhagwan Shri Hamsa, became Purohit's guru.

In 1923 his guru directed him to embark on a mendicant pilgrimage the length and breadth of India. Begging bowl in hand, he passed several years in this way. He travelled to Europe on an extended visit in 1930.

== Friendship with Yeats ==
In 1931, Thomas Sturge Moore introduced Purohit to the Irish poet William Butler Yeats. The two men struck up a friendship which lasted until Yeats's death, collaborating on a number of literary projects.

Yeats wrote an introduction to Purohit's 1932 book, The Autobiography of an Indian Monk: His Life And His Adventures. In 1934, Purohit was mentioned in Bhagwan Shri Hamsa's book The Holy Mountain, supplemented with an introduction by Yeats. He worked with Yeats during 1935 and 1936, in Mallorca, on the translations to The Ten Principal Upanishads (1938, Faber and Faber), and in 1938 published his own version of Patanjali's Aphorisms of Yoga with a handful of illustrated yoga exercises and postures. Yeats included him in the Oxford Book of Modern Verse 1892–1935.

He translated the Bhagavad Gita into English. Unlike most translations, Purohit Swami's translates every word into English and avoids the use of Sanskrit concepts that may be unfamiliar to English-speakers, for example translating the word yoga as "spirituality". He also avoids mentioning the Varna (caste) system; where the original Gita mentions the different varnas he interprets this as different occupations within society.

== Legacy ==
He represents a very important but largely unremembered link between the generation of Swami Vivekananda and the post-World War II society in which Eastern thought has become an accepted element of spiritual life.

Purohit is known in the West principally for his work on translations of major Hindu texts. During his state visit in June 2023 to the US, Indian prime minister Narendra Modi presented the Bidens with a first edition print of the book The Ten Principal Upanishads (1937), translated from Sanskrit by Purohit Swami and Yeats.
