= One Wild Oat (play) =

1948 play

- Written by: Vernon Sylvaine
- Original language: English
- Genre: Comedy
- Setting: London, present day

Premiere
- Date premiered: 1948
- Place premiered: Garrick Theatre, London

One Wild Oat is a comedy play by the British writer Vernon Sylvaine which premiered in 1948. Its West End run was at the Garrick Theatre with direction by the veteran entertainer Jack Buchanan. It ran for 508 performances from December 1948 to February 1950. The cast originally included Robertson Hare and Alfred Drayton, who had appeared together in several of Sylvaine's farces and their subsequent film adaptations. In 1949, following the death of Drayton, his role was taken over first by Arthur Riscoe and then Hartley Power.

== Synopsis ==
Two feuding neighbors, a barrister and a bookmaker, join forces to try and prevent their secret pasts from coming back to haunt them.

== Film Adaptation ==
In 1951 the play was adapted into a film made at the Riverside Studios in Hammersmith and starring Robertson Hare and Stanley Holloway. The film featured a brief cameo role from Audrey Hepburn.

== Bibliography ==
- Wearing, J.P. The London Stage 1940-1949: A Calendar of Productions, Performers, and Personnel. Rowman & Littlefield, 2014.
