= Fools Rush In (1973 film) =

1973 British television documentary

Morecambe and Wise: Fools Rush In
- Produced by: Ronald Smedley
- Cinematography: Brian Tufano
- Edited by: Geoffrey Botterill
- Production company: BBC
- Release date: 18 February 1973
- Running time: 49 minutes
- Country: United Kingdom
- Language: English

Fools Rush In is a 1973 British fly-on-the-wall TV documentary about the double act Eric Morecambe and Ernie Wise, produced by Ronald Smedley for the BBC Omnibus arts series. It was first broadcast on 18 February 1973.

== Premise ==
The film follows Morecambe and Wise as they rehearse one of their BBC programmes, the seventh episode of their seventh series, which was broadcast on 16 February 1973 with guest stars Anita Harris and Anthony Sharp, both of whom appear in the documentary.

The programme is an insight into how the duo honed their material (written by Eddie Braben who is also interviewed) and how they run through bits of "business" with the guest stars, adding and subtracting material as they go. The sketches featured are also shown at the recording stage giving the viewer an insight as to how they developed from the page to the screen. Interviews are also included with the two stars and director John Ammonds who is also present at the script read-throughs.

The opening credits to the programme, accompanied by the Bring Me Sunshine theme tune are made in the style of old-fashioned variety handbills in the familiar red, white and blue liveries of the time.

Sections of this programme have been used in other Morecambe and Wise documentaries and the programme itself was repeated on BBC2 in the 1980s;

Of note is the fact that the title Fools Rush In was seen again in the pair's final work together Night Train To Murder in 1983 which was not broadcast until after Morecambe's death the following year.
