= As Long as They're Happy (play) =

1953 play

- Written by: Vernon Sylvaine
- Original language: English
- Genre: Comedy

Premiere
- Date premiered: 13 April 1953
- Place premiered: Grand Theatre, Blackpool

As Long as They're Happy is a comedy play by the British writer Vernon Sylvaine which was first staged in 1953. A successful hit, it ran at the Garrick Theatre in the West End for 370 performances between July 1953 and May 1954. Veteran entertainer Jack Buchanan directed and starred as a stockbroker trying to cope with the extravagant behaviour of his daughters. Other members of the cast included Dorothy Dickson, Nigel Green, David Hutcheson and Stephen Hancock.

== Film ==
In 1955 it was made into a musical film directed by J. Lee Thompson and with Buchanan reprising his starring role.

== Bibliography ==
- Chibnall, Steve. J. Lee Thompson. Manchester University Press, 2000.
- Wearing, J.P. The London Stage 1950-1959: A Calendar of Productions, Performers, and Personnel. Rowman & Littlefield, 2014.
