= Warn That Man! =

1941 play

- Original language: English
- Written by: Vernon Sylvaine
- Genre: Comedy thriller

Premiere
- Date: 15 December 1941
- Place: New Theatre, Oxford

Warn That Man! is a 1941 comedy thriller play by the British writer Vernon Sylvaine. A comedy-thriller, its plot concerns an attempt to kidnap wartime Prime Minister Winston Churchill from an English country house.

Having debuted at the New Theatre, Oxford, it then ran for 352 performances at the Garrick Theatre in the West End between December 1941 and September 1942. Amongst its cast were Gordon Harker, Veronica Rose, Basil Radford, Ethel Coleridge and Judy Kelly.

== Adaptation ==
In 1943 it was turned into a film directed by Lawrence Huntington and made at Welwyn Studios. Gordon Harker reprised his role from the play while Raymond Lovell and Jean Kent also starred.

== Bibliography ==
- Wearing, J.P. The London Stage 1940-1949: A Calendar of Productions, Performers, and Personnel. Rowman & Littlefield, 2014.
