= Will Any Gentleman? =

1950 play

- Original language: English
- Written by: Vernon Sylvaine
- Genre: Comedy
- Setting: London, present day

Premiere
- Date: 17 July 1950
- Place: Royal Court Theatre, Liverpool

Will Any Gentleman? is a 1950 stage farce by the British writer Vernon Sylvaine. The play was first performed at the Royal Court Theatre in Liverpool in July 1950. It then went on to the West End, running for 364 performances at the Strand Theatre between September 1950 and July 1951. It starred Robertson Hare, who appeared in several plays by Sylvaine. Hare plays a mild-mannered bank clerk who, after a night out, is hypnotized into a much more assertive lifestyle.

== Original cast ==
- Mendoza - Norman Scace
- Alfred Boyle - Wilfred Boyle
- Henry Stirling - Robertson Hare
- Dr. Smith - Charles Groves
- Detective-Inspector Martin - Henry Caine
- Charley Stirling - Arthur Riscoe
- Stanley Jackson - Hugh Metcalfe
- Montague Billing - Gerard Clifton
- Dancer - Patricia Dare
- Angel - Thelma Grigg
- Beryl - Natalie Raine
- Florence Stirling - Constance Lorne
- Honey - Pamela Deeming
- Mrs. Whittle - Ruth Maitland

== Film adaptation ==
In 1953 the play was adapted into a film directed by Michael Anderson. George Cole replaced Robertson Hare in the leading role.

== Bibliography ==
- Wearing, J.P. The London Stage 1950-1959: A Calendar of Productions, Performers, and Personnel. Rowman & Littlefield, 2014.
