= Charles Williams (composer) =

British composer and conductor (1893–1978)

- Born: Isaac Cozerbreit; 8 May 1893; London, England, UK
- Died: 7 September 1978 (aged 85); Findon Valley, Worthing, West Sussex, England, UK
- Education: Royal Academy of Music
- Occupations: Composer, conductor

Charles Williams (8 May 1893 – 7 September 1978) was a British composer and conductor, contributing music to over 50 films. While his career ran from 1934 through 1968, much of his work came to the big screen as stock music and was therefore uncredited.

== Biography ==
Williams was born in London as Isaac Cozerbreit in 1893. He began his career as a freelance violinist in theatres, cinemas and symphony orchestras and later studied composition with Norman O'Neill at the Royal Academy of Music. In 1933, he went to Gaumont British Films as composer and stayed there until 1939. He composed for many British films and radio shows and after the end of World War II, he became the conductor of the new Queen's Hall Light Orchestra. Later, he formed his own Concert Orchestra.

He died in Findon Valley, Worthing, West Sussex, aged 85.

== Light music compositions ==
He composed many orchestral pieces and marches for his ensembles, which were recorded in the "Mood Music" category of light music and during the 1950s became familiar as film and television signature themes, often in his own recordings:

- "Blue Devils" is a popular march and Williams' first success as a composer. It was originally published as "The Kensington March" and written for the opening of the Odeon in Kensington in 1926, where Williams conducted the cinema orchestra. When he left the cinema in 1928 the march was renamed "Blue Devils" and first published under that name in 1929, dedicated to the Territorial Army regiment Kensington Rifles.
- "Devil's Galop" was the theme tune to the radio serial Dick Barton.
- "The Young Ballerina" accompanied The Potter's Wheel, probably the most famous of the BBC's 1950s interludes.
- "The Old Clockmaker" was chosen as the radio theme to Jennings at School.
- "Girls in Grey", originally written for the Women's Junior Air Corps during World War II later became known as the BBC Television Newsreel theme.
- "High Adventure", adapted slightly, was used as the signature tune to BBC Radio 2's Friday Night is Music Night.
- "A Quiet Stroll" was used for BBC Television's Farming programme at its launch in 1957, as well as a more recent programme Tracks.
- "Rhythm on Rails" was often used in the BBC Morning Music programmes, but contrary to some reports, was not its signature tune.
- "Majestic Fanfare" (1935) was used by the Australian Broadcasting Corporation (ABC) for many years as the signature tune for its radio and television news broadcasts, beginning in 1952. A version as re-orchestrated by Richard Mills in 1988 is still used for radio news broadcasts as of 2020.

He also composed the popular piano concerto pastiche, "The Dream of Olwen", for the film While I Live.

== Film compositions ==
- The Citadel (1938)
- Hey! Hey! USA (1938)
- Strange Boarders (1938)
- They Came by Night (1940)
- Tower of Terror (1941)
- My Wife's Family (1941)
- Kipps (1941)
- The Night Has Eyes (1942)
- The Young Mr. Pitt (1942)
- Women Aren't Angels (1942)
- Warn That Man (1943)
- Thursday's Child (1943)
- Medal for the General (1944)
- English Without Tears (1944)
- The Way to the Stars (1945) (with Nicholas Brodszky)
- Carnival (1946)
- Quiet Weekend (1946)
- While I Live (1947)
- The Romantic Age (1949)
- The Doctor's Dilemma (1958)
- The Apartment (1960) ("Jealous Lover", first used in The Romantic Age, also known as "Theme from The Apartment")
