= Edward Percy Smith =

British politician (1891–1968)

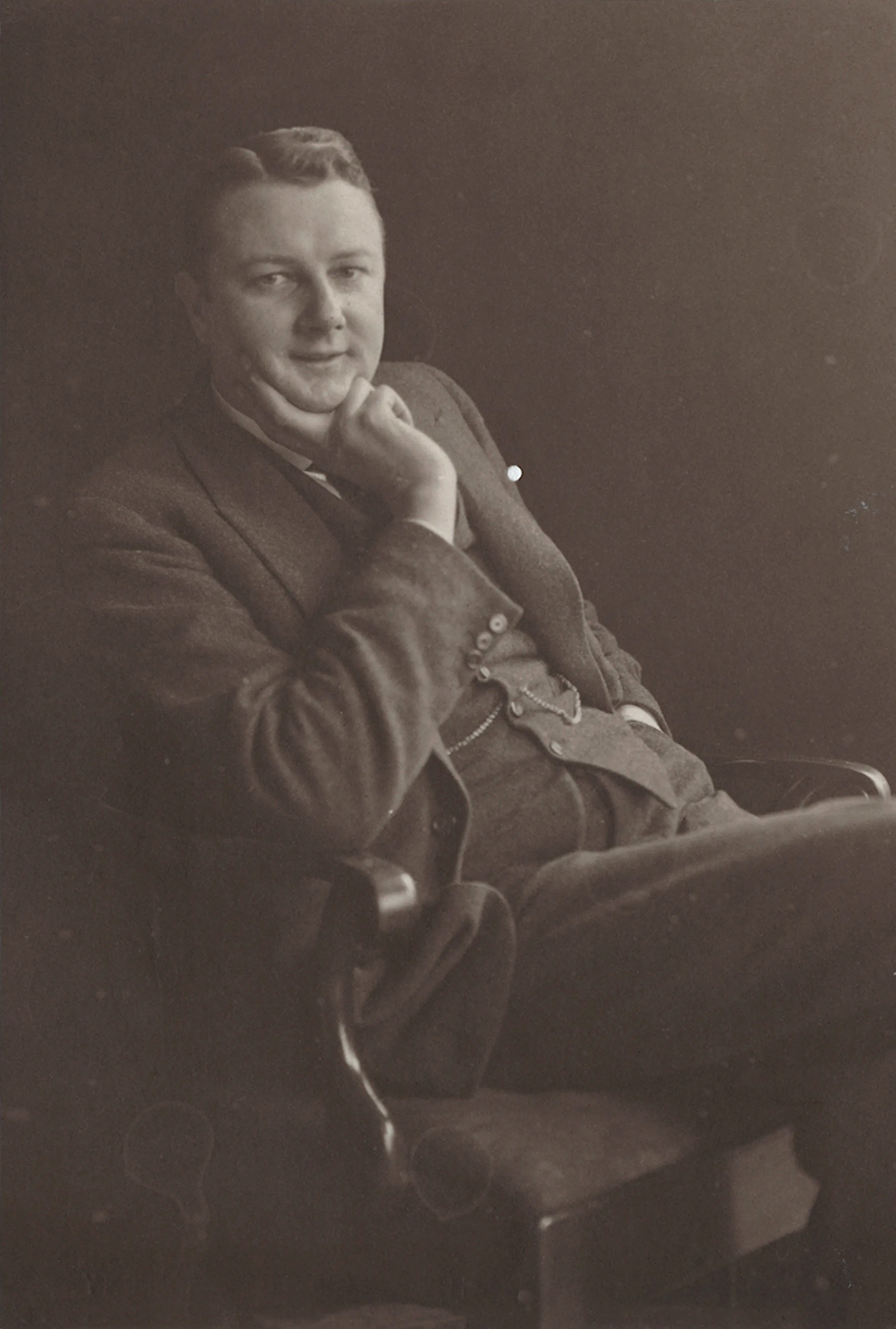
- Portrait by Olive Edis, c. 1925

Member of Parliament for Ashford
- In office 1943 – 23 February 1950
- Preceded by: Patrick Spens
- Succeeded by: Bill Deedes

Personal details
- Born: 5 January 1891 Wandsworth, London
- Died: 25 May 1968 (aged 77) Eastbourne, England
- Party: Conservative
- Spouse: Mary Newland

Edward Percy Smith (5 January 1891 – 25 May 1968) was a Conservative Party politician in the United Kingdom and a playwright under the name Edward Percy.

== Biography ==
Born in Wandsworth, London, he was elected as Member of Parliament (MP) for Ashford at a by-election in 1943, and held the seat until he stood down at the 1950 general election.

Under the name Edward Percy, he was a popular playwright. His plays included The Shop at Sly Corner and, with Reginald Denham, Ladies in Retirement. He also worked occasionally in television and film, including contributing to the screenplay for the 1960 Hammer horror film The Brides of Dracula. He died in Eastbourne aged 77.

Smith has earned mild infamy among biologists for releasing 12 specimens of the marsh frog in his garden at Stone-in-Oxney, Kent, during the winter of 1934–5. These escaped into a nearby mere, before steadily spreading. Today, it is regarded as an invasive species which eats the tadpoles of the common frog and which it widely succeeds.

== Selected plays ==
- The Last Straw (1937)
- Suspect (1937)
- The Shop at Sly Corner (1945)

Parliament of the United Kingdom
Preceded by Patrick Spens	Member of Parliament for Ashford; 1943–1950	Succeeded by Bill Deedes
