= Fools Rush In (1949 film) =

- Original British trade ad
- Directed by: John Paddy Carstairs
- Screenplay by: Geoffrey Kerr; Kenneth Horne
- Based on: a play by Kenneth Horne
- Produced by: Aubrey Baring
- Starring: Sally Ann Howes; Guy Rolfe; Nigel Buchanan; Nora Swinburne
- Cinematography: Geoffrey Unsworth
- Edited by: Jack Harris; George Clark
- Music by: Wilfred Burns
- Production company: Pinewood Films
- Distributed by: GFD (UK)
- Release date: 23 May 1949 (UK)
- Running time: 82 minutes
- Country: United Kingdom
- Language: English

Fools Rush In is a 1949 British comedy film directed by John Paddy Carstairs and starring Sally Ann Howes, Guy Rolfe and Nigel Buchanan.

== Plot ==
Pamela Dickson (Sally Ann Howes) is about to marry her fiancé Joe Trent (Nigel Buchanan), when her long-lost father (Guy Rolfe) arrives. Ostensibly a cad, he turns out to be just the opposite, so she immediately puts her own plans on hold to arrange a reconciliation between her father and mother (Nora Swinburne) before marrying her beloved Joe.

== Cast ==
- Sally Ann Howes as Pamela Dickson
- Guy Rolfe as Paul Dickson
- Nigel Buchanan as Joe Trent
- Nora Swinburne as Angela Dickson
- Esma Cannon as Mrs. Atkins
- Raymond Lovell as Sir Charles Leigh
- Thora Hird as Mrs. Coot
- Peter Hammond as Tommy
- Patricia Raine as Millicent
- Charles Victor as Mr. Atkins
- Nora Nicholson as Mrs. Mandrake
- Guy Verney as Clergyman
- Jonathan Field as Organist
- David Liney as Flower Boy
- George Mansfield as Car Driver

== Critical reception ==
TV Guide called it "A redundant film which only fools would rush in to see"; while Allmovie noted, "Fools Rush In is as light as a feather, but it pleases the crowd."
