= Derek Farr =

English actor (1912–1986)

- Born: Derrick Capel Farr; 7 February 1912; Brentford, Middlesex, England
- Died: 21 March 1986 (aged 74); Hillingdon, London, England
- Occupation: Actor
- Spouses: Carole Lynne (m. 1939; div. 1945) Muriel Pavlow (m. 1947)

Derrick Capel Farr (7 February 1912 – 21 March 1986) was an English actor who appeared regularly in British films and television from 1938 until his death in 1986. His more famous roles include Group Captain John Whitworth in The Dam Busters.

== Career ==
After working as a schoolteacher, he took to the stage in 1937, and in 1938 got his first film role. He served in the Second World War, and after the war resumed his acting career, mainly in character parts. He did, however, continue to appear as male leads and second male leads (with above-the-title billing) in a number of films in the late 1940s and 1950s, including Noose (1948), Murder Without Crime (1950) and Young Wives' Tale (1951). In 1952 he appeared in the West End in the thriller Murder Mistaken by Janet Green.

In the early 1980s he played 16 roles in The War of the Roses cycle in the BBC Television Shakespeare series.

== Personal life ==
His second marriage was in 1947 to actress Muriel Pavlow, whom he met in 1941 while filming Quiet Wedding, and again on the set of The Shop at Sly Corner (1947). Their maid of honour was Glynis Johns, with whom they had both performed in Quiet Wedding. They remained married until Farr's death in March 1986, aged 74.

== Partial filmography ==
- Miracles Do Happen (1938) – Greenlaw's Secretary (uncredited)
- The Outsider (1939) – (uncredited)
- Q Planes (1939) – Minor Role (uncredited)
- Black Eyes (1939) – Minor Role (uncredited)
- Inspector Hornleigh on Holiday (1939) – Bridge Club Member (uncredited)
- Freedom Radio (1941) – Hans
- Quiet Wedding (1941) – Dallas Chaytor
- Spellbound (AKA ' Passing Clouds ') (1941) – Laurie Baxter
- Wanted for Murder (1946) – Jack Williams
- Quiet Weekend (1946) – Denys Royd
- Teheran (1946) – Pemberton Grant
- Code of Scotland Yard (1947) – Robert Graham
- Bond Street (1948) – Joe Marsh
- Noose (1948) – Capt. Jumbo Hyde
- The Story of Shirley Yorke (1948) – Gerald Ryton
- Silent Dust (1949) – Maxwell Oliver
- Man on the Run (1949) – Sgt. Peter Burden, alias Brown
- Double Confession (1950) – Jim Medway
- Murder Without Crime (1950) – Stephen
- Young Wives' Tale (1951) – Bruce Banning
- Reluctant Heroes (1952) – Michael Fone
- Little Big Shot (1952) – Sergeant Wilson
- Front Page Story (1954) – Teale
- Eight O'Clock Walk (1954) – Peter Tanner
- Bang! You're Dead (1954) – Detective Grey
- The Dam Busters (1955) – Group Captain J. N. H. Whitworth, D.S.O., D.F.C.
- Value for Money (1955) – Duke Popplewell
- The Man in the Road (1956) – Ivan Mason / Dr. James Paxton
- Town on Trial (1957) – Mark Roper
- Doctor At Large (1957) – Dr. Potter-Shine
- The Vicious Circle (1957) – Kenneth Palmer
- The Truth About Women (1957) – Anthony
- Television Playwright (1958, TV series) – William Faraday
- Attempt to Kill (1961) – Det. Insp. Minter
- Deadline Midnight (1961) – Paul Vetter
- The Saint (1962, TV series) – John Clarron / Mrs. Jafferty
- The Human Jungle
- The Projected Man (1966) – Inspector Davis
- 30 Is a Dangerous Age, Cynthia (1968) – TV Announcer
- The Johnstown Monster (1971) – Hamer
- Pope Joan (1972) – Count Brisini
- Crossroads (1972–1973, TV series) – Timothy Hunter
- Nightingale's Boys (1975, TV Series) – Bill Nightingale
- Star Maidens (1976, TV series) – Professor Evans
- Blake's 7 (1978, TV series) – Professor Ensor
- Some Mothers Do 'Ave 'Em (1978, TV series) – Dr Mender
- Rumpole of the Bailey - Rumpole and the Man of God - (1979) - Rev Mordred Skinner
- We, the Accused (1980, TV series) – Sir Kenneth Eddy
