= Vernon Sylvaine =

British playwright and screenwriter (1896–1957)

- Born: 9 August 1896; Manchester, Lancashire; United Kingdom
- Died: 22 November 1957 (aged 61); Sussex, United Kingdom
- Other name: William Vernon Scotchburn
- Occupation: Writer

Vernon Sylvaine (1896–1957) was a British playwright and screenwriter. He is known for writing several popular stage farces. He began working in film in 1937 when his stage hit Aren't Men Beasts! was turned into a film of the same title starring Robertson Hare and Alfred Drayton. Hare and Drayton starred in two further adaptations of his plays A Spot of Bother (1938) and Women Aren't Angels (1943). He adapted his own play for the 1943 comedy-thriller Warn That Man starring Gordon Harker, Basil Radford and Judy Kelly. His 1948 play One Wild Oat was turned into a 1951 film of the same title.

He was the father of the actress June Sylvaine.

== Selected filmography ==
- Aren't Men Beasts! (1937)
- Make It Three (1938)

== Selected plays ==
- Aren't Men Beasts!
- A Spot of Bother
- Nap Hand (1940)
- Women Aren't Angels (1941)
- Warn That Man! (1941)
- Madame Louise (1945)
- One Wild Oat (1948)
- Will Any Gentleman? (1950)
- As Long as They're Happy (1953)

== Bibliography ==
- Murphy, Robert. British Cinema and the Second World War. A&C Black, 2005.
