= Muriel Pavlow =

British actress (1921–2019)

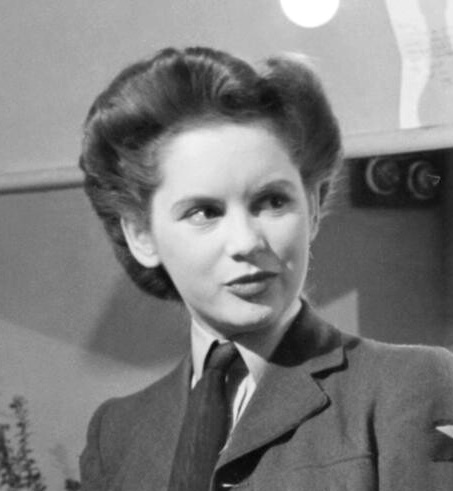
- Pavlow in her dressing room at the Globe Theatre in 1945, London, dressed in WAAF uniform for her role in While the Sun Shines.
- Born: Muriel Lilian Pavlow; 27 June 1921; London, England
- Died: 19 January 2019 (aged 97); London, England
- Occupation: Actress
- Years active: 1934–2009
- Spouse: Derek Farr (m. 1947; died 1986)

Muriel Lilian Pavlow (27 June 1921 – 19 January 2019) was a British actress. Her mother was French and her father Russian.

== Early life ==
Muriel was born in Lewisham, south-east London, to Boris Pavlov, a Russian émigré and salesman, and his French wife Germaine. They changed their name to Pavlow to sound more British. She grew up in Rickmansworth, Hertfordshire, and was educated at Colne Valley school in Rickmansworth and in Lausanne (Switzerland).

== Film and television career ==
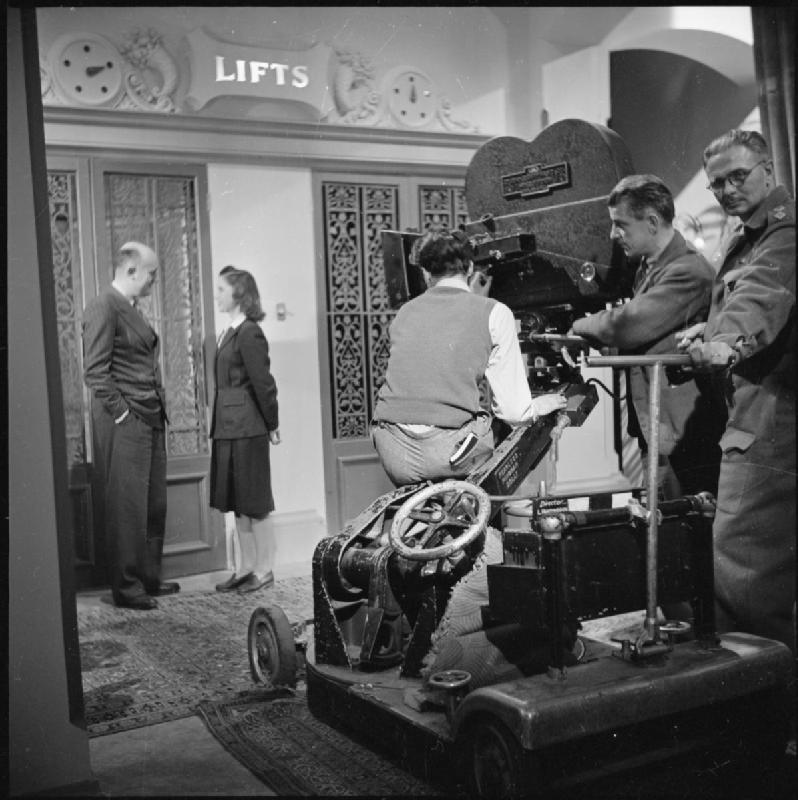
Pavlow on the set of Night Boat to Dublin (1946)

Pavlow began work as a child actress with John Gielgud and the Shakespeare Memorial Theatre in Stratford-upon-Avon. She started acting at an early age and her first, brief, film appearance came at the age of 13 in the Gracie Fields morale-boosting musical Sing As We Go (1934).

In December 1937, at sixteen, she played the role of Gretel in a BBC Television production of Hansel and Gretel, a pioneer BBC television broadcast. She was able to claim, when in her 90s, that she had made the earliest TV appearance of anyone living.

This was followed by a role as a young girl in Dodie Smith's Dear Octopus (1938), with John Gielgud and Marie Tempest at the Queen's theatre, London.

During the Second World War, she was in ENSA and also made the crossover from theatre to screen. In 1941 she starred in John Van Druten's play Old Acquaintance in the West End.

Pavlow's film roles include Maria, the young Maltese woman, in Malta Story (1953), with Alec Guinness; Joy, the girlfriend of Simon Sparrow, in Doctor in the House (1954) and Thelma Bader, the wife of the fighter pilot Douglas Bader (played by Kenneth More) in Reach for the Sky (1956).

She co-starred on stage with Derek Farr in Odd Man In in 1957 and a Kenneth Horne comedy, Wolf's Clothing, in 1959. She made two trips to Australia, first in 1959–60, touring in Odd Man In, and secondly in 1964–65, again with Farr. She played the daughter of an irascible curmudgeon (played by fellow Doctor in the House cast member, James Robertson Justice) in Murder, She Said (1961).

Later, offers of work in film dried up, but Pavlow continued to pursue her theatrical career. In the 1954–55 season, as a member of the Royal Shakespeare Company at Stratford-upon-Avon, she played the two Biancas in Othello and The Taming of the Shrew, Titania in A Midsummer Night's Dream and Cressida in Troilus and Cressida.

Other plays included her Critics' Choice portrayal of Miss Marple at the Vaudeville and Murder in the Vicarage at the Fortune Theatre in 1979. She appeared in Terence Rattigan's In Praise of Love in South Africa and again during 1974-1975 for performances at the Theatre Royal, Windsor. Another notable appearance was her quietly dignified portrayal of Madame de Rosemond in 'Les Liaisons Dangereuses' at the English Theatre of Vienna in 2003. She also appeared on television in character roles, including Queen Victoria in The Ravelled Thread (1978), in addition to small parts on popular TV series' including The Bill, House of Cards, Men Behaving Badly and Black Books.

She made many TV appearances over the years, notably making a cameo appearance as Queen Victoria in Southern Television's The Ravelled Thread (1980). She appeared in the original House of Cards political trilogy ("The Final Cut", 1995) lobbying the Prime Minister as an Age Concern campaigner, the serial Belonging (2004), starring Brenda Blethyn and was interviewed for the documentary series on BBC Two, British Film Forever. In 2007, she guest-starred in the audio play Sapphire and Steel: Cruel Immortality and had a cameo in Glorious 39 (2009).

At a British Film Institute career interview in 2009, she chose Reach for the Sky (1956) as the film she most wanted to be representative of her acting work. She had read Paul Brickhill's biography of aviation hero Douglas Bader and had pursued the role of his wife Thelma.

== Personal life ==
Pavlow married actor Derek Farr in 1947. They met in 1941 during the shooting of Quiet Wedding and again at the set of The Shop at Sly Corner in 1947. Their maid of honour was Glynis Johns, with whom they had both performed in Quiet Wedding. They had no children and remained married until his death in 1986. She is survived by three nieces and two nephews.

Pavlow was inducted into the actors' care home and charity Denville Hall and was active on its management committee. She lived there before a short illness that resulted in her death aged 97.

== Selected filmography and television roles ==
- Sing As We Go (1934)
- Hansel and Gretel (1937, TV Movie) – Gretel
- A Romance in Flanders (1937)
- John Halifax (1938) – John as a Boy (uncredited)
- Quiet Wedding (1941) – Miranda
- Night Boat to Dublin (1946) – Marion Decker
- Peter and Paul (1946, TV Movie) – Gerda as a woman
- Code of Scotland Yard (originally released as The Shop at Sly Corner) (1947) – Margaret Heiss
- Weep for the Cyclops (1947, TV Movie) – Esther Vanhomrigh (Vanessa)
- Hamlet, Part 1 and Hamlet, Part 2 (1947, TV Movie) – Ophelia
- Spring at Marino (1951, TV Movie) – Katia
- Breakers Ahead (1951, TV Movie) – Petronella
- Out of True (1951, Short) – Betty
- The Mollusc (1951, TV Movie) – Miss Roberts
- It Started in Paradise (1952) – Alison
- The Net (1953) – Caroline Cartier
- Malta Story (1953) – Maria Gonzar
- Doctor in the House (1954) – Joy Gibson
- Conflict of Wings (1954) – Sally
- Simon and Laura (1955) – Janet Honeyman
- Reach for the Sky (1956) – Thelma Bader
- Eyewitness (1956) – Lucy Church
- Tiger in the Smoke (1956) – Meg Elgin
- Doctor at Large (1957) – Dr. Joy Gibson
- Rooney (1958) – Maire Hogan
- Whirlpool (1959) – Dina
- Murder, She Said (1961) – Emma
- The Last Evensong (1985, TV Movie) – Miss. Marshall
- Boon (1988, TV Series) "Beef Encounter" - Barbara Drake
- Screen Two: Memento Mori (1992, TV Movie) - Grannie Valvona
- Daisies in December (1995, TV Movie) – Miss Dean
- Agatha Christie’s Poirot (1996, TV Series) “Dumb Witness” - Julie Tripp
- Heaven on Earth (1998, TV Movie) – Elizabeth McKenzie
- Black Books (2000, TV Series) “Cooking the Books” - Old Woman
- Hotel! (2001, TV Movie)
- Perfect Strangers (2001, TV Mini-Series) - Violet
- Coupling (2002, TV Series) “Faithless” - Angela
- Belonging (2004, TV Movie) – Dorothy
- Glorious 39 (2009) – Old Anne (final film role)

== Radio ==
A Life of Bliss (1967), as Tina Holiday, with George Cole (actor) and Colin Gordon.
