= Kenneth Horne (writer) =

British writer (1900–1975)

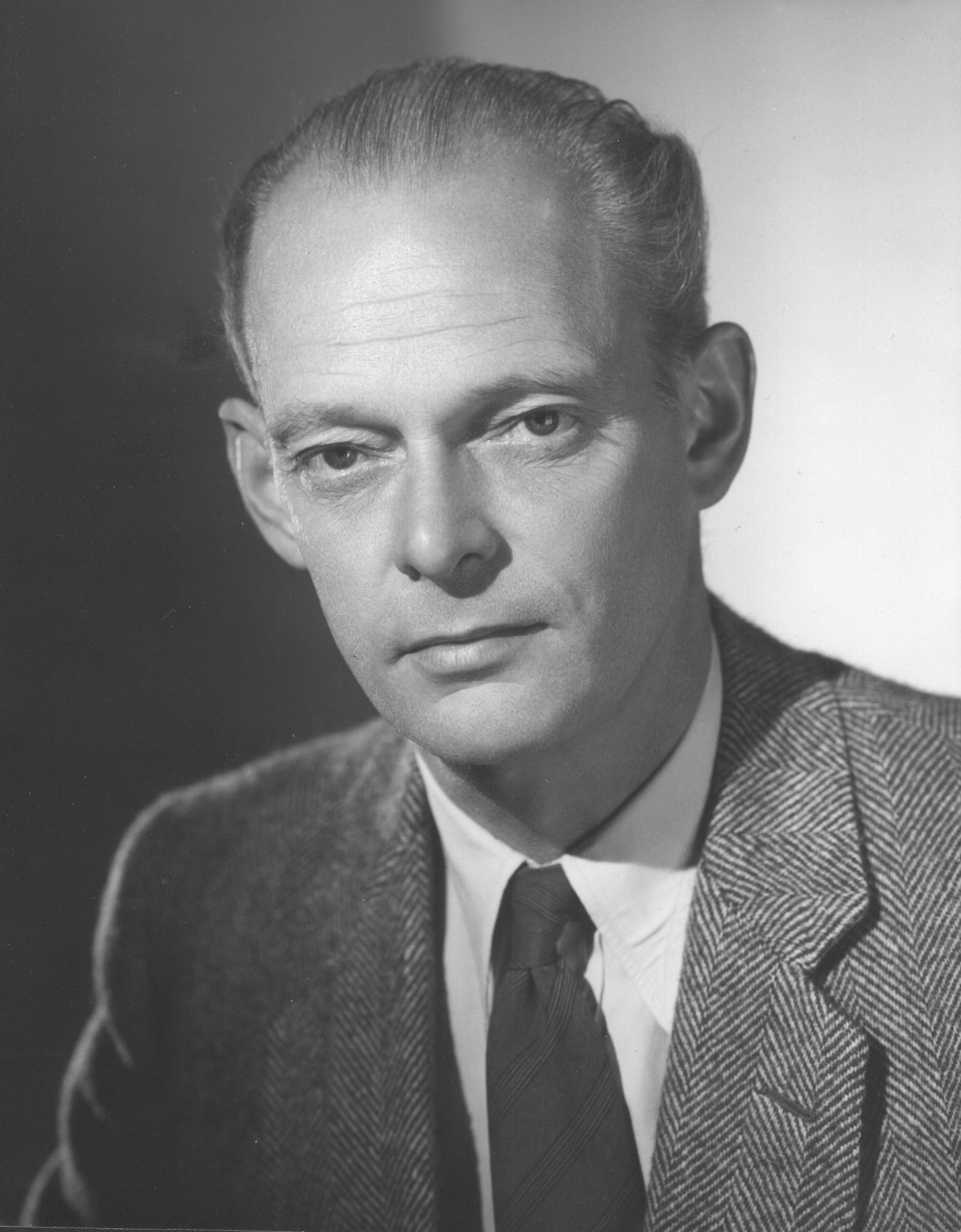
Horne, undated

Kenneth Horne (28 April 1900 – 5 June 1975) was an English writer and playwright. Born in Westminster, London, he was active between 1933 and 1970, and his works included A Lass and a Lackey, Fools Rush In, Trial and Error, Public Mischief and The Coming-Out Party, as well as film scripts. (He should not be confused with popular radio comedian Kenneth Horne of a similar age-group.)

== Biography ==
Kenneth Horne was born in Westminster, London, on 28 April 1900. He read many works by George Bernard Shaw, and later the two men shared the same manager. During the Second World War, Horne worked in the Air Ministry.

Horne was married twice and had three sons, antiquities dealer Jonathan Horne, who was born on 13 November 1940 in Cornwall, Christopher, and Nicolas; Horne also had a daughter, Judith. He spent some time living in Croydon, Surrey.

Horne's first play to be performed in the West End of London was in 1934. In 1940 Horne wrote The Good Young Man, about a missionary's son from Papua New Guinea who goes to England to visit his family and find a wife. This was followed in 1941 with Love In A Mist, about a secretary and her boss' son who go on a weekend in Exmoor, only for the secretary to attempt to escape from her date. Horne's last play to be performed at the West End, A Public Mischief, ran in St Martin's Theatre in 1965. The play was about a woman who elopes with her lover while making her escape appear to be a boating accident. Though it received poor reviews, this play was later adapted to television. Horne's last play, The Coming Out Party, was performed in Bromley in 1970.

Horne made his film debut as a screenwriter in 1938's Almost a Honeymoon, adapting the farce of the same name by Walter Ellis. He wrote three further screenplays or scripts: Two Dozen Red Roses, a 1952 BBC television adaptation from a work by Italian screenwriter Aldo de Benedetti; Aunt Clara in 1954, and On the Bridon Beat in 1964. Horne also recorded voice commentary, sometimes as a narrator, for several films and shorts, including in The Fibre Web (1963), The Story of Moses (1964), and Down Boy! (1964). He managed the dialogue for Fools Rush In, a 1949 comedy directed by John Paddy Carstairs.

Horne died of cancer on 5 June 1975.

== Themes ==
Horne's work often dealt with conflicting 19th and 20th century values, as well as the opposition of instinct and morality. As with his contemporary, Noël Coward, Horne challenged traditional speech patterns in British comedies, though where Coward's characters remain outrageous, Horne's ultimately return to what is expected from society.

Many of Horne's plays feature young, often virginal women who, in their burgeoning sexuality, "offer themselves up, with some degree of apprehension, for ravishment." Actor George Cole, who appeared in the West Side run of A Public Mischief, wrote of Horne's style: "Kenneth Horne's scripts were always carefully crafted to let the humour come naturally without being forced. He insisted that, in order to work properly, comedy should always be played straight".

== Legacy ==
Horne's grandson, the English writer Robert Farrar, describes Horne as

"school-of-Moliere, a pleaser, an artist of the depression and the war years whose brief was to make an audience feel safe and loved. You could put on your nicest clothes, turn up at the theatre and know beyond a shadow of a doubt that you were going to have good time."

== Partial bibliography ==
The following list is derived from Horne's published work, as catalogued at WorldCat.

- Yes and No, A Comedy in Two Acts and an Epilogue. London: French. 1938. OCLC 2454639.
- The Good Young Man: A Comedy in Three Acts. London: English Theatre Guild. 1940. OCLC 13000149.
- Love in a Mist: A Comedy in Three Acts. London: French. 1942. OCLC 12599699.
- Jane Steps Out: A Comedy in Three Acts. London: French. 1945. OCLC 12633177.
- Fools Rush In: A Comedy in Three Acts. London: French. 1947. OCLC 12952617.
- Two Dozen Red Roses. London: English Theatre Guild. 1950. OCLC 3528682. (adapted from a work by Aldo De Benedetti)
- A Lady Mislaid: A Comedy in Two Acts. London: English Theatre Guild. 1950. OCLC 12593112. (filmed in 1958)
- And This Was Odd: A Comedy in Three Acts. London: English Theatre Guild. 1952. OCLC 12580977. (also known as Wasn't It Odd?)
- Sleeping Partnership: A Comedy in Two Acts. London: English Theatre Guild. 1952. OCLC 13000832.
- The Badger Game: A Short Play in One Act. London: English Theatre Guild. 1953. OCLC 12643019.
- Trial and Error: A Comedy in Three Acts. London: French. 1954. OCLC 12596501.
- The Devil Was Sick. London: French. 1957. OCLC 12599693.
- Wolf's Clothing: A Comedy in Three Acts. London: French. 1959. OCLC 13000509.
- A Public Mischief: A Comedy in Two Acts. London: English Theatre Guild. 1965. OCLC 12047453.
