= Alfred Drayton =

British actor (1881–1949)

- Born: Alfred Varick; 1 November 1881; Brighton, Sussex, England
- Died: 26 April 1949 (aged 67); London, England
- Years active: 1916–1947

Alfred Drayton (1 November 1881 – 26 April 1949) was a British stage and film actor.

Drayton worked in a brewery when he was 18 but having a good deal of amateur dramatics experience decided to go on stage. His first appearance on stage was The Beloved Vagabond at Cardiff in 1908 and his London debut was at the Haymarket Theatre the following year. He featured in several West End plays before going into films, including Bulldog Drummond (1921) and Dear Brutus in 1922. He starred in the 1931 musical For the Love of Mike.

On both screen and stage he had a successful partnership with the actor Robertson Hare a veteran of the Aldwych Farces. He was appearing with Hare in the play One Wild Oat at the Garrick Theatre at the time of his death in 1949.

== Filmography ==
- Iron Justice (1915)
- A Little Bit of Fluff (1919)
- A Temporary Gentleman (1920)
- The Honeypot (1920)
- Love Maggy (1921)
- A Scandal in Bohemia (1921)
- The Squeaker (1930)
- The W Plan (1930)
- Brown Sugar (1931)
- The Happy Ending (1931)
- The Calendar (1931)
- Lord Babs (1932)
- It's a Boy (1933)
- Falling for You (1933)
- The Little Damozel (1933)
- Friday the Thirteenth (1933)
- Red Ensign (1934)
- Jack Ahoy (1934)
- Lady in Danger (1934)
- Radio Parade of 1935 (1934)
- Oh, Daddy! (1935)
- Look Up and Laugh (1935)
- Me and Marlborough (1935)
- The Dictator (1935)
- First a Girl (1935)
- Tropical Trouble (1936)
- The Crimson Circle (1936)
- Aren't Men Beasts! (1937)
- A Spot of Bother (1938)
- So This Is London (1939)
- The Big Blockade (1942)
- Banana Ridge (1942)
- Women Aren't Angels (1943)
- Don't Take It to Heart (1944)
- The Halfway House (1944)
- They Knew Mr. Knight (1946)
- Things Happen at Night (1947)
- Nicholas Nickleby (1947)
