= Sid James filmography =

The Sid James filmography presents a chronology of motion picture and television appearances of the South African-born British-based actor and comedian Sid James, who worked extensively in the British film and television industries from 1947 until his death in 1976. He is best remembered for his roles in the Carry On franchise, appearing in 19 of the series' films between 1960 and 1974; he also appeared in The Lavender Hill Mob (1951), The Titfield Thunderbolt (1953) and Trapeze (1956). He was usually credited as Sidney James, unless stated differently below.

James also gained recognition for his regular roles in sitcoms, as criminally-inclined Sidney Balmoral James in both Hancock's Half Hour (1956–1960) and Citizen James (1960–1962), and as put-upon patriarch Sid Abbott in Bless this House (1971–1976).

== Film ==
Year	Title	Role	Director	Other Players	Notes
1947	Black Memory	Eddie Clinton	Oswald Mitchell	Michael Atkinson, Myra O'Connell, Michael Medwin	Credited as "Sydney James"
1947	The October Man	Man at Railway Bridge	Roy Ward Baker	John Mills, Joan Greenwood	Uncredited role
1947	Night Beat	Nixon	Harold Huth	Anne Crawford, Maxwell Reed, Ronald Howard	
1948	No Orchids for Miss Blandish	Ted	St John Legh Clowes	Jack La Rue, Hugh McDermott, Linden Travers	Uncredited role; released in the US as Black Dice
1948	It's Hard to Be Good	Platform guard	Jeffrey Dell	Anne Crawford, Jimmy Hanley, Raymond Huntley	Uncredited role
1949	Once a Jolly Swagman	Rowton	Jack Lee	Dirk Bogarde, Bonar Colleano, Bill Owen, Thora Hird	Released in the US as Maniacs on Wheels
1949	The Small Back Room	Knucksie Moran	Michael Powell; Emeric Pressburger	David Farrar, Kathleen Byron, Jack Hawkins	Released in the US as Hour of Glory
1949	Paper Orchid	Freddy Evans	Roy Ward Baker	Hugh Williams, Hy Hazell, Garry Marsh	
1949	Give Us This Day	Murdin	Edward Dmytryk	Sam Wanamaker, Lea Padovani, Kathleen Ryan, Bonar Colleano	Released in the US as Christ in Concrete
1950	The Man in Black	Henry Clavering / Hodson	Francis Searle	Betty Ann Davies, Sheila Burrell, Anthony Forwood	
1950	Last Holiday	Joe Clarence	Henry Cass	Alec Guinness, Beatrice Campbell, Kay Walsh, Bernard Lee	
1950	The Lady Craved Excitement	Carlo	Francis Searle	Hy Hazell, Michael Medwin, Andrew Keir	
1951	Talk of a Million	John C. Moody	John Paddy Carstairs	Jack Warner, Barbara Mullen	
1951	The Galloping Major	Bottomley, the bookmaker	Henry Cornelius	Basil Radford, Jimmy Hanley, Janette Scott	
1951	The Lavender Hill Mob	Lackery Wood	Charles Crichton	Alec Guinness, Stanley Holloway, Alfie Bass, Audrey Hepburn	
1951	The Magic Box	Sergeant in Storeroom	John Boulting	Robert Donat, Margaret Johnston, Maria Schell	Credited as "Sydney James"
1951	Lady Godiva Rides Again	Lew Beeson	Frank Launder	Pauline Stroud, Dennis Price, Diana Dors, Stanley Holloway	Released in the US as Bikini Baby
1952	I Believe in You	Sergeant Body	Basil Dearden; Michael Relph	Celia Johnson, Cecil Parker, Godfrey Tearle, Joan Collins	
1952	The Tall Headlines	Mr. Spencer	Terence Young	Mai Zetterling, Michael Denison, André Morell, Flora Robson	Released in the US as The Frightened Bride
1952	Emergency Call	Danny Marks	Lewis Gilbert	Jack Warner, Anthony Steel, Joy Shelton	Released in the US as The Hundred Hour
1952	Gift Horse	Ned Hardy	Compton Bennett	Trevor Howard, Richard Attenborough, Dora Bryan	Released in the US as Glory at Sea
1952	Time Gentlemen, Please!	Eric Hace	Lewis Gilbert	Eddie Byrne, Jane Barrett	
1952	Father's Doing Fine	Taxi Driver	Henry Cass	Richard Attenborough, Heather Thatcher, Noel Purcell	
1952	Venetian Bird	Bernardo	Ralph Thomas	Richard Todd, Eva Bartok	Released in the US as The Assassin
1952	Miss Robin Hood	Sidney	John Guillermin	Margaret Rutherford, Richard Hearne, James Robertson Justice	
1953	The Yellow Balloon	Barrow Boy	J. Lee Thompson	Andrew Ray, Kenneth More, Kathleen Ryan	Credited as "Sydney James"
1953	Cosh Boy	Police Sergeant	Lewis Gilbert	James Kenney, Joan Collins	Released in the US as The Slasher
1953	The Titfield Thunderbolt	Hawkins	Charles Crichton	Stanley Holloway, Naunton Wayne, George Relph, John Gregson	
1953	The Flanagan Boy	Sharkey	Reginald LeBorg	Barbara Payton, Frederick Valk, Tony Wright	Released in the US as Bad Blonde
1953	The Square Ring	Adams	Basil Dearden	Jack Warner, Robert Beatty, Maxwell Reed	
1953	Will Any Gentleman...?	Mr. Hobson	Michael Anderson	George Cole, Veronica Hurst, Heather Thatcher, Jon Pertwee, William Hartnell	
1953	Park Plaza 605	Superintendent Williams	Bernard Knowles	Tom Conway, Eva Bartok, Joy Shelton	Released in the US as Norman Conquest
1953	Is Your Honeymoon Really Necessary?	Hank Hanlon	Maurice Elvey	Bonar Colleano, Diana Dors, David Tomlinson	
1953	Escape by Night	Gino Rossi	John Gilling	Bonar Colleano, Andrew Ray, Simone Silva	Credited as "Sydney James"
1953	The Wedding of Lilli Marlene	Fennimore Hunt	Arthur Crabtree	Lisa Daniely, Hugh McDermott	
1954	The Weak and the Wicked	Syd Baden	J. Lee Thompson	Glynis Johns, Diana Dors, John Gregson	Released in the US as Young and Willing
1954	The House Across the Lake	Mr. Beverly Forrest	Ken Hughes	Alex Nicol, Hilary Brooke, Susan Stephen	Released in the US as Heat Wave
1954	The Rainbow Jacket	Harry	Basil Dearden	Robert Morley, Kay Walsh, Edward Underdown	
1954	Father Brown	Parkinson	Robert Hamer	Alec Guinness, Joan Greenwood, Peter Finch, Cecil Parker	
1954	Seagulls Over Sorrento	Able Seaman Charlie "Badge" Badger	John Boulting; Roy Boulting	Gene Kelly, John Justin, Bernard Lee	
1954	For Better, For Worse	The Foreman	J. Lee Thompson	Dirk Bogarde, Susan Stephen, Cecil Parker	
1954	The Belles of St. Trinian's	Benny	Frank Launder	Alastair Sim, Joyce Grenfell, George Cole	
1954	The Crowded Day	Nightwatchman	John Guillerman	John Gregson, Joan Rice	Released in the US as Shop Soiled
1954	Orders are Orders	Ed Waggermeyer	David Paltenghi	Peter Sellers, Brian Reece, Margot Grahame, Tony Hancock	Released in the US as Cocktails in the Kitchen
1954	Aunt Clara	Honest Sid	Anthony Kimmins	Ronald Shiner, Margaret Rutherford, A.E. Matthews, Fay Compton	
1955	Out of the Clouds	The Gambler	Basil Dearden	Anthony Steel, Robert Beatty, James Robertson Justice	
1955	The Glass Cage	Tony Lewis	Montgomery Tully	John Ireland, Honor Blackman	Released in the US as The Glass Tomb
1955	A Kid for Two Farthings	Ice Berg	Carol Reed	Celia Johnson, Diana Dors, David Kossoff	
1955	John and Julie	Arthur Pritchett	William Fairchild	Noelle Middleton, Moira Lister, Wilfrid Hyde-White	
1955	The Deep Blue Sea	Man outside bar	Anatole Litvak	Vivien Leigh, Kenneth More, Eric Portman	
1955	Joe MacBeth	Banky	Ken Hughes	Paul Douglas, Ruth Roman, Bonar Colleano	
1955	A Yank in Ermine	Nightclub manager	Gordon Parry	Noelle Middleton, Harold Lloyd Jr., Diana Decker	Credited as "Sydney James"
1955	It's a Great Day	Harry Mason	John Warrington	Ruth Dunning, Edward Evans	
1956	Wicked as They Come	Frank Allenborg	Ken Hughes	Arlene Dahl, Philip Carey, Herbert Marshall	Released in the US as Portrait in Smoke
1956	Trapeze	Harry the snake charmer	Carol Reed	Burt Lancaster, Tony Curtis, Gina Lollobrigida	
1956	Ramsbottom Rides Again	Black Jake	John Baxter	Arthur Askey, Shani Wallis, Betty Marsden	
1956	The Extra Day	Barney West	William Fairchild	Richard Basehart, Simone Simon, George Baker	
1956	The Iron Petticoat	Paul	Ralph Thomas	Bob Hope, Katharine Hepburn, James Robertson Justice	
1956	Dry Rot	Flash Harry	Maurice Elvey	Ronald Shiner, Brian Rix, Peggy Mount	
1957	Interpol	Joe, first bartender	John Gilling	Victor Mature, Anita Ekberg, Trevor Howard, Bonar Colleano	
1957	The Smallest Show on Earth	Mr. Hogg	Basil Dearden	Bill Travers, Virginia McKenna, Peter Sellers, Margaret Rutherford	Released in the US as Big Time Operators
1957	Quatermass 2	Jimmy Hall	Val Guest	Brian Donlevy, John Longden, Vera Day	Released in the US as Enemy From Space
1957	The Shiralee	Luck	Leslie Norman	Peter Finch, Elizabeth Sellars, Dana Wilson	
1957	Hell Drivers	Dusty	Cy Endfield	Stanley Baker, Herbert Lom, Peggy Cummins	
1957	The Story of Esther Costello	Ryan	David Miller	Joan Crawford, Rossano Brazzi, Heather Sears	
1957	Campbell's Kingdom	Tim	Ralph Thomas	Dirk Bogarde, Stanley Baker	
1957	A King in New York	Johnson - TV Advertiser	Charlie Chaplin	Charlie Chaplin, Dawn Addams, Maxine Audley, Jerry Desmonde	
1958	The Silent Enemy	Chief Petty Officer Thorpe	William Fairchild	Laurence Harvey, Dawn Addams, Michael Craig	
1958	Another Time, Another Place	Jake Klein	Lewis Allen	Lana Turner, Barry Sullivan, Glynis Johns, Sean Connery, Terence Longdon	
1958	Next to No Time	Albert, cabin steward	Henry Cornelius	Kenneth More, Betsy Drake, John Laurie	
1958	The Man Inside	Franklin	John Gilling	Jack Palance, Anita Ekberg, Nigel Patrick, Anthony Newley, Bonar Colleano	
1958	I Was Monty's Double	Y.M.C.A. Porter	John Guillermin	M. E. Clifton James, John Mills, Cecil Parker	
1958	The Sheriff of Fractured Jaw	The Drunk	Raoul Walsh	Kenneth More, Jayne Mansfield	
1959	Too Many Crooks	Sid	Mario Zampi	Terry-Thomas, George Cole, Brenda De Banzie, Bernard Bresslaw	
1959	Make Mine a Million	Sid Gibson	Lance Comfort	Arthur Askey, Bernard Cribbins	
1959	The 39 Steps	Perce	Ralph Thomas	Kenneth More, Taina Elg, Brenda de Banzie	
1959	Idol on Parade	Herbie	John Gilling	William Bendix, Anthony Newley, Lionel Jeffries	
1959	Upstairs and Downstairs	P.C. Edwards	Ralph Thomas	Michael Craig, Anne Heywood, Mylène Demongeot, Claudia Cardinale, James Robertson Justice	
1959	Tommy the Toreador	Cadena	John Paddy Carstairs	Tommy Steele, Janet Munro, Bernard Cribbins	
1959	Desert Mice	Bert	Michael Relph	Alfred Marks, Dora Bryan, Irene Handl, John Le Mesurier	
1960	Carry On Constable	Sgt. Frank Wilkins	Gerald Thomas	Eric Barker, Kenneth Williams, Charles Hawtrey, Kenneth Connor	
1960	And the Same to You	Sammy Gatt	George Pollock	Brian Rix, William Hartnell, Tommy Cooper	
1960	Watch Your Stern	Chief Petty Officer Mundy	Gerald Thomas	Kenneth Connor, Eric Barker, Leslie Phillips, Joan Sims	
1960	The Pure Hell of St Trinian's	Alphonse O'Reilly	Frank Launder	Cecil Parker, George Cole, Joyce Grenfell, Eric Barker	
1961	Carry On Regardless	Bert Handy	Gerald Thomas	Kenneth Connor, Charles Hawtrey, Joan Sims, Kenneth Williams	
1961	A Weekend with Lulu	Café Patron	John Paddy Carstairs	Bob Monkhouse, Leslie Phillips, Alfred Marks, Shirley Eaton	
1961	The Green Helmet	Richie Laudner	Michael Forlong	Bill Travers, Ed Begley, Nancy Walters	
1961	Double Bunk	Sid	C.M. Pennington-Richards	Ian Carmichael, Janette Scott	
1961	What a Carve Up!	Syd Butler	Pat Jackson	Kenneth Connor, Shirley Eaton, Dennis Price, Donald Pleasence	Released in the US as No Place Like Homicide
1961	Raising the Wind	Sid	Gerald Thomas	James Robertson Justice, Leslie Phillips, Kenneth Williams, Liz Fraser	Released in the US as Roommates
1961	What a Whopper	Harry Sutton	Gilbert Gunn	Adam Faith, Carole Lesley	
1962	Carry On Cruising	Captain Wellington Crowther	Gerald Thomas	Kenneth Williams, Kenneth Connor, Liz Fraser, Dilys Laye, Lance Percival	
1962	We Joined the Navy	Dance instructor	Wendy Toye	Kenneth More, Lloyd Nolan, Joan O'Brien, Derek Fowlds	Uncredited role
1963	Carry On Cabby	Charlie Hawkins	Gerald Thomas	Hattie Jacques, Kenneth Connor, Charles Hawtrey	
1964	The Beauty Jungle	Butlins Judge	Val Guest	Ian Hendry, Janette Scott, Ronald Fraser	Credited as "Sydney James"
1964	Carry On Cleo	Mark Antony	Gerald Thomas	Kenneth Williams, Kenneth Connor, Jim Dale, Charles Hawtrey, Joan Sims	
1965	Tokoloshe	Harry Parsons	Peter Prowse	Gert van den Bergh	Credited as "Sid James"
1965	Three Hats for Lisa	Sid Marks	Sidney Hayers	Joe Brown, Sophie Hardy, Una Stubbs	
1965	The Big Job	George Brain	Gerald Thomas	Dick Emery, Joan Sims, Sylvia Syms, Jim Dale	
1965	Carry On Cowboy	Johnny Finger, "The Rumpo Kid"	Gerald Thomas	Kenneth Williams, Jim Dale, Charles Hawtrey, Joan Sims	
1966	Where the Bullets Fly	Mortuary Attendant	John Gilling	Tom Adams, John Arnatt, Dawn Addams	
1967	Don't Lose Your Head	Sir Rodney Ffing / "The Black Fingernail"	Gerald Thomas	Kenneth Williams, Jim Dale, Joan Sims, Peter Butterworth	
1967	Carry On Doctor	Charlie Roper	Gerald Thomas	Frankie Howerd, Kenneth Williams, Jim Dale, Hattie Jacques	
1968	Carry On Up the Khyber	Sir Sidney Ruff-Diamond	Gerald Thomas	Kenneth Williams, Charles Hawtrey, Joan Sims, Angela Douglas	
1969	Carry On Camping	Sid Boggle	Gerald Thomas	Kenneth Williams, Charles Hawtrey, Joan Sims, Barbara Windsor	
1969	Carry On Again Doctor	Gladstone Screwer	Gerald Thomas	Kenneth Williams, Jim Dale, Charles Hawtrey, Hattie Jacques	
1970	Carry On Up the Jungle	Bill Boosey	Gerald Thomas	Frankie Howerd, Joan Sims, Charles Hawtrey, Terry Scott	
1970	Stop Exchange	The Tramp	Howard Rennie	Ian Yule, Charles Hawtrey	
1970	Carry On Loving	Sidney Bliss	Gerald Thomas	Kenneth Williams, Charles Hawtrey, Joan Sims, Hattie Jacques, Terry Scott	
1971	Carry On Henry	Henry VIII	Gerald Thomas	Kenneth Williams, Charles Hawtrey, Joan Sims, Barbara Windsor, Terry Scott	
1971	Carry On at Your Convenience	Sid Plummer	Gerald Thomas	Kenneth Williams, Joan Sims, Hattie Jacques, Charles Hawtrey, Bernard Bresslaw	
1972	Carry On Matron	Sid Carter	Gerald Thomas	Kenneth Williams, Charles Hawtrey, Hattie Jacques, Barbara Windsor, Terry Scott	
1972	Bless This House	Sid Abbott	Gerald Thomas	Diana Coupland, Terry Scott, June Whitfield, Peter Butterworth	
1972	Carry On Abroad	Vic Flange	Gerald Thomas	Kenneth Williams, Charles Hawtrey, Joan Sims, Barbara Windsor, Kenneth Connor	
1973	Carry On Girls	Councillor Sidney Fiddler	Gerald Thomas	Joan Sims, Bernard Bresslaw, Barbara Windsor, Jack Douglas, Peter Butterworth	
1974	Carry On Dick	Reverend Flasher / Dick Turpin	Gerald Thomas	Kenneth Williams, Kenneth Connor, Joan Sims, Barbara Windsor, Bernard Bresslaw	Final film role

== Television ==
Year	Title	Role	Notes
1948	Kid Flanagan	Sharkey Morrison	
1948	The Front Page	Hildy Johnson	
1950	Family Affairs	Mr. Hamburger	Episode: "The Laughing Cavalier"
1953	BBC Sunday-Night Theatre		Episode: "Our Marie"
1953	The Passing Show	Bit part	2 episodes
1956–1960	Hancock's Half Hour	Sidney Balmoral James	Regular role; 55 episodes
1956–1957	The Crime of the Century	Abbie	5 episodes; credited as "Sid James"
1956	The Adventures of Robin Hood	Master Henry	Episode: "Outlaw Money"
1956	The Buccaneers	Chantey Jack	Episode: "The Hand of the Hawk"
1957	ITV Play of the Week		Episode: "Another Part of the Forest"
1957	Shadow Squad	Spinner Burke	2 episodes
1957	The New Adventures of Martin Kane	Ben	Episode: "The Taxi Story"; credited as "Sid James"
1957	Pantomania: Babes in the Wood	The Genie / Friar Tuck	
1958	East End, West End	Sid	Regular role; 6 episodes
1958	Educated Evans	Sam Spiegel	Episode: "Stand Up and Fight"
1958	ITV Play of the Week	Wally Burton	Episode: "The Chigwell Chickens"
1958	The Adventures of William Tell	Schaffner	Episode: "Secret Death"
1960–1962	Citizen James	Sidney Balmoral James	Regular role; 32 episodes
1960	Christmas Night with the Stars	Sidney Balmoral James	
1963–1964	Taxi!	Sid Stone	Regular role; 26 episodes
1966	Armchair Theatre	Basher Bates	Episode: "Don't Utter a Note"; credited as "Sid James"
1966–1968	George and the Dragon	George Russell	Regular role (credited as "Sid James"); 26 episodes
1967	The Dick Emery Show		
1968	Mike and Bernie's Show		
1969–1970	Two in Clover	Sid Turner	Regular role; 13 episodes
1969	The Bruce Forsyth Show		2 episodes; credited as "Sid James"
1969	Carry On Christmas	Ebeneezer Scrooge	
1969	All Star Comedy Carnival	Sid Turner	
1970	Carry On Again Christmas	Long John Sil	
1971–1976	Bless This House	Sid Abbott	Regular role; 65 episodes
1971	All This, and Christmas Too!	Sid Jones	
1973	Carry On Christmas	Various	
1975	Carry On Laughing	Various roles	4 episodes
