= Colleano =

Colleano is a surname. Notable people with the surname include:

- Bonar Colleano (1924–1958), American-British actor
- Con Colleano (1899–1973), Australian tightrope walker

== See also ==
- Colliano
- Collegno
- Collesano
