= Flame and the Flesh =

1954 film

- Theatrical release poster
- Directed by: Richard Brooks
- Written by: Helen Deutsch
- Based on: Naples au baiser de feu by Auguste Bailly
- Produced by: Joe Pasternak
- Starring: Lana Turner; Pier Angeli; Carlos Thompson; Bonar Colleano
- Cinematography: Christopher Challis
- Edited by: Albert Akst; Raymond Poulton
- Music by: Nicholas Brodszky
- Production company: Metro-Goldwyn-Mayer
- Distributed by: Metro-Goldwyn-Mayer
- Release date: May 1, 1954
- Running time: 104 minutes
- Country: United States
- Language: English
- Budget: $1,275,000
- Box office: $2,294,000

Flame and the Flesh is a 1954 American drama film directed by Richard Brooks and starring Lana Turner, Pier Angeli, Carlos Thompson and Bonar Colleano. It was made and distributed by MGM and produced by Joe Pasternak from a screenplay by Helen Deutsch based on the 1924 novel French Naples au baiser de feu by Auguste Bailly. The music score was by Nicholas Brodszky and the cinematography by Christopher Challis. It was shot at M-G-M British Studios near London and on location around Positano and Naples in Southern Italy. The film's sets were designed by the art director Alfred Junge.

== Plot ==
Madeline Duvain is evicted from her apartment for non-payment of rent. She wanders the street, where musician Ciccio Duvario takes pity on her and invites her home. The manipulative Madeline soon begins to take advantage of his kindness.

Ciccio works at a nightclub where his roommate Nino is a very popular singer. Lisa, the club owner's daughter, is in love with Nino, who has been seeing Francesca, a married woman. Nino realizes that Lisa would be good for him, so they set a wedding date. But when he meets Madeline, the attraction is immediate. They run off together. Ciccio vows to find and kill them.

Madeline grows frustrated when Nino has difficulty finding work. She seduces a club owner into hiring Nino to sing. Nino finally understands the kind of woman she is, striking the club owner and slapping her. Madeline knows too late that she loves him as Nino leaves her forever, hoping that Ciccio will forgive him and Lisa will take him back.

== Cast ==
- Lana Turner as Madeline Duvain
- Pier Angeli as Lisa
- Carlos Thompson as Nino
- Bonar Colleano as Ciccio Duvario
- Charles Goldner as Mondari
- Peter Illing as Peppe
- Rosalie Crutchley as Francesca
- Marne Maitland as Filiberto
- Eric Pohlmann as Marina Proprietor
- Catharina Ferraz as Dressmaker
- Alex Gallier as Playboy

== Background and production ==
The film is a remake of a 1938 French film, Naples au baiser de feu, also known in the USA as The Kiss of Fire, itself a remake of a 1925 French silent film of the same name. Both earlier versions were based on the same novel Naples au baiser de feu by Auguste Bailly.

The film was shot in London and Naples, Italy. In this film, Lana Turner, famously blonde, appears as a brunette.

== Reception ==
According to MGM records, the film earned $1,329,000 in the US and Canada and $965,000 elsewhere, resulting in a loss of $171,000.
