= Love and Desire =

1951 film

- Directed by: Henri Decoin; Luis María Delgado
- Written by: Henri Decoin; José Santugini
- Based on: Le désir et l'amour by Auguste Bailly
- Produced by: Charles Delac; Vicente Sempere; Edmond Ténoudji
- Starring: Martine Carol; António Vilar; Carmen Sevilla
- Cinematography: Michel Kelber
- Edited by: Annick Millet; Félix Suárez Inclán
- Music by: Jesús García Leoz; René Sylviano
- Production companies: Lais S.A.; Société Générale de Cinématographie
- Distributed by: Les Films Marceau
- Release date: 9 October 1951
- Running time: 80 minutes
- Countries: France; Spain
- Language: French

Love and Desire (French: Le désir et l'amour) is a 1951 French-Spanish drama film directed by Henri Decoin and Luis María Delgado and starring Martine Carol, António Vilar and Carmen Sevilla. It was based on the 1929 novel of the same title by Auguste Bailly.

It was shot at the Epinay Studios in Paris and on location in Madrid, Torremolinos and Málaga. The film's sets were designed by the art directors Julio Molina and René Renoux.

== Synopsis ==
A French film crew are working on location in southern Spain. When the leading man refuses to swim across a river, his place is taken by a local man who is soon hired as a stuntman for the whole film. Much to the anger of his Spanish fiancée, he falls in love with the film's female star.

== Cast ==
- Martine Carol as Martine - la star
- António Vilar as Antonio - le pêcheur
- Carmen Sevilla as Lola - sa fiancée
- Albert Préjean as Titi - le régisseur général français
- Françoise Arnoul as Françoise - la script-girl
- Gérard Landry as Gérard - le jeune premier
- Parisys as Adèle - l'habilleuse
- Rafael Cortés as Le 2nd pêcheur
- Joaquín Roa as Miguel - le régisseur espagnol
- Ena Sedeño as L'amie de Lola
- José María Rodríguez as Le 1er pêcheur
- Tony Hernández as Manolo
- Matilde López Roldán as L'autre amie de Lola

== Bibliography ==
- Bentley, Bernard. A Companion to Spanish Cinema. Boydell & Brewer 2008.
- Goble, Alan. The Complete Index to Literary Sources in Film. Walter de Gruyter, 1999.
