= Harry Brown (writer) =

American poet, novelist and screenwriter

Harry Peter McNab Brown Jr. (April 30, 1917 – November 2, 1986) was an American poet, novelist, and Academy Award-winning screenwriter.

== Life and career ==
Brown was born in Portland, Maine. He attended Harvard University where he befriended American poet Robert Lowell. After his sophomore year, Brown dropped out of Harvard to write poetry and work at Time magazine. He also contributed to The New Yorker.

In 1940, New Directions issued Brown's first poetry collection, The End of a Decade. The following year, Charles Scribner's Sons published his documentary-style epic, The Poem of Bunker Hill. The 158-page stanzaic verse about the Battle of Bunker Hill in the American Revolutionary War won praise for its poetic skill and its timely presentation of a vital topic: young men at war. Louise Bogan from The New Yorker wrote that Brown exhibited "from the first, all the signs of virtuosity."

In July 1941, Brown enlisted in the U.S. Army Corps of Engineers where he served at Fort Belvoir, Virginia. In 1942 he joined the staff of Yank magazine. He wrote a humorous column for the weekly magazine about a goldbricking private named Artie Greengroin. In 1945, Knopf collected these columns into a book entitled Artie Greengroin PFC.

Brown soon branched out into playwriting with A Sound of Hunting, which opened at the Lyceum Theatre on Broadway in November 1945 and starred Burt Lancaster and Frank Lovejoy. The play was later produced by Stanley Kramer and directed by Edward Dmytryk under the title Eight Iron Men (1952) with a cast of Bonar Colleano, Lee Marvin, and Arthur Franz.

In 1944, Brown completed a WWII novel, A Walk in the Sun, about an infantry outfit fighting in Italy. His successful novel was quickly made into a film of the same name. The film's director Lewis Milestone encouraged Brown to come to Hollywood and work as a screenwriter. He did so and contributed to numerous films including Wake of the Red Witch (1948) and Sands of Iwo Jima (1949) both starring John Wayne; Kiss Tomorrow Goodbye (1950) starring James Cagney; A Place in the Sun (1951) (won a Best Adapted Screenplay Oscar) with Elizabeth Taylor and Montgomery Clift; Eight Iron Men (1952); and Ocean's 11 (1960) starring the Rat Pack (Frank Sinatra, Dean Martin, Sammy Davis Jr., Peter Lawford and Joey Bishop). When Ocean's 11 was remade in 2001, Brown was credited for his work on the original. The film El Dorado (1966), with John Wayne, Robert Mitchum and James Caan, was loosely based on Brown's novel The Stars in Their Courses (1960) about a murderous feud in southern Colorado in the 1870s.

In the early 1960s, Brown and his wife moved to Guanajuato, Mexico, where they lived for 15 years.

Brown died from emphysema in Los Angeles in 1986.

== Awards ==
- 1936 The Young Poets Prize , awarded by Poetry magazine
- 1937 Lloyd McKim Garrison Award
- 1938–1939 Shelley Memorial Award
- 1952 Academy Award for Best Adapted Screenplay for A Place in the Sun (award shared with Michael Wilson)

== Works ==
=== Poetry ===
- The End of a Decade. New Directions. 1940.
- The Poem of Bunker Hill. C. Scribner's sons. 1941.
- The Violent: New Poems. New Directions. 1943.
- The Beast in His Hunger. A.A. Knopf. 1949.

=== Novels ===
- A Walk in The Sun. University of Nebraska Press. 1998. ISBN 978-0-8032-6148-8.
- The Wild Hunt. Harcourt Brace Jovanovich. 1973. ISBN 978-0-15-196720-9.
- A Quiet Place To Work. Knopf. 1968.
- The Stars in Their Courses: A Novel. Knopf. 1960.
- Artie Greengroin, Pfc. Knopf. 1945.
- Ralph Stein; Harry Brown (1943). It's A Cinch, Private Finch!. Whittlesey house, McGraw-Hill book company, inc.

=== Plays ===
- A Sound Of Hunting: A Play In Three Acts. A.A. Knopf. 1946.

=== Screenplays (partial list) ===
- The True Glory (1945), co-written with Paddy Chayefsky and Frank Harvey
- A Walk in the Sun (1945), based on his novel A Walk in the Sun
- Arch of Triumph (1948), co-written with Lewis Milestone
- Wake of the Red Witch (1948), co-written with Kenneth Gamet
- Sands of Iwo Jima (1950) co-written with James Edward Grant, original story by Brown
- Kiss Tomorrow Goodbye (1950)
- The Man on the Eiffel Tower (1950)
- A Place in the Sun (1951), co-written with Michael Wilson
- Only the Valiant (1951), co-written with Edmund H. North
- Eight Iron Men (1952), based on his play A Sound of Hunting
- Many Rivers to Cross (1955), co-written with Guy Trosper
- The Virgin Queen (1955), co-written with Mindret Lord
- D-Day the Sixth of June (1956), co-written with Ivan Moffat
- Ocean's 11 (1960), co-written with Charles Lederer
- El Dorado (1966), Brown's screen credit consists of being mentioned as the author of The Stars in Their Courses
