= Jack Stehlin =

American television and theater actor (born 1966)

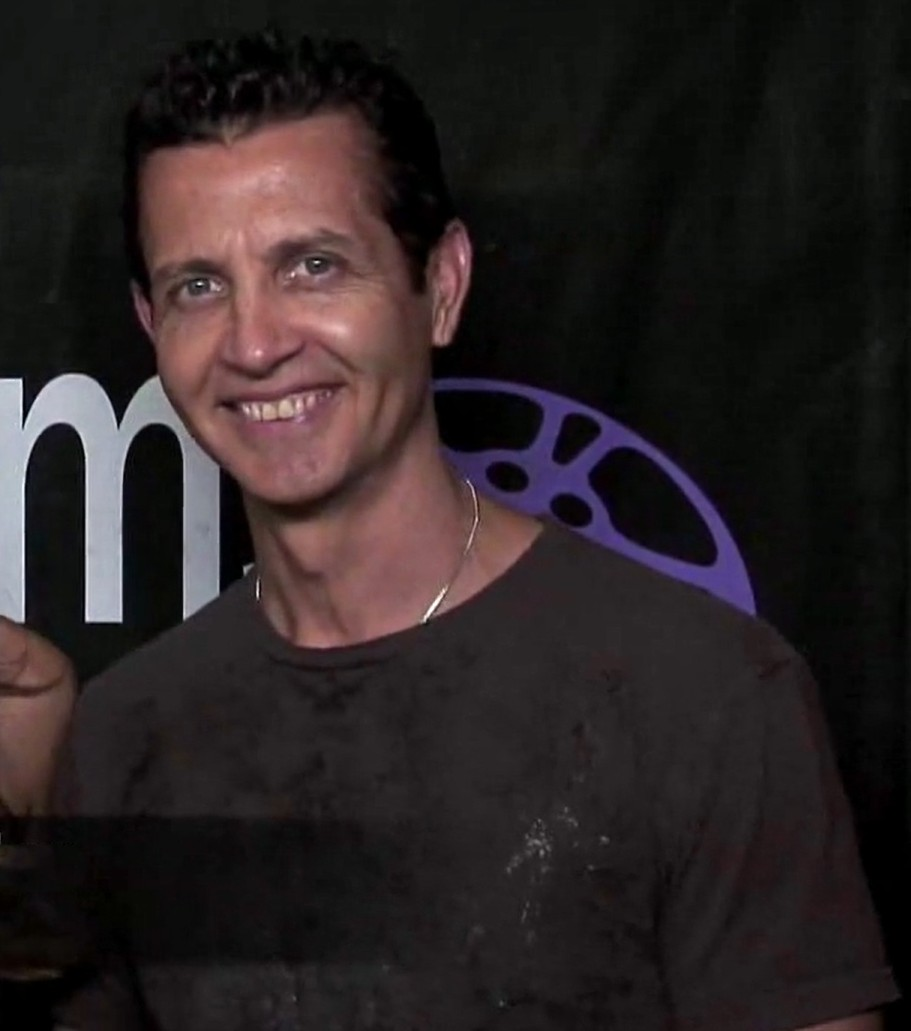
- Stehlin in 2009
- Born: John Anthony Stehlin III; July 21, 1966 (age 60); Allentown, Pennsylvania, U.S.
- Education: University of South Carolina; Juilliard School (BFA)
- Occupation: Actor
- Years active: 1983–present

John Anthony Stehlin III (born July 21, 1966) is an American film, television, and theater actor. He is best known for his role as DEA Captain Roy Till on the Showtime series Weeds, for which he and the cast were nominated for a Screen Actors Guild Award for Outstanding Performance by an Ensemble in a Comedy Series.

== Early life and education ==
John Anthony Stehlin III was born July 21, 1966, in Allentown, Pennsylvania, to John Stehlin, a Minor League Baseball player, and Kitty (née O’Donnell), a circus juggler and acrobat.

Stehlin grew up in Allentown, PA. His family eventually moved to the Washington, DC area, where he excelled in high school baseball as a catcher.

Stehlin attended the University of South Carolina, initially intending to play college baseball, but he became interested in acting after taking an acting class, and seeing a touring performance of The Acting Company. He subsequently left the university and moved to New York City, where he attended Juilliard School's drama division as a member of Group 11 (1978–1982).. His classmates in Group 11 included Megan Gallagher, Jack Kenny, Penny Johnson Jerald, and Lorraine Toussaint.

During his time at The Juilliard School he produced and starred in True Westthe first Sam Shepard play ever presented at the school. His work at Juilliard established the foundation for a career rooted in classical training, Stanislavsky technique, and ensemble collaboration.

After graduating from Juilliard, Stehlin toured with John Houseman's The Acting Company.

== Career ==
Jack began his career at the Juilliard School, where he produced and starred in True West, the first Sam Shepard play ever staged at the conservatory. After graduating, he performed widely in New York, appearing on Broadway in Brighton Beach Memoirs and working extensively with the New York Shakespeare Festival, the Classic Stage Company, Primary Stages, and other major institutions. He later founded Circus Theatricals, which presented classical and contemporary work in New York before expanding to Los Angeles and evolving into The New American Theatre.

In television, Stehlin is best known for his recurring role as DEA Captain Roy Till on the Showtime series Weeds, a performance that earned him and the cast a Screen Actors Guild Award nomination for Outstanding Performance by an Ensemble in a Comedy Series. His other television work includes recurring roles on Buffy the Vampire Slayer, JAG, The Event, and Hieroglyph, along with guest appearances on American Crime Story: The Assassination of Gianni Versace, Monk, NCIS, ER, and numerous other series.

Stehlin has appeared in feature films including Salome, Wilde Salome, The Chicago 8, Boston Strangler: The Untold Story, and Purpo$e. In Los Angeles he continues to act and direct as artistic director of The New American Theatre, and he has also directed the short films The Jack Twidwell Story and Game 7.

== New York stage ==
Stehlin's New York theatre work includes extensive roles with the New York Shakespeare Festival, where he appeared as Mowbray in Richard II directed by Steven Berkoff, the Dauphin in Henry V opposite Kevin Kline and Mary Elizabeth Mastrantonio directed by Wilford Leach. Jack was featured in an Al Hirchfield drawing for his role. Count de Bernis in Casanova directed by Michael Greif, Sir Richard Vernon in Henry IV, Part I directed by Des McAnuff, Flavius in Julius Caesar directed by Stuart Vaughn, Alcibiades in Timon of Athens directed by Brian Kulick, Poor Man in Don Juan directed by Richard Foreman, and Samson in Romeo and Juliet directed by Stuart Vaughn. At the Classic Stage Company he performed in Macbeth directed by Jack Stehlin, Phaedra Brittanica directed by Carey Perloff, Don Juan directed by Carey Perloff, and The Learned Ladies directed by Richard Seyd. At Primary Stages he originated the role of Bobby in Matthew Witten's Washington Square Moves directed by Seth Gordon, and at the Manhattan Punch Line he created the role of Jack in Howard Korder’s Life on Earth directed by Robin Saex. Life on Earth later became the full-length play Boys Life.

== Regional and international theatre ==
Stehlin's regional and international credits include work with the American Repertory Theatre, where he played Apollo in Alcestis directed by Robert Wilson, Truffaldino in The King Stag directed by Andre Serban, Roger in The Balcony directed by JoAnne Akalaitis, and The Son in Six Characters in Search of an Author directed by Robert Brustein. He originated the role of Bobby Nobis in Gillette directed by David Wheeler. At Hartford Stage he played Sam Draycott in Hidden Laughter directed by Mark Lamos. His regional work also includes Theseus and Oberon in A Midsummer Night's Dream directed by Mary B. Robinson for the Philadelphia Drama Guild; Claudio in Much Ado About Nothing directed by William Ludel and Cleon in Pericles also directed by Ludel at Milwaukee Repertory Theatre; Petruccio in The Taming of the Shrew and Orsino in Twelfth Night, both directed by Pamela Hawthorne for Missouri Repertory Theatre; Juan in Yerma directed by Libby Appel for Indiana Repertory Theatre; and performances at Stamford Center of the Arts including Salome directed by Al Pacino. He also appeared as Selridge in Biloxi Blues directed by Jack Going at Paper Mill Playhouse and performed in Danton's Death directed by Stan Wojewodski Jr. at Baltimore Center Stage.

== The Acting Company ==
With John Houseman’s The Acting Company, Stehlin appeared as Damis in Tartuffe directed by Brian Murray, Orsino in Twelfth Night directed by Michael Langham, Cleon in Pericles directed by Toby Robertson, and in a leading role in Danton's Death also directed by Brian Murray.

== Los Angeles theatre ==
After relocating to Los Angeles, Stehlin relaunched Circus Theatricals and later developed it into The New American Theatre. His Los Angeles performances include Lear in Lear Redux (a co-production of The New American Theatre, the Odyssey Theatre, and Not Man Apart), Macbeth in Macbeth Revisited directed by Jack Stehlin for The New American Theatre, and Prospero in Tempest Redux, a collaboration between the Odyssey Theatre, The New American Theatre, and Not Man Apart directed by John Farmanesh-Bocca. He played Kenny in 63 Trillion directed by Steve Zuckerman, Gustav in Creditors directed by David Trainer, Bottom in A Midsummer Night's Dream directed by Jack Stehlin, and Brutus in Julius Caesar also directed by Stehlin. His additional Los Angeles roles include Titus in Titus Redux directed by John Farmanesh-Bocca, Jerzy Leznewski in More Lies About Jerzy written by Davey Holmes, directed by David Trainer, and roles in Salome opposite Al Pacino and Jessica Chastain, at the Wadsworth Theatre directed by Estelle Parsons.

Stehlin played Major Jonathan Fredricks in Harm's Way directed by Steve Zuckerman, Macbeth in an Odyssey Theatre and Circus Theatricals co-production directed by Casey Biggs, Tartuffe in Tartuffe directed by Jack Stehlin, Richard III in Richard III directed by Casey Biggs, Lee in True West directed by Jack Stehlin, Hamlet in Hamlet directed by Casey Biggs, and Scapin in The Cheats of Scapin directed by Stehlin. He also played Jim in The Job directed by Shem Bitterman, Leonard in The Habitation of Dragons directed by Crystal Brian, Chicken in The Kingdom of Earth at the Hudson Avenue Theatre, Charlie Fox in the Los Angeles premiere of Speed the Plow directed by Elina de Santos, Alceste in The Misanthrope directed by Jack Stehlin, and the character known as Man in The Circle written and directed by Shem Bitterman.

== Directing ==
Jack has directed numerous productions for The New American Theatre, including Measure for Measure, Macbeth: Revisited, Uncle Vanya, Loose Ends, Boys’ Life, Julius Caesar, The Circle, Five Beauties by Tennessee Williams, and Meanwhile, Back at the Super Lair.... In collaboration with the Odyssey Theatre he directed Three Sisters in 2009 along with separate productions of Macbeth and The Taming of the Shrew that same year. He has also directed two short films, The Jack Twidwell Story and Game 7.

== Awards ==
For his work on Weeds, Stehlin shared a Screen Actor's Guild (SAG) nomination for Outstanding Performance by an Ensemble in a Comedy Series. In 2019 he was a recipient of a career achievement award from the arts advocacy organization Stage Raw.

He has also received recognition for his stage work in Los Angeles, including Back Stage West Garland Awards for leading performances in The Job and Richard III. His additional honors include multiple LA Weekly Theater Award nominations for his performances in The Job, Tartuffe, The Circle, More Lies About Jerzy, and Creditors, as well as a Los Angeles Drama Critics Circle nomination for his lead performance in Richard III and a directing nomination for Uncle Vanya.

He was also nominated for a Stage Raw Theatre Award for Leading Male Performance for Tempest Redux.

== Teaching ==
Stehlin teaches acting through The New American Theatre, where he leads the company's Stanislavsky Workshop, a professional advanced acting program grounded in the teachings of Constantin Stanislavsky. In the workshop, actors work on monologues and scenes with an emphasis on authenticity, freedom in performance, and close attention to the text. The program brings together working actors from theatre, television, and film and encourages shared dialogue among performers committed to long-term careers.

== Personal life ==
Stehlin is married to Jeannine Wisnosky, who is also his producing partner at The New American Theatre.

== Family Background ==
Stehlin's Australian prize fighter great-grandfather turned his ten children into a traveling circus act that joined P. T. Barnum and later the Ringling Brothers in the early 20th century. Stehlin's family includes two family members in the Circus Hall of Fame and the Guinness Book of World Records. He is a great-nephew of Australian Con Colleano, the first wire walker to do a forward somersault on the wire and great nephew of actor Bonar Colleano.

Stehlin's mother, Kitty, was part of the second generation of Colleanos to join "The Juggling Colleanos," where she performed a juggling and tumbling act with her two brothers and two sisters. Besides traveling the United States with the Ringling Brothers, the Juggling Colleanos were often seen on television shows, including The Ed Sullivan Show and Caesar's Hour.

== Film and TV ==
=== Television ===
- The Assassination of Gianni Versace: American Crime Story (2018)
- Hieroglyph (2014)
- NCIS: Los Angeles (2011, 1 episode)
- Love Bites (2011, 1 episode)
- The Event (2011, 1 episode)
- Dark Blue (2010, 1 episode)
- Weeds (2006-2009, 18 episodes)
- Monk (2008, 1 episode)
- NCIS (2005, 1 episode)
- Without a Trace (2005, 1 episode)
- The Practice (2004, 1 episode)
- JAG (2003, 3 episodes)
- Strong Medicine (2003, 1 episode)
- Crossing Jordan (2002, 1 episode)
- Buffy the Vampire Slayer (2000, 3 episodes)
- Get Real (2000, 1 episode)
- ER (1999, 1 episode)
- Judging Amy (1999, 1 episode)
- NYPD Blue (1998, 1 episode)
- Blackout Effect (1998, TV movie)
- The Practice (1997, 1 episode)
- General Hospital (1997)
- The Client (1995, 1 episode)
- L.A. Law (1987, 1 episode)

=== Film ===
- 3 Normandy Lane (2019)
- Salome (2014)
- Wilde Salome (2011)
- The Chicago 8 (2010)
- Boston Strangler: The Untold Story (2008)
