= Eric Pohlmann =

Austrian actor (1913–1979)

- Born: Erich Pollak; 18 July 1913; Vienna, Austria-Hungary
- Died: 25 July 1979 (aged 66); Bad Reichenhall, Upper Bavaria, West Germany
- Education: Max Reinhardt Seminar
- Years active: 1948–1979
- Spouse(s): Liselotte Goettinger (1939–1968; her death; 2 children); Lili Stern-Pohlmann

Eric Pohlmann (born Erich Pollak; 18 July 1913 – 25 July 1979) was an Austrian actor, long based in the United Kingdom. He appeared in over 200 film and television productions, mostly in character roles.

His large frame and massive features typecast him in roles as master criminals and spies, or conversely as police officers or detectives, as well as other figures of authority. He voiced Ernst Stavro Blofeld, the primary antagonist of the James Bond series, in the Bond films From Russia with Love (1963) and Thunderball (1965).

== Early life and education ==
Pohlmann was born Erich Pollak to Jewish parents in Vienna in 1913. He received his acting training at the Max Reinhardt Seminar, and began his professional career at the Raimund Theater, while supplementing his income by working as an entertainer in a bar.

In 1939, he followed fiancée and later wife, actress Lieselotte Goettinger, into exile in London. Until mid-1941, both were kept in an internment camp. After their release, Eric took part in propaganda broadcasts against the Nazis on the BBC World Service. In order to earn a living, the Pohlmanns temporarily took positions in the household of the Duke of Bedford, Lieselotte as a cook and Eric, as he then became known, as butler.

== Career ==
After the war, he began a career on the West End stage. He played J.J. Peachum in Sam Wanamaker's Royal Court production of The Threepenny Opera in 1956. From the end of the 1940s, Pohlmann was often present in film and television productions, taking supporting roles in various adventure and crime films, and appearing occasionally in comedies. His large frame and massive features typecast him in roles as master criminals and spies, or conversely as police officers or detectives, as well as other figures of authority. He was frequently cast in "foreign" roles, portraying Turks, Italians, Arabs, Greeks or Asians; he also played King George II in Disney's Rob Roy, the Highland Rogue and King George III twice.

One of his earliest film appearances was in Carol Reed's classic The Third Man (1949). He also played supporting roles in such British films as They Who Dare (1954), Chance of a Lifetime (1950), Reach for the Sky (1956), and Expresso Bongo (1960). He also appeared in US productions, notably Moulin Rouge (1952), Mogambo (1953), Lust For Life (1956) and 55 Days at Peking (1963). Twice he appeared in films directed by Richard Thorpe and starring Robert Taylor – The Adventures of Quentin Durward (1955) and The House of the Seven Hawks (1959).

He displayed his comedic talents in films like Gentlemen Marry Brunettes (1955) with Jane Russell, as a lecherous Arab sheikh in The Belles of St. Trinian's (1954), as "The Fat Man" in Carry On Spying (1964) and in The Return of the Pink Panther (1975).

Pohlmann (uncredited) also provided the voice of the unseen head of SPECTRE, Ernst Stavro Blofeld, in the James Bond films From Russia with Love (1963) and Thunderball (1965).

In the 1960s and 1970s, Pohlmann relaunched his German-speaking career in West German and Austrian film and television productions. He had guest roles in the popular crime series Der Kommissar and Derrick, and also appeared in television plays for ORF and Bayerischer Rundfunk, often under the direction of Franz Josef Wild. In addition to The Defence Counsel (1961) with Barbara Rütting and Carl Heinz Schroth, he appeared in Little Lord Fauntleroy (1962) with Albrecht Schoenhals and Michael Ande, as well as The Dreyfus Affair (1968) with Karl Michael Vogler and Bernhard Wicki. In 1962, Pohlmann also appeared in The Puzzle of the Red Orchid starring Marisa Mell, Christopher Lee and Klaus Kinski, a West German film adaptation of an Edgar Wallace novel.

His many roles in Austrian TV's acclaimed production of Friedrich Torberg's 'Tante Jolesch' established Pohlmann as a major star in his home country.

Pohlmann's greatest success in German TV drama came in 1970 with an adaptation of Wilkie Collins' novel The Woman in White, one of the most successful television productions of the year which gained over 9 million viewers. Under the direction of William Semmelroth, Pohlmann appeared in the role of the villainous Count Fosco, alongside Heidelinde Weis, Christoph Bantzer, Pinkas Braun and Helmut Käutner. The mini-series has a cult following to this day.

Pohlmann was a regular on British television, taking the role of "Inspector Goron" in the 1954-1955 TV series Colonel March of Scotland Yard with Boris Karloff, and appearing as a guest star in such series as The Saint, The Champions, The Avengers, Danger Man, Department S, Jason King and Paul Temple.

In 1978, he worked with the actor-director Maximilian Schell in an Austro/West German film production of Ödön von Horváth's play Geschichten aus dem Wienerwald (Tales from the Vienna Woods). The film was shown at the 1979 London Film Festival.

== Death ==
On 25 July 1979, during final rehearsals for his second appearance at the Salzburg Festival, Pohlmann suffered a heart attack, and died the same day in a hotel in Bad Reichenhall. He was 66.

He was survived by his children and his second wife, Lili Stern-Pohlman, a Polish-born Holocaust survivor.

== Cultural references ==
In 2006, the Turner Classic Movies "31 Days of Oscar" festival was based on the theme of "360 Degrees of Oscar" (based on the game of "Six Degrees of Kevin Bacon") in which TCM chooses an actor who has played a significant role in Oscar history, and builds its entire schedule around him. They chose Eric Pohlmann.

== Filmography ==
Year	Title	Role	Notes
1948	Portrait from Life	Search group leader	
1949	Marry Me!	Mr. Cinelli	Uncredited
1949	The Third Man	Waiter at Smolka's	Uncredited
1949	Children of Chance	Sergeant	
1950	Chance of a Lifetime	Xenobian	
1950	Cairo Road	Ship's Captain	
1950	State Secret	Cable Car conductor	
1950	Blackout	Otto Ford	
1950	The Clouded Yellow	Greek taxidermist	
1950	Highly Dangerous	Joe – the bartender	
1950	Traveller's Joy	Gustafsen	
1951	The Long Dark Hall	Mr. Polaris (the mystery witness)	
1951	Hell Is Sold Out	Louis, the proprietor	
1951	There Is Another Sun	Markie	
1952	His Excellency	Dobrieda	
1952	The Woman's Angle	Steffano	
1952	Emergency Call	Flash Harry	
1952	Penny Princess	Monsieur Paul	Uncredited
1952	Venetian Bird	Gostini	
1952	Monsoon	Molac	
1952	The Man Who Watched Trains Go By	Goin	
1952	Moulin Rouge	Picard	Uncredited
1952	The Gambler and the Lady	Arturo Colonna	
1953	The Beggar's Opera	Inn Keeper	
1953	Mogambo	Leon Boltchak	
1953	Blood Orange	Mr. Mercedes	
1953	Rob Roy, the Highland Rogue	King George I	
1953	36 Hours	Slossen, the smuggler	
1954	They Who Dare	Captain Papadapoulos	
1954	Knave of Hearts	Boarding House Proprietor	Uncredited
1954	Flame and the Flesh	Marina Proprietor	
1954	Forbidden Cargo	Steven Lasovich	
1954	The Belles of St. Trinian's	The Sultan of Makyad	
1955	The Glass Cage	Henri Sapolio	
1955	A Prize of Gold	Fischer	
1955	Break in the Circle	Emile	
1955	The Constant Husband	Papa Sopranelli	
1955	Gentlemen Marry Brunettes	M. Ballard	
1955	The Adventures of Quentin Durward	Gluckmeister	
1956	The Gelignite Gang	Mr. Popoulos ("Populace")	
1956	Reach for the Sky	Adjutant of Prison Camp	
1956	Lust for Life	Colbert	
1956	High Terrace	Otto Kellner	
1956	House of Secrets	Gratz	
1956	Zarak	Tobacco seller	Uncredited
1956	Anastasia	Von Drivnitz	Uncredited
1957	The Counterfeit Plan	Frank Wandelman	
1957	Interpol	Etienne Fayala	
1957	Let's Be Happy	Customs Official	
1957	Fire Down Below	Hotel Owner	
1957	Across the Bridge	Police Sergeant	
1957	Not Wanted on Voyage	Pedro	
1957	Barnacle Bill	Liberamanian Consul	
1958	A Tale of Two Cities	Sawyer	
1958	I Accuse!	Bertillon	
1958	The Duke Wore Jeans	Bastini – Prime Minister	
1958	Nor the Moon by Night	Anton Boryslawski	
1958	The Man Inside	Tristao	
1958	Further Up the Creek	President	
1958	Mark of the Phoenix	Duser	
1959	Three Crooked Men	Masters	
1959	John Paul Jones	King George III	
1959	Alive and Kicking	Captain	
1959	The House of the Seven Hawks	Captain Rohner	
1959	Upstairs and Downstairs	Mario	
1959	Expresso Bongo	Leon	
1960	Life Is a Circus	Rickenbeck	
1960	Sands of the Desert	Scrobin	
1960	Surprise Package	Chief of Police Stefan Miralis	
1960	Man Who Couldn't Walk	The Consul General	
1960	No Kidding	King	
1960	Passport to China	Ivono Kong	
1960	Snowball	Editor	
1961	The Singer Not the Song	Presidente	
1961	Carry On Regardless	Sinister Man	
1961	The Kitchen	Mr. Marango	
1962	The Puzzle of the Red Orchid	Kerkie Minelli	
1962	Village of Daughters	Marcio (A Father)	
1962	Mrs. Gibbons' Boys	Morelli	
1962	The Devil's Agent	Bloch	
1963	Cairo	Nicodemos	
1963	Follow the Boys	Italian Farmer	
1963	55 Days at Peking	Baron von Meck	
1963	From Russia with Love	Ernst Stavro Blofeld	Voice, Uncredited
1963	Dr. Syn, Alias the Scarecrow	King George III	
1963	The Sicilians	Inspector Bressin	
1964	Shadow of Fear	Henry Spiroulos	
1964	Hot Enough for June	Galushka	
1964	Carry On Spying	The Fat Man	
1964	Night Train to Paris	Krogh	
1965	Joey Boy	Antonio (Italian farmer)	
1965	Those Magnificent Men in Their Flying Machines	Italian Mayor	
1965	Thunderball	Ernst Stavro Blofeld	Voice, Uncredited
1966	Where the Spies Are	Farouk	
1967	Hot Pavements of Cologne	Benno Trooger	
1968	The Mini-Affair	World Banker	
1968	With Oak Leaves and Fig Leaf	Old General	
1968	Inspector Clouseau	Bergesch	
1970	Foreign Exchange	Borensko	ABC Movie of the Week
1971	The Woman in White	Count Fosco	TV miniseries
1971	The Horsemen	Merchant in Kandahar	
1973	Tiffany Jones	Jabal	
1975	The Return of the Pink Panther	Fat Man	
1976	The Mimosa Wants to Blossom Too	Iwan Pederenko	
1976	Tea for Three		
1979	Ashanti	Zeda El-Kabir	
1979	Tales from the Vienna Woods	Mister	
1980	Maria – Nur die Nacht war ihr Zeuge		
