= Pool of London (film) =

1951 British film by Basil Dearden

- Original British quad format film poster
- Directed by: Basil Dearden
- Screenplay by: Jack Whittingham; John Eldridge
- Produced by: Michael Balcon
- Starring: Bonar Colleano; Susan Shaw; Renée Asherson; Moira Lister; Earl Cameron
- Cinematography: Gordon Dines
- Edited by: Peter Tanner
- Music by: John Addison
- Production company: Ealing Studios
- Distributed by: General Film Distributors (UK)
- Release date: 22 February 1951 (UK)
- Running time: 86 minutes
- Country: United Kingdom
- Language: English
- Box office: £130,000 or $392,000 (UK) $40,000 (US)

Pool of London is a 1951 British crime film noir directed by Basil Dearden, and starring Bonar Colleano, Earl Cameron (in his breakthrough role), Susan Shaw, Renée Asherson and Moira Lister. It was written by Jack Whittingham and John Eldridge. Set in post-war London, the film is of note for portraying the first interracial relationship in British cinema.

The film was produced by Ealing Studios and released by General Film Distributors on 22 February 1951. It was a commercial and critical success.

== Plot ==
The Dunbar, a merchant ship, arrives in the Pool of London, bringing a crew of sailors eager to spend their shore leave in the bustling city. Among them are Dan MacDonald, a streetwise American seaman, and Johnny Lambert, his more reserved Jamaican friend. While Dan seeks excitement and quick money, Johnny experiences London from a different perspective, forming a tentative friendship with Pat, a young white woman who shows him kindness despite the racial prejudices of the time.

Dan is approached by a gang of criminals who offer him a large sum of money to smuggle stolen diamonds out of the country. Unaware of the full extent of their crimes, he agrees, seeing it as an easy way to make extra cash. Meanwhile, Johnny spends his time with Pat, enjoying simple moments of companionship but also facing the unspoken social barriers that make their relationship difficult.

The smuggling plot turns violent when one of the gang members kills a watchman, leading to a major police investigation. As the authorities close in, Dan realizes he has been set up and desperately tries to evade capture. He attempts to return to the Dunbar before it leaves port, but the police track him down. In a final act of defiance and redemption, Dan gives himself up to the police, ensuring that Johnny remains uninvolved in the crime.

As the ship prepares to depart, Johnny, deeply affected by Dan’s fate, reflects on his time in London and the challenges he faces as a Black man in British society.

== Cast ==
- Bonar Colleano as Dan MacDonald
- Earl Cameron as Johnny Lambert
- Susan Shaw as Pat
- Renée Asherson as Sally
- Moira Lister as Maisie
- Max Adrian as Charlie Vernon
- Joan Dowling as Pamela
- James Robertson Justice as Chief Engineer Trotter
- Michael Golden as Customs Officer Andrews
- John Longden as Detective Inspector Williams
- Alfie Bass as Alf
- Christopher Hewett as Mike
- Leslie Phillips as Harry
- Ian Bannen as Garage attendant
- George Benson as George
- Beckett Bould as Watchman
- Sam Kydd as Engineer
- Victor Maddern as Tram conductor
- Laurence Naismith as Commissionaire
- Campbell Singer as Station sergeant

== Release ==
Pool of London premiered at the Odeon Leicester Square in London on 22 February 1951.

== Reception ==
=== Box office ===
The film was a hit at the British box office, being judged by Kinematograph Weekly as a "notable performer" at British cinemas in 1951.

=== Critical response ===
The Monthly Film Bulletin wrote: "Pool of London is closely modelled on Dearden's earlier picture, The Blue Lamp, telling the same sort of melodramatic crime story in a realistic setting – the river landmarks, the workings of customs officers and river police. A third element is provided by the abortive love of the coloured sailor for the London girl. The mixture has not fused into a whole. The central theme advances in a curiously jerky and disorganised manner; the excitement which the story does not sustain is occasionally whipped up by artificial means – such as the crime itself, and the capture of the crooks – but this tends to produce only the effect of a series of anti-climaxes resulting in a lack of co-ordination and of rhythm. ... Pool of London has the elements of an average melodrama, but they are never satisfactorily brought together, and the result is a diffuse film, lacking shape and control."

In The New York Times, Bosley Crowther wrote, "there is excitement and suspense in the gritty and grimy melodramatics," and concluded that the film, "though not distinguished, is entertaining and has the flavor of a great shipping port."

== See also ==
- London in film
