= Eight Iron Men =

1952 American film

- Mary Castle on poster
- Directed by: Edward Dmytryk
- Screenplay by: Harry Brown
- Based on: A Sound of Hunting; 1945 play by Harry Brown
- Produced by: Stanley Kramer
- Starring: Bonar Colleano; Arthur Franz; Lee Marvin; Richard Kiley; Mary Castle
- Cinematography: J. Roy Hunt
- Edited by: Aaron Stell, Harry W. Gerstad
- Music by: Leith Stevens
- Production company: Stanley Kramer Productions
- Distributed by: Columbia Pictures
- Release date: October 24, 1952 (Hartford, Connecticut)
- Running time: 80 minutes
- Country: United States
- Language: English

Eight Iron Men is a 1952 American World War II drama film directed by Edward Dmytryk, produced by Stanley Kramer and starring Bonar Colleano, Arthur Franz, Lee Marvin, Richard Kiley and Mary Castle.

== Plot ==
American infantrymen Carter, Ferguson and Small are returning from patrol in a bomb-ridden town when they are forced to take cover by an enemy machine gun. Coke, who was separated from the patrol, returns to the squad's basement outpost where Collucci is sleeping, dreaming of a beautiful woman. Walsh, a runner from company headquarters delivers a package and informs them that the regiment is to be move back from the line that night. Another patrol returns with Sgt. Mooney and privates Spiros and Muller. The package contains a fruitcake that the men divide into eight pieces.

Carter and Ferguson are able to reach the basement, but the clumsy Small trips and is trapped in a shell hole by the machine gun. Sgt. Mooney asks his platoon leader Lt. Crane to rescue him that night. Crane says he will ask Capt. Trelawny, the company commander, but a sniper kills him on the way. The men debate about trying to rescue Small, and Collucci tries to persuade Muller to allow him to eat Small's piece of fruitcake. Finally, Mooney gets tired of waiting and sees Trelawney. The captain orders Mooney not to attempt a rescue, as it might cost more lives.

A runner alerts the squad that the company is departing in half an hour, but another burst of machine-gun fire finally pushes Mooney over the edge. He takes Coke, Muller and a mortar and leaves to try to rescue Small. Trelawny hears the mortar fire and angrily confronts Carter for failing to stop Mooney. However, Carter persuades Trelawny to overlook it.

Mooney returns and reports that they were unable to reach Small and says that he is dead. When Collucci is nearly killed by a sniper and returns fire with his Thompson submachine gun, the squad realizes that he has gone after Small. Using a disabled tank as cover to get close, he tosses grenades that destroy the machine-gun nest. Collucci returns carrying Small, who had sprained his ankle, injected himself with morphine and slept through the whole ordeal. His comrades are annoyed. As the men leave, Collucci grabs the last piece of fruitcake and starts eating it.

== Cast ==
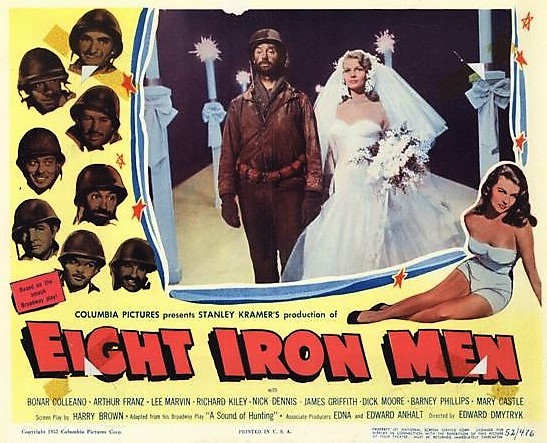
1952 lobby card

- Bonar Colleano as Pvt. Collucci
- Arthur Franz as Carter
- Lee Marvin as Sgt. Joe Mooney
- Richard Kiley as Pvt. Coke
- Nick Dennis as Pvt. Spiros
- James Griffith as Pvt. Ferguson
- Dickie Moore as Pvt. Muller
- George Cooper as Pvt. Small
- Barney Phillips as Captain Trelawny
- Robert Nichols as Walsh
- Richard Grayson as Lieutenant Crane
- Douglas Henderson as Hunter
- Mary Castle as Girl
- Angela Stevens as Girl in Daydream (uncredited)
- Kathleen O'Malley as Girl in Daydream (uncredited)
- Sue Casey as Girl in Daydream (uncredited)

== Release ==
Eight Iron Men premiered in Hartford, Connecticut on October 24, 1952, with Mary Castle in attendance.

== Production ==
The screenplay was written by Harry Brown was based on his 1945 play A Sound of Hunting, which had played on Broadway in 1945 for only 23 performances.

== Reception ==
In a contemporary review for The New York Times, critic Bosley Crowther wrote: "Although a great deal of shooting occurs in 'Eight Iron Men,' it would be not only painful but wholly misleading to say that a brand new year of movies has opened with a bang. This film, from 'A Sound of Hunting,' which was a play by Harry Brown, done in 1945 on Broadway, is a dismally meretricious thing, half of it smoldering dugout drama and the other half cheesecake burlesque. ... Mr. Brown's war-worn play, adapted by him for this project, comes off a crass and pointless film."
