= No Time to Die (1958 film) =

1958 British film by Terence Young

- British release quad film poster
- Directed by: Terence Young
- Written by: Richard Maibaum; Terence Young
- Based on: No Time to Die by Ronald Kemp
- Produced by: Irving Allen; Albert Broccoli
- Starring: Victor Mature; Leo Genn; Anthony Newly; Bonar Colleano; Anne Aubrey; Luciana Paluzzi
- Cinematography: Ted Moore
- Edited by: Bert Rule
- Music by: Kenneth V. Jones
- Production company: Warwick Films
- Distributed by: Columbia Pictures
- Release date: 12 May 1958
- Running time: 86 minutes
- Country: United Kingdom
- Language: English

No Time to Die (U.S. title: Tank Force!; also known as Tankforce) is a 1958 British war film directed by Terence Young and starring Victor Mature, Leo Genn, Anthony Newley and Bonar Colleano. It is about American sergeant David Thatcher in the British Army during the Second World War.

== Plot ==
In Italian Libya during the North African campaign of the Second World War, a Royal Armoured Corps squadron of British tanks is destroyed in battle by German Afrika Korps panzers. A tank commanded by American Sgt. David Thatcher is hit and he and driver Trooper "Tiger" Noakes bail out. The squadron's attached reconnaissance vehicle, commanded by Sgt. Kendall, becomes stuck in the sand and the crew bail out too. The three survivors are quickly captured and transported to an Italian POW camp run by German Army Captain Ritter.

Unbeknownst to the Axis prison guards, Thatcher had previously tried to assassinate Joseph Goebbels in revenge for the killing of his Jewish wife and tries to escape at every turn before the Nazis discover his secret. The British NCO in charge, Sgt. Kendall, arranges an escape of Thatcher, Noakes, Bartlett, and a Polish prisoner in an ambulance before the Schutzstaffel can detain Thatcher, and the Pole kills the German mole Johnson. They escape through the Libyan Desert in sandstorms, briefly taking shelter at the nightclub of Thatcher's friend Carola in Italian Benghazi before she is accidentally shot by the Italian officer Alberto.

Over the course of the trip the Pole grows increasingly homicidal, indiscriminately killing two German officers the group captures. After Kendall vows to court-martial the Pole when they return home, he allows a Bedouin tribe led by a sheikh loyal to the SS to kill Bartlett and capture the surviving men. When the SS tries to torture Thatcher into confessing, Captain Ritter becomes so disgusted that he helps the men escape and then commits suicide. Kendall takes the sheikh and the SS colonel hostage, but the Pole initiates a shootout that leaves him wounded and the sheikh and the colonel dead. They steal a truck, which is met by a rival group of Bedouins which warn them of a nearby German panzer division. They capture a tank, but Kendall and the Pole are killed while their tank is disabled. However, a British tank battalion arrives to save them. The German panzers are defeated, and Thatcher and Noakes bury Kendall.

== Cast ==
- Victor Mature as Sgt. David Thatcher
- Leo Genn as Sgt. Kendall
- Anthony Newley as Noakes
- Bonar Colleano as The Pole
- Luciana Paluzzi as Carola
- Sean Kelly as Bartlett
- Kenneth Fortescue as Johnson
- Anne Aubrey as Italian Girl
- George Coulouris as Camp Commandant
- Alfred Burke as Captain Ritter
- David Lodge as Maj. Fred Patterson
- Maxwell Shaw as The Sheikh
- Alan Tilvern as Silverio
- George Pravda as German Sgt.
- Percy Herbert as 1st British Soldier
- Kenneth Cope as 2nd British Soldier
- Robert Rietti as Alberto
- Martin Boddey as Gestapo Colonel
- Richard Marner as German Colonel
- Peter Elliott as Italian Officer
- Julian Sherrier as 2nd Italian Officer
- Robert Bruce as Italian Driver
- Bob Simmons as Mustapha
- Andreas Malandrinos as Italian Cook
- Ernst Walder as German Corporal

== Production ==
=== Development ===
The film was initially based on a 1954 novel of the same name by Ronald Kemp, but later received a different script unrelated to the novel with the exception of the title and the setting.

Warwick Productions bought the film rights in 1955 and tried to get Montgomery Clift to star. Sy Bartlett was assigned to write the script.

In March 1957, Merle Miller was hired to rewrite the script. Then Richard Maibaum did a draft. The script eventually became about five Allied soldiers, two Englishmen, a Pole, an American and an Australian, who escape an Italian POW camp in the Second World War.

Alan Ladd, who had made several pictures for Warwick, was mentioned as a possibility as star. In April 1957, Terence Young arrived in Hollywood to find two American leading men for the film. Van Johnson, who had just made a film with Young, was a leading contender. Jeff Chandler turned down the role of Sergeant David Thatcher (and fee of $200,000). In August 1957, Victor Mature signed a two-picture contract with Warwick, No Time to Die and The Man Inside.

=== Filming ===
The film was the first made by Warwick Films after it greatly cut back on its expenses. It was shot over eleven weeks starting 15 August. There were six weeks of location filming in the Libyan Desert, near Tripoli. The Queens Bays Tank Regiment assisted in production of the film.

No Time to Die featured authentic war time Cromwell tanks as well as post-war Centurions and Charioteers as both British and German tanks. In the opening battle, Sergeant Kendall (Leo Genn) commands an AEC armoured car and wears the beret of the Cherry Pickers. Sean Kelly was a South African actor who had been signed by Warwick to a seven-year contract. It was the last in a seven-picture commitment between Warwick and Columbia. When the film was initially released in the United States, it was 20 minutes shorter than the version released in the United Kingdom.

== Reception ==
=== Box office ===
Kinematograph Weekly listed it as being "in the money" at the British box office in 1958.

=== Critical ===
Variety wrote "as a routine adventure yarn, it will probably get by with undiscriminating audiences. But the dialog; situations, artwork and acting are all unremittingly artificial, with even the presence of Victor Mature as star having little to make this piece acceptable to American audiences."

The Monthly Film Bulletin wrote: "No Time to Die is a briskly efficient escape drama pitched on the breathless level of a Boy's Own Paper adventure. The action is swift, lively and implausible. The reasons given for Thatcher's enlistment in the British Army are imaginative – 'I threw a bomb at Goebbels' – and, under the circumstances, Victor Mature acquits himself well, adding a novel touch to Army dialogue with such orders as 'C'mon, let's hit the road', and 'Nice goin', cousin'. The desert photography is extremely impressive."

The Radio Times Guide to Films gave the film 2/5 stars, writing: "Set during the campaign in the Libyan desert, American hunk Victor Mature plays an American who serves as a sergeant in the British army. He organises an escape from an Italian POW camp and is then captured and tortured by a shifty sheikh in league with the Nazis. Every racial stereotype in the book stands to attention as Mature lurches from one heroic deed to the next, culminating in a joust with a Panzer tank." In British Sound Films: The Studio Years 1928–1959 David Quinlan rated the film as "mediocre", writing: "Laughable war film; script is dreadful."

Filmink called it "an excellent war film" and one of the best from Warwick.

== Legacy ==
The 25th James Bond film, 2021's No Time to Die, shares a title with this film, which was directed by Terence Young, produced by Albert R. "Cubby" Broccoli, and written by Richard Maibaum, the original director, producer and writer of the James Bond films.
