= Fire Down Below (1957 film) =

1957 film by Robert Parrish

- US cinema release poster
- Directed by: Robert Parrish
- Screenplay by: Irwin Shaw
- Based on: Fire Down Below; 1954 novel by Max Catto (as Simon Kent)
- Produced by: Albert R. Broccoli; Irving Allen
- Starring: Rita Hayworth; Robert Mitchum; Jack Lemmon
- Cinematography: Desmond Dickinson
- Edited by: Jack Slade
- Music by: Arthur Benjamin; Douglas Gamley; Kenneth V. Jones
- Color process: Technicolor
- Production company: Warwick Films
- Distributed by: Columbia Pictures
- Release dates: 30 May 1957 (UK); 8 August 1957 (USA)
- Running time: 115 minutes
- Countries: United Kingdom; United States
- Language: English
- Budget: $2.3 million
- Box office: $2,050,000 (US only)

Fire Down Below is a 1957 adventure drama film with a screenplay written by novelist Irwin Shaw, starring Rita Hayworth, Robert Mitchum and Jack Lemmon, and directed by Robert Parrish. Based on Max Catto's 1954 novel with the same title, the picture was made by Warwick Films on location in Trinidad and Tobago, in Technicolor and CinemaScope, and released by Columbia Pictures.

== Plot ==
After the Korean War, Americans Tony and Felix own a tramp boat, the Ruby, which they use for small-scale smuggling around the Caribbean, along with a crewman, Jimmy Jean. One day their bartender contact, Miguel, introduces them to an American businessman who has been enjoying the company of beautiful but passport-less European goddess, Irena. He has to return to Detroit, but wants to arrange for her to get to another island. They are reluctant, but $1,200 proves very tempting.

On the voyage, Tony starts falling in love with her. Knowing the kind of woman she is, Felix does his best to protect him by warning Irena to stay away from Tony. However, Felix starts falling for her himself. When she disembarks, Tony goes with her, ending his partnership with Felix.

Tony visits a drunk Felix and offers a final job together, but Felix rejects the offer, feeling hurt by his friend's abandonment, and warns that Irena will leave him. Jimmy brushes the warning off.

Tony and Jimmy Jean take on a shady job, but are intercepted by the authorities. They abandon ship and swim to an island to avoid arrest. Tony takes a job on a cargo ship to get back to Irena. He also plans to kill Felix, correctly suspecting that his former partner tipped off the customs agents to get rid of the competition for Irena. While Tony is away, she goes to Felix and confesses that she loves him.

After a collision, Tony is trapped below deck under a girder, with time running out – the ship is aflame and carrying a highly explosive cargo. Doctor Sam Blake offers the only way out, by amputating Tony's trapped legs, but Tony would rather die. Felix goes aboard and stays with him. An explosion frees Tony from the wreckage, and Felix carries him to safety.

After Tony has recovered, he confronts Felix and Irena in a bar. It is there Tony realises that Irena loves Felix and not him, leaving him to walk away and cut his losses by saying, "Some days you win, some days you lose."

== Cast ==
- Rita Hayworth as Irena
- Robert Mitchum as Felix Bowers
- Jack Lemmon as Tony
- Herbert Lom as Harbour Master
- Bonar Colleano as Lt. Sellars
- Bernard Lee as Sam Blake
- Edric Connor as Jimmy Jean
- Peter Illing as Captain of Ulysses
- Joan Miller as Mrs. Canaday
- Anthony Newley as Miguel
- Eric Pohlmann as Hotel Owner
- Lionel Murton as The American
- Vivian Matalon as 1st U.S. Sailor
- Gordon Tanner as 2nd U.S. Sailor
- Maurice Kaufmann as 3rd U.S. Sailor
- Murray Kash as Bartender
- Maya Koumani as Waitress
- Philip Baird as Young Man
- Keith Banks as Drunken Young Man
- "Stretch" Cox Troupe as the "Stretch" Cox Troupe (also as "Stretch" Cox and His Troupe)

== Production ==
The film was Rita Hayworth's return to motion pictures after a four-year absence. The producer and part-owner of the production company Warwick Films, Albert R. Broccoli, later to become famous as the producer of the first 16 Eon-made James Bond films, makes a cameo appearance in the film as a drug smuggler.

== Release ==
The film had a gala premiere in the attendance of Princess Alexandra of Kent at the Odeon Marble Arch in London on 30 May 1957, and went on general release in Britain the next day. It premiered in the USA two months later, on 8 August 1957.

== Reception ==
=== Box office ===
The film needed to make $5,500,000 to break even, and by October 1957 was going to come in $750,000 short. This financial failure caused Warwick Films to scale back its production.

Irving Allen later used the film as an example of "when you try and get artistic". He elaborated:

I employed one of those genius boys to direct Fire Down Below. It cost us £900,000 and though we had Mitchum and Hayworth we'll lose a million bucks on it. We got away from our action formula and I made the mistake of letting my genius boy get out of line. I can't afford to do that. We've got big overheads.

Filmink called it "a dull retread of Gilda (1946), without that movie’s atmosphere, eroticism or tang."

== Soundtrack ==
- The theme song, "Fire Down Below", was composed by Lester Lee, with lyrics by Ned Washington, and was sung by Jeri Southern.
- All harmonica themes in this film were composed and played by Jack Lemmon.
- The film's soundtrack score was conducted by Muir Mathieson with the Sinfonia of London.

== See also ==
- List of American films of 1957
