= The Kiss of Fire =

1937 film directed by Augusto Genina

- Directed by: Augusto Genina
- Written by: Marcel Achard; Ernesto Grassi; Henri Jeanson
- Based on: Naples au baiser de feu by Auguste Bailly
- Produced by: Raymond Hakim; Robert Hakim
- Starring: Tino Rossi; Michel Simon; Mireille Balin; Viviane Romance
- Cinematography: Robert Lefebvre
- Edited by: Louisette Hautecoeur
- Music by: Vincent Scotto
- Production company: Paris Film Productions
- Distributed by: Les Films Vog
- Release date: 7 December 1937
- Running time: 83 minutes
- Country: France
- Language: French

The Kiss of Fire (French: Naples au baiser de feu) is a 1937 French romantic comedy film directed by Augusto Genina and starring Tino Rossi, Michel Simon, Mireille Balin and Viviane Romance. The film is based on the 1924 novel Naples au baiser de feu by Auguste Bailly. It had previously been made as a 1925 silent film and was later adapted again for a remake, Napoli terra d'amore, in 1954.

It was primarily shot at the Saint-Laurent-du-Var Studios in Nice with some location shooting in Naples. The film's sets were designed by the art director Guy de Gastyne.

== Synopsis ==
Mario Esposito a singer who performs in a Naples restaurant is in love with his owner's niece Assunta and wants to marry her. However through his friend Michel he encounters another woman, Lolita, who lures him away from his true love. Eventually he is able to see the mistake he is making.

== Cast ==
- Tino Rossi as Mario Esposito
- Michel Simon as Michel
- Mireille Balin as Assunta
- Marcel Dalio as Le photographe
- Viviane Romance as Lolita
- Leda Ginelly as Sylvia
- Jane Loury as Tante Teresa
- Joe Alex as Le soutier
- Marcel Bauçay as l'écailler
- Lucien Callamand as Le dîneur
- Jean-François Martial as L'administrateur
- Georges Térof as Le vendeur

== Bibliography ==
- Goffredo Plastino & Joseph Sciorra. Neapolitan Postcards: The Canzone Napoletana as Transnational Subject. Scarecrow Press, 2016.
