= Moira Lister =

South African-British actress (1923–2007)

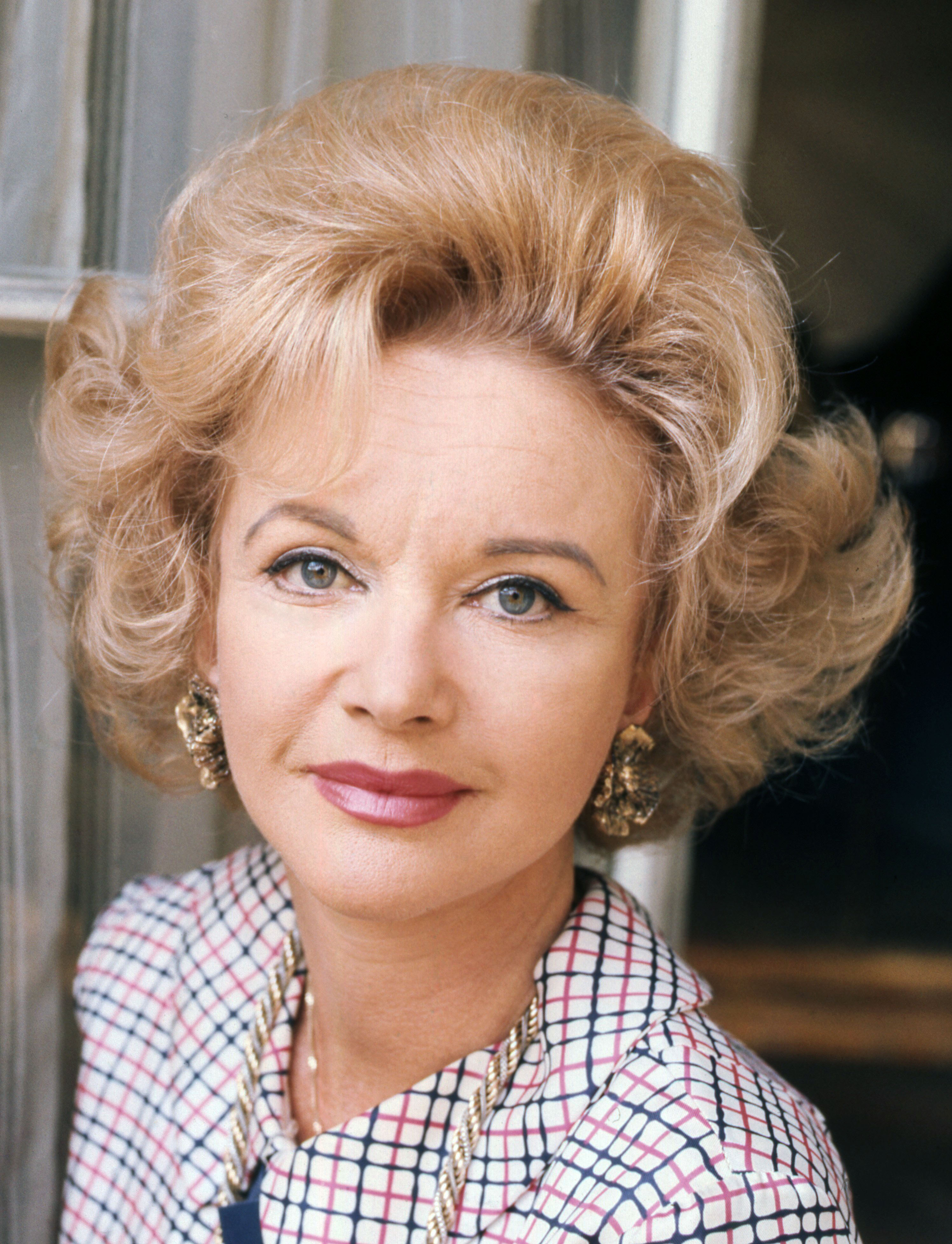
- Lister in 1973
- Born: 6 August 1923; Cape Town, South Africa
- Died: 27 October 2007 (aged 84); Cape Town, South Africa
- Occupation: Actress
- Years active: 1947–2007
- Spouse(s): Jacques Gachassin-Lafite, Viscount of Orthez (m. 1951; died 1989)
- Children: 2

Moira Lister Gachassin-Lafite, Viscountess of Orthez (6 August 1923 – 27 October 2007) was a South African-British film, stage and television actress and writer.

== Early life ==
Lister was born in Cape Town to Major James Lister and Margaret (née Hogan), and educated at the Parktown Convent of the Holy Family in Johannesburg. She studied theatre under Anna Romain Hoffman, who, along with her husband Arthur Hoffman, founded The Johannesburg Repertory Theatre.

== Career ==
Lister began her acting career on stage in South Africa and then went on to act in the London theatre at the age of 18. Lister began working in films in 1943, and appeared in a number of films over several decades. The most notable of these being for Ealing Studios, such as Another Shore (1948), A Run for Your Money (1949), Pool of London (1951) and The Cruel Sea (1953). She starred in Peter Ustinov's long-running 1951 play The Love of Four Colonels in the West End.

She had a regular role in the first series of the BBC radio comedy Hancock's Half Hour in 1954–55, and was also one of the girlfriends in A Life of Bliss starring George Cole as David Bliss, a perpetual bachelor. She played Felicity Willow in BBC Radio's comedy Mr Willow's Wife.

She starred in the BBC television series The Whitehall Worrier and The Very Merry Widow from 1967 to 1968. (Later series of this programme were titled The Very Merry Widow — and How!) Lister also appeared on various other British TV series such as Danger Man and The Avengers ("The See-Through Man", 1967). In 1980, she made a guest appearance as a film star in the sitcom Only When I Laugh.

She was the subject of This Is Your Life in 1971 when she was surprised by Eamonn Andrews.

Lister was still performing until three years before her death, touring with her one-woman show about Noël Coward. She belonged to the British Catholic Stage Guild.

== Personal life ==
In 1946, Lister went on a date in London with Neville Heath, who murdered two women in London only months later. Heath was convicted after a sensational trial, and he was hanged in October 1946.

In 1951, Lister married Belgo-French aristocrat Jacques Gachassin-Lafite, Viscount of Orthez, son of André Gachassin-Lafite, Viscount of Orthez and of Louise van Dievoet. Jacques was a French officer of the Spahis, owner of a champagne vineyard and hero of the Rif War; they had two daughters, Chantal and Christobel. Lister also had two granddaughters, Christina d'Orthez and Marina d'Orthez.

Moira Lister died at the age of 84 in 2007. Both she and her husband are interred in the churchyard of St Edward's Catholic Church in Sutton Green, Surrey.

== Honours ==
- Naledi Theatre Award, a lifetime achievement award for her services to the theatre in South Africa.
- Best Actress of the Year (1971)
- Freedom of the City of London (2000)

== Filmography ==
=== Film ===
Year	Title	Role	Notes
1943	The Shipbuilders	Rita	
1944	A Lady Surrenders	Carol	
1945	My Ain Folk	Joan Mackenzie	
1945	Don Chicago	Telephone Operator	
1945	The Agitator	Joan Shackleton	
1946	Wanted for Murder	Miss Willis	AKA, A Voice in the Night
1948	So Evil My Love	Kitty Feathers	
1948	Uneasy Terms	Corinne Alardyse	
1948	Another Shore	Jennifer	
1949	Once a Jolly Swagman	Dotty Liz	
1949	A Run for Your Money	Jo	
1951	Files from Scotland Yard	Joanna Goring	
1951	Pool of London	Maisie	
1951	My Seal and Them	Diana	
1951	White Corridors	Dolly Clark	
1952	Something Money Can't Buy	Diana Haverstock	
1953	The Cruel Sea	Elaine Morell	
1953	Grand National Night	Babs Coates	
1953	The Limping Man	Pauline French	
1953	Trouble in Store	Peggy Drew	
1955	John and Julie	Dora	
1955	The Deep Blue Sea	Dawn Maxwell	
1957	Seven Waves Away	Edith Middleton	AKA, Abandon Ship
1964	The Yellow Rolls-Royce	Lady Angela St. Simeon	
1965	Joey Boy	Lady Thameridge	
1967	The Double Man	Mrs. Carrington	
1967	Cop-Out	Mrs. Flower	
1973	Not Now, Darling	Maude Bodley	
1989	Ten Little Indians	Ethel Mae Rodgers	
2007	Flood	Grandma	

=== Television ===
Year	Title	Role	Notes
1948	Frieda	Frieda	TV film
1949	And So to Bed	Mrs. Pepys	TV film
1950	Sunday Night Theatre	Senora Maria	"The Bridge of Estaban"
1951	Joseph Proctor's Money	Poppy Marsh	TV film
1954	The Concert	Anne	TV film
1954	The Bear	Yelena Ivanovna Popova	TV short
1954	Stage by Stage	Berinthia	"The Relapse or, Virtue in Danger"
1956	Douglas Fairbanks Presents	Eve	"The Intruder"
1956	ITV Play of the Week	Letty Golightly	"The Golden Cuckoo"
1957	ITV Play of the Week	Maggie Palmer	"His and Hers"
1957	Armchair Theatre	Mathilde Loisel	"The Necklace"
1957	Sunday Night Theatre	Amelia Laurenson	"Mayors' Nest"
1957	Sunday Night Theatre	Orinthia	"The Apple Cart"
1960	Somerset Maugham Hour	Vesta Grange	"Flotsam and Jetsam"
1960	Theatre Night	Nell Nash	"The Gazebo"
1961	Danger Man	Vanessa Stewart	"Find and Return"
1961	ITV Play of the Week	Louise Yeyder	"Gilt and Gingerbread"
1963	Zero One	Mrs. Grey	"The Golden Silence"
1964	Thursday Theatre	Laura Foster	"Simon and Laura"
1966	Danger Man	Claudia Jordan	"The Hunting Party"
1966	Theatre 625	Laura Foster	"Simon and Laura"
1966	Comedy Playhouse	Janet Pugh	"The Mallard Imaginaire"
1966	Major Barbara	Lady Britomart	TV film
1967	The Avengers	Elena	"The See-Through Man"
1967	The Whitehall Worrier	Janet Pugh	TV series
1967–68	The Very Merry Widow	Jacqui Villiers	TV series
1968	A Touch of Venus	Emma Grant	"Desmond"
1968	The Sex Game	Mimsy	"The Lovemakers"
1969	Love Story	Ariade	"The Dolly Spike"
1969	The Very Merry Widow and How	Jacqui Villiers	TV series
1973	Late Night Theatre	Vicky Labone	"She'll Have to Go"
1980	Life Begins at Forty	Gertie	"The Christening"
1980	Only When I Laugh	Gloria	"Whatever Happened to Gloria Robins?"
1984	Hayfever	Judith Bliss	TV film
1987	The Finding	Gran	TV film
2000	The 10th Kingdom	Grandmother	TV miniseries
2005	Sterne über Madeira	Mutter Oberin	TV film

== Publications ==
- The Very Merry Moira (1971)

== Bibliography ==
- « Lister, Moira », in : Oxford Dictionary of National Biography 2005–2008, Oxford : Oxford University Press, 2013, pp. 696–697 .
