= Once a Jolly Swagman =

1949 British film by Jack Lee

- Directed by: Jack Lee
- Written by: William Rose; Jack Lee; Cliff Gordon (additional dialogue)
- Based on: Once a Jolly Swagman by Montagu Slater
- Produced by: Ian Dalrymple
- Starring: Dirk Bogarde; Bonar Colleano; Bill Owen
- Cinematography: H.E. Fowle
- Edited by: Jack Harris; John Ferris
- Music by: Bernard Stevens
- Production company: Wessex Film Productions
- Distributed by: General Film Distributors (UK)
- Release date: 2 January 1949 (London)
- Running time: 100 minutes
- Country: United Kingdom
- Language: English

Once a Jolly Swagman (U.S. title: Maniacs on Wheels) is a 1949 British film starring Dirk Bogarde, Bonar Colleano, Bill Owen, Thora Hird and Sid James. It was written by William Rose and Jack Lee, based on the 1944 novel of the same title by Montagu Slater.

It is centred on the sport of motorcycle speedway racing, which was at its peak of popularity at the time.

The title of the film refers to the first line of the Australian song "Waltzing Matilda".

== Plot ==
Factory worker Bill Fox quits his job to become a speedway rider, helped by his colleagues Tommy Possey and Lag Gibbon. Fox's family and his girlfriend Pat, Gibbons' sister, disapprove of the danger and what they see as speedway's false glamour. Before long Fox becomes the top rider for his team. When Pat and Fox marry, she pleads with him to retire, having seen her brother injured, and when he refuses, she leaves him. But Fox decides that his love for Pat is stronger than his love of riding, and retires.

== Cast ==
- Dirk Bogarde as Bill Fox
- Bonar Colleano as Tommy Possey
- Renée Asherson as Pat Gibbon
- Bill Owen as Lag Gibbon
- Moira Lister as Dorothy 'Dotty' Liz
- Thora Hird as Ma Fox
- Cyril Cusack as Duggie Lewis
- Sidney James as Rowton
- James Hayter as Pa Fox
- Patric Doonan as Dick Fox
- Russell Waters as Mr Pusey
- Dudley Jones as Taffy
- Anthony Oliver as Derek Blake
- Pauline Jameson as Mrs Lewis
- Sandra Dorne as Kay Fox
- Stuart Lindsell as Christopher Yates
- Frederick Knight as Chick
- Michael Kent as solicitor
- Cyril Chamberlain as Jimmy, the reporter
- June Bardsley as WAAF Flight Sergeant

== Production ==
Director Jack Lee later said he enjoyed making the film "because it was physical, there was action and I had good actors."

== Reception ==
The Monthly Film Bulletin wrote: "An authentic story of the dangers of a career based on skill and chance is vividly portrayed in this realistic film of speedway life. All the thrills and spills of speedway racing are conveyed in the excellent track photography. Dirk Bogarde as Bill gives depth to the character by some splendid acting. Bonar Colleano as Tommy provides comedy relief in his inimitable American way, and Bill Owen and Renee Asherson as Lag and Pat head a competent supporting cast. Many scenes are superfluous, and part of the plot irrelevant, but the film is original and entertaining, presenting the "back stage" side of track life with realism and sincerity."

Variety wrote: "Although maintaining a brisk pace for the first half, story is inclined to meander in the last few reels, but with careful pruning it should make a useful attraction for American exhibs. ... The script lacks decision, the story is unnecessarily complicated ...Taken as a whole the acting is good. Full credit goes to Dirk Bogarde as the speedway star and Bonar Colleano is in top form as another rider with a ready wit and a charming streak of sentiment. Bill Owen is not too happily cast as the rider who fails to hold the pace and Renee Asherson's' ability is hardly shown in the part of the young wife."

According to Kine Weekly, the Speedway Riders' Association did not approve of the film, quoting a spokesman: "The film does not give a true interpretation of the sport and does not reflect credit on the riders or the way they live. We object to the general tone of the picture and to the inference that the riders are spivvish. In our opinion it definitely casts a slur on the sport."
