= The Glass Cage (1955 film) =

1955 British film by Montgomery Tully

- U.S. theatrical release poster
- Directed by: Montgomery Tully
- Screenplay by: Richard H. Landau
- Based on: The Outsiders by A. E. Martin
- Produced by: Anthony Hinds
- Starring: John Ireland; Honor Blackman; Sid James; Arnold Marle; Ferdy Mayne; Bernard Bresslaw
- Cinematography: Walter J. Harvey; Noel Rowland
- Edited by: James Needs
- Music by: Leonard Salzedo; John Hollingsworth
- Production company: Hammer Film Productions
- Distributed by: Exclusive Films (UK); Lippert Films (US)
- Release date: 29 August 1955 (UK)
- Running time: 59 minutes
- Country: United Kingdom
- Language: English

The Glass Cage (American title: The Glass Tomb) is a 1955 British second feature mystery film, directed by Montgomery Tully and starring John Ireland, Honor Blackman and Sid James. It was made by Hammer Film Productions. The screenplay was by Richard H. Landau based on the 1945 novel The Outsiders (a.k.a. Common People) by A. E. Martin. J. Elder Wills was the art director. Filming began on July 19, 1954, and it was trade shown a year later. The film's original working title was supposed to be The Outsiders, but it was changed to The Glass Cage instead.

== Plot ==
Showman Pel Pelham (who works contracting sleazy acts for a freakshow carnival) is contacted by an old friend Tony who has received a blackmail letter signed "Delores". Pel agrees to check her out as she lives near a friend of his. Reaching her apartment, he discovers she is an old pal of his named Rena Meroni, who has fallen on hard times and got mixed up with someone she regrets. She agrees to withdraw her blackmail attempt, as it was not her idea.

In the apartment downstairs Pel offers to set up his Russian friend, Sapolio, in a freakshow "starvation act" in a glass cage to break the world record. A party is hastily arranged for that night for their carnival pals. In the evening, Sapolio sees a man going up to Rena's room. During the party Rena is found murdered. The chief suspect is Tony because his blackmail letter was discovered near her body.

Unsavoury character Rorke first attempts to blackmail Stanton, who he knows had a motive; and then also Tony, but the latter draws a gun and in a struggle it is Tony who is killed. Rorke tries to frighten Pel by kidnapping his wife, but she escapes and the police arrest Rorke. Pel tries to get Sapolio to remember who he saw on the night of Rena's murder while he was "starving" in a glass cage. Someone passes strychnine-laced food inside the cage and Sapolio, suffering from the poisoning, breaks the glass and accidentally kills himself. His death is covered up by Pel and the police to tempt the poisoner to come back to finish the job. He falls for the trick and returns only to be confronted by police and shot dead while trying to escape.

== Cast ==
- John Ireland as Pel Pelham
- Honor Blackman as Jenny Pelham
- Geoffrey Keen as Harry Stanton
- Eric Pohlmann as Sapolio
- Sid James as Tony Lewis
- Liam Redmond as Lindley
- Sydney Tafler as Rorke
- Sam Kydd as George
- Ferdy Mayne as Bertie
- Tonia Bern as Rena Maroni
- Arthur Howard as Rutland
- Dandy Nichols as woman with child (uncredited)
- Bernard Bresslaw as Ivan the Terrible, Cossack dancer (uncredited)

== Critical reception ==
Monthly Film Bulletin said "Whatever possibilities were latent in this crime story, the result is so disjointed and jerky as to suggest that at some stage some fairly heavy cutting has taken place. The film's more melodramatic incidents are naively handled, and little is done effectively to exploit its fairground settings and characters."

In British Sound Films: The Studio Years 1928–1959 David Quinlan rated the film as "poor" and wrote: "Fragmented, unsatisfactory thriller bears signs of heavy cutting."

The Radio Times Guide to Films gave the film 1/5 stars, calling it a "bungled yarn".
