= Auguste Bailly =

French writer and historian

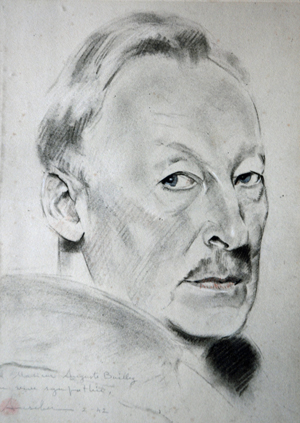
- Born: 8 January 1878; Paris, France
- Died: 22 April 1967 (aged 89); Saint-Laurent-en-Grandvaux, France
- Occupations: Novelist, Journalist, Historian

Auguste Bailly (1878–1967) was a French novelist and historian. Several of his works have been adapted into films, particularly his 1924 novel Naples au baiser de feu which has had four screen adaptations including the 1954 Hollywood film Flame and the Flesh. As a historian he made a particular study of the relationship between King Louis XIII and his wife Anne of Austria.

== Biography ==
Auguste Bailly was admitted to the École normale supérieure (Paris) and passed the agrégation at the age of 21. He was then a boarder at the Fondation Thiers, before embarking on his teaching career. It began at the Alsatian school in Paris, where he taught until 1918, then at the Lycée Pasteur, where he took early retirement in 1936. He used this time to develop his work as a novelist, historian and linguist. He spent the last twenty years at his home in the French Jura.

He was the father of two children, Jean and Jacqueline. Jacqueline married Jacques Decour, a German teacher and writer who became a member of the Resistance and was shot by the Nazis on May 30, 1942 at Mont-Valérien.

Some of his novels have been adapted for the Cinematography.

== Bibliography ==
- Goble, Alan. The Complete Index to Literary Sources in Film. Walter de Gruyter, 1999.
- MacDonald, Roger. The Man in the Iron Mask: The True Story of the Most Famous Prisoner in History and the Four Musketeers. Constable, 2005.
