= Interpol (film) =

1957 British film by John Gilling

- UK theatrical release poster
- Directed by: John Gilling
- Written by: John Paxton
- Based on: Interpol; 1955 novel by A.J. Forrest
- Produced by: Albert R. Broccoli; Irving Allen
- Starring: Victor Mature; Anita Ekberg; Trevor Howard
- Cinematography: Ted Moore
- Edited by: Richard Best
- Music by: Richard Rodney Bennett
- Production company: Warwick Films
- Distributed by: Columbia Pictures
- Release date: 2 April 1957
- Running time: 92 minutes
- Countries: United Kingdom; USA
- Language: English

Interpol (USA title: Pickup Alley; also known as International Police) is a 1957 British-American CinemaScope crime film noir directed by John Gilling and starring Victor Mature, Anita Ekberg, and Trevor Howard. The screenplay was by John Paxton, based on the 1955 non-fiction book Interpol about the agency, by A.J. Forrest. The film was produced by Irving Allen and Albert R. Broccoli for Warwick Films.

It concerns an Interpol effort to stamp out a major drug-smuggling cartel in numerous countries.

In the United States, the film was released as a double feature with The Brothers Rico (1957).

== Plot ==
Charles Sturgis is an FBI agent on the trail of a drug-smuggling operation run by ruthless criminal mastermind Frank McNally, who has murdered Sturgis's sister. He travels to Europe to find McNally and destroy the organisation. In Rome he gets a tip that he can find McNally by following his mistress, Gina Broger. Sturgis is captured and beaten up, then rescued by an Interpol officer. Sturgess tails McNally to New York, where McNally falls to his death from a dockyard crane.

== Cast ==
- Victor Mature as Charles Sturgis
- Anita Ekberg as Gina Broger
- Trevor Howard as Frank McNally
- Bonar Colleano as Amalio
- Dorothy Alison as Helen
- André Morell as Commissioner Breckner
- Martin Benson as Captain Varolli
- Eric Pohlmann as Etienne Fayala
- Peter Illing as Captain Baris
- Sydney Tafler as Curtis
- Lionel Murton as Murphy
- Danny Green as second bartender
- Alec Mango as Salko
- Sidney James as Joe as first bartender
- Marne Maitland as Guido Martinelli
- Harold Kasket as Kalish
- Alfred Burke as Vincent Cashling
- Brian Wilde as the monk
- Betty McDowall as drug addict

== Production ==
Michael Wilding was originally announced for the role later played by Trevor Howard.

The story was based on the files of the International Criminal Police Commission. Filming began on 15 August 1956 and took place in New York, Paris, Rome, Genoa (Italy), Madrid, London and Athens.

== Critical reception ==
The Monthly Film Bulletin wrote: "Despite extensive location shooting in London, Paris, Rome, Athens and New York, and an elaborate, elliptical sub-Welles plot, this film does not escape the common rut. It suffers from obvious and unresourceful type-casting, and badly fumbles its few climaxes. There is a superficial vitality about it – mainly achieved by noise; and Trevor Howard plays with jaded relish."

British film critic Leslie Halliwell said: "Drearily routine thick ear electrified by one performance but not helped by wide screen."

In British Sound Films: The Studio Years 1928–1959 David Quinlan rated the film as "average", writing: "Howard dominates rather sloppy thriller."

The Radio Times Guide to Films gave the film 1/5 stars, writing: "this feeble thriller about tracking down a dope-peddling syndicate by the international police force boasted that it was filmed in London, Paris, Athens, Naples, Rome, Lisbon and New York. It looks as though they sometimes forgot to take the script with them. Trevor Howard obviously relishes acting the master villain for a change, though co-stars Victor Mature and Anita Ekberg don't try to act at all."

== Novelization ==
In advance of the film's release, Avon Books in the US released a novelization of the screenplay under the film's US title, Pickup Alley. It was the first such adaptation by veteran thriller and mystery author Edward S. Aarons as “Edward Ronns,” a frequent pseudonym he would also employ for most of his tie-in work to follow.

== See also ==
- List of British films of 1957
