= Con Colleano =

Australian tightrope walker

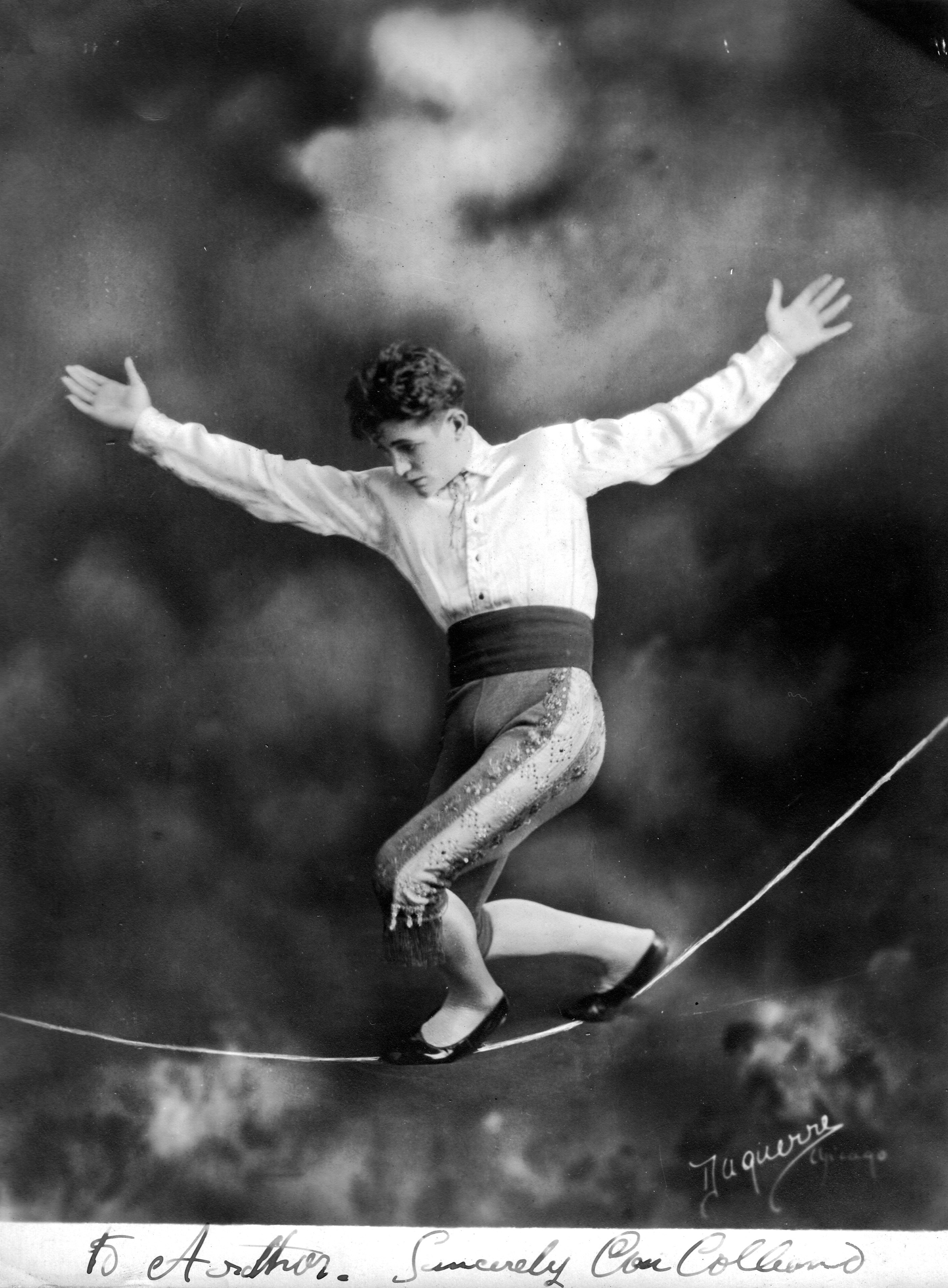
- Born: Cornelius Sullivan; 26 December 1899; Lismore, New South Wales, Australia
- Died: 13 November 1973 (aged 73); Miami, Florida, U.S.
- Occupation: Tightrope walker
- Spouse: Winifred Constance Stanley Trevail

Con Colleano (born Cornelius Sullivan; 26 December 1899 – 13 November 1973) was an Australian tightrope walker. He was the first person to successfully attempt a forward somersault on a tightrope, and became one of the most celebrated and highly-paid circus performers of his time. He was known as "The Wizard of the Wire" or "The Toreador of the Wire". He performed with his nine siblings and a cousin as a circus troupe, touring Australia as well as in South Africa, Europe, and the United states between 1930 and 1950. A 2025 documentary film about the family by Pauline Clague, The Colleano Heart, premiered at the Adelaide Film Festival in October 2025 and was broadcast on NITV and SBS Television in January 2026.

== Early life ==
Colleano was born Cornelius Sullivan in Lismore, New South Wales on 26 December 1899, the son of Cornelius Sullivan (1874–1952), and Julia Vittorine Sullivan (1878–1953), née Robinson, a woman of partial Bundjalung descent, whose father was an Afro-Caribbean man from St Thomas in the Danish West Indies. Colleano was the third of 10 children. His father (reportedly a freed convict) made a precarious living from sideshow "take-on-all-comers" boxing and gambling.

Around 1907, when Colleano was seven years old, the family settled in Lightning Ridge, New South Wales, then a newly established opal mining field, and a fertile ground for the father's talents. Here Colleano received a rudimentary education and learned circus skills from the sideshows present in the town.

== Career ==
By 1910, those of the family of sufficient age had formed a small circus troupe, calling themselves the "Collinos" (apparently as an Italian-sounding name befitting the "sable" complexion of the children, in order to cover the "native blood" in their veins). They travelled through New South Wales, and supplemented their income by working for the major travelling circuses of the time. They also pretended to be Spanish over some periods of time, and also Arab, to hide their heritage.

By 1918, now known as "Colleano's All-Star Circus" (with more of Con's siblings), the troupe was sufficiently established to travel through Queensland on their own hired train. The children became known as "The Royal Hawaiian Troupe" (again to cover for their dark complexions). All ten of the siblings, as well as a cousin, performed as part of the troupe.

In 1919, Con managed to achieve the foot-to-foot forward somersault he had been attempting for some time, which was destined to secure his subsequent career. In 1922, he was engaged by the popular Tivoli circuit, the major outlet for vaudeville in Australia, on a salary of £60 a week. His siblings also appeared at The Tiv as "Eight Akabar Arabs".

=== International fame ===
Having learnt dance moves from his fiancée, soubrette Winifred Constance Stanley "Winnie" Trevail (1900–1986), which he translated to the wire, Con was ready to move overseas to further his career.

At his first performances in South Africa, he was billed as Australian, but in April 1924 he adopted the Spanish toreador persona he was to employ for the greatest part of his subsequent career. In September 1924, he appeared at the New York Hippodrome Theatre and was soon noticed and engaged by Ringling Bros. and Barnum & Bailey Circus, the largest in the country. Colleano close relationship with the Ringling family, especially John and Mabel Ringling.

From the 1930s until the outbreak of World War II in 1939, Con served as the headline performer for the Ringling Bros. circus, earning a substantial weekly salary of US$1,000. During this era, the circus's main tent had a seating capacity of up to 16,000 spectators. Throughout the winter seasons, he toured the European vaudeville circuit. His performances attracted high-profile figures of the period; notably, he performed in Nazi Germany before Adolf Hitler while keeping his Aboriginal heritage concealed and also drew acclaim from Charlie Chaplin and Benito Mussolini.

In 1937, he returned to Sydney, Australia, for a series of performances at the Tivoli ("the Tiv").

Into the 1940s, Colleano continued performing in the United States, and appeared on television on the Texaco Star Theater in 1952. His farm in Pennsylvania became a retreat for his siblings and their offspring between performances and, so established, he adopted United States citizenship together with Winnie in 1950.

Colleano was as "The Wizard of the Wire" or "The Toreador of the Wire".

== Personal life and death ==
In 1956, Con and Winnie returned to Australia where they purchased the Albion Hotel at Forbes, New South Wales. When the venture failed, they returned to America and he resumed his career on the wire to no great acclaim, ending at Honolulu in 1960.

Con and Winnie had no children; Con was the uncle of American actor Bonar Colleano and the great-uncle of American actor Jack Stehlin and Scottish drummer Robbie McIntosh.

Colleano died at his home in Miami in 1973, survived by Winifred, who later returned to Australia and died in 1986 in Sydney. They have descendants in the US.

== On screen ==
In 1925, Colleano bought a camera and started taking home movies of his family on 16 mm film.

The documentary film The Colleano Heart was created by Yaegl filmmaker Pauline Clague. It premiered at the Adelaide Film Festival in October 2025, and aired on NITV and SBS On Demand in January 2026. Clague has a family connection to the Colleanos. Rhoda Roberts was consulting development director for the show.

== Honours and legacy ==
Circus writer and academic Mark St Leon said of Colleano: "What Australia's Don Bradman was to cricket, Australia's Nellie Melba was to opera, so Australia's Con Colleano was to tightwire". He is a direct descendant of the St Leons, one of Australia’s major circus families from 1847 until the 1950s.

- In 1997, Colleano, (together with May Wirth), was honoured by Australia Post on a postage stamp depicting a contemporary poster entitled The Wizard of the Wire.
- Jack Wilson and Joe Keppel met in Colleano's Circus after the First World War; they later formed the act Wilson, Keppel and Betty.
- Con Colleano was inducted into the International Circus Hall of Fame in 1966 and Winifred Colleano in 1975.
- Colleano's name was included in the Circus Hall of Fame, Sarasota, Florida, in 1966.
- He was celebrated in The Flying Fruit Fly Circus show Skipping on Stars (2004), which was a tribute to his life.
- Artist Karla Dickens celebrated his life and that of Indigenous Australian boxers in her multimedia installation, A Dickensian Circus, which went on display at several art galleries in 2020.
- In July 2023, as part of NAIDOC Week, performance group Seedarts performed a show called The Xrossing, a tribute to Colleano, in his home town of Lismore.
- The National Film and Sound Archive holds the Colleano home movies.
- Filmmaker Pauline Clague created a database of around 4,000 newspapers and photographs, working with Gamilaraay family historian and Colleano family relative Deb Hescott.
