= East End, West End =

1958 British TV sitcom

- Genre: Sitcom
- Written by: Wolf Mankowitz
- Directed by: Peter Croft
- Starring: Sid James; Miriam Karlin
- Country of origin: United Kingdom
- Original language: English
- No. of series: 1
- No. of episodes: 6

Production
- Running time: 30 minutes
- Production company: Associated-Rediffusion Television

Original release
- Network: ITV
- Release: 4 February – 11 March 1958

East End, West End is a 1958 British sitcom which was first broadcast in a single series of six episodes by ITV. It was produced by Associated-Rediffusion Television as vehicle for Sid James, who had made his name as the sidekick in Hancock's Half Hour. It was only with his starring roles in the Carry On films that he was able to move out of Hancock's shadow. James was poached from the BBC to make the show. A second series of thirteen episodes was announced but never produced. The scripts were written by Wolf Mankowitz, best known for his depiction of East End life in A Kid for Two Farthings. None of the episodes are known to have survived.

== Synopsis ==
Sid is a small-time Jewish businessman from London's East End always on the look out for a scheme that will make him rich.

== Cast ==
- Sid James as Sid (6 episodes)
- Miriam Karlin (2 episodes)
- Alfie Bass (1 episode)
- Bonar Colleano (1 episode)
- Raymond Huntley (1 episode)
- Walter Fitzgerald (1 episode)
- Penny Morrell (1 episode)
- April Olrich (1 episode)
- Austin Trevor (1 episode)

== Bibliography ==
- Goodwin, Cliff. Sid James: A Biography. Random House, 2011.
- Newcomb, Horace. Encyclopedia of Television. Routledge, 2014.
