= Stuart Vaughan =

American theatre director and manager

John Walker "Stuart" Vaughan
- Born: August 23, 1925; Terre Haute, Indiana, U.S.
- Died: June 10, 2014 (aged 88); High Bridge, New Jersey, U.S.
- Occupations: Theatre director, manager, producer
- Known for: Founding Artistic Director of the New York Shakespeare Festival, Seattle Repertory Theatre, Repertory Theatre New Orleans, The New Globe Theatre, and artistic director of New York's Phoenix Theatre
- Awards: Obie Award (1958), Drama Desk Awar

John Walker "Stuart" Vaughan (August 23, 1925 – June 10, 2014) was an American theatre director, manager, and producer. He was the Founding Artistic Director of the New York Shakespeare Festival, Seattle Repertory Theatre, Repertory Theatre New Orleans, The New Globe Theatre and artistic director of New York's Phoenix Theatre. He also directed several productions off Broadway, for New Jersey Rep, the Riverside Shakespeare Company, and The Public Theater's Shakespeare in the Park. He is a recipient of an Obie Award (1958) and a Drama Desk Award. He was born in Terre Haute, Indiana. He died of prostate cancer in High Bridge, New Jersey in 2014.

== External references ==
- New Jersey Repertory Theater Bio of Stuart Vaughan
