= Saint-Laurent-en-Grandvaux =

Commune in Bourgogne-Franche-Comté, France

- Commune
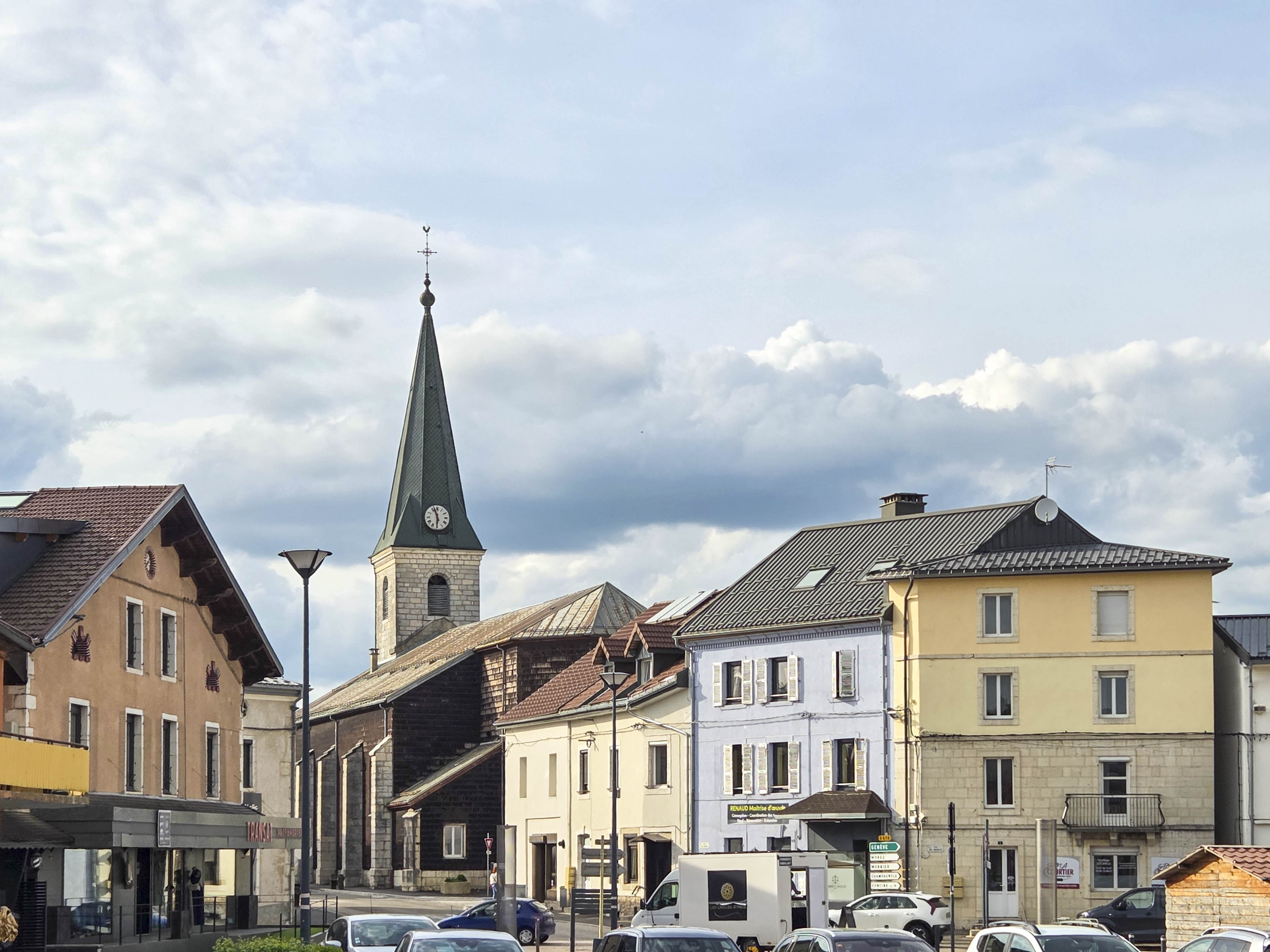
- The city center of Saint-Laurent-en-Grandvaux

- Coat of arms
- Location of Saint-Laurent-en-Grandvaux
- Location within France Location within Bourgogne-Franche-Comté
- Coordinates: 46°34′35″N 5°57′24″E
- Country: France
- Region: Bourgogne-Franche-Comté
- Department: Jura
- Arrondissement: Saint-Claude
- Canton: Saint-Laurent-en-Grandvaux

Government
  - Mayor (2020–2026): Françoise Vespa
- Area^{1}: 17.57 km^{2} (6.78 sq mi)
- Highest elevation: 1,094 m (3,589 ft)
- Lowest elevation: 824 m (2,703 ft)
- Population (2023): 1,815
  - Density: 103.3/km^{2} (267.5/sq mi)
- Time zone: UTC+01:00 (CET)
  - Summer (DST): UTC+02:00 (CEST)
- INSEE/Postal code: 39487 /39150
- ^{1} French Land Register data, which excludes lakes, ponds, glaciers > 1 km^{2} (0.386 sq mi or 247 acres) and river estuaries.

Saint-Laurent-en-Grandvaux (French pronunciation: [sɛ̃ lɔʁɑ̃ ɑ̃ ɡʁɑ̃vo]) is a commune in the Jura department in the Bourgogne-Franche-Comté region in eastern France.

== Population ==
Historical population
Year	Pop.	±% p.a.
1968	1,523	—
1975	1,674	+1.36%
1982	1,735	+0.51%
1990	1,781	+0.33%
1999	1,767	−0.09%
2007	1,736	−0.22%
2012	1,832	+1.08%
2017	1,807	−0.27%
2023	1,815	+0.07%
Source: INSEE

== See also ==
- Communes of the Jura department
