= Bonar Colleano =

American actor (1924–1958)

- Born: Bonar William Sullivan; 14 March 1924; New York City, U.S.
- Died: 17 August 1958 (aged 34); Birkenhead, Cheshire, England
- Occupation: Actor
- Years active: 1944–1958
- Spouses: Tamara Lees (m. 1946; div. 1951) Susan Shaw (m. 1954)
- Children: 2, including Robbie McIntosh
- Relatives: Con Colleano (uncle); Jack Stehlin (great-nephew)

Bonar William Sullivan (14 March 1924 – 17 August 1958), known professionally as Bonar Colleano, was an American actor, long based in the United Kingdom.

== Early life ==
Colleano was born Bonar Sullivan in New York City. He was from a well-known Australian circus family and was a nephew of Con Colleano, the first tightrope walker to perform a forward somersault on the wire. He had childhood experiences with the Ringling Brothers Circus and in his family's circus.

He moved to the United Kingdom when he was 12 so his family could appear at the London Palladium. He spent several years performing in music halls. When war broke out in 1939, he began entertaining troops in Britain. In 1941, he was in a revue titled Piccadixie. As a US citizen residing overseas, he was not required to do military service by the US or UK.

== Career ==
Colleano's first important role came with the popular wartime drama The Way to the Stars (also known as Johnny in the Clouds, 1945), playing an American airman.

He played American servicemen in Wanted for Murder (1946), A Matter of Life and Death (1946), and While the Sun Shines (1947).

Colleano played an Italian in One Night with You (1948), and was in Good-Time Girl (1948) and Sleeping Car to Trieste (1948) and Broken Journey (1948). He worked regularly in radio, appearing in a revue Navy Mixture, and had a lead part in Once a Jolly Swagman (1949).

=== Leading roles ===
Colleano's reputation shot up when cast in the role of Stanley Kowalski in the original English stage production of A Streetcar Named Desire (1949) at the Aldwych Theatre, London, directed by Laurence Olivier and co-starring Vivien Leigh.

His film parts got better. Give Us This Day (1949) was set in the U.S. but shot in England. He was a romantic lead in Dance Hall (1950).

It led to lead roles in films starting with Pool of London (1951) and A Tale of Five Cities (1952). The latter enabled him to display some of his circus skills. He went to the US and starred in a Hollywood production, Stanley Kramer's Eight Iron Men (1952).

He went back to Britain to play the lead in Is Your Honeymoon Really Necessary? (1953), a comedy with Diana Dors, and in Escape by Night (1953).

=== Support parts ===
Colleano had another Hollywood role, a support, in Flame and the Flesh (1954), shot in England and Italy.

He went back to support parts in British films with Time Is My Enemy (1954) and The Sea Shall Not Have Them (1955).

Colleano had good support roles in the oddball Shakespeare derivation Joe MacBeth (1955) and Stars in Your Eyes (1956).

=== Warwick Productions ===
Warwick Productions used him in Zarak (1956). They liked his work and kept him on for Interpol (1957), Fire Down Below (1957), No Time to Die (1958) and The Man Inside (1958). He was also in Death Over My Shoulder (1958).

== Personal life ==
Colleano married actress Tamara Lees in 1946, but the couple divorced in 1951. His second wife was actress Susan Shaw, who descended into alcoholism after his death. Their son Mark Colleano is also an actor.

In 1950, he fathered future Average White Band drummer Robbie McIntosh. Colleano was not married to McIntosh's mother.

=== Death ===
Colleano died in 1958 at the age of 34, when he crashed his sports car (a Jaguar XK140) in Birkenhead shortly after leaving the Queensway Tunnel. He was driving back from Liverpool's New Shakespeare Theatre, where he had been appearing in a stage production of Will Success Spoil Rock Hunter?. His passenger, fellow actor and friend Michael Balfour, required 98 stitches, but eventually recovered.

== Partial stage credits ==
Year	Title	Role	Venue	Notes	Ref.
1943–46	Sweet and Low		Ambassadors Theatre, London		
1943–46	While the Sun Shines	Lt. Mulvaney	UK tour	Replacement	
1944–46	Sweeter and Lower		Ambassadors Theatre, London		
1945	A Bell for Adano	Sgt. Leonard Borth	Phoenix Theatre, London		
1945	A Bell for Adano	Sgt. Leonard Borth	Manchester Opera House, Manchester		
1947	Separate Rooms	Taggert	Strand Theatre, London		
1948	Burlesque	Skid	UK tour		
1949–50	A Streetcar Named Desire	Stanley Kowalski	Aldwych Theatre, London		
1949–50	A Streetcar Named Desire	Stanley Kowalski	Manchester Opera House, Manchester		
1951–52	Jack and the Beanstalk	Simple Simon	UK tour		
1952	The Blue Lamp	Tom Riley	UK tour		
1957	A Hatful of Rain	Johnny Pope	UK tour		
1958	Will Success Spoil Rock Hunter?	George MacCauley	UK tour		

== Filmography ==
=== Film ===
Year	Title	Role	Notes
1944	Starlight Serenade	Himself	
1945	The Way to the Stars	Joe Friselli	
1946	Wanted for Murder	Cpl. Nick Mappolo	
1946	A Matter of Life and Death	An American Pilot	
1947	While the Sun Shines	Joe Mulvaney	
1948	One Night with You	Piero Santellini	
1948	Good-Time Girl	Micky Malone	
1948	Sleeping Car to Trieste	Sergeant West	
1949	Once a Jolly Swagman	Tommy Possey	
1949	Give Us This Day	Julio	
1950	Dance Hall	Alec	
1951	Pool of London	Dan MacDonald	
1951	A Tale of Five Cities	Bob Mitchell	
1952	Eight Iron Men	Pvt. Collucci	
1953	Is Your Honeymoon Really Necessary?	Cmdr. Laurie Vining	
1953	Escape by Night	Tom Buchan	
1954	Flame and the Flesh	Ciccio	
1954	Time Is My Enemy	Harry Bond	
1954	The Sea Shall Not Have Them	Sgt. Kirby	
1955	Joe MacBeth	Lennie	
1956	Stars in Your Eyes	David Laws	
1956	Zarak	Biri	
1957	Pickup Alley	Amalio	
1957	Fire Down Below	Lt. Sellars	
1958	Them Nice Americans	Joe	
1958	No Time to Die	The Pole	
1958	Death Over My Shoulder	Joe Longo	
1958	The Man Inside	Martin Lomer	

=== Television ===
Year	Title	Role	Notes
1946	In the Zone	Davis	TV film
1957	ITV Television Playhouse	Sam Pickens	Episode "The Confidence Man"
1958	East End, West End		1 episode
1958	Doomsday for Dyson	Jackston	TV film
1958	Sunday Night Theatre	Guy Moore	Episode: "Statue of David"
