= List of Metro-Goldwyn-Mayer films (1960–1969) =

The following is a list of films originally produced and/or distributed theatrically by Metro-Goldwyn-Mayer and released in the 1960s.

== 1960 ==
Release date	Title	Notes
February 19, 1960	The Last Voyage	co-production with Andrew L. Stone, Inc.
March 3, 1960	Home from the Hill	co-production with Sol C. Siegel Productions
March 31, 1960	Please Don't Eat the Daisies	co-production with Euterpe
May 13, 1960	Platinum High School	co-production with Albert Zugsmith Productions and Fryman Enterprises
May 25, 1960	The Giant of Marathon	US distribution only
June 23, 1960	The Subterraneans	co-production with Arthur Freed Productions
June 23, 1960	Bells Are Ringing	co-production with Arthur Freed Productions
August 3, 1960	The Adventures of Huckleberry Finn	co-production with Formosa Productions
August 17, 1960	The Time Machine	co-production with Galaxy Films
September 4, 1960	The Day They Robbed the Bank of England	US distribution only; produced by Summit Film Productions, Ltd.
September 22, 1960	All the Fine Young Cannibals	co-production with Avon Productions
September 28, 1960	The Angel Wore Red	
October 6, 1960	Key Witness	co-production with Avon Productions
November 4, 1960	BUtterfield 8	co-production with Afton-Linebrook Productions
November 11, 1960	Where the Hot Wind Blows!	US distribution only; made in France by Cité Films
December 5, 1960	Cimarron	
December 7, 1960	Village of the Damned	made by MGM-British
December 28, 1960	Where the Boys Are	co-production with Euterpe

== 1961 ==
Release date	Title	Notes
1961	The Murder Men	Made for TV; never released in theaters
January 20, 1961	Don Quixote	US distribution only; produced in the Soviet Union by Lenfilm
February 16, 1961	World in My Pocket	US distribution; a Corona Film production in association with Criterion C. C. C. Film
March 10, 1961	Go Naked in the World	co-production with Arcola Pictures Corporation
March 15, 1961	The Secret Partner	
March 29, 1961	Gorgo	US distribution only; produced by King Brothers Productions
April 20, 1961	The Green Helmet	Made by MGM-British
May 3, 1961	Atlantis, the Lost Continent	co-production with Galaxy Productions
June 14, 1961	Ring of Fire	co-production with Andrew L. Stone, Inc.
June 21, 1961	Two Loves	co-production with Julian Blaustein Productions
June 22, 1961	Magic Boy	A Toei Motion Picture Company production
June 22, 1961	The Secret of Monte Cristo	US distribution only; produced by Mid Century Film Productions
July 6, 1961	Morgan, the Pirate	US distribution only; produced by Lux Film and Adelphia Cinematografica
August 10, 1961	The Thief of Baghdad	US distribution only; produced by Titanus
August 16, 1961	The Honeymoon Machine	co-production with Avon Productions
August 25, 1961	Ada	co-production with Avon Productions and Chalmar, Inc.
September 26, 1961	A Thunder of Drums	co-production with Robert J. Enders
October 17, 1961	Bridge to the Sun	A Cité Films production
October 30, 1961	King of Kings	co-production with Samuel Bronston Productions
November 1, 1961	Bachelor in Paradise	co-production with Ted Richmond Productions
December 10, 1961	Invasion Quartet	
December 13, 1961	The Wonders of Aladdin	Distribution only; produced by Embassy International Pictures Corporation
December 14, 1961	The Colossus of Rhodes	A Procusa and Cineproduzioni Associates production

== 1962 ==
Release date	Title	Notes
1962	Private Potter	Made by MGM-British; not released in the US
1962	Tom and Jerry: Festival of Fun	produced by MGM Cartoons
January 7, 1962	Murder, She Said	Made by MGM-British
February 7, 1962	The Four Horsemen of the Apocalypse	co-production with Julian Blaustein Productions
February 9, 1962	Light in the Piazza	co-production with Arthur Freed Productions
March 21, 1962	Sweet Bird of Youth	co-production with Roxbury Productions
April 11, 1962	All Fall Down	co-production with John Houseman Productions
April 18, 1962	The Horizontal Lieutenant	co-production with Euterpe
June 12, 1962	Lolita	Distribution only; produced by A. A. Productions, Ltd. Presented by Metro-Goldwyn-Mayer with Seven Arts Productions. An Anya Production S.A., Transworld Pictures S.A. production
June 20, 1962	Ride the High Country	
June 20, 1962	The Tartars	distribution outside Italy only; A Lux Film production
June 21, 1962	Boys' Night Out	co-production with Kimco Pictures Corporation
July 11, 1962	Tarzan Goes to India	Distribution only; an Allfin production
July 17, 1962	The Counterfeiters of Paris	US and select international distribution only; made in France by Cité Films
July 24, 1962	A Matter of WHO	A Herts-Lion distribution
August 7, 1962	The Wonderful World of the Brothers Grimm	co-production with Cinerama and Gallen Films
August 17, 1962	Two Weeks in Another Town	co-production with John Houseman Productions
September 5, 1962	Damon and Pythias	distribution only
September 7, 1962	The Golden Arrow	distribution outside Italy only; a Titanus production
September 14, 1962	I Thank a Fool	co-production with Eaton Productions
September 28, 1962	A Very Private Affair	distribution outside France only; a Christine Gouze-Rénal production
October 1, 1962	The Savage Guns	Distribution only; produced by Capricorn Productions in association with TECISA, an American-Spanish co-production
October 3, 1962	Duke of the Derby	US distribution; a Franco-Italian CIPRA-CCM production
October 31, 1962	Escape from East Berlin	A Walter Wood production
October 31, 1962	Period of Adjustment	co-production with Marten Productions
November 8, 1962	Mutiny on the Bounty	co-production with Arcola Pictures Corporation; Nominated for Academy Award for Best Picture
November 12, 1962	Kill or Cure	Made by MGM-British
November 16, 1962	The Dock Brief/Trial and Error	Distribution only; produced by Anatole de Grunwald, Ltd.
November 1962	The Main Attraction	Distribution only; produced by Seven Arts Productions
December 5, 1962	Swordsman of Siena	distribution only; a CIPRA production
December 6, 1962	Billy Rose's Jumbo	co-production with Euterpe
December 21, 1962	Arturo's Island	US and select international distribution only; made by Compagnia Cinematografica Champion
December 21, 1962	The Password Is Courage	co-production with Andrew L. Stone, Inc.

== 1963 ==
Release date	Title	Notes
January 30, 1963	A Monkey in Winter	
February 15, 1963	The Hook	co-production with Perlberg-Seaton Productions
February 20, 1963	How the West Was Won	co-production with Cinerama
February 27, 1963	Follow the Boys	
March 9, 1963	Gold for the Caesars	US distribution
March 19, 1963	The Four Days of Naples	A Titanus-Metro production
March 27, 1963	The Courtship of Eddie's Father	co-production with Euterpe and Venice Productions
March 27, 1963	Come Fly with Me	
March 1963	Seven Seas to Calais	US distribution only; European production
April 3, 1963	It Happened at the World's Fair	co-production with Ted Richmond Productions
April 29, 1963	Black Fox: The Rise and Fall of Adolf Hitler	
May 15, 1963	Drums of Africa	co-production with Zimbalist-Krasne Productions
May 29, 1963	The Slave	
May 29, 1963	In the Cool of the Day	co-production with John Houseman Productions
May 1963	Dime with a Halo	
June 5, 1963	Corridors of Blood	US distribution; made in the UK by Amalgamated Productions
June 5, 1963	Lycanthropus	
June 19, 1963	Captain Sindbad	Distribution only; produced by King Brothers Productions
June 24, 1963	Murder at the Gallop	
June 1963	Tarzan's Three Challenges	
July 31, 1963	Cattle King	co-production with Missouri Productions
August 14, 1963	Flipper	co-production with Ivan Tors Films
August 18, 1963	Hootenanny Hoot	co-production with Four Leaf Productions
August 18, 1963	A Ticklish Affair	
August 21, 1963	Cairo	
August 1963	The Young and The Brave	
September 18, 1963	The Haunting	co-production with Argyle Enterprises
September 19, 1963	The V.I.P.s	made by MGM-British
October 8, 1963	Any Number Can Win	
October 16, 1963	Twilight of Honor	
November 11, 1963	Family Diary	A Titanus production
November 13, 1963	Sunday in New York	
November 14, 1963	The Wheeler Dealers	
December 8, 1963	Square of Violence	US distribution only; European production
December 25, 1963	The Prize	

== 1964 ==
Release date	Title	Notes
January 29, 1964	Children of the Damned	Made by MGM-British
January 30, 1964	A Global Affair	A Seven Arts production
February 19, 1964	The Day and the Hour	A Franco-Italian CIPRA-CCM production
February 28, 1964	Two Are Guilty	US distribution; a Franco-Italian Gaumont, Trianon Productions and Ultra Films production
March 6, 1964	Kissin' Cousins	co-production with Four Leaf Productions
March 11, 1964	Mail Order Bride	
March 18, 1964	7 Faces of Dr. Lao	
March 18, 1964	Night Must Fall	
March 1964	Murder Most Foul	
April 1, 1964	Gunfighters of Casa Grande	A Gregor production, in association with Tecisa
May 3, 1964	Tamahine	Distribution only; produced by Associated British Picture Corporation
May 7, 1964	Gladiators 7	US distribution
May 20, 1964	Viva Las Vegas	
May 20, 1964	Rhino!	co-production with Ivan Tors Enterprises
June 3, 1964	Honeymoon Hotel	co-production with Pandro S. Berman Productions
June 10, 1964	Advance to the Rear	co-production with Ted Richmond Productions
June 11, 1964	The Unsinkable Molly Brown	
June 19, 1964	Joy House	US distribution
June 24, 1964	Flipper's New Adventure	co-production with Ivan Tors Films
July 31, 1964	Looking for Love	
August 6, 1964	The Night of the Iguana	
September 3, 1964	The Big Parade of Comedy	A Robert Youngson compilation film
September 22, 1964	Murder Ahoy!	
September 23, 1964	Of Human Bondage	
October 5, 1964	Quick, Before It Melts	
October 8, 1964	The Outrage	
October 27, 1964	The Americanization of Emily	A Filmways picture
November 4, 1964	Your Cheatin' Heart	co-production with Four Leaf Productions
November 12, 1964	The Young Lovers	
December 10, 1964	The Golden Head	Produced by the Hunnia Filmstúdió; unreleased in the US
December 31, 1964	Get Yourself a College Girl	co-production with Four Leaf Productions

== 1965 ==
Release date	Title	Notes
January 29, 1965	Guns of Diablo	Expanded version of the last episode of The Travels of Jaimie McPheeters; not released theatrically in the US
February 19, 1965	36 Hours	
March 5, 1965	The Rounders	
March 17, 1965	Vice and Virtue	
March 22, 1965	Young Cassidy	made by MGM-British
April 1965	Hysteria	Distribution only; produced by Hammer Film Productions
April 1, 1965	Operation Crossbow	
April 14, 1965	Girl Happy	co-production with Euterpe
May 5, 1965	Joy in the Morning	
May 13, 1965	Hercules, Samson and Ulysses	US distribution only; European production
May 13, 1965	The Yellow Rolls-Royce	made by MGM-British
May 19, 1965	Signpost to Murder	
May 1965	Sandokan the Great	US distribution
June 9, 1965	She	
June 23, 1965	The Sandpiper	
June 1965	Zebra in the Kitchen	co-production with Ivan Tors Films
August 4, 1965	Clarence, the Cross-Eyed Lion	co-production with Ivan Tors Enterprises
August 18, 1965	Murder at 45 R.P.M.	
September 8, 1965	Once a Thief	
October 3, 1965	The Hill	Distribution only; made by Seven Arts Productions
October 10, 1965	When the Boys Meet the Girls	co-production with Four Leaf Productions
October 11, 1965	The Loved One	
October 15, 1965	The Cincinnati Kid	A Filmways-Solar picture
November 3, 1965	The Secret of My Success	made by MGM-British
November 17, 1965	Laurel and Hardy's Laughing 20's	A Robert Youngson compilation film
November 24, 1965	Harum Scarum	co-production with Four Leaf Productions
December 10, 1965	A Patch of Blue	
December 31, 1965	Doctor Zhivago	Nominated for Academy Award for Best Picture

== 1966 ==
Release date	Title	Notes
January 5, 1966	7 Women	
January 19, 1966	To Trap a Spy	Film version of an expanded episode of The Man from U.N.C.L.E.
January 26, 1966	Where the Spies Are	
February 2, 1966	The Money Trap	
February 9, 1966	Made in Paris	
March 9, 1966	The Spy with My Face	Film version of a two-part episode of The Man from U.N.C.L.E.
April 2, 1966	The Singing Nun	
April 1966	The Secret Seven	US distribution only; European production
May 17, 1966	The Alphabet Murders	Made by MGM-British
May 18, 1966	Lady L	
May 1966	Son of a Gunfighter	US distribution only; European production
June 9, 1966	The Glass Bottom Boat	An Arwin-Reame picture
June 22, 1966	Maya	Produced by King Brothers Productions
June 22, 1966	Hold On!	co-production with Four Leaf Productions
June 22, 1966	Around the World Under the Sea	co-production with Ivan Tors Enterprises
June 1966	Tiko and the Shark	
August 12, 1966	One of Our Spies Is Missing	Film version of a two-part episode of The Man from U.N.C.L.E.; released theatrically overseas only
October 11, 1966	Mister Buddwing	
October 14, 1966	Hotel Paradiso	
October 28, 1966	The Liquidator	
November 10, 1966	Penelope	
November 23, 1966	Spinout	
December 7, 1966	One Spy Too Many	Film version of a two-part episode of The Man from U.N.C.L.E.; released theatrically overseas only
December 14, 1966	Marco the Magnificent	
December 18, 1966	Blowup	Distributed by Premier Productions, an MGM shell company; made at MGM-British Studios
December 21, 1966	Grand Prix	co-production with Douglas and Lewis Productions, Joel Productions, John Frankenheimer Productions and Cherokee Productions

== 1967 ==
Release date	Title	Notes
January 18, 1967	The Venetian Affair	
January 27, 1967	Hot Rods to Hell	co-production with Four Leaf Productions
January 29, 1967	Return of the Gunfighter	US distribution only; European production
February 3, 1967	The Spy in the Green Hat	Film version of a two-part episode of The Man from U.N.C.L.E.; released theatrically overseas only
February 16, 1967	The 25th Hour	
February 19, 1967	The Scorpio Letters	TV film in the US, theatrical release in other markets
April 5, 1967	Double Trouble	A B.C.W. picture
April 7, 1967	The Karate Killers	Feature film version of two episodes of The Man from U.N.C.L.E.; theatrical release overseas only
May 1, 1967	Welcome to Hard Times	
May 10, 1967	Doctor, You've Got to Be Kidding!	A Trident production
May 24, 1967	Three Bites of the Apple	
June 15, 1967	The Dirty Dozen	
June 20, 1967	Don't Make Waves	A Filmways-Reynard picture
August 9, 1967	Wild, Wild Planet	US distribution only; European production
August 17, 1967	Hate for Hate	US distribution
August 31, 1967	Point Blank	
September 1, 1967	The Fastest Guitar Alive	co-production with Four Leaf Productions
October 13, 1967	Our Mother's House	
October 18, 1967	Far from the Madding Crowd	A Joseph Janni-Vic Films production
October 31, 1967	The Comedians	
October 1967	The Girl and the General	US distribution
November 1, 1967	More than a Miracle	
November 10, 1967	Jack of Diamonds	A Harris Associates production
November 13, 1967	The Fearless Vampire Killers	
December 6, 1967	Eye of the Devil	Made by MGM-British
December 27, 1967	The Last Challenge	
1967	Too Many Thieves	

== 1968 ==
Release date	Title	Notes
1968	A Man Called Dagger	
January 17, 1968	The Biggest Bundle of Them All	
January 22, 1968	Mrs. Brown, You've Got a Lovely Daughter	
February 7, 1968	Sol Madrid	
February 21, 1968	The Power	
March 1, 1968	Day of the Evil Gun	
March 6, 1968	The Rise and Fall of the Third Reich	
March 8, 1968	Stay Away, Joe	
March 20, 1968	Guns for San Sebastian	A CIPRA films, Ernesto Enríquez and Filmes Cinematográfica production
April 6, 1968	2001: A Space Odyssey	made at MGM-British Studios; Inducted into the National Film Registry in 1991.
April 24, 1968	A Stranger in Town	US distribution; made by Infascelli in Italy
May 15, 1968	Battle Beneath the Earth	A Reynolds-Vetter production
June 12, 1968	Speedway	
June 19, 1968	Where Were You When the Lights Went Out?	
June 21, 1968	The Helicopter Spies	Film version of a two-part episode of The Man from U.N.C.L.E.; released theatrically overseas only
July 3, 1968	Dark of the Sun	
July 29, 1968	Kiss the Other Sheik	US distribution
August 15, 1968	A Time to Sing	
August 21, 1968	The Legend of Lylah Clare	
August 1968	A Man, a Horse, a Gun	
September 11, 1968	The Young Runaways	
September 19, 1968	Hot Millions	
September 20, 1968	Revenge for Revenge	
October 13, 1968	The Subject Was Roses	
October 23, 1968	Live a Little, Love a Little	
October 23, 1968	Ice Station Zebra	A Filmways production
November 4, 1968	The Split	
November 14, 1968	The Shoes of the Fisherman	
December 5, 1968	The Impossible Years	A Marten production
December 8, 1968	The Fixer	

== 1969 ==
Release date	Title	Notes
1969	The Wolf Men	Nomination: Academy Award for Best Documentary Feature
January 15, 1969	The Extraordinary Seaman	Made by John Frankenheimer Productions and Edward Lewis Productions
January 22, 1969	Ghosts – Italian Style	US distribution; a C. C. Champion and Les Films Concordia production
February 13, 1969	Mayerling	
March 7, 1969	How to Steal the World	Film version of the final two episodes of The Man from U.N.C.L.E.; theatrical release overseas only
March 12, 1969	Where Eagles Dare	
April 23, 1969	Kenner	
May 1969	The Appointment	A Marpol production; US opening only in 1970
May 21, 1969	The Green Slime	A Ram films production; produced in association with Toei Company
June 11, 1969	Heaven with a Gun	A King Brothers production
June 18, 1969	The Maltese Bippy	
July 30, 1969	The Best House in London	
August 22, 1969	A Place for Lovers	
August 28, 1969	The Gypsy Moths	
September 3, 1969	The Trouble with Girls	
October 8, 1969	Alfred the Great	Made by Bernard Smith Films and MGM-British
October 31, 1969	The Bushbaby	
October 31, 1969	Marlowe	
November 5, 1969	Goodbye, Mr. Chips	An Apjac production made at the MGM-British Studios
November 10, 1969	Flareup	A GMF production

== See also ==
- Lists of Metro-Goldwyn-Mayer films
