= Ron Goodwin =

English composer and conductor (1925–2003)

Background information
- Born: Ronald Alfred Goodwin; 17 February 1925; Plymouth, Devon, England
- Died: 8 January 2003 (aged 77) Brimpton Common, Berkshire, England
- Genres: Classical, pop, orchestral music
- Occupation: Conductor
- Years active: 1948–2003
- Website: rongoodwin.co.uk

Ronald Alfred Goodwin (17 February 1925 – 8 January 2003) was an English composer and conductor known for his film music. He scored over 70 films in a career lasting over fifty years. His most famous works included Where Eagles Dare, Battle of Britain, 633 Squadron, Margaret Rutherford's Murder, She Said films, and Frenzy.

Born in Plymouth, Devon, England, Goodwin learned to play the piano and trumpet from the age of five which allowed him to join the school band. When he was nine, the family moved to Harrow, London, where he attended Willesden County School and Pinner County Grammar School, in Middlesex. From there he went on to study the trumpet in London at the Guildhall School of Music.

Whilst working as a copyist, he formed his own orchestra in his spare time and began arranging and conducting recordings for over fifty performers, which resulted in more than 100 chart successes. He wrote his first feature film score for Whirlpool, with screenplay by Lawrence P. Bachmann. After Bachmann became executive producer at MGM-British Studios in 1959, Goodwin composed and conducted the music for most of its productions, as well as working for other film studios.

In the 1980s Goodwin began concentrating on live orchestral performances and appeared as guest conductor with many symphony orchestras at home and abroad including the Royal Philharmonic Orchestra, the City of Birmingham Symphony Orchestra, the Detroit Symphony Orchestra and the New Zealand Symphony Orchestra.

== Biography ==
=== Early life ===
Goodwin was born in Plymouth to James Goodwin (died 1952), a policeman with the Metropolitan Police Force and Bessie Violet Goodwin née Godsland (died 1966), a clothing machinist and daughter of a labourer. James was originally from London, but had moved to Devon after being assigned to the Metropolitan Police's No. 3 (Devonport Dockyard) Division, marrying Bessie in her birthplace of Devonport in 1920.

Goodwin learned to play the piano by the age of five and returned to London four years later, where he attended Willesden County Grammar School. Whilst there, he learnt to play the trumpet and performed regularly in the school band. Upon the outbreak of World War II, the family moved to Harrow, Middlesex, and Goodwin attended Pinner County Grammar School. It was here that he formed his own band – Ron Goodwin and the Woodchoppers. He later studied the trumpet in London at the Guildhall School of Music.

=== Early career ===
In 1943, after a brief spell as an insurance clerk, Goodwin joined Campbell, Connelly and Company, a music publisher. His job was a copyist and arranger and went on to work in that role for the BBC. He entered the world of movie music through documentary films, which he said was "a very good training". He worked as a ghostwriter for Phil Green, Stanley Black, Geraldo and Peter Yorke among others. From 1949, Goodwin conducted for the Polygon company, arranging and conducting recordings of Petula Clark and Jimmy Young, including the latter's 1951 UK no 1 hit "Too Young". In the 1950s he joined Parlophone, and worked alongside George Martin. He accompanied Peter Sellers on his Goodness Gracious Me album, and began to broadcast and make records with his Ron Goodwin Concert Orchestra.

In 1953, Goodwin began arranging and conducting more than 300 recordings for over fifty performers, which resulted in more than 100 chart successes. He simultaneously made his own series of recordings and broadcasts as Ron Goodwin and his Concert Orchestra, and, in addition, began to compose scores for documentary films at Merton Park Studios. In 1958, Goodwin wrote his first feature film score for Whirlpool, with screenplay by Lawrence P. Bachmann. After Bachmann became executive producer at MGM British Studios in 1959, Goodwin composed and conducted the music for most of its productions, as well as working for other film studios. His singles work included recordings with jazz and calypso singer Frank Holder.

=== Works ===
Goodwin is primarily known for his film music and worked on more than 70 scores during his career. He composed his first feature film, Man with a Gun in 1958 and was quickly followed by The Witness and Whirlpool a year later. Early minor film success followed with several films until 1961 when he composed scores for the first of four Miss Marple films starring Margaret Rutherford, entitled Murder, She Said (1961). He later went on to compose for the remaining three Miss Marple films Murder at the Gallop (1963), Murder Most Foul (1963) and Murder Ahoy (1964). He scored two horror films, Village of the Damned (1960) and its sequel Children of the Damned (1964). His music for war films is particularly well remembered. This includes work on 633 Squadron (1964), Operation Crossbow (1965), Where Eagles Dare (1968), Battle of Britain (1969), for which he (mostly) replaced William Walton, plus Force Ten from Navarone (1978). After requests from the Central Band of the Royal Air Force, the opening from Battle of Britain, originally titled Luftwaffe March, was retitled Aces High and is now regularly played by military bands in the UK.

He wrote the scores for Of Human Bondage (1964), Those Magnificent Men in Their Flying Machines (1965), Alfred Hitchcock's Frenzy (1972, replacing Henry Mancini), two movies featuring Morecambe and Wise, and the Norman Wisdom film, The Early Bird (1965).

Goodwin's score for the 1966 film The Trap is now used by the BBC as the theme to the London Marathon coverage. A 30-second variation of his 1969 composition for the film Monte Carlo or Bust is used as the intro for the BBC Radio Four panel game I'm Sorry I Haven't a Clue.

Goodwin wrote several Disney film scores during the 1970s, including the one used for One of Our Dinosaurs Is Missing (1975). He also composed the music and lyrics for a series of animated films. These included The Selfish Giant (1971), The Happy Prince (1974), and The Little Mermaid (also 1974). Goodwin's last film score was for the Danish-made animation film Valhalla in 1986. He composed the Yorkshire Television start up music used from their launch in July 1968 to the early 1980s, before ITV had breakfast television.

Goodwin wrote the television advertising jingles such as Noddy's chant, "I like Ricicles: they're twicicle as nicicles", and the "Mr Sheen shines umpteen things clean" song, inspired by Those Magnificent Men in Their Flying Machines.

=== Later career ===
By 1987, Goodwin had begun concentrating on live orchestrations which included his "Drake 400 Suite" in 1980 and "Armada Suite" in 1988. His "New Zealand Suite" in 1983 marked a long association with the New Zealand Symphony Orchestra, Goodwin appeared as guest conductor with many symphony orchestras at home and abroad including the Royal Philharmonic Orchestra, City of Birmingham Symphony Orchestra, Bournemouth Symphony Orchestra, Hallé Orchestra, Royal Scottish National Orchestra, Ulster Orchestra, Detroit Symphony Orchestra, New Zealand Symphony Orchestra, Singapore Symphony Orchestra, Australian Pops Orchestra, Danish Radio Orchestra and the BBC Concert Orchestra. Goodwin was guest conductor at the Royal Academy of Music's Festival of British and American Film Music in June 1996.

=== Awards ===
In 1972, Goodwin recorded Somebody Named Ron Goodwin Plays Somebody Named Burt Bacharach and recorded internationally, winning gold and platinum discs awarded by EMI. He won a platinum disc from EMI New Zealand to mark two million sales of the album "Going Places". During his career he won three Ivor Novello Awards, including a lifetime achievement award, and was a Fellow of the City of Leeds College of Music and a Freeman of the City of London.

Goodwin was nominated for the Golden Globe award for best original score for the movie Frenzy (1972).

== Personal life ==
Goodwin was married twice and had a son, Chris, from his first marriage. Ron Shillingford, Goodwin's personal assistant for over twenty years, said of him: "Ron was a musical perfectionist who had a fine rapport with his fellow artists. He was a kind, caring man, with a wonderful sense of humour." Goodwin was enthusiastic about working with young people and was heavily involved with the Hampshire County Youth Orchestra, Worthing Youth Orchestra, City of Leeds College of Music and the City of Birmingham Schools' Concert Orchestra.

The road in which Goodwin lived with his family in Plymouth has since been renamed Goodwin Crescent in his memory.

=== Death ===
In December 2002, Goodwin completed his 32nd consecutive year of Christmas concerts in packed venues across the South of England. However, he had suffered from asthma for many years and the condition had worsened with age. On 7 January 2003, having completed conducting a series of Christmas concerts with the Bournemouth Symphony Orchestra, he returned home and died in his sleep at Blacknest Cottage, Brimpton Common, Hampshire, on 8 January 2003, aged 77.

== Selected filmography ==
- Man with a Gun (1958)
- I'm All Right Jack (1959)
- Whirlpool (1959)
- The Trials of Oscar Wilde (1960)
- Village of the Damned (1960)
- Murder She Said (1961)
- Partners in Crime (1961)
- Man at the Carlton Tower (1961)
- Johnny Nobody (1961)
- Invasion Quartet (1961)
- Village of Daughters (1961)
- I Thank a Fool (1962)
- Kill or Cure (1962)
- Postman's Knock (1962)
- The Day of the Triffids (1962)
- Lancelot and Guinevere (1963)
- Follow the Boys (1963)
- Murder at the Gallop (1963)
- Ladies Who Do (1963)
- Children of the Damned (1964)
- Murder Most Foul (1964)
- Murder Ahoy (1964)
- Of Human Bondage (1964)
- 633 Squadron (1964)
- Those Magnificent Men in Their Flying Machines (1965)
- The Alphabet Murders (1965)
- The Early Bird (1965)
- Operation Crossbow (1965)
- The Trap (1966)
- That Riviera Touch (1966)
- Mister Ten Per Cent (1968)
- The Magnificent Two (1967)
- Submarine X-1 (1968)
- Where Eagles Dare (1968)
- Decline and Fall... of a Birdwatcher (1968)
- Monte Carlo or Bust (1969)
- Battle of Britain (1969)
- The Executioner (1970)
- The Selfish Giant (1971)
- Frenzy (1972)
- Gawain and the Green Knight (1973)
- The Happy Prince (1974)
- Diamonds on Wheels (1974)
- Deadly Strangers (1974)
- One of Our Dinosaurs is Missing (1975)
- Spanish Fly (1975)
- Escape from the Dark (1976)
- Beauty and the Beast (1976)
- Born to Run (1977)
- Candleshoe (1977)
- Force 10 from Navarone (1978)
- The Spaceman and King Arthur (1979)
- Clash of Loyalties (1983)
- Valhalla (1986)

== Sources ==
- Ades, David 2001. "Goodwin, Ron". The New Grove Dictionary of Music and Musicians, second edition, edited by Stanley Sadie and John Tyrrell. London: Macmillan Publishers. ISBN 978-0333608005
- Kennedy, Michael (2006), The Oxford Dictionary of Music, 985 pages, ISBN 0-19-861459-4
