= Murder She Said =

- Directed by: George Pollock
- Screenplay by: David Pursall; Jack Seddon
- Story by: David D. Osborn (adaptation)
- Based on: 4:50 from Paddington by Agatha Christie
- Produced by: George H. Brown
- Starring: Margaret Rutherford; Arthur Kennedy; Muriel Pavlow; James Robertson Justice
- Cinematography: Geoffrey Faithfull
- Edited by: Ernest Walter
- Music by: Ron Goodwin
- Distributed by: Metro-Goldwyn-Mayer
- Release dates: 26 September 1961 (UK); 7 January 1962 (US)
- Running time: 87 minutes
- Country: United Kingdom
- Language: English

Murder She Said is a 1961 British mystery comedy film, directed by George Pollock, based on the 1957 novel 4:50 from Paddington by Agatha Christie. The production stars Margaret Rutherford as Miss Marple, along with Arthur Kennedy, Muriel Pavlow, James Robertson Justice, and Rutherford's husband, Stringer Davis.

MGM-British Studios made three sequels, Murder at the Gallop (1963), Murder Most Foul (1964) and Murder Ahoy! (1965), all with Rutherford starring as Miss Marple. She also cameoed as Marple in MGM's The Alphabet Murders (1965), which starred Tony Randall as Hercule Poirot.

The film marked the first appearance on screen of Christie's female detective "a blueprint for the spinster sleuth who exploits her appearance as a harmless, nosy old woman".

== Plot ==
While travelling by train, Miss Marple witnesses the strangling of a young woman in another train on a parallel track. The police find nothing to support her story, so she conducts her own investigation, and with the aid of her close friend Jim Stringer, comes to the conclusion that the body must have been thrown off the train near the grounds of Ackenthorpe Hall.

Wheedling her way into a job as housekeeper, Miss Marple copes with her difficult employer, Luther Ackenthorpe, and searches for the missing corpse. She eventually finds it concealed in a stable, much to the chagrin of Police Inspector Craddock.

Stringer uncovers the details of Ackenthorpe's will: the family fortune is to go to his long-suffering, attentive daughter Emma; his sons Cedric, Harold and Albert; and Alexander, his intelligent and insightful grandson (A fourth son, Edmund, was killed in the war and a second daughter, Edith, Alexander's mother, died of illness). Also, Dr Quimper, Ackenthorpe's physician, and Emma are secretly in love. The gardener, Hillman, and the part-time servant Mrs Kidder round out the establishment and the list of suspects.

Alexander finds the first clue, a musical compact that plays "Frère Jacques", near where the body must have landed. When Emma reveals that she recently received a letter from a French woman named Martine, who claims that she married Edmund shortly before he died and is therefore an heir, the identity of the dead woman and the motive for the crime seem clear.

Arsenic in the curried duck prepared by Miss Marple sickens all who eat it, but only Albert dies. Then Harold is killed by his own shotgun. The police are unsure if it was suicide by a remorseful murderer or the third victim. Miss Marple, however, is not deceived, and sets a trap, using the compact as bait. Dr Quimper is revealed as the villain. The dead woman was not Martine at all, but his own wife. Quimper feared that the compact, a gift to his wife, could be traced to him. He intended to dispose of the other heirs and marry Emma. He administered a second, fatal dose of arsenic while supposedly attending to Albert.

=== Differences from the novel ===
As with most of her portrayals of Miss Marple, Margaret Rutherford's interpretation was quite different from Agatha Christie's. In addition, Agatha Christie's suspense and underlying darkness are largely replaced by light, even whimsical touches typical of a comedy of manners.

In the novel, an elderly woman named Elspeth McGillicuddy witnesses the murder, not her friend, Miss Marple, who is introduced later. Also in the novel, a young acquaintance of Miss Marple's, not Miss Marple herself, is sent to pose as a housekeeper at the suspect location. The manor house where Miss Marple conducts her enquiries is called Rutherford Hall in the novel, but this was changed to Ackenthorpe Hall in the film to avoid using the leading actress's surname. Crackenthorpe, the family name in the novel, was shortened to Ackenthorpe.

== Cast ==
- Margaret Rutherford as Miss Jane Marple
- Arthur Kennedy as Dr Paul Quimper
- Muriel Pavlow as Emma Ackenthorpe
- James Robertson Justice as Luther Ackenthorpe
- Thorley Walters as Cedric Ackenthorpe
- Charles Tingwell as Inspector Craddock
- Conrad Phillips as Harold Ackenthorpe
- Ronald Howard as Brian Eastley, father of Alexander
- Joan Hickson as Mrs Kidder (Hickson later starred in the lead role of the BBC TV series Miss Marple)
- Stringer Davis (Rutherford's husband) as Jim Stringer
- Ronnie Raymond as Alexander Eastley
- Gerald Cross as Albert Ackenthorpe (Cross would also appear in Rutherford’s fourth film as Miss Marple, Murder Ahoy! playing Lieutenant Commander Dimchurch)
- Michael Golden as Hillman
- Barbara Leake as Mrs Hilda Stainton
- Gordon Harris as Sergeant Bacon
- Peter Butterworth as Ticket collector
- Richard Briers as "Mrs Binster" of Mrs Binster's Employment Agency
- Lucy Griffiths as Lucy (Griffiths would also appear in Murder Most Foul and Murder Ahoy

== Reception ==
=== Critical ===
Murder, She Said maintains an 83% approval rating on Rotten Tomatoes. Almar Halfidason, a critic for the BBC film website, awarded the picture four stars out of a possible five, calling it "delightfully dotty" and "fun".

Agatha Christie disliked this adaptation.

=== Box office ===
The film made a profit of $342,000 (U.S.).

MGM's head of British production, Lawrence Bachmann said it was an "exceptionally satisfactory money spinner" and commissioned sequels.
