= Lucy Griffiths (actress, born 1919) =

English actress (1919–1982)

- in Murder Ahoy! (1964)
- Born: 24 April 1919; Birley, Herefordshire, England
- Died: 29 September 1982 (aged 63); London, England
- Years active: 1953–1981

Lucy Griffiths (24 April 1919 – 29 September 1982) was an English actress whose work spanned from the early 1950s to the early 1980s.

== Biography ==
Born in Birley, Herefordshire, she had a prolific career in both film and television. She is most famous for her roles in numerous Hammer horror films such as Frankenstein and the Monster from Hell (alongside Peter Cushing), The Two Faces of Dr. Jekyll (Christopher Lee), appearances in several of the Carry On series of film comedies, and television programmes such as On the Buses, Mind Your Language, All Creatures Great and Small, Secret Army and Z-Cars. She also had a small, uncredited bit-part in the classic British film Genevieve, as well as several other small uncredited roles in numerous British productions.

== Selected filmography ==
- Will Any Gentleman...? (1953) - Blonde Outside Bank
- Personal Affair (1953) - 2nd Gossip (uncredited)
- Devil on Horseback (1954) - Maid
- One Good Turn (1955) - Nancy (uncredited)
- Children Galore (1955) - Miss Prescott
- The Ladykillers (1955) - Miss Pringle (uncredited)
- Doublecross (1956) - Barmaid
- The Green Man (1956) - Annabel
- A Touch of the Sun (1956) - Aggie
- Gideon's Day (1958) - Cashier (uncredited)
- The Spaniard's Curse (1958) - Minor Role (uncredited)
- Carry On Nurse (1959) - Trolley Lady
- Jack the Ripper (1959) - Salvation Army Woman
- The Ugly Duckling (1959) - Cellist (uncredited)
- Please Turn Over (1959) - 1st Gossip in bookshop queue
- The Flesh and the Fiends (1960) - Crone (uncredited)
- Carry On Constable (1960) - Miss Horton - (voice dubbed by Marianne Stone)
- The Two Faces of Dr. Jekyll (1960) - Tavern Woman (uncredited)
- Carry On Regardless (1961) - Auntie (uncredited)
- The Third Alibi (1961) - Miss Potter
- Murder, She Said (1961) - Lucy
- She Knows Y'Know (1962) - Jenny Higginbottom
- Return to Sender (1963) - Agatha
- Nurse on Wheels (1963) - Lady at Window (uncredited)
- The Mouse on the Moon (1963) - Lady-in-Waiting (uncredited)
- Murder Most Foul (1964) - Miss Rusty (uncredited)
- Murder Ahoy! (1964) - Millie
- Stranger in the House (1967) - Library cleaner (uncredited)
- Carry On Doctor (1967) - Miss Morris - Elderly Patient
- The Magnificent Six and 1/2: When Knights Were Bold (1968) - Frightened Woman
- Carry On Again Doctor (1969) - Old Lady in Headphones
- Carry On Loving (1970) - Woman (scenes deleted)
- Under Milk Wood (1972)
- Follow Me! (1972) - Bertha (uncredited)
- No Sex Please, We're British (1973) - Spinster Lady
- Frankenstein and the Monster from Hell (1974) - Old Hag
- One of Our Dinosaurs Is Missing (1975) - Amelia
- Carry On Behind (1975) - Lady with Hat (uncredited)
- The Hound of the Baskervilles (1978) - Iris
