= Stringer Davis =

English character actor (1899–1973)

- with Margaret Rutherford
- Born: James Buckley Stringer Davis; 4 June 1899; Birkenhead, Cheshire, England
- Died: 29 August 1973 (aged 74); Chalfont St Giles, Buckinghamshire, England
- Years active: 1938–1973
- Spouse: Margaret Rutherford (m. 1945; died 1972)

James Buckley Stringer Davis, generally known as Stringer Davis (4 June 1899 – 29 August 1973), was an English character actor on the stage and in films, and a British army officer who served in both world wars. He was married to actress Margaret Rutherford.

== Early life ==
Stringer Davis was born on 4 June 1899 in Birkenhead, Cheshire, England, son of Bank of England clerk George William Davis (1871–1948) and Ethel, daughter of J. Buckley Deakin, of Prince's Park, Liverpool (1873-1942). The Davis family were landed gentry, of Well Close, Brockworth, Gloucestershire; his first cousin was Admiral Sir William Davis, Vice Chief of the Naval Staff from 1954 to 1957. The name "Stringer" came from a paternal great-grandfather, Miles Stringer, of Effingham Hill, Surrey, whose daughter Adelaide married William Davis, of Well Close. Davis attended the independent Uppingham School and received military basic training there. In August 1918, he volunteered for military service and was sent to the front in the First World War as a lieutenant in the 3rd Battalion, South Lancashire Regiment.

He was discharged from military service in September 1919, about 10 months after the conclusion of the war. Davis's parents separated shortly after his return from the war. His mother lived in a spacious house in Reading, Berkshire, and Davis lived in its vicinity in a boathouse overlooking the River Thames.

== Career ==
Davis had two careers, one in the military and the other in acting. He began his theatrical career as a member of the Oxford Repertory Company, working as both an actor and director. In 1930, he met Margaret Rutherford, his future wife, for the first time. At the time, Rutherford was still largely unknown. She wrote in her autobiography about her first encounter with her husband-to-be: "I noticed his bright blue eyes, his casual elegant clothes and his polite way. I couldn't take my eyes off him... He had that special something. His name was Stringer Davis." He made his on-screen debut in a BBC television live drama Charles and Mary in 1938.

The 40-year-old Davis put aside his acting career to volunteer again for military service in 1939. He served as a lieutenant in the East Yorkshire Regiment and later was part of the British Expeditionary Force deployed in France. He participated in the Battle of Dunkirk and was one of the many British soldiers evacuated on 4 June 1940. Davis remained with the army until almost the end of the Second World War, with tours of duty in North Africa and Northwest Europe.

After the war, Davis resumed his acting career with the film Miranda (1948), which also featured Rutherford. Overall, Davis appeared in more than 20 films with his wife. In later years, she made it a condition of her contract that Davis would play a part in any film in which she appeared. This clause led to Davis being cast as the mild-mannered librarian Mr Stringer in the four adaptations of Agatha Christie novels featuring Rutherford as Miss Marple in the early 1960s. The gentle, timid Mr. Stringer gained good reviews.

== Personal life ==
Davis married Margaret Rutherford in 1945 after a 15-year courtship. She was 53 and he was 46 at the time. Reportedly, his mother was the main reason for the long engagement because she was adamantly opposed to having Margaret Rutherford for a daughter-in-law, referring to her when talking to her son as "that older actress woman you have been seeing over the years." Only after the death of Ethel Davis did the couple finally marry. After their marriage, they remained totally devoted to one another, with Davis always at hand behind the camera whenever his wife was filming.

Towards the end of her life, Rutherford was diagnosed with Alzheimer's disease and Davis tended to her throughout a long and distressing illness. Rutherford died on 22 May 1972, aged 80. A down-on-her-luck former aspiring soprano, Violet Lang-Davis, was employed as Rutherford's daily help and companion; after Rutherford's death, she stayed on to look after Davis, with an eye on marriage. Davis died before Lang-Davis could achieve this goal. His will left everything to the already-deceased Rutherford, meaning that the couple's estate would go to Davis's next of kin, his first cousin Lieutenant-Colonel William James Davis, of Well Close. Lang-Davis, who stood to receive nothing, then unlawfully sold a number of Rutherford and Davis's possessions, and produced a forged will wherein Davis left her everything. To explain the disappearance of the sold items, Lang-Davis claimed a burglary had taken place. Although eventually the truth was uncovered, and Lang-Davis, then aged 63, was arrested and remanded in custody prior to a trial in 1975, she did not appear for the trial and a warrant for her arrest, although issued, was never executed. In 1985, it was thought that Lang-Davis was still at large.

== Death ==
Davis died peacefully in his sleep in Chalfont St Giles, Buckinghamshire in August 1973, 15 months after Rutherford's death. Rutherford and Davis are interred in the graveyard of St James Church, Gerrards Cross, Buckinghamshire.

== Filmography ==
- Charles and Mary live BBC TV drama (1938) – George Dyer
- The Importance of Being Earnest live BBC TV drama (1946) – Merriman
- Miranda (1948) – Museum Attendant
- The Happiest Days of Your Life (1950) – Reverend Rich
- Miss Hargreaves BBC Sunday Night Theatre (1950) – The Dean
- Curtain Up (1952) – Vicar
- Miss Robin Hood (1952) – Board Member
- Castle in the Air (1952) – Hall Porter
- Innocents in Paris (1953) – Arbuthnot
- Trouble in Store (1953) – Shop Assistant (uncredited)
- The Runaway Bus (1954) – 2nd Transport Officer
- Mad About Men (1954) – Vicar (uncredited)
- Aunt Clara (1954) – Dr Graham (uncredited)
- Reach for The Sky (1956) – Cyril Borge
- The March Hare (1956) – Doctor
- The Smallest Show on Earth (U.K.) Big Time Operators (U.S.) (1957) – Emmett
- The Buccaneers TV series (1957) – Admiral Bingham
- Just My Luck (1957) – Goodwood Steward (uncredited)
- I'm All Right Jack (1959) – Reporter
- The Day After Tomorrow BBC TV drama (1960) – Clergyman
- Murder She Said (1961) – Mr Stringer
- Murder at the Gallop (1963) – Mr Stringer
- The V.I.P.s (1963) – Hotel Waiter
- The Mouse on the Moon (1963) – 1st Councillor (uncredited)
- Murder Most Foul (1964) – Mr Stringer
- Murder Ahoy! (1964) – Mr Stringer
- The Stately Ghosts of England (American NBC documentary, Rutherford and Davis appear as themselves, 1965)
- The Alphabet Murders (1966) – Mr Stringer (uncredited)
- Arabella (1967) – Italian Gardener (uncredited)
- Thirty Minute Theatre TV series (1973) – Museum Attendant
