= Murder Most Foul =

"Murder Most Foul" is part of a quotation from William Shakespeare's play Hamlet: "Murder most foul, as in the best it is / But this most foul, strange and unnatural."

It may also refer to:

- Murder Most Foul: A Study of the Road Deaths Problem, a 1947 British road safety publication by the Pedestrians' Association
- Murder Most Foul (1964 film), the third of four Miss Marple films made by Metro-Goldwyn-Mayer
- "Murder Most Foul" (Once Upon a Time), a 2017 episode of the American fantasy series Once Upon a Time
- "Murder Most Foul" (song), a 2020 song by Bob Dylan about the assassination of John F. Kennedy
