= Innocents in Paris =

1953 film by Gordon Parry

- Directed by: Gordon Parry
- Screenplay by: Anatole de Grunwald
- Produced by: Anatole de Grunwald; John Woolf
- Starring: Alastair Sim; Ronald Shiner; Claire Bloom; Margaret Rutherford; Claude Dauphin; Jimmy Edwards
- Cinematography: Gordon Lang
- Edited by: Geoffrey Foot
- Music by: Joseph Kosma
- Production company: Romulus Films
- Release date: 1953
- Running time: 102 min
- Country: United Kingdom
- Language: English
- Budget: £161,462

Innocents in Paris is a 1953 British-French international co-production comedy film directed by Gordon Parry and starring Alastair Sim, Ronald Shiner, Claire Bloom, Margaret Rutherford, Claude Dauphin, Jimmy Edwards, and James Copeland. French comedy actor Louis de Funès appears as a taxi driver, and there are cameo appearances by Christopher Lee, Laurence Harvey and Kenneth Williams. The writer and producer was Anatole de Grunwald for Romulus Films.

== Plot ==
The film is a romantic comedy about a group of Britons flying out from The London Airport for a weekend in Paris in 1953 in a British European Airways Airspeed Ambassador. An English diplomat is on a working trip to obtain an agreement with his Russian counterpart; a Royal Marine bandsman has a night out on the tiles after winning a pool of the French currency held by all the Marines in his band; a young woman finds romance with an older Frenchman who gives her a tour of Paris; an amateur artist searches out fellow painters on the Left Bank and in the Louvre; a hearty Englishman spends the entire weekend in an English-style pub; and a Battle of Normandy veteran is an archetypal Scotsman in kilt and Tam o' Shanter who finds love with a young French woman.

The film displays the mores and manners of the British, and, to a lesser extent, the French, in the early nineteen-fifties. At this time, Britons were allowed to take only £25 out of the country, as £5 British cash and traveller's cheques, and there are several scenes showing how the travellers dealt with this. The film also features a Russian nightclub (of which there were several in Paris at the time), with Ludmila Lopato, a Russian tzigane chanteuse, singing the original Russian version of the song that became "Those were the Days", which became a hit record for Mary Hopkin.

== Cast ==
- Alastair Sim as Sir Norman Baker
- Ronald Shiner as Dicky Bird
- Claire Bloom as Susan Robbins
- Margaret Rutherford as Gwladys Inglott
- Claude Dauphin as Max de Lorne
- Jimmy Edwards as Captain George Stilton
- Mara Lane as Gloria Delaney
- James Copeland as Andy MacGrégor "L'Écossais"
- Gaby Bruyère as Josette
- Monique Gérard as Raymonde
- Peter Illing as Panitov
- Colin Gordon as Customs officer
- Kenneth Kove as Bickerstaff
- Frank Muir as Stilton's friend
- Philip Stainton as Nobby Clarke
- Peter Jones as Langton
- Stringer Davis as Arbuthnot
- Richard Wattis as Wilkinson, Sir Norman Baker's secretary
- The Band of Plymouth Group Royal Marines
- Louis de Funès as Célestin
- Albert Dinan as Louvre doorman
- Jean Richard
- Maurice Baquet
- Ludmilla Lopato as Chanteuse
- Georgette Anys as Madame Célestin
- Polycarpe Pavloff
- Irène de Strozzi
- Grégoire Aslan as carpet seller
- The Can-Can Dancers from The Moulin Rouge, Paris

Uncredited (in alphabetical order)

- Reginald Beckwith as photographer
- Joan Benham as receptionist
- Max Dalban as butcher
- Laurence Harvey as François
- Hamilton Keene as reporter
- Christopher Lee as Lieutenant Whitlock
- Andreas Malandrinos as French customs officer
- Bill Shine as customs officer
- Toke Townley as airport porter
- Kenneth Williams as window dresser at London Airport

== Production ==
The film was produced by the Woolf brothers, John and James.

== Reception ==
The Monthly Film Bulletin wrote: "The seven little stories, treated without wit or style, but with some depressingly suburban efforts at sophistication, are linked by numerous views of the city. ... Of the quartet of stalwart comedians assembled – Margaret Rutherford, Ronald Shiner, Jimmy Edwards and Alastair Sim – only the last named succeeds in rising, briefly, above the mediocrity of the material, and he does that mainly by means of vigorous facial contortions. ... The film may be enjoyed by those for whom no joke is ever too old; others are likely to find the going rather gruelling."

Kine Weekly wrote: "Bright, colourful, yet entirely innocuous, extravaganza, set in naughty Paree. The script fails to give the tip-top players equal chances to shine, but overcrowded as if is, it nevertheless contains laughs for everybody, though all may not respond to the same cracks. It's also staged regardless of cost and effectively varied settings create essential party spirit."
