= Aces High (music) =

1969 orchestral piece by Ron Goodwin

Aces High is a piece of orchestral music by Ron Goodwin in a military march style for the 1969 soundtrack of the film Battle of Britain.

== History ==
The Aces High March was originally entitled Luftwaffe March from the Battle of Britain. In the USA, the title of the composition was Aces High. The music is published by Faber Music.

=== Setting in the film ===
In the film, the music is played during the opening sequence with fifty Heinkel aircraft, which were actually aircraft built by Spain's CASA. These aircraft had been flying in Spain's air force until 1968. These Spanish bomber aircraft also had Rolls-Royce Merlin engines; the aircraft during the war had Daimler-Benz engines. The aircraft had been obtained by Group Captain T.G. 'Hamish' Mahaddie. The famous opening sequence of the film was shot in March 1968 at Tablada Aerodrome (Seville Airport) in Andalusia, southern Spain.

The film was produced by United Artists. There is a scene showing the deserted British Army vehicles at Dunkirk (Operation Dynamo), and a BBC Radio news broadcast (on 18 June 1940) announces In the House of Commons this afternoon the Prime Minister Mr Churchill said - What General Weygand called the Battle of France is over. The Battle of Britain is about to begin (This was their finest hour), after which the Aces High or Luftwaffe March begins. The main titles were made by Maurice Binder. The German commanding officers inspect the fictional II./KG 545 bomber unit or kampfgeschwader (part of 2. Flieger-Division).

== German version of the film ==
The march is not in the German-language-dubbed film, being replaced by Badonviller Marsch and Preußens Gloria.

== Performances ==
The composition is mainly played by military bands and brass bands, and less-frequently by orchestras too, at gala concerts. When the Queen opened the new £35m UK Berlin embassy on 18 July 2000, the band of the Royal Tank Regiment played the music, which was viewed as a faux-pas. The music is popular when performed.

== Musical style ==
The style of the music is distinctively and intentionally German to represent the Luftwaffe. The composition starts in four flats (A flat), then three flats (E-flat), four flats again, five flats (D flat), and finishes in four flats.
