= Joan Benham =

English actress (1918–1981)

- Joan Benham as Lady Prudence Fairfax
- Born: Joan Olive Benham; 17 May 1918; Fulham, London, UK
- Died: 13 June 1981 (aged 63); Westminster, London, UK
- Occupation: Actress
- Years active: 1938–1981
- Spouse: Martin Case (m. 1942)
- Relatives: Olive Sturgess (cousin)

Joan Benham (17 May 1918 – 13 June 1981) was an English actress best known for her portrayal of Lady Prudence Fairfax in the ITV period drama series Upstairs, Downstairs. She was born in London and was the first cousin of Hollywood actress Olive Sturgess.

== Career ==
Although her career mostly centred on television, Benham began her career appearing on the West End stage in the 1940s and continued to appear on the London stage periodically throughout her career. She appeared on Broadway as Helena in the 1954 revival of William Shakespeare's A Midsummer Night's Dream opposite Patrick Macnee as Demetrius.

Joan Benham appeared in sixteen episodes of Upstairs, Downstairs, from the first to the last series, as a Bellamy family friend, Lady Prudence Fairfax. Other London Weekend Television roles for her saw her appear as Mrs. Loftus in the comedies Doctor in the House, Doctor in Charge and Doctor on the Go and as Cecily Foyle, the friend of prison governor Faye Boswell (and a recurring role), in the drama Within These Walls.

Other television programmes she appeared in include Mrs Thursday, Father Brown, The Duchess of Duke Street, Just William and Take My Wife. Her film credits include the Miss Marple movie Murder Ahoy! (1964), Ladies Who Do (1963), Perfect Friday (1970) and Carry On Emmannuelle (1978).

Her last role was as Melinda Spry in the sitcom Terry and June. This episode, The Lawnmower, was broadcast on 13 November 1981, exactly five months after the day she had died, in Westminster, London, aged 63.

== Selected filmography ==
- The Divorce of Lady X (1938) – Wearing a blue gown with a large crystal necklace (uncredited)
- Maytime in Mayfair (1949) – Fashion Editor (uncredited)
- Saturday Island (1952) – Nurse
- Mother Riley Meets the Vampire (1952) – Lady at Police Station (uncredited)
- The Pickwick Papers (1952) – (uncredited)
- Innocents in Paris (1953) – Receptionist (uncredited)
- Dance, Little Lady (1954) – (uncredited)
- The Man Who Loved Redheads (1955) – Chloe
- King's Rhapsody (1955) – Countess Astrid
- Child in the House (1956) – Vera McNally
- Loser Takes All (1956) – Miss Bullen (uncredited)
- Dry Rot (1956) – Blonde
- It's Great to Be Young (1956) – Mr. Routledge's Companion (uncredited)
- A Night to Remember (1958) – Lottie (uncredited)
- The Whole Truth (1958) – Party Guest
- The Heart of a Man (1959) – Grace (uncredited)
- The Crowning Touch (1959) – Daphne
- The Bridal Path (1959) – Barmaid
- Desert Mice (1959) – Una O'Toole
- The Grass Is Greener (1960) – Hairdresser's Receptionist (uncredited)
- I Thank a Fool (1962) – Restaurant Manager
- The V.I.P.s (1963) – Miss Potter
- Tamahine (1963) – Mrs. O'Shaugnessy
- Ladies Who Do (1963) – Miss Pinsent
- Murder Ahoy! (1964) – Matron Alice Fanbraid
- The Wild Affair (1964) – Assistant
- The Limbo Line (1968) – Lady Faraday
- Arthur? Arthur! (1969) – Mrs. Payne
- The Magic Christian (1969) – Socialite in Sotheby's
- Perfect Friday (1970) – Miss Welsh
- The Tales of Beatrix Potter (1971) – Nurse
- Hardcore (1977) – Norma Blackhurst
- Rosie Dixon – Night Nurse (1978) – Sister Tutor
- The Greek Tycoon (1978) – Lady Allison
- Carry On Emmannuelle (1978) – Cynical Lady
