= Village of Daughters =

1962 British film by George Pollock

- Directed by: George Pollock
- Written by: David Pursall
- Produced by: George H. Brown
- Starring: Eric Sykes; Scilla Gabel; John Le Mesurier; Grégoire Aslan; Graham Stark; Warren Mitchell
- Cinematography: Geoffrey Faithfull
- Edited by: Tristam Cones
- Music by: Ron Goodwin
- Production company: George H. Brown Productions
- Distributed by: Metro-Goldwyn-Mayer
- Release date: 13 March 1962
- Running time: 86 minutes
- Country: United Kingdom
- Language: English

Village of Daughters is a 1962 British comedy film directed by George Pollock and starring Eric Sykes, Scilla Gabel, John Le Mesurier, Grégoire Aslan, Graham Stark, and Warren Mitchell. It was written by David Pursall.

== Plot ==
Herbert Harris is a poor traveling salesman who is forced off the bus at a remote Italian village because he has no more money for the fare. There, he finds many single and attractive women who all pursue him madly. Unbeknownst to him, the villagers have a dilemma. Antonio is a wealthy businessman in London who, in accordance with his father's wish, has decided to marry a woman from his ancestral village. He writes to the mayor and asks him to choose. The mayor wants to select his daughter Annunziata, but the other villagers object. The village priest recommends that they leave the matter in the hands of God and let the first visitor to the village be the one to make the decision. That turns out to be Herbert.

== Cast ==
- Eric Sykes as Herbert Harris
- Scilla Gabel as Angelina Vimercati
- John Le Mesurier as Don Calogere
- Grégoire Aslan as Gastoni
- Graham Stark as Postman
- Warren Mitchell as Puccelli
- Yvonne Romain as Annunziata
- Eric Pohlmann as Marcio
- Ina De La Haye as Maria Gastoni
- Peter Illing as Alfredo Predati
- Jill Carson as Lucia Puccelli
- Monte Landis as Faccino
- Talitha Pol as Gioia Spartaco
- Edwin Richfield as Balbino
- Mario Fabrizi as Antonio Durigo

== Reception ==
=== Box office ===
According to MGM records, the film made a loss of $268,000.

=== Critical ===
The Monthly Film Bulletin wrote: "The promising comedy idea degenerates into predictable farce of the hit-and-miss kind – with the accent on the comely misses. The cast, encouraged to overact, indulge themselves enthusiastically. By contrast the familiar TV image of Eric Sykes ... seems positively restrained and by no means unamusing. Yet for all its lack of discipline and indeed comic skill, the film exercises a kind of cheerful charm which at least makes a pleasant change from the ruthless knowingness of so much contemporary British screen comedy."

Kine Weekly wrote: "The picture has a bash at the Italian and French village romp which Continentals do so well and scores many laughs 'playing away.' Eric Sykes, the British Jacques Tati, shows considerable resource as Herbert, Scilla Gabel is a spirited Angelina, and Yvonne Romain, Jill Carson, Talitha Pol, Bettine Le Beau, Dalia Penn and Carol White act competently and fully stretch their brassieres as the other daughters. Gregoire Aslan also does his stuff as the wily mayor, and the supporting roles, too, are ably filled. The asides have an agreeable 'Ealing' tang, and the exteriors are picturesque. A catchy theme song completes a comedy which, though not wildly intoxicating, can be safely depended upon to tickle average audiences' palates."

Variety wrote: "This comedy proves again that a comedian who is a success on television in small doses is not necessarily equipped to carry a complete film. ... A lighter touch by director George Pollock might also have given Daughters a life. However, the lazy atmosphere of Italian village life has a charm that keeps the pic on a reasonably diverting plane. Nothing wrong with that as a comedy idea, but it needed a sharper touch than this one has. Sykes gives a slightly nervous but energetic performance. And such tried troupers as John Le Mesurier, Peter Iling, Gregoire Aslan, Monty Landis, Graham Stark and Erie Pohlmann turn in sound thesping."
