= Gerald Cross =

English actor (1912–1981)

- in Murder Ahoy! (1964)
- Born: 20 February 1912; England
- Died: 26 February 1981 (aged 69); Camden, London
- Occupations: Actor, stage producer
- Spouse: Nuna Davey

Gerald Cross (20 February 1912 – 26 February 1981) was an English actor. Among his credits are Doctor Who, Francis Durbridge's The World of Tim Frazer and the Miss Marple films Murder, She Said (1961) and Murder Ahoy! (1964).

Cross played the part of Arnold Tripp, the editor of the local newspaper, in the early BBC Television soap opera The Newcomers.

He died in Camden Town.

== Filmography ==
Year	Title	Role	Notes
1958	Law and Disorder	Hodgkin	
1961	The Night We Got the Bird	Uncle Arthur	
1961	The World of Tim Frazer	Doctor Killick	TV series
1961	Murder, She Said	Albert	
1964	Murder Ahoy!	Brewer	
1977	Joseph Andrews	Lawyer in Coach	
