= Curtain Up =

1952 British film by Ralph Smart

- Pressbook cover
- Directed by: Ralph Smart
- Written by: Jack Davies; Michael Pertwee
- Based on: On Monday Next by Philip King
- Produced by: Robert Garrett
- Starring: Robert Morley; Margaret Rutherford; Kay Kendall
- Cinematography: Stanley Pavey
- Edited by: Douglas Robertson
- Music by: Malcolm Arnold
- Production company: Constellation Films
- Distributed by: General Film Distributors
- Release date: 12 May 1952 (UK)
- Running time: 81 minutes
- Country: United Kingdom
- Language: English
- Budget: £67,945

Curtain Up is a 1952 British comedy film directed by Ralph Smart and starring Robert Morley, Margaret Rutherford and Kay Kendall. Written by Jack Davies and Michael Pertwee it was based on the 1949 play On Monday Next by Philip King.

== Plot ==
In an English provincial town, Drossmouth, a second-rate repertory company assembles at the Theatre Royal on Monday morning to rehearse the following week's play, a melodrama titled Tarnished Gold.

Harry, their irascible producer, is highly critical of the play, which has been foisted on him by the directors of the company and is unenthusiastic about its prospects. The cast includes Jerry, a young and sometimes keen actor, Maud, a widowed actress who was once famous on the West End stage, Sandra, who is waiting for (and receives) a call from a London producer, her philandering and semi-alcoholic husband, and Avis, a timid young girl who is quickly realising that acting is not for her.

The cast is equally unenthusiastic of the play. Little progress is made. 'Jacko', the stage director, is at his wits end and threatens to resign, his regular habit when things go wrong. Just as matters seemingly cannot get worse, the author of the play, Catherine Beckwith, appears and insists on 'sitting at the feet' of the director.

She and Harry are quickly at each other's throats. Harry tears up most of Act 1 and storms angrily off stage, falling into the pit and injuring himself. Despite the forebodings of the cast, Miss Beckwith insists on taking over the rehearsal according to her own ideas. However, Harry recovers and recasts the play as a period piece.

A week later, to everyone's surprise, the curtain comes down on a triumphant first night.

== Cast ==
- Robert Morley as W.H. 'Harry' Derwent Blacker
- Margaret Rutherford as Catherine Beckwith / Jeremy St. Claire
- Kay Kendall as Sandra Beverley
- Michael Medwin as Jerry Winterton
- Olive Sloane as Maud Baron
- Liam Gaffney as Norwood Beverley
- Lloyd Lamble as Jackson
- Charlotte Mitchell as Daphne Ray
- Joan Rice as Avis
- Charles Lamb as George
- Constance Lorne as Sarah Stebbins
- Maggie Hanley as Mary
- Stringer Davis as vicar
- Joan Hickson as Harry's landlady
- John Cazabon as Mr Stebbins
- Diana Calderwood as set painter
- Sam Kydd as ambulanceman

== Production ==
The film was shot at Isleworth Studios in London with the exterior of the nearby Richmond Theatre standing in for that of Drossmouth. Sets were designed by the art director Geoffrey Drake.

== Critical reception ==
The Monthly Film Bulletin wrote: "Its script, though somewhat childishly obvious, is enlivened by moderately amusing jokes. Robert Morley filibusters his way convincingly enough through the part of Blacker, but the laurels go to Margaret Rutherford as the author. Her personality endows this film with a striking comedy performance."

Kine Weekly wrote: "The picture, steeped in the atmosphere of the theatre, contains as much by-play as plot and more than its fair share of dialogue. The talents of Joan Rice, Kay Kendall, Olive Sloane and other established and promising members of its supporting cast are barely extended, but Robert Morley and Margaret Rutherford make most of their talent weight tell. Although there are a few slapstick interludes, as well as slight romantic touches, the majority of the laughs are echoes of the Thespians' chortles at themselves."

Variety wrote: "The joke of watching the cast struggle with the corny material soon wears thin. Even experienced artists like Robert Morley and Margaret Rutherford, as director and writer respectively, have difficulty in holding the piece together. They make a pitch for unsophisticated appeal, and in that respect succeed."

The notice in The New York Times stated: "the provincial repertory company gets a gentle and mildly whacky going-over in Curtain Up, the British import that began a stand at the Sixtieth Street Trans-Lux on Saturday. It has such assets as Robert Morley and Margaret Rutherford, who easily manage to be quite superior to the threadbare situations in which they are involved, and it has the glaring deficit of being static for lengthy periods. With Curtain Up, the actors have the opportunity of delivering some humorous lines here and there, but not too much else."

In British Sound Films: The Studio Years 1928–1959 David Quinlan rated the film as "average", writing: "Buoyed up by its stars, this is still less funny than the hit stage farce on which it was based."

Leslie Halliwell said: "Fairly amusing farce which has now acquired historical value for the light it throws on the old weekly reps."

The Radio Times Guide to Films gave the film 3/5 stars, writing: "There's a nice irony in the fact that a film about a play in which the author refuses to sacrifice a single word of her text has been loosely adapted from the original stage show. Margaret Rutherford is in fine fettle as the persistent playwright, while Robert Morley gives a performance of polished petulance as the director of the down-at-heel stock company who insists on wholesale changes. This amusing dig at showbiz preciousness is most agreeable."

Allmovie wrote that "the delectable Kay Kendall provides a few sublime moments as the velvet-voiced leading lady."
