= The Happiest Days of Your Life (film) =

1950 British film by Frank Launder

- Original trade ad poster
- Directed by: Frank Launder
- Written by: John Dighton; Frank Launder
- Produced by: Frank Launder; Sidney Gilliat; Alexander Korda (uncredited)
- Starring: Alastair Sim; Margaret Rutherford; Guy Middleton; Joyce Grenfell
- Cinematography: Stanley Pavey
- Edited by: Oswald Hafenrichter
- Music by: Mischa Spoliansky
- Production companies: London Films; Individual Pictures
- Distributed by: British Lion Films (UK)
- Release date: 8 March 1950 (UK)
- Running time: 81 minutes
- Country: United Kingdom
- Language: English
- Box office: £278,502 (UK)

The Happiest Days of Your Life is a 1950 British comedy film directed by Frank Launder and starring Alastair Sim and Margaret Rutherford. It was written by John Dighton and Launder based on the 1947 play of the same name by Dighton. It is one of a stable of classic British film comedies produced by Launder and Sidney Gilliat for British Lion Film Corporation. The film was made on location in Liss and at Riverside Studios, London. In several respects, including some common casting, it was a precursor of the St. Trinian's films of the 1950s and 1960s.

== Plot ==
In September 1949, confusion reigns when St Swithin's Girls' School is accidentally billeted at Nutbourne College: a boys' school in Hampshire. The two heads, Wetherby Pond and Muriel Whitchurch, try to cope with the ensuing chaos, as the children and staff attempt to live in the newly cramped conditions (it being impossible to share dormitories or other facilities), and seek to prevent the children taking advantage of their new opportunities.

Additional humour is derived from the departure of the Nutbourne College domestic staff and their hurried (and not very effective) replacement with the St Swithin's School Home Economics class.

The main comedy is derived from the fact that the parents of the St Swithin's girls would consider it improper for their daughters to be exposed to the rough mix of boys in Pond's school, and from the consequent need to conceal the fact that the girls are now sharing a school that's full of boys. Pond is offended at the suggestion that his boys are not suitable company for the young ladies of St Swithin's, but he needs to appease Miss Whitchurch to salvage his chances of an appointment to a prestigious all-boys school for which he is in the running, and which depends on his ability to make a favourable impression upon visiting governors, with whom she is connected.

Matters come to a head when a group of school governors, from the prestigious establishment to which Pond has applied to become the next headmaster, pay a visit at the same time as the parents of some of the St Swithin's girls. Frantic classroom changes are made, and hockey, lacrosse and rugby posts and nets are swapped about, as pupils and staff try to hide the unusual arrangement.

Two simultaneous tours of the school premises are arranged: one for the girls' parents, and a separate one for the governors, and never the twain must meet! The facade finally collapses when the parents become obsessed with seeing a girls' lacrosse match at the same time as one of the governors has been promised a rugby match.

Meanhile, an Ministry of Schools official arrives to declare everything sorted out. "You're a co-educational school, I believe; well I've arranged for another co-educational school to replace St Swithin's next week... Oh, it appears they're ahead of schedule." As several more coachloads of children and staff appear arrive, and utter chaos reigns.

Fade out on Alastair Wetherby and Muriel quietly discussing in which remote and unattractive corner of the British Empire they might best try to pick up the pieces of their respective careers, with her mentioning having a brother who "grows groundnuts in Tanganyika".

== Cast ==
- Alastair Sim as Wetherby Pond
- Margaret Rutherford as Miss Whitchurch
- Guy Middleton as Victor Hyde-Brown
- Joyce Grenfell as Miss Gossage
- Edward Rigby as Rainbow
- Muriel Aked as Miss Jezzard
- John Bentley as Richard Tassell
- Bernadette O'Farrell as Miss Harper
- Richard Wattis as Arnold Billings
- Gladys Henson as Mrs Hampstead
- John Turnbull as Conrad Matthews
- Percy Walsh as Monsieur Joue
- Arthur Howard as Anthony Ramsden
- Harold Goodwin as Edwin
- Laurence Naismith as Dr Collet
- Stringer Davis as Rev Rich
- Olwen Brookes as Mrs Parry
- Russell Waters as Mr West
- George Benson as Mr Tripp
- Angela Glynne as Barbara Colhoun
- Keith Faulkner as Unsworth
- George Cole as Junior Assistant Caretaker at Ministry of Education (uncredited)

== Reception ==
=== Box office ===
The film was successful on its release, being the fifth most popular film and the second-biggest money maker at the British box office for 1950. According to Kinematograph Weekly it was one of the "biggest winners" at the box office in 1950 Britain.

=== Critical ===
The Monthly Film Bulletin noted an "Uninhibited and energetically handled farce... Occasionally slapdash, but frequently amusing."

The New York Times called it "witty, warm, sometimes biting and wholly charming."

BFI Screenonline states that Alastair Sim's portrayal of headmaster Wetherby Pond "is one of his greatest creations", but that both he and Margaret Rutherford were "decisively upstaged" by supporting actress Joyce Grenfell, as one of the teaching staff of St Swithin's.

== Legacy ==
The Belles of St Trinian's (1954), also produced by Launder and Gilliat, is a similar comedy about a girls' school, with Sim, Grenfell, Cole, Wattis and Middleton again appearing, and Ronald Searle again providing cartoons for the titles.
