= Gordon Harris (actor) =

English actor (1917–1965)

- Born: 1917
- Died: 1965
- Years active: 1949–1963

Gordon Harris (1917–1965), was an English actor who appeared in films such as Murder, She Said (1961), Murder at the Gallop (1963), as well as The Navy Lark (1959). Before beginning his acting career, Harris was a professional soldier and served as a Major in the British Army's Devonshire Regiment. He was a secret agent with the Special Operations Executive during World War II.

== Selected filmography ==
- Border Incident (1949) – Bandit (uncredited)
- Forces' Sweetheart (1953) – 1st P.C.
- The Intimate Stranger (1956) – Actor (uncredited)
- Gideon's Day (1958) – CID Man (uncredited)
- I Was Monty's Double (1958) – Staff Sergeant (uncredited)
- The Navy Lark (1959) – Group Captain
- A Touch of Larceny (1960) – 2nd Special Branch Man Jones (uncredited)
- Murder, She Said (1961) – Bacon
- Murder at the Gallop (1963) – Sergeant Bacon
