= Kill or Cure (1962 film) =

British comedy by George Pollock

- Theatrical release poster
- Directed by: George Pollock
- Screenplay by: David Pursall; Jack Seddon
- Story by: David Pursall; Jack Seddon
- Produced by: George H. Brown
- Starring: Terry-Thomas; Eric Sykes
- Cinematography: Geoffrey Faithfull
- Edited by: Bert Rule
- Music by: Ron Goodwin
- Color process: Black and white
- Production companies: George H. Brown Productions; Metro-Goldwyn-Mayer British Studios
- Distributed by: Metro Goldwyn Mayer
- Release dates: September 1962 (UK); 12 November 1962 (NYC)
- Running time: 88 minutes
- Country: United Kingdom
- Language: English

Kill or Cure is a 1962 British comedy film directed by George Pollock and starring Terry-Thomas and Eric Sykes. It was written by David Pursall and Jack Seddon.

== Plot ==
Captain Jeroboam Barker-Rynde comes to a country hotel to assist a wealthy widow. He endures a nature cure diet and exercises under Rumbelow. When the widow is poisoned, Barker-Rynde and Rumbelow join forces to win a reward offered by hotel manager Crossley. Crossley is next murdered, and the clues point to the original criminal.

== Cast ==
- Terry-Thomas as Captain J. (Jeroboam) Barker-Rynde PI
- Eric Sykes as Rumbelow
- Dennis Price as Dr. Julian Crossley
- Lionel Jeffries as Detective Inspector Hook
- Moira Redmond as Francis Roitman, Clifford's secretary
- Katya Douglas as Rita, Green Glades nurse
- David Lodge as Richards, male nurse
- Ronnie Barker as Burton, Hook's assistant
- Hazel Terry as Mrs. Rachel Crossley
- Derren Nesbitt as Roger Forrester (as Derrin Nesbitt)
- Harry Locke as Riggins
- Arthur Howard as Johnson, Green Glades desk clerk
- Tristram Jellinek as assistant clerk
- Peter Butterworth as Green Glades barman
- Patricia Hayes as Lily, waitress
- Anna Russell as Mrs. Margaret Clifford
- Mandy as Horatio
- Sidney Vivian as Fred, Barker-Rynde's assistant (as Sidney Vyvyan)
- Julian Orchard as P.C. Lofthouse

== Production ==
The film was made by MGM's British production arm under Lawrence Bachmann.

== Reception ==
=== Box office ===
According to MGM records, the film made a profit of $89,000.

=== Critical ===
The Monthly Film Bulletin wrote: "Devotees of Terry-Thomas or Eric Sykes may find something to go for in this slapstick farce, and the physiotherapy equipment and the Pekinese also have their moments. Otherwise, however, there is little to distinguish its undemanding humour from that of a multitude of other minor British comedies."

British film critic Leslie Halliwell said: "Flatfooted and unprofessional murder farce whose only pace is slow."

The Radio Times Guide to Films gave the film 1/5 stars, writing: "This is the kind of comedy that could have killed off the British film industry, despite its domestic star-power and the usually reliable writing team of David Pursall and Jack Seddon. When bumbling private detective Terry-Thomas tries to investigate a murder at a posh spa, the only interest is in seeing him lock comedy horns with Eric Sykes and Lionel Jeffries. Unfortunately, it is to little effect."

== See also ==
- List of British films of 1962
