= George Pollock (director) =

English film director (1907–1979)

George Pollock (27 March 1907 – 22 December 1979) was an English film director, best known for bringing Agatha Christie's detective Miss Marple to the big screen for the first time, in films that starred Margaret Rutherford.

== Life and work ==
Born in Leicester, England in 1907, Pollock began his professional career as an assistant film director in 1936. He collaborated in the 1940s with David Lean on such films as Brief Encounter (1945), Great Expectations (1946), and Oliver Twist (1948). His first film as director was Stranger in Town in 1957. However, he is best remembered for bringing the Agatha Christie character Miss Marple to the big screen for the first time in 1961 with Murder She Said. He directed three more Miss Marple adaptations: Murder at the Gallop (1963), Murder Most Foul (1964), and Murder Ahoy (1964) (which was based on an original screenplay). He also directed a 1965 adaptation of Christie's Ten Little Indians.

As well as film, Pollock directed episodes of the TV programmes Interpol Calling, Zero One, Gideon's Way, and Danger Man. One of his final contributions to films was as the special effects co-ordinator for Stanley Kubrick's 2001: A Space Odyssey (1968).

He died 22 December 1979, aged 72, in Thanet in Kent.

== Filmography ==
- Stranger in Town (1957)
- Rooney (1958)
- Sally's Irish Rogue (1958)
- Don't Panic Chaps! (1959)
- Broth of a Boy (1959)
- And the Same to You (1960)
- Murder She Said (1961)
- Village of Daughters (1962)
- Kill or Cure (1962)
- Murder at the Gallop (1963)
- Murder Most Foul (1964)
- Murder Ahoy (1964)
- Ten Little Indians (1965)
