= Margaret Rutherford =

English actress (1892–1972)

Dame Margaret Rutherford DBE
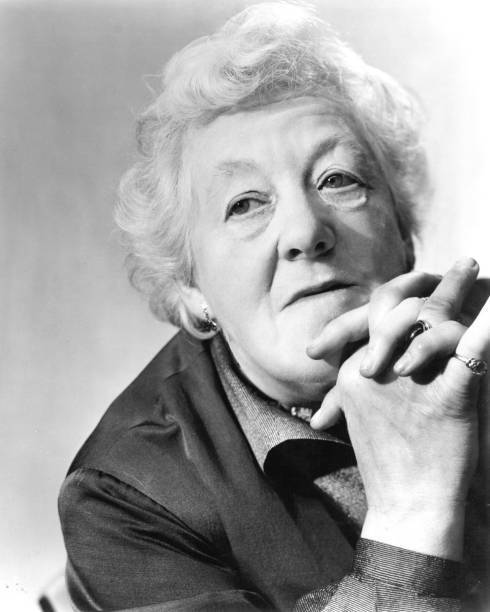
- Rutherford c. 1960
- Born: Margaret Taylor Rutherford; 11 May 1892; Balham, London, England
- Died: 22 May 1972 (aged 80); Chalfont St. Peter, Buckinghamshire, England
- Resting place: St. James's Church, Gerrards Cross, Buckinghamshire, England
- Occupation: Actress
- Years active: 1925–1967
- Spouse: Stringer Davis (m. 1945)
- Parent(s): William Rutherford Benn; Florence Nicholson
- Relatives: Sir John Benn, 1st Baronet (uncle)

Dame Margaret Taylor Rutherford (11 May 1892 – 22 May 1972) was an English actress of stage, films and television.

Rutherford came to national attention following the Second World War in the film adaptations of Noël Coward's Blithe Spirit, and Oscar Wilde's The Importance of Being Earnest. In 1948 she was awarded a Special Tony Award for Outstanding Foreign Company as a cast member of The Importance of Being Earnest, and she later won an Academy Award for Best Supporting Actress and a Golden Globe Award for Best Supporting Actress – Motion Picture for her role as the Duchess of Brighton in The V.I.P.s (1963). In the early 1960s she starred as Agatha Christie's character Miss Marple in a series of four George Pollock films. She was appointed an Officer of the Order of the British Empire (OBE) in 1961 and a Dame Commander (DBE) in 1967.

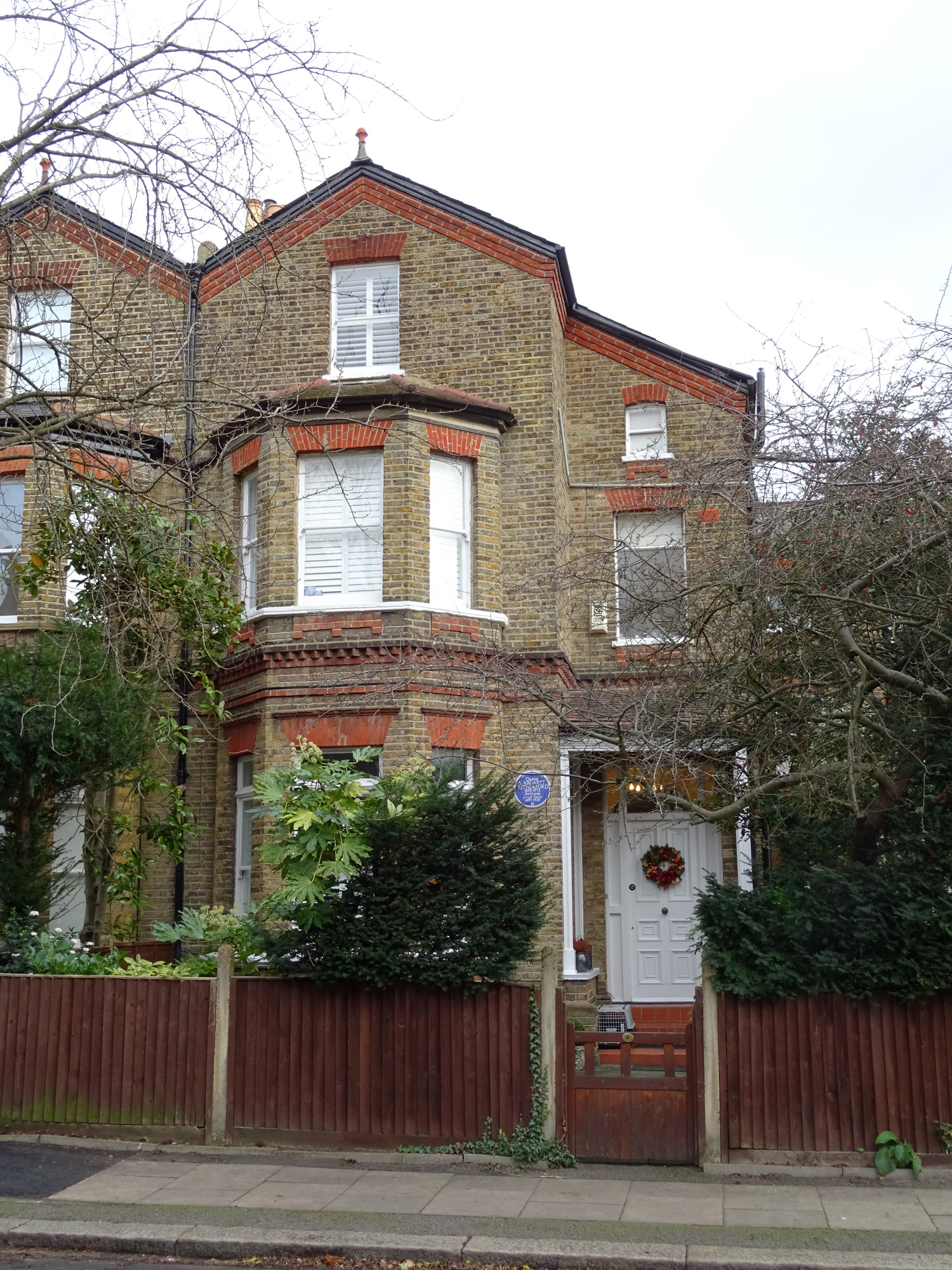
Rutherford's early home, her aunt Bessie's house in Wimbledon, 1895–1920

== Early life and education ==
Rutherford's early life was overshadowed by tragedies involving both of her parents. Her father, journalist and poet William Rutherford Benn, married Florence Nicholson on 16 December 1882 in Wandsworth, South London. One month after the marriage he suffered a nervous breakdown and was admitted to Bethnal House Lunatic Asylum. Released to travel under his family's supervision, he murdered his father, the Reverend Julius Benn, a Congregational Church minister, by bludgeoning him to death with a chamber pot, before cutting his own throat with a pocket knife at an inn in Matlock, Derbyshire, on 4 March 1883.

Following the inquest, William Benn was certified insane and removed to Broadmoor Criminal Lunatic Asylum. Seven years later, on 26 July 1890, he was discharged from Broadmoor and reunited with his wife. He legally dropped his surname.

Margaret Taylor Rutherford, the only child of William and Florence, was born in 1892 in Balham, South London. Margaret's uncle, Sir John Benn, 1st Baronet, was a politician, and her first cousin once removed was the Labour politician Tony Benn. Hoping to start a new life far from the scene of their recent troubles, the Rutherfords emigrated to Madras, India, but Margaret was sent back to Britain when she was three years old to live with her aunt Bessie Nicholson in Wimbledon, South London, after her pregnant mother hanged herself from a tree.

Young Margaret had been told that her father died of a broken heart soon afterwards. When she was 12 years old, however, she was shocked to learn that her father had actually been readmitted to Broadmoor Hospital in 1903 and remained there until his death on 4 August 1921. Her parents' mental afflictions gave rise to a fear that she might succumb to similar maladies, a fear that haunted her for the rest of her life. She suffered intermittent bouts of depression and anxiety.

Rutherford was educated at Wimbledon High School (where there is now a theatre space named after her, the Rutherford Centre) and, from the age of 13, at Raven's Croft School, a boarding school in Sutton Avenue, Seaford. While she was there, she developed an interest in the theatre and performed in amateur dramatics. After she left school her aunt paid for her to have private acting lessons. When her aunt died she left a legacy that allowed Rutherford to secure entry to the Old Vic School. In her autobiography Rutherford called her Aunt Bessie her "adoptive mother and one of the saints of the world".

== Acting career ==
=== Stage ===
Rutherford, a talented pianist, first found work as a piano teacher and a teacher of elocution. She developed an acting career relatively late, making her stage debut only in 1925, aged 33, at the Old Vic. As her "spaniel jowls" and bulky frame made being cast in romantic heroine roles impossible, she established her name in comedy, appearing in many of the most successful British plays and films. "I never intended to play for laughs. I am always surprised that the audience thinks me funny at all", Rutherford wrote in her autobiography. Rutherford made her first appearance in London's West End in 1933, but her talent was not recognised by the critics until her performance as Miss Prism in John Gielgud's production of The Importance of Being Earnest at the Globe Theatre in 1939.

In 1941 Noël Coward's Blithe Spirit opened on the London stage at the Piccadilly Theatre, with Coward directing. Rutherford received rave reviews from audiences and critics alike for her lusty portrayal of the bumbling medium Madame Arcati, a role for which Coward had envisioned her. Theatre critic Kenneth Tynan once said of her performances: "The unique thing about Margaret Rutherford is that she can act with her chin alone."

Another theatrical success during the war years included her part as the sinister housekeeper Mrs. Danvers in Daphne du Maurier's Rebecca at the Queen's Theatre in 1940. Her post-war theatre credits included Miss Prism in The Importance of Being Earnest again at the Haymarket Theatre in 1946 and Lady Bracknell when the same play transferred to New York City in 1947. She played an officious headmistress in The Happiest Days of Your Life at the Apollo Theatre in 1948 and classical roles such as Madame Desmortes in Ring Round the Moon at the Globe Theatre, 1950, Lady Wishfort in The Way of the World at Lyric Hammersmith, 1953 and Saville Theatres, in 1956, and Mrs. Candour in The School for Scandal at the Haymarket Theatre in 1962. Her final stage performance came in 1966 when she played Mrs. Malaprop in The Rivals at the Haymarket Theatre, alongside Sir Ralph Richardson. Her declining health meant she had to give up the role.

=== Film ===
Although she made her film debut in 1936, it was Rutherford's turn as Madame Arcati in David Lean's film of Blithe Spirit (1945) that established her in films. Her jaunty performance, cycling about the Kent countryside, head held high, back straight, and cape fluttering behind her, established the model for portraying that role thereafter. She was Nurse Carey in Miranda (1948) and the sprightly Medieval expert Professor Hatton-Jones in Passport to Pimlico (1949), one of the Ealing Comedies. She reprised her stage roles of the headmistress alongside Alastair Sim in The Happiest Days of Your Life (1950) and Miss Prism in Anthony Asquith's film adaptation of The Importance of Being Earnest (1952).

More comedies followed, including Castle in the Air (1952) with David Tomlinson, Trouble in Store (1953), with Norman Wisdom, The Runaway Bus (1954) with Frankie Howerd and An Alligator Named Daisy (1955) with Donald Sinden and Diana Dors. Rutherford worked with Norman Wisdom again in Just My Luck (1957) and co-starred in The Smallest Show on Earth with Virginia McKenna, Peter Sellers and Leslie Phillips (both 1957). She starred alongside Ian Carmichael and Peter Sellers, in the Boulting Brothers satire I'm All Right Jack (1959).

In the early 1960s, she appeared as Miss Jane Marple in a series of four George Pollock films loosely based on novels by Agatha Christie. The films depicted Marple as a colourful character, respectable but bossy and eccentric. Authors Marion Shaw and Sabine Vanacker in their book Reflecting on Miss Marple (1991) complained that the emphasis on the "dotty element in the character" missed entirely "the quietness and sharpness" so admired in the novels. The actress, then aged in her 70s, insisted on wearing her own clothes for the parts and having her husband appear alongside her. In 1963 Christie dedicated her novel The Mirror Crack'd from Side to Side "To Margaret Rutherford in admiration", though the novelist was critical of the films for diverging from her original plots and playing dramatic scenes for laughs. Rutherford reprised the role of Miss Marple in a very brief, uncredited cameo in the 1965 film The Alphabet Murders.

Rutherford played the absent-minded, impoverished, pill-popping Duchess of Brighton – the only comedy relief – in The V.I.P.s (1963) from a screenplay by Terence Rattigan. The film features a star-studded cast led by Maggie Smith, Elizabeth Taylor and Richard Burton. For her performance, she won an Academy Award and Golden Globe Awards for Best Supporting Actress. At the time she set a record for the oldest woman and last born in the nineteenth century to win an Oscar.

She appeared as Mistress Quickly in Orson Welles' film Chimes at Midnight (1965) and was directed by Charlie Chaplin in A Countess from Hong Kong (1967), starring Marlon Brando and Sophia Loren, which was one of her final films. She started work on The Virgin and the Gypsy (1970), but illness caused her to be replaced by Fay Compton.

== Personal life, illness, death and legacy ==
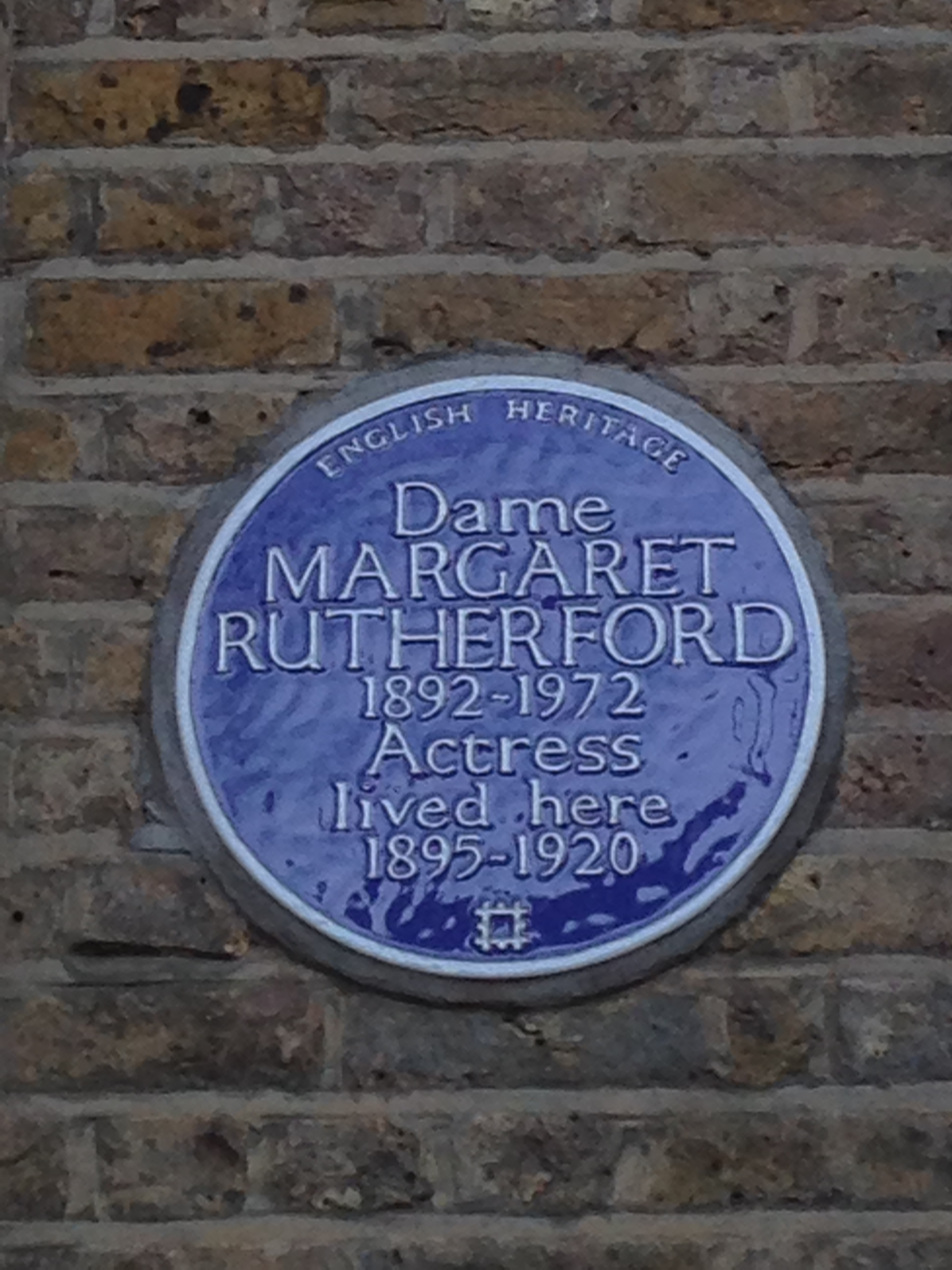
English Heritage Blue plaque at former home, Wimbledon

In 1945, Rutherford, 53, married character actor Stringer Davis, 46, after a courtship that lasted 15 years. Davis' mother reportedly considered Rutherford an unsuitable match for her son, and their wedding was postponed until after Mrs. Davis had died. Subsequently, the couple appeared in many productions together. Davis adored Rutherford, with one friend noting: "For him she was not only a great talent but, above all, a beauty." The actor and former serviceman rarely left his wife's side, serving Rutherford as private secretary. He also nursed and comforted her through periodic debilitating depression. These illnesses, sometimes involving stays in mental hospitals and electric shock treatment, were kept hidden from the press during Rutherford's lifetime.

In the 1950s, Rutherford and Davis unofficially adopted writer Gordon Langley Hall (later Dawn Langley Simmons), then in her twenties, who later wrote a biography of Rutherford in 1983.

Rutherford suffered from Alzheimer's disease at the end of her life and was unable to work. Davis cared for his wife at their Buckinghamshire home until her death on 22 May 1972, aged 80. Many of Britain's top actors, including John Gielgud, Ralph Richardson, Flora Robson, and Joyce Grenfell, attended a memorial Service of Thanksgiving at the Actors' Church, St. Paul's, Covent Garden, on 21 July 1972, where 90-year-old Sybil Thorndike praised her friend's enormous talent and recalled that Rutherford had "never said anything horrid about anyone".

Rutherford and Davis (who died in 1973) are interred at the graveyard of St. James's Church, Gerrards Cross, Buckinghamshire. "A Blithe Spirit" is inscribed on the base of Margaret Rutherford's memorial stone, a reference to the Noël Coward play that helped to make her name. The cottage they shared in Chalfont St Peter was demolished after Rutherford’s death; a residential care home built on the site was named Rutherford House, Marple Lane, in her honour.

== Performances and works ==
=== Film ===
| Year | Title | Role | Notes |
|---|---|---|---|
| 1936 | Troubled Waters | Bit role | film debut, uncredited |
| 1936 | Dusty Ermine | Evelyn Summers aka Miss Butterby | |
| 1936 | Talk of the Devil | Housekeeper | |
| 1937 | Beauty and the Barge | Mrs. Baldwin | |
| 1937 | Big Fella | Nanny | uncredited |
| 1937 | Catch as Catch Can | Maggie Carberry | |
| 1937 | Missing, Believed Married | Lady Parke | |
| 1941 | Spring Meeting | Aunt Bijou | |
| 1941 | Quiet Wedding | Magistrate | |
| 1943 | Yellow Canary | Mrs. Towcester | |
| 1943 | The Demi-Paradise | Rowena Ventnor | |
| 1944 | English Without Tears | Lady Christabel Beauclerk | |
| 1945 | Blithe Spirit | Madame Arcati | |
| 1947 | While the Sun Shines | Dr Winifred Frye | |
| 1947 | Meet Me at Dawn | Madame Vernore | |
| 1948 | Miranda | Nurse Carey | |
| 1949 | Passport to Pimlico | Professor Hatton-Jones | |
| 1950 | The Happiest Days of Your Life | Muriel Whitchurch | |
| 1950 | Her Favourite Husband | Mrs. Dotherington | |
| 1951 | The Magic Box | Lady Pond | |
| 1952 | Curtain Up | Catherine Beckwith / Jeremy St. Claire | |
| 1952 | The Importance of Being Earnest | Miss Letitia Prism | |
| 1952 | Castle in the Air | Miss Nicholson | |
| 1952 | Miss Robin Hood | Miss Honey | |
| 1953 | Innocents in Paris | Gwladys Inglott | |
| 1953 | Trouble in Store | Miss Bacon | |
| 1954 | The Runaway Bus | Miss Cynthia Beeston | |
| 1954 | Mad About Men | Nurse Carey | |
| 1954 | Aunt Clara | Clara Hilton | |
| 1955 | An Alligator Named Daisy | Prudence Croquet | |
| 1957 | The Smallest Show on Earth | Mrs. Fazackalee | |
| 1957 | Just My Luck | Mrs. Dooley | |
| 1959 | I'm All Right Jack | Aunt Dolly | |
| 1961 | On the Double | Lady Vivian | |
| 1961 | Murder She Said | Miss Marple | |
| 1962 | Zero One (TV) | Mrs Pendenny | episode "The Liar" |
| 1963 | The Mouse on the Moon | Grand Duchess Gloriana XIII | |
| 1963 | Murder at the Gallop | Miss Marple | |
| 1963 | The V.I.P.s | The Duchess of Brighton | Academy Award for Best Supporting Actress; Golden Globe Award for Best Supporting Actress – Motion Picture; Laurel Award for Top Female Supporting Performance; National Board of Review Award for Best Supporting Actress |
| 1964 | Murder Most Foul | Miss Marple | |
| 1964 | Murder Ahoy! | Miss Marple | |
| 1965 | Chimes at Midnight | Mistress Quickly | |
| 1965 | The Alphabet Murders | Miss Marple | uncredited cameo |
| 1967 | A Countess from Hong Kong | Miss Gaulswallow | |
| 1967 | Arabella | Princess Ilaria | |
| 1967 | The Wacky World of Mother Goose | Mother Goose | voice |

=== Theatre ===
- A student at the Old Vic Theatre School, playing walk-ons and small parts in various shows, 1925–26
- Understudy for Mabel Terry-Lewis at the Lyric Theatre, Hammersmith, 1928
- A season with the English Repertory Players at the Grand Theatre, Fulham, 1929
- Little Theatre, Epsom, 1930
- A season in rep at the Oxford Playhouse, 1930–31
- A season in rep in Croydon, 1931
- A season with the Greater London Players, 1932
- Mrs. Read in Wild Justice at the Lyric Theatre, Hammersmith, 1933
- Birthday (understudy to Jean Cadell and Muriel Aked), at the Cambridge Theatre, 1934
- Aline Solness in The Master Builder at the Embassy Theatre, Swiss Cottage, 1934
- Lady Nancy in Hervey House at His Majesty's Theatre, 1935
- Miss Flower in Short Story at the Queen's Theatre, 1935
- Mrs. Palmai in Farewell Performance at the Lyric Theatre, Hammersmith, 1936
- Aunt Bella in Tavern in the Town at the Embassy Theatre, Swiss Cottage, 1937
- Emily Deveral in Up the Garden Path at the Embassy Theatre, Swiss Cottage, 1937
- The Mother in The Melody That Got Lost at the Phoenix Theatre, 1938
- Bijou Furze in Spring Meeting at the Ambassadors Theatre, 1938
- Miss Prism in The Importance of Being Earnest at the Globe Theatre, 1939
- Mrs. Danvers in Rebecca at the Queen's Theatre, 1940
- Madame Arcati in Blithe Spirit at the Piccadilly Theatre, 1941
- ENSA tour of France and Belgium, 1944
- Queen of Hearts and White Queen in Alice in Wonderland at the Palace Theatre, 1944
- Lady Charlotte Fayre in Perchance to Dream at the London Hippodrome, 1945
- Miss Prism in The Importance of Being Earnest at the Theatre Royal Haymarket, 1946
- Lady Bracknell in The Importance of Being Earnest at the Royale Theatre, New York, 1947
- Evelyn Whitchurch in The Happiest Days of Your Life at the Apollo Theatre, 1948
- Madame Desmortes in Ring Round the Moon at the Globe Theatre, 1950
- The title role in Miss Hargreaves at the Royal Court Theatre and New Theatre, 1952
- Lady Wishfort in The Way of the World at the Lyric Theatre, Hammersmith, 1953
- White Queen in Alice Through the Looking-Glass at the Prince's Theatre, 1954
- Duchess of Pont-au-Bronc in Time Remembered at the Lyric Theatre, Hammersmith and New Theatre, 1954
- Mirabelle Petersham in A Likely Tale at the Globe Theatre, 1956
- Lady Wishfort in The Way of the World at the Saville Theatre, 1956
- Lady Bracknell in The Importance of Being Earnest on Ireland and UK tour (Dublin, Limerick, Belfast, Edinburgh, Leeds, Liverpool, Eastbourne and Bournemouth), 1957
- The Happiest Days of Your Life and Time Remembered on tour of Australia, 1957
- Minerva Goody (Povis) in Farewell, Farewell Eugene at the Garrick Theatre, 1959
- Minerva Goody (Povis) in Farewell, Farewell Eugene at the Helen Hayes Theatre, New York, 1960
- Bijou Furze in Dazzling Prospect at the Globe Theatre, 1961
- The Marquise in Our Little Life at the Manoel Theatre in Valletta, Malta and the Pembroke Theatre, Croydon, 1961
- Mrs. Candour in The School for Scandal at the Theatre Royal Haymarket, 1962
- Mrs. Laura Partridge in The Solid Gold Cadillac at the Saville Theatre, 1965
- Mrs. Heidelberg in The Clandestine Marriage at the Chichester Festival Theatre, 1966
- Mrs. Malaprop in The Rivals at the Theatre Royal Haymarket, 1966

=== Recordings ===
The English PEN International Centre included several readings of poems by Rutherford on a list entitled Library of Recordings.pdf (1953). The works listed were:

- "A Charm Against the Toothache" by John Heath-Stubbs
- "O Country People" by John Hewett
- "Sedge-Warblers", "Women He Liked", "Haymaking", "Adlestrop", "Will You Come?" and "Lights Out" by Edward Thomas

==== 78s and singles ====
- "All's Going Well" / "Nymphs and Shepherds" (1953) (with Frankie Howerd): Philips Records PB214

== See also ==
- List of British actors
- List of Academy Award winners and nominees from Great Britain
- List of actors with Academy Award nominations
- List of Golden Globe winners
