= The V.I.P.s (film) =

1963 British film by Anthony Asquith

- Original film poster.
- Directed by: Anthony Asquith
- Written by: Terence Rattigan
- Produced by: Anatole de Grunwald
- Starring: Elizabeth Taylor; Richard Burton; Louis Jourdan; Elsa Martinelli; Margaret Rutherford; Maggie Smith; Rod Taylor; Orson Welles
- Cinematography: Jack Hildyard
- Edited by: Frank Clarke
- Music by: Miklós Rózsa
- Production company: De Grunwald Productions
- Distributed by: Metro-Goldwyn-Mayer
- Release dates: 2 September 1963 (Manila); 4 September 1963 (London)
- Running time: 119 minutes
- Country: United Kingdom
- Language: English
- Budget: $4 million or £1,071,314
- Box office: $15 million (US/Canada)

The V.I.P.s (also known as Hotel International) is a 1963 British comedy-drama film in Metrocolor and Panavision. It was directed by Anthony Asquith, produced by Anatole de Grunwald, and distributed by Metro-Goldwyn-Mayer. The film was written by Terence Rattigan, with a music score by Miklós Rózsa.

It has an all-star cast, including Richard Burton, Elizabeth Taylor, Louis Jourdan, Elsa Martinelli, Maggie Smith, Rod Taylor, Orson Welles, and Margaret Rutherford, who won the Academy Award for Best Supporting Actress as well as the Golden Globe Award for Best Supporting Actress – Motion Picture. The costumes are by Pierre Cardin.

== Plot ==
The film is set within Terminal 3 of London Heathrow Airport during a fog. As flights are delayed, the VIPs (very important people) of the title play out the drama of their lives in a number of slightly interconnected stories. The delays have caused serious hardship for most of the characters and have plunged some of them into a deep personal or financial crisis.

The central story concerns famed actress Frances Andros trying to leave her husband, millionaire Paul Andros, and fly away with her suitor Marc Champselle. Because of the fog, Andros has the opportunity to come to the airport to persuade his wife not to leave him.

The Duchess of Brighton is on her way to Florida to take a job, which will pay her enough money to save her historic home. Meanwhile, film producer Max Buda needs to leave London, taking his newest protégée Gloria Gritti with him, by midnight if he is to avoid paying a hefty tax bill.

Les Mangrum, an Australian businessman, must get to New York City to prevent his business from being sold. His dutiful secretary, Miss Mead, is secretly in love with him. It being a matter of great urgency, she decides to approach Paul Andros and ask him to advance a sum of money that will save Mangrum's company.

Buda spots a poster picturing the Duchess's home. She is offered a sum of money if she will permit Buda to use it as a location in a film, enough to keep the house she loves. Andros, meanwhile, about to lose the woman he loves, is spared a possible suicide at the last minute when he and his wife reconcile.

== Cast ==
- Elizabeth Taylor as Frances Andros
- Richard Burton as Paul Andros
- Louis Jourdan as Marc Champselle
- Elsa Martinelli as Gloria Gritti
- Margaret Rutherford as The Duchess of Brighton
- Maggie Smith as Miss Mead
- Rod Taylor as Les Mangrum
- Orson Welles as Max Buda
- Linda Christian as Miriam Marshall
- Dennis Price as Commander Millbank
- Richard Wattis as Sanders
- David Frost as Reporter
- Ronald Fraser as Joslin
- Robert Coote as John Coburn
- Michael Hordern as Airport Director
- Martin Miller as Dr. Schwalbacher
- Lance Percival as B.O.A.C. Official
- Joan Benham as Miss Potter
- Peter Sallis as Doctor
- Stringer Davis as Hotel Waiter
- Clifton Jones as Jamaican Passenger
- Moyra Fraser as Air Hostess

Uncredited Cast

- Duncan Lewis as Hotel Receptionist
- Raymond Austin as Rolls-Royce Chauffeur
- Cal McCord as Visitor
- Virginia Bedard as Knebworth House visitor
- Jill Carson as Air Hostess
- Ann Castle as Lady Reporter
- Rosemary Dorken as Airport Announcer
- Betty Trapp as Waitress
- Maggie McGrath as Waitress
- Lewis Fiander as Third Reporter
- John Blythe as Barman
- Richard Briers as Meteorological Official
- Richard Caldicot as Hotel Representative
- Reginald Beckwith as Head Waiter
- Terence Alexander as Captain
- Frank Williams as Assistant to Airport Director
- Clifford Mollison as Mr. River the Hotel Manager
- Gordon Sterne as Official
- Joyce Carey as Mrs. Damer
- Angus Lennie as Meteorological Man
- Peter Illing as Mr. Damer

== Production ==
=== Script ===
According to a biography of Rattigan, the idea of the film originated with the writer's experience of a flight delay due to fog at London Airport; and one of the story lines is drawn from the true story of actress Vivien Leigh's attempt to leave her husband, actor Laurence Olivier, for the actor Peter Finch, but Leigh got trapped in the VIP lounge at Heathrow due to fog.

=== Casting ===
Asquith intended for Sophia Loren to play Taylor's role, remembering the box-office success of The Millionairess (1960) he did with Loren in the main role. However, Taylor, scared by the appeal Loren had for Burton, persuaded Asquith to hire her instead; "Let Sophia stay in Rome", she told him. Taylor's fee was $1 million (£357,143).

This was the first time Australian actor Rod Taylor had played an Australian character on film. Terence Rattigan allowed him to Australian-ise some of the dialogue. Stringer Davis, Rutherford's husband, appears in a tiny role as a sympathetic hotel waiter in a scene with her. Raymond Austin, a stuntman and a friend of Burton, appears in the film as Andros's driver. Television personality David Frost portrays a reporter interviewing the VIPs at the airport.

=== Filming ===
The film was shot entirely at MGM-British Studios, Borehamwood, Herts., with a few establishing shots filmed at what was then known as London Airport, later Heathrow. The terminal set was one of the largest ever constructed in the UK.

== Release ==
The film had a dual theatre premiere in Manila in the Philippines on 2 September 1963.

The film opened 4 September 1963 at the Empire, Leicester Square in London and in other towns and cities in the UK the following day. It opened 13 September 1963 at the Paramount Theatre in Hollywood and on 19 September 1963 at Radio City Music Hall in New York City.

== Reception ==
=== Box office ===
Critical reaction to the film was mixed. It nevertheless did extremely well at the box office, helped by the enormous publicity attached to Burton and Taylor's Cleopatra, which was out on release.

In its first week at the Empire Leicester Square, it grossed a house record $30,114. It also set house records in most cinemas in the UK outside London in its first week. In its first week of release, before it had opened in the United States, it had grossed $1,337,000 from 172 theatres in 89 cities of 30 countries.

The film was one of the 12 most popular films in Britain in 1963. In the United States and Canada, it grossed $15 million, earning $7.5 million in U.S. theatrical rentals on a budget of $4 million. It had admissions of 765,804 in France.

=== Critical ===
Alexander Walker of London's Evening Standard was critical of the film, and said: "It is an entire British museum of prehistoric cliches and burial mound characters."

Bosley Crowther of The New York Times praised The V.I.P.s as "a lively, engrossing romantic film cut to the always serviceable pattern of the old multi-character Grand Hotel, and some of the other people in it are even more exciting than the top two stars. Louis Jourdan, for instance." Variety called it "a smooth and cunning brew with most of the ingredients demanded of popular screen entertainment. It has suspense, conflict, romance, comedy and drama ... Its main fault is that some of the characters and by-plots are not developed enough though they and their problems are interesting enough to warrant separate pix. But that is a risk inevitable in any film in which a number of strangers are flung together, each with problems and linked by single circumstance."

Philip K. Scheuer of the Los Angeles Times wrote: "They can say it's in the tradition of MGM's Grand Hotel and Dinner at Eight all they want; to me it's a grounded High and Mighty. And I do mean grounded—not only at London airport, but in the writing, directing, and some of the acting as well."

Richard L. Coe of The Washington Post called it "very good fun—sleek, adroit and enjoyable." The Monthly Film Bulletin wrote: "The V.I.P.s is a pretty little cinematic souffle that melts in the mind, but its flavour is spicy and sweet."

The team of Asquith, De Grunwald and Rattigan later produced another portmanteau film, the dramatic The Yellow Rolls-Royce (1964). Robert Murphy disapproved of both films, remarking that "Asquith spent his last years making increasingly banal prestige productions like The V.I.P.s and The Yellow Rolls-Royce".

=== Accolades ===
Award	Category	Nominee(s)	Result	Ref.
Academy Awards	Best Supporting Actress	Margaret Rutherford	Won	
British Academy Film Awards	Best Cinematography – Colour	Jack Hildyard	Nominated	
Golden Globe Awards	Best Supporting Actress – Motion Picture	Margaret Rutherford	Won	
Golden Globe Awards	Most Promising Newcomer – Female	Maggie Smith	Nominated	
Laurel Awards	Top Female Supporting Performance	Margaret Rutherford	Won	
National Board of Review Awards	Best Supporting Actress	Margaret Rutherford	Won	

== Novelisation ==
Slightly ahead of the film's release, as was the custom of the era, a paperback novelisation of the screenplay was published by Dell Books. The author was renowned crime and western novelist Marvin H. Albert, who also made something of a cottage industry out of movie tie-ins. He seems to have been the most prolific screenplay noveliser of the late '50s through mid '60s, and, during that time, the preeminent specialist at light comedy, though he adapted a few drama scripts as well. The V.I.P.s is what's known as an "inferred novelization" because, although screenwriter Terence Rattigan is not given attribution anywhere on or in the book, the copyright is assigned to Metro-Goldwyn-Mayer. Whether this omission was an editorial error, or a marketing ploy to make Albert's novel seem to be the film's source material (with or without the complicity of Rattigan), is unknown.

== In popular culture ==
The film's theme music was used as the intro to the Flemish children's television series Johan en de Alverman.

== See also ==
- 1963 in film
- List of British films of 1963
- List of drama films
