= Murder Ahoy! =

1964 British film by George Pollock

- Theatrical release poster by Tom Jung
- Directed by: George Pollock
- Written by: Agatha Christie (motifs)
- Screenplay by: David Pursall; Jack Seddon
- Starring: Margaret Rutherford; Lionel Jeffries; Stringer Davis
- Cinematography: Desmond Dickinson
- Edited by: Ernest Walter
- Music by: Ron Goodwin
- Distributed by: Metro-Goldwyn-Mayer
- Release dates: 3 October 1965 (UK); 22 September 1964 (USA)
- Running time: 93 minutes
- Country: United Kingdom
- Language: English

Murder Ahoy! is a 1964 British film directed by George Pollock. This was the fourth, and final, film in a series featuring Margaret Rutherford playing Miss Jane Marple for MGM between 1961-1964. Along with the previous three films Murder, She Said (1961), Murder at the Gallop (1963), Murder Most Foul (1964), Rutherford's supporting cast included Charles 'Bud' Tingwell as (Chief) Inspector Craddock and Stringer Davis (Rutherford's husband) as Mr Stringer. It was produced by Metro-Goldwyn-Mayer and the film score was by Ron Goodwin. Shooting locations included Denham Village and St Mawes, Cornwall.

Unlike the previous three films, which were adapted from Christie novels, this film used an mostly original screenplay by David Pursall and Jack Seddon, which used elements from Agatha Christie's 1952 novel They Do It With Mirrors.

== Plot ==
An old wooden-walled warship, HMS "Battledore", has been purchased by a trust for the rehabilitation of young criminals. Shortly after joining the board of the trust, Miss Marple witnesses the sudden death of a fellow trustee, who has just returned from a surprise visit to the ship, much disturbed by something he saw there. He dies without revealing his discovery. Miss Marple obtains a sample of his snuff, which is found to have been poisoned.

Resolving to learn what the trustee discovered, she visits the ship, while her confidant Jim Stringer investigates on shore. Captain Rhumstone takes an immediate dislike to her, and makes a sarcastic comment to First Mate Breeze-Connington. His distress intensifies when she decides to remain on board several days, and to sleep in the captain's quarters, obliging him to move into the first mate's cabin.

That night Miss Marple signals to Stringer to request that he tail the sailors who just went ashore. Stringer finds that they are robbing houses, and takes their dinghy to row to the ship and inform Miss Marple. Lieutenant Compton overhears their conversation and is heading down to tell the Captain when he is murdered with a sword and then hanged from a mast. As the police investigation proceeds, the assistant matron is killed, apparently by an injection of poison. The investigation interferes with the ship's traditional celebration of Trafalgar Day. The captain blames Miss Marple, and begs Chief Inspector Craddock to find a way to get her off the ship.

Miss Marple sets a trap. First, she persuades Craddock to allow the crew to go ashore for their Trafalgar Day celebration. Then, she announces to the crew that she knows that the poison was administered using a mousetrap as a booby-trap, and she hints that she soon will reveal the murderer's identity. With the crew ashore, Craddock and his assistant Sergeant Bacon hide in the ship to watch for the murderer. As Miss Marple snoops around, she encounters Lieutenant Commander Dimchurch skulking about. He says he stayed behind due to seasickness.

Miss Marple searches the ship for the loaded mousetrap, cautiously using a sword to poke into possible hiding places. She finds the mousetrap concealed in the barrel of a cannon, and with it, a large sum of money. Breeze-Connington, armed with his sword, confronts her. In response to her questioning, he informs her that he has embezzled the money gradually during his many years on the Battledore – money he considers his because he was unjustly passed over for promotion while serving in the Royal Navy. He acknowledges having committed the three preceding murders to avoid being exposed, and adds that he intends to kill her on the spot, take the money, and flee the country.

Miss Marple calls out to Craddock to make the arrest, but Craddock and Bacon have been accidentally locked in their hiding place and cannot help. Breeze-Connington draws his sword, intending to run Miss Marple through, but Marple is herself an accomplished amateur fencer. She and Breeze-Connington engage in a ferocious sword-fight. Breeze-Connington succeeds in disarming her and is about to administer the coup de grace, but Stringer, whom Miss Marple had thought was ashore, clubs him with a belaying pin.

The Captain faces a court martial for failing to detect the embezzlement under his command. As he enters the state-room to hear the verdict, he sees his sword on the table with the hilt toward him, and mistakenly infers that he has been found guilty. Miss Marple corrects him; the board has found that he is not at fault. Although greatly relieved to have avoided disgrace, he announces that he must resign even so, because he has been having a long affair with the ship's matron. They now intend to get married, which would disqualify him for his position as Captain. He turns to go, but the trustees allow him to continue as captain. He and the matron embrace joyfully. As Miss Marple leaves the, the matron and the captain wave good-bye.

== Cast ==
- Margaret Rutherford – Miss Jane Marple
- Lionel Jeffries – Captain Sydney De Courcy Rhumstone
- Charles Tingwell – Chief Inspector Craddock
- William Mervyn – Commander Breeze-Connington
- Joan Benham – Matron Alice Fanbraid
- Stringer Davis – Mr Jim Stringer
- Nicholas Parsons – Dr Crump
- Miles Malleson – Bishop Faulkner
- Henry Oscar – Lord Rudkin
- Derek Nimmo – Sub-Lieutenant Eric Humbert
- Gerald Cross – Lieutenant Commander Dimchurch (listed in end credits as "Brewer") (Cross previously starred in Rutherford’s first appearance as Miss Marple, Murder, She Said (1961), as Albert Ackenthorpe)
- Norma Foster – Assistant Matron Shirley Boston
- Terence Edmond – Sergeant Bacon
- Francis Matthews – Lieutenant Compton
- Lucy Griffiths – Millie
- Bernard Adams – Dusty Miller
- Tony Quinn – Kelly (tramp)
- Edna Petrie – Miss Pringle
- Bill Dean – Police Constable (uncredited)
- Roy Holder – Petty Officer Lamb (uncredited)
- Henry B. Longhurst – Cecil Ffolly-Hardwicke (uncredited)
- Desmond Roberts – Sir Geoffrey Bucknose (uncredited)
- Ivor Salter – Police Sergeant (uncredited)
- Arnold Schulkes – Officer (uncredited)
- Paddy Smith – Steward (uncredited)
