= The Alphabet Murders =

1965 British film by Frank Tashlin

- Theatrical release poster
- Directed by: Frank Tashlin
- Screenplay by: David Pursall; Jack Seddon
- Based on: The A.B.C. Murders; 1936 novel by Agatha Christie
- Produced by: Lawrence P. Bachmann
- Starring: Tony Randall; Anita Ekberg; Robert Morley
- Cinematography: Desmond Dickinson
- Edited by: John Victor Smith
- Music by: Ron Goodwin
- Production company: MGM-British Studios
- Distributed by: Metro-Goldwyn-Mayer
- Release dates: August 1965 (UK); 17 May 1966 (U.S.)
- Running time: 90 minutes
- Country: United Kingdom
- Language: English

The Alphabet Murders (also known as ABC Murders) is a 1965 British detective film directed by Frank Tashlin and starring Tony Randall, Anita Ekberg and Robert Morley. It is based on the 1936 novel The A.B.C. Murders by Agatha Christie.

== Plot ==
Tony Randall begins the movie by talking directly to the audience. He explains that he will be starring as the Belgian detective Hercule Poirot in a mystery set in London. As the movie begins, Poirot has arrived in London to see his tailor. There, he learns that a circus clown with a unique diving act has been murdered (with a poison dart), and Poirot decides to solve the case. He is joined in this endeavor by Captain Hastings from the British Secret Service, who has been assigned to protect Poirot, or at least follow him. Hastings becomes Poirot's assistant, of a sort. Soon afterwards, a voluptuous bowling instructor is killed. The clown was named Albert Aachen (A.A.), the bowling instructor was named Betty Barnard (B.B.) and both crime scenes featured a "calling card" from the killer: a book entitled "ABC Guide to London." Of course, Poirot suspects the killer is working his or her way through the alphabet.

While getting a massage, Poirot is attacked by a beautiful woman. We are left to conclude that the attack was intended to prevent the famous sleuth from solving the crimes. We learn that she carried a purse with the initials A.B.C. Later we discover that her full name is Amanda Beatrice Cross.

Poirot suggests that Sir Carmichael Clarke (C.C.) might be next. We also meet a psychiatrist named Duncan Doncaster (D.D.) who is established as a potential fourth victim. Amanda Cross is actually a patient of Dr. Duncaster's. And secretly, Dr. Duncaster was paramour to Betty Barnard, and he is also having an affair with Sir Clarke's wife, Lady Diane. Poirot learns that Amanda Cross suffers from a split personality--one of her identities is that of a normal person, while the other seems to be a homicidal maniac. Indeed, she is the beautiful woman who attacked Poirot on the massage table.

Sir Clarke goes to a night club, to confront his brother Franklin over Franklin's spendthrift and gambling behaviors. During the confrontation, Sir Clarke is shot and killed. Again with a poison dart, and again with a copy of ABC London left behind. Dr. Duncaster is next--also with the poison dart, also with a copy of ABC London. This makes four murders.

As the police and Poirot focus their attention on Amanda Cross, she apparently learns what she has done and jumps from a tall crane into the River Thames. The police close their investigation, calling it "open and shut" that Amanda Cross was a "nutcase" intent on this bizarre series of alphabetical murders, eventually committing suicide to wrap things up. Poirot is not at all convinced. Indeed a happenstance mention of herring inspires Poirot to exclaim, "Red herrings. The four murders are red herrings to distract us from the important one murder."

Franklin Clarke and the newly-widowed Mrs. Clarke set off by train to carry out Sir Clarke's wishes to be buried at sea off the coast of Scotland. Sir Clarke's coffin is on the train. When Poirot and Hastings go to Sir Clarke's house in London, it is there that they learn what Franklin and Lady Diane are doing--and in a moment of foreshadowing, they also learn that the house's central heating furnace has curiously been turned up, even though it is quite warm outside. Immediately, Poirot and Hastings book passage on the train. Poirot makes an inscrutable detour en-route to the station, to set up "some additional insurance."

In their cabin, while Lady Diane celebrates her new-found riches with Franklin, she fails to notice that he has spiked her drink. She passes out, and he drags her to the storage compartment on the train where Sir Clarke's coffin is located. At the coffin, two things happen: Poirot arrives to confront Franklin, and the coffin is opened, from within, to reveal a not-dead-at-all Amanda Cross.

Poirot unravels the mystery: Amanda and Franklin are lovers. They conspire to kill Sir Clarke and Lady Diane, so that Franklin can inherit Sir Clarke's fortune. Amanda does the dart gun killings in a manner to fool the police. The body of Sir Clarke is being burned in the furnace to turn the heat up at his house. Lady Diane was going to be put into the coffin to be buried at sea. Franklin and Amanda would then have Sir Clarke's wealth, free from suspicion.

While Poirot initially had the pair at sword-point, the two overwhelmed him, and the sword was suddenly pointed at Poirot. Would it be murder number five? Or six counting Lady Diane? No. Poirot blows a whistle to call out his "additional insurance." Police pop out of every cubbyhole, grabbing the pair by the legs, disarming them, effecting their capture, saving Lady Diane, and saving Hercule Poirot in the process. Arranging for the police to be hidden away on the train was Poirot's additional insurance.

== Cast ==
- Tony Randall as Hercule Poirot
- Anita Ekberg as Amanda
- Robert Morley as Captain Hastings
- Maurice Denham as Inspector Japp
- Guy Rolfe as Duncan Doncaster
- Sheila Allen as Lady Diane
- James Villiers as Franklin
- Julian Glover as Don Fortune
- Grazina Frame as Betty Barnard
- Clive Morton as "X"
- Cyril Luckham as Sir Carmichael Clarke
- Richard Wattis as Wolf
- David Lodge as Sergeant
- Patrick Newell as Cracknell
- Austin Trevor as Judson
- Windsor Davies as Dragbot
- Drewe Henley as Bowling Alley Attendant
- Sheila Reid as Mrs. Fortune
- Margaret Rutherford as Miss Marple
- Stringer Davis as Mr. Stringer

== Production ==
The part of Poirot had originally been intended for Zero Mostel but the film was delayed because Agatha Christie objected to the script; amongst the things she objected to was the intention to put in a bedroom scene with Hercule Poirot. The film varies significantly from the novel and emphasises comedy, the specialty of director Frank Tashlin. Poirot is given buffoonish characteristics, while still remaining a brilliant detective.

The film features uncredited cameos by Margaret Rutherford as Miss Marple and Stringer Davis as her friend Mr Stringer. The pair had previously appeared as those characters in a series of four films produced by MGM between 1961 and 1964. The film was an attempt to do for Poirot what Rutherford did with Marple.

Austin Trevor, who plays the butler Judson, had played Poirot in three British films in the early 1930s: Alibi (1931), Black Coffee (1931) and Lord Edgware Dies (1934).

The film title changed multiple times during production. Initially known as The ABC Murders after the book, it was retitled The Alphabet Murders and later to Amanda.

== Reception ==
The Monthly Film Bulletin wrote: "Depressingly unfunny comedy-thriller: though directed by Tashlin, virtually none of the misadventures encountered by Poirot during the course of his case raise even the slightest smile. Even the tangled mystery, solved by a typical Agatha Christie 'surprise', is unusually dreary."

Leonard Maltin gives the film 2 1/2 out of 4 stars, calling it an "odd adaptation" of Christie's book. Maltin goes on to say, "[T]he strange casting of Randall ... and a little too much slapstick make this more a curiosity than anything else."

TCM calls Randall's Poirot "an Inspector Clouseau-style bumbler", noting that the second instalment of the Pink Panther series had been well-received the previous year.

A. H. Weiler of The New York Times dismissed the film as "a routine run through of clichés and clues".

== See also ==
- Agatha Christie's Great Detectives Poirot and Marple, another case of Marple and Poirot coexisting in the same story
