= Murder at the Gallop =

1963 British film by George Pollock

- Theatrical release poster by Tom Jung
- Directed by: George Pollock
- Screenplay by: James P. Cavanagh
- Based on: After the Funeral; 1953 novel by Agatha Christie
- Produced by: George H. Brown; Lawrence P. Bachmann
- Starring: Margaret Rutherford; Robert Morley; Flora Robson
- Cinematography: Arthur Ibbetson
- Edited by: Bert Rule
- Music by: Ron Goodwin
- Production company: George H. Brown Productions
- Distributed by: Metro-Goldwyn-Mayer
- Release date: 24 June 1963 (NYC)
- Running time: 81 minutes
- Country: United Kingdom
- Language: English

Murder at the Gallop (1963) is the second of four Miss Marple films made by Metro-Goldwyn-Mayer. It was based on the 1953 novel After the Funeral by Agatha Christie, with Margaret Rutherford as Miss Jane Marple, Charles "Bud" Tingwell as Inspector Craddock and Stringer Davis (Rutherford's husband) as Jane Marple's friend Mr Stringer returning from the previous film.

It also stars Robert Morley and Flora Robson and was directed by George Pollock, with James P. Cavanagh credited with the adaptation. The music was by Ron Goodwin. The film's location shots included Amersham, Little Marlow and Hilfield Castle. It is a sequel to Murder, She Said and was followed by Murder Most Foul and Murder Ahoy!, all with Rutherford as Marple.

The film changes both the action and the characters. The original novel featured Hercule Poirot rather than Miss Marple, and Christie's trademark suspense is seasoned with light comedy. Miss Gilchrist from the original novel has also morphed into Miss Milchrest.

== Plot ==
While Miss Marple and Mr Stringer are soliciting donations for a charity ("The Reformed Criminals Assistance League"), they call on Mr Enderby, a rich recluse. He tumbles down the long entrance staircase, apparently the victim of a fatal heart attack. Knowing that Enderby had a pathological fear of cats, Miss Marple becomes suspicious when she finds one in the house. She also finds a piece of mud bearing the print of a riding boot, but when she goes to Inspector Craddock, he is sceptical, believing that Enderby died of natural causes.

Undeterred, Miss Marple eavesdrops when Enderby's family gather for the reading of the will. There are four beneficiaries: fourth cousin George Crossfield, niece Rosamund Shane, nephew Hector Enderby and sister Cora Lansquenet. Each receives an equal share of the estate. Cora claims that Enderby was murdered. The next day, when Miss Marple goes to see her, she finds Cora dead, stabbed in the back with a hatpin. Cora's companion of many years, timid Miss Milchrest, can provide little information.

Miss Marple begins her investigations as a guest at the Gallop Hotel run by Hector Enderby, where the other two surviving heirs and Miss Milchrest are staying. When Inspector Craddock questions them and Rosamund's spendthrift husband Michael, none of them can produce a satisfactory alibi for the time of Cora Lansquenet's death.

An attempt is made to do away with Miss Marple but is foiled by the intended victim (without her even realising it). Miss Marple then discovers that the piece of mud found in Enderby's house came from shady art dealer George Crossfield's riding boot, but her case against him is dashed when she learns that each of the heirs visited Enderby on the day he died, to ask for money. Crossfield has meanwhile found out who the murderer is, but he is locked in a stall with an excitable horse and is trampled to death.

By this point, Miss Marple suspects the identity and motive of the killer but has no definite proof. She, therefore, lays a trap, pretending to have a heart attack at a dance at the hotel while doing the twist with Mr Stringer. The police doctor places her in a room by herself, declaring it to be too dangerous to move her until morning. During the night, the murderer, Miss Milchrest impersonating Cora, makes one last attempt to silence her, but Miss Marple is ready. Milchrest's motive is revealed to be a seemingly worthless painting owned by Cora, which actually was very valuable.

Hector Enderby later proposes marriage to Miss Marple but she turns him down. When she declares her distaste for blood sports, Hector, an enthusiastic fox hunter, mutters to himself "That was a narrow escape!"

== Cast ==
- Margaret Rutherford as Miss Marple
- Stringer Davis as Mr Stringer
- Robert Morley as Hector Enderby
- Flora Robson as Miss Milchrest
- Charles Tingwell as Inspector Craddock
- Gordon Harris as Sergeant Bacon
- Robert Urquhart as George Crossfield
- Katya Douglas^{(de)} as Rosamund Shane
- James Villiers as Michael Shane, Rosamund's husband
- Noel Howlett as Mr Trundell
- Finlay Currie as Old Enderby
- Duncan Lamont as Hillman
- Kevin Stoney as Doctor Markwell
- Frank Atkinson as Hotel night porter (uncredited)
- Roger Avon as Police Photographer (uncredited)

== Notes ==
Christie is mentioned by name early in the film when Miss Marple speaks to the police inspector after the first death. Later in the film, Marple also uses the phrase, "murder most foul," a line from Hamlet which also became the title of the next movie in the series.
