= MGM-British Studios =

Former Borehamwood film studio complex

- Interactive map of the MGM-British Studios area
- Former names: Amalgamated Studios

General information
- Type: Film studios
- Location: Elstree Way, Borehamwood, Hertfordshire, United Kingdom
- Coordinates: 51.6608°N 0.2592°W
- Construction started: 1935
- Completed: 1937
- Demolished: 1970
- Owner: Amalgamated Studios Ltd (1935–1939); Rank Organisation (1939–1944); Prudential Assurance (1944); Metro-Goldwyn-Mayer (1944–1970)

Technical details
- Floor area: Over 70,000 square feet (6,500 m^{2}) on 7 stages

MGM-British was a subsidiary of Metro-Goldwyn-Mayer initially established (as MGM London Films Denham) at Denham Film Studios in 1936. It was in limbo during the Second World War; however, following the end of hostilities, a facility was acquired in Borehamwood (one of several known as Elstree Studios), which remained in use until it was closed in 1970.

== Pre-war ==
MGM London Films Denham Ltd was formed in 1936. The films produced during the initial period at Denham Film Studios were A Yank at Oxford (1938), The Citadel (1938), Goodbye, Mr. Chips (1939) and Busman's Honeymoon (US: Haunted Honeymoon, 1940). The first production head was Michael Balcon. However, he left after a single film and was replaced by Victor Saville. The subsidiary was in abeyance during the war.

Meanwhile, Amalgamated Studios Ltd constructed a large studio on the north side of Elstree Way, Borehamwood, between 1935 and 1937. A January 1937 deal for eight films to be made for the American studio Columbia Pictures soon collapsed. The company was unable to meet the cost of building work, and in February 1939 sold the facility to the Rank Organisation, which was not interested in using the studios itself, but wanted to stop John Maxwell's rival British International Pictures (BIP) from being able to compete more effectively with Rank's recently opened Pinewood Studios. During the war, the studios were leased from Rank by the Ministry of Works which used them for storage purposes.

== Post-war ==
MGM-London purchased the former Amalgamated Studios, Borehamwood, in April 1944, and changed its name to MGM British Studios Ltd in 1946. After improvements, the studio contained seven stages with over 70,000 square feet (7,000 m^{2}) of floor space. MGM's Edward, My Son (1949), with Spencer Tracy and Deborah Kerr, was the first film to be produced at the studio.

Films made at the MGM-British Studios for the parent company included Ivanhoe (1952) and The Dirty Dozen (1967). Production designer Alfred Junge's castle setting for the former was to dominate the Borehamwood skyline for some years afterwards. The facilities were hired by other companies; 20th Century Fox shot the films Anastasia (1956) and The Inn of the Sixth Happiness (1958), for which a large set of a Chinese town, complete with artificial lakes, covering some 500,000 square feet, was constructed. When Ealing Studios sold its own studios in 1956, the company moved production of their last few films to MGM-British (with their logo now reading Ealing Films rather than Ealing Studios). Lawrence Bachmann was head of British MGM in the early 1960s.

Lew Grade's ITC used it for filmed television series, including The Prisoner (1967–68). One of the last films shot there, MGM's 2001: A Space Odyssey (1968), has been cited as one of the primary causes behind the closure of the studio, owing to Stanley Kubrick's production occupying more and more of the available studio space—eventually using all of it—for almost two years.

The studio facility was in operation until 1970, one of the last productions being ITC's UFO television series. At that time, MGM made a production and distribution deal with EMI, and began to use its facility (EMI-Elstree Studios, formerly Associated British Elstree Studios) becoming MGM-EMI, an arrangement which only lasted until 1973, with MGM having a financial interest in only a few films." MGM's own Borehamwood site was cleared and redeveloped for industrial use and housing.

== Selected productions ==
- Spring in Park Lane (1948)
- Edward, My Son (1949)
- Conspirator (1949)
- Under Capricorn (1949)
- The Miniver Story (1950)
- Ivanhoe (1952)
- Knights of the Round Table (1953)
- Mogambo (1953)
- Beau Brummell (1954)
- Gentlemen Marry Brunettes (1955)
- The Adventures of Quentin Durward (1955)
- Bhowani Junction (1956)
- Anastasia (1956)
- The Man Who Never Was (1956)
- The Man in the Sky (1957)
- The Little Hut (1957)
- Fire Down Below (1957)
- Lucky Jim (1957)
- The Inn of the Sixth Happiness (1958)
- Tom Thumb (1958)
- Gideon's Day (1958)
- The Angry Hills (1959)
- The Rough and the Smooth (1959)
- Solomon and Sheba (1959)
- Beat Girl (1960)
- The Millionairess (1960)
- The World of Suzie Wong (1960)
- Village of the Damned (1960)
- Mr. Topaze (1961)
- Murder She Said (1961)
- Nine Hours to Rama (1962)
- I Thank a Fool (1962)
- The VIPs (1963)
- In the Cool of the Day (1963)
- Come Fly With Me (1963)
- Murder at the Gallop (1963)
- The Haunting (1963)
- The Americanization of Emily (1964)
- A Shot in the Dark (1964)
- Children of the Damned (1964)
- Of Human Bondage (1964)
- 633 Squadron (1964)
- The Yellow Rolls-Royce (1964)
- Young Cassidy (1964)
- The Hill (1965)
- The Liquidator (1965)
- Operation Crossbow (1965)
- Where the Spies Are (1965)
- The Dirty Dozen (1967)
- Quatermass and the Pit (1967)
- Dance of the Vampires (1967)
- Where Eagles Dare (1968)
- The Prisoner (TV, 1967–68)
- Dark of the Sun (aka, The Mercenaries, 1968)
- 2001: A Space Odyssey (1968)
- Alfred the Great (1969)
- Goodbye, Mr. Chips (1969)
- Captain Nemo and the Underwater City (1969)
- Julius Caesar (1970)
- UFO (TV, 1969–70)

== See also ==
- Category:Films shot at MGM-British Studios
- Category:Television shows shot at MGM-British Studios
