= Children of the Damned =

1964 British film by Anton M. Leader

- Theatrical release poster
- Directed by: Anton M. Leader
- Written by: John Briley
- Produced by: Ben Arbeid
- Starring: Ian Hendry; Alan Badel; Barbara Ferris; Alfred Burke
- Cinematography: David Boulton
- Edited by: Ernest Walter
- Music by: Ron Goodwin
- Distributed by: Metro-Goldwyn-Mayer
- Release date: 29 January 1964 (U.S.)
- Running time: 90 minutes
- Country: United Kingdom
- Language: English
- Box office: $1,000,000 (US/ Canada)

Children of the Damned is a 1964 British black-and-white science fiction horror film directed by Anton M. Leader, and starring Ian Hendry, Alan Badel, Barbara Ferris and Alfred Burke. It is a thematic sequel to Village of the Damned (1960) which concerns a group of children with similar psi-powers to those in the earlier film. The film enables an interpretation of the children as being a good and more pure form of human being, rather than evil and alien.

== Plot ==
Six children are identified by a team of UNESCO researchers investigating child development. The children have extraordinary powers of intellect and are all able to complete a difficult brick puzzle in exactly the same amount of time.

British psychologist Tom Lewellyn and geneticist David Neville are interested in Paul, a London boy whose mother Diana clearly hates the child and insists she was never touched by a man. This is initially dismissed as hysteria and it is implied she has loose morals. But after a while, the two men realize that all six children were born without fathers and are also capable of telepathy.

The children, from various countries – China, India, Nigeria, the Soviet Union, the United States, and the United Kingdom – are brought to London for a collective study into their advanced intelligence; however, the children escape from their embassies and gather at an abandoned church in Southwark, London. They intermittently take mental control of Paul's aunt to help them survive in the derelict church. Meanwhile, the Army and Intelligence Service debate whether or not to destroy them. The children have demonstrated the capacity for telekinesis and construct a complex machine which uses sonic waves as a defensive weapon, which kills several government officials and soldiers. But the Army realizes that they only fight back when attacked. After psychologist Tom Lewellyn makes a passionate plea, asking the group to return to their respective embassies, the children obey and murder embassy and military officials before returning to the church.

Lewellyn urges the government to treat the children fairly; however, his team of scientists observe the difference between an ordinary human blood cell and the cells of one of the children, indicating that the children are non-human, and destined to become a threat to the human species.

When authorities try to take control of the children, they are forced to protect themselves. As the situation escalates into a final showdown between the Army and the children, one of the scientists postulates that the judgment of the children being alien was incorrect, and that the children's cells are in fact human, advanced by a million years. Meanwhile, the children also imply they have arrived at the decision that their presence is incompatible with that of the comparatively primitive humans around them, and therefore they intend to lower their defences and sacrifice themselves. The military commander recognizes a mistake has been made, and aborts the attack command; however, the command is triggered accidentally by a screwdriver – one of the simplest of human tools. The church is destroyed, and the children are killed.

== Cast ==
- Ian Hendry as Col. Tom Lewellyn
- Alan Badel as Dr. David Neville
- Barbara Ferris as Susan Eliot
- Alfred Burke as Colin Webster
- Sheila Allen as Diana Looran
- Ralph Michael as defence minister
- Patrick Wymark as commander
- Martin Miller as Professor Gruber
- Harold Goldblatt as Harib
- Patrick White as Mr. Davidson
- André Mikhelson as Russian official
- Bessie Love as Mrs. Robbins, Mark's grandmother
- Alan MacNaughtan as British Army officer (uncredited)
- Clive Powell as Paul
- Roberta Rex as Nina
- Mahdu Mathen as Rashid
- Yoke-Moon Lee as Mi Ling
- Gerald Delsol as Ago
- Frank Summerscale as Mark

== Production ==
The film was made by MGM's British production arm.

== Critical reception ==
The Monthly Film Bulletin wrote: "Like most sequels, Children of the Damned is struggling to keep pace with a success. Its good ideas, such as they are, mostly come from Village of the Damned, although there is a vulgarisation in the way the children's eyes are made to glow like torch-bulbs when they are exercising their murderous talents. The last sequence introduces a highly moral note – on earth the children have been taught only violence, which they now decline to use – and the film ends on a glumly pointed close-up of the screwdriver whose accidental fall launched the fatal bombardment. This might be more telling if the ground had been better prepared, but the film allows too many of its ideas to go off half-cocked, and largely wastes the well-chosen setting of the derelict church. Anton Leader's direction, serviceable enough in a TV fashion, pulls off tolerably effective moments when the mother of one of the boys walks straight into an oncoming car, and when a policeman is made to turn his gun on his colleague."

Howard Thompson in The New York Times wrote: "a dull, pretentious successor to that marvelous little chiller of several seasons ago, Village of the Damned. What a comedown."

On Rotten Tomatoes, the film holds an approval rating of 73% based on 11 reviews, with a weighted average rating of 5.5/10. Time Out called the sequel a "fairly intriguing and atmospheric exercise in science fiction."

== Legacy ==
The British heavy metal band Iron Maiden based their song "Children of the Damned", from their 1982 album The Number of the Beast, on this movie and on Village of the Damned.
