= Murder Most Foul (film) =

1964 film by George Pollock

- Theatrical release poster by Tom Jung
- Directed by: George Pollock
- Screenplay by: David Pursall; Jack Seddon
- Based on: Mrs. McGinty's Dead; 1952 novel by Agatha Christie
- Produced by: Ben Arbeid
- Starring: Margaret Rutherford; Ron Moody; Bud Tingwell
- Cinematography: Desmond Dickinson
- Edited by: Ernest Walter
- Music by: Ron Goodwin
- Production company: Lawrence P. Bachman Production
- Distributed by: Metro-Goldwyn-Mayer
- Release date: March 1964 (UK)
- Running time: 90 minutes
- Country: United Kingdom
- Language: English

Murder Most Foul is a 1964 British comedy mystery film and the third of four Miss Marple films made by Metro-Goldwyn-Mayer. Loosely based on the 1952 novel Mrs McGinty's Dead by Agatha Christie, it stars Margaret Rutherford as Miss Jane Marple, Ron Moody as the theatre company director H. Driffold Cosgood, Charles Tingwell as Inspector Craddock, and Stringer Davis (Rutherford's husband) as Mr Stringer. The story is ostensibly based on Christie's novel, but notably changes the action and the characters. Hercule Poirot is replaced by Miss Marple and most of the other characters are not in the novel.

The film was released in 1964. It was directed by George Pollock, and David Pursall is credited with the adaptation. The music is by Ron Goodwin.

The title is a quotation from Hamlet (I.v.27–28), where the Ghost comments about his own death: "Murder most foul as in the best it is/But this most foul, strange and unnatural."

The third film in the MGM series, this was preceded by Murder She Said and Murder at the Gallop, and followed by Murder Ahoy!, all with Rutherford starring as Miss Marple.

== Plot ==
Margaret McGinty, a barmaid and former actress, is found hanged in her home. Her lodger, Harold Taylor, is discovered at the scene, appearing guilty. The evidence seems overwhelming, and Taylor is quickly tried. However, Miss Marple is the lone holdout on the jury, leading to a mistrial.

Despite Inspector Craddock's disapproval, Miss Marple undertakes her own investigation. Posing as a collector for a church jumble sale, she gains access to Mrs McGinty's home, where she discovers a newspaper with words cut out and several programmes for a murder-mystery play recently performed in the town. These clues suggest that Mrs McGinty had been blackmailing a member of the repertory company, the Cosgood Players.

Miss Marple auditions for the Cosgood Players under their actor-manager, Driffold Cosgood. Although her acting is unimpressive, she mentions having independent means, and Cosgood allows her to join the company unpaid, hoping she might act as a financier. Miss Marple's suspicions are confirmed when one of the actors, George Rowton, is poisoned shortly afterward. She takes lodging in the boarding house where the cast resides, continuing her inquiries. A copy of Cosgood's play, Remember September, is mysteriously left in her room. With the help of Mr Stringer, she researches the play's staging history and Mrs McGinty's prior connections to the company.

An attempt on Miss Marple's life claims the life of another actress, heightening the urgency of the investigation. Anticipating another attack during a theatre performance, Miss Marple positions herself strategically in the audience and on stage. She cleverly observes the interactions among the cast and ultimately unmasks the killer, revealing both the motivations behind the murders and the blackmail scheme: Bill Hanson, born Evelyn Kane, was blackmailed by McGinty, who fostered him before sending him to an orphanage, after his mother was executed for murdering her husband. Noticing his engagement to a rich heiress, she blackmailed him, leading him to murder her and Rowton, whose check he forged to pay her off to keep his facade.

After the case is resolved, Cosgood appeals to Miss Marple to finance a production of Remember September. She politely declines, stating, "Mr Cosgood, whatever else I may or may not be, I am definitely no angel."

== Cast ==
- Margaret Rutherford as Miss Jane Marple
- Ron Moody as H. Driffold Cosgood
- Bud Tingwell (credited as Charles Tingwell) as Inspector Craddock
- Andrew Cruickshank (credited as "Andrew Cruikshank") as Justice Crosby
- Megs Jenkins as Gladys Thomas, Mrs McGinty's sister
- Dennis Price as Harris Tumbrill, a theatrical agent
- Ralph Michael as Ralph Summers, a philandering former matinee idol
- James Bolam as Bill Hanson, an actor
- Stringer Davis as Jim Stringer
- Francesca Annis as Sheila Upward, an actress and heiress engaged to Bill Hanson
- Alison Seebohm as Eva McGonigall, a premonition-prone actress, recently broken up with George Rowton
- Terry Scott as Police Constable Wells
- Pauline Jameson as Maureen Summers, Ralph's wife
- Maurice Good as George Rowton
- Annette Kerr as Dorothy, an actress and murder victim
- Windsor Davies as Sergeant Brick
- Neil Stacy (as "Neil Stacey") as Arthur
- Stella Tanner as Flory, the landlady

== Production ==
The courthouse seen behind the opening credit "Metro-Goldwyn-Mayer Presents" is Aylesbury Crown Court in the market square of Aylesbury in Buckinghamshire.

The police station to which Miss Marple is taken for questioning by Inspector Craddock and Sergeant Brick, following the death of the actor George Rowton, is on Shady Lane in Watford, Hertfordshire.

The theatre in which the Cosgood Players perform Fly By Night and where much of the action takes place is the Palace Theatre on Clarendon Road in Watford. At the time of filming the theatre was being run by Jimmy Perry (co-creator of Dad's Army) and his wife Gilda.

The YMCA where Mr. Stringer stays and where Miss Marple meets him in the grounds to discuss her progress in the investigation – supposedly near the Palace Theatre where the Cosgood Players are performing, and their lodging house nearby – is actually Memorial Park in Pinner, in what is now the London Borough of Harrow.

The scene of the murder and associated village scenes were filmed in Sarratt near Rickmansworth in Hertfordshire.

== Notes ==
The title of the first film in the series, Murder She Said, is also the title of the Cosgood Players production that appears on the playbills in the first murder victim's suitcase. According to the playbill, the play was written by Agatha Christie.

An actual Christie play, The Mousetrap, is referenced by the director (Moody) at one point in the film.

Margaret Rutherford performs a section of the poem "The Shooting of Dan McGrew" by Robert W. Service in the film.
