= Woman to Woman =

Woman to Woman may refer to:

== Films ==
- Woman to Woman (1923 film), a British film written by Alfred Hitchcock and starring Betty Compson
- Woman to Woman (1929 film), a British film directed by Victor Saville
- Woman to Woman (1947 film), a British film starring Adele Dixon and Douglass Montgomery
- Woman to Woman (1950 film), a Spanish drama film directed by Luis Lucia

== In music ==
Albums

- Woman to Woman (Baccara album), 1999
- Woman to Woman (Beverley Craven, Judie Tzuke and Julia Fordham album), 2018
- Woman to Woman (Fem2fem album), 1993
- Woman to Woman (Keyshia Cole album), 2012
- Woman to Woman (Tammy Wynette album), 1974
- Woman to Woman, a 1989 album by jazz singer Cleo Laine
- Woman to Woman, a 2015 studio album by Esmé Patterson
- Woman to Woman: Songs of Survival, a 1999 album by gospel singer Vickie Winans

Songs

- "Woman to Woman" (Beverley Craven song), 1990
- "Woman to Woman" (Joe Cocker song), 1972
- "Woman to Woman" (Shirley Brown song), 1974
  - "Woman to Woman", a cover of the Brown song by Jaguar Wright, from Divorcing Neo 2 Marry Soul, 2005
- "Woman to Woman" (Tammy Wynette song), 1974
- Woman to Woman", a 1998 hit by country band The Lynns

== Other uses ==
- Woman to Woman (talk show), a US syndicated television show in 1983, hosted by Pat Mitchell
- Woman to Woman, a Mississippi Public Broadcasting show hosted by Pat Fordice and Juanita Sims Doty
- Woman to Woman: Candid Conversations from Me to You, a 2007 book by Christian writer Joyce Meyer
- Woman to Woman (play), a 1921 play by the British writer Michael Morton
- Woman to Woman (campaign), election campaign in the United Kingdom

== See also ==
- Kvinna Till Kvinna (English translation: Woman to Woman), a Swedish women's organisation
