= Martin Miller (actor) =

Czech actor (1899–1969)

- Miller in Peeping Tom (1960)
- Born: Johann Rudolph Müller; 2 September 1899; Kremsier, Moravia, Austria-Hungary
- Died: 26 August 1969 (aged 69); Innsbruck, Tyrol, Austria
- Other name: Martyn Miller
- Years active: 1943–1969
- Children: Daniel Miller

Martin Miller (born Johann Rudolph Müller; 2 September 1899 – 26 August 1969), was a Czech-Austrian character actor. He played many small roles in British films and television series from the early 1940s until his death. He was best known for playing eccentric doctors, scientists and professors, although he played a wide range of small, obscure roles—including photographers, waiters, a pet store dealer, rabbis, a Dutch sailor and a Swiss tailor. On stage he was noted in particular for his parodies of Adolf Hitler and roles as Dr. Einstein in Arsenic and Old Lace and Mr. Paravicini in The Mousetrap.

Miller appeared in several notable films, including Squadron Leader X (1943), English Without Tears (1944), The Third Man (1949), The Gamma People (1956), Peeping Tom (1960), Exodus, 55 Days at Peking (1963), The V.I.P.s (1963), The Pink Panther (1963), and The Yellow Rolls-Royce (1964). His most substantial roles include George II of Great Britain in Bonnie Prince Charlie (1948) and Kublai Khan in the Doctor Who serial Marco Polo. In the 1960s, he appeared in several ITC Entertainment cult television programmes, including Ghost Squad, Danger Man, The Saint, The Avengers, Department S and The Prisoner.

== Early life and background ==
Miller was born Rudolph Müller in the Moravian town of Kroměříž—then known as Kremsier in Austria-Hungary—on 2 September 1899. Little is known about his earlier life, but he started working as an actor in Vienna in 1921, and spent his early years as an actor mainly in theatre and cabaret in Austria and Czechoslovakia. He was a member of the Jewish League of Culture in Berlin in 1938–39. He fled Austria and arrived in London in March 1939 to pursue a career in the British theatre and film industry. He married Hannah Norbert, later Hannah Norbert-Miller, in 1946.

== Stage career ==
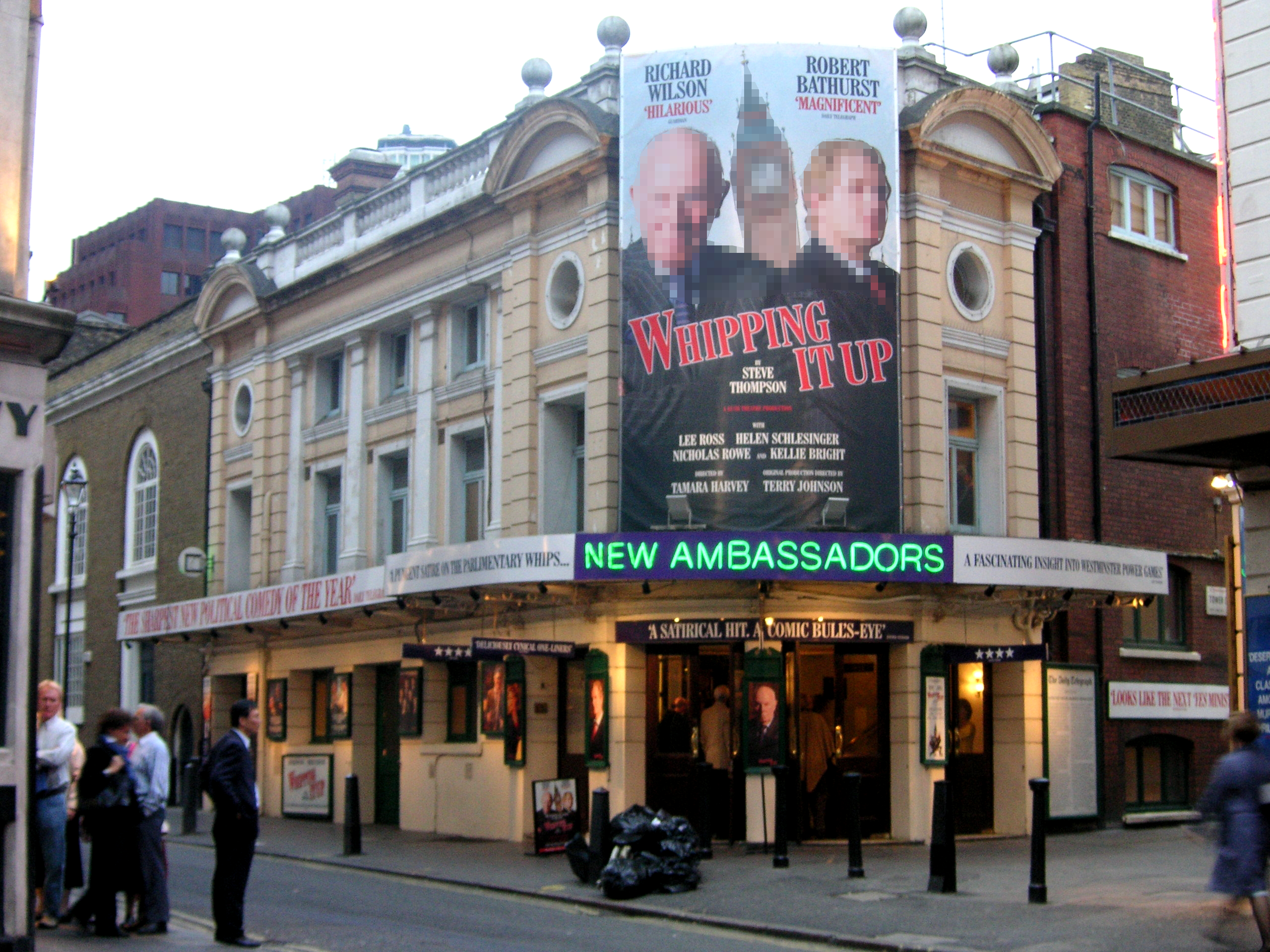
The Ambassadors Theatre where Miller portrayed Mr. Paravinci in The Mousetrap

In 1939, Miller was a co-founder of the Viennese Theatre Club of Paddington, a "celebrated émigré cabaret and theatre", also known as Das Laterndl. The theatrical group of talented Austrian exiles, which included the likes of Lona Cross, Fritz Schrecker and Marianne Walla became known for their sketches and plays which represented a "satirical commentary on Vienna under Nazi rule". Miller achieved fame for his parodies of Adolf Hitler, and he was asked to portray Hitler in the BBC German Service's propaganda campaign. He continued to be employed by the BBC after the war as a German-language author, actor, presenter and producer for the rest of his life. He also did much work arranging plays for the German and Austrian diaspora; for instance he arranged the production of Johann Wolfgang von Goethe's Iphigenia in Tauris in German at Wyndham's Theatre in October 1949 in coordination with the British Goethe Festival Society.

On stage Miller was noted in particular for his roles as Dr. Einstein in Arsenic and Old Lace between 1942 and 1946 and Mr. Paravicini in Agatha Christie's The Mousetrap at the Ambassadors Theatre from 1952, a role in which he was described as an "elderly foreigner" with a "painted face which he makes half devil, half jack-in-the-box". He worked mainly in London and New York City, and played Paravinci for over 1000 performances.

In 1951, Miller appeared alongside Lily Hann, Alan Tilvern, Gabriel Woolf and Alfie Bass in a production of Emanuel Litvinoff's Magnolia Street Story at the Embassy Theatre. At the end of 1959 he appeared in the successful musical Make Me an Offer at the Theatre Workshop in Stratford and the New Theatre in the West End, taking "his place as the least scrupulous and the most amusing of the dealers with a somewhat lighter but entirely acceptable rendering".

== Film and television career ==
=== 1940s ===
Miller made his British film debut in 1940 with an uncredited role opposite George Formby in the comedy Let George Do It!. In 1943, Miller was cast as Mr. Krohn in Lance Comfort's World War II spy drama Squadron Leader X alongside Beatrice Varley and Ann Dvorak, his first major film role. Soon afterwards, he played Doctor Novotny in Harold S. Bucquet's spy film The Adventures of Tartu, the first of many roles as a physician. Comfort hired him again the following year to appear alongside James Mason, Lucie Mannheim and Raymond Lovell in Hotel Reserve, a spy film set in a hotel in southern France just before World War II. He then had a small role as Schmidt in Harold French's romantic comedy English Without Tears (1944) alongside Michael Wilding, Margaret Rutherford and Penelope Dudley-Ward.

Miller played a morgue keeper in Vernon Sewell's 1945 thriller Latin Quarter. The following year he had a role as Professor Hansen alongside Robert Newton in Lawrence Huntington's Night Boat to Dublin, and portrayed a postman in Maclean Rogers's romantic drama Woman to Woman, based on the play by Michael Morton.

In 1947, he starred as a professor in Vernon Sewell's comedy The Ghosts of Berkeley Square. The film, an adaptation of the novel No Nightingales by Caryl Brahms and S. J. Simon, was inspired by the reputation of the property at 50 Berkeley Square as "the most haunted house in London", and co-starred Robert Morley and Felix Aylmer. That year, Miller also portrayed Dr. Hans Tautz in Anthony Kimmins' drama Mine Own Executioner opposite Burgess Meredith, Dulcie Gray and Michael Shepley. Mine Own Executioner was entered into the 1947 Cannes Film Festival.

In 1948, Miller portrayed a police inspector in Terence Young's One Night with You, which also featured a young Christopher Lee in a minor role. After an uncredited role as an Italian waiter at the Savoy Hotel in The Blind Goddess (1948), he had a substantial role as George II of Great Britain in Anthony Kimmins's biopic Bonnie Prince Charlie about the Jacobite risings alongside David Niven, who portrayed Charles II. In 1949, he appeared as Tony the café proprietor in Lawrence Huntington's Man on the Run; a customer in Jack Warner's The Huggetts Abroad; Leon Stolz in Arthur Crabtree's Don't Ever Leave Me alongside Petula Clark and Jimmy Hanley; and had uncredited roles as black marketeer Herr Schindler in I Was a Male War Bride and as a headwaiter in the classic film noir The Third Man opposite Orson Welles and Joseph Cotten.

=== 1950s ===
In 1951, Miller played a pawnbroker in the television movie The Angel Who Pawned Her Harp, and had an uncredited role as a photographer in Joseph M. Newman's I'll Get You for This. After a role as a Dutch seaman in Paul L. Stein's Counterblast alongside Robert Beatty, Mervyn Johns and Nova Pilbeam he played the character Carlo Penezii in the "Gigolo and Gigolette" segment of the anthology film Encore—which was entered into the 1952 Cannes Film Festival. In 1952, he appeared as a rabbi in the television series Portrait by Rembrandt and as a photographer in Where's Charley?.

In 1953, Miller had a minor role in Emeric Pressburger's Twice Upon a Time, a film which concerns a pair of twin sisters who are separated, when their parents divorce. Between 1953 and 1954, he appeared in two episodes of Douglas Fairbanks Jr., Presents. In 1954, Miller portrayed Dr. Brukmann in Front Page Story, and Professor Hyman Pfumbaum in You Know What Sailors Are, The following year he had a role as Iggy Pulitzer in George More O'Ferrall's The Woman for Joe opposite Diane Cilento and George Baker; and portrayed a Swiss tailor in John Paddy Carstairs's comedy Man of the Moment alongside Norman Wisdom. He also had an uncredited role as a band leader in An Alligator Named Daisy.

In 1956—a busy year for Miller—he portrayed a hotel keeper in the Sailor of Fortune episode It Started in Paris and as Chella in the Festival of Fear episode of The Adventures of Aggie. He had an uncredited role in Jay Lewis's comedy The Baby and the Battleship, and played Professor Topolski in Child in the House and Lochner in John Gilling's science fiction picture The Gamma People alongside Paul Douglas, Eva Bartok and Leslie Phillips. In 1957, he starred in Hugo Fregonese's World War II film Seven Thunders about two British escaped prisoners-of-war, opposite Stephen Boyd, James Robertson Justice and Kathleen Harrison.

In 1958, Miller played Brunet in Maclean Rogers' drama Mark of the Phoenix alongside Julia Arnall, Sheldon Lawrence and Anton Diffring. He appeared twice as Nat Danziger in ITV Play of the Week in 1955 and 1958, and in three episodes of the BBC's Sunday Night Theatre—one in 1956 and two in 1959. He again played a rabbi in a 1956 episode of ITV Television Playhouse entitled Skipper Next to God, and made two further appearances in the series later in the decade. In 1959, Miller had an uncredited role as Kakky in Expresso Bongo directed by Val Guest. He played a doctor in the television film Henry IV and appeared as Dr. Schrott in Anthony Asquith's film Libel, starring alongside Olivia de Havilland and Dirk Bogarde.

=== 1960s–death ===
In 1960, Miller portrayed Piggy in Robert Siodmak's The Rough and the Smooth opposite Tony Britton, William Bendix and Edward Chapman. He played Dr. Pfeiffer in the episode Twentieth Century Theatre: The Price of Freedom of the BBC Sunday Night Play. The same year, Miller starred in Michael Powell's psychological horror thriller Peeping Tom, playing a doctor who the main protagonist (Karlheinz Böhm), a serial killer who murders women while using a portable movie camera fitted with a spike to record their dying expressions of terror, approaches to cure his scopophilia. It was a controversial film at the time of release with themes of child abuse, sadomasochism and fetishism, although Miller's performance, played comically, stood in contrast to the film's dark themes, and it has since gained a cult following and is now considered a masterpiece.

In 1960, Miller also portrayed Stravros in the episode The Lovers of the series Danger Man and Dr. Samuel Odenheim in Otto Preminger's war film Exodus opposite Paul Newman, Eva Marie Saint, Ralph Richardson and Sal Mineo. In 1962, Miller starred as Rossi in the Hammer Film Productions horror The Phantom of the Opera under the directorship of Terence Fisher, and had roles in the TV series Man of the World, Zero One, and Ghost Squad.

In 1963—a busy and high-status year for Miller— he featured in Ken Annakin's comedy The Fast Lady. He portrayed Dr. Schroeder in Incident at Midnight; and reprised this character in the television series The Edgar Wallace Mystery Theatre. Next was a role as Hugo Bergmann in the Nicholas Ray-directed historical epic 55 Days at Peking opposite Charlton Heston, Ava Gardner, and David Niven. The film is a dramatization of the Battle of Peking during the 1900 Boxer Rebellion and received two Academy Award nominations for Dimitri Tiomkin (Best Song and Original Music Score). The same year, Miller appeared as Dr. Schwutzbacher in Anthony Asquith's The V.I.P.s as Dr. Schwatzbacher opposite Richard Burton, Elizabeth Taylor, Louis Jourdan, Orson Welles and Academy Award for Best Supporting Actress winner Margaret Rutherford. The film was one of the biggest British MGM productions in years. The team of director Asquith, producer Anatole de Grunwald and writer Rattigan produced another portmanteau film the following year entitled The Yellow Rolls-Royce, in which Miller played a minor role as a head waiter. Also in 1963, he played the photographer Pierre Luigi in Blake Edwards's The Pink Panther opposite Niven, Peter Sellers and Robert Wagner

Miller as Professor Spencer in The Avengers (1966)

In 1964, Miller appeared as Professor Gruber in the science fiction horror picture Children of the Damned, and played Kublai Khan in two episodes of Doctor Who: "Assassin at Peking" and "Mighty Kublai Khan". He also portrayed Dr. Zoren in the "Fish on the Hook" episode of Danger Man, and from 1964 onwards, Miller became a regular cast member in ITC productions, albeit with minor roles. He appeared in two episodes of The Saint in (1964-5), and had an uncredited role as Professor Spencer in The Avengers episode "The Master Minds". He also starred as Herman in the Christopher Miles comedy film Up Jumped a Swagman—which co-starred other ITC regulars Annette Andre and Ronald Radd.

In 1966, Miller appeared in the BBC television series Theatre 625 episode "Focus" and in The Baron episode, Enemy of the State. In 1967, he starred as Montross in The Forsyte Saga episode "Portrait of Fleur" and made an appearance as a watchmaker in The Prisoner episode "It's Your Funeral". In 1969, he featured in the BBC Play of the Month, playing Professeur Vivier in the episode "Maigret at Bay", and also had roles in The Troubleshooters and Doctor in the House before making his final appearance as Dutrov in the series Department S in the classic episode The Perfect Operation.

Miller was booked for a role in The Last Valley, but while shooting on location in Innsbruck he died aged 69 on 26 August 1969 after suffering a heart attack.

== Filmography ==
=== Films ===
Year	Title	Role	Notes
1943	Squadron Leader X	Mr. Krohn	
1943	The Adventures of Tartu	Dr. Novotny	
1944	Hotel Reserve	Walter Vogel	
1944	English Without Tears	Schmidt	
1945	Latin Quarter	Morgue keeper	
1946	Night Boat to Dublin	Professor Hansen	
1947	Woman to Woman	Postman	
1947	The Ghosts of Berkeley Square	Professor	
1947	Mine Own Executioner	Dr. Hans Tautz	
1948	One Night with You	Police Inspector	
1948	Counterblast	Van Hessian, Dutch Seaman	
1948	The Blind Goddess	Mario, the Waiter at Savoy	
1948	Bonnie Prince Charlie	George II of Great Britain	
1949	The Huggetts Abroad	Customer	
1949	Man on the Run	Tony, the Cafe Proprietor	(as Martyn Miller)
1949	Don't Ever Leave Me	Leon Stoltz	
1949	I Was a Male War Bride	Herr Schindler, the Black Marketeer	Uncredited
1949	The Third Man	Headwaiter	Uncredited
1951	I'll Get You for This	Photographer	Uncredited
1951	Counterblast	Van Hessian	(segment "Gigolo and Gigolette")
1951	Encore	Carlo Penezzi	
1952	Where's Charley?	Photographer	
1953	Twice Upon a Time	Eipeldauer	
1953	The Genie	.	
1954	Front Page Story	Dr. Brukmann	
1954	You Know What Sailors Are	Prof. Hyman Pfumbaum	
1954	To Dorothy a Son	Brodcynsky	
1954	Mad About Men	Dr. Fergus	
1955	The Woman for Joe	Iggy Pulitzer	
1955	Man of the Moment	Swiss Tailor	
1955	An Alligator Named Daisy	Bandleader	Uncredited
1956	The Gamma People	Lochner	
1956	The Baby and the Battleship	Paolo	Uncredited
1956	Child in the House	Professor Topolski	
1957	The Beasts of Marseilles	Heinrich Isadore Schlip	
1958	Mark of the Phoenix	Brunet	
1959	Violent Moment	Hendricks	
1959	The Rough and the Smooth	Piggy	
1959	Libel	Dr. Schrott	
1959	Expresso Bongo	Kakky	Uncredited
1960	Peeping Tom	Dr. Rosen	
1960	Exodus	Dr. Odenheim	
1962	The Phantom of the Opera	Rossi	
1962	The Fast Lady	Man with Microscope	
1962	Incident at Midnight	Dr. Schroeder	
1962	55 Days at Peking	Hugo Bergmann	
1962	The V.I.P.s	Dr. Schwatzbacher	
1962	The Pink Panther	Pierre Luigi	
1962	Children of the Damned	Professor Gruber	
1964	The Yellow Rolls-Royce	Head Waiter	
1965	Up Jumped a Swagman	Herman	
1968	Assignment to Kill	Police Chief	Uncredited

=== Television ===
Year	Title	Role	Notes
1951	The Angel Who Pawned Her Harp	Webman the Pawnbroker	TV film
1952	Portrait by Rembrandt	Rabbi Menasseh Ben Israel	TV film
1953	Douglas Fairbanks Jr., Presents	Papa	Series episode "The Genie"
1954	Douglas Fairbanks Jr., Presents	Polwatski	Series episode "The Relative Truth"
1955	ITV Play of the Week		Series episode "The Salt Land"
1955	Mother Michel and Her Cat	Dealer in pets	TV film
1956	Sailor of Fortune	Hotelkeeper	Series episode "It Started in Paris"
1956	ITV Television Playhouse	Rabbi	Series episode "Skipper Next to God"
1956	BBC Sunday Night Theatre	Nicholas Loewenschild	Series episode "The Cold Light"
1956	The Adventures of Aggie	Chella	Series episode "Festival of Fear"
1957	Dixon of Dock Green	Papa Kolinsky	Series episode "A Penn'orth of Allsorts"
1958	ITV Play of the Week	Nat Danziger	Series episode "The Big Knife"
1959	BBC Sunday Night Theatre	Matyas Rakosi	Series episode "Shadow of Heroes"
1959	ITV Television Playhouse	Gus	Series episode "A Memory of Two Mondays"
1959	Henry IV	Doctor	TV film
1959	Armchair Theatre		Series episode "Light from a Star"
1959	BBC Sunday Night Theatre	Abraham Kaplan	Series episode "Street Scene"
1960	ITV Television Playhouse	Ambrose Solto	Series episode "Night School"
1960	BBC Sunday Night Play	Dr. Pfeiffer	Series episode "Twentieth Century Theatre: The Price of Freedom"
1960	Danger Man	Stavros	Series episode "The Lovers"
1961	Theatre 70		Series episode "The Watchman of Saul"
1961	Echo Four Two	Hymie	Series episode "There She Blows"
1962	Dial RIX	Mr. Green	Series episode "Between the Balance Sheets"
1962	Man of the World	Dr. Stelitz	Series episode "Blaze of Glory"
1962	Zero One	Papa Kadopolis	Series episode "The Marriage Broker"
1962	Ghost Squad	Braune	Series episode "The Green Shoes"
1963	The Edgar Wallace Mystery Theatre	Dr. Schroeder	Series episode "Incident at Midnight"
1963	The Bergonzi Hand	Davidoff	TV film
1963	Espionage	Mr. Smith	Series episode "The Incurable One"
1963	The Sentimental Agent	Astolat	Series episode "A Little Sweetness and Light"
1964	A Little Big Business	Lazlo	Series episode "Episode #1.1"
1964	The Saint	Jerome	Series episode "Jeannine"
1964	Doctor Who	Kublai Khan	Series episodes "Mighty Kublai Khan", "Assassin at Peking"
1964	Secret Agent	Dr. Zoren	Series episode "Fish on the Hook"
1965	A Little Big Business	Lazlo	Series episode "Funny Things: People"
1965	The Saint	Mr. Justin	Series episode "The Smart Detective"
1965	The Third Man	Heinrich Miron	Series episode "The House of Bon Bons"
1965	The Avengers	Professor Spencer	Series episode "The Master Minds"
1966	Theatre 625	Father	Series episode "Focus"
1966	The Baron	.	Series episode "Enemy of the State"
1966	Adam Adamant Lives!	Dr. Heindrick	Series episode "A Slight Case of Reincarnation"
1967	The Forsyte Saga	Montross	Series episode "Portrait of Fleur"
1967	The Prisoner	Number Fifty Four	Series episode "It's Your Funeral"
1969	BBC Play of the Month	Professeur Vivier	Series episode "Maigret at Bay"
1969	Mord nach der Oper	.	TV film
1969	Mogul	Dr. Israel Berg	Series episode "They Call Me Israel"
1969	Doctor in the House	Professor Pearson	Series episode "It's All Go..."
1969	Department S	Dutrov	Series episode "The Perfect Operation", (final appearance)
