= Libel! =

Play by Edward Wooll

- Written by: Edward Wooll
- Original language: English
- Genre: Courtroom drama

Premiere
- Date premiered: 2 April 1934
- Place premiered: Playhouse Theatre

Libel! is a play written by Edward Wooll. It debuted on 2 April 1934 at the Playhouse Theatre in London's West End, where it was directed by Leon M. Lion. Producer Gilbert Miller brought it to Henry Miller's Theatre on Broadway in December 1935, with Otto Preminger directing.

Wooll, a barrister of the Inner Temple and Recorder of Carlisle, wrote the play under the pseudonym "Ward Dorane".

Wooll wrote a novelization in 1935, and the play was adapted as a movie in 1959.

== Plot ==
Sir Mark Loddon, a war hero and Member of Parliament, is suing a newspaper for libel. The paper claims that he is an impostor, a fellow soldier and friend of Loddon from the war who happened to resemble the original Loddon. The play is set in the courtroom as the trial for the lawsuit takes place. Loddon takes the stand as the first witness. He recounts being taken prisoner during the war, then escaping a few years later. After the war he married his pre-war fiancée, Enid, and was elected to the House of Commons. However, he says he has no recollection of events from before he was taken prisoner, a condition he attributes to shell shock. On cross-examination, defence lawyer Thomas Foxley accuses Loddon of being Frank Wenley, a soldier who escaped with Loddon and had strikingly similar features. Another soldier from the escape, Patrick Buckenham, testifies that Loddon and Wenley looked so much alike that they could have been twins. He believes Wenley killed the real Loddon. Loddon's attorney elicits testimony that Buckenham is being paid a stipend by the newspaper and had previously attempted to blackmail Loddon.

Dr. Emile Flordon testifies to treating a severely beaten patient who was wearing a jacket from Loddon's brigade. The patient has recovered physically, but his injuries have left him mentally incapacitated. This man could be Wenley, or he could be Loddon. Foxley calls Enid Loddon to the stand, and she testifies that she no longer believes her husband is the real Mark Loddon. Just as it seems Loddon will lose his case, he has a sudden memory and asks to take the stand again. Loddon explains that the injured man was a German soldier that he encountered while escaping. He beat the man and switched clothing to aid the escape. He cuts open the lining of the jacket that Flordon had brought from his patient. Loddon pulls out a photograph of Enid from before the war, saying it was a gift from her before he left. The defence accepts this demonstration as proof of Loddon's identity. He wins his case and reunites with his wife.

== Productions ==
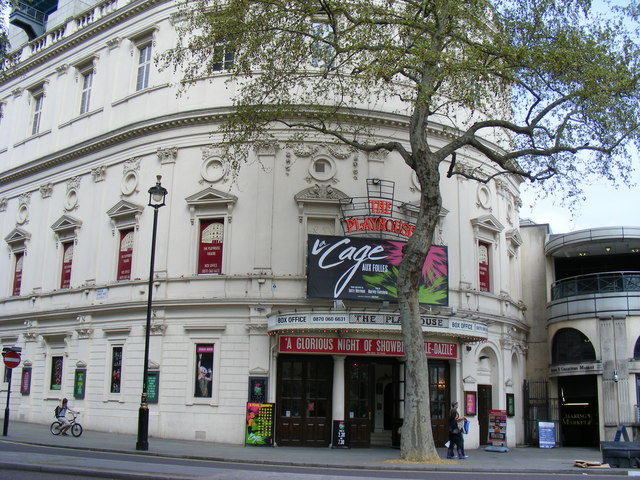
Libel! debuted at London's Playhouse Theatre in 1934.

The play debuted at the Playhouse Theatre on 2 April 1934, with Leon M. Lion producing. It played there until it was transferred to the Aldwych Theatre on 10 September 1934. It closed on 17 November 1934. On 20 December 1935, a production opened on Broadway at Henry Miller's Theatre. Gilbert Miller produced, and Otto Preminger directed. The Broadway production ran until May 1936, with 158 performances.

== Cast and characters ==
The characters and cast from the West End and Broadway production are given below:

Cast of the West End and Broadway productions of Libel!
Character	West End cast	Broadway cast
Associate	Basil Dignam	Lewis Dayton
William Bale	Michael Barry	Charles Francis
Sir. Wilfred Kelling, K.C. M.P.	Nigel Playfair	Ernest Lawford
The Hon. Sir Arthur Tuttington	Aubrey Mather	Frederick Leister
Thomas Foxley, K.C.	Leon M. Lion	Wilfrid Lawson
Sir Mark Loddon, Bart. M.P.	Malcolm Keen	Colin Clive
Lady Enid Loddon	Frances Doble	Joan Marion
Sarah Carleton	Gwendoline Hill	Helen Goss
George Hemsby	Mark Dignam	Colin Hunter
Patrick Buckingham	James Carew	Arthur Vinton
Emile Flordon	Anthony Holles	Boris Marshalov
Admiral Fairfax Loddon	Frank Mellor	Charles Wellesley
Captain Gerald Loddon	John Stewart-Bingley	Larry Johns
General Winterton, C.B.	John H. Moore	Edward Oldfield
Lady Winterton	Jocelyn Braithwaite	Emily Gilbert
Major Brampton	Matthew Forsyth	Neville Heber-Percy
Numero Quinze	Beckett Bould	Robert Simmons
Sir Eric Foulsham	W. A. Reid	
Evelyn Filbey		Jane Archer

== Reception ==
The Spectator complimented the acting of the West End cast, but questioned whether a severely shell shocked veteran would be able to win election to Parliament. Kirkus Reviews called it a "well sustained story of double identity".

== Novel and adaptations ==
Wooll's novel of the same name was published by Blackie & Son of London in 1935, and reviewed in The Deseret News, 7 March 1936.

A 1938 BBC television production featured actor Wyndham Goldie, husband of eventual BBC television producer Grace Wyndham Goldie.

The play was adapted for radio in 1941 and 1943 using the original references to the First World War. Ronald Colman played the leading role in the 13 January 1941 CBS Lux Radio Theatre broadcast, with Otto Kruger and Frances Robinson. On 15 March 1943 Colman and Kruger reprised their roles for a second Lux Theatre broadcast.

The play was adapted into a movie, Libel, in 1959, relating to events of the Second World War, not the First. It was directed by Anthony Asquith, and starred Olivia de Havilland and Dirk Bogarde. The screenplay was by Anatole de Grunwald and Karl Tunberg.
