= Paula Valenska =

Czech actress (1922–1994)

- Born: Milada Anna Šupitová; 2 July 1922; Mělník, Czechoslovakia
- Died: 26 September 1994 (aged 72); Ventura, California, U.S.
- Other name: Pavla Vrbenská
- Occupation: Actress
- Years active: 1944–1949 (film)
- Spouse: Joseph Rehka Zdenek (m. 1962)

Paula Valenska (2 July 1922 – 26 September 1994) was a Czech actress noted for her roles in 1940s films. After appearing in several films in her native Czechoslovakia she went to Britain to star in two films produced by Anatole de Grunwald.

Valenska graduated from the Musical and Dramatic Conservatory in Prague. She married Joseph Rehka Zdenek in Beverly Hills, California in August 1962, and applied for U.S. citizenship the following year. In 1966, it was reported by the Los Angeles Times that the couple were breeding Arabian horses.

In June 1980, Valenska was then working as a real estate agent in Camarillo, California. She died in Ventura, California on 26 September 1994, at the age of 72.

== Selected filmography ==
- Spring Song (1944)
- Saturday (1945)
- No Surgery Hours Today (1948)
- Bond Street (1948)
- Golden Arrow (1949)

== Bibliography ==
- Chibnall, Steve & McFarlane, Brian. The British 'B' Film. Palgrave MacMillan, 2009.
