= Colin Gordon =

British actor (1911–1972)

- Born: 27 April 1911; British Ceylon
- Died: 4 October 1972 (aged 61); Haslemere, Surrey, England
- Occupation: Actor
- Years active: 1934–1972
- Spouse(s): Sidney Eileen Short (m. 1936; div. 1943) Zena Howard (m. 1945, separated)
- Children: 1

Colin Gordon (27 April 1911 – 4 October 1972) was a British actor. Although primarily a stage actor he made numerous appearances on television and in cinema films, generally in comedies. His stage career was mainly in the West End, but he was seen in the provinces in some touring productions.

== Biography ==
=== Early years ===
Gordon was born in British Ceylon, the son of William Arthur Gordon and his wife Lily Vera, née Troup. He was educated at Marlborough College and Christ Church, Oxford. He first appeared on the professional stage in repertory at the Palace Theatre, Watford from January to December 1934. He made his first West End appearance in 1934 as the hind legs of Alfred, the carthorse, in a production of Toad of Toad Hall at the Royalty Theatre. At the same theatre he played James in Frolic Wind (March 1935, described by The Stage as "a distinguished failure"), and Peter in Closing At Sunrise (September 1935). From 1936 to 1939 he directed the Fred Melville Repertory Company in Brixton. He served in the army during the Second World War for six years.

Gordon was taken ill whilst working in South Africa and brought home to Surrey, where he died at the age of 61. He was buried with his wife at St Andrew's Church, Didling in West Sussex.

== Stage roles 1948–1970 ==
Date	Theatre	Play	Role	Notes
Mar 1948	Apollo	The Happiest Days of Your Life	Rupert Billings	received the Clarence Derwent Award
Mar 1951	Wyndham's	The Love of Four Colonels	Colonel Desmond De S Rinder-Sparrow	
Mar 1953	Globe	The White Carnation	Sir Horace Duncan	
Oct 1953	Coronet	The Little Hut	Henry	Broadway debut
Mar 1955	Duchess	Misery Me!	Julius Ring	
Jul 1955	Duke of York's	Wild Thyme	Seymour Verity	
Dec 1956	Aldwych	The Touch of Fear	Alec Barnes	
Mar 1957	Arts	The Wit to Woo	Percy Trellis	
Mar 1959	Guildford Repertory	Members Only	Percy	Also director
Nov 1959	Theatre Royal, Windsor	Break for Commercials	Gregory Drake	
May 1960	Theatre Royal, Windsor	Handful of Tansy	Sir Matthew Carr	
Jun 1960	Everyman, Cheltenham	I Seem to Know Your Face	Percy	Also director
Oct 1961	Theatre Royal, Windsor	Mr Rhodes	Dr Jameson	
Mar 1964	On tour	March Hares	Dr Unwin	
Aug 1964	On tour	Alibi for a Judge	Thomas Empton QC	
Aug 1965	Savoy	Alibi for a Judge	Thomas Empton QC	
Nov 1967	Duke of York's	Relatively Speaking	Philip	took over the part from Michael Hordern
Jun 1969	Belgrade, Coventry	Never Say Die	Richard Blake	
Mar 1970	Royal Court	A Who's Who of Flapland	Cast member	

Source: Who's Who in the Theatre

== Screen ==
Gordon had a long career in British cinema and television from the 1940s to the 1970s, often playing government officials. His films include The Pink Panther and Casino Royale (both with Peter Sellers, alongside whom he made five films). In the ITC series The Prisoner (1967) he portrayed Number Two twice, in "The General" and "A. B. and C." . Gordon was a regular in another ITC production, The Baron, playing civil servant Templeton-Green opposite Steve Forrest. He also starred in The Invisible Man (1958 TV series) episode "Play to Kill", (series 1, episode 6, 1959); was the host and occasional narrator of the 1969 London Weekend Television series The Complete and Utter History of Britain, (which arose from a pre-Monty Python collaboration between Michael Palin and Terry Jones); and was the airport commandant in the 1967 Doctor Who story The Faceless Ones. He was also in Bachelor Father and made two guest appearances in Steptoe and Son. In 1961 he appeared as the doctor in "The Lift" episode of Hancock's Half Hour. In 1970 he appeared in the UFO episode "The Cat with Ten Lives". He also appeared as Walpole Gibb in the ATV/ITC series Hine in 1971.

== Radio ==
For many years, from 1953 onwards, he played Tony Fellows, fictional husband to wife 'Ann ', played by Diana Churchill (actress), and brother-in-law to David Alexander Bliss, (played by George Cole (actor)), in ' A Life of Bliss '.

== Film roles ==
- Jim the Penman (1947) (by Charles Lawrence Young) as Roberts
- Bond Street (1948) as Clerk in Travel Agency
- The Winslow Boy (1948) (uncredited)
- It's Hard to Be Good (1948) as Neighbour with Baby (uncredited)
- Edward, My Son (1949) as Ellerby
- Helter Skelter (1949) as Chadbeater Longwick
- Golden Arrow (1949) as Connelly
- Traveller's Joy (1949) as Tom Wright
- The Third Visitor (1951) as Bill Millington
- The Long Dark Hall (1951) as Pound
- Circle of Danger (1951) as Col. Fairbairn
- Laughter in Paradise (1951) as Station Constable
- The Man in the White Suit (1951) as Hill
- The Lady with a Lamp (1951)
- Green Grow the Rushes (1951) as Roderick Fisherwick
- Mandy (1952) as Woollard (Junior)
- The Hour of 13 (1952) as MacStreet
- Folly to Be Wise (1952) as Prof. James Mutch
- Grand National Night (1953) as Buns Darling
- Innocents in Paris (1953) as Customs Officer
- The Heart of the Matter (1953) as Secretary (uncredited)
- Up to His Neck (1955) as Lt. Cmdr. Sterning
- Little Red Monkey (1955) as Harry Martin, reporter
- John and Julie (1955) as Mr. Swayne
- Escapade (1955) as Deeson, reporter
- Jumping for Joy (1956) as Max, 1st Commentator
- Keep It Clean (1956) as Peter, Marquess of Hurlingford
- The Green Man (1956) as Reginald Willoughby-Cruft
- A Touch of the Sun (1956) as Cecil Flick
- Up in the World (1956) as Fletcher Hetherington
- The Extra Day (1956) as Sir George Howard
- The Key Man (1957) as Larry Parr
- The One That Got Away (1957) as Army Interrogator
- The Safecracker (1958) as Dakers
- Virgin Island (US: Our Virgin Island, 1958) as The Commissioner
- The Doctor's Dilemma (1958) as Newspaper Man
- The Crowning Touch (1959) as Stacey
- Alive and Kicking (1959) as Bird Watcher
- The Mouse That Roared (1959) as BBC Announcer
- Bobbikins (1959) as Dr. Phillips
- Please Turn Over (1959) as Maurice
- Carry On Constable (1960) (uncredited)
- The Day They Robbed the Bank of England (1960) as Benge
- The Big Day (1960) as George Baker
- Make Mine Mink (1960) (uncredited)
- His and Hers (1961) as TV Announcer
- Seven Keys (1961) as Mr. Barber
- House of Mystery (1961) as Burdon
- Very Important Person (1961) as Briggs
- Don't Bother to Knock (1961) as Rolsom
- Three on a Spree (1961) as Mitchell
- Crooks Anonymous (1962) as Drunk
- Night of the Eagle (1962) as Lindsay Carr
- Strongroom (1962) as Mr. Spencer
- In the Doghouse (1962) as Dean
- The Devil's Agent (1962) as Count Dezsepalvy
- The Boys (1962) as Gordon Lonsdale
- The Running Man (1963) as Solicitor
- Heavens Above! (1963) as Prime Minister
- Bitter Harvest (1963) as Charles
- The Pink Panther (1963) as Tucker
- The Counterfeit Constable (1964) as Le dentiste W. Martin
- The Liquidator (1965) as Vicar
- The Psychopath (1966) as Dr. Glyn
- The Great St. Trinian's Train Robbery (1966) as Noakes
- The Trygon Factor (1966) as Dice
- The Family Way (1966) as Mr. Hutton
- Casino Royale (1967) as Casino Director
- Don't Raise the Bridge, Lower the River (1968) as Mr. Hartford
- Subterfuge (1968) as Kitteridge
- Mischief (1969) as Mr. Crawford
- The Body Beneath (1970) as Graham Ford

== Sources ==
- Herbert, Ian, ed. (1977). Who's Who in the Theatre (sixteenth ed.). London and Detroit: Pitman Publishing and Gale Research. ISBN 978-0-273-00163-8.
- Obituary, The Stage, 12 October 1972, page 20.
