= Libel (film) =

1959 British film by Anthony Asquith

- 1959 Theatrical Poster
- Directed by: Anthony Asquith
- Written by: Anatole de Grunwald; Karl Tunberg
- Based on: Libel! 1934 play by Edward Wooll
- Produced by: Anatole de Grunwald
- Starring: Dirk Bogarde; Olivia de Havilland; Paul Massie; Robert Morley; Wilfrid Hyde-White
- Cinematography: Robert Krasker
- Edited by: Frank Clarke
- Music by: Benjamin Frankel
- Production company: De Grunwald Productions
- Distributed by: Metro-Goldwyn-Mayer
- Release date: 23 October 1959
- Running time: 100 minutes
- Country: United Kingdom
- Language: English
- Budget: $615,000
- Box office: $1,170,000

Libel is a 1959 British drama film directed by Anthony Asquith and starring Olivia de Havilland, Dirk Bogarde, Paul Massie, Wilfrid Hyde-White and Robert Morley. The screenplay was by Anatole de Grunwald and Karl Tunberg from a 1935 play of the same name by Edward Wooll.

== Plot ==
While travelling in London, Canadian World War II veteran pilot Jeffrey Buckenham sees baronet Sir Mark Sebastian Loddon on television leading a tour of his ancestral home in England. Buckenham recalls that he was held in a POW camp in Germany with Loddon, whom the Germans captured during the Dunkirk evacuation of 1940. Buckenham is convinced that Loddon is Frank Wellney, a British actor. Wellney and Loddon shared a POW hut in 1945 and bore a striking resemblance to each other.

Buckenham confronts Loddon and, with encouragement from Loddon's scheming cousin Gerald Loddon, writes to a tabloid newspaper, claiming that Wellney is posing as Loddon. In response, Loddon sues Buckenham and the newspaper for libel, although his memory is affected by his wartime trauma.

During the libel trial, Buckenham and Loddon tell their versions of wartime imprisonment and their escape. Buckenham had liked Loddon and despised Wellney. In spring 1945, the three prisoners escaped their POW camp and headed toward the Dutch border, seeking advancing Allied forces. Loddon wore his British army uniform and Wellney disguised himself in civilian clothes. One night, having gone without food for days, Buckenham left Loddon and Wellney alone to steal food from a farm. As Buckenham returned, he heard shots. In the mist, he witnessed one man in a British uniform lying on the ground, apparently dead, and another fleeing in civilian clothes. Buckenham believed that he had witnessed Wellney fleeing the scene of Loddon's murder.

During the trial, Lodden is found to be missing part of his right index finger, as had Wellney, and Loddon claims it to be the result of gunfire. Loddon also does not appear to have a childhood scar on his leg. Wellney's hair was prematurely grey, as is Loddon's. Buckenham recounts how Wellney often asked Loddon about his personal life during their imprisonment, and Loddon even joked that Wellney could be mistaken for him. As evidence mounts, even Loddon's loyal wife Margaret begins to doubt her husband's identity.

Defence barrister Hubert Foxley produces a courtroom surprise, revealing that the uniformed man that Buckenham had seen did not die. Although the man is alive, his face is horribly disfigured, his right arm has been amputated and he has become deranged. He has been living in a German asylum since the war, known simply as "Number Fifteen," his bed number. When Foxley brings the man into the courtroom, the man and Loddon recognise each other and Loddon's memory starts to return.

In desperation, Loddon's barrister calls Margaret to the stand, but she testifies that she now believes her husband to be Wellney, the impostor, implying that "Number Fifteen" is the real Loddon. Later, Margaret confronts her husband, who desperately walks the night trying to remember more. Seeing his reflection in a canal unlocks his memories. Wellney did try to kill him while his back was turned, but Loddon saw Wellney's reflection in the water and won their ensuing fight. He remembers beating Wellney harshly with a farm tool before switching their clothes and fleeing.

In court, Loddon remembers a medallion hidden in his jacket lining that Margaret had given him in 1939 before he left for France. By proving that the medallion had been in Wellney's possession all the time, Loddon wins the libel case and Margaret realizes that her husband is whom she had thought that he was. Buckenham and Loddon also reconcile, although Buckenham and the newspaper must pay damages.

== Cast ==
- Dirk Bogarde as Sir Mark Loddon/Frank Wellney/Number Fifteen
- Olivia de Havilland as Lady Margaret Loddon
- Paul Massie as Jeffrey Buckenham
- Robert Morley as Sir Wilfred
- Wilfrid Hyde White as Hubert Foxley
- Anthony Dawson as Gerald Lodden
- Richard Wattis as the judge
- Martin Miller as Dr. Schrott
- Richard Dimbleby as himself
- Millicent Martin as Maisie
- Robert Shaw and Geoffrey Bayldon as photographers
- Sam Kydd as newspaper vendor (uncredited)
- Oliver Reed as extra in courtroom visitors' gallery (uncredited)

== Production ==
The film's location shots include Longleat House, Wiltshire (fictionalised as Ingworth House) and London.

== Reception ==
=== Box office ===
According to MGM records, the film earned $245,000 in the U.S. and Canada and $925,000 in other markets, resulting in a profit of $10,000.

=== Critical ===
In British Sound Films: The Studio Years 1928–1959 David Quinlan rated the film as "average", writing: "Uncomfortably improbable courtroom drama."

The Radio Times Guide to Films gave the film 3/5 stars, writing: "This is one of Dirk Bogarde's better movies from the 1950s, when critics of the time were hoisting him into the Alec Guinness class. Bringing a libel action to clear his name against the man who doubts if he really was the prisoner of war he claims to have been, Bogarde's role is the teasing centre of a clever narrative. The context is artificial, but it's Bogarde you'll be watching, not those on the sidelines. Compelling, if stagey."

Leslie Halliwell said: "Old-fashioned courtoom spelllbinder, quite adequately done though occasionally creaky."

== Accolades ==
The film was nominated for the Academy Award for Best Sound (A. W. Watkins).

The film was nominated by the American Film Institute for inclusion in its 10 Top 10 list in the category of courtroom drama.

== Adaptations ==
The Broadway play, which had starred Colin Clive, was adapted for radio in 1941 and 1943 using the original references to World War. Ronald Colman played the leading role in a one-hour 13 January 1941 CBS Lux Radio Theatre broadcast with Otto Kruger and Frances Robinson. On 15 March 1943, Colman and Kruger reprised their roles for a second Lux Radio Theatre broadcast. The role of an amnesiac World War I veteran had similarities to Colman's part in the 1942 hit Random Harvest.

A 1938 BBC television production featured actor Wyndham Goldie.
