= Woman to Woman (1947 film) =

1947 British film by Maclean Rogers

- Yvonne Arnaud, Adele Dixon and Joyce Howard
- Directed by: Maclean Rogers
- Written by: Marjorie Deans; James Seymour
- Based on: play Woman to Woman by Michael Morton
- Produced by: Louis H. Jackson
- Starring: Douglass Montgomery; Joyce Howard; Adele Dixon; Yvonne Arnaud
- Cinematography: James Wilson
- Edited by: Daniel Birt
- Music by: George Melachrino
- Production company: British National Films
- Distributed by: Anglo-American Film Corporation
- Release date: 10 February 1947
- Running time: 109 minutes
- Country: United Kingdom
- Language: English

Woman to Woman is a 1947 British drama film directed by Maclean Rogers and starring Douglass Montgomery, Joyce Howard and Adele Dixon. It is written by Michael Morton, Marjorie Deans and James Seymour based on Morton's 1921 play Woman to Woman, which was previously filmed in 1923 and 1929. A Canadian officer and a French dancer engage in a doomed romance.

== Plot ==
David Anson is young married Canadian officer who, shortly before being sent on a mission to parachute behind German lines, meets and falls in love with Parisian ballet dancer Nicolette Bonnett, with whom he has a child. His wife Sylvia refuses to grant him a divorce, but eventually agrees to adopt his son. Nicolette is diagnosed with a weak heart and advised to give up ballet. She nevertheless continues, knowing that her performance will be her last. When she dies, Anson returns to Paris, heartbroken.

== Cast ==
- Douglass Montgomery as David Anson
- Joyce Howard as Nicolette Bonnet
- Adele Dixon as Sylvia Anson
- Yvonne Arnaud as Henriette
- Paul Collins as David junior
- Eugene Deckers as De Rillac
- John Warwick as Dr Gavron
- Kay Young as Pauline
- Gerhard Kempinski as cafe proprietor
- Daisy Burrell as stage box committee
- Lily Kann as concierge
- Martin Miller as postman
- Marcel de Haes as hotel clerk
- Therese Carroll as bookstall woman
- Alan Sedgwick as John Meredith
- Agnes Bernelle as Lolo
- Charles Paton as pilot
- Finlay Currie as theatre manager
- George Carney as taxi driver
- Ralph Truman as Colonel
- Charles Victor as stage manager
- Daphne Day as Sylvia's friend
- Molly Raynor as Sylvia's friend
- Carol Coombe as Sylvia's secretary
- Carol Lawton as Sylvia's maid
- Griffiths Moss as Sylvia's butler

== Production ==
The film was shot at British National's Elstree Studios in June 1946.

The film's sets were designed by the art director Holmes Paul. It was given a German release in 1950.

== Reception ==
Variety wrote: "Fine popular entertainment, it could have achieved distinction had a little more care been taken with some of acting, notably that of Douglass Montgomery. His overplaying occasionally throws the whole thing out of balance."

The Monthly Film Bulletin wrote: "Competent acting plus dancing by the Ballet Rambert compensate for the heavily sentimental story and ponderous action. There is, however, a good musical score, including passages of Schubert, Chopin and Moussorgsky. Montgomery plays with his accustomed sincerity and Adele Dixon gives a perfectly tailored portrait of a ruthless, selfish society wife. But Yvonne Arnaud, in her brief sequences, is the only one who really imparts sparkle to a dull piece."

Kine Weekly wrote: "Lavishly mounted yet refreshingly intimate war-time triangle melodrama, a stylish, up-to-the-minute re-take of the huge earlier screen success. ... Of women and mainly for women, it is obviously destined to repeat history at a popular and provincial box-office. Excellent British tear-jerker. ... Not entirely beyond criticism – for one thing, it takes rather too long to get going, and for another, the hero's lone victories are so sweeping that many may wonder what the rest of the Army was doing – but its emotional angles and heart interest are sure fire."

Picture Show wrote: "Beautifully acted by Joyce Howard and Douglass Montgomery and told with sympathy and restraint, and presents some delightful ballet sequences."

The Daily Film Renter wrote: "To some degree it is encompassed by stage conventions, but it has feeling, style, and avoids the frowstiness of the traditional back-stage story between the soldier and the dancer which has become a convention. It owes its success in a considerable degree to the fresh, dewy acting of Joyce Howard as the dancer, the sincerity of Douglass Montgomery, and to an excellent supporting cast who make brilliant cameos of their character parts. ... The story is, of course, highly melodramatic, but there is no trace of crudeness in the love affair that results in an illegitimate son, while the meeting between the wife and the dancer is treated with commendable quietness."
