= The Demi-Paradise =

1943 British film by Anthony Asquith

- Theatrical release poster
- Directed by: Anthony Asquith
- Written by: Anatole de Grunwald
- Produced by: Filippo Del Giudice; Anatole de Grunwald
- Starring: Laurence Olivier; Margaret Rutherford; Felix Aylmer
- Cinematography: Bernard Knowles
- Edited by: Renee Woods
- Music by: Nicholas Brodszky
- Production company: Two Cities Films
- Distributed by: General Film Distributors
- Release date: 20 December 1943 (UK)
- Running time: 114 minutes
- Country: United Kingdom
- Language: English
- Budget: $800,000

The Demi-Paradise (also known as Adventure for Two) is a 1943 British comedy film directed by Anthony Asquith and starring Laurence Olivier and Penelope Dudley-Ward. It was written by Anatole de Grunwald, and produced by de Grunwald and Filippo Del Giudice.

The film's title is a reference to John of Gaunt's famous speech in Richard II which begins:

This royal throne of kings, this scepter'd isle,
This earth of majesty, this seat of Mars,
This other Eden, demi-paradise

== Plot summary ==
Ivan Kouznetsoff, a Russian inventor, travels to England to introduce the British shipping industry to his newly invented and improved propeller blade. There he meets socialite Anne Tisdall, and falls for her. Meeting Anne and hearing her views turn his own previous conceptions about the capitalist system and its degenerates upside down. After a lovers' quarrel, Ivan heads back to Russian only to be recalled to England a year later to smooth out imperfections in his design. Despite his efforts, his modifications prove to be unsound and he seems destined to return to the Soviet Union in disgrace.

Anne convinces the local shipbuilders to work around the clock in order to realise the revolutionary propeller. Soon they solve the problem, and there is a very successful launch of the new line of ships. Ivan can return to the Soviet Union to aid the war effort, enriched by Anne's love.

== Cast ==
- Laurence Olivier as Ivan Kouznetsoff
- Penelope Dudley-Ward as Ann Tisdall
- Marjorie Fielding as Mrs. Tisdall
- Margaret Rutherford as Rowena Ventnor
- Felix Aylmer as Mr. Runalow
- George Thorpe as Herbert Tisdall
- Leslie Henson as himself
- Guy Middleton as Dick Christian
- Michael Shepley as Mr. Walford
- Edie Martin as Miss Winifred Tisdall
- Muriel Aked as Mrs. Tisdall-Stanton
- Joyce Grenfell as Sybil Paulson
- Everley Gregg as Mrs. Flannel
- Jack Watling as Tom
- David Keir as Jordan
- Aubrey Mallalieu as Toomes, the butler
- Beatrice Harrison as herself
- Miles Malleson as theatre cashier
- John Laurie as wounded sailor
- Brian Nissen as George Tisdall
- George Cole as Percy
- Harry Fowler as evacuee
- Marie Ault as Mrs. Jones
- Gladys Henson as Mrs. Frost
- John Boxer as British sailor
- Alexis Chesnakov as Russian delegate
- Josephine Middleton as Mrs. Tremlow
- Margaret Withers as Mrs. Elliston
- Charles Paton as Mr. Bishop
- Wilfrid Hyde-White as nightclub waiter
- Mavis Clair as barmaid

== Production ==
The film was shot at Denham Studios with sets designed by the art director Carmen Dillon. The music score was by Nicholas Brodszky and the cinematography by Bernard Knowles.

== Reception ==
The Monthly Film Bulletin wrote: "Anthony Asquith, the Director, has made this an amusing if occasionally extravagant gibe at those English characteristics which always puzzle the foreigner. He has introduced many nice touches of direction, and, as always, he is most at home in his sense of the behaviour of the upper middle class. Laurence Olivier gives an admirable performance as the Russian, though whether his accent is authentic is open to doubt: at least, however, it has the merit of being thoroughly foreign."

Kine Weekly wrote: "Bright, brilliantly acted goodwill romantic comedy drama, based on a story by Anatole de Grunwald subtly fashioned in circumstances that enable English people to see themselves as the average foreigner sees them. In this instance the spectacles are worn by a young engineer from; Soviet Russia, played with incredible feeling, perception and flexibility by Laurence Olivier, and his observations and reactions, tabulated with a lofty determination to strengthen Anglo-Soviet relations, pattern into a thought-provoking, emotionally stimulating and, strangely enough, amusing and intensely patriotic screen play."

Variety wrote: "The Demi-Paradise runs five minutes less than two hours and its entertainment value would be improved by the deletion of half an hour or more. Most of it is narration, and from that angle is one of the finest scripts ever put out anywhere, its splendid satirical dialog poking amusingly and bitingly at the English."
