= The Doctor's Dilemma (film) =

1959 British film by Anthony Asquith

- U.S. theatrical poster
- Directed by: Anthony Asquith
- Written by: Anatole de Grunwald
- Based on: play by George Bernard Shaw
- Produced by: Anatole de Grunwald
- Starring: Leslie Caron; Dirk Bogarde; Alastair Sim; Robert Morley; Terence Alexander
- Cinematography: Robert Krasker
- Edited by: Gordon Hales
- Music by: Joseph Kosma
- Production companies: Metro-Goldwyn-Mayer British Studios; De Grunwald Productions
- Distributed by: Metro-Goldwyn-Mayer
- Release dates: 28 May 1959 (London); 17 December 1958 (NYC); January 1959 (USA)
- Running time: 99 minutes
- Country: United Kingdom
- Language: English
- Budget: $576,000
- Box office: $725,000

The Doctor's Dilemma is a 1958 British comedy-drama film directed by Anthony Asquith and starring Leslie Caron, Dirk Bogarde, Alastair Sim, and Robert Morley. It was written by Anatole de Grunwald based on the 1906 play The Doctor's Dilemma by George Bernard Shaw. A satire on the pretensions of the medical profession and their concentration on treating patients who can pay well, it contrasts their world of imperfect science, always bumping up against unknowns, with the boundless spheres of love and beauty.

== Plot ==
In London in 1906, some colleagues rush round to the Harley Street house of the unmarried Dr. Ridgeon to congratulate him on being awarded a knighthood for his claim that he can cure tuberculosis. Among them is Dr. Blenkinsop, who was at medical school with him, but now looks after poor patients who cannot afford to pay much, and is himself infected with tuberculosis. Waiting in his hall is the young and lovely Jennifer Dubedat who, having heard of his alleged cure, wants him to treat her husband Louis, a penniless artist. Struck by the beauty and charm of Jennifer, and by the quality of her husband's drawings which she shows him, he lets her believe he will try to save Louis, but stresses that his treatment is long and expensive, and that he can only handle ten patients at a time. So that he can meet Louis, and see more of Jennifer, he invites the two to a celebration dinner he is hosting that night.

While Louis is like his wife good-looking and charming, it emerges that he scorns all trappings of conventional morality, being a feckless liar, thief and seducer (a waitress recognises him as her vanished husband). Now highly doubtful about Louis, Ridgeon arranges with colleagues to visit the studio where he lives and assess his case. Recognising that his TB is far advanced, Ridgeon passes him on to a colleague and decides to take Blenkinsop instead. To Jennifer this is treachery and she begins to hate Ridgeon, while he hopes that he might marry her as soon as she is a widow. Beyond cure, Louis soon dies and in a moving last speech states his belief that love and beauty surpass all of conventional morality. He also begs Jennifer not to mourn, but to marry again and be happy.

In a postscript, Ridgeon attends the one-man exhibition of Louis' works, which are selling well. Jennifer refuses to let him buy a painting and leaves with her new husband.

== Cast ==
- Leslie Caron as Jennifer Dubedat
- Dirk Bogarde as Louis Dubedat
- Alastair Sim as Cutler Walpole
- Robert Morley as Sir Ralph Bloomfield Bonington
- John Robinson as Sir Colenso Ridgeon
- Felix Aylmer as Sir Patrick Cullen
- Michael Gwynn as Dr. Blenkinsop
- Maureen Delaney as Emmy
- Alec McCowen as Redpenny
- Colin Gordon as newspaper man
- Gwenda Ewen as Minnie Tinwell
- Terence Alexander as Mr. Lanchester
- Derek Prentice as head waiter
- Peter Sallis as art gallery secretary (Mr. Denby)
- Clifford Buckton as Butcher
- Mary Reynolds as Gwenda Ewen

== Production ==
Gabriel Pascal announced in 1946 he would make the film for Alexander Korda and starring Deborah Kerr. However, it was not made.

Anatole de Grunwald and Anthony Asquith had been developing a film about T. E. Lawrence to star Dirk Bogarde, but it was cancelled at the last minute. This film was offered to Bogarde as an alternative.

In the opening scene, there are two historical errors: Felix Aylmer is seen walking towards the Harley Street of Edwardian days; yet, on a distant wall behind him is a commemorative blue plaque; as he turns into the street, a George the VI letter box awaits him.

== Reception ==
=== Box office ===
The film was a success in the US, but not Britain. Bogarde later theorised this may have been due to the fact audiences were annoyed to discover the film was not one of the "Doctor" film series. However according to Kinematograph Weekly the film performed "better than average" at the British box office in 1959.

According to MGM records, the film only earned $275,000 in the US and Canada, and $450,000 elsewhere, resulting in a loss of $299,000.

=== Critical ===
The Monthly Film Bulletin wrote: "Shaw called his play a tragedy, and the main difficulty facing a director is to integrate its malicious satire on the medical profession with the ethical and human drama of Sir Colenso and the Dubedats. Asquith succeeds intermittently, while getting little help from de Grunwald's adaptation, whose every radical departure from Shaw has resulted in a weakening of the tension. ... Nevertheless Dirk Bogarde's Louis Dubedat is a genuine achievement, shorn of previous mannerisms and intelligently worked out. In fact he and Leslie Caron bring such warmth to the Dubedats, and John Robinson is so colourless as that vulnerable and misguided ass, Sir Colenso, that the balance of the argument is greatly endangered."

The Hollywood Reporter wrote: "Dirk Bogarde delivers a superb performance as the lovable bigamist and blackguard, Dubedat. Despite his amoral nature, the character conveys the conviction that he can make a woman supremely happy and it seems both reasonable and touching that his current wife (superbly played by Leslie Caron) should do everything in a wistful woman's power to persuade an eminent physician (enacted with poise and dignity by John Robinson) to save her husband from death by tuberculosis."

Variety wrote: "Bogarde gives a stimulating performance as the selfish young artist and is particularly convincing in his final, highly theatrical death sequence. Miss Caron is often moving in her blind belief in her man, but never suggests the strength necessary to fight the cynical doetors. These are played as caricatures. Producer Anatole de Grunwald has spared no expense in lining up a team which gives Shaw's lusty medicinal characters the works. John Robinson is suitably stiff-upper-lipped as the bachelor specialist who knows Bogarde's reputation and prefers to save another man, despite his liking for Miss Caron. Alastair Sim, Robert Morley and Felix Aylmer play the roles of Harley Street fuddy-duddies with rich fun and vigor."

Margarita Landazuri of Turner Classic Movies gave the film a positive review calling it a "sly of the 1906 morality play".
