= Moscow Nights (1935 film) =

- Directed by: Anthony Asquith
- Written by: Erich Seipmann; Anthony Asquith
- Based on: an unpublished novel by Pierre Benoît
- Produced by: Alexis Granowsky
- Starring: Laurence Olivier; Penelope Dudley-Ward; Harry Baur
- Cinematography: Philip Tannura
- Edited by: Francis D. Lyon
- Music by: Muir Mathieson
- Production companies: Denham Films; London Film Productions
- Distributed by: General Film Distributors
- Release date: 6 November 1935
- Running time: 100 minutes
- Country: United Kingdom
- Language: English

Moscow Nights (also known as Natacha; U.S. title: I Stand Condemned) is a 1935 British drama film directed by Anthony Asquith and starring Laurence Olivier, Penelope Dudley-Ward and Harry Baur. It was written by Erich Seipmann and Asquith, based on a novel by Pierre Benoit, and is a remake of the 1934 French film of the same title. Harry Baur was the only actor to reprise his role from the original. It was shot at Denham and Isleworth Studios, both controlled by Alexander Korda's London Films. The film's sets were designed by the art director Vincent Korda. It was released in the United States by United Artists.

The screenplay concerns a wounded officer who falls in love with his nurse.

== Plot ==
During the First World War, a wounded Russian officer, Captain Ignatoff, falls in love with his nurse. Matters are complicated by the fact that she is already engaged to a wealthy merchant.

== Cast ==
- Harry Baur as Brioukov
- Penelope Dudley-Ward as Natasha
- Laurence Olivier as Captain Ignatoff
- Athene Seyler as Madame Sabline
- Lilian Braithwaite as Countess
- Morton Selten as Kovrin
- Sam Livesey as Fedor
- Robert Cochran as Polonsky
- Hay Petrie as Spy
- Walter Hudd as the doctor
- Kate Cutler as Madame Kovrin
- C. M. Hallard as President of Court Martial
- Charles Carson as Officer of Defence
- Edmund Willard as Officer of Prosecution
- Morland Graham as Bioukov's servant

== Critical response ==
The Monthly Film Bulletin wrote: "Most of the atmosphere is markedly un-Russian, so that the praiseworthy foreignness of Harry Baur's performance actually seems out-of-place. The direction and editing are hovering and uncertain: the makers appear at a loss to construct adequately in terms of sound and dialogue and there are large awkward silent gaps in the action. Even where the cutting has concentrated directly on sound the effect is laboured and has too little relation to the internal movement of the film as a whole."

Variety wrote: "This [film] is a triumph for Anthony Asquith, director, in that you are actually transported to Russia in 1916, and no book could give you a more vivid spectacle of things as they existed at that time. In one moment you see the life of the people, then a flash of guns and then immediately switched to an interior, showing in no unmistakable manner two, three, or more simultaneous happenings in as many respective locales. The success of this development of plot is no accidental touch, but the result of skilful cutting. Its technique differs somewhat from anything seen before, and, as such, is most arresting."

Writing for The Spectator in 1935, Graham Greene called the film "completely bogus", and "the worst, as well as the most ballyhooed, film of the year". Asquith and Dudley-Ward were criticised in particular, with Greene describing Asquith's direction as puerile, and Dudley-Ward's acting as "country-house charades". Although Greene praised the acting from the rest of the film's stars, and noted that Asquith's past direction had been characterized by trickery, he commented that "now [Asquith's] bag of tricks seems empty".
