= Skalica =

- Municipality
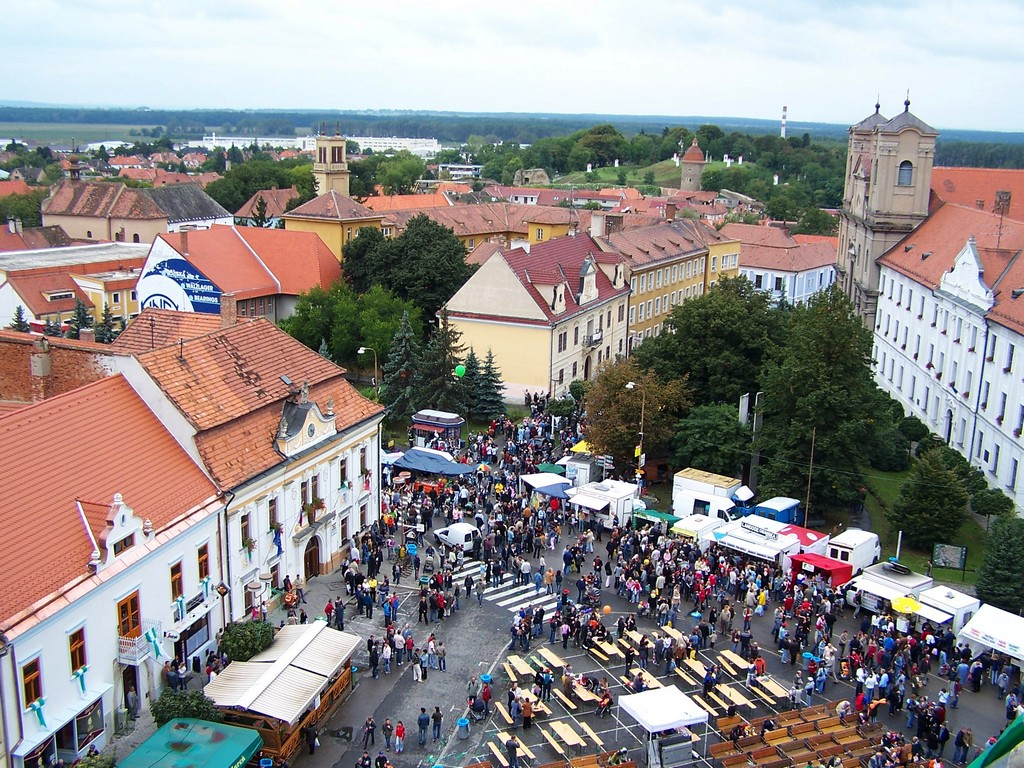
- City centre of Skalica

- Flag Coat of arms

- Location of Skalica in the Trnava Region Location of Skalica in Slovakia
- Coordinates: 48.84°N 17.23°E
- Country: Slovakia
- Region: Trnava Region
- District: Skalica District
- First mentioned: 1217

Government
  - Mayor: Oľga Luptáková

Area
  - Total: 59.77 km^{2} (23.08 sq mi)
- Elevation: 177 m (581 ft)

Population (2025)
  - Total: 15,358
- Time zone: UTC+1 (CET)
  - Summer (DST): UTC+2 (CEST)
- Postal code: 909 01
- Area code: +421 34
- Vehicle registration plate (until 2022): SI
- Website: www.skalica.sk

Skalica (German: Skalitz, Hungarian: Szakolca) is a town in Slovakia in western Slovakia in the Záhorie region. It's the largest town in Skalica District. Located near the Czech border, Skalica has a population of around 15,000.

== Geography ==
The municipality lies at an altitude of 177 metres (581 ft) and covers an area of 59.77 km^{2} (23.08 sq mi) (2025).

== Etymology ==
The name is derived from Slovak word skala (a rock) referring to the cliffs the inhabitants built their settlement over. The first written record of Skalica was made in 1217 as Szacholca.

== History ==
The site has been inhabited since 4000 BC and was part of the Great Moravian Empire. From the second half of the 10th century until 1918, it was part of the Kingdom of Hungary. The settlement developed around a triangular plaza, which was rare during the Middle Ages. Its town privileges were conferred in 1372 by King Louis I of Hungary. In 1428, Skalica became a bastion for the Hussites; during the Hussite Wars, the majority of its then predominantly German-speaking populace fled or was exiled. Many Habaners (adherents of a sect similar to Anabaptism) settled in Skalica in the 16th century.

On 6 November 1918, Skalica became the seat of the Temporary Government of Slovakia, for ten days de facto capital of Slovakia. The Temporary Government led by Vavro Šrobár declared here the sovereignty of the Czechoslovak state, published a newspaper Sloboda (Liberty), and unsuccessfully tried to negotiate the removal of Hungarian troops from Upper Hungary (today Slovakia).

After World War II, the town tried to take advantage of its position as a district town, and many new works, schools, and apartment blocks were built, while successfully preserving its historical city centre. In 1960, Skalica became part of the Senica district. This lasted until 1996, when Skalica became a separate district again.

Didaktik computers were produced in Skalica during the 1980s. The 2006 European Table Hockey Championships were held in the town.

A popular pastry called trdelník is made in Skalica. Now sold all over Slovakia and Czechia, this unusual "stove-pipe" shaped pastry has its origins in Transylvania.

Today, it is economically the strongest town in the Záhorie region, bypassing its rival town Senica for this position, and is becoming a tourist destination thanks to its preserved town centre and historical monuments.

== Sights ==
Near the remnants of one of Skalica's city walls is one of Slovakia's oldest works of construction, the Romanesque Rotunda of St. George. Although its exact date of origin is unknown, it was constructed by the 12th century at the latest. A Baroque dome was attached to it in the 17th century. The city has several churches, including a Jesuit church and monastery, the 15th-century Parish Church of St. Michael, and the 15th-century Franciscan church and monastery. Other sights are Skalica's Late Renaissance town hall and the Skalica Culture House built in the Art Nouveau with elements of Czech and Slovak folklore.

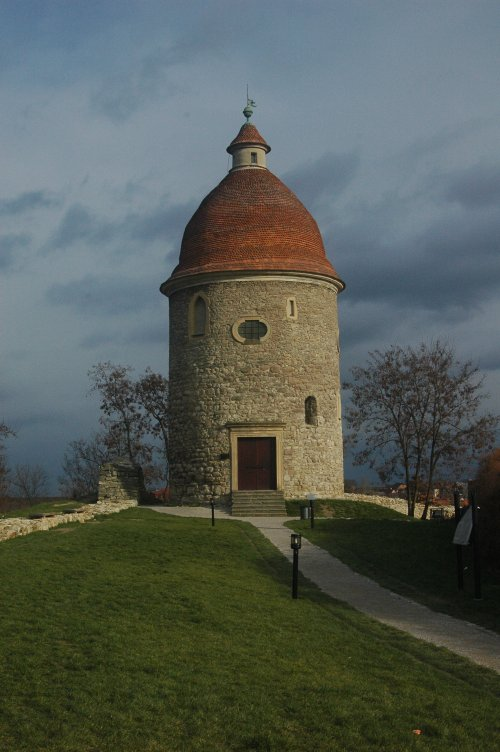
The Romanesque St. George rotunda is the oldest building in the town

== Population ==
Historical population
Year	Pop.	±%
1970	9,637	—
1980	13,833	+43.5%
1991	14,748	+6.6%
2001	15,013	+1.8%
2011	14,441	−3.8%
2021	15,573	+7.8%
Source: Censuses

Population statistic (10 years)
Year	1995	2005	2015	2025
Count	14,999	14,963	14,806	15,358
Difference		−0.24%	−1.04%	+3.72%

Population statistic
Year	2024	2025
Count	15,440	15,358
Difference		−0.53%

It has a population of 15,358 people (31 December 2025).

=== Ethnicity ===
Census 2021 (1+ %)
Ethnicity	Number	Fraction
Slovak	13,963	89.66%
Not found out	1344	8.63%
Czech	479	3.07%
Total	15,573	

In year 2021 was 15,573 people by ethnicity 13,963 as Slovak, 1344 as Not found out, 479 as Czech, 73 as Romani, 63 as Other, 30 as Moravian, 26 as Hungarian, 16 as Ukrainian, 14 as Romanian, 10 as Vietnamese, 9 as Rusyn, 9 as Russian, 9 as German, 5 as Austrian, 3 as Jewish, 3 as Silesian, 3 as Polish, 3 as English, 2 as Irish, 2 as Italian, 2 as French, 2 as Croatian, 1 as Turkish, 1 as Serbian, 1 as Canadian and 1 as Albanian.

Note on population: The difference values of population numbers in the table "Population statistic" and in the sections "Ethnicity" & "Religion" is caused by the use of various statistical methods.

=== Religion ===
Census 2021 (1+ %)
Religion	Number	Fraction
Roman Catholic Church	7888	50.65%
None	5098	32.74%
Not found out	1469	9.43%
Evangelical Church	735	4.72%
Total	15,573	

In year 2021 was 15,573 people by religion 7888 from Roman Catholic Church, 5098 from None, 1469 from Not found out, 735 from Evangelical Church, 94 from Greek Catholic Church, 60 from Ad hoc movements, 37 from Christian Congregations in Slovakia, 35 from Other, 34 from Eastern Orthodox Church, 25 from Other and not ascertained christian church, 15 from Buddhism, 14 from United Methodist Church, 12 from Calvinist Church, 12 from Paganism and natural spirituality, 11 from Jehovah's Witnesses, 9 from Islam, 5 from Czechoslovak Hussite Church, 4 from Hinduism, 4 from Seventh-day Adventist Church, 3 from Jewish community, 3 from Church of Jesus Christ of Latter-day Saints, 3 from Apostolic Church, 1 from Old Catholic Church, 1 from New Apostolic Church and 1 from Baptists Church.

== Sports ==
- HK 36 Skalica, ice hockey club from the town and MFK Skalica, football club in the Slovak Super Liga.
- ŠK Bandy hokej Skalica is one of three bandy clubs in Slovakia. In 2019 it won the rink bandy league.

== Notable people ==
- Béla II of Hungary (c.1109–1141), king of Hungary
- Sebastián Čederle (born 2000), ice hockey player
- János Csernoch (1852–1927), primate of Hungary
- Ján Hollý (1785–1849), poet, studied in Skalica
- Gyula Juhász (1883–1937), poet
- Miroslav Jureňa (born 1954), politician
- Radoslav Malenovský (born 1986), sports shooter
- Milan Mišík (1928–2011), geologist, university professor
- Žigmund Pálffy (born 1972), ice hockey player
- Dobroslav Trnka (1963-2023), lawyer
- Marián Varga (1947–2017), musician
- František Krištof Veselý (1903–1977), actor and singer
- Miroslav Zálešák (born 1980), ice hockey player

== Twin towns — sister cities ==
Skalica is twinned with:

- Schwechat, Austria
- Freyburg, Germany
- Gladbeck, Germany
- Strážnice, Czech Republic
- Uherské Hradiště, Czech Republic
- Slaný, Czech Republic
- Arcueil, France

== Gallery ==
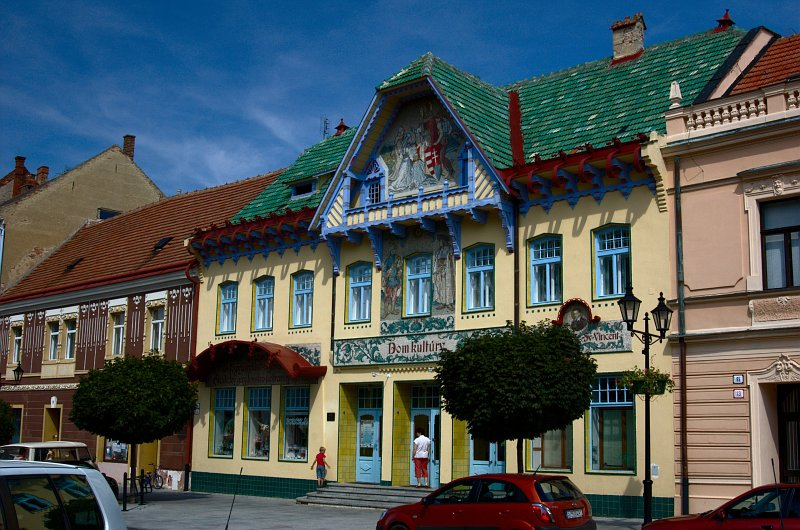
Culture house

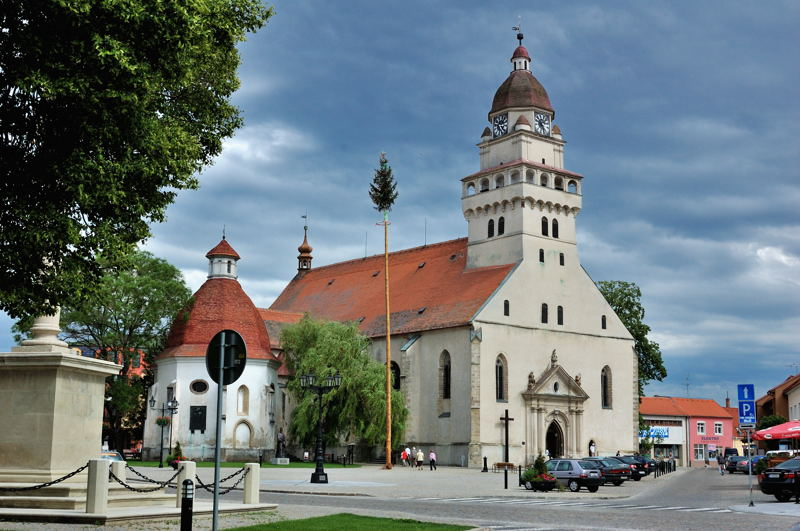
Main square

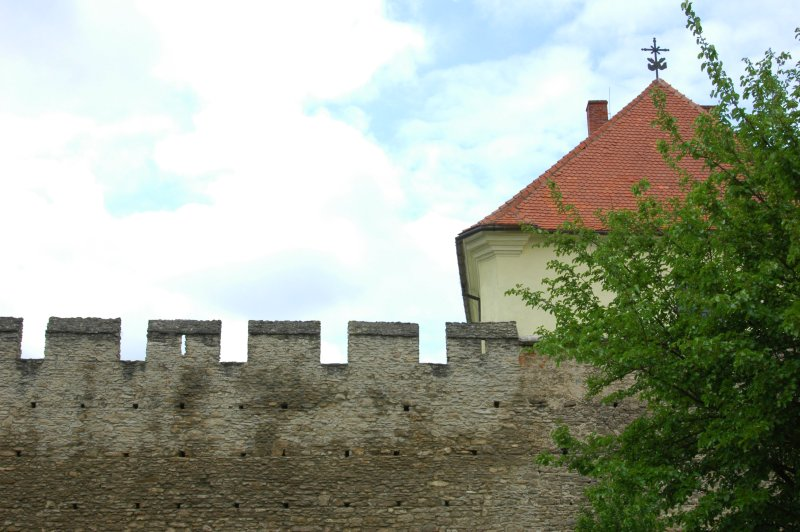
City walls

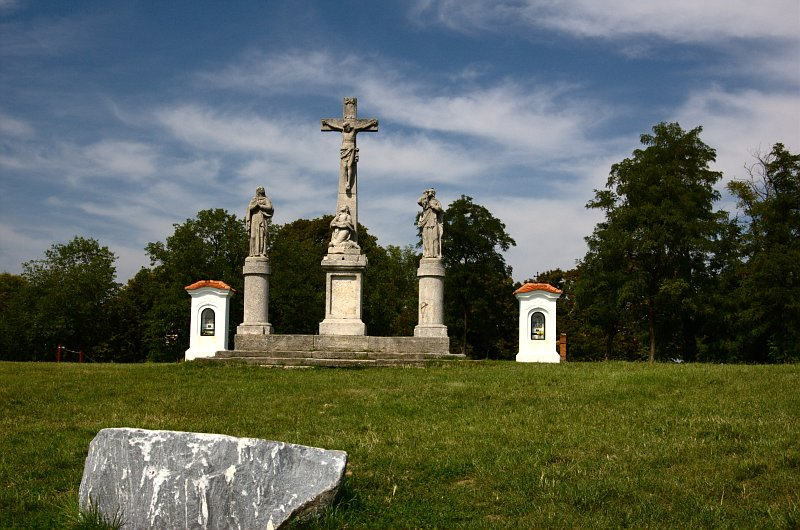
Calvary

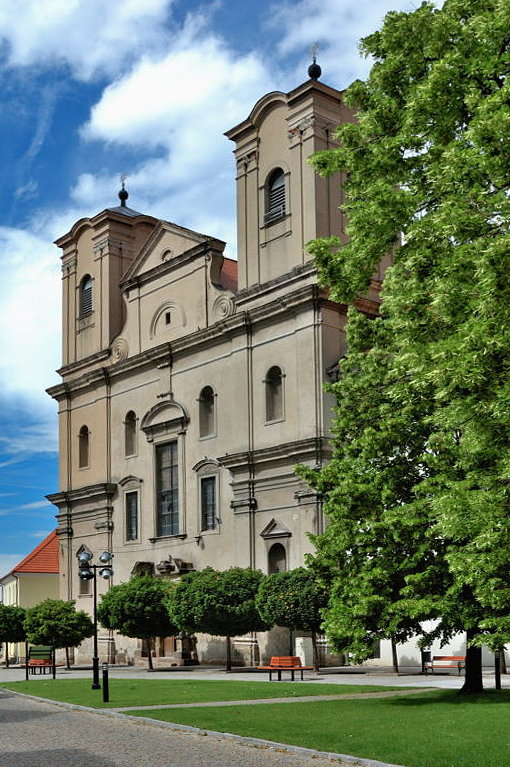
Jesuit church

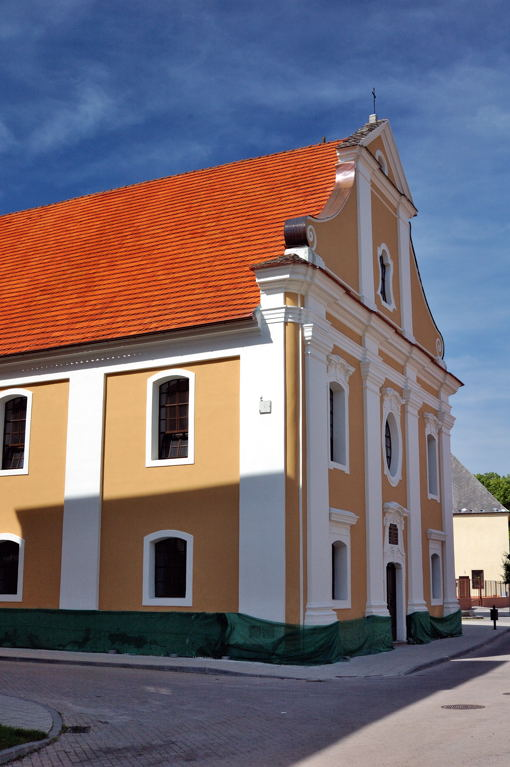
Lutheran church

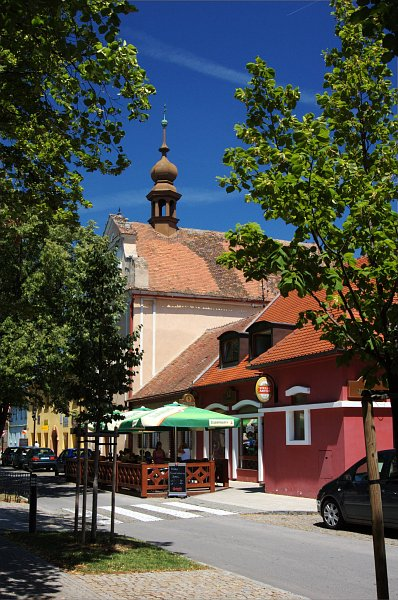
Pauline monastery

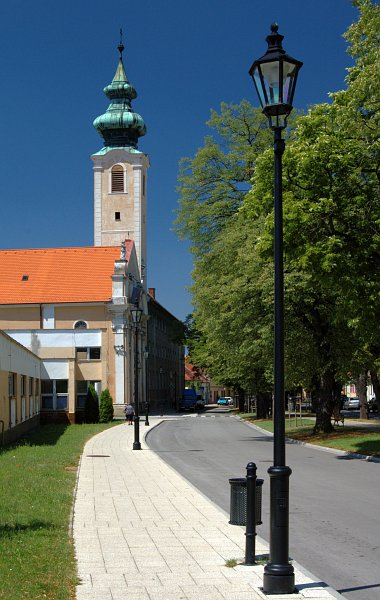
Trinity church

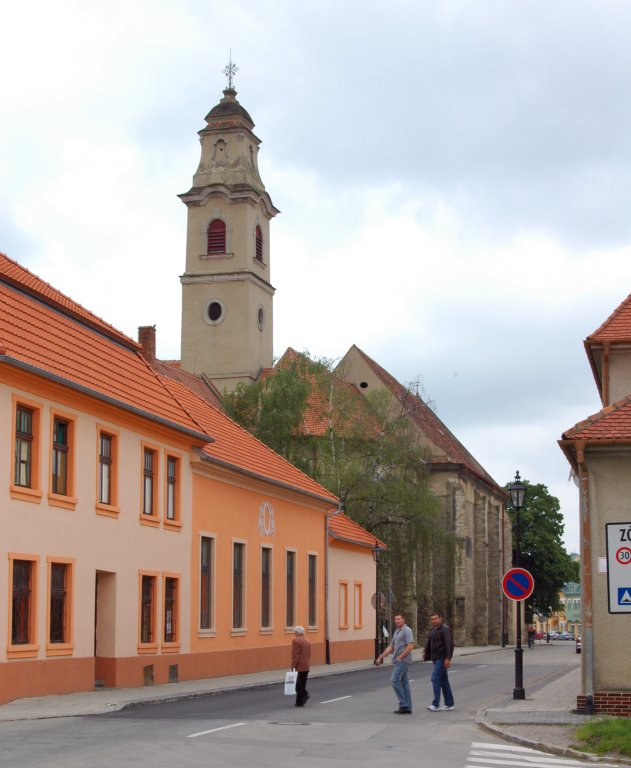
Franciscan monastery

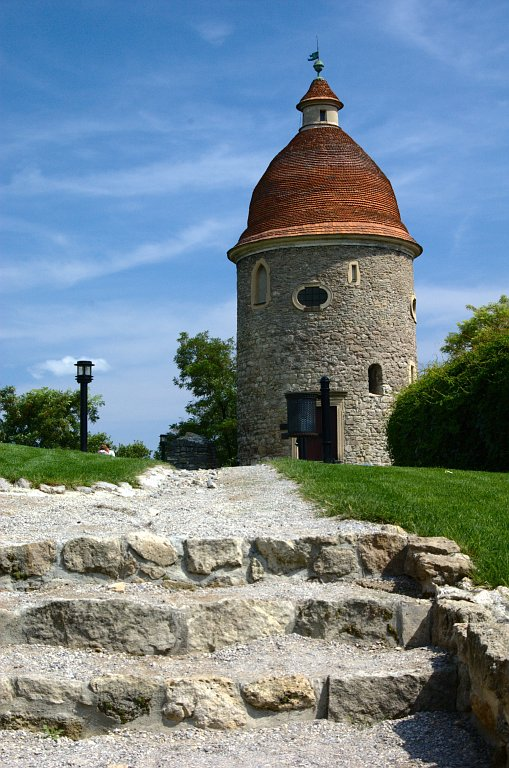
Romanesque rotunda

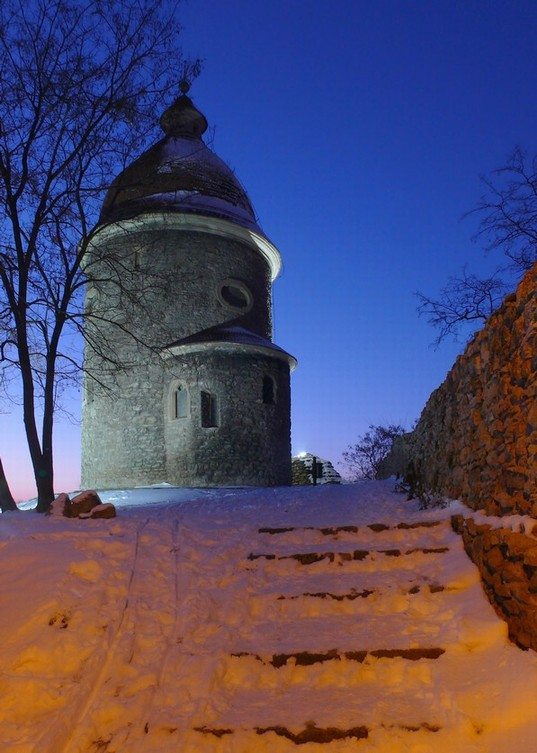
Rotunda at night

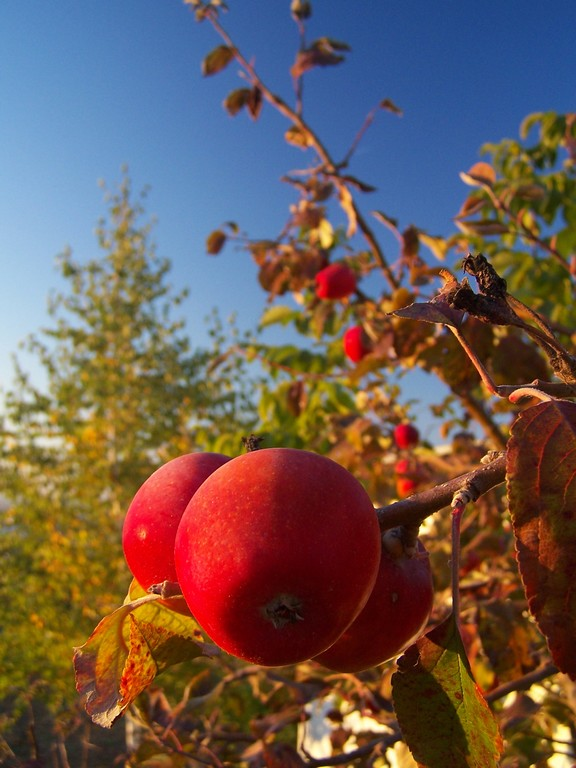
Garden in Skalica

== See also ==
- List of municipalities and towns in Slovakia
