= František Krištof Veselý =

Slovak actor, presenter, director and singer (1903–1977)

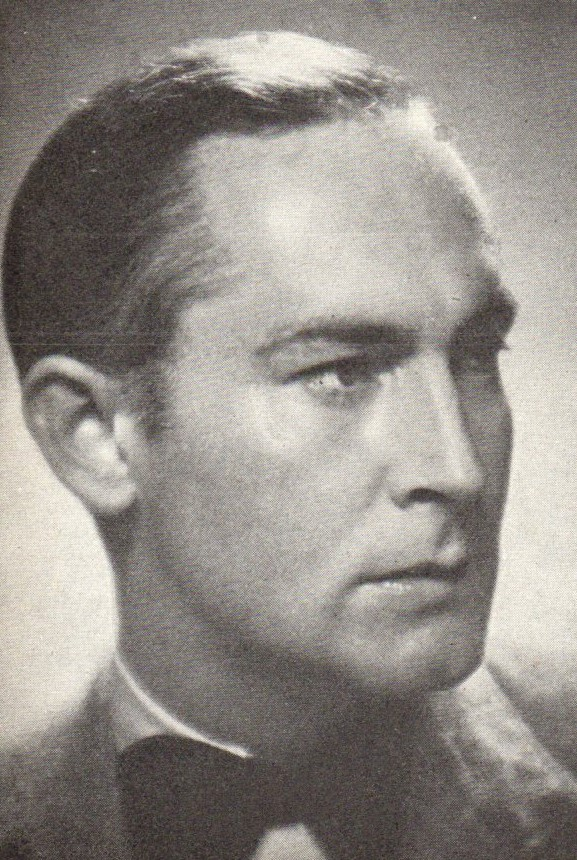
- František Krištof Veselý, 1937
- Born: 12 February 1903; Skalica, Kingdom of Hungary, Austro-Hungarian Empire
- Died: 13 March 1977 (aged 74); Bratislava, Czechoslovakia
- Other name: Frantisek Veselý
- Occupation: Actor
- Years active: 1936–1965 (Film)

František Krištof Veselý (1903–1977) was a Slovak theatre and movie actor and singer.

== Selected filmography ==
- Delightful Story (Rozkošný příběh, 1936)
- Country Girl (Děvčátko z venkova, 1937)
- Honeymoon Journey (Svatební cesta, 1938)
- The Reluctant Grandfather (Dědečkem proti své vůli, 1939)

== Bibliography ==
- Stanislav J. Kirschbaum. The A to Z of Slovakia. Rowman & Littlefield, 2010.
