= Delightful Story =

- Directed by: Vladimír Slavínský
- Written by: Karel Melísek (operetta); Jaroslav Mottl; Vladimír Slavínský
- Produced by: Josef Stein
- Starring: Věra Ferbasová; Zita Kabátová; Frantisek Kristof-Veselý
- Cinematography: Jan Roth
- Edited by: Antonín Zelenka
- Music by: Josef Stelibský
- Production company: Slavia Film
- Distributed by: Slavia Film
- Release date: 1936
- Country: Czechoslovakia
- Language: Czech

Delightful Story (Czech: Rozkosný príbeh) is a 1936 Czech operetta film directed by Vladimír Slavínský and starring Věra Ferbasová, Zita Kabátová and Frantisek Kristof-Veselý.

The film's sets were designed by the art director Štěpán Kopecký.

== Cast ==
- Věra Ferbasová as Helena Veselá
- Zita Kabátová as Miluska Kovárová
- František Kristof-Veselý as JUDr. Jára Nerad
- Oldřich Nový as Jaroslav Nerad
- Růžena Šlemrová as Ema Neradová
- Jan Pivec as Karel Dobes
- Theodor Pistek as Ferdinand Nerad
- Ladislav Pešek as Ferdinand Nerad
- Stanislav Neumann as Fred Penkava
- Adina Mandlová as Eva Randová
- Baletni Soubor Tylova Divadla as Dancers
- Julius Batha as Bookkeeper
- Josef Fuksa as Dancer
- Milada Gampeová as Eva's Mother
- Jiří Hron as Customer
- Iska Kostalova as Dancer
- Oldřich Kovár as Singer
- František Krejci as Porter
- Ota Motycka as Nerad's Servant
- Alois Peterka as Shopkeeper
- A. Pilsova
- Slávka Procházková as Singer
- Marie Ptáková
- Selteri as Singer
- Bozena Stehlickova as Saleswoman
- L. Stolcova
- Vladimír Stros as First Customer
- Elsa Vetesníková as Bozenka

== Bibliography ==
- Vladimír Opěla. Czech feature film, Volume 2. Národní filmový archiv, 1998.
