= English Without Tears =

1944 British film by Harold French

- Opening title card
- Directed by: Harold French
- Written by: Terence Rattigan; Anatole de Grunwald
- Produced by: Anatole de Grunwald
- Starring: Michael Wilding; Penelope Dudley-Ward; Lilli Palmer
- Cinematography: Bernard Knowles
- Edited by: Alan Jaggs
- Music by: Nicholas Brodszky
- Production company: Two Cities Films
- Distributed by: General Film Distributors, England
- Release dates: 28 July 1944 (London, England)
- Running time: 89 minutes
- Country: England
- Language: English

English Without Tears is a 1944 British romantic comedy film directed by Harold French and starring Michael Wilding, Penelope Dudley-Ward and Lilli Palmer. The screenplay was by Terrance Rattigan and Anatole de Grunwald. It was released in the U.S. under the title Her Man Gilbey, as a reference to the classic Screwball comedy, My Man Godfrey (1936).

The film depicts the romance between a young English aristocrat and her family's butler. During World War II, the butler becomes an officer of the Royal Army Service Corps and the girl joins the Auxiliary Territorial Service. Their change in status and her maturity affect their relationship. The world around them is also transformed.

== Plot ==
In July 1939, the top-hatted deliveryman from a Fortune and Weedon carriage takes a basket of quail to the tradesman's entrance of Beauclerk House. An elaborate process brings the birds to the dinner plates of Lady Christabel Beauclerk and her nephew, Sir Cosmo Brandon, a British delegate to the League of Nations in Geneva. A fanatical bird expert, Lady Christobel identifies the "quail" as a thrush and sends the "tortured friend" away in horror. She commands third-generation butler Tom Gilbey to join them in Geneva, where she will propose sanctuaries for British birds. The xenophobic Gilbey almost quits, but his father and grandfather tell him it is his duty. Home from school, Lady Christobel's niece, Joan Heseltine, talks about equality with the butler, on whom she has a longstanding crush.

In Geneva, the party meets Polish political cartoonist Felix Dembowski and French romantic novelist François de Freycinet. The session and Norwegian interpreter Brigid Knudsen's translations provide a dose of dark humour.

Lady Christabel's outraged demands for sanctuaries and control of oil pollution are perceived as an attempt at British imperial expansion. One delegate engages Knudsen to find out more by vamping an oblivious Gilbey. A "romantic" row on the lake ends with Gilbey's appearance carrying a soaking Bridgid. The family speculates but ignores the issue. Joan springs to his defense – and tells them that she will love him forever.

2 October 1939. War has begun. Gilbey leaves to join the Territorial Army. Misled by Bonnie, Joan declares her love in a nearby tea shop. Citing her youth and class distinctions, he tells her it is hopeless. She refuses to give up. In May 1940, refugee Knudsen serendipitously encounters De Freycinet at the train station. Beauclerk House is The Sanctuary, housing European Allied officers. Gilbey, now a second lieutenant in the RASC, returns home to find Lady Christabel happily occupying his old room. He asks, hopefully after the rest of the family, and finds a mature, confident Joan teaching English to a large class of officers. At the tea shop, he explains how he has changed. He is now in love with her... Joan no longer loves him. He was "cold and inhuman and godlike", and she knows hundreds of second lieutenants just like him.

Meanwhile, De Freycinet asks Brandon to get Knudsen a legitimate passport. Brandon assists, assuming, wrongly, that De Freycinet and Knudsen are lovers. At The Sanctuary, Gilbey gets advice on seduction from several officers, but he makes an awkward mess of putting it to use. De Freycinet and Dembowski vie for Joan's affections by trying to be her top pupil, taking extra lessons from Knudsen. Lady Christobel approves of De Freycinet's suit.

De Freycinet asks Brandon for another endorsement so Knudsen can join the Free Norwegian Forces. Brandon sends Gilbey to her apartment to confirm his belief that De Freycinet is her lover. Dembowski, De Freycinet and Joan arrive; the misunderstanding escalates; and Joan storms out. The three men plan to confront her, but cowardice prevails and at The Sanctuary's bar they drunkenly make up their differences and swear off women. Joan overhears and gives up on men. On 18 September 1940, she joins the Auxiliary Territorial Service. In December 1942 she is assigned to a notorious RASC major who ran through 6 typists in a month. It is Gilbey, now brusque, rude, demanding and intolerant, insisting that a staff member who has just given birth return to work. He tells an aide to get Joan a job she can do. In tears, she tells a sympathetic corporal that he is "wonderful".

On his bicycle, a top-hatted Fortune and Weedon man delivers a basket of canned spam to Beauclerk House for the New Year's Eve United Nations Dance, where several of the film's couples come together. Tom and Joan "argue" about his being "out of reach." He presses her against a pillar, and they kiss. Cut to the just-married couple running down the steps to the cheers of friends and family. Joan's new job: Gilbey's driver. "I endeavor to give every satisfaction," she declares, saluting him.

== Cast ==
- Michael Wilding as Tom Gilbey
- Penelope Dudley-Ward as Joan Heseltine
- Lilli Palmer as Brigid Knudsen
- Claude Dauphin as François de Freycinet
- Albert Lieven as Felix Dembowski
- Peggy Cummins as Bobbie Heseltine
- Margaret Rutherford as Lady Christabel Beauclerk
- Martin Miller as Schmidt
- Roland Culver as Sir Cosmo Brandon
- Paul Demel as M. Saladoff
- Beryl Measor as Miss Faljambe
- Guy Middleton as Captain Standish
- Esma Cannon as Queenie
- Ivor Barnard as Mr. Quiel
- Paul Bonifas as Monsieur Rolland
- Richard Turner as delivery man
- Gordon Begg as Grandfather Gilbey
- Felix Aylmer as Mr Spaggot
- Judith Furse as Elise Batter-Jones
- André Randall as Dutch officer
- Gerard Heinz as Polish officer
- Irene Handl as Delegate (uncredited)

== Production ==
Harold French had directed the successful stage production of French without Tears starring Rex Harrison. He later called the film:

A bit of wickedness on Tolly de Grunwald's part because it wasn't good and made no real sense. Tolly, who was a lovely old villain, had found a backer and her persuaded Terry to lend his name to it. And of course Terry, who was then in the Air Force, needed the money. By the time we were shooting, I knew it wasn't Terry's dialogue. Penelope Dudley Ward was in it and she had a lovely comedy sense with a very light touch.

== Critical reception ==
The Monthly Film Bulletin wrote: "Terence Rattigan and Anatole de Grunwald have produced here a subtle comedy of manners truly in the tradition which reached scintillating heights with Frederick Lonsdale's plays. Clive Brook's brilliant translation of one of those plays (On Approval) to the screen is likely to form a stiff measure for anything else in the same class for some time to come. This piece nevertheless is gay and charming, caricaturing with tolerant incisiveness the classes of English people who used to impress or exasperate most foreigners and amuse or exasperate their fellow-countrymen. Polished acting contributes much to this success. Margaret Rutherford as Lady Beauclerk and Roland Culver as her Foreign Office nephew contribute most, but there are efficient performances from Michael Wilding, Penelope Ward, Lilli Palmer and others. Generous work by the production department has been well used by director and cameramen to create a pre-war spaciousness in the sets."

The Glasgow Herald felt the film suffered in comparison to Rattigan and de Grunwald's previous success, French Without Tears, and regretted the absence of director Anthony Asquith's "light, witty touch". The reviewer wrote that Wilding "(is) pleasant as the embodiment of the joke and Penelope Ward is charming as the trimmings to it. Roland Culver is beautifully suave in a small part, and Margaret Rutherford has a nice bit of philanthropic lunacy to do".

Variety wrote that despite "admirable direction and excellent photography, the story ambles along to no definite denouement. Therefore it's not a strong candidate for the American market. Smart dialog and witticisms galore are not sufficient to sustain so elemental a love story."
