= Ryba na suchu =

- Directed by: Vladimír Slavínský
- Starring: Vlasta Burian; Vítezslav Vejrazka
- Release date: 11 September 1942
- Running time: 85 minute
- Country: Czechoslovakia
- Language: Czech

Ryba na suchu is a 1942 Czech comedy film directed by Vladimír Slavínský.

== Cast ==
- Vlasta Burian – Frantisek Ryba
- Vítězslav Vejražka – Ing. Frantisek Pánek
- Jaroslav Marvan – Jaroslav Horánek, starosta
- Václav Trégl – Tichý, penzista
- Zdeňka Baldová – Starostova zena
- Rudolf Deyl – Professor
- Josef Gruss (actor) – Vodicka, úcetní
- Helena Bušová – Bozenka, hostinská
- František Filipovský – Rypácek, radní
- Vladimír Řepa – Hoblík, radní
