= Vladimír Slavínský =

Czech film director

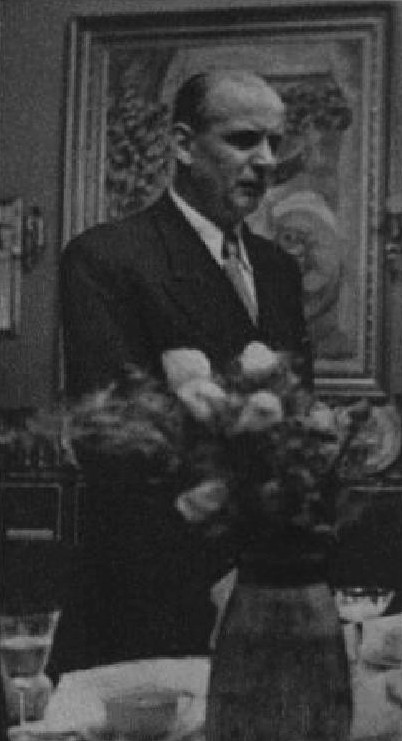
- Born: 26 September 1890; Dolní Štěpánice, Royal Bohemia, Austro-Hungarian Empire
- Died: 16 August 1949 (aged 58); Prague, Czechoslovakia
- Other name: Otto Pittermann
- Occupations: Film director screenwriter actor
- Years active: 1919–1949
- Spouse: Lída Slavínská

Vladimír Slavínský (26 September 1890 – 16 August 1949) was a Czech film director, screenwriter and actor.

== Life ==
Vladimír Slavínský was born Otakar Vladimír Pitrman in Dolní Štěpánice, on 26 September 1890. Since his youth he acted in amateur theatres while working as a typesetter. In 1912 he wrote his first two screenplays. After World War I he co-founded a production company Pojafilm with Alois Jalovec and started directing. He directed mostly sentimental dramas and comedy films, which were very commercially successful at the time. He died in Prague on 16 August 1949.

== Selected filmography ==
=== Director ===
- The Son of the Mountains (1925)
- The Little Window (1933)
- Three Men in the Snow (1936)
- Delightful Story (1936)
- The Minister's Girlfriend (1940)
- Lawyer of the Poor (1941)
- Chalk and Cheese (1941)
- Fish Out of Water (1942)
- Seine beste Rolle (1944), Nazi German film
- Just Getting Started (1946)
- The Last of the Mohicans (1947)
- No Surgery Hours Today (1948)
