= Rotunda of St. George, Skalica =

Chapel in Skalica

Rotunda of St. George
- Rotunda svätého Juraja
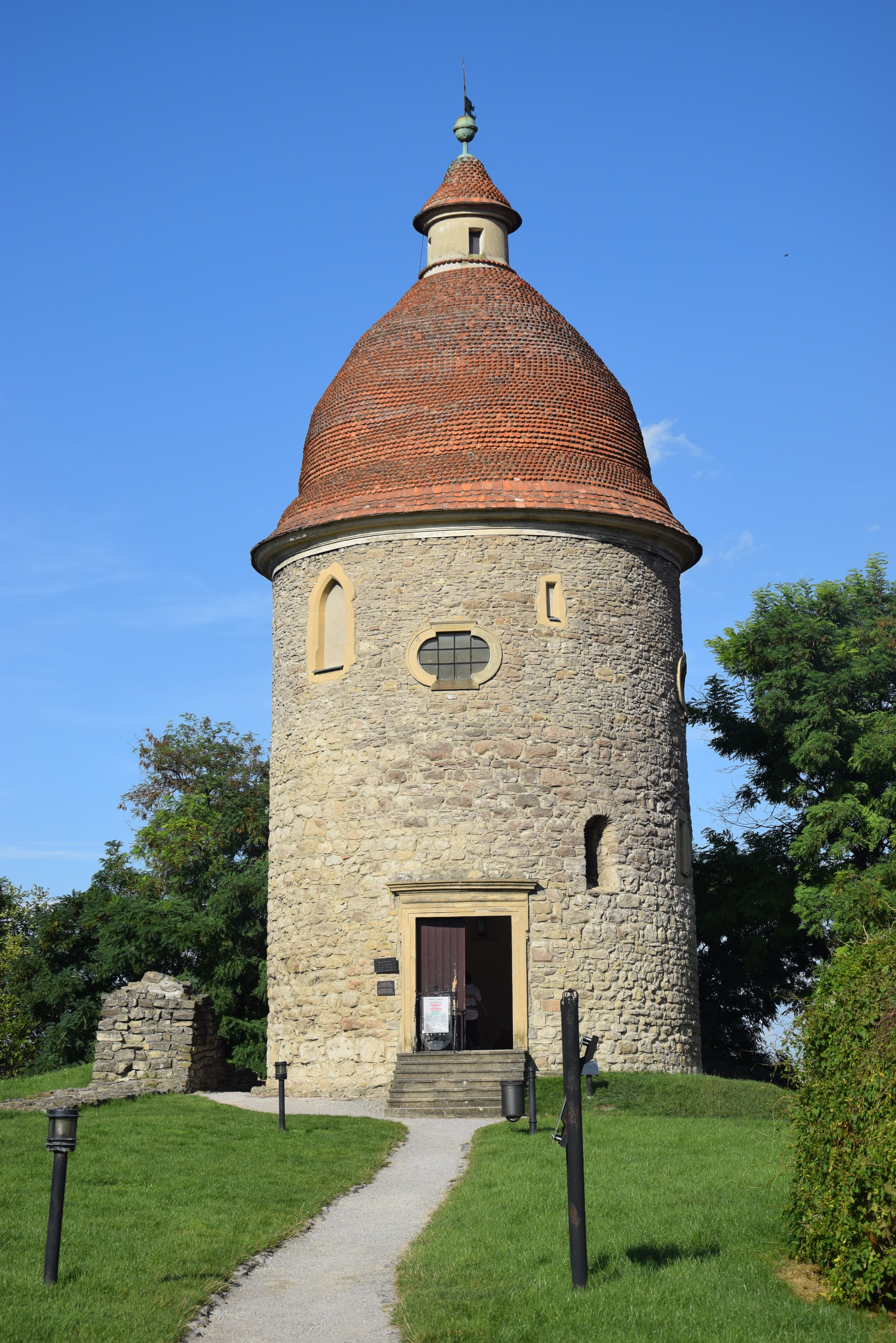
- Rotunda of St. George
- 48.848483°N 17.225411°E
- Location: Skalica, Slovakia

The Rotunda of St. George (Slovak: Rotunda svätého Juraja) also known as the Chapel of St. George is a rotunda building built in the early Romanesque style, probably in the 11th century. It was later rebuilt in the Gothic and Baroque styles. The Rotunda is considered a symbol of Skalica.

Field inspections and subsequent archaeological research, which took place here in 1974, 1976-1980, showed that the Rontuda of St. George was built in the early Middle Ages and that the width of the walls, the circular nave and the horseshoe-shaped apse are completely identical in size to the rotunda in Ducové.

The exact date of the rotunda's construction is not yet known. Its architecture follows the type of Bohemian and Moravian rotundas and, together with historical circumstances, suggests that its construction dates back to the end of the 10th century or the beginning of the 11th century.

== History ==
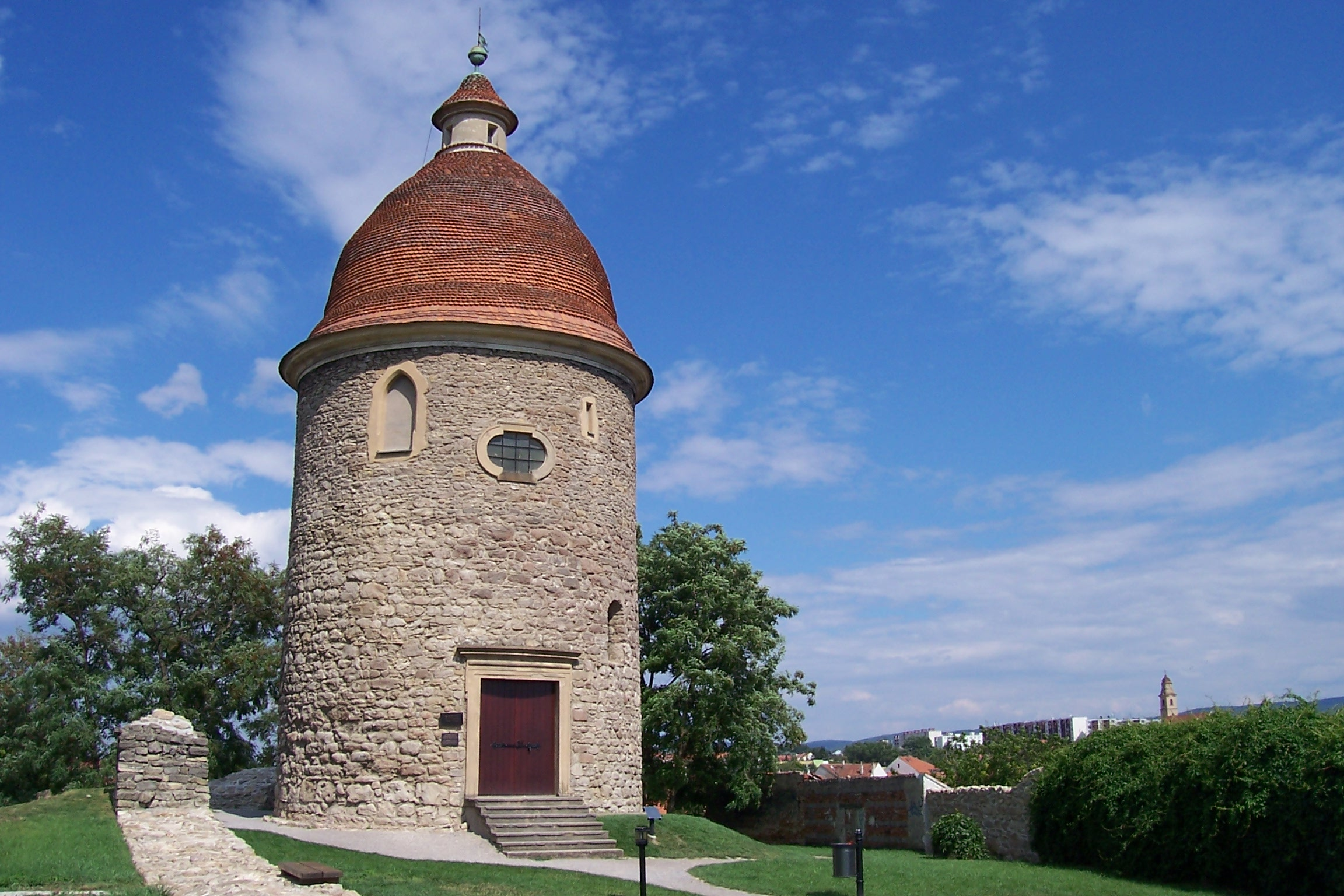
In 2007.

The Rotunda of St. George is the oldest historical and architectural monument in Skalica. It was originally intended for use as a chapel. The rotunda served as a private church with a small burial area. It is a central circular building, extended by a horseshoe-shaped apse, has a Baroque dome with a lantern, its apse with a conch remained in its original Romanesque form. On the outside of the apse there are traces of two Romanesque windows. The masonry consists of smaller sandstone blocks. Originally, it was built lower with a flat roof. In 1372, the walls were built, which created one of the towns's defensive lines. The second line was a moat with water, which was created by digging a ditch around Skalica. When building the moat, the hill on which the rotunda stood was dug up, creating two separate hills. After the walls were completed, the rotunda was raised to its current height, with the lower part continuing to serve as a chapel and the upper part having a defensive function. In 1650, a dome with a lantern was built and a crypt was built in the center of the rotunda. In 1945, the rotunda was damaged during World War II. Repairs were carried out in 1949, when the rotunda acquired its current appearance - the external plaster was removed. In 1970, after it was declared a national cultural monument, archaeological, restoration and art historical research was carried out. In 1996, the wall frescoes were restored. In 2002, the Slovak Post issued a stamp with the theme of the building. The dome of the rotunda underwent reconstruction in 2017, which the city repaired as part of the Zrekonštruujte si domov project.

== Description ==
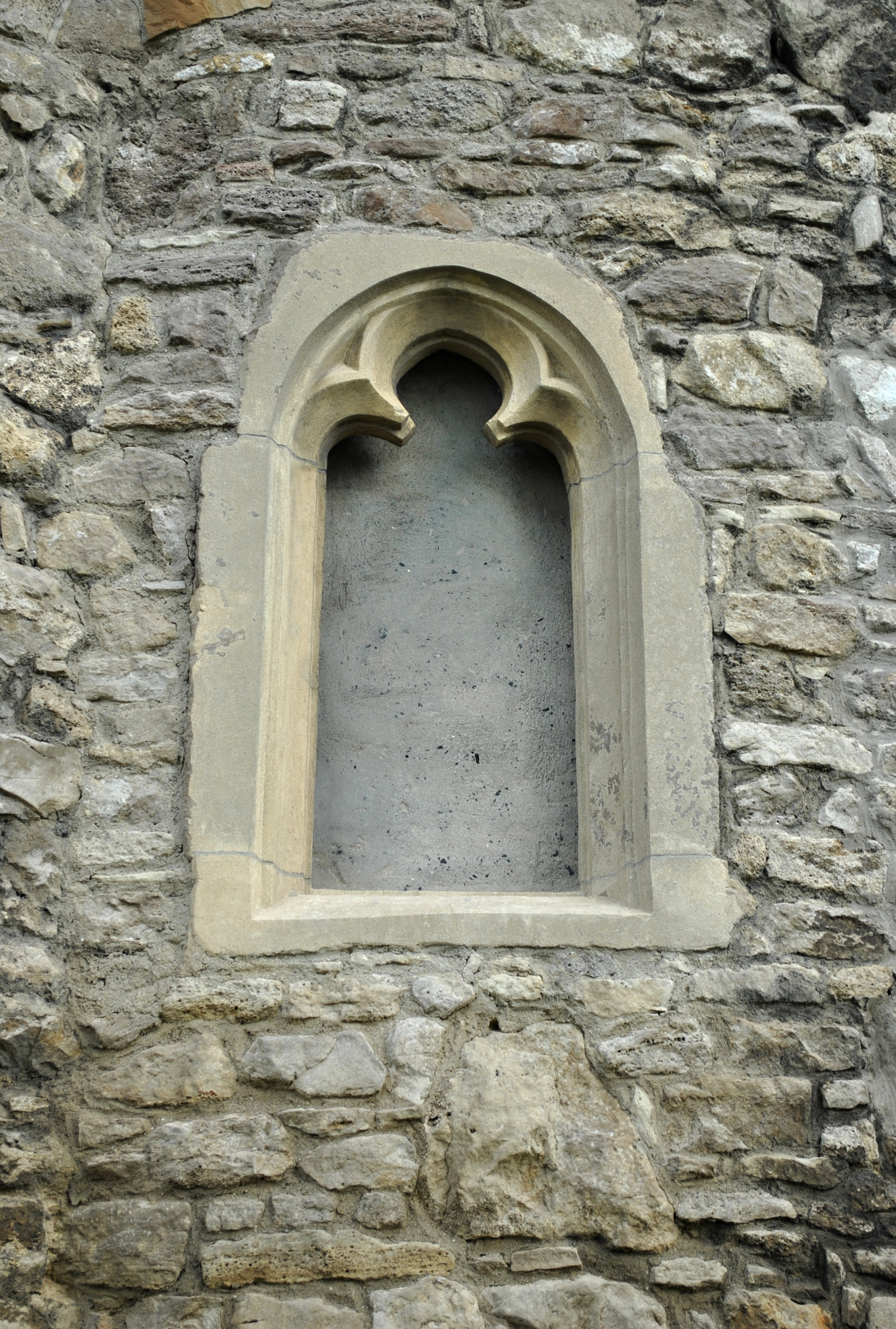
Romanesque window of the Skalica Rotunda.

=== Paintings ===
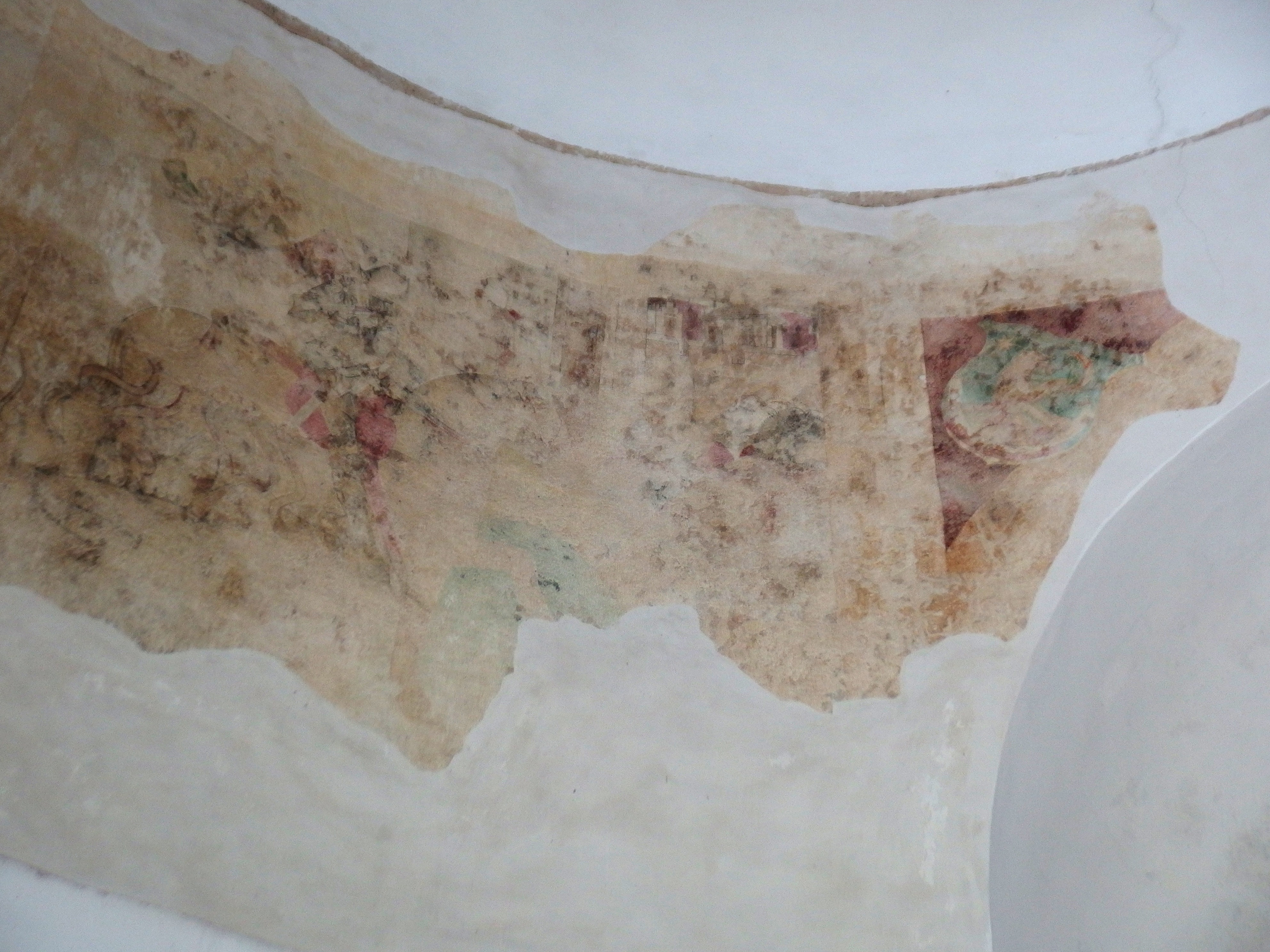
One of the paintings in the interior of the rotunda.

The rotunda contains rare wall paintings. They date from the late 15th century and depict two scenes from the legend of St. George fighting the dragon. The scenes are complemented by coats of arms. In 2002, on the occasion of the celebration of the 630th anniversary of Skalica's elevation to a free royal city, the Záhorie Museum in Skalica installed a permanent exhibition in the rotunda with a thematic focus on presenting this monument and its architectural and historical development. These paintings were only discovered in 1945, and it is still unclear whether they covered the entire perimeter of the rotunda or only two scenes were painted - the first and last from the legend. There are also crypts under the rotunda, which have been explored, but are not open to the public.
