= No Surgery Hours Today =

- Directed by: Vladimír Slavínský
- Written by: Jan Gerstel
- Based on: Dnes neordinuji by Olga Scheinpflugová
- Starring: Jan Pivec; Dagmar Frýbortová; Pavla Vrbenská
- Cinematography: Josef Střecha
- Edited by: Marie Kopecká
- Music by: Josef Stelibský
- Production company: Československá výroba dlouhých filmů
- Distributed by: Státní půjčovna filmů
- Release date: 5 March 1948
- Running time: 98 minutes
- Country: Czechoslovakia
- Language: Czech

No Surgery Hours Today (Czech: Dnes neordinuji) is a 1948 Czechoslovak comedy film directed by Vladimír Slavínský and starring Jan Pivec, Dagmar Frýbortová and Paula Valenská.

== Cast ==
- Jan Pivec as Dr. Jakub Johánek
- Dagmar Frýbortová as Růžena Vojtíšková
- Pavla Vrbenská as Jazz singer Kateřina Kostková
- Josef Gruss as Attorney Jindřich Plevka
- Ota Motyčka as Solicitor Brhlík
- Meda Valentová as Dynybylová
- Jaroslav Mareš as Medicine student Divíšek
- František Kreuzmann as Patient Blažek
- Drahomíra Hůrková as Plevka's Secretary
- Alena Pospíšilová as Věra
- Vladimír Čeřovský as Plevka's Substitute
- Otto Kinský as Patient Kučera
