= Golden Arrow (1949 film) =

- U.S. theatrical release poster
- Directed by: Gordon Parry
- Written by: Sid Colin; Paul Darcy; Anatole de Grunwald
- Produced by: Teddy Baird; Anatole de Grunwald
- Starring: Burgess Meredith; Jean-Pierre Aumont; Paula Valenska
- Cinematography: Otto Heller
- Edited by: Gerald Turney-Smith
- Music by: Mischa Spoliansky
- Production company: De Grunwald Productions
- Distributed by: Renown Pictures; United Artists (US)
- Release date: 31 December 1949
- Running time: 82 minutes
- Country: United Kingdom
- Language: English

Golden Arrow (U.S. title: The Gay Adventure; also known as Three Men and a Girl) is a 1949 British second feature ('B') comedy film directed by Gordon Parry and starring Burgess Meredith, Jean-Pierre Aumont and Paula Valenska. It was written by Sid Colin, Paul Darcy and Anatole de Grunwald and shot at Teddington Studios. The film was made in 1949 and released in 1953 as a second feature, despite a reasonably high budget and well-known cast. The 1953 American release by United Artists was under the title The Gay Adventure. The film takes its title from the Golden Arrow luxury London-Paris boat train service.

== Preservation status ==
The British Film Institute National Archive holds a collection of ephemera and stills but no film or video materials.

== Plot ==
On a journey from Paris to London, a Briton, a Frenchman and an American bond with each other and indulge in day-dreaming romantic fantasies about a girl they see.

== Cast ==
- Burgess Meredith as Dick
- Jean-Pierre Aumont as Andre Marchand
- Paula Valenska as Suzy / Sonia / Hedy
- Kathleen Harrison as Isobel
- Richard Murdoch as David Felton
- Julian D'Albie as Waterhouse
- José de Almeyda as Jones
- Kenneth Kove as clergyman
- Henry Pascal as Mazzini
- Glyn Lawson as Max
- Karel Stepanek as Schroeder
- Edward Lexy as The Colonel

Uncredited (in alphabetical order)

- Patrick Barr as Hedy's husband
- Hilda Bayley as Mrs. Felton
- Derek Blomfield as 1st officer in nightclub
- Gerald Case as 1st military policeman
- Darcy Conyers as 2nd officer in nightclub
- Sandra Dorne as 2nd nightclub hostess
- Colin Gordon as Connelly
- Fred Griffiths as 2nd military policeman
- Ernest Jay as Mr. Felton
- Richard Molinas as Schloss
- Hugh Morton as Perdrelli
- Natasha Parry as Betty Felton
- Ivan Samson as Commanding Officer
- Milo Sperber as black marketeer
- Gordon Tanner as Bixby
- Ingeborg von Kusserow as 1st nightclub hostess
- Richard Warner as Captain

== Reception ==
The Monthly Film Bulletin wrote: "This film, made three years ago but only now released, presents three stories ... The first story, dealing with the adventures of a happy-go-lucky bus-driver and a penniless photographers' model on the Cote d'Azur, is extremely artificial and poorly acted, and has nothing to commend it except some fine scenery. The second, set in the ruins of post-war Berlin, about an American officer and a starving nightclub singer, is well acted but fails to convince, partly because of its non-topicality. The last story, in which the girl is imagined as a glamorous film star who seeks refuge from reporters in a suburban home, has some extremely funny moments, mostly provided by Kathleen Harrison as an ardent film fan."

The Daily Film Renter wrote: "Light, quite amusing, and good relaxation, it is the kind of film almost anybody can take around Christmas."

Picturegoer wrote: "This, the latest contribution to the episodic cycle, is a patchy, hit-or-miss affair. ... Paula Valenska carries off the three-roles-in-one lightly, but with little variation. It's a pleasant journey, though, even if there are too many diversions."

Picture Show wrote: "Brightly acted and directed."
