= Woman to Woman (1929 film) =

1929 film

- Directed by: Victor Saville
- Based on: Woman to Woman a play by Michael Morton
- Produced by: Victor Saville
- Starring: Betty Compson
- Distributed by: Woolf & Freedman Film Service (UK); Tiffany Pictures (US)
- Release date: 1 November 1929
- Running time: 9 reels (2460 meters)
- Country: United Kingdom
- Languages: Sound (All-Talking); English

Woman to Woman is an all-talking sound 1929 British drama film with music directed by Victor Saville and starring Betty Compson, George Barraud and Juliette Compton. It is an adaptation of the 1921 play Woman to Woman by Michael Morton which had already been made in 1923 into a now-lost film. The 1929 version survives and unrestored copies are available on unofficial DVDs and streaming services.

== Plot ==
During the First World War, a British officer - David Compton - on leave from the trenches in Paris falls in love with and has a liaison of three days with a French performing artist: Deloryse/Lola. He proposes to her and tells her to get ready for the wedding in an hour. He rushes to search for the English church. On the way he meets his superior, who tells him that he has to report immediately, they have to leave Paris. He doesn't even have the time to see his fiancé again.

After returning to fight on the front, he suffers from shell shock and forgets everything that happened in the last four years. After recovering he goes back to his wealthy life of rich industrialist, marries a British Socialite, with whom he runs entirely separate lives. She is the one to invite Deloryse to London to dance on one of her charity events. While dancing and singing on the stage she sees him in a loge. During her second number, where she sings the same song of when he met her in Paris, he finally has a flash back of the song and the singer. After the performance he sends her a notice that he wants to see her. She is excited, but when Doctor Gavron visits her, he measures her pulse and tells her, that she has to give up the stage, as the strain might kill her, even if she dances once more. Then David comes. He meets her and his son Davey. But he is now married to a British Socialite: Vesta Compton, who never wanted children, to the big regret of her husband. He tells his wife, that he wants to adopt a boy. She doesn't want to know anything about it. His wife tells him that she will never give him a divorce. Lola wants then to give his son to David's wife, as she understands that there is no future for her and David, but Vesta refuses. Then David wants to stay with Lola and his son and take all the consequences. They plan to leave for Paris that evening, as Davey has his birthday the next day. But Vesta comes to see Lola "from woman to woman" and to tell her that she would ruin David socially, if she lives with him without having him divorced. She gives up little David to bring him to his home. Afterwards she has a breakdown. Soon afterwards she has to perform again for another of Vesta's charity events and visits her sleeping son a last time. When she dances and falls dead at the end, they find out she will never dance again, she dies.

== Cast ==
- Betty Compson as Deloryse / Lola
- George Barraud as David Compton
- Juliette Compton as Vesta Compton
- Margaret Chambers as Florence
- Reginald Sharland as Hal
- Georgie Billings as Davey Compton
- Winter Hall as Doctor Gavron

== Music ==
The film featured a theme song entitled "Sunshine Of My Heart" with words and music by Jay Whidden and Fred May. Also featured on the soundtrack were the songs "To You!" and "Parisian Doll" also written by the same team.

== See also ==
- List of early sound feature films (1926–1929)

== Bibliography ==
- Cook, Pam (ed.). Gainsborough Pictures. Cassell, 1997.
