= Penelope Dudley-Ward =

English actress (1914–1982)

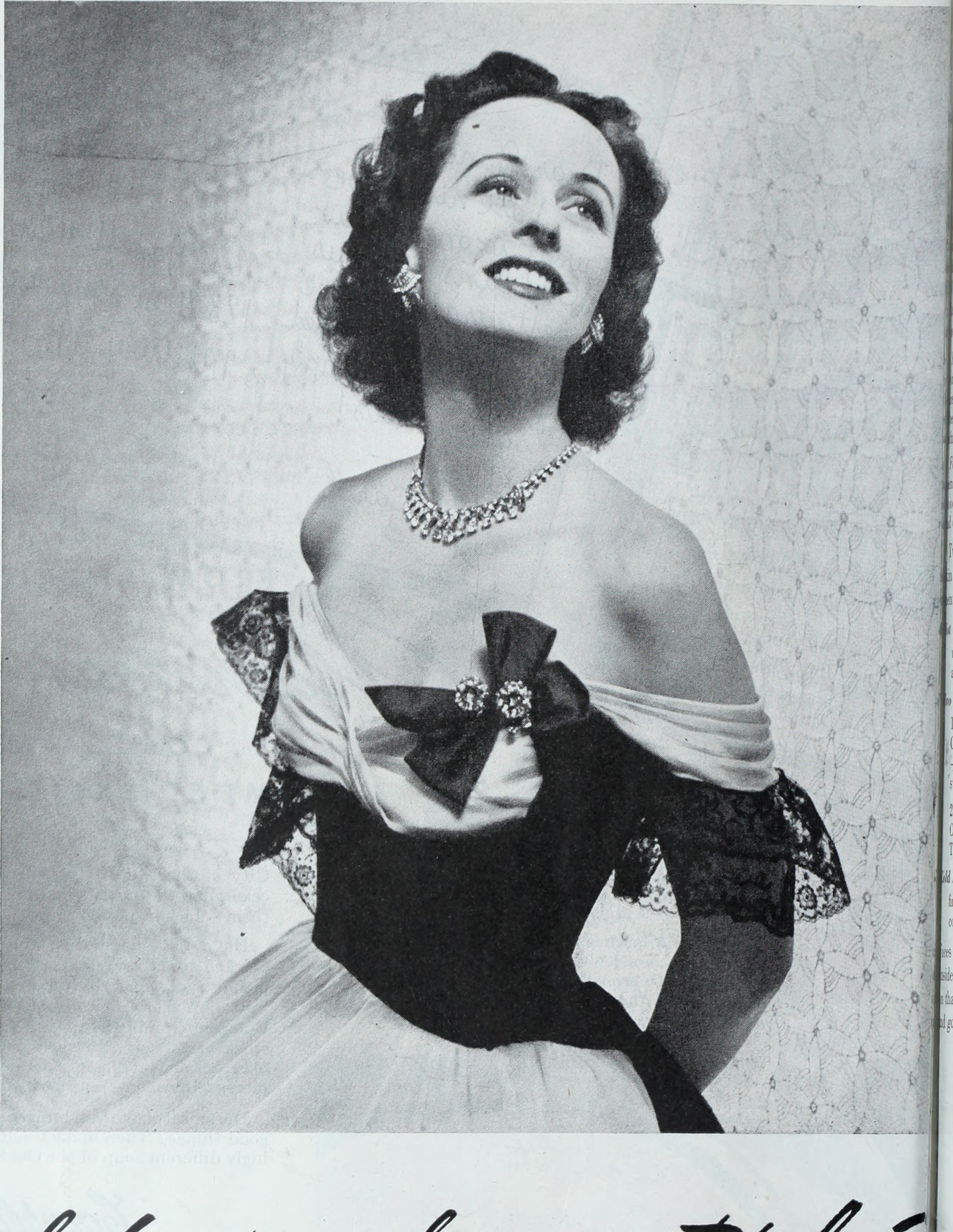
- Born: Penelope Anne Rachel Dudley Ward; 4 August 1914; London, England
- Died: 22 January 1982 (aged 67); London, England
- Occupation: Actress
- Years active: 1935–1944
- Spouses: Anthony Pelissier (m. 1939; div. 1944) Sir Carol Reed (m. 1948; died 1976)
- Children: 2, including Tracy Reed
- Parents: William Dudley Ward; Freda Dudley Ward

Penelope Ann Rachel, Lady Reed (born Penelope Anne Rachel Dudley Ward; 4 August 1914 – 22 January 1982), known as Penelope Dudley-Ward, was an English film actress.

== Biography ==
Dudley-Ward was born in London in 1914. She was the elder of the two daughters of William Dudley Ward, the Liberal Member of Parliament for Southampton, and the leading socialite Freda Dudley Ward (née Birkin). Her mother was a member of the wealthy Birkin family and is best remembered for being the long-time mistress of the Prince of Wales, the future King Edward VIII, from 1918 to 1934.

== Film career ==
Dudley-Ward was a leading lady who typically played strong yet feminine characters, in several British films during the 1930s and 1940s. She was a contract player at Korda's London Films and collaborator of director Anthony Asquith.

Her notable roles include as Natasha Kovrin opposite Laurence Olivier in Asquith's Moscow Nights (1935), as Maureen Fenwick in Noël Coward's In Which We Serve (1942), and Ann Tisdall in Asquith's The Demi-Paradise (1943). She retired from the screen following her second marriage, with her last film role playing as Joan Heseltine opposite Michael Wilding in Harold French's romantic comedy film English without Tears (1944).

== Personal life ==
Dudley-Ward was courted by Brendan Bracken, who "liked it to be thought that he was single because she turned him down."

Dudley-Ward's first marriage, to Anthony Pelissier, lasted from 29 December 1939, until their divorce in 1944. The couple had one daughter, the actress Tracy Reed, most known for starring in Dr. Strangelove (1964).

Dudley-Ward married film director Carol Reed on 24 January 1948. They had one son, Max Reed, born 14 September 1948. Dudley-Ward and Reed remained married until he died in 1976.

== Death ==
Dudley-Ward died from a brain tumour on 22 January 1982 at the age of 67, fourteen months before her mother also died.

== Filmography ==
| Year | Title | Role | Notes |
|---|---|---|---|
| 1935 | Escape Me Never | Fenella McClean | |
| 1935 | Moscow Nights | Natasha Kovrin | |
| 1938 | The Citadel | Toppy LeRoy | |
| 1939 | Hell's Cargo | Annette Lestailleur | |
| 1940 | Dangerous Comment | Mrs. Conway | Short |
| 1940 | Convoy | Mabel | |
| 1940 | The Case of the Frightened Lady | Isla Crane | |
| 1941 | Major Barbara | Sarah Undershaft | |
| 1942 | We Serve | ATS Driver | Short |
| 1942 | In Which We Serve | Maureen | |
| 1943 | The Demi-Paradise | Ann Tisdall | |
| 1944 | The Way Ahead | Mrs. Perry | |
| 1944 | English Without Tears | Joan Heseltine | (final film role) |

== See also ==
- List of notable brain tumour patients
