= Bond Street (film) =

1948 British film by Gordon Parry

- Directed by: Gordon Parry
- Written by: Terence Rattigan; Rodney Ackland; Anatole de Grunwald
- Produced by: Anatole de Grunwald
- Starring: Jean Kent
- Cinematography: Otto Heller; Bryan Langley
- Edited by: Gerald Turney-Smith
- Music by: Benjamin Frankel
- Production companies: De Grunwald Productions for Associated British Picture Corporation
- Distributed by: Associated British-Pathé (UK)
- Release dates: 25 May 1948 (London, England)
- Running time: 109 minutes
- Country: United Kingdom
- Language: English
- Budget: £163,629
- Box office: £155,312 (UK)

Bond Street is a 1948 British portmanteau drama film directed by Gordon Parry and starring Jean Kent, Roland Young, Kathleen Harrison, and Derek Farr. It was written by Terence Rattigan, Rodney Ackland and Anatole de Grunwald based on a story by Rattigan. The film depicts a bride's dress, veil, pearls and flowers purchased in London's Bond Street, and the secret story behind each item.

== Plot ==
There is no overarching story, other than a series of short stories, each linking to Bond street.

Stories include: a deliberately ripped dress; a man ripping his trousers, and getting a lunch-date with the seamstress; and a man trying to avoid a suddenly materialised love interest from Denmark.

== Cast ==
- Jean Kent as Ricki Merritt
- Roland Young as George Chester-Barrett
- Kathleen Harrison as Ethel Brawn
- Derek Farr as Joe Marsh
- Hazel Court as Julia Chester-Barrett
- Ronald Howard as Steve Winter
- Paula Valenska as Elsa
- Patricia Plunkett as Mary Phillips
- Robert Flemyng as Frank Moody
- Adrianne Allen as Mrs. Taverner
- Kenneth Griffith as Len Phillips
- Joan Dowling as Norma
- Charles Goldner as waiter
- James McKechnie as Inspector Yarrow
- Leslie Dwyer as Barman
- Aubrey Mallalieu as Parkins
- Darcy Conyers as bank clerk

== Critical reception ==
The Monthly Film Bulletin wrote: "Roland Young and Paula Valenska make the most of their acting opportunities. The same can hardly be said for the rest of the film, where nearly all the effects are laboured, and even a glimpse of actual Bond Street makes little contact with reality. Except for a startling performance in spivery by Kenneth Griffith (the veil episode), the rest of the cast has no chance to distinguish itself."

Variety wrote: "Supposed to be 24 hours in Bond Street, this could just as easily be a day and night on Main Street anywhere. A few location shots don't justify the title. Fashioned to the Grand Hotelformula, there are four separate episodes linked by a slender framework. Three of the stories are old-fashioned and in novel form, the fourth is adult and amusing. There is much trashy stuff before the final episode, which could have been expanded to a full length film. And it redeems the picture from boredom and gives it some boxoffice chance."

The New York Times called the film "an entertainment grab bag, which, in this case, means that some of the parts are better than the whole...But this spectator's favorite Bond Street interlude is the final chapter, concerning a bouquet and an old flame who turns up at an inopportune time to claim the groom as her own. Roland Young is vastly amusing as the droll father of the prospective bride... Bond Street is fresh enough to have a certain amount of novelty appeal which helps to compensate for the inconsistencies of its dramatic construction. It may not be in a class with Quartet, a handy point of reference, but the new film can stand on its own merits with any audience that is willing to accept half a loaf."

== Box office ==
Trade papers called the film a "notable box office attraction" in British cinemas in 1948.

As of 1 April 1950 the film earned distributor's gross receipts of £104,588 in the UK of which £59,611 went to the producer. The film made a loss of £104,018.
