= Edward Wooll =

British barrister, playwright, and novelist

Edward Wooll, OBE, QC (31 March 1878 – 20 May 1970) was a British barrister, playwright, and novelist.

== Biography ==
The eldest son of the Reverend C. W. Wooll, Vicar of Ditton, Lancashire, Edward Wooll was educated at Liverpool College and New College, Oxford, where he took first-class honours in Classical Moderations. He was called to the Bar by the Inner Temple in 1903. He was one of the first two pupils to join the Liverpool chambers of F. E. Smith, later Earl of Birkenhead.

Wooll served in the Cheshire Yeomanry from 1914 to 1927, retiring as a captain. During the First World War, he served with the Cavalry Corps Headquarters, British Expeditionary Force; for his wartime service, he was mentioned in dispatches twice and was appointed OBE. At the Armistice, he accepted the keys of Cologne from the Mayor, Konrad Adenauer.

He was the Conservative candidate for St Helens in the 1922 general election and Hull Central in the 1923 general election, losing both times. Wooll was Recorder of Carlisle from 1929 to 1963. He was appointed King's Counsel in 1943. For many years, as the senior silk, he was the Leader of the Northern Circuit. He retired from the Bar in October 1965.

Wooll had a career as a playwright and novelist. His most successful play was Libel! which he wrote under the pseudonym "Ward Dorane". Sir Alec Guinness made his first appearance on the professional stage as a non-speaking junior barrister in this play. The play was adapted by BBC Television in 1938 and as a film in 1959, starring Olivia de Havilland, Dirk Bogarde, Paul Massie, Wilfrid Hyde-White and Robert Morley.

== Family ==
Wooll married in 1913 Nora Goold, daughter of Hugh Goold; she died in 1922. He married secondly in 1940 Vera Moore, daughter of John Moore; they had one son and two daughters.

== List of works ==
=== Plays ===
- Libel!, 1934
- Moral Gestures, 1937
- The Last Will, 1964

=== Novels ===
- There is a Tide
- The Lodestar
- Libel, 1935
- The Nettle

=== Other works ===
- Layman’s Guide to Libel
