= Woman to Woman (play) =

Woman to Woman is a 1921 play by the British writer Michael Morton. During the First World War, a British officer and a French dancer meet in a doomed romance.

== Film adaptations ==
The play has been adapted into film on three occasions: a 1923 version directed by Graham Cutts with assistance from a young Alfred Hitchcock, a 1929 version directed by Victor Saville and a 1946 version directed by Maclean Rogers.

== Bibliography ==
- Rachael Low: The History of British Film: Volume VII. Routledge, 1997.
