= Woman to Woman (1923 film) =

1923 film

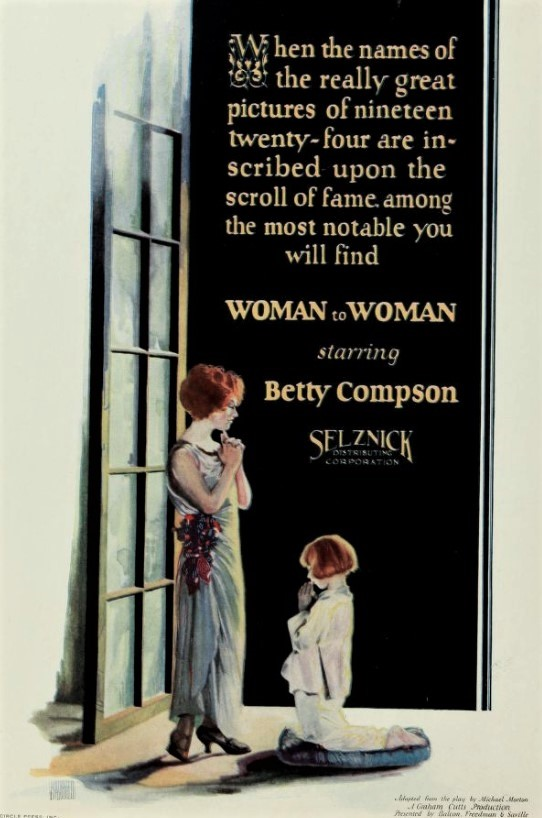
- American advertisement
- Directed by: Graham Cutts; Alfred Hitchcock (uncredited)
- Written by: Graham Cutts; Alfred Hitchcock (uncredited)
- Based on: Woman to Woman by Michael Morton
- Produced by: Michael Balcon; Victor Saville
- Starring: Betty Compson
- Cinematography: Claude McDonnell
- Edited by: Alma Reville
- Distributed by: Woolf & Freedman Film Service
- Release date: August 1923
- Running time: 82 minutes (8 reels; 7455 feet)
- Country: United Kingdom
- Language: Silent (English intertitles)
- Budget: more than £40,000

Woman to Woman is a 1923 British silent drama film directed by Graham Cutts, with Alfred Hitchcock as the uncredited assistant director and co-screenwriter. The film was the first of three adaptions of the 1921 play Woman to Woman by Michael Morton. To capitalise on the success of the film, Cutts and Hitchcock made another film, The White Shadow, with Compson before she returned to the United States.

Hitchcock met his future wife, Alma Reville, while working on this film.

== Plot ==
As described in a film magazine review, Deloryse, a dancer of exquisite charm and grace, is wooed and won by David Compton, an English officer billeted in Paris. On the eve of their marriage, her fiancée is unexpectedly called away. A blow to the head robs him of his memory and he forgets all about the faithful young woman who sacrificed all for him. Later, fate brings them together and, while the man's heart is wrung by the wrong that he has unwittingly done to Deloryse by marrying another woman, Deloryse's one thought is to protect the future of their son. For this, she sacrifices herself by dancing at a fete of the second woman in the case, even after a doctor had warned her that to do so would be fatal.

== Cast ==
- Betty Compson as Louise Boucher / Deloryse
- Clive Brook as David Compton / David Anson-Pond
- Josephine Earle as Mrs. Anson-Pond
- Marie Ault as Henrietta
- Myrtle Peter as Davy
- A. Harding Steerman as Doctor
- Tom Coventry
- Aubrey Fitzgerald
- Donald Searle
- Madge Tree
- George Turner
- Henry Vibart
- Victor McLaglen as Nubian Slave (uncredited)

== Production ==
Michael Balcon and Victor Saville established a new film company. They were approached by Graham Cutts who had optioned film rights to the play. The producers raised the budget from a variety of sources including £7,000 C.W. Woolf and from Oscar Deutsch. Betty Compson was imported from the US at £1,000 a week on a two picture deal.

== Reception ==
The film was a big commercial success but the second film with Compson, The White Shadow as a flop.

== Preservation ==
As of August 2010, the film is missing from the BFI National Archive, and is listed as one of the British Film Institute's "75 Most Wanted" lost films.

== See also ==
- List of lost films
