= Anatole de Grunwald =

Russian British film producer and screenwriter (1910–1967)

Anatole "Tolly" de Grunwald (25 December 1910 – 13 January 1967) was a Russian British film producer and screenwriter.

== Biography ==
De Grunwald was born in Saint Petersburg, Russia, the son of a diplomat (Constantin de Grunwald) in the service of Tsar Nicholas II of Russia. He was seven years old when his father was forced to flee with his family to France during the 1917 Bolshevik Revolution. He grew up in France and England, studied at Gonville and Caius College, Cambridge, where he edited a student magazine, The Europa, and attended the University of Paris (Sorbonne). He started his career in films by reading scripts for Gaumont-British. He then turned to screenwriting in 1939 for the British film industry and eventually became a producer.

He was appointed managing director of Two Cities Films, and later formed his own production company with his brother, Dimitri de Grunwald in 1946. De Grunwald contributed to the scripts of many of his productions, including The Winslow Boy (1948) and The Holly and the Ivy (1952). Most of his films were British productions, although in the 1960s, invited by MGM, he went to the United States where he produced several films, then returned to England for the remainder of his career. Anatole de Grunwald's final films included The V.I.P.s (1963) and The Yellow Rolls-Royce (1965). He worked in close collaboration with the director Anthony Asquith and the dramatist Terence Rattigan, with whom he made many films.

Anatole de Grunwald died in London.

== Filmography ==
- Pygmalion— 1938 (uncredited screenwriter)
- Discoveries — 1938 (screenwriter)
- French Without Tears – 1939 (as co-screenwriter with Terence Rattigan, who was uncredited)
- Spy for a Day — 1940 (screenwriter)
- Major Barbara — 1941 (screenwriter)
- Pimpernel Smith — 1941 (screenwriter)
- Quiet Wedding – 1941 (as co-screenwriter with Rattigan)
- Jeannie — 1941 (screenwriter)
- Cottage to Let (aka Bombsight Stolen) — 1941 (screenwriter)
- Freedom Radio - 1941 (screenwriter)
- Penn of Pennsylvania — 1942 (screenwriter)
- The Day Will Dawn — 1942 (screenwriter)
- Unpublished Story — 1942 (screenwriter)
- The First of the Few – 1942 (as screenwriter) (in the USA known as "Spitfire")
- Secret Mission — 1942 (screenwriter)
- Tomorrow We Live (aka At Dawn We Die ) - 1943 (screenwriter)
- They Met in the Dark — 1943 (screenwriter)
- The Demi-Paradise – 1943
- English Without Tears — 1944 (produced and co-screenwriter)
- The Way to the Stars – 1945
- While the Sun Shines —1947
- Bond Street — 1948
- The Winslow Boy – 1948 (also as screenwriter)
- Now Barabbas — 1949 (screenwriter)
- The Last Days of Dolwyn — 1949
- Golden Arrow — 1949
- The Queen of Spades – 1949
- Flesh and Blood — 1951
- Home at Seven — 1952 (screenwriter)
- Treasure Hunt — 1952
- The Holly and the Ivy – 1952
- Women of Twilight — 1952 (screenplay)
- Innocents in Paris — 1953
- The Doctor's Dilemma – 1958
- Libel – 1959 (also as screenwriter)
- Come Fly with Me – 1962
- I Thank a Fool – 1962
- The V.I.P.s – 1963
- The Yellow Rolls-Royce – 1964
- Stranger in the House – 1967
