= Ronald Howard (actor) =

British actor (1918–1996)

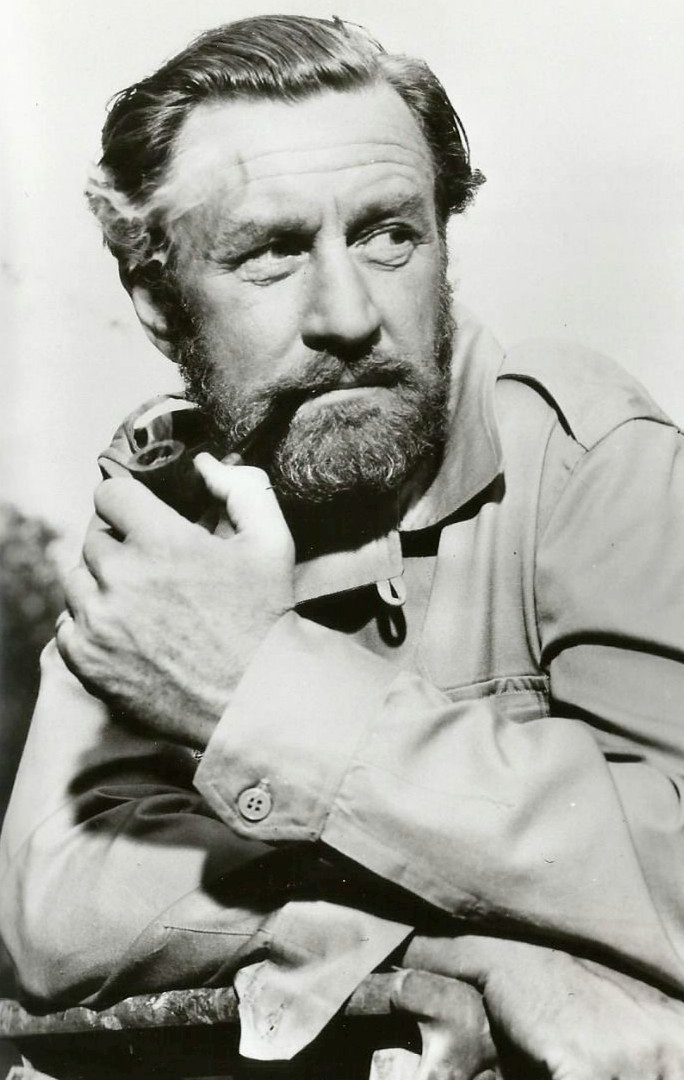
- Howard as Wing Commander Hayes, 1967.
- Born: 7 April 1918; Norwood, London, England
- Died: 19 December 1996 (aged 78); Bridport, Dorset, England
- Education: Jesus College, Cambridge
- Occupation: Actor
- Years active: 1936–1975
- Notable work: Sherlock Holmes (1954 TV series)
- Spouses: Patricia Horsman (m. 1941–1945); Jean Millar (m. 1946)
- Parent(s): Leslie Howard (father); Ruth Evelyn Martin (mother)
- Relatives: Arthur Howard (uncle); Irene Howard (aunt); Alan Howard (cousin)

Ronald Howard (7 April 1918 – 19 December 1996) was an English actor and writer. He appeared as Sherlock Holmes in a weekly television series of the same name in 1954. He was the son of the actor Leslie Howard.

== Early life and education ==
Ronald Howard was born on 7 April 1918 in South Norwood, London, the son of actor Leslie Howard and Ruth Evelyn (née Martin).

He attended Tonbridge School. After graduating from Jesus College, Cambridge, Howard became a newspaper reporter for a while, but then decided to become an actor.

== Film career ==
His first movie role was an uncredited bit part in Pimpernel Smith (1941), a film directed by and starring his father in the title role, though young Howard's part ended up on the cutting room floor. In the early 1940s, Howard gained acting experience in regional theatre, the London stage and eventually films; his official debut was in 1947's While the Sun Shines. Howard received varying degrees of exposure in some well-known films, such as The Queen of Spades (1949) and The Browning Version (1951). Howard played Will Scarlet in the episode of the same name of the 1950s British television classic The Adventures of Robin Hood starring Richard Greene. The character of Scarlet was later portrayed by Paul Eddington.

The 1954 Sherlock Holmes television series, based on the Arthur Conan Doyle characters and produced by Sheldon Reynolds, ran for 39 episodes starring Howard as Holmes and Howard Marion-Crawford as Watson. In addition to 21st century DVD releases, in 2006 and 2014 this series was broadcast in the UK on the satellite channel Bonanza, before being repeated in May 2021 on Talking Pictures TV.

Howard continued mainly in British "B" films throughout the 1950s and 1960s, most notably The Curse of the Mummy's Tomb (1964), along with a few plum television guest roles in British and American television, including Alfred Hitchcock Presents, s.5 ep. 10: "Occurrence At Owl Creek" (1959), Combat! s.2 ep.25: "What Are the Bugles Blowin' For?" – Pt.1 & 2 (1964) Wing Commander Hayes in the 1967 Cowboy in Africa TV show with Chuck Connors and Tom Nardini; two episodes of Boris Karloff's TV series Thriller, S1 E23 "Well of Doom" and S2 E5 "God Grante that She Lye Stille" (both 1961). Of his career in British B films the film historians Steve Chibnall and Brian McFarlane wrote, "Despite his blond good looks (and resemblance to his father) and his agreeable demeanour, he lacked genuine star quality."

Additionally in 1960 he appeared in the television series Danger Man in the episode entitled "The Traitor" as Noel Goddard.

In the mid-1970s, he reluctantly put aside his acting career to run an art gallery.

== In Search of My Father ==
In the 1980s he wrote In Search of My Father: A Portrait of Leslie Howard, a biography covering the career and mysterious death of his father, whose plane was shot down over the Bay of Biscay on 1 June 1943. His conclusion (which remains in dispute) was that the Germans' goal in shooting down the plane was to kill his father, who was Jewish and who had been travelling through Spain and Portugal, ostensibly lecturing on film, but also meeting with local activists and shoring up support for the Allied cause.

The Nazis suspected surreptitious activities since German agents were active throughout Spain and Portugal, which, like Switzerland, was a crossroads for persons from both sides of the conflict, but even more accessible to Allied citizens.

The book explores in detail written German orders to the Ju 88 Staffel based in France which was assigned to intercept the aircraft, as well as communiqués on the British side that verify intelligence reports of the time indicating a deliberate attack on Howard. Ronald Howard was convinced that the order to shoot down the airliner came directly from Joseph Goebbels, the Nazi Minister of Propaganda, who had been ridiculed in one of Leslie Howard's films, and who believed him to be the most dangerous British propagandist.

== Personal life ==
Howard married Patricia Horsman in 1941, which ended in divorce in 1945. He married Jean Millar in 1946.

== Death ==
He died on 19 December 1996 in Dorset.

== Filmography ==
=== Television ===
- Sherlock Holmes (1954) – Sherlock Holmes
- The Adventures of Robin Hood (1955) (Two episodes)) – Will Scarlet two episodes)
- The Adventures of Aggie (1956) (Season 1, episode 6: "The Chiseller") – Heinrich
- Mary Britten, M.D. (1958) – Stephen Britten
- Alfred Hitchcock Presents (1959) (Season 5, episode 13: "An Occurrence at Owl Creek Bridge") – Peyton Farquhar
- One Step Beyond (1960) (Season 2, episode 25 "The Haunting") – Colin Chandler
- Alfred Hitchcock Presents (1961) (Season 6, episode 33: "A Secret Life") – James Howgill
- Combat! (1964) (Season 2, episodes 25 and 26 "What Are the Bugles Blowin'For?" pt 1 and pt 2) – Captain Johns
- Run a Crooked Mile (1969, TV Movie) – Inspector Huntington

=== Film ===
- Romeo and Juliet (1936) – Minor Secondary Role (uncredited)
- "Pimpernel" Smith (1941) – Minor Role (uncredited)
- While the Sun Shines (1947) – Earl of Harpenden
- Night Beat (1947) – Andy Kendall
- My Brother Jonathan (1948) – Harold Dakers
- Bond Street (1948) – Steve Winter
- The Queen of Spades (1949) – Andrei
- Now Barabbas (1949) – Roberts Bank Cashier
- Double Confession (1950) – Hilary Boscombe
- Portrait of Clare (1950) – Ralph Hingston
- Flesh and Blood (1951) – Purley
- The Browning Version (1951) – Gilbert
- Assassin for Hire (1951) – Detective Inspector Carson
- Night Was Our Friend (1951) – John Harper
- Wide Boy (1952) – Inspector Carson
- Black Orchid (1953) – Dr. John Winnington
- Street Corner (1953) (aka Both Sides of the Law) – David Evans
- Noose for a Lady (1953) – Dr. Evershed
- Glad Tidings (1953) – Corporal Brayne R.A.F.
- Flannelfoot (1953) – Detective Sergeant Fitzgerald
- The Hideout (1956) – Robert Grant
- Drango (1957) – Clay Allen
- Light Fingers (1957) – Michael Lacey
- The House in the Woods (1957) – Spencer Rowland
- I Accuse! (1958) – Captain Avril
- Gideon's Day (1958) – Paul Delafield
- Moment of Indiscretion (1958) – John Miller
- No Trees in the Street (1959) – Detective Sergeant Frank Collins
- Babette Goes to War (1959) – Fitzpatrick
- Man Accused (1959) – Bob Jenson
- The Malpas Mystery – Dick Shannon
- The Spider's Web (1960) – Jeremy
- Compelled (1960) – Paul Adams
- The Monster of Highgate Ponds (1961) – Uncle Dick
- The Naked Edge (1961) – Mr. Claridge
- Come September (1961) – Spencer
- Murder She Said (1961) – Eastley
- Fate Takes a Hand (1961) – Tony
- The Spanish Sword (1962) – Sir Richard
- Live Now – Pay Later (1962) – Cedric Mason
- Nurse on Wheels (1963) – Dr. Harold Golfrey
- The Bay of St Michel (1963) – Bill Webb
- Siege of the Saxons (1963) – Edmund
- Bomb in the High Street (1963) – Captain Manning
- The Curse of the Mummy's Tomb (1964) – John Bray
- Weekend at Dunkirk (1964) – Robinson
- You Must be Joking (1965) – Cecil
- Africa Texas Style (1967) – Hugo Copp
- The Hunting Party (1971) – Watt Nelson
- Persecution (1974) – Dr. Ross
- Take a Hard Ride (1975) – Halsey (final film role)
