= Morningside High School =

Former High school in Inglewood, California, United States

Location
- 10500 S. Yukon Ave; Inglewood, California 90303; United States
- Coordinates: 33.93966°N 118.33108°W

Information
- School type: Public, high school
- Motto: Knowledge is Power
- Established: 1951; 75 years ago
- Status: Pending closure
- Closed: June 30, 2025
- School district: Inglewood Unified School District
- NCES School ID: 061839002260
- Principal: Kiwiana Cain
- Teaching staff: 32.83 (FTE) (2023–2024)
- Grades: 9–12
- Enrollment: 483 (2023–2024)
- Student to teacher ratio: 14.71 (2023–2024)
- Campus: Urban
- Colors: Scarlet; White
- Athletics conference: CIF Southern Section; Ocean League
- Nickname: Monarchs
- Rivals: Inglewood High School
- Newspaper: The Side Times
- Website: mhs.inglewoodusd.com

Morningside High School was a public high school in Inglewood, California, in the Los Angeles metropolitan area. A part of the Inglewood Unified School District, it is the second largest high school in the city after Inglewood High School. In 2024, the Inglewood Unified School District announced that it was closing Morningside High at the end of the 2024-2025 academic year.

== History ==
In 1951, the first two classes of students came to the Morningside Park area of Inglewood to attend the new Morningside High School. Incoming 9th graders came from the surrounding junior high schools, and a class of 10th graders transferred to Morningside from Inglewood High School. Some of Inglewood High School's faculty transferred as well, including A. John Waldmann, the first principal of Morningside High School.

Circa 2005 the school had more than 1,600 students. In 2025 this was down to 465, and IUSD plans to close Morningside High.

== In popular culture ==
In 1993, Wesley Snipes narrated the documentary, Hardwood Dreams, following five MHS seniors during their last high school basketball season as they dreamt of the National Basketball Association. Ten years later, Snipes narrated the 2004 TV sequel, Hardwood Dreams: Ten Years Later.

Chris Gaines was a fictional MHS student and alternative rock musician, developed by Garth Brooks in 1999 for a proposed movie.

== Notable alumni ==
- Roberta Achtenberg: Assistant Secretary of HUD under President Bill Clinton
- John Arrillaga: real estate investor
- John Bahler: musical arranger and director, including Michael Jackson, Elvis Presley, and Barbra Streisand
- Tom Bahler: singer, arranger and producer, including Brian Setzer, The Partridge Family, and Neil Diamond
- Bobbie Bass: Hollywood stuntman, TV and movie extra, including Star Trek: The Original Series; stepfather to Bo Derek
- Boris Cabrera (1999): former actor
- Elden Campbell (d. 2025): professional basketball player who played center for Los Angeles Lakers and 2004 NBA champion Detroit Pistons
- Jackie Goldberg: politician, teacher (Compton Unified School District), former member of California State Assembly and Los Angeles City Council, former president of Los Angeles School Board
- Flo Hyman (d. 1986): volleyball player, Olympic silver medalist
- Ralph Johnson (musician): longtime percussionist and drummer with Earth, Wind and Fire.
- Charles Jordan: professional football player with Los Angeles Raiders, Green Bay Packers, Miami Dolphins, and Seattle Seahawks
- Vicki Lawrence (1967): singer, including The Night The Lights Went Out In Georgia and for The Young Americans touring musical group; appeared in feature film The Young Americans, which won Academy Award for Best Documentary; actress, including The Carol Burnett Show and Mama's Family; won 2004 TV Land Award and 1976 Emmy Award; nominee Golden Globe Award; nominee Daytime Emmy Award; game show panelist
- Jim Lefebvre: Major League Baseball player (Los Angeles Dodgers 1965–72), coach (Dodgers, Oakland Athletics, San Francisco Giants, Cincinnati Reds, Milwaukee Brewers) and manager (Seattle Mariners, Chicago Cubs, Brewers and China National Team, 2008 Olympics). Lefebvre also played for the Lotte Orions in the Japanese League from 1972–77.
- Lisa Leslie (class of 1990): basketball player for USC and WNBA; actress, Wilhelmina supermodel; 1996, 2000, 2004, and 2008 Olympic gold medalist, two-time WNBA champion, three-time MVP and eight-time All-Star, 2015 inductee in Basketball Hall of Fame
- David Levy, Ph.D.: psychologist, author, speaker; actor in 1970's TV series Wonderbug
- Stan Love: NBA basketball player with Washington Bullets and Los Angeles Lakers, brother of Beach Boys lead singer Mike Love and first cousin of Brian Wilson, Dennis Wilson and Carl Wilson, father of veteran NBA basketball player Kevin Love, the 2007 Gatorade HS Male Athlete of the Year
- DeWayne "Blackbyrd" McKnight: American guitarist and music director, Rock & Roll Hall of Fame inductee, Herbie Hancock's Headhunters, Miles Davis, P-Funk' Red Hot Chili Peppers
- Carolyn Mitchell (née Barbara Ann Thomason): actress, wife of Mickey Rooney
- Tom Nardini: film and television actor, appeared in Cat Ballou (1965), Africa Texas Style (1967), and TV series Cowboy in Africa (1967–68)
- Jim Photoglo: songwriter, including Nitty Gritty Dirt Band's hit "Fishin' in the Dark"; wrote songs recorded by Marty Robbins, Everly Brothers, Brenda Lee, Dusty Springfield, Garth Brooks, Faith Hill, Travis Tritt, Patty Loveless; musician, including opened for the Beach Boys, toured as singer-musician with Dan Fogelberg, Vince Gill, Nicolette Larson, Kathy Mattea and Wendy Waldman
- Curren Price: Los Angeles City Councilman beginning in 2013, Price previously served as the Assemblyman for the 51st district of the California State Assembly from 2006 to 2009 before serving in the California State Senate from 2009 to 2013; previously Inglewood City Councilman; ran unsuccessfully for Inglewood mayor (1997)
- Byron Scott (class of 1979): head coach of four NBA teams and three-time champion as player with Los Angeles Lakers
- Danny Tabor, mayor of Inglewood, California
- Tina Thompson (class of 1993): basketball player for USC and WNBA, 2004 and 2008 Olympics gold medalist; four-time WNBA champion and nine-time All-Star
- Lisa Wu: Television personality, The Real Housewives of Atlanta and Hollywood Divas.

== Notable faculty ==
- Jim Harrick: basketball coach (1964 - 1972); went on to coach college basketball at Pepperdine University, UCLA, University of Rhode Island, University of Georgia, Utah State University
- Phyllis Love, Hollywood and Broadway actress; taught drama and English

== See also ==
- Hardwood Dreams
- Hardwood Dreams: Ten Years Later
