= The Bay of St Michel =

1963 British film by John Ainsworth

- Theatrical release poster
- Directed by: John Ainsworth
- Written by: Christopher Davis
- Produced by: Michael Williams
- Starring: Keenan Wynn; Mai Zetterling; Ronald Howard
- Cinematography: Steven Dade
- Edited by: Tristam Cones
- Production company: Pinewood Studios
- Release date: March 1963
- Running time: 80 minutes
- Country: United Kingdom
- Language: English

The Bay of St Michel (also known as The Bay of Saint Michael, Pattern for Plunder and Operation Mermaid ) is a 1963 British second feature ('B') film directed by John Ainsworth and starring Keenan Wynn, Mai Zetterling, Ronald Howard and Rona Anderson. It was written by Christopher Davis.

== Plot ==
A trio of World War 2 veterans reunite to search for a lost Nazi fortune.

== Cast ==
- Keenan Wynn as Nick Rawlings
- Mai Zetterling as Helene Bretton
- Ronald Howard as Bill Webb
- Rona Anderson as Pru Lawson
- Trader Faulkner as Dave Newton
- Victor Beaumont as man in the 'Boîte d'Or'
- Michael Peake as Captain Starkey
- Rudolph Offenbach as Father Laurent
- Paul Bogdan as General von Kreisling
- Rita Webb as Mrs Johnson, the landlady
- Murray Kash as boorish man
- Mike Jenkinson as drunken sailor
- Harvey Hall as SS officer
- Sidney Gross as barman
- Patrick Darren as Stuart
- Sally Aylward as barmaid
- Michael Landeau as French officer
- Edward Underdown as Colonel Harvey

== Reception ==
The Monthly Film Bulletin wrote: "An unsophisticated but quickly-moving little adventure melodrama on a hackneyed theme, which is well enough acted and has the advantage of some good location work. It owes much to its ingenious script, contrived and rather too dependent on coincidence though it be; speed, surprise and the sudden twist at the end largely help to cover these deficiencies."

Leslie Halliwell said: "Uninspired hokum programmer."

The Radio Times Guide to Films gave the film 2/5 stars, calling it an "unassuming little thriller."

== See also ==
- Mont-Saint-Michel
