= Inglewood High School (California) =

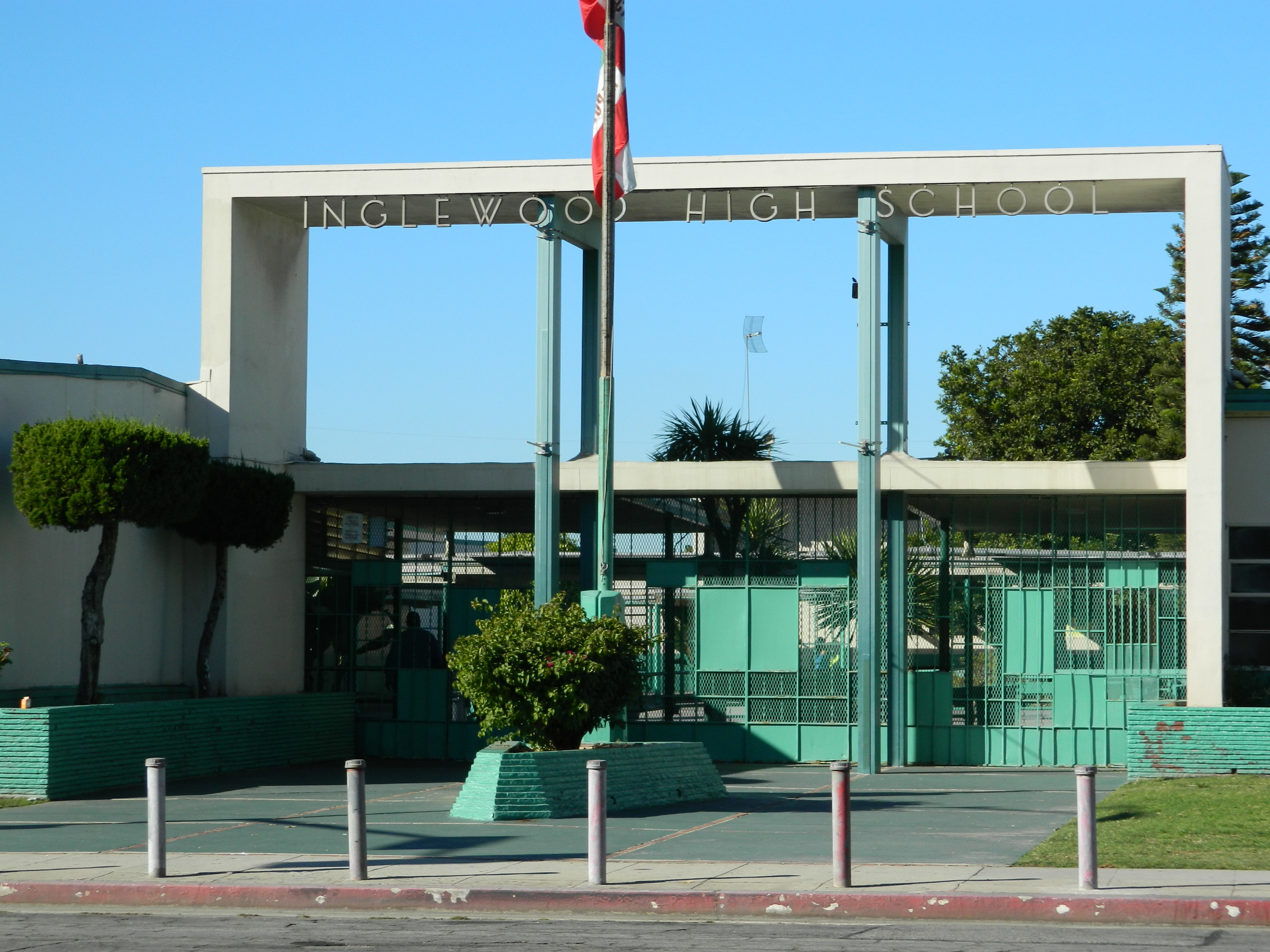

Location
- 231 South Grevillea Avenue; Inglewood, California, United States; 33°57′40″N 118°21′21″W

Information
- Type: Public high school
- Founded: 1905
- School district: Inglewood Unified School District
- CEEB code: 51260
- Principal: Lamar Collins
- Teaching staff: 37.74 (FTE)
- Grades: 9–12
- Gender: Co-educational
- Enrollment: 778 (2023–2024)
- Student to teacher ratio: 20.61
- Campus type: Urban
- Colors: Green and white
- Athletics conference: CIF Southern Section; Ocean League
- Nickname: Sentinels
- Rival: Morningside High School
- Newspaper: The Sentinel Weekly
- Communities served: Inglewood

Inglewood High School is a four-year public high school in Inglewood, California, United States. It is a part of the Inglewood Unified School District.

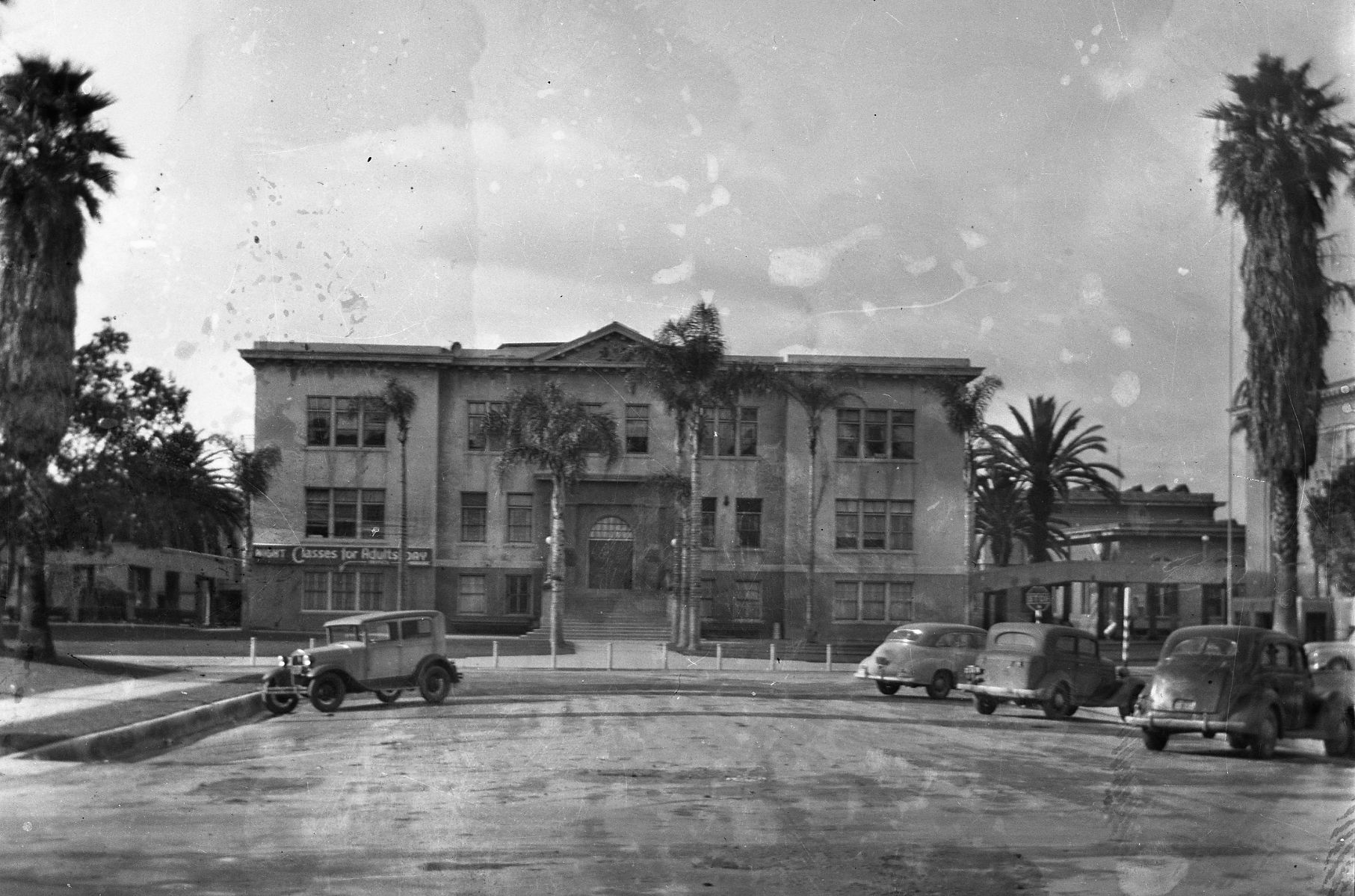
Administration building at foot of Nutwood Avenue, 1947

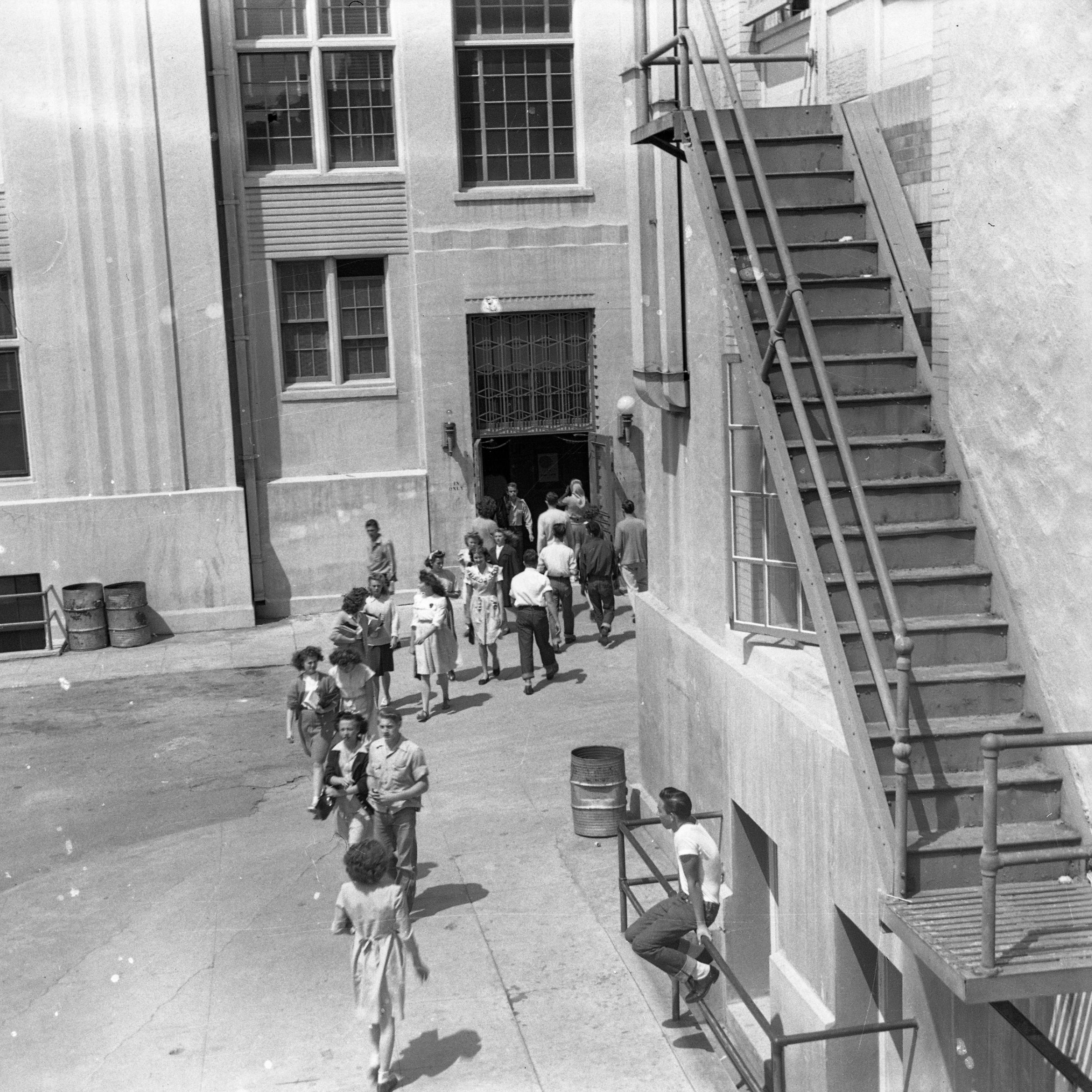
Interval between class periods, 1947

== History ==
The school opened its doors in 1905.

== Notable faculty ==
- Daniel Anthony Farris (also known as D Smoke), rap artist, Spanish and music-theory teacher
- Gladys Waddingham, author, taught Spanish for 45 years at the high school

== Notable alumni ==
=== Basketball ===
- DeAngelo Collins, professional basketball player
- Jason Crowe, professional basketball player
- Jason Crowe Jr., all-time leading scorer in California High School basketball history, #5 ranked recruit committed to University of Missouri
- Ade Dagunduro, professional basketball player
- Lauren Ervin, professional basketball player
- Noel Felix, professional basketball player
- Jason Hart, NBA basketball player
- Jay Humphries, professional basketball player
- Ralph Jackson, NBA basketball player
- Travele Jones, professional basketball player
- Vince Kelley, NBL Australia basketball player
- Harold Miner, USC and NBA basketball player, Slam Dunk Contest champion
- Paul Pierce, NBA basketball player, 10-time All-Star
- Reggie Theus, professional basketball player and college head coach
- Doug Thomas, professional basketball player
- Fred Williams, WNBA basketball coach, college basketball coach at USC, 1983–1997

=== Baseball ===
- Dottie Wiltse Collins, AAGPBL player and 'Strikeout Queen'
- Coco Crisp, former Major League Baseball (MLB) player
- Pat Dodson, former MLB player
- Gail Henley, former MLB player
- Horacio Ramírez, former MLB and Mexican League player and current coach

=== Football ===
- Shaquelle Evans, NFL football player
- TJ Harden, college football player
- Lawrence Jackson, NFL football player
- Gary Kerkorian, NFL football player
- Montana Lemonious-Craig, NFL football player
- Verl Lillywhite, professional football player
- Justyn Martin, college football player
- Benson Mayowa, NFL football player
- Patrick Onwuasor, NFL player
- Jarvis Redwine, professional football player
- Justus Ross-Simmons, college football player
- Jim Sears, AFL and NFL football player
- Jim Sutherland, college football head coach, class of 1933
- Zaven Yaralian, football coach

=== Others ===
- Glenn M. Anderson, 37th lieutenant governor of California, Congressman
- Sonny Bono, singer, songwriter, actor, and politician
- Jeanne Crain, actress
- Robert Finch, 38th lieutenant governor of California
- Mack 10, rapper
- David Marks, guitarist for the Beach Boys
- Donald Merrifield, Jesuit priest and former president of Loyola University of Los Angeles
- Edla Muir, architect
- Ms. Toi, rapper
