= The House in the Woods (film) =

1957 British film by Maxwell Munden

- Opening titles
- Directed by: Maxwell Munden
- Written by: Maxwell Munden
- Produced by: Geoffrey Goodhart
- Starring: Patricia Roc; Ronald Howard; Michael Gough
- Edited by: John Ferris
- Production company: St. Johns Wood Studios / Film Workshop
- Release date: 1957
- Running time: 62 minutes
- Country: United Kingdom
- Language: English

The House in the Woods is a 1957 British second feature ('B') thriller film directed by Maxwell Munden and starring Patricia Roc, Ronald Howard and Michael Gough. It was written by Munden based on the short story Prelude to Murder by Walter C. Brown.

== Plot ==
Author Geoff Carter lives with his wife Carol in a Chelsea flat, but Geoff can't concentrate because of the noisy neighbours. When artist Spencer Rowland advertises his isolated cottage for rent, Geoff and Carol move in. But Spencer plans to murder them both, and use Carol's remains to falsely claim a legacy from his wife, whom he has also killed. Geoff gets suspicious and they escape the cottage.

== Cast ==
- Michael Gough as Geoff Carter
- Patricia Roc as Carol Carter
- Ronald Howard as Spencer Rowland
- Andrea Trowbridge as Mrs Shellaby
- Bill Shine as Colonel Shellaby
- Nora Hammond as Mrs Bletchley
- Tim Ellison as elegant young man

== Reception ==
Kine Weekly wrote: "Pocket crime melodrama, unfolded in the sticks. The tale is off the beaten track, but arty-crafty treatment and hifalutin' dialogue rob it of suspense and mass appeal. Very moderate quota second. ... The picture not only has more talk than action, but also insists upon playing the villain's favourite record, a chilling number written by Larry Adler, with and without provocation. Patricia Roc is a natural Carol, but: Ronald Howard and Michael Gough are much too intense as Spencer and Geoff. It has little light relief and what there is is pseudo-Chelsea and contributes to an abrupt ending."

Picturegoer wrote: "Goody! A country cottage thriller as cosy as muffins for tea. ... If you don't lap this up with all its absurdities it isn't the fault of an excellent trio, Patricia Roc Michael Gough and Ronald Howard, who keep this thriller tense and believable."

== Home media ==
The film was released on DVD by Network in 2014.
