= Ocean League =

High school athletic league in California

The Ocean League is a high school athletic conference in Los Angeles County, California affiliated with the CIF Southern Section.

== Member schools ==
- Beverly Hills High School
- Centennial High School
- Hawthorne High School
- Inglewood High School
- Leuzinger High School
- Santa Monica High School
- Culver City High School
- Lawndale High School

== Former members ==
- El Segundo High School
- Morningside High School
