= Edla Muir =

American architect

Edla Muir (January 23, 1906 – November 5, 1971) was an American architect, best known for designing residences in Southern California.

== Early life and education ==
Muir was born in 1906 in San Francisco, California. Her father was Joseph Muir, a throat surgeon and diplomat, and her mother Ethel Fitch Muir was an operatic soprano. Her first name is from her father's earlier wife, Edla Coleman McPherson, who died before her parents married. Edla Muir's parents divorced in 1916.

As a schoolgirl, she worked weekends and summers for a Santa Monica-based architect, John Byers. She graduated from Inglewood High School in 1923, and then began working full-time in Byers' office. In 1927, she won a cash prize for her designs from the Rondith Corporation.

== Career ==
Muir focused on designing modern private homes, especially for clients in Malibu, Pacific Palisades, and other affluent Southern California communities. Among her celebrity clients were Shirley Temple, Robert Taylor and Barbara Stanwyck. She earned her architecture license in 1934, and continued at the Byers office until 1942. After World War II, she opened her own office, and was an independent architect until the end of her life. Her designs were featured in Sunset, Architectural Digest, and other publications as representative of the modern California home. She also designed some public and commercial buildings, such as a supermarket and the City Hall in Ellensburg, Washington and a corporate office in Mexico City. Her design for the Zona Hall residence in West Los Angeles won the Honor Award of the Southern California chapter, American Institute of Architects in 1952.

She also designed her own family's residence, a dramatic structure on the side of a cliff at Mandeville Canyon.

== Personal life and legacy ==
Edla Muir married Clyde Lambie, and had one son. She died in November 1971, age 65. In 1982 the Organization of Women Architects honored Edla Muir and Lutah Maria Riggs as pioneering women in architecture, in a publication to mark the group's tenth anniversary. She was also one of the women architects highlighted in a 1989 exhibit at the Pacific Design Center.

Muir's papers are in the Architecture and Design Collection at University Museum, University of California, Santa Barbara.

== Works outside southern California ==
Name	City	US State/ Country	Completed	Other Information	Image
Balcom, Mr. and Mrs. Maurice ranch house alterations	Thorpe	Washington/USA	1954		
Brotherton, Harley house alterations	Ellensburg	Washington/USA	1954		
Chase, Goodwin ranch alterations	Ellensburg	Washington/USA	1954		
Coppock house	Ellensburg	Washington/USA	undated		
Ellensburg Chamber of Commerce board room Antlers Hotel	Ellensburg	Washington/USA	1955		
Dane, Mr and Mrs. Harrison K. House	Ellensburg	Washington/USA	1956		
Dano Harrison K. Overland	Ellensburg	Washington/USA	1956		
Dwyer house	Ellensburg	Washington/USA	undated		
