= Inglewood Unified School District =

Public school system district in the United States

Location
- Inglewood, California California United States

District information
- Type: Public
- Grades: Pre-K through 12
- Superintendent: Dr. Erika F. Torres

Inglewood Unified School District (IUSD) is a public school system district headquartered in and serving Inglewood, California.

IUSD serves most of the city of Inglewood and much of the unincorporated Los Angeles County community of Ladera Heights. A small section of View Park-Windsor Hills and a small section of Los Angeles are in the district boundaries.

== History ==
When the Inglewood Union High School District, now known as the Centinela Valley Union High School District (CVUHSD), formed in 1905, the Inglewood elementary school district was within its territory. The name of the high school district changed to its current name on November 1, 1944. On July 1, 1954, the Inglewood elementary school district withdrew from CVUSD and became a unified school district that also operated high schools.

== Fiscal Crisis and Legislative Intervention ==
Serving the community for over a century, IUSD has undergone significant challenges, notably highlighted in the legislative intervention of Senate Bill 533 (SB 533) in 2012. On September 14, 2012, the Governor sanctioned SB 533 to address the pressing financial issues within IUSD. The legislation, accompanied by a state-approved emergency appropriation of $55 million aimed to prevent fiscal insolvency, ensuring the district's ability to meet its financial obligations. The bill mandated the development of assessment and improvement plans for the district, with an annual comprehensive review conducted by the Fiscal Crisis and Management Assistance Team (FCMAT). IUSD bears 100% of the costs associated with implementing the FCMAT review. Additionally, SB 533 appropriated $29,000,000 from the state's General Fund as an emergency loan, specifying the procedures for repayment.

The fiscal crisis stemmed from several factors, including the overstatement of average daily attendance (ADA), understatement of California State Teachers' Retirement System payments, inaccuracies in certified salary expenses, continued deficit spending, and a decline in enrollment.

== Enrollment Challenges ==
IUSD has dealt with a persistent decline in enrollment, experiencing a substantial decrease of approximately 10, 341 students (57.5%) since its peak in 2003-04 academic year, with an additional 322 students leaving in the 2021-22 school year.

The district's first interim report for the 2021-22 academic year showcased further enrollment reductions, estimating decreases of 536 and 310 students for the 2022–23 and 2023-24 school year, respectively. This would result in an anticipated enrollment of approximately 7,092 students in 2022-23 and 6,782 in 2023-24.

== Schools ==
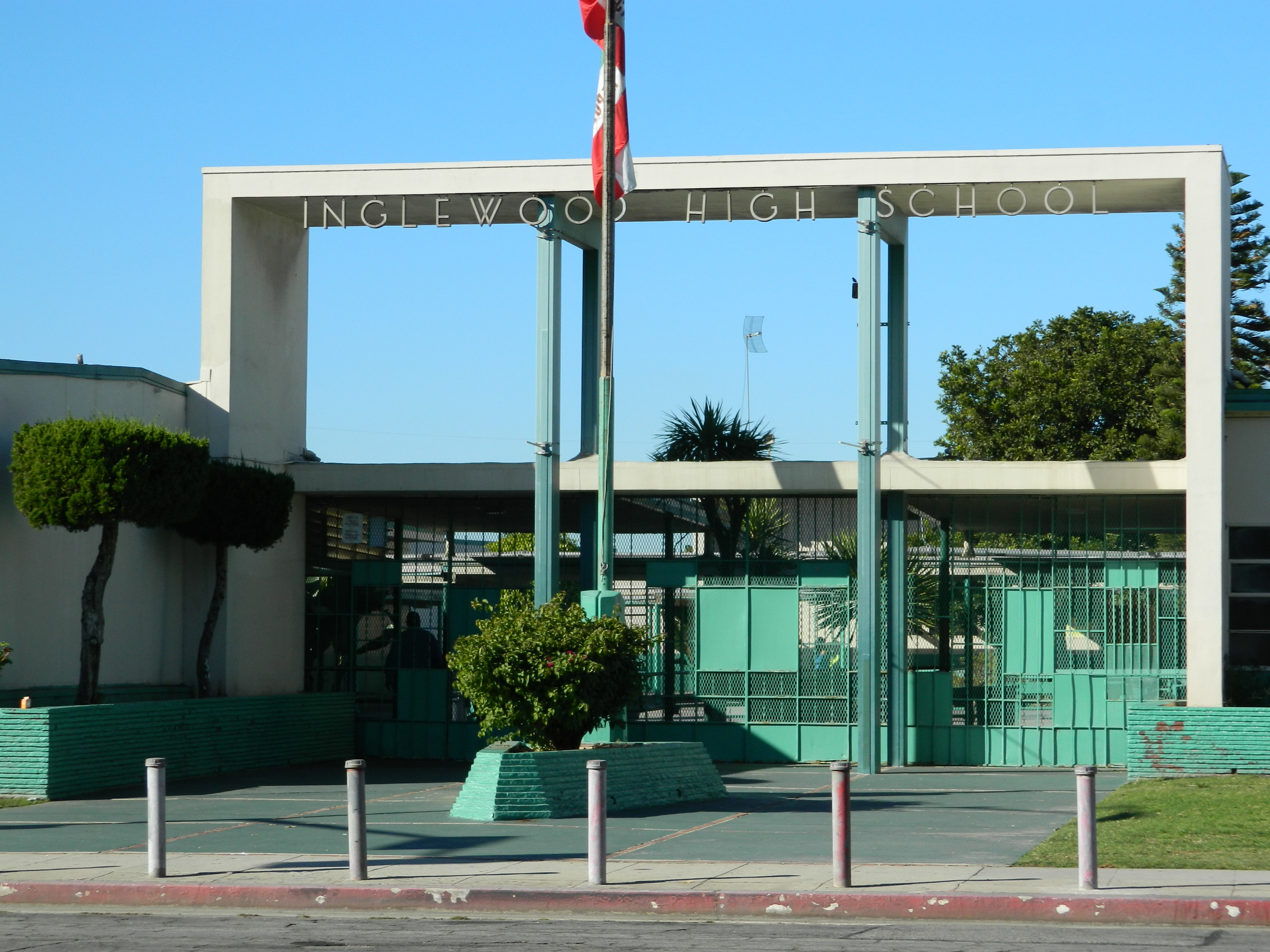
Inglewood High School

=== Adult schools ===
- Inglewood Community Adult School

=== Continuation schools ===
- Inglewood Continuation High School

=== High schools ===
Zoned

- Inglewood High School
- Morningside High School - Originally Scheduled to close in 2025, the closure has been postponed to the 2027-2028 school year due to Inglewood High School being reconstructed, which means the students would have to attend this school for now until reconstruction at the other high school is completed.

Alternative

- City Honors High School

=== K-8 schools ===
- Bennett-Kew K-8 Leadership Academy of Excellence
- Centinela K-8 School
- Frank D. Parent K-8 School
- La Tijera K-8 School
- Oak Street TK-8 School
- Payne P-8 STEAM Academy
- Woodworth-Monroe K-8 Academy- Formerly Albert F. Monroe Middle School

=== Primary schools ===
K-6

- Warren Lane Elementary School
- Beulah Payne Elementary School

K-5

- Oak Street Elementary School
- Worthington Elementary School

== See also ==
- List of school districts in California
