= Leslie Howard =

English actor and writer (1893–1943)

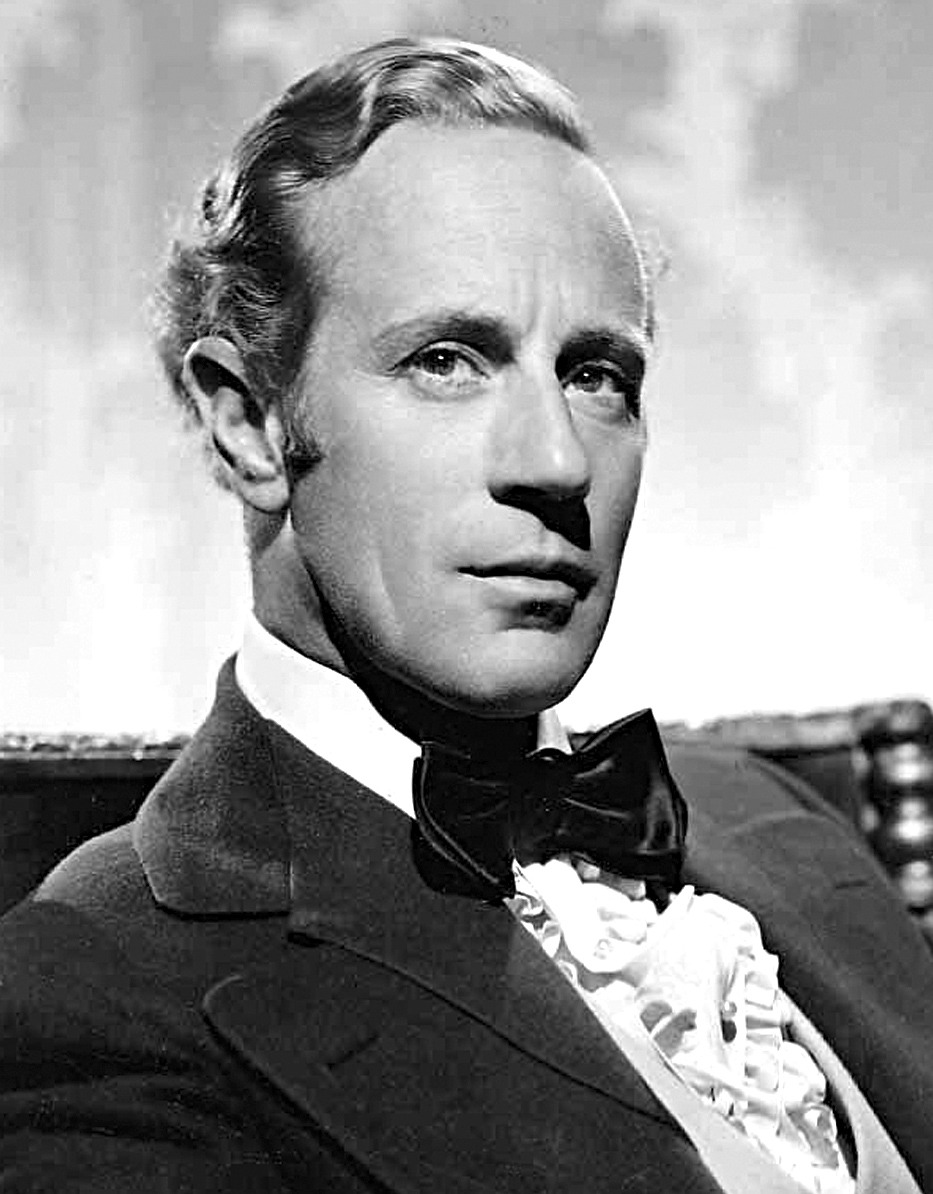
- Howard as Ashley Wilkes in Gone with the Wind, 1939
- Born: Leslie Howard Steiner; 3 April 1893; Forest Hill, London, England
- Died: 1 June 1943 (aged 50); At sea off the coast of Galicia, Spain, near Cedeira
- Cause of death: Aircraft shot down
- Occupations: Actor; director; producer; writer
- Years active: 1913–1943
- Known for: Sir Percy Blakeney in The Scarlet Pimpernel (1934); Professor Higgins in Pygmalion (1938); Ashley Wilkes in Gone with the Wind (1939)
- Spouse: Ruth Evelyn Martin (m. 1916)
- Children: 2, including Ronald
- Military service
- Allegiance: United Kingdom
- Service: British Army
- Service years: 1914–1916
- Rank: Subaltern
- Units: Inns of Court Regiment; Northamptonshire Yeomanry
- Wars: First World War

Leslie Howard Steiner (3 April 1893 – 1 June 1943), better known as Leslie Howard, was an English actor, director, producer, and writer. He wrote many stories and articles for The New York Times, The New Yorker, and Vanity Fair and was one of the biggest box-office draws and movie idols of the 1930s.

Active in both Britain and Hollywood, Howard played Ashley Wilkes in Gone with the Wind (1939). He had roles in many other films, including Berkeley Square (1933), Of Human Bondage, The Scarlet Pimpernel (both 1934), The Petrified Forest (1936), Pygmalion (1938), Intermezzo (1939), "Pimpernel" Smith (1941), and The First of the Few (1942). He was nominated for the Academy Award for Best Actor for Berkeley Square and Pygmalion, and won the Volpi Cup for Best Actor for the latter film.

Howard's Second World War activities included acting and filmmaking. He helped to make anti-German propaganda and shore up support for the Allies; two years after his death, the British Film Yearbook described Howard's work as "one of the most valuable facets of British propaganda". He was rumoured to have been involved with British or Allied Intelligence, sparking conspiracy theories regarding his death in 1943 when the Luftwaffe shot down BOAC Flight 777 over the Atlantic (off the coast of Cedeira, A Coruña), on which he was a passenger.

== Early life ==
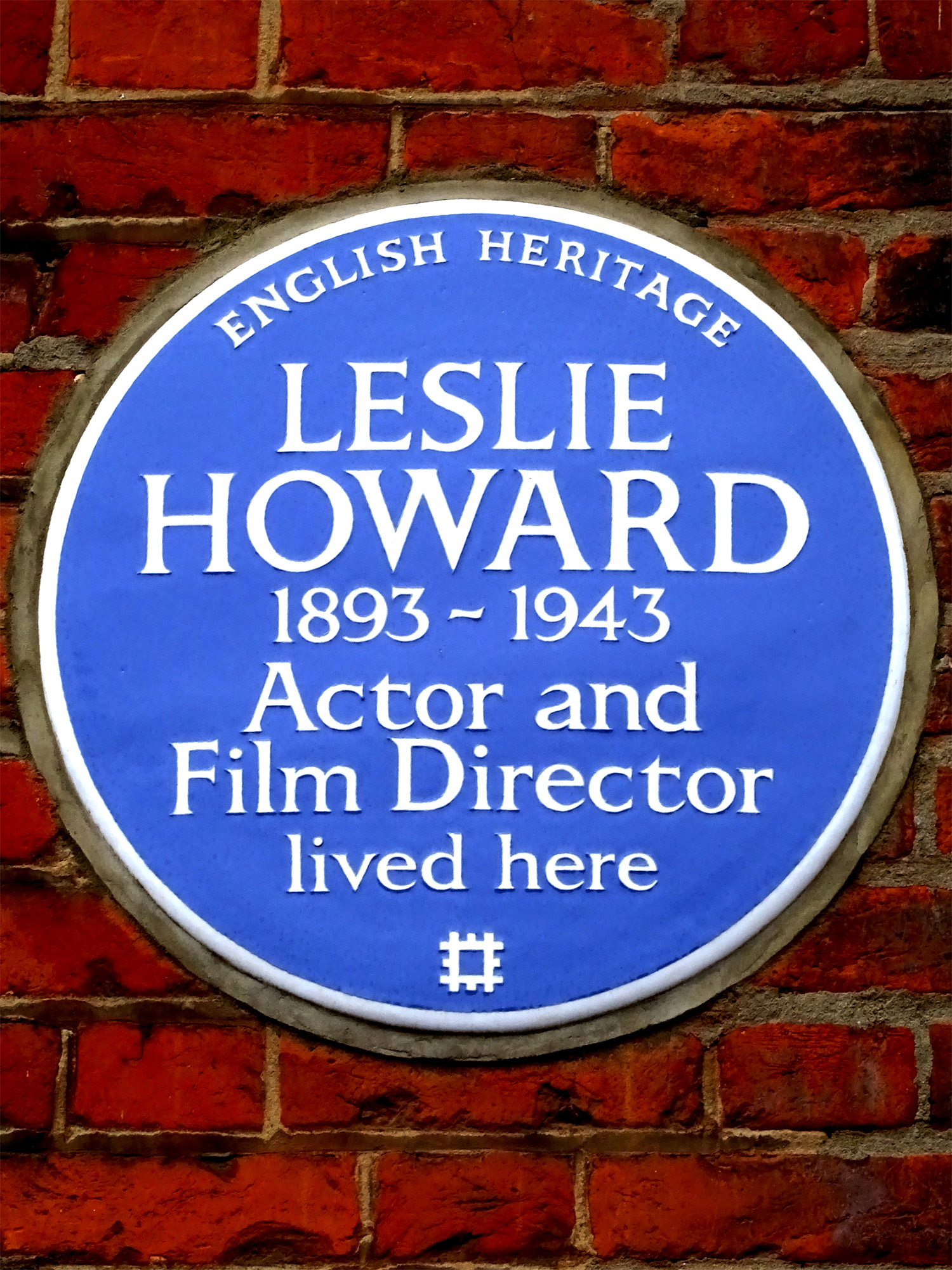
English Heritage blue plaque at 45 Farquhar Road, Upper Norwood, London

Howard was born Leslie Howard Steiner to a British mother, Lilian (née Blumberg), and a Hungarian Jewish father, Ferdinand Steiner, on 3 April 1893 in Forest Hill, London. His younger brother was actor Arthur Howard. Lilian had been raised as a Christian, but she was of partial Jewish ancestry – her paternal grandfather, Ludwig Blumberg, was a Jewish merchant who had married into the English upper-middle classes.

He received his formal education at Alleyn's School, London. Like many others at the time of the First World War, the family anglicised its name, in this case to "Stainer", although Howard's name remained Steiner in official documents, such as his military records.

Howard was a 21-year-old bank clerk in Dulwich when the First World War began; in September 1914, he voluntarily enlisted (under the name Leslie Howard Steiner) as a private with the British Army's Inns of Court Officer Training Corps in London. In February 1915, he received a commission as a subaltern with the 3/1st Northamptonshire Yeomanry, with which he trained in England until 19 May 1916, when he resigned his commission and was medically discharged from the British Army with neurasthenia.

In March 1920, Howard gave public notice in The London Gazette that he had changed his surname, and would thereafter be known by the name of Howard instead of Steiner.

== Theatre career ==
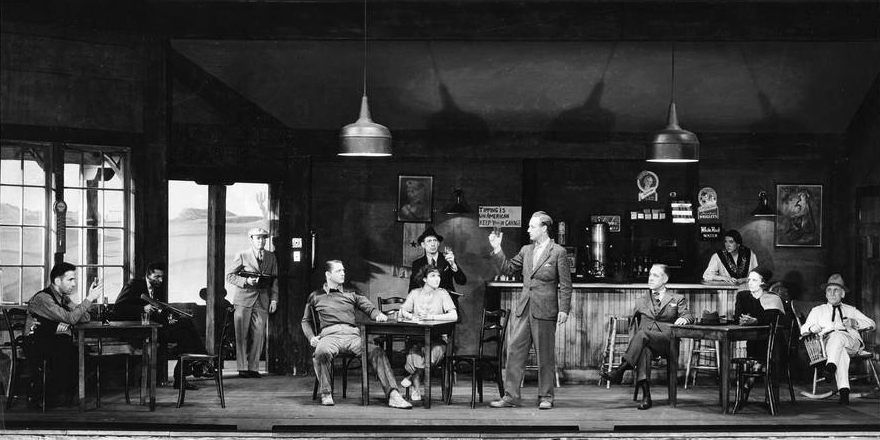
Humphrey Bogart (left) and Leslie Howard (standing center) in the Broadway stage production of The Petrified Forest (1935)

Howard began his professional acting career in regional tours of the comedy plays Peg o' My Heart and Charley's Aunt in 1916–17 and on the London stage in 1917, but had his greatest theatrical success in the United States in Broadway theatre, in plays such as Aren't We All? (1923), Outward Bound (1924) and The Green Hat (1925). He became an undisputed Broadway star in Her Cardboard Lover (1927).

After his success as time traveller Peter Standish in Berkeley Square (1929), Howard launched his Hollywood film career in the film version of Outward Bound, but did not like the experience and vowed never to return to Hollywood. However, he did return, many times—later repeating the Standish role in the 1933 film version of Berkeley Square.

The stage, however, remained an important part of his career. Howard frequently juggled acting, producing, and directing duties in the Broadway productions in which he starred. Howard was also a dramatist and starred in the Broadway production of his own play Murray Hill (1927). He played Matt Denant in John Galsworthy's 1927 Broadway production Escape in which he first made his mark as a dramatic actor. His stage triumphs continued with The Animal Kingdom (1932) and The Petrified Forest (1934). He later repeated both roles in the film versions.

Howard loved to play Shakespeare, but according to producer John Houseman, he could be lazy about memorizing his lines. He first sprang to fame playing in Romeo and Juliet (1936) in the role of the leading man. During the same period, he had the misfortune to open on Broadway in Hamlet (1936), just a few weeks after John Gielgud launched a rival production of the same play that was far more successful with both critics and audiences. Howard's production, lasted for only thirty-nine performances before closing.

When the New York production was completed, Howard took the production on an extended transcontinental tour through the spring of 1937, traveling with the company, substantially recast, by chartered special train. These were Howard's final stage appearances.

The program for the Chicago engagement at the Grand Opera House lists the court ladies as Katherine Cale, Lucia Robinson, "Celeste Holmes", Shirley Zak, Mildred Pearl, Sylvia Hill, Daphne Ingarn and Allace Carroll; the third of these is the future Academy Award winner Celeste Holm, whose surname is misspelled in the program. Wesley Addy had also taken over Fortinbras.

The production toured the United States for several months. Documented engagements include the Grand Opera House, Chicago, opening Christmas night, 25 December 1936, and running through 2 January 1937; The tour reached Los Angeles, where figures from the film industry attended Howard's opening.

The hypertext pioneer Ted Nelson, son of Celeste Holm and the director Ralph Nelson, annotated a scan of the Chicago program with a note that both his parents had been in the company, that his mother was pregnant with him during the tour.

Howard was inducted into the American Theatre Hall of Fame in 1981.

== Film career ==
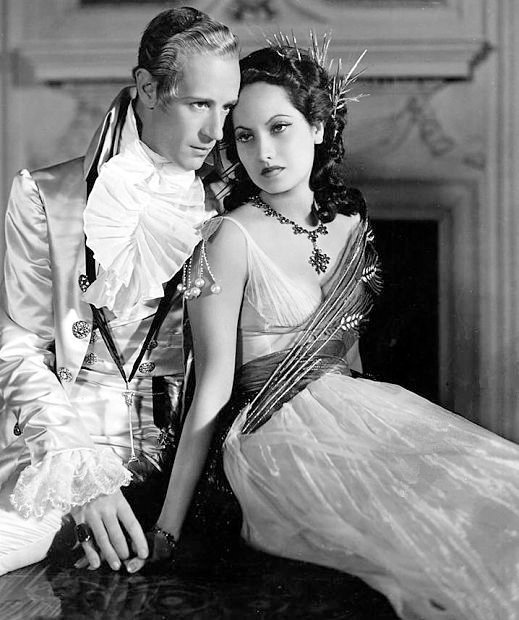
Howard as Sir Percy Blakeney (alter ego of the Scarlet Pimpernel) next to Merle Oberon as Lady Blakeney in The Scarlet Pimpernel (1934)

In 1920, Howard suggested to his friend Adrian Brunel that they form a film production company. After Howard's initial suggestion of calling it British Comedy Films Ltd., the two eventually settled on the name Minerva Films Ltd. The company's board of directors consisted of Howard, Brunel, C. Aubrey Smith, Nigel Playfair and A. A. Milne. One of the company's investors was H. G. Wells. Although the films produced by Minerva—which were written by A. A. Milne—were well received by critics, the company was only offered £200 per film, even though it cost £1,000 to produce, and Minerva Films was short-lived. Early films include four written by A. A. Milne, including The Bump, starring C. Aubrey Smith; Twice Two; Five Pounds Reward; and Bookworms, the latter two starring Howard. Some of these films survive in the archives of the British Film Institute.

In British and Hollywood productions, Howard often played stiff upper-lipped Englishmen. He appeared in the film version of Outward Bound (1930), though in a different role from the one he portrayed on Broadway. He had second billing under Norma Shearer in A Free Soul (1931), which also featured Lionel Barrymore and future Gone With the Wind rival Clark Gable eight years prior to their Civil War masterpiece. He starred in the film version of Berkeley Square (1933), for which he was nominated for an Academy Award for Best Actor. He played the title role in The Scarlet Pimpernel (1934), which is often considered the definitive portrayal.

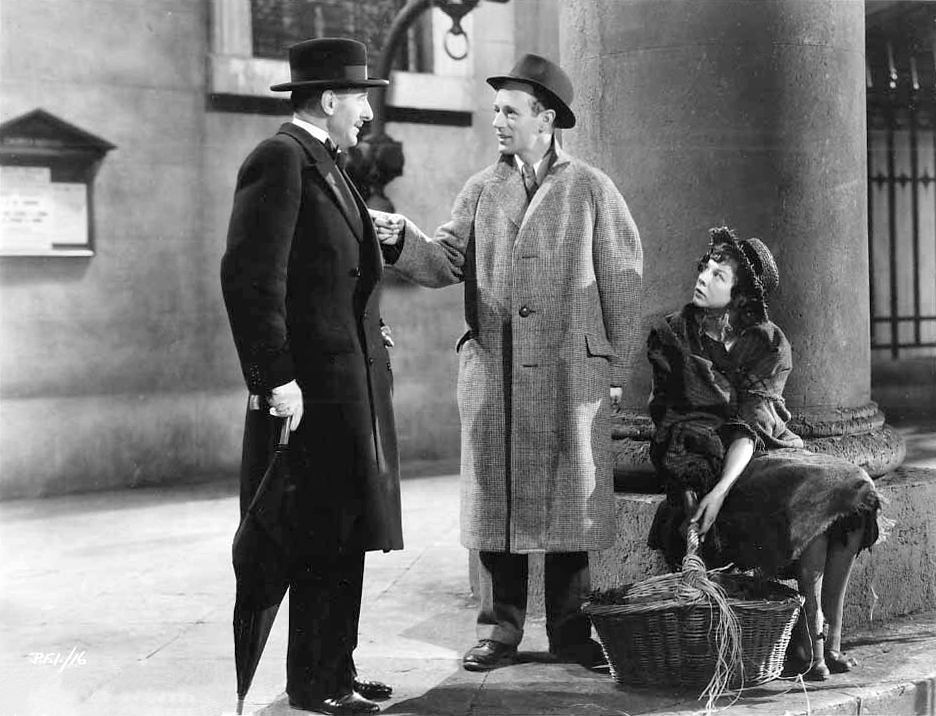
Scott Sunderland, Leslie Howard and Wendy Hiller in Pygmalion (1938), which Howard co-directed

When Howard co-starred with Bette Davis in The Petrified Forest (1936) – having earlier co-starred with her in the film adaptation of W. Somerset Maugham's book Of Human Bondage (1934) – he reportedly insisted that Humphrey Bogart play gangster Duke Mantee, repeating his role from the stage production. This re-launched Bogart's screen career, and the two men became lifelong friends; Bogart and Lauren Bacall later named their daughter "Leslie Howard Bogart" after him. In the same year Howard starred with Norma Shearer in a film version of Shakespeare's Romeo and Juliet (1936).

Bette Davis was again Howard's co-star in the romantic comedy It's Love I'm After (1937) (also co-starring Olivia de Havilland). He played Professor Henry Higgins in the film version of George Bernard Shaw's play Pygmalion (1938), with Wendy Hiller as Eliza, which earned Howard another Academy Award nomination for Best Actor. In 1939, as war approached, he played opposite Ingrid Bergman in Intermezzo; that August, Howard was determined to return to the country of his birth. He was eager to help the war effort, but lost support for a new film, and was obliged to relinquish £20,000 of holdings in the US before he could leave the country.

Howard is perhaps best remembered for his role as Ashley Wilkes in Gone with the Wind (1939), his last American film, but he was uncomfortable with Hollywood, and returned to Britain to help with the Second World War effort. He starred in a number of Second World War films, including 49th Parallel (1941), "Pimpernel" Smith (1941) and The First of the Few (1942, known in the U.S. as Spitfire), the latter two of which he also directed and co-produced. His friend and The First of the Few co-star David Niven said Howard was "...not what he seemed. He had the kind of distraught air that would make people want to mother him. Actually, he was about as naïve as General Motors. Busy little brain, always going."

In 1944, after his death, British exhibitors voted him the second-most popular local star at the box office. His daughter said he was a "remarkable man".

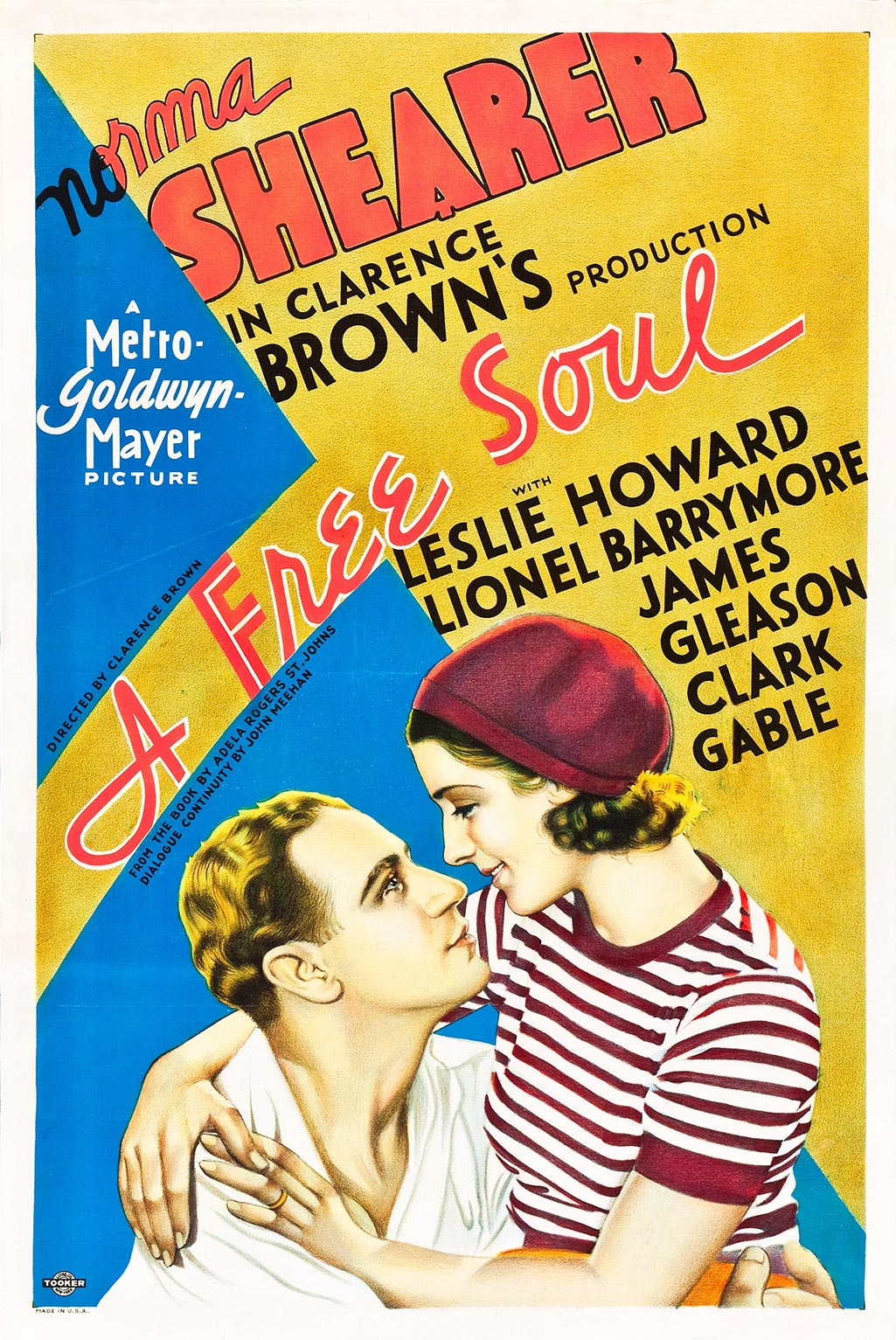
A Free Soul (1931) film poster

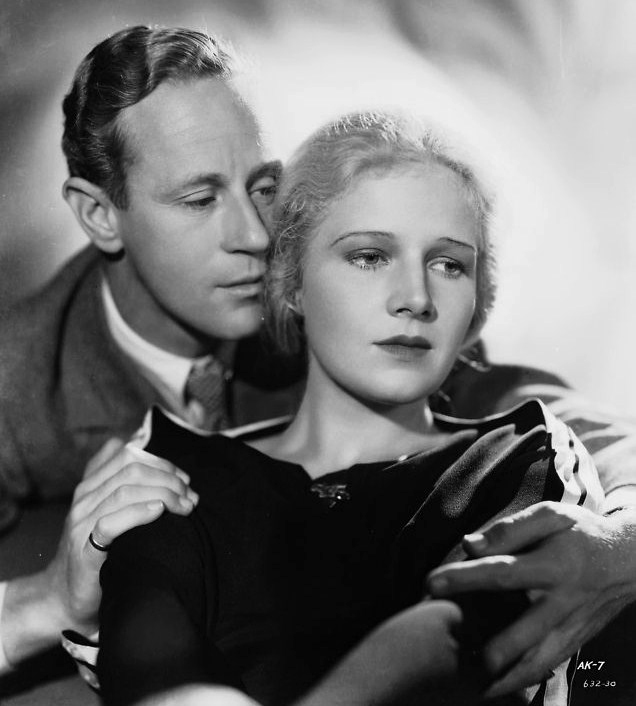
Howard and Ann Harding in The Animal Kingdom (1932)

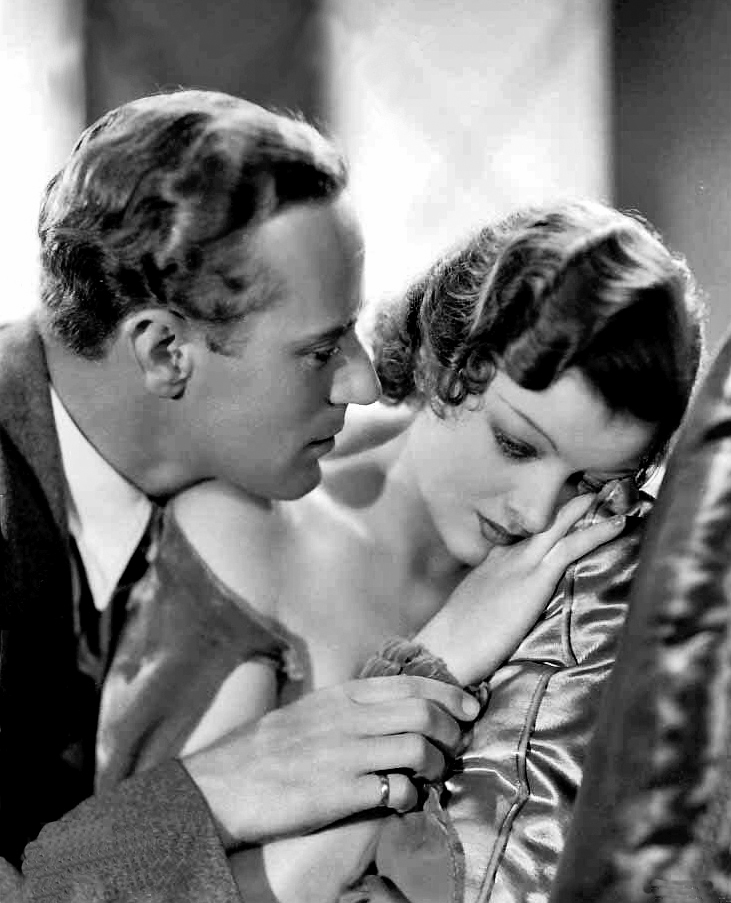
Howard and Myrna Loy in The Animal Kingdom (1932)

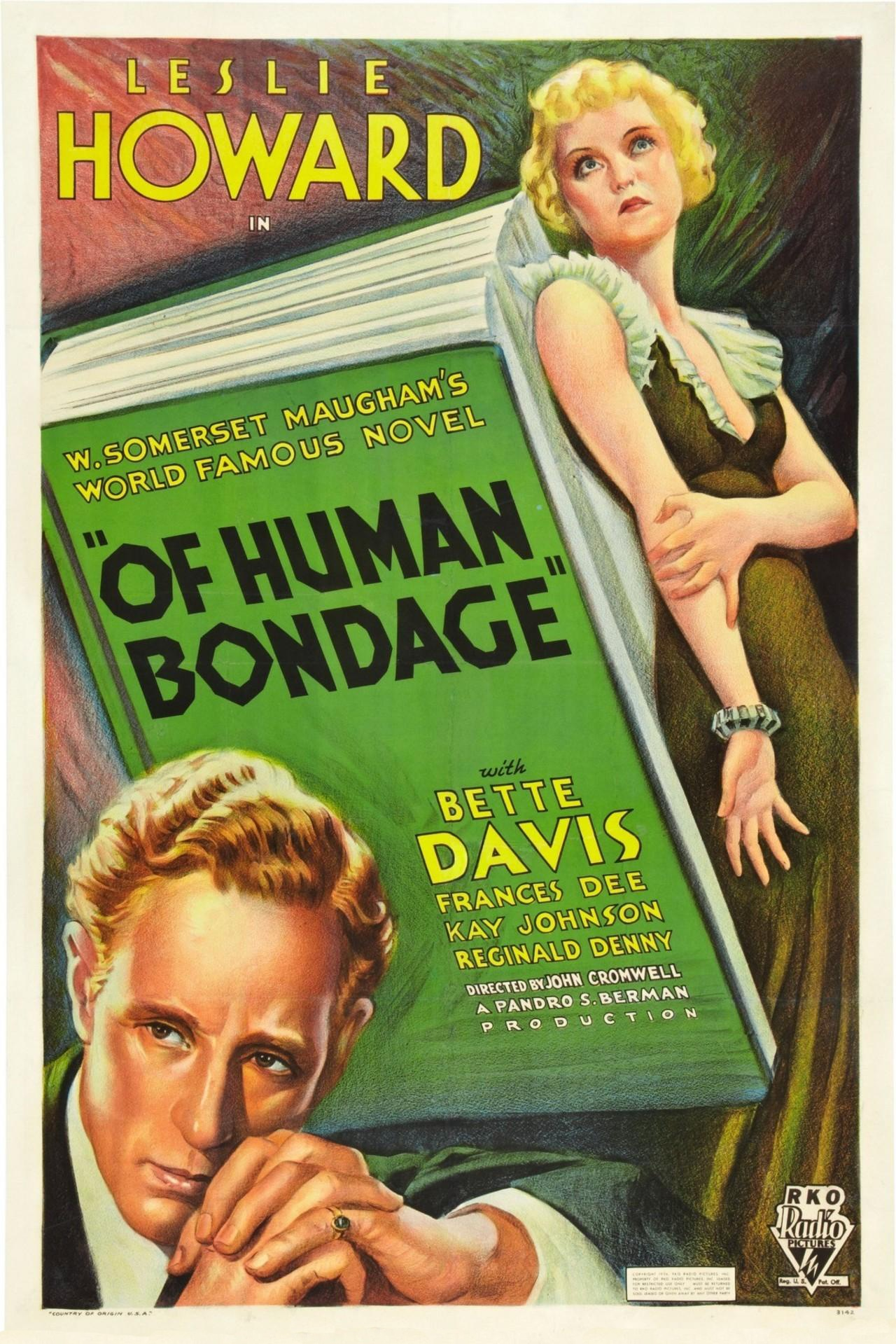
Of Human Bondage (1934) film poster

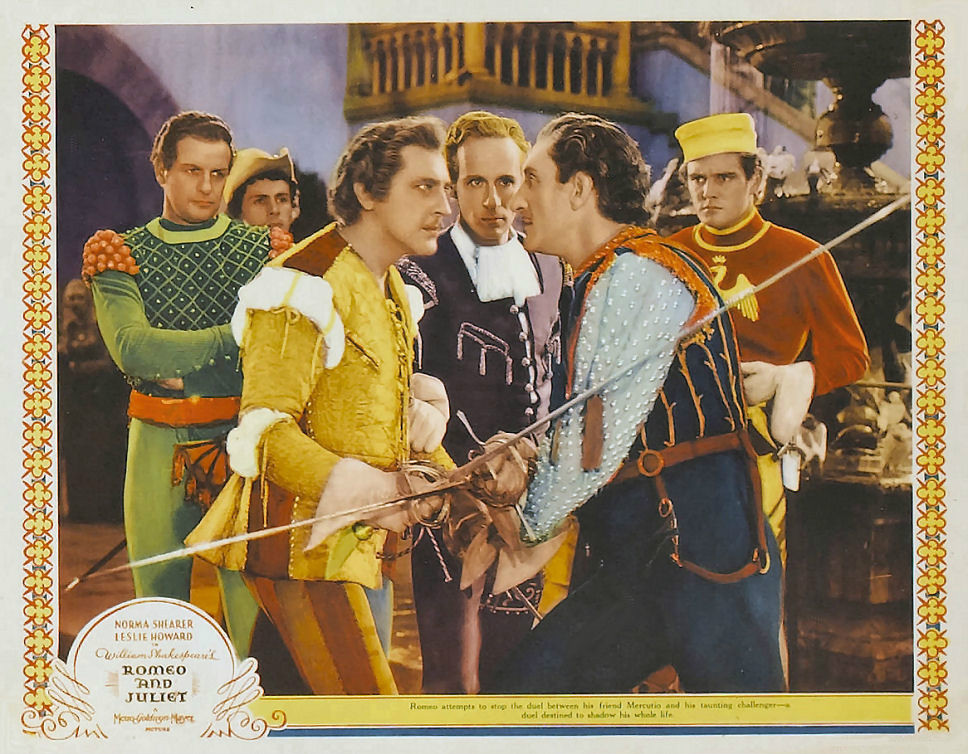
Romeo and Juliet (1936) lobby card with John Barrymore and Basil Rathbone

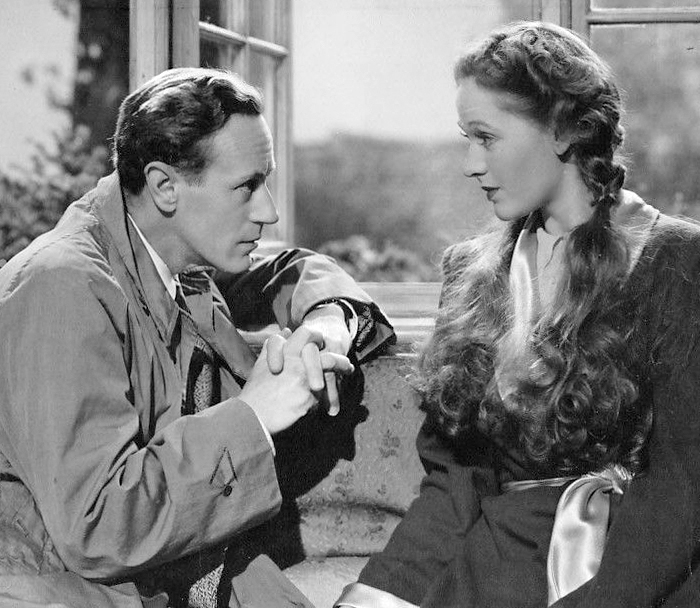
Howard and Rosamund John in The First of the Few (1942)

== Personal life ==
Howard married Ruth Evelyn Martin (1895–1980) on 3 March 1916. Their children were Ronald "Winkie" (1918–1996) and Leslie Ruth "Doodie" (1924–2013).

Leslie appeared with his father and David Niven in the film The First of the Few (1942), playing the role of nurse to Niven's character, and was a major contributor in the filmed biography of his father, Leslie Howard: The Man Who Gave a Damn. Ronald became an actor and played the title role in the television series Sherlock Holmes (1954).

His younger brother, Arthur Howard, was also an actor, primarily in British comedies. His sister Irene Howard was a costume designer and a casting director for Metro-Goldwyn-Mayer. His sister Doris Stainer founded the Hurst Lodge School in Sunningdale, Berkshire, in 1945 and remained its headmistress until the 1970s.

Howard was widely known as a "ladies' man", and he once said that he "didn't chase women but ... couldn't always be bothered to run away". Howard reportedly fathered a daughter – Carol Grace, born 1924 – by Rosheen Marcus; Carol twice married writer William Saroyan and then actor Walter Matthau.

He reportedly had affairs with Tallulah Bankhead when they appeared on stage in the U.K. in Her Cardboard Lover (1927), with Merle Oberon while filming The Scarlet Pimpernel (1934) and with Conchita Montenegro, with whom he had appeared in the film Never the Twain Shall Meet (1931). There were also rumours of affairs with Norma Shearer and Myrna Loy during filming of The Animal Kingdom.

Howard fell in love with Violette Cunnington in 1938 while working on Pygmalion. She was secretary to Gabriel Pascal, who was producing the film; she became Howard's secretary and lover, and they travelled to the U.S. and lived together while he was filming Gone with the Wind and Intermezzo (both 1939). His wife and daughter joined him in Hollywood before production ended on the two films, making his arrangement with Cunnington somewhat uncomfortable for everyone. He moved from the U.S. to Britain with his wife and daughter in August 1939. Cunnington soon followed. She appeared in "Pimpernel" Smith (1941) and The First of the Few (1942) in minor roles under the stage name of Suzanne Clair. She died of pneumonia in her early thirties in 1942, just six months before Howard's death. Howard left her his Beverly Hills house in his will.

The Howard family's home in Britain was Stowe Maries, a 16th-century, six-bedroom farmhouse on the edge of Westcott, Surrey. His will revealed an estate of £62,761, the equivalent of £2 million as of 2025. An English Heritage blue plaque was placed at 45 Farquhar Road, Upper Norwood, London in 2013.

== Death ==
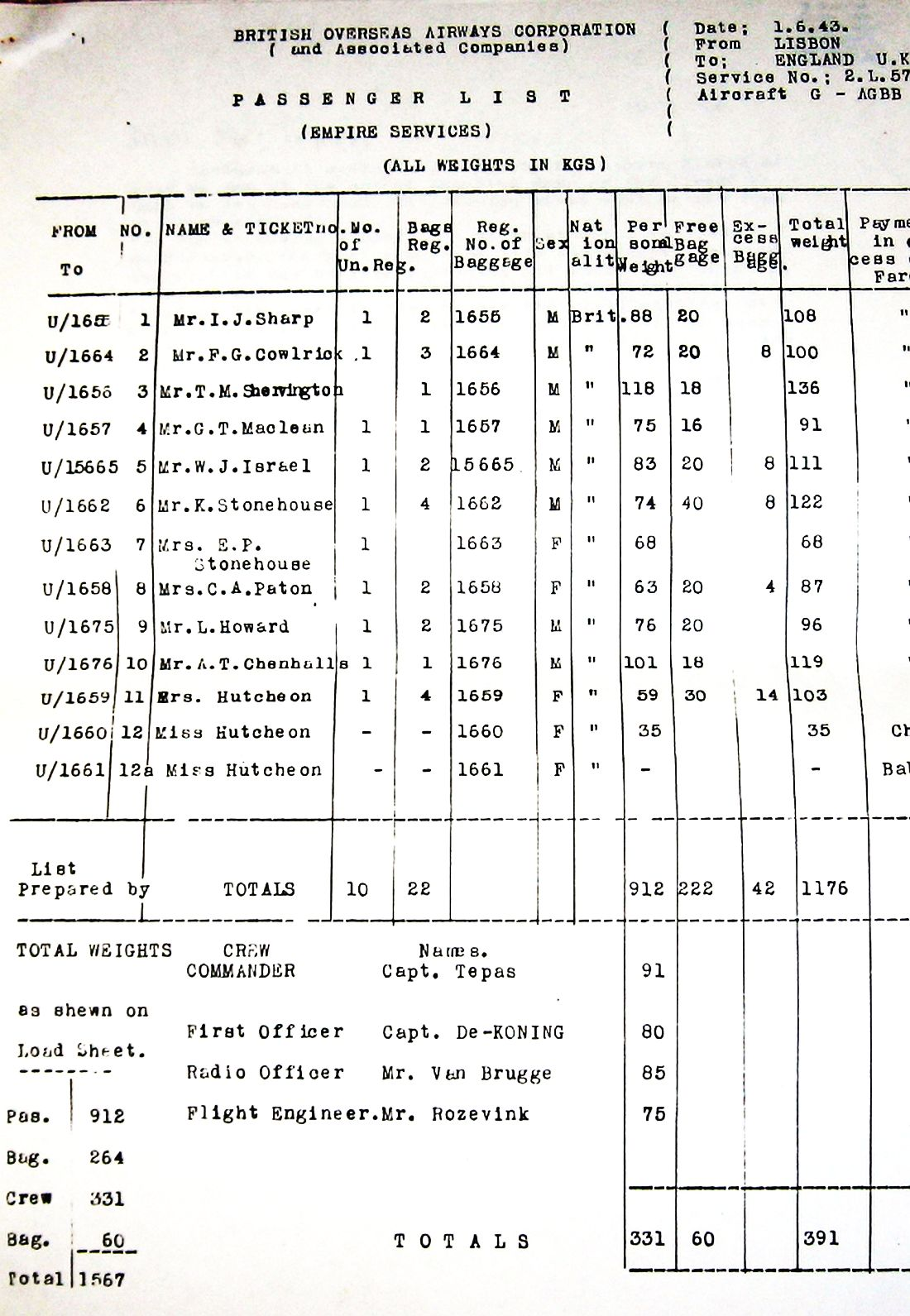
BOAC Flight 777 passenger list

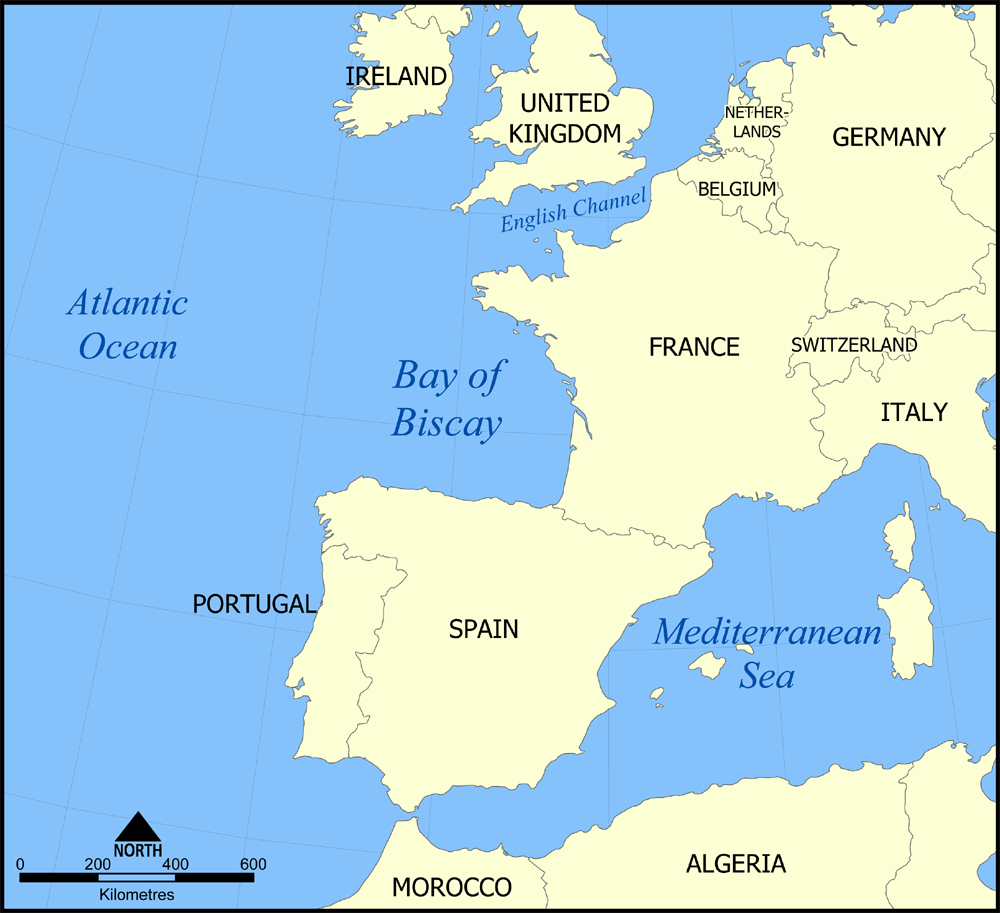
BOAC Flight 777 was shot down over the Bay of Biscay.

In May 1943, Howard travelled to Portugal to promote the British cause. He stayed in Monte Estoril, at the Hotel Atlântico, from 1–4 May, then again between 8–10 May, and again between 25–31 May 1943. The following day, 1 June 1943, he was aboard KLM Royal Dutch Airlines / BOAC Flight 777, "G-AGBB" a Douglas DC-3 flying from Lisbon to Bristol, when it was shot down by a Luftwaffe Junkers Ju 88 C-6 maritime fighter aircraft over the Atlantic (off Cedeira, A Coruña) by fighter-ace Oberleutnant Albrecht Bellstedt. He was among the 17 fatalities, including 4 KLM flight crew.

The BOAC DC-3 Ibis had been operating on a scheduled Lisbon–Whitchurch route throughout 1942–1943 that did not pass over what would commonly be referred to as a war zone. However, by 1942, the Germans considered the region an "extremely sensitive war zone". On two occasions, 15 November 1942, and 19 April 1943, the camouflaged airliner had been attacked by Messerschmitt Bf 110 fighters (a single aircraft and six Bf 110s, respectively) while en route; each time, the pilots escaped by evasive tactics.

On 1 June 1943, "G-AGBB" again came under attack by a swarm of eight V / KG40 Ju 88 C-6 maritime fighters. The DC-3's last radio message indicated it was under fire at 46°54′N 9°37′W.

According to German documents, the DC-3 was shot down at 46°07′N 10°15′W, some 500 miles (800 km) from Bordeaux, France, and 200 miles (320 km) northwest of La Coruña, Spain. Luftwaffe records indicate that the Ju 88 maritime fighters were operating beyond their normal patrol area to intercept and shoot down the aircraft. Oberleutnant Herbert Hintze, Staffelkapitän of 14 Staffel, V. / Kampfgeschwader 40, and based in Bordeaux, stated that his Staffel shot down the DC-3 because it was recognized as an enemy aircraft.

Hintze further stated that his pilots were angry that the Luftwaffe leaders had not informed them of a scheduled flight between Lisbon and the UK, and that had they known, they could easily have escorted the DC-3 to Bordeaux and captured it and all aboard. The German pilots photographed the wreckage floating in the Bay of Biscay, and after the war, copies of these captured photographs were sent to Howard's family.

The following day, a search of the waters on the route was undertaken by "N/461", a Short Sunderland flying boat from No. 461 Squadron RAAF. Near the same coordinates where the DC-3 was shot down, the Sunderland was attacked by eight Ju 88s and, after a furious battle, it managed to shoot down three of the attackers, with an additional three "possibles", before crash-landing at Praa Sands near Penzance. In the aftermath of these two actions, all BOAC flights from Lisbon were re-routed and operated only at night.

The news of Howard's death was published in the same issue of The Times that reported the "death" of Major William Martin, the "Man Who Never Was" created for the ruse involved in Operation Mincemeat.

=== Theories regarding the air attack ===
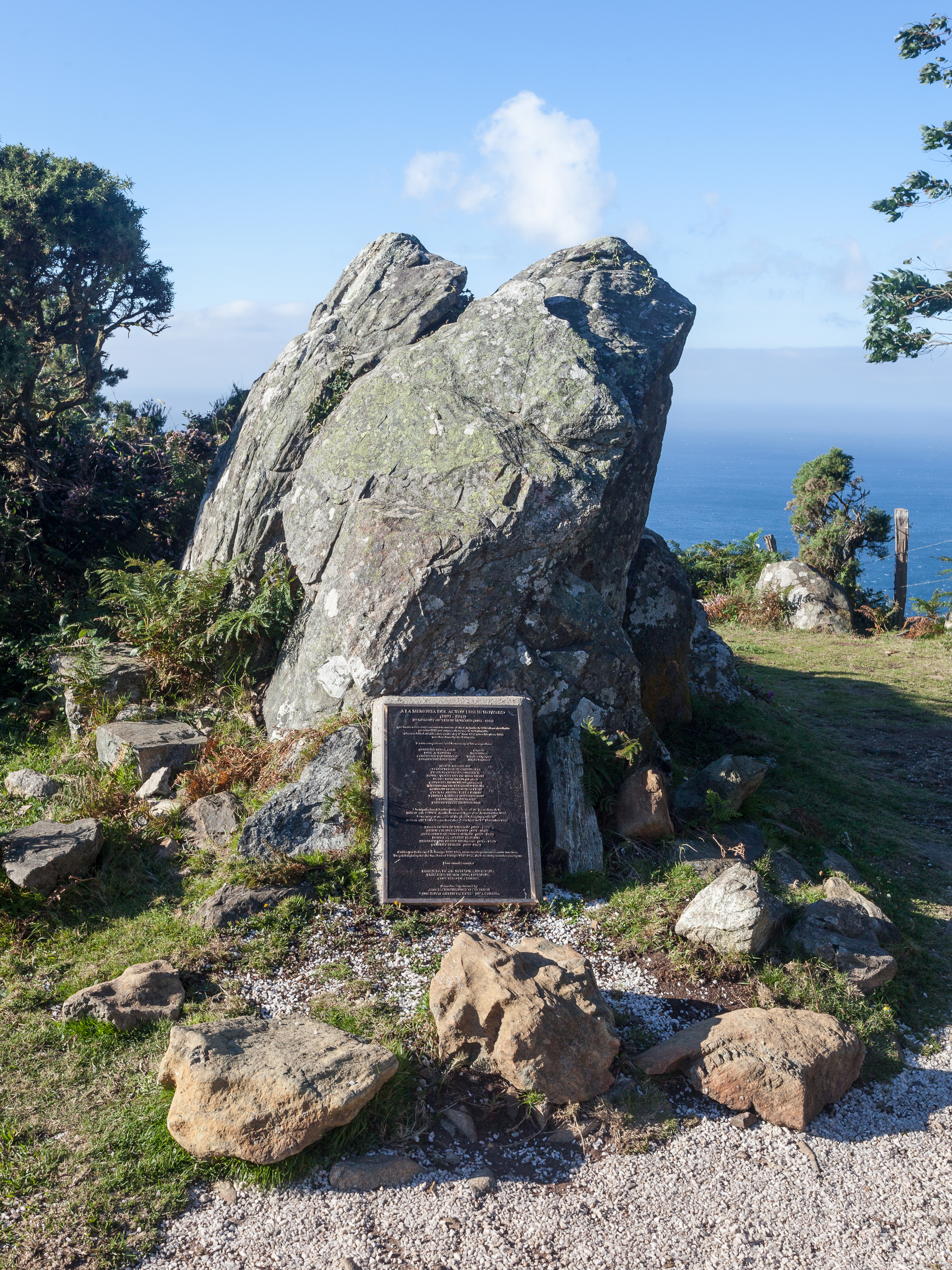
Monument to the memory of Leslie Howard and his companions in Cedeira, Galicia, Spain

A long-standing but ultimately unsupported hypothesis suggested that the Germans believed the British Prime Minister, Winston Churchill, was on board the flight. Churchill's history of World War II suggested that the Germans targeted the commercial flight because the British Prime Minister's "presence in North Africa [for the 1943 Casablanca Conference] had been fully reported", and German agents at the Lisbon airfield mistook a "thickset man smoking a cigar" boarding the plane for Churchill returning to England. This thickset man was Howard's agent, Alfred Chenhalls. The death of the fourteen civilians including Leslie Howard "was a painful shock to me", Churchill wrote; "the brutality of the Germans was only matched by the stupidity of their agents".

Two books focusing on the final flight asserted that the target was Howard instead; that Germans deliberately shot down Howard's DC-3 to demoralise Britain. Howard had been travelling through Spain and Portugal lecturing on film, meeting with local propagandists, and shoring up support for the Allies. The British Film Yearbook for 1945 described his work as "one of the most valuable facets of British propaganda".

The Germans could have suspected even more surreptitious activities, since Portugal, like Switzerland, was a crossroads for internationals and spies from both sides. British historian James Oglethorpe investigated Howard's connection to the secret services. Ronald Howard's book explores the written German orders to the Ju 88 squadron in great detail, as well as British communiqués that purportedly verify intelligence reports indicating a deliberate attack on Howard. These accounts indicate that the Germans were aware of Churchill's real whereabouts at the time and were not so naïve as to believe he would be travelling alone on board an unescorted, unarmed civilian aircraft, which Churchill also acknowledged as improbable. (Coincidentally, Ron Howard's financial advisor, who happened to take the same flight, looked like Churchill; Howard bore a resemblance to Churchill's bodyguard.)

Ronald Howard was convinced the order to shoot down Howard's airliner came directly from Joseph Goebbels, Minister of Public Enlightenment and Propaganda in Nazi Germany, who had been ridiculed in one of Leslie Howard's films, and believed Howard to be the most dangerous British propagandist.

Most of the 13 passengers were either British businessmen with commercial connections to Portugal or lower-ranking British government civil servants. There were also two or three children of British military personnel. Two passengers were bumped off the flight, George and William Cecil, the teenage sons of Cornelia Stuyvesant Vanderbilt, who had been recalled to London from their Swiss boarding school, thus saving their lives.

A 2008 book by Spanish writer José Rey Ximena argues that Howard was on a top-secret mission for Churchill to dissuade Spanish dictator Francisco Franco from joining the Axis powers. Via an old girlfriend, Conchita Montenegro, Howard had contacts with Ricardo Giménez Arnau, a young diplomat in the Spanish Ministry of Foreign Affairs.

Further merely circumstantial background evidence is revealed in Jimmy Burns's 2009 biography of his father, spymaster Tom Burns. In W. Stevenson's biography of Sir William Samuel Stephenson (no relation), who was the senior representative of British Intelligence for the western hemisphere during the Second World War, Stephenson postulated that the Germans knew about Howard's mission and ordered the aircraft shot down. Stephenson further argued Churchill knew in advance of the German intention to shoot down the aircraft but allowed it to proceed to protect the fact the British had broken the German Enigma code. Former CIA agent J.B. Smith recalled in 1957 he was briefed by the National Security Agency on the need for secrecy and Leslie Howard's death had been brought up. The NSA stated Howard knew German fighters would attack the aircraft but went on the plane anyway to protect the British code-breakers' secret.

A secretly taped account by one of the pilots involved appears in a recently declassified transcript of a surreptitiously recorded conversation by two German Luftwaffe prisoners of war talking about the shooting down of Howard's flight, one seems to express pride in his accomplishment, but states clearly he knew nothing of the passengers' identities or importance until hearing an English broadcast later that evening. Asked why he shot down a civil aircraft, he states it was one of four such planes he shot down: "Whatever crossed our path was shot down."

In a 2010 biography of Howard by Elsie Eforgan, she examines then recently available evidence concluding Howard was not a specific target,

There is a monument in San Andrés de Teixido, Spain, dedicated to the victims of the crash. Howard's aircraft was shot down over the sea north of this village.

=== The Mystery of Flight 777 (documentary) ===
The Mystery of Flight 777, by film-maker Thomas Hamilton, explores the circumstances, theories, and myths which have grown around the shooting down of Howard's plane. The film also aims to examine in detail some of the other passengers on board.

== Biographies ==
Howard's premature death preempted any autobiography. A compilation of his writings, Trivial Fond Records, edited by his son Ronald, was published in 1982. This book includes insights into his family life, first impressions of America and Americans when he first moved to the United States to act on Broadway, and his views on democracy in the years prior to and during the Second World War.

Howard's son and daughter each published memoirs of their father: In Search of My Father: A Portrait of Leslie Howard (1984) by Ronald Howard, and A Quite Remarkable Father: A Biography of Leslie Howard (1959) by Leslie Ruth Howard.

Estel Eforgan's Leslie Howard: The Lost Actor is a full-length book biography published in 2010.

=== Leslie Howard: The Man Who Gave a Damn ===
Leslie Howard: A Quite Remarkable Life, as it was initially known, is a film documentary biography produced by Thomas Hamilton of Repo Films. It was shown privately at the NFB Mediatheque, Toronto, Canada in September 2009 for contributors and supporters of the film. Subsequently, re-edited and retitled Leslie Howard: The Man Who Gave a Damn, the documentary was officially launched on 2 September 2011 in an event held at Howard's former home "Stowe Maries" in Dorking, and reported on BBC South News the same day. Lengthy rights negotiations with Warners then delayed further screenings until May 2012.

From 2012 to early 2014, the film remained in limbo due to these issues. However, in early 2014, independent producer Monty Montgomery and Hamilton entered a co-production agreement to complete and release the documentary. This involved a complete re-edit of the documentary, from June 2014 to February 2015, with added material including archival interviews (Michael Powell, John Houseman, Ronald Howard and Irene Howard – all originally filmed in 1980 for the BBC's British Greats series), much historical footage and an additional interview. In addition, a score was commissioned from composer Maria Antal, and considerable post-production sweetening was undertaken on the original material.

This new version of Leslie Howard: The Man Who Gave a Damn was screened as a "work in progress" at the San Francisco Mostly British Film Festival on 14 February 2015, with Hamilton, Tracy Jenkins, and Derek Partridge in attendance. The film won the Best Documentary Film award.

Subsequent screenings (with minor changes to the commentary) took place at the Chichester International Film Festival on 18 August 2015 at the Regent Street Cinema, London, in December 2015, and at the Margaret Mitchell Museum in Atlanta in May 2016 as part of the Britweek Atlanta launch.

Leslie Howard: The Man Who Gave a Damn had its world premiere broadcast on Talking Pictures TV on 27 December 2017, followed by the US TV premiere on Turner Classic Movies on 4 June 2018, which opened a month-long tribute to Howard's films. It airs regularly on Talking Pictures TV and occasionally on Turner Classic Movies.

== Complete filmography ==
Year	Country	Title	Credited as					
Year	Country	Title	Director	Producer	Actor	Screenwriter	Role	Notes
1914	UK	The Heroine of Mons			Yes			Short
1917	UK	The Happy Warrior			Yes		Rollo	
1919	UK	The Lackey and the Lady			Yes		Tony Dunciman	
1920	UK	Twice Two		Yes				Short
1920	UK	The Bump		Yes				Short
1920	UK	Bookworms		Yes	Yes		Richard	Short
1920	UK	Five Pounds Reward		Yes	Yes		Tony Marchmont	Short
1921	UK	Two Many Cooks		Yes				Short
1921	UK	The Temporary Lady		Yes				Short
1930	US	Outward Bound			Yes		Tom Prior	
1931	US	Never the Twain Shall Meet			Yes		Dan Pritchard	
1931	US	A Free Soul			Yes		Dwight Winthrop	
1931	US	Five and Ten			Yes		Bertram "Berry" Rhodes	
1931	US	Devotion			Yes		David Trent	
1932	UK	Service for Ladies			Yes		Max Tracey	
1932	US	Smilin' Through			Yes		Sir John Carteret	
1932	US	The Animal Kingdom			Yes		Tom Collier	
1933	US	Secrets			Yes		John Carlton	
1933	US	Captured!			Yes		Captain Fred Allison	
1933	US	Berkeley Square			Yes		Peter Standish	
1934	US	Of Human Bondage			Yes		Philip Carey	
1934	UK	The Lady Is Willing			Yes		Albert Latour	
1934	US	British Agent			Yes		Stephen "Steve" Locke	
1934	UK	The Scarlet Pimpernel			Yes		Sir Percy Blakeney	
1936	US	The Petrified Forest			Yes		Alan Squier	
1936	US	Romeo and Juliet			Yes		Romeo	
1937	US	It's Love I'm After			Yes		Basil Underwood	
1937	US	Stand-In			Yes		Atterbury Dodd	
1938	UK	Pygmalion	Yes		Yes		Professor Henry Higgins	
1939	US	Intermezzo		Yes	Yes		Holger Brandt	
1939	US	Gone with the Wind			Yes		Ashley Wilkes	
1940	UK	Common Heritage					Narrator	Short
1941	UK	"Pimpernel" Smith	Yes	Yes	Yes		Professor Horatio Smith	
1941	UK	49th Parallel			Yes		Philip Armstrong Scott	
1942	UK	The First of the Few	Yes	Yes	Yes		R. J. Mitchell	
1942	UK	From the Four Corners			Yes	Yes		Short
1942	UK	In Which We Serve			Yes		Narrator	Uncredited
1943	UK	The Gentle Sex	Yes	Yes	Yes		Narrator	Final film role
1943	UK	The Lamp Still Burns		Yes				Final production

== Theatre credits ==
Date	Title	Role	Notes
20 December 1913	Deception	Wilson Smith	Author; Stanley Hall, Upper Norwood, London (amateur production)
20 December 1913	The Perplexed Husband		Stanley Hall, Upper Norwood, London (amateur production)
1916; October/November Tour	Peg o' My Heart	Jerry	England Tour
1916–1917; Winter–Spring Tour	Charley's Aunt	Jack Chesney	England Tour
10 June 1917	The Tidings Brought to Mary	the Apprentice	Strand Theatre, London
1917; Summer–Fall Tour	Under Cover	Monty Vaughan	England Tour
14 February – 30 March 1918	The Freaks	Ronald Herrick	New Theatre, London
19 March 1918	Romanticismo	Marquis Giacomino d'Arfo	Comedy Theatre, London
14 April 1918	Romanticismo	Marquis Giacomino d'Arfo	King's Hall, London
1 April 1918	The Morals of Vanda	Leonard Mortimer	Grand Theatre, Croydon, London
6 May 1918	Box B	Captain Robert Stroud	London Coliseum, London
3 June 1918	Sinners	Robert Ransom	Prince of Wales Theatre, Birmingham, England
20 July 1918 – Spring 1919	The Title	John Culver	Royalty Theatre, London
3 April 1919	Our Mr. Hepplewhite	Lord Bagley	Criterion Theatre, London
24 November 1919	Just A Wife Or Two	Victor Hamilton	West Pier, Brighton, England
5 January 1920	Mr. Pim Passes By	Brian Strange	New Theatre, London and The Garrick Theatre, London
10 February 1920	The Young Person in Pink	Lord Stevenage	Prince of Wales Theatre, London
16 February 1920	Kitty Breaks Loose	Jack Wilson/Sir John Wilde	Duke of York's Theatre, London
9 June 1920	East Is West	Billy Benson	Lyric Theatre, London
July 1920	Rosalind of the Farmyard	Captain L'Estrange	Shaftesbury Theatre, London
1 November 1920 – January 1921	Just Suppose	Honourable Sir Calverton Shipley	Henry Miller's Theatre, New York
10 December 1920	P's and Q's	Charley Stark	Morosco Theatre, New York
10 October – October 1921	The Wren	Hugh Roddy	Gaiety Theatre, New York
22 December 1921 – February 1922	Danger	Percy Sturgess	39th Street Theatre, New York
14 March – June 1922	The Truth About Blayds	Oliver Blayds	Booth Theatre, New York
24 August – September 1922	A Serpent's Tooth	Jerry Middleton	Little Theatre, New York
14 November – December 1922	The Romantic Age	Gervase Mallory	Comedy Theatre, New York
25 December 1922 – January 1923	The Lady Cristilinda	Martini	Broadhurst Theatre, New York
20 February – April 1923	Anything Might Happen	Hal Turner	Comedy Theatre, New York
21 May – June 1923	Aren't We All?	The Honourable William Tatham	Gaiety Theatre, New York
7 January – May 1924	Outward Bound	Henry	Ritz Theatre, New York
25 August – December 1924	The Werewolf	Paolo Moreira	49th Street Theatre, New York
13 January – February 1925	Shall We Join the Ladies?	Mr. Preen	Empire Theatre, New York
13 January – February 1925	Isabel	Peter Graham	Empire Theatre, New York
15 September 1925 – February 1926	The Green Hat	Napier Harpenden	Broadhurst Theatre, New York
27 July 1926	The Way You Look At It	Bobby Rendon	Queen's Theatre, London
20 December 1926	Mayfair		Broad Street Theatre, Newark (Out-of-Town Tryout)
21 March – August 1927	Her Cardboard Lover	Andre Sallicel	Empire Theatre, New York
29 September – October 1927	Murray Hill	Wrigley	Author; Bijou Theatre, New York
26 October 1927 – March 1928	Escape	Matt Denant	Booth Theatre, New York
June 1928	Tell Me the Truth (A Bit of Tomfoolery)	—	Author; Ambassadors Theatre, London
21 August 1928	Her Cardboard Lover	Andre Sallicel	Lyric Theatre, London
6 March 1929	Berkeley Square	Peter Standish	Lyric Theatre, London
26 August 1929 – 31 August 1929	Candle Light	Josef	Empire Theatre, Southampton, England
30 September 1929 – January 1930	Candle Light	Josef	Empire Theatre, New York
4 November 1929 – May 1930	Berkeley Square	Peter Standish	Co-producer, co-director Lyceum Theatre, New York
8 February – February 1930	Out of a Blue Sky	—	Author, director Booth Theatre, New York
12 January – June 1932	The Animal Kingdom	Tom Collier	Co-producer; Broadhurst Theatre, New York
31 March – April 1932	We Are No Longer Children	—	Co-director; Booth Theatre, New York
19–28 October 1933	This Side Idolatry	William Shakespeare	Producer; Lyric Theatre, London
July 1934	Elizabeth Sleeps Out	—	Author; Whitehall Theatre, London
7 January – June 1935	The Petrified Forest	Alan Squier	Co-producer; Broadhurst Theatre, New York
20 April – May 1936	Elizabeth Sleeps Out	—	Author; Comedy Theatre, New York
10 November – December 1936	Hamlet	Hamlet	Director, producer Imperial Theatre, New York
27 September 1937	Alias Mrs. Jones	—	Author, director Little Theatre, Bristol, England
May 1938	Here's to Our Enterprise		Lyceum Theatre, London
25 September 1942	Cathedral Steps	Horatio Nelson	St. Paul's Cathedral, London

== Radio career ==
Howard was not only an accomplished actor on stage and screen, but appeared many times on radio as well. He began his career on radio in the early 1930s when he performed dramatic readings for The Yardley Program. Not much is known about the programme because the recordings have been lost, but references to it can be found in fan magazines of the time, and the show is listed in The New York Times radio programme guide. Howard was also a guest performer on such shows as The Rudy Vallee Show/Fleischmann's Yeast Hour, Lux Radio Theatre, The Silver Theatre, The Magic Key of RCA, Your Hit Parade, and Kraft Music Hall with Bing Crosby.

In May 1935, Howard and his daughter, Leslie Ruth Howard, aged 10, appeared on The Rudy Vallee Show/Fleischmann's Yeast Hour in "The Enchanted Forest" scene from James M. Barrie's Dear Brutus. The show was so popular with audiences that for the first time in the show's history an encore was performed six weeks later, on 27 June 1935. That show survives and can be heard on the Old Time Radio Library's website.

At the end of 1936, Howard began appearing as a guest on Eddie Cantor's Texaco Town. It took six months and three appearances before he and Cantor finally delivered the punchline in the skit "Three Pairs of Rubbers". Howard's appearances were not limited to guest spots. Beginning in October 1935 and into the spring of 1936, Howard had his own show on CBS, a serial titled The Amateur Gentleman. The show eventually became Leslie Howard's Matinee with each week bringing a new adapted play popular at the time to radio listeners. Howard also appeared in Columbia Presents Shakespeare as Benedick in the play Much Ado About Nothing with Rosalind Russell in the summer of 1937. He produced two shows for Lux Radio Theatre: Lady for A Day, starring May Robson and Guy Kibbee, and The Life of Émile Zola, starring Paul Muni and Josephine Hutchinson.

His last known radio appearance in the United States before returning to Britain to help with the war effort was the Radio Tribute to the King and Queen, in which dozens of British stars performed skits while King King George VI and Queen Elizabeth listened with President Roosevelt and Mrs. Roosevelt from Hyde Park. Howard's appearances on the BBC's Britain Speaks were broadcast to the United States from 16 July 1940, after the onset of World War II, urging America to enter the war in support of Britain. By January 1941, Howard had completed 27 broadcasts of Britain Speaks. He also appeared on a panel programme for the BBC called The Brains Trust.

Most of Howard's radio broadcasts have been lost, but a few have survived.

== Radio credits ==
Date	Network	Show title	Episode title	Episode number	Appearing	Listen (shows filed under show title)
27 March 1932 to 8 May 1932	NBC Networks	Yardley Program (Note: Leslie Howard photo with caption: "Leslie Howard, the favorite of stage and screen, whose brilliant dramatic readings are a delightful feature of the popular Yardley program". "The Radio Hall of Fame", Silver Screen, July 1932 (pages missing from archived copy of magazine, but photo with caption available on the internet))	"Yardley Program"		Leslie Howard Reading, London String Quartet	
1933 or 1934 (Note: It is known that Howard appeared on Rudy Vallee's show sometime in 1933 or 1934 because he made a reference to his appearance on the show that aired on 14 February 1935, stating he had been there "a year ago." Two pictures exist: the first with Howard, Margaret Sullavan, William Gargan, and Rudy Vallee standing in front of the audience holding scripts; the second shows Howard, Sullavan, and Vallee standing with scripts in front of an NBC microphone. It is unlikely that Howard appeared on 16 November 1933 show when Margaret Sullavan appeared because he had appeared in This Side Idolatry in London during October 1933, and wouldn't have been in the United States at that time. Also, Howard is not introduced as part of the show's cast. The other show Margaret Sullavan appeared on in the right timeframe aired on 14 June 1934. This was Episode 243, "Coquette", and is lost. Episode listings, however, show guests as Willie and Eugene Howard, not Leslie Howard.)	NBC	Rudy Vallee – Fleischmann's Yeast Hour			Leslie Howard, Margaret Sullavan	
23 May 1934	NBC	Without the Benefit of Clergy	"Without the Benefit of Clergy"		Leslie Howard	
9 December 1934	NBC	Lux Radio Theatre	Berkeley Square	9	Leslie Howard, Helen Chandler	
14 February 1935	NBC	Rudy Vallee – Fleischmann's Yeast Hour	"A Minuet"	278	Leslie Howard, Merle Oberon	Old Time Radio Library
31 March 1935	NBC	Lux Radio Theatre	The Romantic Age	25	Leslie Howard, Sidney Fox	
16 May 1935	NBC	Rudy Vallee – Fleischmann's Yeast Hour	Dear Brutus	291	Leslie Howard, Leslie Ruth Howard	
27 June 1935	NBC	Rudy Vallee – Fleischmann's Yeast Hour	Dear Brutus	297	Leslie Howard, Leslie Ruth Howard	Old Time Radio Library
6 October 1935 to 1 December 1935	CBS	The Amateur Gentleman (Note: Show began on 6 October 1935 as a serial, The Amateur Gentleman. Each week brought a new episode of that story. However, the format was changed to present a new play adapted for radio each week beginning 8 December 1935. Play titles appeared in The New York Times, Radio Program Section.)	The Amateur Gentleman		Leslie Howard, Elizabeth Love	
8 December 1935	CBS	Play: Dear Brutus	Dear Brutus		Leslie Howard, Leslie Ruth Howard	
22 December 1935	CBS	Play: Purple and Fine Linen	Purple and Fine Linen		Leslie Howard	
29 December 1935	CBS	Play: An Unfinished Story	An Unfinished Story		Leslie Howard, Paula Winslowe	
5 January 1936	CBS	Play: Her Cardboard Lover	Her Cardboard Lover		Leslie Howard	
12 January 1936	CBS	Play: The Admirable Crichton	The Admirable Crichton		Leslie Howard	
26 January 1936	CBS	Leslie Howard's Matinee	There's Always Juliet		Leslie Howard	
2 February 1936	CBS	Leslie Howard's Matinee	The Guardsman		Leslie Howard	
9 February 1936	CBS	Leslie Howard's Matinee	Murray Hill		Leslie Howard	
16 February 1936	CBS	Leslie Howard's Matinee	Journey's End		Leslie Howard	
23 February 1936	CBS	Leslie Howard's Matinee	Springtime for Henry		Leslie Howard	
8 March 1936	CBS	Leslie Howard's Matinee	The Scarlet Pimpernel		Leslie Howard	
15 March 1936	CBS	Leslie Howard's Matinee	Raffles		Leslie Howard	
22 March 1936	CBS	Leslie Howard's Matinee	Just Suppose		Leslie Howard	
29 March 1936	CBS	Leslie Howard's Matinee	The Second Man		Leslie Howard	
5 April 1936	CBS	The Magic Key of RCA	"Galsworthy's Justice"	026	Leslie Howard	Old Time Radio Library
17 September 1936	NBC	Rudy Vallee – Fleischmann's Yeast Hour	"The Miraculous Visitor"	7	Leslie Howard, Beatrice Barrett, Carl Hubble	
6 December 1936	CBS	Eddie Cantor's Texaco Town	"Three Pairs of Rubbers"	12	Leslie Howard	Old Time Radio Library
14 February 1937	CBS	Eddie Cantor's Texaco Town	Hamlet	22	Leslie Howard	Old Time Radio Library
19 May 1937	CBS	Your Hit Parade	Interview and Lucky Strike ad		Leslie Howard	Transcript, Variety Radio Directory
30 May 1937	CBS	Eddie Cantor's Texaco Town	Aired in England	37	Leslie Howard	Old Time Radio Library
21 June 1937	CBS	Lux Radio Theatre	Monsieur Beaucaire	138	Leslie Howard, Elissa Landi	Old Time Radio Library
19 July 1937	CBS	Columbia Presents Shakespeare	Much Ado About Nothing	2nd show in series	Leslie Howard, Rosalind Russell	Old Time Radio Library
2 January 1938	BBC		Hamlet		Leslie Howard	
28 November 1938	CBS	Lux Radio Theatre	Interference	195	Leslie Howard, Mary Astor, Herbert Marshall	
12 December 1938	CBS	Lux Radio Theatre	The Scarlet Pimpernel	197	Leslie Howard, Olivia de Havilland	Old Time Radio Library
15 December 1938	NBC	The Kraft Music Hall			Leslie Howard, Jane Bryan	
8 January 1939	CBS	The Silver Theatre	A Study in Triangles	028	Leslie Howard, Rita Johnson	Old Time Radio Library
26 March 1939	CBS	The Gulf Screen Guild Theater	Never in This World	012	Leslie Howard, Kay Francis, Mary Nash, Irving Pichel, Virginia Weidler, Morgan Wallace	Screen Guild Theater
1 May 1939	CBS	Lux Radio Theatre	Lady for a Day	217	May Robson, Guy Kibbee, Warren William, Jean Parker	Old Time Radio Library – Lux
8 May 1939	CBS	Lux Radio Theatre	The Life of Émile Zola	218	Paul Muni, Josephine Hutchinson	Old Time Radio Library – Lux
11 June 1939	NBC	"Radio Tribute to the King and Queen"	Goodbye, Mr. Chips segment		Leslie Howard, Greer Garson	"Tribute To Their Majesties"

== Bibliography ==
- Churchill, W. (1950). The Second World War: The Hinge of Fate. Vol. 4. Boston, MA: Houghton Mifflin. p. 830.
- Colvin, Ian (2007). Flight 777: The Mystery of Leslie Howard. London: Evans Brothers. p. 187..
- Covington, Howard E. Jr. (2006). Lady on the Hill: How Biltmore Estate Became an American Icon. Hoboken, New Jersey: Wiley. ISBN 978-0-471-75818-1..
- Croall, Jonathan (2001). Gielgud: A Theatrical Life. Continuum. ISBN 978-0-8264-1333-8.
- Dale-Harris, Leslie Ruth Howard (1959). A Quite Remarkable Father. Longmans, Green and Company.
- Eforgan, Estel (2010). 'Leslie Howard: The Lost Actor. London: Vallentine Mitchell. ISBN 978-0-85303-941-9.
- Goss, Chris (2001). Bloody Biscay: The Story of the Luftwaffe's Only Long Range Maritime Fighter Unit, V Gruppe/Kampfgeschwader 40, and Its Adversaries, 1941-1944. Crecy Publishing. ISBN 978-0-947554-87-3.
- Hamilton, Thomas (11 February 2016). Leslie Howard: The Man Who Gave a Damn. Dorking, Surrey, England, UK: Repo Films. Event occurs at 84 minutes.
- Lochery, Neill (2011). Lisbon: War in the Shadows of the City of Light, 1939–1945. New York, NY: Public Affairs. pp. 156, 159.
- Howard, Leslie Ruth (1 January 1982). Howard, Ronald (ed.). Trivial fond records. W. Kimber. p. 187. ISBN 978-0718304188.
- Howard, Ronald (1984). In Search of My Father: A portrait of Leslie Howard. London: St. Martin's Press. ISBN 0-312-41161-8.
- Neitzel, Sönke; Welzer, Harald (2013). Soldiers: German POWs on fighting, killing, and dying. Translated by Chase, Jefferson. New York, NY: Vintage Books. p. 139.
- Noble, Peter (1945). British Film Yearbook for 1945. London: The British Broadcasting Corporation.
- Richards, Jeffrey (2014). Swordsmen of the Screen: From Douglas Fairbanks to Michael York. Routledge. p. 163.
- Rosevink, Ben; Hintze, Herbert (July 1991). "Howard's end". FlyPast. No. 120. London, UK: Key Publishing Ltd.
- Sklar, Robert (1994). City Boys: Cagney, Bogart, Garfield. Princeton University Press. ISBN 978-0-691-00614-7.
- Smith, Joseph Burkholder (1981). Portrait of a Cold Warrior. Ballantine Books. ISBN 978-0-345-29839-3.
- Stevenson, William (2000) [1976]. A Man Called Intrepid: The Incredible WWII Narrative of the Hero Whose Spy Network and Secret Diplomacy Changed the Course of History. Guilford, Delaware: Lyons Press. ISBN 1-58574-154-X..
- Rey-Ximena, José (2008). El vuelo de Ibis [The Flight of the Ibis] (in Spanish). Madrid: Ed. Facta. ISBN 978-84-934875-1-5.
