= Hardwood Dreams =

- DVD cover
- Directed by: Michael Tollin
- Written by: Michael Tollin
- Produced by: Brian Robbins (producer); Michael Tollin (executive producer)
- Starring: Morningside High School basketball players Stais Boseman, Dwight Curry, Dominic Ellison, Sean Harris and Corey Saffold; Wesley Snipes (narrator)
- Release date: 1993
- Running time: 45 minutes
- Country: United States
- Language: English

Hardwood Dreams is a 1993 basketball sports documentary written, directed and produced by Michael Tollin and narrated by Wesley Snipes. It follows five Morningside High School (MHS) seniors during their last high school basketball season, as they dream of the National Basketball Association (NBA).

== Cast ==
Morningside High School basketball players

- Stais Boseman
- Dwight Curry
- Dominic Ellison
- Sean Harris
- Corey Saffold

== Awards ==
The documentary film won the Crystal Heart Award during the Heartland Film Festival in 1993.

== Hardwood Dreams: Ten Years Later ==
Hardwood Dreams: Ten Years Later
- Directed by: Fredric Golding
- Written by: Fredric Golding
- Produced by: Fredric Golding, Brian Robbins, Michael Tollin(producers); Bill McCullough (co-producer), Alex Terrazas (associate producer)
- Starring: Morningside High School basketball players Wesley Snipes (narrator)
- Edited by: Peter Fandetti
- Music by: Bill McCullough, John Wiggins
- Release date: 2004
- Country: United States
- Language: English

A decade later, and in a 2004 TV sequel, Hardwood Dreams: Ten Years Later, Wesley Snipes narrates what happened to the young players who appeared in the original documentary, namely Stais Boseman, Dwight Curry, Dominic Ellison, Sean Harris and Corey Saffold.

== See also ==
- List of basketball films
