= Incident in San Francisco =

- Written by: Robert Dozier
- Story by: J. E. Brown
- Directed by: Don Medford
- Starring: Richard Kiley; Leslie Nielsen; Dean Jagger
- Theme music composer: Patrick Williams
- Country of origin: United States
- Original language: English

Production
- Producers: Arthur Fellows; Adrian Samish
- Cinematography: William W. Spencer
- Editor: Richard K. Brockway
- Running time: 100 minutes
- Production company: Quinn Martin Productions

Original release
- Network: ABC
- Release: February 28, 1971

Incident in San Francisco is a 1971 American thriller television film directed by Don Medford that aired on ABC. It stars Richard Kiley, Leslie Nielsen and Dean Jagger.

== Cast ==
- Richard Kiley as Robert Harmon
- Leslie Nielsen as Lt. Brubaker
- Dean Jagger as Sam Baldwin
- John Marley as Mario Cianelli
- Tim O'Connor as Arthur Andrews
- Phyllis Thaxter as Lois Harmon
- Ruth Roman as Sophia Cianelli
- David Opatoshu as Herschel Roman
- Claudia McNeil as Odessa Carter
- Tracy Reed as Penny Carter
- Julius Harris as Henry Carter
- Tom Nardini as Alfred Cianelli
- Christopher Connelly as Jeff Marshall
- Ken Lynch as Det. Hanson
