= Arthur Howard =

British actor (1910–1995)

Arthur Howard (born Arthur John Steiner; 18 January 1910 – 18 June 1995) was an English stage, film and television actor.

== Life and career ==
Born in Camberwell, London, Howard was the younger son of Lilian (née Blumberg) and Ferdinand "Frank" Steiner. His brother was the film actor Leslie Howard and his sister the casting director Irene Howard. He married the actress Jean Compton Mackenzie (a daughter of the actor Frank Compton) in 1936 and they had a son together, the stage actor Alan Howard.

Arthur appeared in several television programmes such as Whack-O, a school comedy in which he played the hapless assistant headmaster Pettigrew to Jimmy Edwards's headmaster, and he was in the 1960 film version Bottoms Up. He appeared in many films, including American Friends and The Magnificent Seven Deadly Sins, and had the small role of Cavendish in the James Bond film Moonraker.

In 1961 he was arrested for importuning and spent a week in prison. He died in Westminster, London. He is buried in the East London Cemetery.

== Filmography ==
- The Private Life of Henry VIII (1933) – Kitchen Helper (uncredited)
- The Lady Is Willing (1934) – Dr. Germont
- Frieda (1947) – First Official
- So Well Remembered (1947) – Politician (uncredited)
- The Mark of Cain (1947) – Clerk of the Court (uncredited)
- London Belongs to Me (1948) – Mr. Chinkwell
- The Passionate Friends (1949) – Smith – the Butler
- Passport to Pimlico (1949) – Bassett
- Private Angelo (1949) – (uncredited)
- Stage Fright (1950) – Groves – Charlotte's Butler (uncredited)
- The Happiest Days of Your Life (1950) – Anthony Ramsden
- Last Holiday (1950) – Burden
- State Secret (1950) – Clubman
- Cage of Gold (1950) – Registry office bridegroom (uncredited)
- Dick Barton at Bay (1950) – Minor Role (uncredited)
- Emergency Wedding (1950) – Minor Role (uncredited)
- Laughter in Paradise (1951) – Businessman on train (uncredited)
- The Man in the White Suit (1951) – Roberts
- Lady Godiva Rides Again (1951) – Soap publicity man
- Never Look Back (1952) – Charles Vaughan
- Moulin Rouge (1952) – Dancing Master (uncredited)
- Cosh Boy (1953) – Registrar (uncredited)
- The Story of Gilbert and Sullivan (1953) – Usher in 'Trial by Jury'
- Grand National Night (1953) – Hotel Manager
- Glad Tidings (1953) – Mr. George Boddington
- Will Any Gentleman...? (1953) – Mr. Coding
- The Intruder (1953) – Bertram Slake
- Monsieur Ripois (1954) – Priest (uncredited)
- The Belles of St. Trinian's (1954) – Wilfred Woodley
- Out of the Clouds (1955) – Booking Clerk at Heathrow (uncredited)
- The Glass Cage (1955) – Rutland
- The Constant Husband (1955) – Clerk of the court
- The Dam Busters (1955) – RAF Pay Clerk in NAAFI (uncredited)
- Footsteps in the Fog (1955) – Vicar
- One Way Out (1955) – Marriott
- Touch and Go (1955) – Man at the Window
- The Adventures of Quentin Durward (1955) – Injured Priest (uncredited)
- One Wish Too Many (1956) – Headmaster
- I Accuse! (1958) – Capt. Lauth
- Law and Disorder (1958) – Burrows
- I Only Arsked! (1958) – Sir Redvers
- Nowhere to Go (1958) – First Mr. Dodds (uncredited)
- Rockets Galore! (1958) – Meeching
- Libel (1959) – Car Salesman
- Friends and Neighbours (1959) – Rev. Dobson
- Desert Mice (1959) – Navy Doctor (uncredited)
- Bottoms Up (1960) – Oliver Pettigrew
- Watch It, Sailor! (1961) – Vicar (guest appearance)
- Paradisio (1961) – Professor Sims
- Kill or Cure (1962) – Green Glades Desk Clerk
- The V.I.P.s (1963) – Bar Steward (uncredited)
- Ladies Who Do (1963) – Chauffeur
- Les Félins (1964) – Father Nielson
- The Counterfeit Constable (1964) – Le supporter anglais qui boit du champagne (uncredited)
- You Must Be Joking! (1965) – Cecil
- Lady L (1965) – Butler
- The Ghost Goes Gear (1966) – Vicar
- Grand Prix (1966) – Claude (uncredited)
- The Shoes of the Fisherman (1968) – English Cardinal
- The Best House in London (1969) – Mr. Fortnum
- Hoverbug (1969) – Mr. Watts
- My Lover, My Son (1970) – Judge
- Jane Eyre (1970) – Doctor
- Zeppelin (1971) – Carlyle (uncredited)
- The Magnificent Seven Deadly Sins (1971) – Kenneth (segment "Wrath")
- Blinker's Spy-Spotter (1972) – Professor
- Steptoe and Son (1972) – Vicar
- One of Our Dinosaurs Is Missing (1975) – Thumley
- Las adolescentes (1975) – Headmaster
- The Bawdy Adventures of Tom Jones (1976) – Old Vicar
- Hardcore (1977) – Vicar
- Full Circle (1977) – Mr. Piggott
- The Prisoner of Zenda (1979) – Deacon
- Moonraker (1979) – Cavendish
- The Missionary (1982) – Fermleigh's Butler
- Trail of the Pink Panther (1982) – Arthur, Bruno's butler
- Curse of the Pink Panther (1983) – Arthur
- Another Country (1984) – Waiter
- Ever Decreasing Circles (1987) – Mr. Lazenby
- American Friends (1991) – Voe

== Television ==
- Inspector Morley: Late of Scotland Yard (1952) - (Shop Assistant) - ('The Red Flame': episode Two) - (with Dorothy Bramhall; Tucker McGuire; and Johnny Briggs (actor), in Episode 1).
- Strange Experiences (1955) – Man Episode: "Two-Faced Murder"
