= Tom Nardini =

American film actor

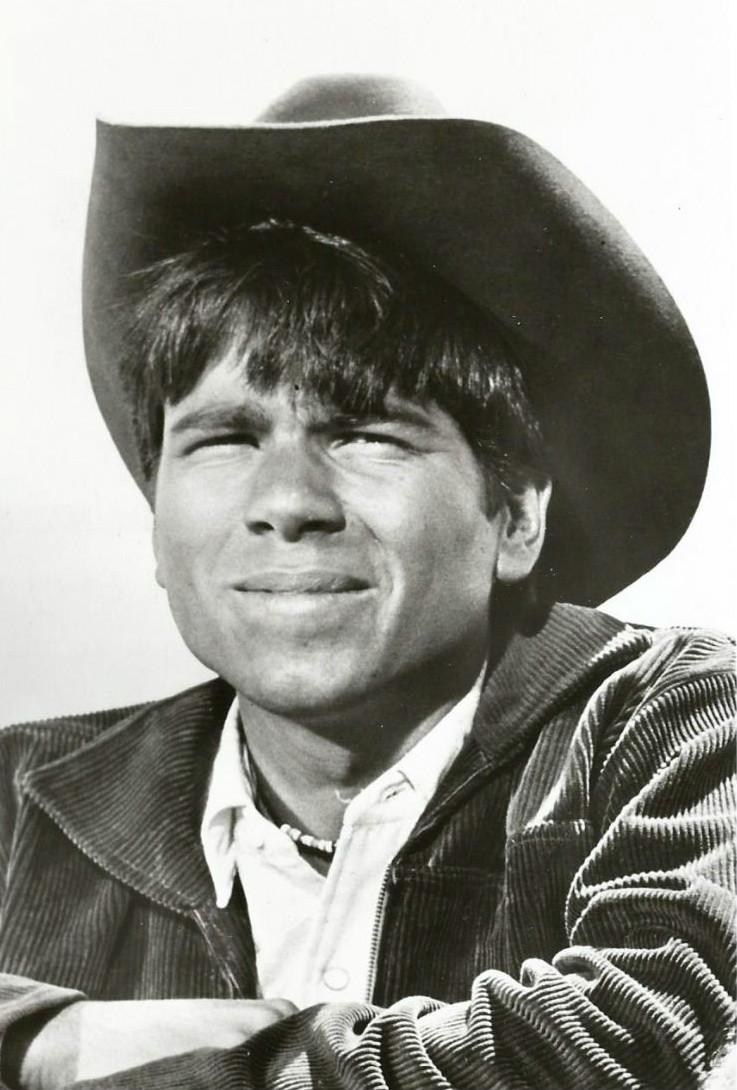
- Nardini in 1967 from Cowboy in Africa
- Born: Los Angeles, California, U.S.
- Education: El Camino Junior College
- Occupation: Actor
- Years active: 1964–2013
- Spouses: Judy K. Cooper (m. 1966; div. 1966) Melody Gay Barsocchini (m. 1970; div. 1981) Ruth Helen Belding (m. 1985)

Tom Nardini is an American film actor who had a lengthy career in television. His best-known roles were in Cowboy in Africa (1967), and in Cat Ballou (1965), for which he was nominated for a Golden Globe award.

== Early life ==
Born in Los Angeles, California, he was the son of Joseph and Chechi Nardini. Nardini's father worked as an aircraft worker after having a career as a trumpeter and his mother worked in vaudeville as a comedian, dancer, and singer. He attended Morningside High School in Inglewood, graduating in 1963. Nardini went on to El Camino Junior College in Torrance, where he studied theater and joined a Shakespearean group.

== Career ==
Nardini met an agent named Lester Miller, who was able to get him an interview to audition for Mr. Novak. This led to one of Nardini's first roles, appearing in three episodes of Novak as Abel King from 1964 to 1965. This allowed Nardini to land other roles as guest leads on other television shows such as The Lieutenant, My Three Sons and Bewitched. Nardini was then cast in the television series Cowboy in Africa, where he played the character John Henry.

Nardini signed a seven-year contract with Columbia Studios, which produced his film debut Cat Ballou in 1965. Nardini was cast as Jackson Two Bears, a Native American ranch hand for Cat Ballou's father. Nardini was nominated for Most Promising Newcomer - Male at the 23rd Golden Globe Awards for his performance.

In the films Cat Ballou and Africa: Texas Style, Nardini played a Native American character.

In 1966, Nardini co-starred in a pilot about a World War II-era historical novel written by James Jones called From Here to Eternity.

== Personal life ==
Nardini has been married three times, first to Judy K. Cooper during 1966, then Melody Gay Barsocchini from 1970 to 1981 with whom he had one son, and has been married to Ruth Helen Belding, with whom he has two sons, since 1985.

Nardini was in the Air Force reserve in 1966, based in Riverside, California.

== Filmography ==
- Chief Zabu (2016) .... Gatekeeper
- Kate & Allie (1985) .... (as Tom Nardino)
- Siege (1983) .... Horatio
- T. J. Hooker (1982) .... Falco
- Muggable Mary, Street Cop (1982) (TV) .... Mugger Inside Supermarket
- The Edge of Night (1981) .... Wally Branscom
- Win, Place or Steal (1975) .... Desk Sergeant
- Kung Fu .... Matoska (1 episode, 1974)
- Insight .... Rodriguez / ... (2 episodes, 1974)
- Love, American Style .... (segment "Love and the Test of Manhood") (1 episode, 1972)
- The Smith Family (1 episode, 1971)
- Cade's County .... Tom Running Man (1 episode, 1971)
- Bearcats! .... Father Liberto (1 episode, 1971)
- Cat Ballou (1970) (TV) .... Jackson Two Bears
- Harpy (1971) (TV) .... John
- Incident in San Francisco (1971) (TV) .... Alfred Cianelli
- The Mod Squad (1 episode, 1970)
- Land of the Giants .... Carl (1 episode, 1969)
- Hawaii Five-O .... Ramon (1 episode, 1969)
- Room 222 .... Robert Salazar (1 Season episode 15 El Genio) 1969
- The Devil's 8 (1969) .... Billy Joe
- The Young Animals (1968) .... Tony
- Cowboy in Africa .... John Henry (26 episodes, 1967–1968)
- Cimarron Strip .... John Wolf (1 episode, 1967)
- Africa Texas Style (1967) .... John Henry
- The Fugitive .... Jimmy Anza (1 episode, 1967)
- Gunsmoke .... Richard Danby (1 episode, 1965)
- Dr. Kildare .... Steve Perrona (7 episodes, 1965)
- Bewitched .... Indian (1 episode, 1965)
- Winter A-Go-Go (1965) .... Frankie
- Cat Ballou (1965) .... Jackson Two-Bears
- Death Valley Days .... Steve Avote (1 episode, 1965)
- Mr. Novak .... Abel King / ... (3 episodes, 1964–1965)
