= Africa Texas Style =

1967 film by Andrew Marton

Africa: Texas Style
- Theatrical release poster by Frank McCarthy
- Directed by: Andrew Marton
- Written by: Andy White
- Produced by: Andrew Marton; John Pellatt
- Starring: Hugh O'Brian; John Mills; Nigel Green; Tom Nardini
- Cinematography: Paul Beeson
- Edited by: Henry Richardson
- Music by: Malcolm Arnold
- Production company: Ivan Tors Films
- Distributed by: Paramount Pictures
- Release date: May 1967
- Running time: 109 minutes
- Country: United Kingdom
- Language: English

Africa Texas Style (also known as Cowboy in Africa) is a 1967 British adventure film directed by Andrew Marton and starring John Mills, Hugh O'Brian and Nigel Green.

== Plot ==
Two American cowboys are hired by a British rancher to oversee his estate in Kenya.

== Cast ==
- Hugh O'Brian as Jim Sinclair
- John Mills as Wing Commander Hayes
- Nigel Green as Karl Bekker
- Tom Nardini as John Henry
- Adrienne Corri as Fay Carter
- Ronald Howard as Hugo Copp
- Charles Malinda as Sampson
- Honey Wamala as Mr. Oyondi
- Charles Hayes as veterinarian
- Stephen Kikumu as Peter
- Ali Twaha as Turk
- Mohammed Abdullah as witch doctor

== Production ==
Shot on location in Africa and Florida, the film led to the 1967 ABC TV show Cowboy in Africa starring Chuck Connors. The opening scene of the film includes a cameo appearance by Mills' daughter Hayley Mills.

== Reception ==
The Monthly Film Bulletin wrote: "A poor script seriously weakens the good basic idea of a Western theme in an African setting, but despite this the film remains an engagingly straightforward adventure story, in which the villain is an unqualified cad and the hero wins through against tremendous odds. Andrew Marton takes full advantage of the Kenyan settings, and there is some fine action photography of the animals being roped, reaching a climax in the capture of a charging rhinoceros. Hugh O'Brian does well enough as the dashing hero, and Adrienne Corri enlivens an irrelevant romance."

Kine Weekly wrote: "The picture, which was made with full official help in East Africa, makes a dedication to the preservation of wild animals and, for that reason alone, is certain to have a wide appeal in this country. This very worthy morality, however, has tinged the plot with an earnest sentimentality that is likely to rouse the cynical."

Variety wrote: "Film is a slick and excep tionally well-turned-out piece of adventure picture-making, its title the only weight of heaviness about it. For action houses particularly and the general market where exotic backgrounds, wild animals and fast excitment are popular, feature stands a good chance for big play."
