= Cowboy in Africa =

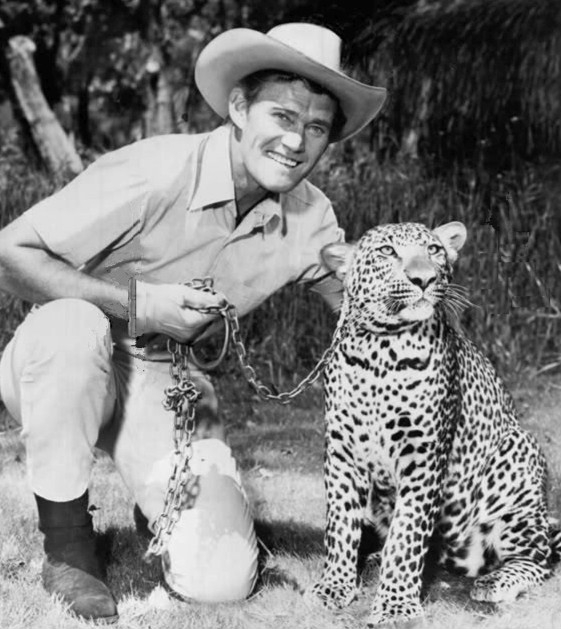
- Chuck Connors as Jim Sinclair, 1967
- Created by: Ivan Tors; Andy White
- Starring: Chuck Connors; Ronald Howard; Gerald Edwards; Tom Nardini
- Country of origin: United States
- No. of seasons: 1
- No. of episodes: 26

Production
- Executive producer: Aaron Spelling
- Running time: 60 min.

Original release
- Network: ABC
- Release: September 11, 1967 – April 1, 1968

Cowboy in Africa is an ABC television series produced in 1967–1968 by Ivan Tors and starring Chuck Connors. It was derived from a 1966 television pilot which was turned into a movie and released to cinemas as Africa Texas Style. The movie starred Hugh O'Brian as Jim Sinclair.

== Plot ==
Jim Sinclair is hired by Commander Hayes to introduce modern methods to his game ranch in Kenya. He brings his helper and best friend, a Navajo Indian named John Henry. Together, they work at roping wildlife and building herds on the ranch. During the first episode, a ten-year-old African boy named Samson watches from afar and decides Jim would make a perfect father. Samson runs for a day and a half to the Hayes/Sinclair ranch and declares to Jim, the world's champion cowboy, that Jim would be his father. By the end of the first episode the boy and cowboy have adopted each other. Samson, John Henry, and Jim Sinclair become a family.

The series competed during its single season for the same time period as the programs Gunsmoke and The Monkees.

== Cast ==
- Chuck Connors as Jim Sinclair
- Ronald Howard as Commander Hayes
- Tom Nardini as John Henry
- Gerald Edwards as Samson

== Episodes ==
No.	Title	Directed by	Written by	Original release date
1	"The New World"	Andrew Marton	Unknown	September 11, 1967
2	"Kifaru! Kifaru!"	Andrew Marton	Norman Katkov	September 18, 1967
3	"Incident at Derati Wells"	Allen Reisner	Robert Sabaroff	September 25, 1967
4	"What's an Elephant Mother to Do?"	Allen Reisner	Story by : Roswell Rogers; Teleplay by : Ed Adamson & Roswell Rogers	October 2, 1967
5	"Search for Survival"	Gene Nelson	Ed Adamson	October 9, 1967
6	"Stone Age Safari"	Andrew Marton	Palmer Thompson	October 16, 1967
7	"The Adopted One"	Unknown	Andy Lewis	October 23, 1967
8	"Fang and Claw"	Andrew McCullough	Penrod Smith	October 30, 1967
9	"The Time of the Predator"	Andrew Marton	Roger H. Lewis	November 6, 1967
10	"Lake Sinclair"	Jack Arnold	Story by : Norman Katkov; Teleplay by : Ed Adamson & Norman Katkov	November 13, 1967
11	"Tomorrow on the Wind"	Andrew McCullough	Story by : Samuel Roeca; Teleplay by : Ed Adamson & Samuel Roeca	November 20, 1967
12	"Little Boy Lost"	Jeffrey Hayden	Jay Simms	November 27, 1967
13	"The Man Who Has Everything"	Lawrence Dobkin	Ed Adamson & Palmer Thompson	December 4, 1967
14	"To Build a Beginning"	Unknown	Gordon T. Dawson	December 11, 1967
15	"The Hesitant Hero"	Unknown	Don Brinkley	December 18, 1967
16	"African Rodeo: Part 1"	Alex March	Gordon T. Dawson	January 15, 1968
17	"African Rodeo: Part 2"	Alex March	Gordon T. Dawson	January 22, 1968
18	"First to Capture"	Paul Henreid	Gordon T. Dawson	January 29, 1968
19	"The Red Hand of Michael O'Neill"	Unknown	Unknown	February 5, 1968
20	"The Quiet Death"	Earl Bellamy	Ed Adamson	February 19, 1968
21	"A Man of Value"	Earl Bellamy	John O'Dea & Jay Simms	February 26, 1968
22	"Search and Destroy"	Unknown	Unknown	March 4, 1968
23	"Work of Art"	Lawrence Dobkin	Frank L. Moss	March 11, 1968
24	"John Henry's Eden"	Earl Bellamy	Ed Adamson	March 18, 1968
25	"The Lions"	Lawrence Dobkin	Alan Caillou	March 25, 1968
26	"The Kasubi Death"	Unknown	Gordon T. Dawson	April 1, 1968
