= Irene Howard =

Costume designer (1903–1981)

Irene Mary Steiner Howard (17 June 1903 – December 1981) was a British casting director. Her brothers Leslie Howard and Arthur Howard, and nephew, Alan Howard, became successful actors. She died, aged 78, in Camden Town, North London, England.

== Filmography ==
- Pimpernel Smith (1941)
- In Which We Serve (1942)
- The Gentle Sex (1943)
- The Lamp Still Burns (1943)
- The Way Ahead (1944)
- Henry V (1944)
- Blithe Spirit (1945)
- The Way to the Stars (1945)
- School for Secrets (1946)
- The October Man (1947)
- Hungry Hill (1947)
- Odd Man Out (1947)
- Uncle Silas (1947)
- Edward, My Son (1949)
- The Miniver Story (1950)
- Quo Vadis (1951)
- Ivanhoe (1952)
- Knights of the Round Table (1953)
- Beau Brummell (1954)
- The Adventures of Quentin Durward (1955)
- Bhowani Junction (1956)
- Invitation to the Dance (1956)
- The Barretts of Wimpole Street (1957)
- The Little Hut (1957)
- Barnacle Bill (1957)
- Dunkirk (1958)
- A Touch of Larceny (1959)
- The Scapegoat (1959)
- Libel (1959)
- The Wreck of the Mary Deare (1959)
- Ben-Hur (1959)
- The Day They Robbed the Bank of England (1960)
- Macbeth (1960) (TV)
- Village of the Damned (1960)
- A Matter of WHO (1961)
- The Secret Partner (1961)
- The Green Helmet (1961)
- Invasion Quartet (1961)
- Village of Daughters (1962)
- Postman's Knock (1962)
- Light in the Piazza (1962)
- Four Horsemen of the Apocalypse(1962)
- I Thank a Fool (1962)
- Mutiny on the Bounty (1962)
- Kill or Cure (1962)
- The Password Is Courage (1962)
- Children of the Damned (1963)
- Follow the Boys (1963)
- Come Fly with Me (1963)
- The Haunting (1963)
- In the Cool of the Day (1963)
- Murder at the Gallop (1963)
- Cairo (1963)
- The V.I.P.s (1963)
- Ladies Who Do (1963)
- Night Must Fall (1964)
- Flipper's New Adventure (1964)
- Murder Ahoy! (1964)
- The Americanization of Emily (1964)
- The Yellow Rolls-Royce (1964)
- The Secret of My Success (1965)
- The Liquidator (1965)
- Lady L (1965)
- Doctor Zhivago (1965)
- The Alphabet Murders (1965)
- Cast a Giant Shadow (1966)
- Hotel Paradiso (1966)
- Blowup (1966)
- Grand Prix (1966)
- La Vingt-cinquième Heure (The 25th Hour) (1967)
- Eye of the Devil (1967)
- Three Bites of the Apple (1967)
- Africa - Texas Style! (1967)
- The Mercenaries (Dark of the Sun) (1968)
- Hot Millions (1968)
- The Shoes of the Fisherman (1968)
- The Fixer (1968)
- Mosquito Squadron (1969)
- Goodbye, Mr Chips (1969)
- Captain Nemo and the Underwater City (1969)
- Hell Boats (1970)
- One More Time (1970)
- The Walking Stick (1970)
- The Going Up of David Lev (1971) (TV)
- The Great Waltz (1972)
- Shaft in Africa (1973)
