= John Briley =

American screenwriter (1925–2019)

Richard John Briley
- Born: Richard John Briley; June 25, 1925; Kalamazoo, Michigan, U.S.
- Died: December 14, 2019 (aged 94); Sarasota, Florida, U.S.
- Education: University of Michigan (BA), (MA); University of Birmingham (PhD)
- Occupation: Screenwriter

Richard John Briley (June 25, 1925 – December 14, 2019) was an American writer best known for screenplays of biographical films. He won the Best Original Screenplay Oscar at the 55th Academy Awards for Gandhi (1982). As well as film scripts, he wrote for television and theatre, and published several novels.

== Biography ==
Briley was born in Kalamazoo, Michigan, and served in the United States Army Air Forces, 1943–46, reaching the rank of captain. At the University of Michigan, he gained a BA in 1950 and an MA in English 1951. He married Dorothy Louise Reichart in 1950, and they had four children. He worked in public relations for General Motors before rejoining the air force in 1955. He was posted to RAF Northolt airbase at South Ruislip near London, where he was director of orientation activities and started writing.

In 1960, he earned a PhD in Elizabethan drama from the University of Birmingham, left the air force and became a staff writer with MGM-British in Borehamwood. While with the studio, he wrote the script for Children of the Damned (1964), effectively a sequel of Village of the Damned (1960), but objected to the changes made for the finished film. He left MGM in 1964. He also had an uncredited part in the comedy Situation Hopeless... But Not Serious (1965).

=== Gandhi ===
Briley's script for Pope Joan (1972) attracted the interest of Richard Attenborough, although Attenborough was ultimately not involved in that project, and the film was critically panned. Several scripts for Attenborough's Gandhi project had been rejected, and Robert Bolt was scheduled to rewrite his own earlier draft when he suffered a stroke. Attenborough then turned to Briley. Briley shifted the focus of the narrative away from the point of view of the British in India to that of the Indian independence movement. He originally opposed Ben Kingsley in the title role, favouring John Hurt, but was later glad that Attenborough had cast Kingsley. Briley envisaged more emphasis on the relationship between Gandhi and Jawaharlal Nehru, but Kingsley's towering performance came to dominate the finished film. Briley claims he and Attenborough were personally satisfied with the movie and unconcerned about any critical and commercial success. In the event, Briley's original screenplay won the Oscar and the Golden Globe. Attenborough later said of Briley, "He's a difficult bugger, a bit of a prima-donna, but the bastard's brilliant".

=== Later life ===
In 1985, Briley began developing a musical about Martin Luther King Jr., writing the book and lyrics and acting as co-producer, originally for American Playhouse. He left the project in February 1989 after contract negotiations broke down. A different version opened in London in 1990. Briley attempted to obtain an injunction, claiming he had paid the King family $200,000 in personality rights.

In 1987, Briley again teamed up with Attenborough for Cry Freedom, about the South African anti-apartheid activist Steve Biko. Briley had disagreements with Donald Woods, the journalist whose books formed the basis of the script. Briley viewed the nonviolence of the Black Consciousness Movement as principled, whereas Woods felt it was a tactical decision. Although Woods feared Briley lacked an awareness of the complexities of political debate among black South Africans, those shown a preview of the film felt it was realistic.

In 1993, Briley switched agents from International Creative Management to the William Morris Agency. In 1998, he was a founding partner of "the Film Makers Company", a venture intended to encourage film production in Bridgeport, Connecticut, and was planning to relocate to there. He was given a Lifetime Achievement Award at the Big Bear Lake International Film Festival in 2000. He died on December 14, 2019, aged 94.

=== Unproduced scripts ===
Unproduced scripts on which Briley worked include: adaptations of Henderson the Rain King, Mister God, This Is Anna, White Fang, Man's Fate, and his own novel How Sleep the Brave; biopics of Franz Kafka, Genghis Khan – to have been directed by Shin Sang-ok, Robert Hunter (Warriors of the Rainbow) – to have been directed by Renny Harlin, Tina Modotti (A Fragile Life), Beryl Markham (West with the Night), and Pope John Paul II; The Cross and the Crescent, about Francis of Assisi and the Crusades; and a miniseries about the Italian Renaissance. Briley's adaptation of Arthur Miller's play The Crucible was dropped when Miller's son Robert secured production rights; Arthur Miller himself wrote the screenplay for the 1996 film.

== Works ==
=== Film ===
Title	Year	Notes
The Populist	1999	about Ernst Hanfstaengl; based on his memoirs Hitler: the missing years
Molokai: The Story of Father Damien	1999	about Father Damien and the Kalaupapa Leper Colony; also associate producer. Nominated for the AFI Award.
Christopher Columbus: The Discovery	1992	about Christopher Columbus; written with Cary Bates and Mario Puzo. Nominated for the Golden Raspberry.
The Warriors of the Rainbow	1992	about Greenpeace; based on Warriors of the Rainbow: A Chronicle of the Greenpeace Movement by Robert Hunter.
Sandino	1990	about Augusto César Sandino, inspiration for the Sandinistas
Cry Freedom	1987	about Steve Biko, from the books Asking for Trouble and Biko by Donald Woods. Briley was also co-producer
Tai-Pan	1986	with Stanley Mann; based on the novel Tai-Pan by James Clavell
Marie	1985	about Marie Ragghianti; based on the book by Peter Maas
Enigma	1982	based on the novel by Michael Barak
Gandhi	1982	about Mohandas K. Gandhi; won the Oscar and Golden Globe; nominated for the BAFTA.
Eagle's Wing	1979	Western; story by Michael Syson
The Medusa Touch	1978	based on the novel The Medusa Touch by Peter Van Greenaway
That Lucky Touch	1975	comedy; written with Monja Danischewsky and Moss Hart
Pope Joan	1972	about Pope Joan; also associate producer.
Hammerhead	1968	story by James Mayo; adaptation by Briley; screenplay by William Bast and Herbert Baker
Children of the Damned	1963	horror sequel to Village of the Damned
Postman's Knock	1962	comedy; written with Jack Trevor Story
Invasion Quartet	1961	based on the novel by Norman Collins; written with Jack Trevor Story

=== Other ===
Name	Year	Type	Notes
The History of Sex	1999	television	History Channel documentary
The First Stone	1997	novel	A Jewish American woman is recruited by Mossad to marry a rich Saudi Arabian.
Mary Sidney – a 20th Century Reappraisal	1985	book chapter	In a festschrift for Willem Schrickx
The Last Dance	1978	novel	A rogue scientist tries to force global disarmament by threatening a nuclear holocaust.
So Who Needs Men!	1976	theatre	bedroom farce set in university lodgings; Briley also directed.
The Traitors	1969	novel	In the Vietnam War, six US soldiers are captured by the Viet Cong and indoctrinated by a renegade GI. Richard Rhodes reviewed the novel in the New York Times as, "Bitter reality... it all might have happened... the terrible thing is that it ever had to." The Chicago Sun-Times called it, "A magnificent blockbuster of a book. If you can find the time to read only one book this year, let The Traitors be that book." David Schoenbrun of CBS said, "It captures the tragedy and comedy, in the classic sense, of that absurd aberration of American history." Shirley K. Sullivan of KTIB Radio called it, "Unsettling, haunting... a proper shocker," and the Saturday Review of Literature urged, "Read it for his explosive accounts of jungle warfare and his moral passion." Described by Peter S. Prescott as "a sermon masquerading as a novel". UK edition (1971) titled How Sleep the Brave
The Airbase	1965	television	BBC sitcom; based on his own experiences
Seven Bob a Buck, subtitled How to Survive as a Tourist in the USA	1964	theatre	"a short-lived, intimate revue which satirised American values and attitudes"; Briley also acted in it. Televised on BBC2 as See America First on November 28, 1964.
Hits and Misses	1962	television	BBC teleplay
A biography of William Herbert, third earl of Pembroke, 1580–1630	1961	dissertation	PhD dissertation
Edward Alleyn and Henslowe's Will	1958	journal article	in Shakespeare Quarterly
Of Stake and Stage	1955	book chapter	in Shakespeare Survey
