= Postman's Knock (film) =

1962 British film by Robert Lynn

- British quad poster
- Directed by: Robert Lynn
- Written by: John Briley; Jack Trevor Story Additional dialogue by Spike Milligan and Ronald Kinnoch (as "George Barclay")
- Based on: a story by Jack Trevor Story
- Produced by: Ronald Kinnoch
- Starring: Spike Milligan; Barbara Shelley; John Wood
- Cinematography: Gerald Moss
- Edited by: Geoffrey Foot
- Music by: Ron Goodwin
- Production company: Metro-Goldwyn-Mayer British Studios
- Distributed by: Metro-Goldwyn-Mayer (UK)
- Release date: 22 February 1962 (UK)
- Running time: 88 min
- Country: United Kingdom
- Language: English

Postman's Knock is a 1962 British comedy film directed by Robert Lynn starring Spike Milligan, Barbara Shelley, John Wood and Warren Mitchell. The screenplay, by John Briley and Jack Trevor Story, concerns a country postman who is transferred to London, where he manages to foil a major robbery.

According to MGM the film made a loss of $31,000.

== Plot ==
Harold Petts is a conscientious village postman who receives a promotion that takes him to London to be trained at London's busiest post office. However, after his first day in the big city, he is soon in trouble.

In the main sorting office, he succeeds in beating the new mail sorting machine at pigeonholing letters for delivery (the machine blows up in the process). As a result, he is placed safely out of the way in the parcels department, but sorts parcels at such speed that he puts everyone else in the department out of work.

This leads him to a meeting with the staff psychiatrist, and then to Jean, an ambitious art student, and the pair find themselves the main suspects in a mail theft ring, with the police and post office officials hot on their heels.

== Cast ==
- Spike Milligan as Harold Petts
- Barbara Shelley as Jean
- John Wood as P.C. Woods
- Archie Duncan as Inspector
- Warren Mitchell as Rupert
- Lance Percival as Joe
- Arthur Mullard as Sam
- John Bennett as Pete
- Ronald Adam as Mr. Fordyce
- Miles Malleson as psychiatrist
- Wilfrid Lawson as postman
- Mario Fabrizi as villager
- Bob Todd as District Superintendent

== Soundtrack ==
The title song, written by Ron Goodwin and sung by Milligan with a children's chorus, was released as a single in 1962, b/w "Wormwood Scrubs Tango" (Harry Edgington, Milligan) (Parlophone 45-R 4891).

== Critical reception ==
The Monthly Film Bulletin wrote: "One or two promising satirical ideas have been buried under layers of haphazard, tedious slapstick. The film is written and directed with the minimum of invention, and Spike Milligan seems submerged beneath the general air of mediocrity. However, there are flashes of mild, Goonish fun and a few muttered imprecations from Wilfrid Lawson to brighten the encircling gloom."

David McGillivray described the film in the Radio Times as "one of two comedies (the other is Invasion Quartet [1961]) created for Spike Milligan by John Briley and Jack Trevor Story, talented writers not noted for their eccentric humour (Briley went on to script Gandhi [1982] and Cry Freedom [1987]). Consequently the brilliant Goon flounders in the conventional, happy-go-lucky tale of a village postman who is transferred to London."

Leslie Halliwell said: "Mildly amusing star vehicle rising to good comic climaxes."

Britmovie noted "several promising satirical opportunities are sadly lost beneath a welter of frenetic slapstick."
