= Invasion Quartet =

1961 British film by Jay Lewis

- Original film poster by Ronald Searle
- Directed by: Jay Lewis
- Written by: Jack Trevor Story; John Briley; Norman Collins (story)
- Produced by: Ronald Kinnoch
- Starring: Bill Travers; Spike Milligan
- Cinematography: Geoffrey Faithfull; Gerald Moss
- Edited by: Ernest Walter
- Music by: Ron Goodwin
- Distributed by: Metro Goldwyn Mayer
- Release date: September 1961
- Running time: 91 minutes
- Country: United Kingdom
- Language: English

Invasion Quartet is a 1961 British World War II comedy-drama film directed by Jay Lewis and starring Bill Travers and Spike Milligan. The screenplay was by Jack Trevor Story and John Briley based on a story by Norman Collins.

== Plot ==
Two wounded officers, one British and one French, are deemed unfit and surplus to requirements. They abscond from their hospital and, together with an explosives expert suffering from mental illness, and a Colonel, thought too old to serve in the Army, make their way to France to destroy a long range German artillery piece.

== Cast ==
- Bill Travers as Freddie Oppenheimer
- Spike Milligan as Godfrey Pringle
- Grégoire Aslan as Debrie
- John Le Mesurier as Colonel
- Thorley Walters as Cummings
- Maurice Denham as Dr. Barker
- Thelma Ruby as matron
- Millicent Martin as Kay
- Cyril Luckham as Col. Harbottle
- William Mervyn as naval officer
- Peter Swanwick as gun commander
- Alexander Archdale as Brigadier, War Office
- Gerald Case as Medical Board officer (uncredited)
- Ernst Ulman as German Sergeant
- John Wood as duty officer, War Office
- Richard Marner as German soldier (uncredited)
- Bernard Hunter as coding officer, War Office

== Production ==
The film was part of the first slate of productions by MGM British under Lawrence P. Bachmann.

== Release ==
It was publicised as a parody of The Guns of Navarone.

== Reception ==
=== Box office ===
According to MGM records, the film made a loss of $119,000. However in May 1962 MGM's head of British production Lawrence Bachmann claimed the film was in profit.

=== Critical ===
The Monthly Film Bulletin wrote: "Here is a story with almost unlimited possibilities for satire including, as it does, references to all the standard British war film themes, from Kwai to Navarone. Regrettably, its makers have taken the easy way out. Instead of pursuing all the debunking opportunities to their logical conclusion, they have fallen back on well-tried slapstick situations and hoary verbal gags. Even on this level, the production is often forced and heavy and, from a generally ill-directed cast, only Spike Milligan's brand of zany humour emerges reasonably intact."

Kine Weekly wrote: "The picture makes neat cracks at British Intelligence, the Jerries, the Maquis, MO's and the Home Guard, but could have done with some Carry On ribaldry and 'skirt.' Bill Travers, John Le Mesurier and Gregoire Aslan are quite amusing as Oppenheimer, the colonel and Debrie, but the most versatile performance comes from Spike Milligan as the reluctant Pringle. Millicent Martin and Thelma Ruby are merely passengers in the only feminine roles. In the first half the humour is spontaneous, but during the second the gags are more ambitious and the conscious striving for effect lessens impact."

The Radio Times Guide to Films gave the film 1/5 stars, writing: "MGM's British department showed just how far its reputation had plummeted since the glory days of the late 1930s with this woeful wartime farrago. One might have had higher hopes for a script by Jack Trevor Story and John Briley, but what they serve up here is a preposterous tale about a ragtag outfit sent into Nazi-occupied France to knock out a gun aimed at Dover."
