= The Airbase =

- Genre: Sitcom
- Starring: David Kelsey; David Healy; Eddie Matthews; Alan Gifford
- Country of origin: United Kingdom
- No. of episodes: 6

Production
- Running time: 25 minutes

Original release
- Network: BBC2
- Release: 24 March – 28 April 1965

The Airbase is a black-and-white British sitcom that was broadcast on BBC2 in 1965. It was written by John Briley.

== Cast ==
- David Kelsey – Sqn Ldr Terence Elgin Heatherton
- David Healy – Staff Sgt. George Tillman Miller
- Eddie Matthews – Airman Randy Ricks
- Alan Gifford – Colonel Hoggart

== Plot ==
The American writer John Briley wrote this sitcom from his own experiences as a soldier stationed in England. The lead character is Sqn Ldr Heatherton who is the commanding officer at RAF Wittlethorpe. Much of his time is taken up by him being the middle man between the local community and his US airmen.

== Episodes ==
1. Episode One (24 March 1965)
2. Episode Two (31 March 1965)
3. Episode Three (7 April 1965)
4. Episode Four (14 April 1965)
5. Episode Five (21 April 1965)
6. Episode Six (28 April 1965)

No episodes are known to exist in the BBC's archives as of 2026; the show was presumably wiped in the early 1970s.
