= John Wood (English actor) =

English actor (1930–2011)

John Wood CBE
- As Dr. Stephen Falken in WarGames (1983)
- Born: 5 July 1930; Harpenden, England, U.K.
- Died: 6 August 2011 (aged 81); London, England
- Education: Bedford School
- Alma mater: University of Oxford
- Occupation: Actor
- Years active: 1952–2008
- Spouses: Gillian Neason (m. 1957; div. 19??); Sylvia Vaughan (m. 1977)
- Children: 4

John Lamin Wood (5 July 1930 – 6 August 2011) was an English actor known for his Shakespearean performances and his lasting association with Tom Stoppard. In 1976, he received a Tony Award for Best Actor in a Play for his performance in Stoppard's Travesties. He was nominated for further Tony Awards for his roles in Sherlock Holmes (1975) and Rosencrantz and Guildenstern Are Dead (1968). His films included WarGames (1983), The Purple Rose of Cairo (1985), Ladyhawke (1985), Jumpin' Jack Flash (1986), Orlando (1992), Shadowlands (1993), The Madness of King George (1994), Richard III (1995), Sabrina (1995), and Chocolat (2000).

In 2007, Wood was appointed a Commander of the Order of the British Empire in the Queen's New Year Honours List.

== Early life ==
John Lamin Wood was born to Reginald and Norah (née Lamin) Wood on 5 July 1930 in Harpenden, Hertfordshire; he spent his early years there and in Derby. He was educated at Bedford School. He did his national service as a lieutenant with the Royal Artillery. During his time of service, he was invalided out after being accidentally shot in the back. Later during his service, he was almost killed during a Jeep accident.

Wood studied law at Jesus College, Oxford, where he was president of the Oxford University Dramatic Society. He had seen John Gielgud as Angelo in Peter Brook's (1950) and Stratford-Upon-Avon production of Measure for Measure. After seeing the productions, Wood stated "suddenly knew what I wanted to do". During the Mansfield College Gardens production of Twelfth Night he played the role of Malvolio alongside Maggie Smith starring as Viola. Oxford Mail described his performance as "looking as lean, lanky and statuesque as Don Quixote."

Wood directed and starred in a student production of Richard III where he invited one of the leading critics of the time, Harold Hobson, to the performance. He told Hobson that he would be "wanting in his duties" to ignore a Richard III that was "finer than Olivier's". Out of curiosity, Hobson went to the performance and reported that he had seen "something not to be missed". Hobson said of Wood's performance: "He had a sardonic, amused condescension and visible superiority complex", and the critic foresaw "a considerable future". Wood graduated from Oxford in 1953.

== Career ==
In 1954, Wood joined the Old Vic company performing a number of small roles over the span of two years as the company staged the complete First Folio of Shakespeare plays. Wood dismissively described these roles as "the cheapest way of getting a Shakespearean costume on stage", although Kenneth Tynan thought his Lennox to Paul Rogers' Macbeth "cut like a razor through the stubble of fustian". Other roles included Bushy and Exton in Richard II, Sir Oliver Martext in As You Like It, Pistol in The Merry Wives of Windsor, and Helenus in Troilus and Cressida.

Wood made his West End debut as Don Quixote in Peter Hall's staging of Tennessee Williams's Camino Real (Phoenix, 1957). He then joined George Devine's English Stage Company, which at the time was about to change the course of new British drama at the Royal Court. Wood read scripts, co-directed a Sunday production, and appeared in Nigel Dennis's The Making of Moo (1957). Wood returned to the West End in Peter Hall's production of The Brouhaha (Aldwych, 1958), in which he had only a small part; but as Peter Sellers's understudy he played a leading role 15 times.

Despairing of a successful career, he rejected several offers from Hall in the early 1960s to join the newly formed Royal Shakespeare Company, where he chose to appear on television in A Tale of Two Cities and Barnaby Rudge, along with other production. He returned to the West End in 1961 as Henry Albertson in the whimsical off-Broadway musical, The Fantasticks, at the Apollo. Most of the next six years were spent in a variety of films and TV programmes. His last TV performances were in short plays written by Tom Stoppard for Thirty Minute Theatre: "Teeth" (February 1967) and "Another Moon Called Earth" (28 June 1967). He also appeared in "The Bird Who Knew Too Much" (February 1967), an episode of The Avengers (Wood also appeared in the ill-fated film version of the series thirty years later).

Wood's association with Stoppard brought him back to the stage. In his New York debut Wood played Guildenstern in the Broadway premiere of Stoppard's Rosencrantz and Guildenstern Are Dead. Wood's performance as Guildenstern earned a Tony nomination. While in America, he starred in two Jerry Lewis films, One More Time and Which Way to the Front?. Wood recalled of Lewis: "He taught me never to be afraid to take a risk. There was only one response, laughter, to the most horrific, cruel thing you can imagine."

He returned to England to play Frederick the Great in Romulus Linney's The Sorrows of Frederick at the Birmingham Rep in 1970. The same year he had his first real London success in Harold Pinter's revival of James Joyce's Exiles. His performance as Richard Rowan, a self-tortured author with a need to be deceived by his wife, won the Bancroft Gold Medal award in 1970 for Most Promising Actor.

Wood joined the Royal Shakespeare Company at the Aldwych Theatre in 1971 under Peter Hall, where he remained for several seasons. In 1971, he played Yakov Bardin in Maxim Gorky's Enemies. His 1972 performance as Brutus in Julius Caesar was his breakthrough performance. At the RSC he also played Sir Fopling Flutter in George Etherege's Restoration comedy The Man of Mode, Mark in Jean Genet's The Balcony, and a narcissistic Saturninus in Titus Andronicus. After the two Roman plays, Wood was acclaimed as "the most intellectually exciting actor in Britain" by Sheridan Morley.

He appeared in John Mortimer's Collaborators (Garrick, 1973) alongside Glenda Jackson. Returning to the RSC he took the title role in William Gillette's 1899 drama Sherlock Holmes. The RSC took the production to Broadway in late 1974, attracting his second Tony nomination in 1975. It was the start of a seven year period alternating between London and New York City.

Before transferring to America, Wood took on the role of the diplomat Henry Carr in the 1974 premiere of Tom Stoppard's Travesties. Stoppard wrote the part of Carr specifically for Wood, meaning Trevor Nunn was able to secure Travesties for the RSC. As Carr, Wood alternated between the dual roles of a querulous geriatric and his younger snobbish self remembering his encounters with James Joyce, Tristan Tzara, and Lenin in 1917 Zurich. Wood was awarded the Evening Standard Best Actor award. Travesties transferred to Broadway at the Ethel Barrymore Theatre in 1975, and Wood won a Tony Award in 1976 and a Drama Desk Award for his performance.

At the RSC in 1976 with Tom Conti, Bob Hoskins, T. P. McKenna, and Zoë Wanamaker, he took the lead as General Bugoyne, in George Bernard Shaw's The Devil's Disciple. He also had the title role in "the ideal midlife crisis play", as Chekhov's Ivanov. In 1977, he took the role of the lunatic Ivanov, who imagines he owns an orchestra, in Tom Stoppard and André Previn's political oratorio Every Good Boy Deserves Favour, directed by Trevor Nunn at the Royal Festival Hall. In autumn 1977 he played the title role in a Broadway production of Tartuffe (translated by Richard Wilbur) at Circle in the Square Theatre. In 1978, Wood was in the Broadway success, Deathtrap in which he originated the role of Sidney Bruhl, a murderous playwright. Explaining his decision to take the part (a more commercial and contemporary venture than he was normally associated with), Wood told Newsweek, "I just wanted to get onstage in ordinary pants and do one-liners." His performance won the 1978 Outer Critics Circle Outstanding Actor in a Play award. Wood returned to London as Richard III in a 1979 National Theatre production of the Shakespeare play, but his performance received mixed reviews. At the National Theatre at the same time he was also in Arthur Schnitzler's Undiscovered Country. Wood returned to Broadway in November 1981, taking over for Ian McKellen as Salieri in Peter Shaffer's Amadeus until spring 1982.

From 1983 and 1986, he acted in a variety of Hollywood films, including WarGames (1983), The Purple Rose of Cairo (1984), Ladyhawke (1985), and Jumpin' Jack Flash (1986). He then played the Player in the 1987 New York revival of Rosencrantz and Guildenstern Are Dead. Wood then returned to England and the RSC for three towering roles over the next three years. In 1988 he played an acclaimed a successful Prospero in Nicholas Hyner's production of The Tempest. The critic Irving Wardle said that Wood, "lit up the text like an electric storm, and simply had no rival as a source of nervous energy on a stage." Michael Billington wrote that Wood's Prospero "struck me as the best I had ever seen". His Solness in Adrian Noble's 1989 production of Ibsen's The Master Builder was as critically lauded. In the same 1989 RSC season he played Sheridan Whiteside in The Man Who Came to Dinner directed by Gene Saks.

His King Lear in Nicholas Hytner's 1990 production was called his "crowning achievement" with one of his most compelling performances, in which Michael Billington wrote, "No actor has also brought out King Lear's emotional anarchy: I've never forgotten how Wood, having issued the most terrifying threats to Goneril, suddenly rushed up to embrace her.". His performance won the Evening Standard award for Best Actor of 1991. In that RSC season, he also played Don Armado in Terry Hands production of Love's Labour's Lost.

Thereafter, Wood appeared in far fewer plays but returned to playing character roles in films and television. This included Shadowlands (1993), Nicholas Hytner's The Madness of King George (1994), Sabrina (1995), and Ian McKellen's fascist-themed Richard III (1995). He also played Baron de Charlus in the 1997 radio adaptation of Harold Pinter's screenplay of Marcel Proust's À la recherche du temps perdu.

In 1994, he played the East End gangster in Philip Ridley's Ghost from a Perfect Place at the Hampstead theatre. Wood returned to the National Theatre in 1997 for Richard Eyre's production of The Invention of Love by Tom Stoppard. Wood played the aging classical scholar and poet A.E. Housman in a role written specifically for him by Stoppard, and for which he received a nomination for an Olivier Award.

He played Spooner at the National Theatre in 2001 in Harold Pinter's, No Man's Land. He last appeared on stage in 2005 at the National Theatre in both parts of Henry IV. He was supposed to appear in the Robert Altman-directed Resurrection Blues by Arthur Miller at the Old Vic but had to withdraw because of illness. Wood made his last television appearance guesting on Lewis in 2007.

== Personal life and death ==
In 1957, Wood married Gillian Neason; they had a son and later divorced. In 1977, he married Sylvia Vaughan, and had three children. He lived in Hidcote Boyce, Gloucestershire.

Wood died from pneumonia and chronic obstructive pulmonary disease at Hillingdon Hospital in London on 6 August 2011, aged 81.

== Filmography ==
=== Film ===
| Year | Title | Role | Notes |
|---|---|---|---|
| 1953 | Salome | Sword Dancer | Uncredited |
| 1959 | Idol on Parade | Jeremy | |
| 1960 | Two-Way Stretch | Captain | |
| 1960 | Let's Get Married | Ice Cream Man | |
| 1960 | The Challenge | School Inspector | |
| 1961 | Gorgo | Sandwich board man | Uncredited |
| 1961 | The Rebel | Poet | |
| 1961 | Wings of Death | Photographer | Short |
| 1961 | Invasion Quartet | Duty Officer - War Office | |
| 1962 | Postman's Knock | P.C. Woods | John Woods |
| 1962 | Live Now – Pay Later | Curate | |
| 1963 | Just for Fun | Official | |
| 1963 | Love Is a Ball | Julian Soames | |
| 1963 | The Mouse on the Moon | Countryman | |
| 1963 | That Kind of Girl | Doctor | |
| 1965 | Lady L | Photographer | Uncredited |
| 1967 | Just like a Woman | John Martin | |
| 1970 | One More Time | Figg | |
| 1970 | The Engagement | Penciller | |
| 1970 | Which Way to the Front? | Finkel | |
| 1971 | Nicholas and Alexandra | Colonel Kobylinsky | |
| 1972 | Slaughterhouse-Five | English Officer | Tom Wood |
| 1978 | Somebody Killed Her Husband | Ernest Van Santen | |
| 1983 | Agent 000 and the Deadly Curves | Agent 009 | |
| 1983 | WarGames | Dr. Stephen Falken | |
| 1985 | The Purple Rose of Cairo | Jason | |
| 1985 | Ladyhawke | Bishop of Aquila | |
| 1986 | Lady Jane | John Dudley, Duke of Northumberland | |
| 1986 | Heartburn | British Moderator | |
| 1986 | Jumpin' Jack Flash | Jeremy Talbott | |
| 1992 | Orlando | Archduke Harry | |
| 1993 | The Young Americans | Richard Donnelly | |
| 1993 | Shadowlands | Christopher Riley | |
| 1994 | Uncovered | Cesar | |
| 1994 | The Madness of King George | Thurlow | |
| 1995 | Richard III | King Edward IV | |
| 1995 | Sabrina | Tom Fairchild | |
| 1996 | Jane Eyre | Mr. Brocklehurst | |
| 1997 | Metroland | The Retired Commuter | |
| 1997 | The Gambler | The General | |
| 1998 | Sweet Revenge | Col. Marcus | |
| 1998 | The Avengers | Trubshaw | |
| 1999 | An Ideal Husband | Lord Caversham | |
| 1999 | The Venice Project | The Viscount | |
| 1999 | Mad Cows | Alistair | |
| 2000 | The Little Vampire | Lord McAshton | |
| 2000 | Chocolat | Guillaume Blerot | |
| 2001 | The Body | Cardinal Pesci | |
| 2003 | Imagining Argentina | Amos Sternberg | |
| 2004 | The Rocket Post | Sir Wilson Ramsay | |
| 2005 | The White Countess | Prince Peter Belinsky | |

=== Television ===
| Year | Title | Role | Notes |
|---|---|---|---|
| 1955 | Strange Experiences | Man | 2 episodes |
| 1960 | Barnaby Rudge | Barnaby Rudge | 12 episodes |
| 1962 | Saki | Mr. Blenkinthrope | 1 episode |
| 1964 | Espionage | Douglas | Episode: "A Free Agent" |
| 1964 | And Benbow Was His Name | Captain Kirby | TV movie |
| 1965 | A Tale of Two Cities | Sydney Carton | 8 episodes |
| 1966 | Out of the Unknown | Brenner | Episode: "Too Many Cooks" |
| 1967 | The Avengers | Edgar Twitter | Episode: "The Bird Who Knew Too Much" |
| 1967 | Hondo | Goya | Episode: "Hondo and the Gladiators" |
| 1967 | Armchair Theatre | Brian | Episode: "Poor Cherry" |
| 1971 | Doomwatch | Nigel Waring | Episode: "No Room for Error" |
| 1991 | Thatcher: The Final Days | Michael Heseltine | TV movie |
| 1993 | The Young Indiana Jones Chronicles | Charles Webster Leadbeater | Episode: "Benares, January 1910 " |
| 1995 | Citizen X | Prosecutor Gorbunov | TV movie |
| 1997 | Kavanagh QC | Mr. Justice Way | Episode: "Mute of Malice" |
| 2000 | Longitude | Sir Edmond Halley | TV movie |
| 2000 | The Canterbury Tales | The Knight | Voice, 2 episodes |
| 2001 | Love in a Cold Climate | Lord Merlin | TV Mini-Series |
| 2001 | Victoria and Albert | The Duke of Wellington | TV movie |
| 2002 | Napoleon | Pope Pius VII | Episode: "1800-1807" |
| 2004 | The Return of the Dancing Master | Jonas Andersson | TV movie |
| 2004 | Foyle's War | Sir Michael Waterford | Episode: "Enemy Fire" |
| 2007 | Lewis | Edward Le Plassiter | Episode: "Expiation" |

== Awards and honours ==
| Year | Award | Category | Nominated work | Results | Ref. |
|---|---|---|---|---|---|
| 2006 | Clarence Derwent Awards | Best Male in a Supporting Role (UK) | Henry IV, Part 2 | Won | |
| 1976 | Drama Desk Awards | Outstanding Actor in a Play | Travesties | Won | |
| 1983 | Saturn Awards | Best Supporting Actor | WarGames | Nominated | |
| 2000 | Screen Actors Guild Awards | Outstanding Performance by a Cast in a Motion Picture | Chocolat | Nominated | |
| 1968 | Tony Awards | Best Supporting or Featured Actor in a Play | Rosencrantz and Guildenstern Are Dead | Nominated | |
| 1975 | Tony Awards | Best Leading Actor in a Play | Sherlock Holmes | Nominated | |
| 1976 | Tony Awards | Best Leading Actor in a Play | Travesties | Won | |

=== Commander of the Order of the British Empire ===
- Wood was appointed a Commander of the Order of the British Empire in the New Year Honours List of 2007.
