= Town on Trial =

1957 British film by John Guillermin

- UK quad format poster
- Directed by: John Guillermin
- Written by: Ken Hughes; Robert Westerby
- Produced by: Maxwell Setton
- Starring: John Mills; Charles Coburn; Barbara Bates; Derek Farr; Elizabeth Seal
- Cinematography: Basil Emmott
- Edited by: Max Benedict
- Music by: Tristram Cary
- Production company: Marksman Films
- Distributed by: Columbia Pictures
- Release dates: 22 January 1957 (UK); August 1957 (US)
- Running time: 96 mins
- Country: United Kingdom
- Language: English

Town on Trial is a 1957 British mystery film directed by John Guillermin and starring John Mills, Charles Coburn, Barbara Bates and Derek Farr. It was written by Ken Hughes and Robert Westerby. A whole town comes under suspicion when two grisly murders are carried out—particularly members of the local sports club.

== Plot ==
While playing tennis at a posh club in a town near London called Oakley Park, young and flirty Molly Stevens attracts considerable interest. The men ogle her and the women detest her. She is later found dead, strangled with a stocking. The local police chief requests the help of Scotland Yard, so Detective Superintendent Mike Halloran is sent to investigate. The locals, however, resent having an outsider poking into their affairs.

A book of love poems, including an inscription from a Peter Crowley, is found in the victim's flat. There is also a photo of a group of men together with Molly and Fiona Dixon, a young woman from the prominent Dixon family. Her father Charles, although shocked to learn that his daughter knew the "trashy" Molly, will not let Halloran question her.

Halloran eventually learns that Molly left Peter for a married man, Mark Roper, who is the club's secretary. Roper denies any involvement, and also claims that he was giving nurse Elizabeth Fenner a lift to her hospital at the time of the murder. The coroner Dr. Reese reveals Molly was two months pregnant. Dr. John Fenner, the local Canadian expat physician who certified the death, is asked by Halloran why he neglected to report that fact. Fenner claims he was trying to avoid a scandal for Roper and the club.

Elizabeth turns out to be Dr. Fenner's niece and also a Canadian expat. She confirms that Roper gave her a lift, but this later turns out to be a lie. A result of her attempts to protect the reputation of her uncle, who left his practice in Toronto after a misdiagnosis led to a patient's death. This is something the locals are unaware of, but Roper knows and is using this secret to blackmail the doctor.

Roper, always bragging about his wartime heroics as a RAF fighter pilot who achieved the rank of Wing Commander, is revealed by Halloran to have been nothing but a lowly ground crew member, who was dishonourably discharged after theft and is currently heavily in debt. The club demands Roper's resignation. He turns up at a party, gets drunk and starts a fight. Leaving the party and going for a walk, Fiona is ambushed and strangled to death. Her body is placed in the boot of Dr. Fenner's car.

Halloran finds out that Peter has been treated for schizophrenia. Peter flees to a church, climbs to the top of the steeple and threatens to jump. Halloran ascends the steeple to prevent the suicide, risking his own life in the process, and manages to convince Peter not to kill himself. A fire brigade turntable ladder rescues the two just as they are about to fall.

== Main cast ==
- John Mills as Superintendent Mike Halloran
- Charles Coburn as Dr. John Fenner
- Barbara Bates as Elizabeth Fenner
- Derek Farr as Mark Roper
- Alec McCowen as Peter Crowley
- Fay Compton as Mrs. Crowley
- Elizabeth Seal as Fiona Dixon
- Geoffrey Keen as Charles Dixon
- Margaretta Scott as Helen Dixon
- Meredith Edwards as Sergeant Rogers
- Harry Locke as Sergeant Beale
- Raymond Huntley as Dr. Reese
- Harry Fowler as Bandleader
- Maureen Connell as Mary Roper
- Magda Miller as Molly Stevens
- Newton Blick as Assistant Commissioner Beckett
- Oscar Quitak as David
- Totti Truman Taylor as Mrs. Gerrard
- Grace Arnold as Club Committee Woman
- Dandy Nichols as Mrs. Wilson (uncredited)

== Production ==
The film was based on an original script by Robert Westerby called The Nylon Web. In May 1956, it was announced the film would be a co-production between Marksman (Maxwell Setton's company) and Todon (a company owned by Donna Reed and her husband Tony Owen). John Guillermin would direct. (Todon made several films in Britain with American stars.)

In July, it was reported that Michael Rennie would star. However the lead roles went to John Mills and Charles Coburn. Filming began 8 August 1956. That month the title was changed to Town on Trial. Ella Raines was to play a key role, but had to drop out because her mother fell ill. She was replaced by Barbara Bates, then under contract to The Rank Organisation.

== Critical reception ==
The Monthly Film Bulletin wrote: "Despite sharp and efficient handling and a skilful choice of locations, this is a fundamentally artificial murder mystery with a predictable dénouement. Episodes designed to explain the reasons for Halloran's bullying tactics appear merely otiose and slacken the film's tempo considerably. John Mills, in an otherwise competent cast, seems ill at ease as the ruthless Scotland Yard superintendent. Town on Trial, though, has more drive than most thrillers of its type, even if this is mainly rather spurious and superficial."

Kine Weekly wrote: "John Mills contributes a fine performance as chip-on-the-shoulder Mike, Barbara Bates neatly handles the conventional love angle as Elizabeth and Charles Coburn, Derek Farr and Alex McCowen never show their hands until the finish as Fenner, Roper, and Peter. The police detail is impressive, while many big thrills are crowded into the last reels."

The Los Angeles Times said Guillermin "directs this picture at a furious pace."

According to the BFI, "Detractors have too often accused Guillermin of being merely a journeyman, lacking any real style of his own. The defence would do worse than to offer Town on Trial as its Exhibit A, drawing particular attention to its breathtaking PoV shot of the killer stalking a second victim that anticipates the camera gymnastics of Dario Argento."

A profile on John Guillermin called the film "a police procedural in which the lead investigator, in true Guillermin fashion, tears a community to pieces to expose every last lie. Imagine an English Mike Hammer, finding corruption wherever he goes, but too serious and proper to mix it up with the dames and too civic-minded to go ahead and torch the whole town."

FilmInk said "men driven by lust was a recurring theme of Hughes movies". A piece in the same magazine on Guillermin called the film "a little gem, a good, tough British crime film with no cosiness, a lot of pace, plenty of flourishes and energy in the direction."

In British Sound Films: The Studio Years 1928–1959, David Quinlan rated the film as "good", writing: "Well-made mystery with frightening murders and a tense climax."
