= The Secret Man (1959 film) =

1959 British film by Ronald Kinnoch

- Directed by: Ronald Kinnoch
- Screenplay by: Brian Clemens (as Tony O'Grady); Ronald Kinnoch
- Produced by: Ronald Kinnoch
- Starring: Marshall Thompson; John Loder; Anne Aubrey
- Cinematography: Geoffrey Faithfull
- Edited by: Peter Mayhew
- Music by: Albert Elms
- Production company: Amalgamated Productions
- Release date: 19 January 1959
- Running time: 68 minutes
- Country: United Kingdom
- Language: English

The Secret Man is a 1959 British second feature ('B') black-and-white film directed by Ronald Kinnoch and starring Marshall Thompson, John Loder and Anne Aubrey. It was written by Brian Clemens (as Tony O'Grady) and Kinnoch.

== Plot ==
Physicist Dr. Cliff Mitchell works at a top-secret research station. He and his assistant-fiancée Jill Warren helps Major Anderson of Special Branch to track down a spy inside the station. In order to infiltrate the spy ring, Mitchell poses as an outraged idealist.

== Cast ==
- Marshall Thompson as Dr. Cliff Mitchell
- John Loder as Major Anderson
- Anne Aubrey as Jill Warren
- Magda Miller as Ruth
- John Stuart as Dr. Warren
- Henry Oscar as John Manning
- Murray Kash as Waldo
- Michael Mellinger as Tony

== Reception ==
The Monthly Film Bulletin wrote: "This topical 'cloak and dagger' film places its thrills efficiently against realistic backgrounds in Hertfordshire and West London, but unfortunately fails to avoid such creaking clichés as the spy chief's femme fatale blonde agent, and the 'cricket match' attitude of the detectives towards their work. On the other hand the highly capable performance of veteran John Loder recalls Jack Warner, in similar parts, at his best."

Picture Show wrote: "Exciting mystery tale, realistically set. ... The topical story has plenty of action, some romance and a twist-ending."

Picturegoer wrote: "The cast really does its stuff and the surprise ending is sprung in spectacular circumstances. This film, realistically staged, not only keeps you guessing, but also carries quite a kick for its modest size."

In British Sound Films: The Studio Years 1928–1959 David Quinlan rated the film as "average", writing: "old-fashioned espionage drama, tiredly written but well performed; good surprise ending."

== Home media ==
The Secret Man was released as part of Renown Pictures Crime Collection DVD Volume 1 (2017).
