= Ronald Kinnoch =

British screenwriter and film producer (1910–1994)

- Born: 11 June 1910; Dundee, Scotland; United Kingdom
- Died: 22 November 1994 (aged 84); Los Angeles, California; United States
- Other name: Ronald George Barclay Kinnoch
- Occupations: Screenwriter; Producer
- Years active: 1936–1968

Ronald Kinnoch (1910–1994) was a British screenwriter and film producer. Among other films, he produced Escape Route (1952) with George Raft in the lead. Kinnoch also directed The Secret Man (1958).

== Selected filmography ==
=== Producer ===
- Melody of My Heart (1936)
- Escape Route (1952)
- Private Information (1952)
- Burnt Evidence (1954)
- The Secret Man (1959)
- Village of the Damned (1960)
- Man on a String (1960), a.k.a. Confessions of a Counterspy
- Invasion Quartet (1961)
- Postman's Knock (1962)
- Cairo (1963)
- The Ipcress File (1965)

=== Production Manager ===
- Beware of Pity (1946)
- Hungry Hill (1947)
- Anna Karenina (1948)
- The Winslow Boy (1948)
- Britannia Mews (1949)
- I was a Male War Bride (1949) a.k.a. You Can't Sleep Here
- Night and the City (1950)
- The Wonder Kid (1951)
- The Long Dark Hall (1951)
- Grip of the Strangler (1958)
- Fiend Without a Face (1958)

=== Director ===
- The Secret Man (1958)

== Bibliography ==
- Aaker, Everett. George Raft: The Films. McFarland, 2013.
