= Elizabeth Seal =

British actress (born 1933)

- Born: Elizabeth Anne Seal; 28 August 1933 (age 92); Genoa, Italy
- Occupations: Actress, Photographic Archivist
- Years active: 1950–present

Elizabeth Anne Seal (born 28 August 1933) is a British actress. In 1961, she won the Tony Award for Best Leading Actress in a Musical for her performance in the title role of Irma La Douce.

== Career ==
Elizabeth Seal made her professional debut, as a dancer, at the age of 17 in Ivor Novello's musical Gay's the Word (1951) at the Saville Theatre. She then appeared in The Glorious Days (1953) with Anna Neagle, and the revue Cockles and Champagne (1954).

Seal then shot to fame as 'Gladys' in the West End transfer of The Pajama Game by Richard Adler and Jerry Ross at the London Coliseum in 1955. For her performance Seal won the award for Most Promising Newcomer by the Variety Club of Great Britain. Whilst appearing in the show she made her film debut opposite John Mills, Alec McCowen and Charles Coburn in Town on Trial (1957), playing the role of 'Fiona'.

She made her debut in straight theatre when Peter Hall chose her to play the role of 'Esmeralda' in Tennessee Williams' play Camino Real, alongside Denholm Elliott, Diana Wynyard, and Harry Andrews. Seal then took over the role of Lola in Damn Yankees from Belita at the London Coliseum. This brought her another award from the Variety Club of Great Britain as Best Actress. During the run she made the film Cone of Silence (1960) with George Sanders, Bernard Lee, and Michael Craig.

Having seen Seal's performance in Damn Yankees theatre impresario Binkie Beaumont wanted to find a starring vehicle for Seal and found it in Marguerite Monnot's French musical Irma La Douce. The show was directed in London by Peter Brook, and Seal played the title role opposite Keith Michell at the Lyric Theatre. Seal stayed with the show for two years, during which time she was seen by David Merrick, who waited for her to become available when he produced the Broadway production of the musical in 1960. During the Broadway run, she won the 1961 Tony Award for Best Actress in a Musical.

After some further American shows including A Shot In The Dark, Exiles by James Joyce, and several cabaret appearances, Seal left the stage for a number of years to raise a family.

She returned to London in 1969 to appear in Beaumont's production of Cat Among The Pigeons directed by Jacques Charron of the Comédie-Française. A revival of Julian Slade and Dorothy Reynolds' musical Salad Days at the Duke of York's Theatre followed, and Seal later took over the role of 'Roxie Hart' in Chicago in the original London production, alongside Jenny Logan (who played Velma Kelly) in 1979. She returned once again to the Broadway stage in 1983 opposite Cicely Tyson in the revival of The Corn Is Green directed by ex brother-in-law, Vivian Matalon.

To devote more time to her private life Seal turned to teaching. She devised and choreographed shows for the Guildford School of Acting and Central School of Speech and Drama, and choreographed La Traviata for Welsh National Opera. During this time she also completed her master's degree.

After the death of her husband Michael Ward she returned to the stage in Ivor Novello's Gay's the Word in its first professional revival at the Finborough Theatre, and stayed with the show for its transfer to Jermyn Street Theatre in 2013.

She continues an active schedule as archivist to Michael Ward's photographic estate and library.

== Personal life ==
Seal has been married three times. Her first husband was advertising copywriter Peter Townsend, and second was actor, singer, writer and director Zack Matalon, with whom she had three children. Their eldest son Adam Matalon, based in Los Angeles, is a showrunner/creator and writes, directs and produces for TV; Writer, poet and songwriter Sarah Matalon-Levy is married and lives in Paris; their youngest son, Noah Matalon, lives and works in New York as a capital projects consultant and in property development.

She married photographer/former actor Michael Ward in 1976, and is stepmother to his two daughters Sam Ward and Tasha Clavel. Since Ward's death in 2011 Seal has promoted his work for exhibitions and publishing.

== Selected filmography ==
- Radio Cab Murder (1954)
- Town on Trial (1957)
- Cone of Silence (1960)
- Vampire Circus (1972)
- Mack the Knife (1989)
- Lara Croft Tomb Raider: The Cradle of Life (2003)

== Television ==
- March 9, 1962 - Route 66 Second season (1961-1962) "Blues for the Left Foot" Route 66, Episode 52. As dancer Rosemarie; Seal's second husband, Zack Matalon, played Pete.
- In the Softly, Softly: Task Force, Series Two, episode 15, Seal played gangster's sister, Mollie Frankitt, broadcast December 23rd 1970.
