= Magda Miller =

Scottish actress (born 1934)

- Born: 1934 (age 91–92); Strathblane, Stirlingshire, Scotland
- Occupation: Actress

Magda Miller (born Magdalena Ekaterina Antonina Vishinski Klastaites; in 1934) is a Scottish actress.

Born in Strathblane, Stirlingshire, she is of Scottish, Russian and Lithuanian descent.

She appeared in a number of films in the 1950s, notably in the mystery film Town on Trial, before turning towards acting in various TV series and programmes such as Maigret, Dixon of Dock Green, Tottering Towers, Public Eye and The Tripods, until the 1980s.

== Selected filmography ==
Year	Title	Role	Notes
1955	Dollars For Sale	Girl	Short Film
1956	Behind the Headlines	Nina Duke	
1957	Town on Trial	Molly Stevens	
1957	Let's Be Happy	Mrs. MacTavish	
1957	The Truth About Women	Bit role	Uncredited
1958	The Secret Man	Ruth	
1960	The Two Faces of Dr. Jekyll	Sphinx Girl	Uncredited
