= The Medusa Touch (film) =

1978 British film by Jack Gold

- Theatrical release poster
- Directed by: Jack Gold
- Screenplay by: John Briley
- Based on: The Medusa Touch (1973 novel) by Peter Van Greenaway
- Produced by: Anne V. Coates; Jack Gold
- Starring: Richard Burton; Lino Ventura; Lee Remick; Harry Andrews; Alan Badel; Marie-Christine Barrault; Michael Hordern; Gordon Jackson
- Cinematography: Arthur Ibbetson
- Edited by: Anne V. Coates; Ian Crafford
- Music by: Michael J. Lewis
- Production companies: Coatesgold; ITC Entertainment; Bulldog; Citeca Productions
- Distributed by: ITC Entertainment (UK)
- Release date: 7 April 1978 (UK)
- Running time: 109 minutes
- Countries: United Kingdom; France
- Language: English

The Medusa Touch is a 1978 supernatural horror thriller film directed and produced by Jack Gold, adapted by John Briley from the 1973 novel by Peter Van Greenaway. It stars Richard Burton, Lino Ventura, Lee Remick and Harry Andrews, and features Alan Badel, Derek Jacobi, Gordon Jackson, Jeremy Brett and Michael Hordern. The film is a co-production between the United Kingdom and France.

== Plot ==
Brunel, a French National Police detective on an exchange scheme in London, is assigned to investigate the apparent murder of novelist John Morlar. As they examine the crime scene, Brunel discovers the victim is still alive in spite of his severe head injuries and has him rushed to hospital.

With the help of Morlar's journals and Dr Zonfeld, a psychiatrist Morlar was consulting, Brunel reconstructs Morlar's life. Seen in flashback, it is filled with seemingly inexplicable catastrophes and the sudden deaths of people he disliked or who grievously offended him, beginning in childhood, when his parents were seemingly killed in an accident when their car ran into them and fell down a steep coastal cliff while on holiday. Morlar has become convinced that, consciously or unconsciously, he himself willed the things to happen. He had become even more convinced when a supposed psychic examined his hands, became greatly unsettled at what he foresaw, and refunded Morlar's fee. Zonfeld scoffs at this explanation, asking Morlar if he seriously believes in palmistry as a means of predicting the future.

As flashbacks continue, it becomes shown that Morlar has powerful telekinetic abilities. Morlar's earlier legal career is seen to have halted after a courtroom defence speech that reveals his disgust at the world and offends the judge resulting in a lengthy imprisonment for his client. He subconsciously curses the judge, who soon after dies of a heart attack with a look of unaccountable terror. Later, he proves to Zonfeld that he is the instrument of disaster when, with her watching, he forces a jumbo airliner to crash into a London office tower, killing everyone on board.

Brunel eventually concludes that Zonfeld has attempted to kill Morlar in order to stop him causing more disasters, the most recent, at the time that he was attacked, involving American astronauts on a space mission to the moon that is being widely broadcast in the media. Failing to get him to stop, she had bashed in Morlar's skull with a blunt object and left him for dead. Brunel confronts her and she admits trying to kill Morlar. Brunel does not arrest her right away, partly because he is also becoming convinced of Morlar's telekinetic powers. Later, Brunel returns to Zonfeld's office, but he discovers she has committed suicide, having left a note apologizing to him for leaving such a mess to deal with. From his hospital bed in a vegetative state Morlar manages to bring down a cathedral on the "unworthy heads" of a VIP congregation attending a royal fundraising event for the crumbling building's restoration.

Brunel races to the hospital and tries to kill Morlar by ripping out all tubes that are keeping him alive to end the destruction, just as Zonfeld had, but he, too, is unsuccessful. Morlar, who inexplicably remains alive, writes on a pad the name of his next target: Windscale nuclear power station.

== Cast ==
- Richard Burton as John Morlar
  - Cornelius Bowe as young John
  - Adam Bridges as John (age 10)
  - Joseph Clark as John (age 14)
- Lino Ventura as Detective Brunel
  - David de Keyser as Brunel's voice (uncredited)
- Lee Remick as Dr Zonfeld
- Harry Andrews as Assistant Commissioner
- Alan Badel as Quinton
- Marie-Christine Barrault as Patricia Morlar
- Jeremy Brett as Edward Parrish
- Michael Hordern as Altropos
- Gordon Jackson as Dr Johnson
- Derek Jacobi as Moulton
- Robert Lang as Pennington
- Michael Byrne as Sergeant Duff
- John Normington as Mr Copley
- Robert Flemyng as Judge McKinley
- Philip Stone as Dean
- Malcolm Tierney as Deacon
- Norman Bird as Major Henry Morlar
- Jennifer Jayne as Mrs Morlar
- Avril Elgar as Mrs Pennington
- James Hazeldine as Lovelass
- Wendy Gifford as Receptionist
- Shaw Taylor as TV Space Reporter
- Mark Jones as Sergeant Hughes
- Frances Tomelty as Nanny
- Stanley Lebor as Police Doctor
- Ian Marter as Detective
- George Innes as Driver
- Earl Rhodes as Parsons

In addition, Gordon Honeycombe, long-time newscaster on the ITN national news broadcast, appears as the TV newscaster on televisions being watched by various characters. During coverage of the space mission the voice of James Burke can briefly be heard, apparently in an audio recording from his coverage of the real Apollo 13 mission. Shaw Taylor, a well known figure on British TV at the time for his presentation of the crime programme Police 5, is seen on screen fronting the coverage of the space mission.

== Themes ==
That John Morlar (Richard Burton) is disgusted with the world is cited in Kim Newman's 1988 book Nightmare Movies, wherein Newman describes Morlar's dialogue as "incredibly misanthropic."

== Production ==
Trevor Howard was meant to play the role that Harry Andrews played but Howard collapsed drunk at a dinner and producer Elliot Kastner refused to work with him.

=== Filming locations ===
Bristol Cathedral was used as the location for the fictional London "Minster Cathedral".

The St Mary's Church Towers near Reculver in Kent were used for the scene where young John (Adam Bridges) and his parents Major Henry Morlar (Norman Bird) and Mrs. Morlar (Jennifer Jayne) are having a picnic whilst on holiday. John wills the car to move towards his parents, which causes them and the car to fall over the cliff. Herne Bay, also Kent, was used for the scene where a young John stays with his parents and is out on the seafront. The hotel is now residential properties.

== Reception ==
The Monthly Film Bulletin wrote: "In its early scenes ...The Medusa Touch establishes an intriguing premise on which to build the legend of a modern-day gorgon. ... From here on, however, the script skirts any further dealings with its characters ... and simply opts for an escalating series of increasingly ludicrous disasters. An excessive amount of time is devoted to the unmasking of Zonfeld as the would-be murderer – a revelation which comes as no surprise and which is no substitute for the script's failure to develop her psychiatric relationship with Morlar any further than the occasional offer of a sedative. The film is equally reticent about exploring the implications of its protagonist's malevolent powers, and attempts instead to spin things out with a few red herrings, mainly by suggesting that the many deaths in which Morlar has been implicated would have made him numerous enemies. The acting, inevitably, is as uneven as the film: Lee Remick is gradually reduced to blank, 'meaningful' stares; while Richard Burton, gravely intoning such lines as, 'I am the man with the power to create catastrophe', overacts unforgivably. Jack Gold directs with faceless efficiency ... The film, however, proves to have no truck with nuances and the effect turns out to be no more than a plain, TV-derived device for ploughing through the story."

== Cultural references ==
A sample from the film (Richard Burton's line "I will bring the whole edifice down on their unworthy heads") was used in the Manic Street Preachers' 1998 song "Ready for Drowning" from their album This Is My Truth Tell Me Yours. Their 2005 song "Leviathan" from the compilation album Help!: A Day in the Life includes the lyric "Baader Meinhof and Medusa Touch".

Footage from the film appears in the music video "The Madness Was Mine" by the artist Sailing Blind.

== See also ==
- Patrick, a 1978 Australian horror film
- Patrick, a 2013 Australian remake of the 1978 film
