= Behind the Headlines (1956 film) =

British crime drama by Charles Saunders

- Lobby card
- Directed by: Charles Saunders
- Written by: Allan MacKinnon
- Based on: Behind the Headlines (novel) by Robert Chapman
- Produced by: Guido Coen
- Starring: Paul Carpenter; Adrienne Corri; Hazel Court; Alfie Bass
- Cinematography: Geoffrey Faithfull
- Edited by: Margery Saunders
- Music by: Stanley Black
- Production company: Kenilworth Film Productions
- Distributed by: Rank Organisation
- Release date: July 1956
- Running time: 65 minutes
- Country: United Kingdom
- Language: English

Behind the Headlines is a 1956 'B' British crime film directed by Charles Saunders and starring Paul Carpenter, Adrienne Corri, Hazel Court and Alfie Bass. It was written by Allan MacKinnon based on the 1955 novel Behind the Headlines by Robert Chapman.

A male and female journalist join forces to hunt down a murderer.

== Plot ==
American Paul Banner used to be a reporter working in London. Recently leaving his paper, he has gone freelance, so that he can focus more on chasing down facts and selling his stories once he gets them. He has no regrets in leaving his job as there will be no more deadlines or misguided editors to divert his attention. He starts up a news service, Banners News Agency, whose motto is "ferret out the facts and sell them to the highest bidder."

When showgirl Nina Duke is murdered, the press are all harrying the police for statements and facts but Banner hangs back and does a little work of his own to uncover the story. Nina, it transpires, was previously in jail for blackmail, so it is possible that this was why she was killed. Banner initially falls for the affections of rival reporter Pam Barnes, but his true affections lie with his secretary, Maxine.

A race to find the killer has Banner trying to get the story that the police cannot.

== Cast ==
- Paul Carpenter as Paul Banner
- Adrienne Corri as Pam Barnes
- Hazel Court as Maxine
- Alfie Bass as Sammy
- Ewen Solon as Superintendent Faro
- Trevor Reid as Bunting
- Melissa Stribling as Mary Carrick
- Olive Gregg as Mrs. Bunting
- Harry Fowler as Alfie
- Magda Miller as Nina Duke
- Arthur Rigby as Hollings
- Leonard Williams as Jock Macrae
- Gaylord Cavallaro as Jeff Holly
- Tom Gill as Creloch
- Colin Rix as Bernard
- Anita Wuest as model
- Sandra Colville as waitress
- Marian Collins as nurse
- Constance Wake as receptionist

== Production ==
The film was made at Southall Studios.

Director Charles Saunders previously made One Jump Ahead (1955), which had many similarities to Behind the Headlines. The story of a news reporter investigating a murder, again played by Paul Carpenter, and from a story by Robert Chapman. Saunders specialised in the B movie at the Kenilworth Films Production house which turned out 11 mainly crime thrillers between 1948 and 1956.

== Critical reception ==
The Monthly Film Bulletin wrote: "Although this comedy thriller makes no attempt at originality, it is quite competently presented and played, and works amiably enough through its series of standarised situations/"

TV Guide concluded: "Weak script and stiff direction offer little suspense in this routine yarn."

The Radio Times wrote: "... this is elevated above the morass of British crime B-movies by a sure sense of newsroom atmosphere that owes more to Hollywood than Pinewood... there's a convincing seediness about the backstage milieu thanks to Geoffrey Faithfull's unfussy photography. It may lack suspense and newsman Paul Carpenter is short on charisma, but there's admirable support from the likes of Adrienne Corri, Hazel Court and Alfie Bass."
