= Peter Van Greenaway =

British novelist

Peter Van Greenaway (1927–1988) was a British novelist, the author of numerous thrillers with elements of horror and satire.

He was born and educated in London, worked briefly in commercial art and acted in theatre.

== Novels ==
Van Greenaway's first novel, The Crucified City, is the story of the aftermath of a nuclear attack on London. A motley group of people, accompanied by a mysterious, apparently mute man, undertake a last pilgrimage to Aldermaston. The action of the book takes place at Easter, and it appears that the mute, the last survivor, is the Second Coming of Jesus Christ.

Several of Van Greenaway's books are topical political thrillers. Take the War to Washington deals with the Vietnam War, and Suffer! Little Children with the Troubles in Northern Ireland. In The Man Who Held the Queen to Ransom and Sent Parliament Packing, a British army captain stages a coup d'état in the United Kingdom; the government he attempts to establish is seen as more democratic and far more benign than the establishment he (temporarily) overthrows.

Other of his novels incorporate elements of science fiction. In Manrissa Man, vivisection experiments result in a highly advanced species of ape which can reason and talk, while in Mutants a national emergency results from the production of a rapacious species of mouse.

Van Greenaway is probably best known for The Medusa Touch, which was made into a film starring Richard Burton. The story of a radically disenchanted novelist with highly destructive telekinetic powers. The Medusa Touch is one of several books featuring the character Inspector Cherry of Scotland Yard.

== Critical appraisal ==
The dialogue in The Medusa Touch was described by Kim Newman as "incredibly misanthropic".

Van Greenaway's writing is described in his Encyclopedia of Science Fiction entry as "the astringent, side-of-the-mouth pessimistic voice which became a trademark".

== Personal life ==
According to the Scotland's People website, which holds records for Scotland, Van Greenaway was married to his long-time partner and editor Marie Gladys Stroud in Inverness, Scotland, in 1984.

== Bibliography ==
- The Crucified City (1962)
- The Evening Fool (1964)
- The Man Who Held the Queen to Ransom and Sent Parliament Packing (1968)
- Judas! (1972, aka The Judas Gospel)
- The Medusa Touch (1973)
- Take the War to Washington (1974)
- Doppelganger (1975)
- Suffer! Little Children (1976)
- A Man Called Scavener (1978)
- The Destiny Man (1979)
- The Dissident (1980)
- "Cassandra" Bell (1981)
- Edgar Allan Who? Tales of Detection, Mystery and Horror (1981)
- The Lazarus Lie (1982)
- Manrissa Man (1982)
- Graffiti (1983)
- The Immortal Coil (1985)
- Mutants (1986)
- The Killing Cup (1987)
