= Village of the Damned (1960 film) =

1960 British film by Wolf Rilla

- U.S. theatrical release poster
- Directed by: Wolf Rilla
- Screenplay by: Stirling Silliphant; Wolf Rilla; Ronald Kinnoch
- Based on: The Midwich Cuckoos (1957 novel) by John Wyndham
- Produced by: Ronald Kinnoch
- Starring: George Sanders; Barbara Shelley; Michael Gwynn
- Cinematography: Geoffrey Faithfull
- Edited by: Gordon Hales
- Music by: Ron Goodwin
- Production company: Metro-Goldwyn-Mayer
- Distributed by: Loew's
- Release dates: 7 December 1960 (LA & NYC)
- Running time: 77 minutes
- Countries: United Kingdom; United States
- Language: English
- Budget: $320,000
- Box office: $2,175,000

Village of the Damned is a 1960 science fiction horror film by Anglo-German director Wolf Rilla. The film is adapted from the novel The Midwich Cuckoos (1957) by John Wyndham. The lead role of Professor Gordon Zellaby is played by George Sanders.

A sequel, Children of the Damned (1964), followed, as did a remake, also called Village of the Damned (1995).

== Plot ==
In the British village of Midwich, the villagers fall unconscious, as do the animals and other people entering Midwich. The military establishes a cordon around Midwich; they discover that a caged canary becomes unconscious upon being placed in Midwich's border, but regains consciousness when removed. They then send in a man wearing a gas mask who also falls unconscious and is pulled back with a rope. The pilot of a military reconnaissance plane is contacted and asked to investigate. While flying below 5,000 feet (1,500 m), he loses consciousness and the plane crashes. A five-mile (8.0-kilometre) exclusion zone around the village is established for all aircraft. After approximately four hours, the villagers regain consciousness, and all are apparently unaffected by the time-out.

Two months later, all Midwich women and girls of child-bearing age are discovered to be pregnant. Doctor Willers deduces that all the expectant women and girls conceived on the same day as the time-out. Seven-month fetuses appear after only five months. All the pregnant women and girls give birth on the same day. Their children have an unusual appearance, including "arresting" eyes, odd scalp hair construction and colour (platinum blond), and unusually narrow fingernails. The children grow and develop at a rapid rate. They have a powerful telepathic bond with one another.

Three years later, the children are precocious, physically and mentally the equivalent of children four times their age. Their behaviour has become even more unusual. They dress impeccably, always walk as a group, speak in an adult manner, and behave maturely, but show no conscience or love, and demonstrate a coldness to others, causing the villagers and dogs to fear and shun them.

Professor Gordon Zellaby, whose "son" David is one of the children, attends a meeting with British Intelligence to discuss them. There, he and his brother-in-law, Major Alan Bernard, learn that Midwich is just one of several places on Earth where time-outs happened, all on the same day and resulting in similar children: in a northern Australian town, all the children died within ten hours of birth; in an Eskimo community, the members killed the children, believing they were not theirs; in Mongolia, the men killed both the children and their mothers; in Russia, all the children survived and are being educated. The men theorise that the children themselves are of extraterrestrial origin. Zellaby is eager to work with the children, and gains permission to teach them in the hopes of learning more about them.

The Midwich children begin to exhibit the power to read minds and to force people to do things against their will. There have been a number of villagers' deaths since the children were born, many of which are considered unusual, and some citizens believe the children are responsible. This is confirmed when the children are seen killing a man—who had accidentally hit one of them with his car—by making him crash into a wall, and again when they force his suspicious brother to shoot himself.

The children move to a separate school building where they will learn and live. While the children continue to exert their will, Bernard informs Zellaby that the Soviet government has wiped out its country's population of children by firing a nuclear shell at the Russian village where they lived (a prior attempt to remove them with soldiers ended in disaster). The villagers were also killed as no warning had been given to deprive the children of knowledge of the attack. A group of Midwich men form an angry mob and march to the school, only for the children to force one of them to burn himself to death. Bernard confronts the children, who say that nothing can stop them and use their power to send him into shock.

When Bernard recovers, Zellaby sends him and his sister, Zellaby's wife Anthea, on a road trip to London. Zellaby then takes a hidden time-bomb to a session with the children and tries to block their awareness of the device by visualizing a brick wall. The children scan Zellaby's mind, eventually breaking down his mental wall and discovering the truth seconds before the bomb detonates, consuming the building in flames and killing everyone in the school, including Zellaby.

== Cast ==
- George Sanders as Gordon Zellaby
- Barbara Shelley as Anthea Zellaby
- Martin Stephens as David Zellaby
- Michael Gwynn as Alan Bernard
- Laurence Naismith as Doctor Willers
- Richard Warner as Mr. Harrington
- Jenny Laird as Mrs. Harrington
- Sarah Long as Evelyn Harrington
- Thomas Heathcote as James Pawle
- Denis Gilmore as Keith Harrington (uncredited)
- Charlotte Mitchell as Janet Pawle
- Pamela Buck as Milly Hughes
- Rosamund Greenwood as Miss Ogle
- Susan Richards as Mrs. Plumpton
- Bernard Archard as vicar
- Peter Vaughan as P.C. Gobby
- John Phillips as General Leighton
- Richard Vernon as Sir Edgar Hargraves
- John Stuart as Professor Smith
- Keith Pyott as Dr. Carlisle
- June Cowell as village child
- Alexander Archdale as coroner

== Production ==
=== Development ===
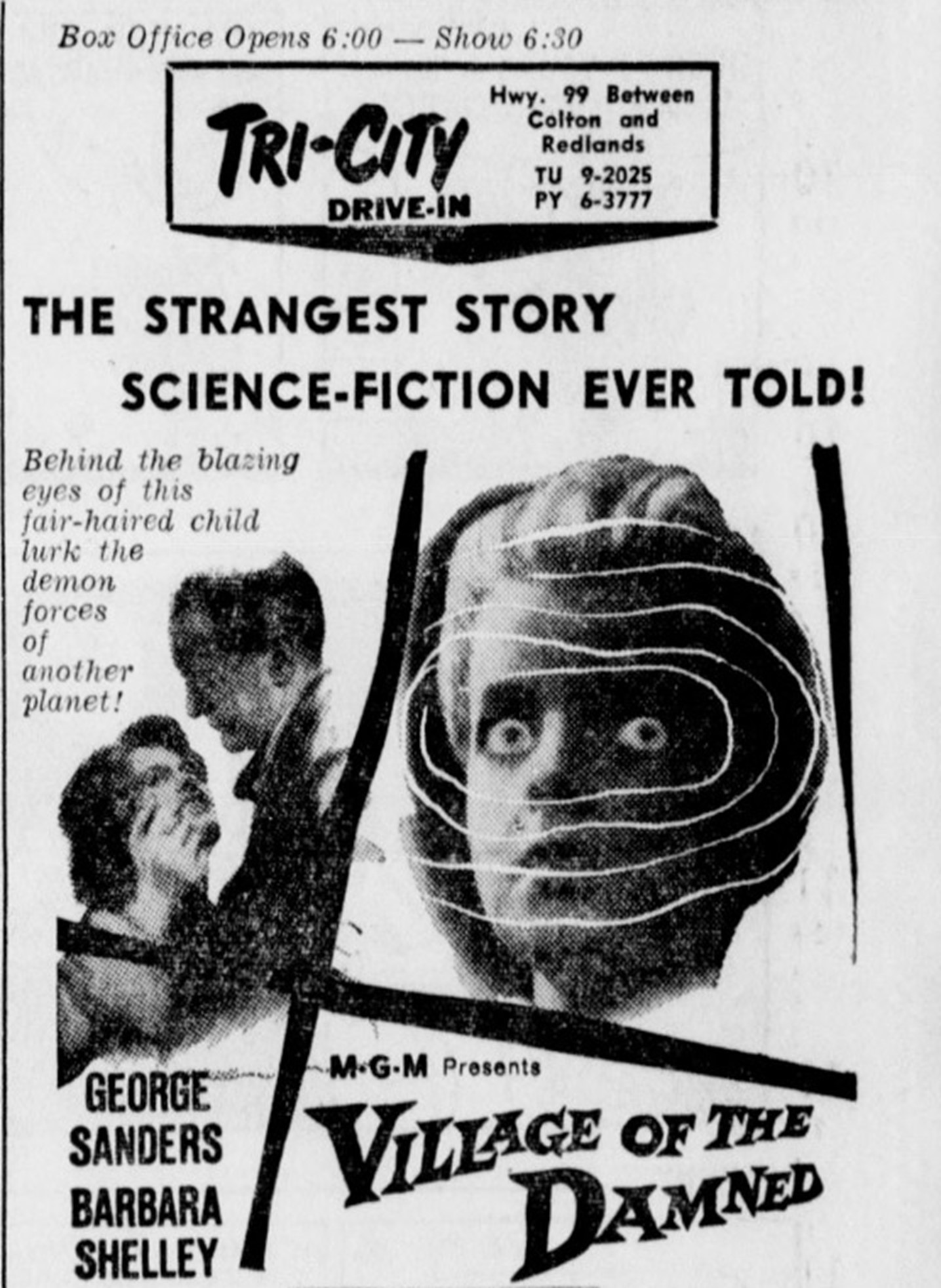
Drive-in advertisement from 1960.

Metro-Goldwyn-Mayer acquired the film rights in June 1957, prior to the novel's publication. Milo Frank was assigned to produce and John Lupton was announced as a possible star.

By December, the title had been changed to Village of the Damned and Russ Tamblyn, who appeared as the lead in MGM's Tom Thumb (1958), was named as a possible star. In January 1958, MGM president Joseph R. Vogel announced the film would be among the movies made by the studio that year. Robert Stevens signed to direct.

The film was originally intended as an American production, to be filmed at the MGM studios in Culver City, California. Stirling Silliphant wrote a script in 1957 writing the character of George Zellaby with Ronald Colman in mind, Colman who was already suffering ill health in 1957, was never officially connected with the project, died in May 1958. (His widow, actress Benita Hume, married actor George Sanders in 1959, and Sanders was cast in the role meant for Colman.)

In September 1958, Michael Rennie said he was being considered for the lead. In October, Mel Dinelli was reportedly working on a script. In January 1959, Julia Meade signed to play a lead role.

=== Move to UK ===
In November 1959, production of the film was transferred to the MGM-British Studios and George Sanders was cast in the lead role. It would be the first film from MGM's British operations under Lawrence Bachmann.

Six weeks before filming was to begin, the project was passed to television director Wolf Rilla. He thought the script by Stirling Silliphant "needed a lot of work to make it realistic. It was written by an American who had not gained a great deal of knowledge concerning English life; it just rang false." Rilla was told he had a single weekend to make changes so he and Ronald Kinnoch, now the producer, collaborated. "I still don't think the script was as good as it could have been but there simply wasn't time," said Rilla.

The film had a shooting schedule of six weeks and a budget of £82,000. Most filming took place at MGM's Borehamwood Studio but it was also shot on location in the village of Letchmore Heath, near Watford, approximately 12 miles (19 kilometres) north of London. Local buildings such as The Three Horseshoes Pub and Aldenham House (which subsequently became part of The Haberdashers' Aske's School, Elstree) were used during filming.

Rilla used a "very low-key documentary manner. It made, I think, the strange happenings even stranger... the horrors were so much more horrible because they were so much more normal.".

The glowing-eye effect, when the children used their mental powers, was achieved by creating animated overlays of a bright white iris; this created a bright glowing iris with a black pupil when optically printed into the film. This technique was used mostly on freeze-frame shot to create the required effect; the only sequence of live motion processed in this way was the scene in which David tells Alan Bernard to "leave us alone" where the eye effect appears as David speaks. The other time David's eyes go from normal to glowing on screen (after one of the girl children is nearly run down by a car), a two shot of the girl and David, is a composite shot split by a slightly jagged black line; the half with the girl is live motion, with her hair visibly moving in the breeze, whereas the half with David is a freeze frame with the eye effect added.

A similar split screen effect is used during the first scene of a boy and girl using their powers to stop their 'brother' stealing a puzzle box; the close ups of the mother holding the boy as his eyes begin to glow and she turns to look at him are achieved as above this time without a black line separating the freeze frames of the boy from the live motion of the mother. The final effect of the children's eyes zooming out of the flames of their burning school house utilized multiple exposures of a model head with glowing eyes which the camera zoomed in on.

For the original release of the film in Britain, censors required the glowing eye effects not be used in the British version of the film to get an 'A' certificate rather than an 'X'- so a UK version without the glowing eyes was produced, in which effects show that during the final sequence, in the close-ups, the kids widen their eyes as they attack Zellaby's mind, unlike the freeze frames with added glowing eyes used in the American prints. Another example is a slight smile that David makes after setting one of the villagers on fire in the UK print; the freeze frames of the American print do not contain such subtle detail. This print also has a credit for being filmed at MGM's British studios that is not on the American prints.

== Release ==
=== Theatrical release ===
Given an 'A' certificate by the British censors, the film opened in June 1960 at The Ritz cinema in Leicester Square, London. According to director Wolf Rilla, it soon attracted audiences, and cinema goers queued round the block to see it. In December of the same year it was released in New York and Los Angeles; a significant publicity campaign by MGM in the US led to it becoming a box office success.

=== Home media ===
MGM first released the VHS format on April 27, 1995. The film was also released on DVD by Warner Home Video on August 10, 2004, and on Blu-ray by Warner Archive Collection on July 21, 2018.

== Reception ==
=== Box office ===
According to MGM records the film earned $1.4 million in the US and Canada and $775,000 elsewhere, resulting in a profit of $860,000. Kine Weekly called it a "money maker" at the British box office in 1960. By 1962 plans were under way for a sequel.

=== Critical ===
The Monthly Film Bulletin wrote: "The solution of this excellent adaptation from John Wyndham's The Midwich Cuckoos can be recommended for its ruthless ingenuity, the story is original as these things go and has grip, the village background is pleasing and Wolf Rilla's direction (except for some irksome glimpses of George Sanders' marital bliss) both sharp and discreet. Altogether, in fact, with chillingly effective performances from the children to add to the tension, this is probably the neatest science fiction film yet to have come out of a British studio."

The 18 June 1960 edition of The Guardian praised the story as "most ingenious" and Rilla as applying "the right laconic touch."

For The Observer C.A. Lejeune wrote: "The further you have moved away from fantasy, the more you will understand its chill".

Ernest Betts wrote in The People: "As a horror film with a difference, it'll give you the creeps for 77 minutes."

Dilys Powell in The Sunday Times stated on 20 June 1960: "Well made British film: the effective timing, the frightening matter-of-factness of the village setting, most of the acting, and especially the acting of the handsome flaxen-haired children (headed by Martin Stevens) who are the cold villains of the piece."

The Time reviewer called it "one of the neatest little horror pictures produced since Peter Lorre went straight" and questioned the wisdom of MGM's low-profile release strategy.

While not willing to call it a horror classic, Howard Thompson of The New York Times wrote, "as a quietly civilized exercise in the fear and power of the unknown this picture is one of the trimmest, most original and serenely unnerving little chillers in a long time."

The film received a small but positive mention in the Saturday Review which called it "an absorbing little picture that you may yet be able to find on some double-feature bill."

Author and film critic Leonard Maltin gave the film three out of a possible four stars, calling it "[an] eerie, well-made chiller."

On Rotten Tomatoes, the film has an approval rating of 93%, based on 40 reviews, with an average rating of 7.6/10. The website's critical consensus reads, "Chilling performances and a restrained, eerie atmosphere make this British horror both an unnerving parable of its era and a timeless classic." On Metacritic, the film has a weighted average score of 77 out of 100 based on 7 critics, which the site labels as "generally favorable" reviews. The climactic scene in which the children break down Zellaby's mental brick wall is #92 on the Bravo miniseries 100 Scariest Movie Moments.

== Sequel and remake ==
An MGM-British sequel, Children of the Damned, directed by Anton M. Leader, was released in 1964 with a smaller group of six children (each one from a different nation: China, India, Nigeria, the Soviet Union, the United States and the UK). Although their powers are similar, the theme and tone are nearly opposite, with the children in the sequel being portrayed as sympathetic characters.

A US-produced remake was released in 1995 by Universal. Also titled Village of the Damned, the film was directed by John Carpenter and moved to a contemporary time period and an American setting. It was not well received by critics and performed poorly at the box office.

== Cultural references ==
Simpson's episode Wild Barts Can't Be Broken features a parody of the movie.

== See also ==
- Stepford Cuckoos
