= The Medusa Touch =

1973 novel by Peter Van Greenaway

- Cover of the first edition
- Author: Peter Van Greenaway
- Language: English
- Genre: Thriller novel
- Publisher: Gollancz
- Publication date: 1973
- Publication place: United Kingdom
- Media type: Print (Hardback & Paperback)

The Medusa Touch is a 1973 novel by Peter Van Greenaway, which was adapted into a feature film in 1978.

The novel tells the story of a novelist, John Morlar, who either has psychokinesis or clairvoyance.

The Medusa Touch is one of several Van Greenaway books featuring the character Inspector Cherry of Scotland Yard.

The 1978 movie version starred actor Richard Burton as Morlar.
