= Jack Trevor Story =

British novelist (1917–1991)

- Born: 30 March 1917; Hertford, England
- Died: 5 December 1991 (aged 74); Milton Keynes, England
- Other names: Alex Atwell; Bret Harding; Rex Riotti
- Notable work: The Trouble with Harry; Live Now, Pay Later; Something for Nothing; The Urban District Lover; I Sit in Hanger Lane; One Last Mad Embrace; Hitler Needs You His estate is represented by Michael Moorcock.

Jack Trevor Story (30 March 1917 – 5 December 1991) was a British novelist, publishing prolifically from the 1940s to the 1970s. His best-known works are the 1949 comic mystery The Trouble with Harry (which was adapted for Alfred Hitchcock's 1955 film of the same name), the Albert Argyle trilogy (Live Now, Pay Later, Something for Nothing and The Urban District Lover), and his Horace Spurgeon novels (I Sit in Hanger Lane, One Last Mad Embrace, Hitler Needs You). He also wrote under the names Alex Atwell, Bret Harding and Rex Riotti.

== Early life ==
Story was born in Hertford, England, in 1917, the son of a baker's roundsman and a domestic servant. During the First World War his father was killed, after which his mother moved to Cambridge and worked in one of the colleges. As a young boy, Story worked as a butcher's lad making local deliveries. He stated that his early education was derived from The Modern Boy, Melody Maker and Action publications.

== Career ==
Later, as a writer, it was stated that he regularly wrote 4,000 words a day and took only two or three weeks to finish a novel; he even wrote one in just 10 days. Often he was seen with many glamorous women, which amazed his many friends and acquaintances, and for which he gained a reputation.

His domestic life was chaotic, owing to his serial infidelity and bankruptcy; this often provided the inspiration for his work. He was from a working-class background and was essentially self-taught as a writer, basing his approach on that of his idol William Saroyan. He first achieved success as a genre writer, with the Pinetop Jones Western stories (writing as Bret Harding); he later contributed to the Sexton Blake detective series. His writing is unpretentious and effective, although it often assumes the reader's sympathies lie with the protagonist even when behaving poorly. Politically he was determinedly anti-establishment.

== Later life ==
When he was penniless in the 1970s he moved to the then new town of Milton Keynes, where he was given a flat above the Museum of Rural Life as the "writer and poet in residence" of the town, which was still being built around him. At that time (1976–1979), Milton Keynes had its own black-and-white TV station, broadcasting for a few hours daily. Story was seen frequently on the station. He meant to stay in Milton Keynes only one year, but remained there for the rest of his life.

Although his later works never reached a wide audience, he was respected by many in the media. He wrote a weekly column for The Guardian in the 1970s, and appeared on TV in the series Jack on the Box in 1979. He wrote several screenplays, including the 1962 TV play Mix Me a Person, and the film version of Live Now, Pay Later, as well as successful films for Anna Neagle and Herbert Wilcox: These Dangerous Years (1957), Wonderful Things! (1958) and The Heart of a Man (1959). Story's final broadcast was an audio diary, Jack's Last Tape.

== Family ==
Story was married three times, was divorced once and had eight children. Two of his wives predeceased him. His children include Peter Story, Jennifer Curr (Story) Caroline Story Jacqueline Edwards (Story), Christine Sears (Story), Lee Story.

== Selected bibliography ==
Series

- Pinetop Jones (as by Bret Harding)
- Fugitive (1953)
- Guns Of Pecos (1953)
- Renegade (1953)
- Appointment in Topeka (1954)
- Blood Feud (1954)
- California in the Morning (1954)
- Oregon Grab (1954)
- South of Arroyo (1954)
- Vigilante (1954)

Albert Argyle

- Live Now, Pay Later (Secker & Warburg, 1963)
- Something for Nothing (1963)
- The Urban District Lover (1964)
- Albert Rides Again (Allison & Busby/ W. H. Allen, 1990)
- Live Now, Pay Later Trilogy (omnibus) (1989)

Horace Spurgeon Fenton

- I Sit in Hanger Lane (1968)
- Hitler Needs You (Allison and Busby, 1970)
- One Last Mad Embrace (Allison and Busby, 1970)

Novels

- The Trouble with Harry (T.V. Boardman, 1949; Macmillan, New York; Leveret Press, 1985)
- Protection for a Lady (1950)
- Green to Pagan Street (1952)
- Scarlet Widow (1953) (as by Rex Riotti)
- Brother Satan (1954) (as by Alex Atwell)
- Horse Thief Trail (1954) (as by Alex Atwell)
- Legacy of Lead (1954) (as by Alex Atwell)
- Murder On My Mind (1955)
- The Trouble with Trudy (1955)
- The Money Goes Round and Round (Alvin Redman, 1958)
- Murder in the Sun (1958)
- Nine o'Clock Shadow (1958)
- Mix Me a Person (1959)
- Man Pinches Bottom (1962)
- Dishonourable Member (1969)
- Little Dog's Day (Allison and Busby, 1971)
- Wind in the Snottygobble Tree (Allison and Busby, 1971)
- Crying Makes Your Nose Run (David Bruce & Watson, 1974)
- Morag's Flying Fortress (1976)
- Up River (1979)

Omnibus

- Story on Crime (1975)

== Legacy ==
The Jack Trevor Story Memorial Cup is an award maintained by his friend Michael Moorcock, the winner being determined by a special committee organized by Moorcock. The prize money is given on the condition that "the entire award must be spent 'in a week to a fortnight' and the recipient must have nothing to show for it. Most winners use the money for a big night or a foreign vacation. One winner, a trawlerman from Hull who spent the money with the expertise of a drunken sailor before he got home, had to spend the money all over again just to prove to his shipmates that he’d won it."

The conditions echo what Story reportedly said at his second bankruptcy when asked in court where the money from his films had gone: "You know how it is, your honour ‑ two hundred or two thousand ‑ it always lasts a week to a fortnight. You can spend a couple of hundred easy just going around the supermarket." Winners of the Jack Trevor Story Memorial Cup include Fred Normandale, Steve Aylett, Nicholas Lezard and Howard Waldrop.
