= Charters and Caldicott =

Fictional characters

- Basil Radford and Naunton Wayne as Charters and Caldicott in Night Train to Munich.
- First appearance: The Lady Vanishes
- Last appearance: Charters and Caldicott
- Created by: Sidney Gilliat and Frank Launder
- Portrayed by: Basil Radford and Naunton Wayne (1938–1943); Arthur Lowe and Ian Carmichael (1979); Robin Bailey and Michael Aldridge (1985)

In-universe information
- Gender: Male
- Occupation: Businessmen/Military Officers
- Religion: Christian
- Nationality: English

Charters and Caldicott are a fictional pair of cricket-obsessed English gentlemen, created by Frank Launder and Sidney Gilliat for the 1938 Alfred Hitchcock film The Lady Vanishes. They were initially played by Basil Radford and Naunton Wayne. The pairing was so popular that Radford and Wayne portrayed them in three other feature films and played similar characters in several other films and in several BBC Radio productions.

Charters and Caldicott were played by other actors in the 1979 remake of the original film, and in their own BBC Television continuation series in 1985 with Charters and Caldicott.

== Radford and Wayne's appearances ==
In their first appearance, in the 1938 Alfred Hitchcock film The Lady Vanishes, Charters and Caldicott are single-minded cricket enthusiasts, whose only concern is to get back to England to see the last days of a Test match. They proved so popular with audiences that they returned in the Gilliat and Launder film Night Train to Munich (1940). They also appeared in two BBC radio serials, Crook's Tour (1941, also made into a film later that year) and Secret Mission 609 (1942).

In Crook's Tour, their names are shown entered in a hotel register as Hawtrey Charters and Sinclair Caldicott. Their last screen billing as Charters and Caldicott was in Millions Like Us (1943). They were intended to reappear in I See a Dark Stranger (1946, Launder), but Launder and Gilliat refused to give them the larger roles in the film that Radford and Wayne demanded, as befitting the high-profile actors they had then become. As a result, the actors opted out of the film and two similar but differently named characters were substituted. This falling out, however, left Radford and Wayne contractually disallowed from portraying the characters under the names "Charters" and "Caldicott".

Despite this, Wayne and Radford continued in the same vein, playing similar double acts in several more movies, such as Dead of Night (1945, sequence directed by Charles Crichton), A Girl in a Million (1946, Francis Searle) and Passport to Pimlico (1949, Henry Cornelius). The cricket-mad Bright and Early in It's Not Cricket (1949, Alfred Roome) are particularly similar to Charters and Caldicott.

In the first draft of Graham Greene's screenplay for The Third Man, two Charters and Caldicott-type characters called Carter and Tombs were originally intended to be in the film, again played by Radford and Wayne. However, by the final draft they had been condensed into one character, Crabbit, eventually played by Wilfrid Hyde-White in the film.

In Jonathan Coe's novel Expo 58, a pair of Foreign Office employees called Radford and Wayne appear, in a nod to Charters and Caldicott.

=== Film appearances ===
- The Lady Vanishes (1938)
- Night Train to Munich (1940)
- Crook's Tour (1941)
- Millions Like Us (1943)

Radford and Wayne's remaining film appearances together are listed below. Most of these films arguably utilised Charters and Caldicott's characteristics and certainly capitalised on the popularity of the actors' partnership. The characters' names are listed with Radford's role first.

- The Next of Kin (1942) as careless talkers on train
- Dead of Night (1945) as Parratt and Potter
- A Girl in a Million (1946) as Prendergast and Fotheringham
- Quartet (1948) as Garnet and Leslie
- It's Not Cricket (1949) as Bright and Early (footage reused for the 1949 comedy Helter Skelter)
- Passport to Pimlico (1949) as Gregg and Straker
- Stop Press Girl (1949) as the mechanical types

=== Stage appearances ===
Due to the success of The Lady Vanishes, Radford and Wayne soon appeared on the London stage in the play Giving the Bride Away by Margot Neville (pseudonym for Margot Goyder and Anne Neville Joske in collaboration with Gerald Kirby). The play opened on 1 December 1939 and ran for 57 performances.

=== Radio appearances ===
As with their film appearances, Radford and Wayne appeared in various guises on radio. They were still essentially Charters and Caldicott, but with their characters renamed for rights reasons. Self-contained eight-part radio series, made roughly annually, were very popular on BBC Radio at the time and they starred in the following:

- As "Woolcott and Spencer" in Double Bedlam (1946) and Traveller's Joy (1947)
- As "Berkeley and Bulstrode" in Crime Gentleman, Please (1948)
- As "Hargreaves and Hunter" in Having a Wonderful Crime (1949)
- As "Fanshaw and Fothergill" in That's My Baby (1950)
- As "Straker and Gregg", a continuation of their roles in the film Passport to Pimlico, in May I Have The Treasure (1951) and Rogue's Gallery (1952)

In mid-production on Rogue's Gallery, Radford died suddenly of a heart attack, aged 55, leaving Wayne to complete the adventure on his own.

== Other portrayals ==
Hammer Films' 1979 version of The Lady Vanishes cast Arthur Lowe as Charters and Ian Carmichael as Caldicott.

In 1985 a BBC television series, Charters and Caldicott, was set in the modern day and starred Robin Bailey as Charters and Michael Aldridge as Caldicott.

The BBC's 2013 telemovie The Lady Vanishes was based directly on Ethel Lina White's novel The Wheel Spins, rather than on Hitchcock's film, and consequently Charters and Caldicott were not included.
