= Robin Bailey =

English actor (1919–1999)

- Born: William Henry Mettam Bailey; 5 October 1919; Hucknall, Nottinghamshire, England
- Died: 14 January 1999 (aged 79); Wandsworth, London, England

William Henry Mettam "Robin" Bailey (5 October 1919 – 14 January 1999) was an English actor. He was born in Hucknall, Nottinghamshire.

Often cast in upper class and tradition-bound roles such as Mr Justice Graves in Thames Television's Rumpole of the Bailey, Bailey is also known for his portrayal of Uncle Mort in I Didn't Know You Cared, the BBC's adaptation of Peter Tinniswood's stories about an extended Yorkshire family. The television series ran from 1975 to 1979. Bailey also collaborated with Tinniswood on the television and radio series Tales from a Long Room, playing the Brigadier, an eccentric cricket-lover with a fund of extraordinary tales about the game and its players.

== Early life and education ==
Bailey was born at Hucknall, Nottinghamshire, the son of china and glass merchant George Henry Bailey and Thirza Ann (née Mettam). He was educated at the Henry Mellish Grammar School, Nottingham.

== Early career ==
After working for some years at the Post Office, Bailey was employed by the War Office in the 1930s, where he encountered amateur dramatics; and made his stage debut in The Barretts of Wimpole Street at the Theatre Royal, Nottingham, in 1938. He acted in repertory at Newcastle upon Tyne and joined the Army in 1940. Demobilized in 1944, he returned to the stage at the Alexandra Theatre, Birmingham.

Bailey first appeared on film in 1946, in School for Secrets, directed by Peter Ustinov, and other parts followed. He made his London stage debut in 1947, as Ludovico in Othello at the Piccadilly Theatre, and his first television appearance in 1950. Many more roles followed in all three media, and Bailey became a voice actor for BBC Radio as well.

== Theatre ==
In 1959, Bailey was engaged by the Australian theatrical producers J.C. Williamson Limited to play the part of Professor Henry Higgins in their production of the Lerner & Lowe musical My Fair Lady. The production was a duplicate of the New York City production. Although Bailey's was not a name that could attract large audiences in Australia or elsewhere, Williamson's had a policy at that time of preferring to cast lead players that they could bill as "direct from the West End", even if unknown; it was felt that an actor with that billing would always attract larger audiences than an Australian. Bailey also had a helpful resemblance to Rex Harrison who had created the Higgins part in London and New York, on record and in the eventual film of the work. Bailey, like Harrison, was not a singer; like Harrison, he handled the semi-spoken songs adeptly.

Williamson's also imported a female lead Bunty Turner who likewise was not a name that would have itself drawn large audiences, but who had a striking resemblance to Julie Andrews who had created the role of Eliza Doolittle in New York and London and would be supplanted by Audrey Hepburn in the film.

The musical was a huge success in Australia and a second company was created so it could continue its run in Melbourne and make its essential move on to Sydney where the Empire Theatre was being rebuilt and renamed Her Majesty's Theatre especially for the Sydney season of My Fair Lady. Bailey moved to Sydney with the production and the Williamson production of My Fair Lady between the two companies, toured all over Australia, South Africa and New Zealand for more than five years. It would become the highest grossing Australian theatrical production of all time, based on the number of paid admissions.

Bailey later visited Australia to play Martin Lynch-Gibbon in A Severed Head by Iris Murdoch from a novel by the playwright, a role he had created in London and New York. This had been an attempt to exploit the popularity Bailey had gained in My Fair Lady but like its overseas predecessors, was unsuccessful.

Bailey's Broadway theatre experience consisted of two flops: the 1963 musical Jennie, and the 1964 comedy A Severed Head.

== Television appearances ==
Robin Bailey appeared as Mr. Hale in the 1975 TV serial adaptation of Elizabeth Gaskell's "North and South". The series also co-starred Patrick Stewart as John Thornton and Tim Pigott-Smith as Frederick Hale.

In 1981, he appeared in Sorry, I'm A Stranger Here Myself.

He was the subject of This Is Your Life in 1982 when he was surprised by Eamonn Andrews at the Savoy Hotel in London.

In 1983, he took over from Arthur Lowe (who had died) in the title role of Roy Clarke's BBC television sitcom Potter, about a busybody former sweet manufacturer with time on his hands following retirement. The series co-starred John Barron as the Vicar. Potter ran for three series, the first two with Lowe and the third with Bailey.

He also played Charters in the 1985 mini-series Charters and Caldicott (the supposed latter-day adventures of two supporting characters from The Lady Vanishes) co-starring Michael Aldridge as Caldicott; and Sir Leicester Dedlock in the 1985 BBC adaptation of Bleak House.

Other roles included suave civil servant Grainger in The Power Game (1966), the actor Gerald Maitland in an episode of Upstairs Downstairs ("The Hero's Farewell", 1974), and Neville Chamberlain in The Gathering Storm and Prime Minister Gresham in The Pallisers. He played the role of Mr Fuzziwig in KYTV's The Making of David Chizzlenut episode in 1993. He also played Mr Justice Gerald Graves in Rumpole of the Bailey (1987 to 1992), and Hereward Fielding in the An Autumn Shroud episode of BBC's Dalziel and Pascoe series in 1996. His final television appearance was as Lord Probyn (Kavanagh's wife's father) in Kavanagh QC in 1997.

== Other work ==
Bailey performed several books on tape, reading books by Agatha Christie, Catherine Aird, Nevil Shute and Ruth Rendell.

Agatha Christie

- The Murder of Roger Ackroyd
- The Clocks
- Sparkling Cyanide
- Ordeal by Innocence

Catherine Aird

- A Religious Body
- A Late Phoenix
- The Stately Home Murders
- Henrietta Who?
- A Dead Liberty
- Parting Breath
- The Complete Steel

Nevil Shute

- A Town Like Alice
- The Rainbow and the Rose
- No Highway
- The Far Country
- Ruined City

Ruth Rendell

- No More Dying Then
- Wolf to the Slaughter
- Best Man to Die
- The Veiled One
- Murder Being Once Done

== Family ==
He was married to Patricia Mary Weekes from 6 September 1941 until her death on 2 October 1993. They had three children. His son Simon Bailey was Keeper of the Archives at Oxford University.

== Death ==
He died on 14 January 1999 aged 79 in Wandsworth, London, of respiratory failure.

== Selected filmography ==
- School for Secrets (1946) – Wives' escort officer
- Private Angelo (1949) – Simon Telfer
- Portrait of Clare (1950) – Dudley Wilburn
- His Excellency (1952) – Charles
- The Gift Horse (1952) – Lt. Michael Grant, Pilot
- Folly to Be Wise (1953) – Intellectual Corporal
- Sailor of the King (1953) – Cdr. John Stafford – HMS 'Stratford'
- The Young Lovers (1954) – Thomas Cook cashier (uncredited)
- Views on Trial (1954) – judge
- For Better, for Worse (1954) – Department Salesman
- Hell Drivers (1957) – Hawlett Assistant Manager
- Just My Luck (1957) – Steward
- The Diplomatic Corpse (1958) – Mike Billings
- Another Time, Another Place (1958) – Captain Barnes
- The Mouse on the Moon (1963) – Member of Whitehall Conference
- Catch Us If You Can (1965) – Guy
- The Spy with a Cold Nose (1966) – Man with Aston Martin
- The Whisperers (1967) – Psychiatrist
- You Only Live Twice (1967) – Foreign Secretary (uncredited)
- Danger Route (1967) – Parsons
- See No Evil (1971) – George Rexton
- Commuter Husbands (1972) – Dennis, The Husband
- The Four Feathers (1978) – Colonel Eustace
- If You Go Down in the Woods Today (1981) – Chief Constable
- Dead on Time (1983) – Intelligent Man
- Screamtime (1983) – Jack
- Jane and the Lost City (1987) – The Colonel
- The Reluctant Dragon (1987) – St George
- Number 27 (1988) – Dr. Maurice Barwick
