= Millions Like Us =

1943 film

- Theatrical release poster
- Directed by: Sidney Gilliat and Frank Launder
- Written by: Sidney Gilliat; Frank Launder
- Produced by: Edward Black
- Starring: Patricia Roc; Gordon Jackson; Anne Crawford; Eric Portman; Basil Radford; Naunton Wayne; Moore Marriott
- Cinematography: Jack Cox; Roy Fogwell
- Edited by: R. E. Dearing
- Music by: Louis Levy
- Distributed by: Gainsborough Pictures
- Release date: 5 November 1943
- Running time: 103 min
- Country: United Kingdom
- Language: English

Millions Like Us is a 1943 British propaganda film co-written and co-directed by Sidney Gilliat and Frank Launder and starring Patricia Roc, Gordon Jackson, Anne Crawford, Basil Radford, Naunton Wayne, Moore Marriott and Eric Portman. The film shows life in a wartime aircraft factory in documentary detail. According to the British Film Institute database, this film is the first in an "unofficial trilogy", along with Two Thousand Women (1944) and Waterloo Road (1945).

Radford and Wayne reprise their roles of Charters and Caldicott from The Lady Vanishes (1938) and Night Train to Munich (1941).

== Plot ==
The opening credits show huge crowds of workers going into factories. The narrator begins the film with nostalgic views of crowded beaches and remembering what it was like to eat an orange (unavailable during the war).

Celia Crowson and her family go on holiday to the south coast of England in the summer of 1939, staying in the guest house they visit every year. Soon afterwards, the Second World War breaks out and Celia's father joins what was to become the Home Guard. Her more confident sister Phyllis joins the Auxiliary Territorial Service.

Fearing her father's disapproval if she moves away from home, Celia hesitates about joining up but eventually her call-up papers arrive. Hoping to join the WAAF or one of the other services, Celia instead gets posted to a factory making aircraft components, where she meets her co-workers, including her Welsh room-mate Gwen Price and the vain upper middle-class Jennifer Knowles. Knowles dislikes the work they have to do at the factory, causing friction with their supervisor Charlie Forbes which eventually blossoms into a verbally combative romance.

The stock footage clips shown early on in the film of the "factory" where the aircraft is being made show a four engine Short Stirling bomber leaving the assembly hall and then taking off. During its real life wartime manufacture that plane would be produced at twenty various locations in the United Kingdom.

A nearby RAF bomber station sends some of its men to a staff dance at the factory, during which Celia meets and falls in love with an equally shy young Scottish flight sergeant Fred Blake. Their relationship encounters a crisis when Fred refuses to tell Celia when he is sent out on his first mission, but soon afterwards they meet and make up, with Fred asking Celia to marry him. After the wedding they spend their honeymoon at the same south coast resort as the Crowsons went to in 1939, finding it much changed with minefields and barbed wire defending against the expected German invasion.

Just after returning to the factory, they find furnished rooms nearby to set up house together but then Fred is killed in a bombing raid over Germany. Celia receives the news while working at the factory and at a mealtime shortly afterwards, the band play "Waiting at the Church", without realising it had been played at Celia's wedding reception. About to break down, Celia is comforted by her fellow workers, as bombers from Fred's squadron overfly the factory en route to another raid.

== Cast ==
- Patricia Roc as Celia Crowson/Celia Blake
- Gordon Jackson as Fred Blake
- Anne Crawford as Jennifer Knowles
- Eric Portman as Charlie Forbes
- Moore Marriott as Jim Crowson
- Basil Radford as Charters
- Naunton Wayne as Caldicott
- Joy Shelton as Phyllis Crowson
- John Boxer as Tom
- Valentine Dunn as Elsie
- Megs Jenkins as Gwen Price
- Terry Randall as Annie Earnshaw
- Amy Veness as Mrs Blythe
- John Salew as Doctor Gill
- Beatrice Varley as Miss Wells
- Bertha Willmott as the singer
- Irene Handl as landlady
- Amy Dalby as Mrs Bourne
- John Slater as Alec, man at dance hall (uncredited)

== Production ==
The film was originally intended as a documentary for the Ministry of Information but then their film division suggested it be done as a fictional movie and the project was produced at Gainsborough Studios. Screenwriters Frank Launder and Sidney Gilliat decided to share direction, both recording their debuts in that capacity. They afterwards felt that having two directors had often confused the actors. They continued to collaborate on scriptwriting and production but directed individually.

Roger Burford had suggested to the producers that they create a film covering the entire British war effort on the Home Front. The directors decided the task was too big and that the subject needed a fictional story to tie the material together. They focused on women working in an aircraft factory to show the effect of the war on ordinary people from a variety of backgrounds. The directors originally wanted to call the film The Mobile Woman. The dance hall scene involved real serving soldiers, airmen and firemen.

Gilliat later recalled:

Anne Crawford was brought in to replace Sheila Bell, a lovely girl with a sad story. Eric Portman didn't want to play in the film and went to Halifax and got drunk, but was threatened by Ted Black and ended by being co-operative with us. It was very demanding, being both writers and directors on the film, and the Ostrers thought the whole project ludicrous. Ted Black didn't get on with Maurice and Bill Ostrer, who wanted to take creative credit.

Factory scenes were filmed at Castle Bromwich Aircraft Factory, with employees serving as extras.

Beethoven's Fifth Symphony is used liberally in the soundtrack. Gilliat says "we were not responsible for the terrible assault of Beethoven.

== Reception ==
The film was a hit in the USSR.
