= John Boxer (British actor) =

British actor (1909–1982)

- Boxer playing George Fowey in the episode "A Cold Wind Blowing " in the series The Onedin Line
- Born: 25 April 1909; Hackney, London, England
- Died: 22 August 1982 (aged 73); Brighton, Sussex, England
- Occupation: Actor
- Years active: 1960–1980

John Boxer (25 April 1909 – 22 August 1982) was a British film and television actor. His television appearances included Emergency – Ward 10, Dixon of Dock Green, The Saint, Randall and Hopkirk (Deceased), The Onedin Line and The Life and Times of David Lloyd George.

== Selected filmography ==
- Escape Me Never (1935) - Undetermined Role (uncredited)
- There Ain't No Justice (1939) - Mr. Short (uncredited)
- Convoy (1940) - German Captain (uncredited)
- George and Margaret (1940) - Claude
- The Black Sheep of Whitehall (1942) - Hotel Receptionist (uncredited)
- The Big Blockade (1942) - Press
- The Day Will Dawn (1942) - U-Boat Commander
- Flying Fortress (1942) - Meteorologist (uncredited)
- The Foreman Went to France (1942) - Official (uncredited)
- The Goose Steps Out (1942) - British Pilot (uncredited)
- In Which We Serve (1942) - Hollet
- The Life and Death of Colonel Blimp (1943) - Soldier (uncredited)
- The Flemish Farm (1943) - Cyclist (uncredited)
- Millions Like Us (1943) - Tom
- The Demi-Paradise (1943) - British sailor
- San Demetrio London (1943) - Naval Officer (uncredited)
- The Halfway House (1944) - The Doctor
- Tawny Pipit (1944) - Soldier On Manoeuvre (uncredited)
- The Way Ahead (1944) - Soldier in Pub Talking to the Chelsea Pensioners (uncredited)
- Waterloo Road (1945) - Policeman in Fight in Arcade (uncredited)
- The October Man (1947) - Det. Sgt. Troth
- The White Unicorn (1947) - Bill (uncredited)
- Take My Life (1947) - Policeman Making Charge Statement (uncredited)
- My Brother's Keeper (1948) - Police Sgt. Bert Foreman
- London Belongs to Me (1948) - Prison Officer (uncredited)
- Feature Story (1949)
- The Blue Lagoon (1949) - Nick Cobbert
- It's Not Cricket (1949) - MP #1
- Man on the Run (1949) - Radio Control Officer
- Stop Press Girl (1949) - Pub Landlord (uncredited)
- Marry Me! (1949) - Policeman (uncredited)
- Don't Ever Leave Me (1949) - Policeman at Pillar Box (uncredited)
- Madeleine (1950) - Plainclothes Policeman (uncredited)
- Waterfront (1950) - Policeman (uncredited)
- The Woman in Question (1950) - Detective Lucas (uncredited)
- The Clouded Yellow (1950) - Keswick Police Sgt (uncredited)
- Highly Dangerous (1950) - Police Sergeant at Customs Cafe (uncredited)
- Mr Drake's Duck (1951) - Sergeant
- Pool of London (1951) - Detective in Pub (uncredited)
- Laughter in Paradise (1951) - Const. Charles Baker (uncredited)
- High Treason (1951) - Ships Radio Operator (uncredited)
- One Stop Shop (1953) - Bob Selby
- Street Corner (1953) - Policeman Outside Jewellers (uncredited)
- The Red Beret (1953) - Flight Sgt. Box
- Meet Mr. Lucifer (1953) - Accountant in Office (uncredited)
- Diplomatic Passport (1954) - Policeman (uncredited)
- The Ship That Died of Shame (1955) - Customes Man (uncredited)
- Secret Venture (1955) - Inspector Dalton
- Brothers in Law (1957) - Mr. Johnson
- The Tommy Steele Story (1957) - Paul Lincoln
- The Bridge on the River Kwai (1957) - Major Hughes
- Undercover Girl (1958) - Ken Farrell, the Editor
- Heart of a Child (1958) - Breuer
- Violent Moment (1959) - Det. Sgt. Jarman (uncredited)
- Not a Hope in Hell (1960) - Merriman
- Victim (1961) - Policeman in Cell (uncredited)
- Emergency (1962) - Prison Governor
- Heavens Above! (1963) - Stockbroker (uncredited)
- Hide and Seek (1964) - Secretary at Ministry
- For the Love of Ada (1972) - Vicar
- Frenzy (1972) - Sir George
- Gandhi (1982) - Court Reporter #2 (final film role)
