= Charters and Caldicott (TV series) =

1985 British TV series

- Written by: Keith Waterhouse
- Directed by: Julian Amyes
- Starring: Robin Bailey; Michael Aldridge; Caroline Blakiston; Gerard Murphy; Tessa Peake-Jones
- Country of origin: United Kingdom
- Original language: English
- No. of series: 1
- No. of episodes: 6

Production
- Producer: Ron Craddock
- Running time: 50 Minutes

Original release
- Network: BBC One
- Release: 10 January – 14 February 1985

Charters and Caldicott is a 1985 BBC mystery series featuring the characters Charters and Caldicott from the Hitchcock film The Lady Vanishes updated to a 1980s setting. It comprised six 50-minute episodes broadcast on BBC1 at 9:25 pm on Thursdays from 10 January to 14 February 1985.

== Plot ==
The story shows the character pair in their retirement. Caldicott lives in the splendid Viceroy Court in Marylebone, whilst Charters is a widower living in a country cottage near Reigate, travelling up to his Pall Mall club on a Green Line bus (hailing it on the street as if it were a taxi). When a young girl is found murdered in Caldicott's flat, Charters and Caldicott forsake their regular Friday lunch and cinema visit to involve themselves in solving the crime, with the assistance of Margaret Mottram, a divorcee friend of Caldicott. As more deaths follow they continue to cross fastidious Inspector Snow and their shadowy club-member Venebles. Inevitably, the plot involves the game of cricket, with the two finding coded messages in a letter that purports to correct errors in the description of a game in the Wisden Cricketers' Almanack, the official Bible of first-class cricket, but which may lead to a sunken gold treasure.

== Cast ==
- Robin Bailey – Charters
- Michael Aldridge – Caldicott
- Granville Saxton – Gregory
- Caroline Blakiston – Margaret Mottram
- Patrick Carter – Grimes
- Tessa Peake-Jones – Jenny
- Gerard Murphy – Inspector Snow
- Philip Stone – Venables

== Crew ==
- Keith Waterhouse – Writer
- Julian Amyes – Director
- Ron Craddock – Producer
