= Highly Dangerous =

1950 British film by Roy Ward Baker

- Directed by: Roy Ward Baker (as Roy Baker)
- Written by: Eric Ambler
- Produced by: Antony Darnborough executive Earl St. John
- Starring: Margaret Lockwood; Dane Clark; Marius Goring; Naunton Wayne
- Cinematography: Reginald H. Wyer
- Edited by: Alfred Roome
- Music by: Richard Addinsell
- Production company: Two Cities Films
- Distributed by: General Film Distributors (UK); Lippert Pictures (US)
- Release dates: 6 December 1950 (London); 12 October 1951 (US)
- Running time: 88-90 minutes
- Country: United Kingdom
- Language: English

Highly Dangerous (U.S. title: Time Running Out) is a 1950 British spy film directed by Roy Ward Baker and starring Margaret Lockwood and Dane Clark. It was written by Eric Ambler based on his 1936 novel The Dark Frontier. It was released in the USA by Lippert Pictures.

== Plot ==
British intelligence man Hedgerley persuades entomologist Frances Gray - who loves radio action stories about spy Frank Conway - to investigate reports of disease-resistant insects being bred in eastern Europe as bio-weapons. Arriving there as "Frances Conway", she shares a train compartment with police chief Razinski, who finds the microscope she's smuggling in. She's contacted by agent Alf and meets American reporter Bill Casey, who's desperate for a good story. But Alf is killed and his body left in her hotel room. Frances is interrogated with a truth drug, which only makes her think she's Frank Conway. British consul Luke has her freed and she's given 24 hours to leave the country. But, still drugged, she enlists a reluctant Bill, drugs the cop tailing her, drives to the insect lab in the woods, starts a fire to distract the police, and takes several insects. Pursued by guards she comes round woozily. With the help of a priest, Bill helps her hide and they take a train out of the country disguised as gypsies - but have to tangle with British customs staff when they land.

== Cast ==
- Margaret Lockwood as Frances Gray
- Dane Clark as Bill Casey
- Marius Goring as Commandant Anton Razinski
- Naunton Wayne as Mr Hedgerley
- Wilfrid Hyde-White as Mr Luke (as Wilfrid Hyde White)
- Eugene Deckers as Alf
- Olaf Pooley as Detective-Interrogator
- Gladys Henson as attendant
- Paul Hardtmuth as priest
- Michael Hordern as lab director Owens
- George Benson as sandwich stand customer
- Eric Pohlmann as Joe
- Joan Haythorne as Judy
- Patric Doonan as customs man
- Anthony Newley as operator
- Anton Diffring as officer at station Checkpoint (uncredited)

== Production ==
Margaret Lockwood had not made a film in 18 months following Madness of the Heart, and had been focusing on stage work. Earl St John wanted a comeback vehicle and commissioned Eric Ambler to write a film specifically as a vehicle for Lockwood. Ambler had recently specialised in melodramas, but Highly Dangerous was a comedy thriller in the vein of Lockwood's earlier hits, The Lady Vanishes and Night Train to Munich. It was directed by Roy Ward Baker, who had served with Ambler during the war.

"One thing about Eric is that he presents you with a script that is beautifully finished in every detail", said Baker. He added " Eric had invented a language for the people the other side of the curtain which wasn’t Russian or anything else and the poor actors had to learn this stuff. He was playing a game with that."

"I think Margaret Lockwood wanted to play a modern woman", recalled Baker. "It was actually Eric Ambler's first or second book, although the book had a different title and its main character was a man; Eric changed it to a woman to make it more interesting".

The studio wanted a Hollywood leading man to play opposite Lockwood. Wendell Corey was originally sought before the role was given to Dane Clark, who had recently left Warner Bros. "He was just delivering a stock leading man movie performance, which was virtually nothing," said Baker. "He wasn’t very efficient. I think he fell in love with London. He also fell deeply in love with Jean Simmons, which was unrequited. He was a pillock, I’m afraid. Marius Goring played the Belgravian heavy; he was very heavy, I'm afraid. I couldn't control him at all. It was a satisfactory run of the mill picture."

There was location work done in Trieste. "I found it very difficult to make anything of that location," said Baker. "I was a bit disappointed and to tell the truth I didn't do it very well. The reason I say that is that many years later... I realised I’d been trying to piece it together in a logical way, sticking to the topography of Trieste. I’d done myself an injury because the audience doesn't give a damn."

Filming started at Pinewood Studios in June 1950.

Baker later said that "Highly Dangerous wasn't a very successful picture.... It was a good idea although I don't think I did it very well."

== Reception ==
The Monthly Film Bulletin wrote: "Eric Ambler's script is a curious mixture of genuine adventure, and of comedy based on the recurrence of the Dick Barton theme. The adventures, unfortunately, follow an all too conventional pattern, and the comedy-burlesque only adds to their artificiality. It is particularly disappointing that a writer such as Eric Ambler should be involved in so undistinguished a thriller. Of the players, only Dane Clark succeeds in overcoming the obstacles of the script: Margaret Lockwood is as usual."

Kine Weekly wrote: "The romp behind the Iron Curtain, perfectly handled by Margaret Lockwood and Dane Clark, leads to a box-office alternation of chuckles and chills. Grand fun, colourfully presented, it's certain to find favour with young and old alike."

Variety wrote: "Miss Lockwood gives a smooth portrayal but fails to register adequate terror when given the third degree. Clark does well as the easy-going reporter. Marius Goring is a natural as police chief, while Naunton Wayne is a stern official of the Imperial General Staff. Wilfred Hyde-White contributes amother fine characterization as the British Charge D'Affaires, Roy Baker has directed with technical skill while lensing is sensitive."

Film4 wrote: "An enjoyably silly British take on germ warfare and Cold War espionage."

== Notes ==
- McFarlane, Brian, An Autobiography of British Cinema, 1997
