= Dead of Night =

- U.S. theatrical release poster
- Directed by: Alberto Cavalcanti (Note: Segments: "The Christmas Party"; "The Ventriloquist's Dummy"); Charles Crichton (Note: Segment: "The Golfer's Story"); Robert Hamer (Note: Segment: "The Haunted Mirror"); Basil Dearden (Note: Segments: Overarching story; "The Hearse Driver")
- Story by: John Baines (Note: Segments: "The Haunted Mirror"; "The Ventriloquist's Dummy"); Angus MacPhail (Note: Segment: "The Christmas Party")
- Based on: Stories by H. G. Wells, John Baines, E. F. Benson, Angus MacPhail
- Produced by: Michael Balcon
- Starring: Michael Redgrave; Mervyn Johns; Frederick Valk; Roland Culver
- Cinematography: Douglas Slocombe; Jack Parker
- Edited by: Charles Hasse
- Music by: Georges Auric
- Production company: Ealing Studios
- Distributed by: Eagle-Lion Films (UK); Universal Pictures (US)
- Release date: 9 September 1945 (London)
- Running time: 103 minutes
- Country: United Kingdom
- Language: English

Dead of Night is a 1945 British supernatural horror anthology film directed by Alberto Cavalcanti, Charles Crichton, Basil Dearden, and Robert Hamer. It stars Mervyn Johns, Googie Withers, Sally Ann Howes, and Michael Redgrave. Produced by Ealing Studios, the film features five segments within a frame narrative in which a group of guests assembled at a country manor recount stories of their own encounters with the supernatural. It is best remembered for the concluding story featuring Redgrave as an insane ventriloquist with a malevolent dummy.

Eagle-Lion Films released Dead of Night theatrically in the United Kingdom on 9 September 1945. Dead of Night is one of the few horror films made in England during the 1940s, as horror films had been banned from production in Britain during World War II. It was also one of the few horror efforts from Ealing Studios, who were primarily known for producing comedies. The film was greatly influential on the horror and anthology film genres, and is regarded by film critics and scholars as a classic.

== Plot ==
Walter Craig arrives at a country cottage in Kent, where he is greeted by his host Elliot Foley. Craig is an architect whom Foley has invited to his home to consult on some renovations. Upon entering the sitting room of the cottage, Craig tells Foley and his assembled guests that, despite never having met any of them, he has seen them all in a recurring dream.

Craig appears to have no prior personal knowledge of them but is able to predict events in the house before they unfold. Craig partially recalls that something awful will later occur. Dr. van Straaten, a psychiatrist, tries to persuade Craig that his fears are unfounded. The other guests attempt to test Craig's foresight and entertain each other with tales of strange events they experienced or were told about.

Racing car driver Hugh Grainger recalls lying in hospital after an accident. One night, the peripheral noises of the ward cease and the time on his bedside clock changes. He opens the curtains to see that it is daytime, and a horse-drawn hearse is parked outside. The hearse driver calls up, "just room for one inside, sir". After being discharged from the hospital, Grainger waits for a bus. The bus conductor, who exactly resembles the hearse driver, tells him, "just room for one inside, sir". Grainger does not board the bus. As it drives away, the bus swerves and plunges down an embankment.

Sally O'Hara remembers attending a Christmas party at a mansion. During a game of hide-and-seek, Sally hides behind a curtain and is found by Jimmy, who tells her of a murder that once happened in the mansion. She finds a door which leads to a nursery, where she hears a young boy, Francis Kent, weeping. She consoles him and tucks him into bed. When she returns to the main room, she is told Francis Kent was murdered by his sister Constance.

Joan Cortland tells of an incident in which she gave her husband Peter a mirror for his birthday one year. Upon looking into it, he sees himself in a room other than his own. Joan learns that the mirror's previous owner, Francis Etherington, killed his wife on a suspicion of adultery, before slitting his own throat in front of the mirror. Peter, too, accuses Joan of being unfaithful and attempts to strangle her, but she breaks the mirror, returning Peter to his normal mental state.

Foley recounts two golfers, George Parratt and Larry Potter, who both fell in love with a woman named Mary Lee. They decide to play a round of golf for Mary's hand in marriage. Parratt wins by cheating, and Potter drowns himself in a nearby lake. When he next plays golf, Parratt is interrupted by Potter's ghost. Potter demands he give up Mary or else he will continue to haunt him, but finds he has forgotten how to vanish. On the night of Parratt and Mary's wedding, Parratt unwittingly causes himself to vanish, leaving Potter the opportunity to charm Mary.

Dr. van Straaten recollects interviewing ventriloquist Maxwell Frere, who performed with a dummy named Hugo. Upon meeting American ventriloquist Sylvester Kee, Hugo continually speaks about abandoning Frere and working with Kee instead. Frere attempts to silence Hugo, but Hugo bites his hand, drawing blood. Some time later at a hotel bar, Hugo insults a woman, and Frere is blamed. Kee brings Frere and Hugo to Frere's hotel room, placing Hugo on Frere's bed. The next morning, Frere accuses Kee of stealing Hugo, and finds Hugo in Kee's room. He shoots Kee (though not fatally) and is arrested. Van Straaten arranges for Hugo to be brought to Frere's cell, where they have an argument that ends in Frere suffocating and smashing Hugo. Later, in an asylum, Frere speaks with Hugo's voice.

In the country home, Craig strangles Dr. van Straaten. Craig then hallucinates about the stories told by the other guests, before awakening in his bedroom as a phone rings. He receives a call from Elliot Foley, inviting him to his country home to consult on some renovations. Craig's wife suggests that spending a weekend in the country might help him get rid of his nightmares. Craig then drives down to Foley's cottage in Kent as in the start of the film.

== Cast ==
=== Overarching story at farmhouse ===
- Anthony Baird (credited as Antony Baird) as Hugh Grainger
- Roland Culver as Eliot Foley
- Renée Gadd as Mrs. Craig
- Sally Ann Howes as Sally O'Hara the teenager
- Mervyn Johns as Walter Craig
- Judy Kelly as Joyce Grainger
- Barbara Leake as Mrs. O'Hara
- Mary Merrall as Mrs. Foley
- Frederick Valk as Dr. van Straaten
- Googie Withers as Joan Cortland

=== The Hearse Driver ===
- Anthony Baird as Hugh Grainger
- Judy Kelly as Joyce Grainger
- Miles Malleson as the hearse driver/bus conductor
- Robert Wyndham as Dr. Albury

=== The Christmas Party ===
- Michael Allan as Jimmy Watson
- Sally Ann Howes as Sally O'Hara
- Barbara Leake as Mrs. O'Hara
- Uncredited actor as Francis Kent, the ghost

=== The Haunted Mirror ===
- Ralph Michael as Peter Cortland
- Esmé Percy as Mr. Rutherford the antiques dealer
- Googie Withers as Joan Cortland

=== The Golfer's Story ===
- Peggy Bryan as Mary Lee
- Basil Radford as George Parratt
- Naunton Wayne as Larry Potter
- Peter Jones as Fred the barman (uncredited)

=== The Ventriloquist's Dummy ===
- Allan Jeayes as Maurice Olcott
- Magda Kun as Mitzi
- Miles Malleson as the jailer
- Garry Marsh as Harry Parker
- Hartley Power as Sylvester Kee
- Michael Redgrave as Maxwell Frere
- Frederick Valk as Dr. van Straaten
- Elisabeth Welch as Beulah

== Production ==
=== Development ===
"The Hearse Driver" is based on the short story "The Bus-Conductor" by E. F. Benson, which was originally published in The Pall Mall Magazine in 1906.

"The Christmas Party" is based on the 1860 murder of Francis Saville Kent, for which his half-sister Constance Kent was convicted in 1865.

"The Golfer's Story" is based on the short story "The Story of the Inexperienced Ghost" by H. G. Wells. The characters of Parratt and Potter, as portrayed by Basil Radford and Naunton Wayne in the segment, are derivative of the characters Charters and Caldicott from Alfred Hitchcock's The Lady Vanishes (1938). The double-act proved to be popular enough for Radford and Wayne to be paired up as similar sport-obsessed English gentlemen (or occasionally reprising their original roles) in a number of productions, including this one.

== Release ==
The film opened at the Gaumont Haymarket cinema in London on 9 September 1945.

Universal Pictures distributed the film theatrically in the United States in a truncated cut that excised two segments: "The Christmas Party" and "The Golfer's Story", which resulted in the final product suffering continuity errors.

=== Home media ===
Anchor Bay Entertainment released the film on DVD in 2003 in a double feature paired with The Queen of Spades (1949). In 2014, StudioCanal released the film on Blu-ray as part of their Vintage Classics series. Kino Lorber released a Blu-ray edition of the film in North America, licensed by StudioCanal, on 9 July 2019, featuring a new 4K restoration from the original film elements.

== Reception ==
=== Box office ===
According to Kinematograph Weekly the film performed well at the British box office in 1945. The 'biggest winner' at the box office in 1945 Britain was The Seventh Veil, with "runners up" being (in release order), Madonna of the Seven Moons, Old Acquaintance, Frenchman's Creek, Mrs. Parkington, Arsenic and Old Lace, Meet Me in St. Louis, A Song to Remember, Since You Went Away, Here Come the Waves, Tonight and Every Night, Hollywood Canteen, They Were Sisters, The Princess and the Pirate, The Adventures of Susan, National Velvet, Mrs. Skefflngton, I Live in Grosvenor Square, Nob Hill, Perfect Strangers, The Valley of Decision, Conflict and Duffy's Tavern. British "runners-up" were They Were Sisters, I Live in Grosvenor Square, Perfect Strangers, Madonna of the Seven Moons, Waterloo Road, Blithe Spirit, The Way to the Stars, I'll Be Your Sweetheart, Dead of Night, Waltz Time and Henry V.

=== Critical response ===
From a contemporary review, the Monthly Film Bulletin praised the tale of the ventriloquist, stating that it was "perhaps the best" and that it was perhaps Cavalcanti's "most polished work for many years". The review praised Basil Radford and Naunton Wayne for "providing excellent comic relief", and concluded that the art direction (Michael Relph), lighting (Stan Pavey and Douglas Slocombe) and editing (Charles Hassey) combine to make the smoothest film yet to come from an English studio". In The Nation in 1946, critic James Agee wrote, " ... Dead of Night is in every way made with exceptional skill and wit; as intelligent light entertainment it could not be better; and its famous last shot, whether one has foreseen it or not, is one of the most successful blends of laughter, terror, and outrage that I can remember." British critic Leslie Halliwell gave it four of four stars, stating, "Chillingly successful and influential compendium of the macabre, especially effective in its low-key handling of the linking sequence with its circular ending."

Pauline Kael lauded the film, "Michael Redgrave plays a schizophrenic ventriloquist tormented by his dummy, and his overpowering performance—a small work of art—lifts this five-part English production above the elegant, sophisticated entertainment it aspired to be. The individual stories are meant to accumulate in intensity, until the trap closes in the surreal climax—an encompassing ghost story." Kael mentioned that when attending a screening of the film in the mid-1940s, the audience laughed during the most terrifying moments. She believed the "tension had got to too much for them...turning philistine, rejecting their own emotional immersion."

Film critic Leonard Maltin awarded the film 4 out of a possible 4 stars.

Review aggregator website Rotten Tomatoes reports an approval rating of 96% based on 48 reviews. The site's critical consensus reads, "With four accomplished directors contributing, Dead of Night is a classic horror anthology that remains highly influential."

== Legacy ==
Dead of Night has widely been regarded as a classic film and one of the greatest horror films of all time, as well as significantly influential on the anthology film genre. In the early 2010s, Time Out conducted a poll with several authors, directors, actors and critics who have worked within the horror genre to vote for their top horror films. Dead of Night placed at number 35 on their top 100 list. Director Martin Scorsese placed Dead of Night 5th on his list of the 11 scariest horror films of all time. Writer-director Christopher Smith was inspired by the circular narrative in Dead of Night when making his 2009 film Triangle.

The circular plot of Dead of Night inspired Fred Hoyle's steady state model of the universe, developed in 1948. After Hoyle, Hermann Bondi, and Thomas Gold viewed the film, Gold speculated, "What if the universe is like that?", referring its circular plot. Hoyle initially rejected the idea, saying, "we will dispose of this before dinner", but as the three astrophysicists discussed it further, they found it difficult to dismiss. Bondi later wrote "Dinner was a little late that night, and before long we all said that this was a very possible solution."

A shot of Redgrave from the film is featured on the front cover of Secret Dreams: A Biography of Michael Redgrave (2004) by Alan Strachan (1944-2025) and of Merrie Land (2018), an album by The Good, the Bad & the Queen.

== See also ==
- List of cult films
- List of ghost films

== Sources ==
- Burton, Alan; Chibnall, Steve (2013). Historical Dictionary of British Cinema. Lanham, Maryland: Scarecrow Press. ISBN 978-0-810-88026-9.
- Cook, Pam, ed. (2019). The Cinema Book (Third ed.). London, England: Bloomsbury Publishing. ISBN 978-1-838-71869-5.
- Gregory, Jane (2005). Fred Hoyle's Universe. Oxford, Oxfordshire: Oxford University Press. ISBN 978-0-191-57846-5.
- Lant, Antonia (1991). Blackout: Reinventing Women for Wartime British Cinema. Princeton, New Jersey: Princeton University Press. ISBN 978-0-691-00828-8.
- Livio, Mario (2014). Brilliant Blunders: From Darwin to Einstein - Colossal Mistakes by Great Scientists That Changed Our Understanding of Life and the Universe. New York City, New York: Simon and Schuster. ISBN 978-1-4391-9237-5.
- Markusen, Bruce (2021). Hosted Horror on Television: The Films and Faces of Shock Theater, Creature Features and Chiller Theater. Jefferson, North Carolina: McFarland. ISBN 978-1-476-64328-1.
- Maltin, Leonard (2015). Turner Classic Movies Presents Leonard Maltin's Classic Movie Guide: From the Silent Era Through 1965: Third Edition. New York City, New York: Penguin Publishing Group. ISBN 978-0-698-19729-9.
- Murphy, Robert (2003). Realism and Tinsel: Cinema and Society in Britain 1939-48. London, England: Routledge. ISBN 978-1-134-90150-0.
- Pirie, David (2024). A New Heritage of Horror: The English Gothic Cinema. London, England: Bloomsbury Publishing. ISBN 978-1-350-30381-2.
- Waldrop, M. Mitchell (2022). Cosmic Origins: Science's Long Quest to Understand How Our Universe Began. Cham, Switzerland: Springer Nature. ISBN 978-3-030-98214-0.

Further reading

- Jerry Vermilye, The Great British Films, 1978, Citadel Press, pp. 85–87, ISBN 0-8065-0661-X
- Jez Conolly and David Owain Bates, "Devil's Advocates: Dead of Night", 2015, Auteur, ISBN 978-0993238437
