= John Aldridge (physician) =

John Frederick Lewis Aldridge OBE (28 December 1926 – 29 September 2023) was an English physician and consultant in occupational medicine. He was Dean of the Faculty of Occupational Medicine and Civilian Consultant in Occupational Medicine to the Royal Navy.

== Early life ==
Born in Watford, Hertfordshire, the son of Frederick James Aldridge and Kathleen Marietta Micaela White, Aldridge was educated at Gresham's School and the St Thomas's Hospital Medical School, graduating MB, BS in 1951.

He was a younger brother of the actor Michael Aldridge.

== Career ==
After house jobs in Eastbourne and Portsmouth, Aldridge was commissioned into the Royal Army Medical Corps. From 1956 to 1959 he was a medical specialist in the British Military Hospital, Tripoli. Returning to civilian life, he joined the Reed Paper Group as Industrial Medical Officer. From 1963 to 1987, he was Chief Medical Officer of IBM UK Ltd. He was Civil Consultant in Occupational Medicine to the Royal Navy, 1983–1992.

As well as serving as Dean of the Faculty of Occupational Medicine, Aldridge was an active member of the Royal Society of Medicine, the British Medical Association, the British Occupational Hygiene Society, the Royal Society of Tropical Medicine and Hygiene, the Society of Occupational Medicine, and the Internal Association of Physicians for Overseas Services.

== Honours ==
- Officer of the Order of the British Empire, 1990
- Fellow of the Royal College of Physicians, 1984
- Fellow of the Royal College of Physicians of Edinburgh, 1980
- Fellow of Faculty of Occupational Medicine

== Personal life ==
In Kensington, in 1955, Aldridge married Barbara Sheila Bolland, and they had three sons and one daughter.

He died on 29 September 2023.
