= Basil Radford =

English actor (1897–1952)

- Basil Radford (left) and Naunton Wayne
- Born: Arthur Basil Radford; 25 June 1897; Chester, England
- Died: 20 October 1952 (aged 55); Westminster, London, England
- Occupation: Actor
- Years active: 1929–1952
- Spouse: Shirley Deuchars (m. 1926)
- Children: 1

Arthur Basil Radford (25 June 1897 – 20 October 1952) was an English character actor who featured in many British films of the 1930s and 1940s.

He trained at the Royal Academy of Dramatic Art and made his first stage appearance in July 1924. He is probably best remembered for his appearances alongside Naunton Wayne as two cricket-obsessed Englishmen in several films from 1938 to 1949.

== Early life ==
Radford was born in Chester, England, on 25 June 1897.

== First World War ==
He was a commissioned officer in the South Staffordshire Regiment in the First World War, in 1918 transferring into the Royal Air Force, ending the war as a subaltern when he was demobilised in 1920. Radford had a crescent-shaped scar on his right cheek from a wound sustained during his time in the trenches. Depending on the lighting and camera angle it varied from barely perceptible to prominent.

== Film career ==
Radford first appeared with Naunton Wayne as their characters Charters and Caldicott in Alfred Hitchcock's 1938 thriller The Lady Vanishes. They were popular enough to reprise their roles in Night Train to Munich, which was again scripted by Frank Launder and Sidney Gilliat.

They appeared together in several other 1940s films, including Crook's Tour (1941), The Next of Kin (1942), Millions Like Us (1943), Dead of Night (1945), Quartet (1948), It's Not Cricket (1949), Stop Press Girl (1949), and Passport to Pimlico (1949).

Apart from his long-running partnership with Naunton Wayne, Radford made many other memorable film appearances in character roles. His other films included Young and Innocent (1937), Jamaica Inn (1939) (both also for Hitchcock), The Way to the Stars (1945), The Captive Heart (1946), The Winslow Boy (1948) and Whisky Galore! (1949).

== Personal life ==
In 1926, he married Shirley Deuchars. They had one son.

== Death ==
Radford's health began seriously to fail in the summer of 1951, forcing him to take a long break from acting. He died at St George's Hospital, Westminster, London, on 20 October 1952, from liver failure due to cirrhosis of the liver.

== Complete filmography ==
- Barnum Was Right (1929) as Standish
- Woman to Woman (1929) as Officer in Street (uncredited)
- Seven Days Leave (1930) as Corporal
- There Goes the Bride (1932) as Rudolph (uncredited)
- Leave It to Smith (1933) as Sir John Moynton
- A Southern Maid (1934) as Tom
- Foreign Affaires (1935) as Basil Mallory
- Broken Blossoms (1936) as Mr. Reed
- Dishonour Bright (1936) as Henry Crane
- Jump for Glory (1937) as Defending Counsel
- Young and Innocent (1937) as Erica's Uncle
- Captain's Orders (1937) as Murdoch
- Convict 99 (1938) as Deputy Governor
- The Lady Vanishes (1938) as Charters
- Climbing High (1938) as Reggie
- The Royal Family of Broadway (1939) as Gilbert Marshall (TV Movie)
- Let's Be Famous (1939) as Watson
- Trouble Brewing (1939) as Guest at Madame Berdi's (uncredited)
- Shall We Join the Ladies? (1939) as Mr. Preen (TV Movie)
- Jamaica Inn (1939) as Lord George
- Secret Journey (1939) as Reggie
- The Four Just Men (1939) (uncredited)
- The Girl Who Forgot (1940) as Mr. Barradine
- She Couldn't Say No (1940) as Lord Pilton
- Spies of the Air (1940) as Bill Madison
- Just William (1940) as Mr. Sidway
- The Girl in the News (1940) as Dr. Threadgrove
- Night Train to Munich (1940) as Charters
- The Flying Squad (1940) as Sederman
- Room for Two (1940) as Robert Spencer
- Crook's Tour (1941) as Charters
- Save Rubber (1942) (government Information film short)
- Flying Fortress (1942) as Captain Wilkinson
- The Next of Kin (1942, cameo, with Naunton Wayne) as Careless talker on train (last scene)
- Unpublished Story (1942) as Lamb
- London Scrapbook (1942) as Himself
- Dear Octopus (1943) as Kenneth
- Millions Like Us (1943) as Charters
- Twilight Hour (1945) as Lord Chetwood
- The Way to the Stars (1945) as Tiny Williams
- Dead of Night (1945) as George Parratt
- The Captive Heart (1946) as Major Ossy Dalrymple
- A Girl in a Million (1946) as Prendergast
- The Winslow Boy (1948) as Desmond Curry
- Quartet (1948) as Henry Garnet (segment "The Facts of Life")
- It's Not Cricket (1949) as Major Bright
- Passport to Pimlico (1949) as Gregg
- Stop Press Girl (1949) as The Mechanical Type
- Whisky Galore! (1949) as Captain Paul Waggett
- Helter Skelter (1949) as Maj. Bright (uncredited)
- Chance of a Lifetime (1950) as Dickinson
- Ha'penny Breeze (1950) as Shopkeeper (uncredited)
- The Galloping Major (1951) as Major Arthur Hill (also based on a story written by Radford)
- White Corridors (1951) as Retired Civil Servant (final film role)

* Charters and Caldicott films

== Selected stage appearances ==
- Night Must Fall by Emlyn Williams (1935)
- Someone at the Door by Campbell Christie (1935)
- Blondie White by Bernard Merivale and Jeffrey Dell (1937)
- The Innocent Party by H.M. Harwood (1938)
- Warn That Man! by Vernon Sylvaine (1941)
- She Follows Me About by Ben Travers (1943)
- The Blind Goddess by Patrick Hastings (1947)
- A Penny for a Song by John Whiting (1951)
