= Naunton Wayne =

Welsh actor (1901–1970)

- Wayne in The Lady Vanishes, 1938
- Born: Henry Wayne Davies; 22 June 1901; Pontypridd, Glamorgan, Wales
- Died: 17 November 1970 (aged 69); Tolworth, Greater London, England
- Years active: 1932–1969

Naunton Wayne (born Henry Wayne Davies; 22 June 1901 – 17 November 1970), was a Welsh character actor, born in Pontypridd, Glamorgan, Wales. He was educated at Clifton College. His name was changed by deed poll in 1933.

== Stage actor ==
His first London stage roles were in Streamline at the Palace in 1934, and in 1066 and All That at the Strand in 1935 (where he provided comic continuity for other performers). His first full role was as Norman Weldon in Wise Tomorrow at the Lyric Theatre in 1937. He played Mortimer Brewster in Arsenic and Old Lace at the Strand for four years. He was a leading member of The Stage Golfing Society.

In 1949, he starred in Young Wives' Tale, at the Savoy Theatre.

From November 1956 he appeared in the long-running farce The Bride and the Bachelor at the Duchess Theatre.

== Film actor ==
He became best known for his role as a supporting character, Caldicott, in the 1938 film version of The Lady Vanishes, a role he repeated in three further films, alongside Basil Radford as his equally cricket-obsessed friend, Charters. The two would go on to appear in other films together, often playing similar characters. Their other joint credits include Night Train to Munich (1940), Crook's Tour (1941), Millions Like Us (1943), Dead of Night (1945), Quartet (1948), It's Not Cricket (1949), and Passport to Pimlico (1949).

Wayne also appeared alone in other films, including the Ealing comedy The Titfield Thunderbolt (1953) and Obsession (1949).

== Personal life ==
Wayne married Gladys Dove, a concert pianist, in 1927, and they had two sons, Peter and John.

== Death ==
Wayne died in Tolworth, Surrey, on 17 November 1970, at the age of 69.

== Filmography ==
- The First Mrs. Fraser (1932) as Compere
- Going Gay (1933) as Jim
- For Love of You (1933) as Jim
- Something Always Happens (1934) as Man Refusing to Help Peter (uncredited)
- The Lady Vanishes (1938) as Caldicott
- A Girl Must Live (1939) as Hugo Smythe
- Night Train to Munich (1940) as Caldicott
- Crook's Tour (1941) as Caldicott
- The Next of Kin (1942) as Careless talker on train (last scene)
- Millions Like Us (1943) as Caldicott
- Dead of Night (1945) as Larry Potter
- A Girl in a Million (1946) as Fotheringham
- Quartet (1948) as Leslie (segment "The Facts of Life")
- It's Not Cricket (1949) as Capt. Early
- Passport to Pimlico (1949) as Straker
- Stop Press Girl (1949) as The Mechanical Type
- Helter Skelter (1949) as Capt. Early (uncredited)
- Obsession (1949) as Supt. Finsbury
- Double Confession (1950) as Inspector Tenby
- Trio (1950) as Mr. Ramsey (in segment Mr. Know-All)
- Highly Dangerous (1950) as Mr. Hedgerley
- Circle of Danger (1951) as Reggie Sinclair
- The Happy Family (1952) as Mr. Filch
- The Tall Headlines (1952) as Police Inspector
- Treasure Hunt (1952) as Eustace Mills
- The Titfield Thunderbolt (1953) as Blakeworth
- You Know What Sailors Are (1954) as Captain Owbridge
- Operation Bullshine (1959) as Major Pym
- Double Bunk (1961) as 1st Thames Conservancy Officer
- Nothing Barred (1961) as Lord Whitebait
