= Crook's Tour =

1940 British film by John Baxter

- Directed by: John Baxter
- Written by: Barbara K. Emary; Max Kester; John Watt
- Based on: radio serial
- Produced by: John Corfield
- Starring: Basil Radford; Naunton Wayne; Greta Gynt; Abraham Sofaer; Charles Oliver
- Cinematography: James Wilson
- Edited by: Michael C. Chorlton
- Music by: Kennedy Russell
- Production company: British National Films
- Distributed by: Anglo-American Films
- Release date: 3 September 1940
- Running time: 80 minutes
- Country: United Kingdom
- Language: English

Crook's Tour is a 1940 British comedy spy film directed by John Baxter featuring Charters and Caldicott. It was written by Barbara K. Emary, Max Kester and John Watt, adapted from the 1940 BBC radio serial of the same name.

== Plot ==
Charters and Caldicott are touring the Middle East (Saudi Arabia) with fellow Britons. After their vehicle breaks down they meet a caravan and a local sheikh invites them to dinner. After a glass of wine the sheikh offers to lend them two camels and tells of his fears that someone is spying on his oilfield.

They return to Baghdad where they go to a night club. Here two spies are expected and a Mata Hari type figure (the glamorous La Palermo) delivers a note (hidden on a record) to them in error, because they order exactly what the true spies are meant to order (as a code). When the real spies arrive (two Americans) and make the same order the mistake is realised.

Meanwhile, our two heroes are flying to Istanbul. Here they are directed to a false hotel. La Palermo is to sing there to let them know something is up. They plan to kill the pair. They put them in a room with a booby trap bathroom... just a large hole dropping into the Bosporus. Charters slaps someone on the back, believing it to be Caldicott, and he falls in. Fearing reprisal for this accidental death they catch a plane to Budapest. Charters' sister Edith arrives in Budapest and struggles to track their hotel. La Palermo breaks into Caldicott's room to try to find the record. The next evening they track down La Palermo singing in a local night club, singing "Gypsy Lover".

The pair give the record to an English contact but are astounded when he says he does not play cricket.

They take a train eastwards to the edge of Hungary. They climb to a hilltop castle where La Palermo is. They are caught and are shot by firing squad, but La Palermo has organised blanks in the guns and they all escape together. A driver rushes all three to an airport then they take a boat across the Adriatic before going back to London. La Palermo kisses Caldicott as their train approaches London.

== Cast ==
- Basil Radford as Charters
- Naunton Wayne as Caldicott
- Greta Gynt as La Palermo
- Charles Oliver as Sheik
- Gordon McLeod as Rossenger
- Abraham Sofaer as Ali
- Bernard Rebel as Klacken
- Cyril Gardiner as K.7.
- Leo de Pokorny as hotel manager
- Morris Harvey as waiter
- Noel Hood as Edith Charters
- Finlay Currie as tourist (uncredited)
- Andreas Malandrinos as nightclub manager (uncredited)
- Patricia Medina as hotel receptionist (uncredited)
- Jack Melford as tour guide (uncredited)

== Radio serial ==
Crook's Tour
- Genre: serial
- Running time: 30 mins (6:30 pm – 7:00 pm)
- Country of origin: United Kingdom
- Language: English
- Starring: Basil Radford; Naunton Wayne
- Written by: Frank Launder; Sidney Gilliat; John Watt; Matt Kester
- Directed by: Vernon Harris
- Original release: 23 February – 28 March 1940
- No. of series: 1
- No. of episodes: 6

The original radio serial also starred Basil Radford and Naunton Wayne as Charters and Cauldicott, and was written by Frank Launder and Sidney Gilliat.

=== Episodes ===
- Part 1 – "All Abroad"
- Part 2 – "Thud and Blunder"
- Part 3 – "Crime Marches On"
- Part 5 – "High Spy"
- Part 6 – "How's that, Empire?"

== Production ==
In May 1940 it was announced John Corfeld of British National had enjoyed the serial and wanted to turn it into a film. Filming took place at Elstree Studios.

== Reception ==
Kine Weekly wrote: "Crazy espionage burlesque with songs, describing the adventures and misadventures of a couple of English innocents abroad. There is keen teamwork on the part of those inimitable and popular 'old school tie' comedians Basil Radford and Naunton Wayne, but laughable as they are, the treatment is quietly humorous in its satire rather than uproarious or exciting. The story is sketchy, and, as a result, the stars are left with too much to do, but its serialisation on the radio gives it a flying start with the public."

The Monthly Film Bulletin wrote: "Basil Radford and Naunton Wayne are in their best and most benignly idiotic mood throughout this light-hearted nonsense, yet manage to convey subtly that there may be something in this old school tie business after all. Cyril Gardiner is urbanely sinister as the mysterious 'K.7', Greta Gynt makes a charming spy and Noel Hood gives a delightfully exaggerated picture of a virtuous English maiden."

Variety wrote "a top-heavy script and lax direction see opening reels treated hit-and-miss."

== Home media ==
The film is included on the 2007 The Lady Vanishes DVD and Blu-ray (Criterion Collection).
