= It's Not Cricket (1949 film) =

- British pressbook
- Directed by: Alfred Roome; Roy Rich
- Written by: Gerard Bryant; Lyn Lockwood; Bernard McNabb
- Produced by: Betty E. Box; Peter Rogers
- Starring: Basil Radford; Naunton Wayne; Susan Shaw; Maurice Denham
- Cinematography: Gordon Lang
- Edited by: Esmond Seal
- Music by: Arthur Wilkinson
- Distributed by: Gainsborough Pictures
- Release date: April 1949
- Running time: 77 minutes
- Country: United Kingdom
- Language: English

It's Not Cricket is a 1949 British comedy film directed by Alfred Roome and starring Basil Radford, Naunton Wayne, Susan Shaw and Maurice Denham. It was written by Gerard Bryant, Lyn Lockwood and Bernard McNabb. It is the second (after 1941's Crook's Tour) of two starring films for Radford and Wayne. It was one of the final films made by Gainsborough Pictures before the studio was merged into the Rank Organisation.

== Plot ==
Major Bright and Captain Early are intelligence officers in the British army of occupation in post-World War 2 Germany. They are sent home on leave, but fail to notice that their new batman is actually wanted war criminal Otto Fisch. He vanishes on arrival in England and the two officers are punished by early demobilisation. Uncertain what to do in civvy street, they decide to use the "skills" they learned in the army and set up a private detective agency, "Bright and Early". They engage a secretary, Primrose Brown, but she's not very busy as they have as yet no clients.

Primrose's boyfriend/fiancee invites them all to a weekend country house party for a cricket match, but what they don't know is that the cricket ball they buy in London actually contains a valuable diamond that Fisch has stolen. It has been hidden in the hollow ball by his friend and protector Mr Felix, who runs a sporting goods shop.

As the match gets under way Fisch and Felix watch from the cover of the trees, then infiltrate the game and steal the ball. A free-for-all chase ensues, and Bright and Early manage to recover the ball and the diamond. They have now become celebrities and don't lack for eager clients. Fisch is still working for them, as they remain unaware of his identity.

== Cast ==
- Basil Radford as Major Bright
- Naunton Wayne as Captain Early
- Susan Shaw as Primrose Brown
- Maurice Denham as Otto Fisch
- Nigel Buchanan as Gerald Lawson
- Alan Wheatley as Felix
- Jane Carr as Virginia Briscoe
- Patrick Waddington as Valentine Christmas
- Edward Lexy as Brigadier Falcon
- Leslie Dwyer as Batman
- Frederick Piper as Yokel
- Diana Dors as Blonde woman
- Mary Hinton as Lady Lawson
- Margaret Withers as Mrs Falcon
- Brian Oulton as Simon Herbage
- John Boxer as 1st Military Policeman
- Cyril Chamberlain as 2nd Military Policemen
- Charles Cullum as Sir Leslie Lawson

== Production ==
Alfred Roome directed the film with Roy Rich, with Rich focusing on dealing with the actors. Roome called the movie "a slapstick action thing, really, almost a children’s picture. What I’d do now is cut out all the terrible, boring romance stuff with Susan Shaw; there was a lot of other chat that should have gone too, but other than that, it’s not too bad... We managed to doll the sets and clothes up quite nicely, so that it looked quite expensive."

== Critical reception ==
It was one of 15 films selected by Steve Chibnall and Brian McFarlane in The British 'B' Film, their survey of British B films, as among the most meritorious of the B films made in Britain between World War II and 1970. They said it contained "some of the most humorous moments in a British film of the period", and praised the performances, Maurice Denham's in particular.

The Monthly Film Bulletin wrote: "Basil Radford and Naunton Wayne exploit to the full every humorous possibility to be found in this somewhat thin story, which degenerates into pure slapstick in the closing sequences."
