= Waterloo Road (film) =

1945 British film by Sidney Gilliat

- Directed by: Sidney Gilliat
- Written by: Sidney Gilliat
- Story by: Val Valentine
- Produced by: Edward Black
- Starring: John Mills; Stewart Granger; Joy Shelton; Jean Kent; Alastair Sim
- Cinematography: Arthur Crabtree
- Edited by: Alfred Roome
- Production company: Gainsborough Pictures
- Distributed by: General Film Distributors
- Release date: 5 February 1945
- Running time: 73 mins
- Country: United Kingdom
- Language: English
- Budget: £96,000
- Box office: 522,090 admissions (France)

Waterloo Road is a 1945 British film directed by Sidney Gilliat and starring John Mills, Stewart Granger, and Alastair Sim. It was written by Gilliat from a story by Val Valentine.

According to the British Film Institute, it is the third in an "unofficial trilogy" by Gilliat, preceded by Millions Like Us (1943) and Two Thousand Women (1944).

== Plot ==
A soldier, Jim Colter, goes AWOL to return to his home in Waterloo, London, to save his wife from the advances of Ted Purvis, a philandering conscription-dodger.

== Cast ==
- John Mills as Jim Colter
- Stewart Granger as Ted Purvis
- Alastair Sim as Dr. Montgomery
- Joy Shelton as Tillie Colter
- Alison Leggatt as Ruby
- Beatrice Varley as Mrs. Colter
- George Carney as Tom Mason
- Leslie Bradley as Mike Duggan
- Jean Kent as Toni
- Ben Williams as Corporal Lewis
- Anna Konstam as May
- Vera Frances as Vera Colter
- Wylie Watson as tattooist
- George Merritt as air raid warden
- Ian Fleming as officer at station
- John Boxer as policeman at the fight in arcade
- Frank Atkinson as pub barman

== Production ==
The film was originally known as Blue for Waterloo.

Stewart Granger later said the film was one of his favourites as his role "was a heel, but a real character". He says the film was made in ten days while he was also making Love Story. He was particularly proud of the fight scene with John Mills.

Sidney Gilliat said he was taken off the film before it was finished. Production was stopped and there were still some exteriors to be shot. Producer Edward Black had gone and the Ostrers put the film at the end of the dubbing schedule. However, Earl St John who was in charge of Odeon cinemas liked the film and got the dubbing done.

Gilliat said the idea of using Alastair Sim's character as a commentator was his, though based on the original Val Valentine story. However, he thought the device "proved a bit of a mess".

== Reception ==
According to Kinemaotgraph Weekly the film was a "runner up" at the British box office in 1945.

The Monthly Film Bulletin wrote: "In both writing and directing, Gilliat has achieved a remarkable degree of sincerity, of fidelity to background and character. These humble homes of South London, the friendly bustle of pub and street market, the tawdriness of the small-time shady characters – all are presented with a resolute and austere resistance to temptations to 'glamourise'. The incidentals of scene, character and activity are filled in with such painstaking conscientiousness that they remain in perfect perspective. Laughs are pointed with an unusual nicety of timing and the dialogue achieves at times a height of skill which is as subtle as it is unspectacular. The technical qualities of the film achieve the same veracity – notably the photography and the fisticuffs (under the guidance of Dave Crowley), which rank the climactic fight as one of the most convincing ever filmed fictionally. To complete this modest but most satisfying piece there is refreshingly honest and restrained acting – with Granger successfully rounding out the most difficult role and putting over the showy artificialities of the conceited philanderer."

Kine Weekly wrote: "Robust, romantic melodrama set in the early days of the biitz ... It has neither Technicolor nor the inimitable Noel Coward finesse, but it, nevertheless, gets down to brass tacks without fuss or bother and prefaces its happy and logical ending with one of the best fights seen in British pictures. Good wholesome red meat that will please the crowd all right."

Variety wrote: "Skillful direction and admirable casting give this film satisfactory b.o. potentialities .... it's acted with such sincerity and is so true-to-life in its characterization that the picture grips throughout. There is a terrific climax in which the two men fight for one woman as the bombs thunder down. ... Plcture is a striking example of how sound an English production can be if it keeps to the medium it inteprets best, that of the middle class character."

The Radio Times Guide to Films gave the film 2/5 stars, writing: "This is best remembered today as the wartime movie with a terrific fist-fighting climax as tiny John Mills beats up his wife's lover, six-foot-plus spiv Stewart Granger. If you believe that, you'll probably believe in the rest of this atypically stodgy Sidney Gilliat production. Told in a rather woolly flashback structure by Alastair Sim's kindly philosophising doctor, the plot is extremely realistic for its day, but Arthur Crabtree's stark photography fails to disguise the cramped studio interiors used for much of the film."

Time Out wrote: "No masterpiece, certainly, but it's often funny, sometimes touching, and always wonderfully evocative of the period."

== See also ==
- Waterloo Road
- Waterloo Bridge
- The Cut
