= Frederick Valk =

Anglo-German actor (1895–1956)

- in Hotel Reserve (1944)
- Born: 10 June 1895; Hamburg, Germany
- Died: 23 July 1956 (aged 61); London, England
- Occupation: Actor
- Years active: 1920s–1956

Frederick Valk (10 June 1895 – 23 July 1956) was a German-born stage and screen actor of Czech Jewish descent who fled to the United Kingdom in the late 1930s to escape Nazi persecution, and subsequently became a naturalised British citizen.

Despite making his later career in the English-speaking world, Valk never attempted to shed his heavy accent in either his stage or film work, and it became a trademark, particularly in film where he was often the first choice for a role which called for a German or generic Central European accent.

== Stage career ==
Valk made his first appearance on the London stage in 1939, going on to play in numerous productions of classic drama including leading roles in Shakespeare, with his performances as Shylock in The Merchant of Venice and in the title role of Othello, attracting critical admiration. In 1946 he won the Ellen Terry Award for best actor for his performance in Fyodor Dostoyevsky's The Brothers Karamazov.

Valk also toured overseas, in the 1950s performing at the fledgling Stratford Shakespeare Festival in Canada. When challenged by local journalists that as a Jew he should feel uneasy about playing Shylock, he replied that the assertion made no more sense than saying a Scotsman should baulk at playing Macbeth, that he in fact found a strong pro-Semitic message in the play and that he deplored "that people are beset with prejudices of all sorts and can't bring themselves to wipe their eyes and read and think".

Critics responded with fulsome praise for his performance: "Mr Valk works in the grandest continental manner...every gesture breathes intelligence and every vocal note is true".

The Canadian Jewish Congress however, which had protested vociferously over the inclusion of the play in the Stratford programme, loathed the production, stating: "We were assured ... in advance of the staging of the play that it would not emerge an anti-Semitic production, that Frederick Valk would rise to great heights as Shylock. These predictions did not materialize: the play remains the vilest anti-Semitic production on record."

== Film career ==
Valk never received top-billing in films, but was happy to accept supporting roles in good screen productions. High-profile films in which he featured include The Young Mr. Pitt and Thunder Rock (both 1942); Dead of Night (1945); A Matter of Life and Death (1946); Mrs. Fitzherbert (1947); The Magic Box (1951); and The Colditz Story (1955).

== Death ==
Aged 61, Valk died suddenly in London on 23 July 1956 during the run of the play Romanoff and Juliet in which he was appearing. His wife Diana subsequently wrote a memoir entitled Shylock for a Summer in which she revealed that Valk had been planning to write an autobiography at the time of his death, and had written a note to himself stating: "I don't want to talk at length of my histrionic adventures – the idea of this is to draw a curve of a life, lived in shadow and sun but lived with gratefulness."

== Partial filmography ==
- 1927: Out of the Mist
- 1939: Traitor Spy – German Ambassador (uncredited)
- 1940: Night Train to Munich – Gestapo Officer
- 1940: Neutral Port – Captain Traumer
- 1941: Gasbags – Sturmfuehrer
- 1941: This Man Is Dangerous – Dr. Moger
- 1941: Dangerous Moonlight – Polish Bomber Commander
- 1942: The Young Mr. Pitt – Minor Role (uncredited)
- 1942: Thunder Rock – Dr. Stefan Kurtz
- 1944: Hotel Reserve – Emil Schimler, alias Paul Heimberger
- 1945: Dead of Night – Dr. Van Straaten
- 1945: Latin Quarter – Dr. Ivan Krasner
- 1946: A Matter of Life and Death – RAF Chaplain (uncredited)
- 1947: Mrs. Fitzherbert – King George III
- 1948: Saraband for Dead Lovers – The Elector Ernest Augustus
- 1949: Dear Mr. Prohack – Dr. Viega
- 1951: Outcast of the Islands – Hudig
- 1951: The Magic Box – Maurice Guttenburg
- 1952: Top Secret – Rakov
- 1953: I Chose Love
- 1953: Never Let Me Go – Kuragin
- 1953: The Flanagan Boy – Giuseppe Vecchi
- 1953: Albert R.N. – Camp Kommandant
- 1955: The Colditz Story – Kommandant
- 1955: Magic Fire – Minister von Moll
- 1955: I Am a Camera – Doctor
- 1955: Secret Venture – Otto Weber
- 1956: Wicked as They Come – Mr. Reisner (uncredited)
- 1956: Zarak – Haji Khan (Zarak's father) (final film role)
