= Night Train to Munich =

1940 film

- Theatrical release poster
- Directed by: Carol Reed
- Screenplay by: Sidney Gilliat; Frank Launder
- Based on: “Report on a Fugitive” 1939 short story by Gordon Wellesley
- Produced by: Edward Black
- Starring: Margaret Lockwood; Rex Harrison; Paul Henreid
- Cinematography: Otto Kanturek
- Edited by: R. E. Dearing
- Music by: Louis Levy
- Production company: 20th Century Productions
- Distributed by: 20th Century Fox
- Release dates: 26 July 1940 (UK); 29 December 1940 (USA)
- Running time: 95 minutes
- Country: United Kingdom
- Language: English

Night Train to Munich is a 1940 British thriller film directed by Carol Reed and starring Margaret Lockwood, Rex Harrison, Paul Henreid, Basil Radford, and Naunton Wayne. Written by Sidney Gilliat and Frank Launder, based on the 1939 short story “Report on a Fugitive” by Gordon Wellesley. The film is about an inventor and his daughter who are kidnapped by the Gestapo after the Nazis march into Prague in the prelude to the Second World War. A British secret service agent follows them, disguised as a senior German army officer pretending to woo the daughter over to the Nazi cause.

== Plot ==
As German forces take over Czechoslovakia in March 1939, Axel Bomasch, a Czechoslovak scientist working on a new type of armour-plate, is flown to Britain. Bomasch's daughter, Anna, is arrested before she can reach the airport and sent to a concentration camp, where she is interrogated by Nazis who are pursuing her father. Anna refuses to cooperate. Soon she is befriended by a fellow prisoner named Karl Marsen, who says he is a teacher imprisoned for his political views. Together they are able to escape and make their way to London. Marsen meets with a German doctor who tells him to gain Anna's confidence. Marsen is in fact a Gestapo agent assigned to gain her trust and locate her father.

Following Marsen's suggestion, Anna places a cryptic newspaper advertisement to let her father know she is in the country. Soon after, she gets an anonymous phone call with instructions to go to the town of Brightbourne. There, Anna contacts Dickie Randall, a British intelligence officer working undercover as an entertainer named Gus Bennett. Randall takes Anna to her father, who is now working for the Royal Navy at the fictional Dartland naval base. Anna argues with Randall over her attempt to post a letter to Marsen (with an informative postmark). It does not matter, as Dr. John Fredericks, Marsen's undercover superior in London, has tailed her to Brightbourne.

Soon after, Marsen arranges the kidnapping of Anna and her father and brings them back to Germany by U-boat. Their captors threaten to put Anna in a concentration camp if Bomasch refuses to work for the Nazis. Randall's proposal to rescue the Bomasches is (unofficially) accepted. He travels to Berlin and infiltrates the building where the Bomasches are being held, posing as Major Ulrich Herzog of the Corps of Engineers. He dupes Captain Prada and Admiral Hassinger into believing he was Anna's lover years ago and can persuade her to get her father to co-operate. Randall spends the night with Anna in her hotel room to maintain the pretence. When the Bomasches are ordered to be sent to Munich, he plans to accompany them and arrange their escape. Marsen shows up just as they are about to leave the hotel; he has been assigned to escort them to Munich.

Randall's situation is further complicated at the railway station, where he is recognised by a former classmate named Caldicott, who is leaving Germany with his friend Charters. Randall denies knowing Caldicott but Marsen's suspicions are aroused. When the train makes an unscheduled stop (brought to a halt by a bossy railway station guard played by Irene Handl in an early uncredited bit part) to take on troops, as Britain has declared war on Germany that morning, Marsen takes the opportunity to telephone his headquarters to have Herzog investigated. When Marsen's superiors call back to confirm there is no Major Herzog, Charters, attempting to use another telephone, overhears that Randall will be arrested when they reach Munich.

The two Englishmen barely manage to reboard the train before it leaves. Caldicott slips a warning to Randall, who is thus prepared when Marsen pulls out a gun as they near Munich. Charters and Caldicott overpower first the two guards, then Marsen. After swapping uniforms with Marsen, Randall commandeers a car. They speed up a mountain road, with Marsen and his men in hot pursuit. They reach an aerial tramway; at the other end is neutral Switzerland. Randall manages to shoot all of their pursuers except Marsen, while Anna and the others escape on the tram. Randall then boards the other tram and exchanges shots with Marsen, who reverses the direction of Randall's tram, but he manages to jump to the other tram as it passes. When he hits Marsen in the leg, the latter is either unable, or unwilling, to reach the controls and stop Randall from reaching safety. Randall and Anna embrace.

== Cast ==
- Margaret Lockwood as Anna Bomasch
- Rex Harrison as Dickie Randall / Gus Bennett / Ulrich Herzog
- Paul Henreid as Capt. Karl Marsen (credited as Paul von Hernreid)
- Basil Radford as Charters
- Naunton Wayne as Caldicott
- James Harcourt as Axel Bomasch
- Felix Aylmer as Dr. John Fredericks
- Wyndham Goldie as Charles Dryton
- Roland Culver as Roberts
- Eliot Makeham as Schwab
- Raymond Huntley as Kampenfeldt
- Austin Trevor as Capt. Prada
- Kenneth Kent as Controller
- C. V. France as Admiral Hassinger
- Frederick Valk as Gestapo Officer (credited as Fritz Valk)
- Morland Graham as Teleferic Attendant
- Hugh Griffith as Sailor (uncredited)
- Billy Russell as Adolf Hitler (uncredited)
- Charles Oliver as SS Officer at Concentration Camp (uncredited), and phone caller in Brightbourne (uncredited)

== Production ==
The film was based on a short story by Gordon Wellesley which Sidney Gilliat claims only constituted the first ten minutes of the film, the rest came from him and Launder.

This was the last of the several films that Margaret Lockwood made for Carol Reed. Their professional relationship ended after she turned down the female lead in Kipps.

== Release ==
=== Box office ===
According to Kinematograph Weekly the film did well at the British box office in September 1940.

=== Critical reception ===
The film premiered at the Odeon Leicester Square in London on 26 July 1940. It has a rating of 89% "Fresh" on the review aggregation website Rotten Tomatoes, based on 18 critic reviews, with an average rating of 7.3/10. Prior to the film's initial release, a review by Variety noted that "[m]uch of the film’s merit obviously stems from the compact, propulsive screenplay ... and the razor-edge direction", adding that "[t]here are countless touches of atmosphere and comedy that add immeasurable flavor and zest to the picture".

Simon Abrams of Slant Magazine wrote of the film: "Come for Carol Reed's name, stay for Rex Harrison's performance and a few good cheap shots at the Nazis". Stephen Mayne of PopMatters wrote that the film is "more than just a rerun of The Lady Vanishes", stating that it "overcomes wobbly moments by being so persistently fun".

=== Home media ===
The film was released on LaserDisc by the Roan Group on 14 February 1995. A VHS release followed on 11 February 1997 by Kino Video. It was released on DVD and Blu-ray for the first time by the Criterion Collection on 29 June 2010 and 6 September 2016, respectively.

The title inspired the eponymous song on Al Stewart's interwar theme album, Between the Wars.

== Comparison to The Lady Vanishes ==
The film has been compared to The Lady Vanishes, with the Princeton academic Michael Wood describing it as an "ironic remake"; the publicity at the time of release erroneously claimed it is a sequel. It has a similar situation in a war-torn continental Europe and both have scripts by Launder and Gilliat. The two slightly eccentric and cricket-mad English travellers, Charters and Caldicott, are carried over. The films are otherwise similar in setting, and both feature similar lead character types: the damsel in distress and eccentric upper-class British gentlemen spy, manifesting in the first film as Iris (played by Margaret Lockwood) and Gilbert and in the second as Anna Bomasch (also played by Lockwood) and Dickie Randall.
