= The Next of Kin =

1942 film by Thorold Dickinson

- Directed by: Thorold Dickinson
- Written by: Basil Bartlett; Thorold Dickinson; John Dighton; Angus MacPhail
- Produced by: Michael Balcon
- Starring: Mervyn Johns; Nova Pilbeam; Reginald Tate; Jack Hawkins; Brefni O'Rorke; Stephen Murray; Geoffrey Hibbert; Philip Friend
- Cinematography: Ernest Palmer
- Edited by: Ray Pitt
- Music by: William Walton
- Distributed by: Ealing Studios
- Release date: 15 May 1942
- Running time: 102 minutes
- Country: United Kingdom
- Language: English
- Budget: £50,000
- Box office: £119,129 (UK)

The Next of Kin, also known as Next of Kin, is a 1942 Second World War propaganda film produced by Ealing Studios. The film was originally commissioned by the British War Office as a training film to promote the government message that "Careless talk costs lives". After being taken on by Ealing Studios, the project was expanded and given a successful commercial release. After the war and up until at least the mid 1960s, services in British Commonwealth countries continued to use The Next of Kin as part of security training. The film's title is derived from the phrase "the next of kin have been informed" as used by radio announcers when reporting on the loss of personnel in action.

== Plot ==
In preparing for a secret raid on a German-held French coastal village, a British security officer is chosen to monitor activities in England among army personnel of the 95th Infantry as well as civilians with whom they mingle. At the same time, German intelligence send Agents 23 and 16 to England to obtain information from sources including conversations overheard in pubs, railway stations, shops and other public places. Agent 16 is caught, but 23 reaches his contact, Mr Barratt, a bookseller at Westport, who assigns him the job of infiltrating an ordnance depot. After he helps an ATS driver with a punctured tyre, she invites him to a dance. There, he learns the unit has top priority for special equipment. Agent 23 makes it his task to find out why.

In the meantime, Barratt forces his employee, Dutch refugee Beppie Leemans, to discover the activities of the 95th. She informs him that the 95th Unit is expecting to receive aerial photographs. Barratt sends Agent 23 to London to obtain the photographs. When Leemans realises the seriousness of what she has done, she stabs Barratt to death, but 23 returns unexpectedly and knocks her out. He then turns on the gas and makes it look like a murder–suicide. An agent manages to steal the briefcase containing an aerial negative, carelessly left unattended at a cafe by a wing commander. The officer believes his briefcase was taken by mistake and is relieved when it is returned to the cafe (after a photograph is developed). The photograph is smuggled to German intelligence and used to identify the 95th's objective. As a result, the Germans mobilize to ambush the 95th's commando raid on the French coast.

The raid is carried out and deemed successful, albeit with heavy losses. The film concludes back in England, as we observe two careless talkers on a train, as they are monitored by Agent 23, who is seen taking notes.

== Cast ==
- Guy Guy-Mas as The Frenchman (billed as Quartier-Maitre Guy Guy-Mas)
- Basil Sydney as Naval Captain
- Frederick Leister as Colonel
- Reginald Tate as Major Richards (billed as Sqn. Ldr. Reginald Tate)
- Johnnie Schofield as Lance-Corporal
- Alexander Field as Private Durnford
- Jack Hawkins as Brigade Major (billed as 2nd Lt. Jack Hawkins)
- David Hutcheson as Intelligence Officer (billed as Fl. Lt. David Hutcheson)
- Brefni O'Rorke as The Brigadier
- Phyllis Stanley as Miss Clare
- Richard Norris as Pte. Jimmy (billed as 2nd Lt. Richard Norris)
- Geoffrey Hibbert as Pte. John
- Philip Friend as Lieut. Cummins
- Mary Clare as Mrs. "Ma" Webster
- Torin Thatcher as a German General (billed as Lt. Torin Thatcher)
- Mervyn Johns as No. 23/Mr. Davis (billed as Ft. Lt. Mervyn Johns)
- John Chandos as No. 16
- Nova Pilbeam as Beppie Leemans
- Stephen Murray as Mr. Barratt (billed as L/C Stephen Murray)
- Thora Hird as The ATS Girl
- Frank Allenby as Wing-Comdr. Kenton
- Joss Ambler as Mr. Vernon
- Charles Victor as Neutral Seaman
- Basil Radford as Careless Talker (uncredited)
- Naunton Wayne as Careless Talker (uncredited)
- Alec Faversham as Soldier on Train (uncredited)
- John Dodsworth as Officer Giving Davis a Lift (uncredited)
- Robert Brooks Turner as Depot Worker (uncredited)
- Hal Gordon as Depot Worker (uncredited)

== Release and alternative American version ==
The film opened at the Pavilion Cinema in London on 15 May 1942. The version shown then ran one hour and 42 minutes.

The film opened at the Rialto Theater in New York City almost a year later, on 5 May 1943. On the advice of film mogul David O. Selznick, who believed that American audiences might get the impression that Britain was overrun with spies, the director, Thorold Dickinson, made drastic cuts to the running time, but also added two short extracts from a speech by J. Edgar Hoover as a framing device. This new version of the film ran for about 75 minutes. It is the version released on DVD in the United States by Alpha Video.
