= Faculty of Occupational Medicine (United Kingdom) =

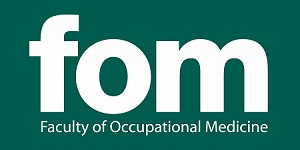
- Formation: 1978
- Location(s): London, SE10; United Kingdom
- Members: 1835
- President: Robin Cordell
- Website: www.fom.ac.uk

The Faculty of Occupational Medicine (FOM) is the professional and educational body for occupational medicine in the United Kingdom. It seeks to ensure the highest standards in the practice of occupational medicine, overseeing the continuing professional development and revalidation of its members.

It is also focused on promoting and supporting health at work, with its mission statement being 'to drive improvement in the health of the working age population'. One way it achieves this goal is through partnerships with other medical bodies, such as the Safe, Effective, Quality Occupational Health Service accreditation scheme it runs with the Royal College of Physicians. The Faculty works closely with the UK Government advising on Occupational Medicine and improving workplace health.

The Faculty is a member of the Council for Work and Health and The Academy of Medical Royal Colleges.

== History ==
The organisation was established in 1978 as a faculty of the Royal College of Physicians, becoming an independent body with its own governance, membership and finances in December 1992. Originally focused exclusively on the professional development of occupational physicians, the Faculty has since expanded its portfolio of qualifications to include a diplomas aimed at benchmarking the standards of occupational health provision in fields as diverse as general practice, aviation medicine and disability assessment medicine.

== Activities ==
The Faculty is primarily responsible for education and training of medical doctors who work in occupational medicine in the UK. It devises and oversees the implementation of the Specialist Curriculum in Occupational Medicine, and administers over postgraduate training within the NHS, armed forces and industry. It also runs the MFOM Part 1 and Part 2 examinations which assess Specialty Registrars throughout their training, successful completion of which leads, in most cases, to entry onto the General Medical Council's specialist register and the ability to use the postnominals MFOM. Election of Members of the Faculty to Fellowship (conferring the postnominals FFOM) is the Faculty's way of recognising those who have made a particularly significant contribution to the practice of occupational medicine, or contributed significantly to the work of the Faculty.

The faculty's official journal is Occupational and Environmental Medicine, a monthly peer-reviewed medical journal which covers research in occupational and environmental medicine. Alongside this the Faculty produces a wide number of publications and guidance papers, including the highly influential Ethics Guidance for Occupational Health Practice, Guidance on Alcohol and Drug Misuse in the Workplace and Fitness for Work: The Medical Aspects, which now in its 5th edition.

== Governance ==
The Faculty is governed by a board of trustees which is responsible for the strategic direction of the organisation and for its governance. The board meets four times a year, and to reflect the geographical diversity of members two of these meetings are held at the Faculty offices in London, while the remainder take place in different locations across the UK.

The faculty is registered with the Charity Commission for England and Wales and the Office of the Scottish Charity Regulator (OSCR).
