= Passport to Pimlico =

1949 film directed by Henry Cornelius

- Original UK cinema poster
- Directed by: Henry Cornelius
- Written by: T. E. B. Clarke
- Produced by: Michael Balcon
- Starring: Stanley Holloway; Hermione Baddeley; Margaret Rutherford; Paul Dupuis; Raymond Huntley; John Slater; Jane Hylton; Betty Warren; Barbara Murray; Basil Radford; Naunton Wayne
- Cinematography: Lionel Banes
- Edited by: Michael Truman
- Music by: Georges Auric
- Production company: Ealing Studios
- Distributed by: General Film Distributors (UK)
- Release date: 28 April 1949 (UK)
- Running time: 84 minutes
- Country: United Kingdom
- Language: English
- Budget: £276,787
- Box office: £104,444

Passport to Pimlico is a 1949 British comedy film made by Ealing Studios and starring Stanley Holloway, Margaret Rutherford and Hermione Baddeley. It was directed by Henry Cornelius and written by T. E. B. Clarke. The story concerns the unearthing of treasure and documents that lead to a small part of Pimlico to be declared a legal part of the House of Burgundy, and therefore exempt from the post-war rationing or other bureaucratic restrictions in Britain.

Passport to Pimlico explores the spirit and unity of London after the war and offers an examination of the English character. Like other Ealing comedies, the film pits a small group of British people against a series of changes to the status quo from an external agent. The story was an original concept by the screenwriter T. E. B. Clarke. He was inspired by an incident during the Second World War, when the maternity ward of Ottawa Civic Hospital was temporarily declared extraterritorial by the Canadian government so that when Princess Juliana of the Netherlands gave birth, the baby was born on Dutch territory and would not lose her right to the throne.

Passport to Pimlico was well-received on its release. The film was released in the same year as Whisky Galore! and Kind Hearts and Coronets. Passport to Pimlico was nominated for the British Academy Film Award for Best British Film and the Academy Award for Writing (Story and Screenplay). There have since been two BBC Radio adaptations: the first in 1952, the second in 1996.

== Plot ==
The film's opening credits end with the words "dedicated to the memory of", with an image of Second World War British food and clothing ration coupons.

In post-Second World War London, an unexploded bomb detonates in Miramont Gardens, Pimlico. The explosion reveals a long-buried cellar containing artwork, coins, jewellery and an ancient manuscript. The document is authenticated by the historian Professor Hatton-Jones as a royal charter of Edward IV that ceded a house and its estates to Charles, the last Duke of Burgundy, when he sought refuge there after being presumed dead at the 1477 Battle of Nancy. As the charter had never been revoked, an area of Pimlico is declared to still be a legal part of Burgundy.

As the British government has no legal jurisdiction, it requires the local residents to form a representative committee according to the laws of the long-defunct dukedom before negotiating with them. Ancient Burgundian law requires that the duke himself appoint a council. Sébastien de Charolais arrives and presents his claim to the title, which is verified by Professor Hatton-Jones. He forms the governing body, which includes Spiller, the local policeman; Mr. Wix, the manager of the bank branch; and Arthur Pemberton, a neighbourhood shopkeeper, who is appointed as Burgundy's prime minister. The council begin discussions with the government, particularly about the Burgundian treasure.

After it dawns on people that Burgundy is not subject to post-war rationing or other bureaucratic restrictions, the district is quickly flooded with black marketeers and shoppers. Spiller is unable to handle the rising tide of problems by himself. In response, the British authorities surround the Burgundian territory with barbed wire. The residents retaliate against what they see as heavy-handed bureaucratic action; they stop a London Underground train as it passes through Burgundy, and ask to see passports of all passengers: those without documents are prevented from proceeding.

The British government responds by breaking off negotiations and isolating Burgundy. Power, water and deliveries of food are all cut off at the border. The residents are invited to "emigrate" to England, but they are defiant. Late one night, the Burgundians covertly connect a hose to a nearby British water main and fill a bomb crater, solving the water problem, but this floods the food store. Unable to overcome this new problem, the Burgundians prepare to give up. Sympathetic Londoners begin to throw food parcels across the barrier, and soon others join in. A helicopter pumps milk through a hose, and pigs are parachuted into the area.

The British government comes under public pressure to resolve the situation. It becomes clear to the British diplomats assigned to find a solution that defeating the Burgundians through starvation is both difficult and unpopular with the British people, so they negotiate. The sticking point turns out to be the disposition of the unearthed treasure. Wix, now the Burgundian chancellor of the exchequer, suggests a Burgundian loan of the treasure to Britain. With the final piece of the deadlock eliminated, Burgundy reunites with Britain, which also sees the return of rationing for food and clothing to the area. The celebratory outdoor banquet is interrupted by heavy rain and the temperature plunges.

== Cast ==
- Stanley Holloway as Arthur Pemberton
- Betty Warren as Connie Pemberton
- Barbara Murray as Shirley Pemberton
- Paul Dupuis as Sébastien de Charolais, Duke of Burgundy
- John Slater as Frank Huggins
- Jane Hylton as Molly Reed
- Raymond Huntley as Mr. Wix
- Philip Stainton as PC Spiller
- Roy Carr as Benny Spiller
- Sydney Tafler as Fred Cowan
- Nancy Gabrielle as Mrs. Cowan
- Malcolm Knight as Monty Cowan
- Hermione Baddeley as Edie Randall
- Roy Gladdish as Charlie Randall
- Frederick Piper as Jim Garland
- Charles Hawtrey as Bert Fitch
- Margaret Rutherford as Professor Hatton-Jones
- Naunton Wayne as Straker
- Basil Radford as Gregg
- Paul Demel as Central European
- Michael Hordern as the Metropolitan policeman
- Michael Craig (uncredited)
- Arthur Howard as Bassett

== Themes ==
Passport to Pimlico contains numerous references to the Second World War and the postwar Labour Government to accentuate the spirit within the small Burgundian enclave. The scholar of film studies, Charles Barr, in his examination of the Ealing films, observes that in opposing the British government, the Burgundians "recover the spirit, the resilience and local autonomy and unity of wartime London". Barr suggests the actions "re-enact, ... in miniature, the war experience of Britain itself". The film historian Mark Duguid, writing for the British Film Institute, considers that the opposition is a "yearning nostalgia for the social unity of the war years".

The film historians Anthony Aldgate and Jeffrey Richards describe Passport to Pimlico as a progressive comedy because it upsets the established social order to promote the well-being of a community. The view of the community put forward in the film has been criticised as being anachronistic, as the wartime unity had already passed by 1949. According to Aldgate and Richards, the welcome return to the ration books at the end of the film signifies an acceptance that the measures of the British government are in the best interests of the people.

The device of pitting a small group of British against a series of changes to the status quo from an external agent leads the British Film Institute to consider Passport to Pimlico, along with other of the Ealing comedies, as "conservative, but 'mildly anarchic' daydreams, fantasies". At the close of the story, when the summer heatwave turns to a torrential downpour, the film has "something of the quality of a fever-dream", according to Aldgate and Richards.

According to the film historian Robert Sellers, Passport to Pimlico "captures the most quintessential English traits of individualism, tolerance and compromise"; Duguid sees the examination of the English character as being "at the heart" of the film. This was one of the aspects that appealed to Margaret Rutherford, who liked the way the British were portrayed "accentuating their individuality and decency, while acknowledging some parochial idiosyncracies".

== Production ==
Passport to Pimlico was produced by Michael Balcon, the head of Ealing Studios; he appointed Henry Cornelius as director. The film was one of three comedies to be produced simultaneously, alongside Whisky Galore! and Kind Hearts and Coronets; all three were released into UK cinemas over two months. (Note: Brian McFarlane, writing for the Oxford Dictionary of National Biography, states that although it was not an aim of releasing the three films together, together they "established the brand name of 'Ealing comedy'".)

The plot was an original story by T. E. B. Clarke, a writer of both comedy and drama scripts for Ealing; his other screenplays for the studio include Hue and Cry (1947), Against the Wind (1948), The Blue Lamp (1950), The Lavender Hill Mob (1951) and The Titfield Thunderbolt (1953). Clarke was inspired by an incident during the Second World War, when the maternity ward of Ottawa Civic Hospital was temporarily declared extraterritorial by the Canadian government so that when the then-Princess Juliana of the Netherlands gave birth to Princess Margriet of the Netherlands, the baby was born on Dutch territory, and would not lose her right to the throne. The airlift of food supplies into the Burgundian enclave was influenced by the flights of food and supplies during the Berlin Blockade of June 1948 – May 1949.

The music for the film was composed by Georges Auric, who had been involved in several other productions for Ealing Studios.

The lead part of Pemberton was initially offered to Jack Warner. He turned down the role because he was committed to another film, and so the part was instead offered to Stanley Holloway. Alastair Sim was offered the role of Professor Hatton-Jones, but after he turned it down, Margaret Rutherford was cast instead.

=== Filming ===
Passport to Pimlico is set during a heatwave that occurred in Britain in 1947, but, despite this, filming took place during 1948's abnormally wet summer. The poor weather caused delays in production, which led to the film being over-time and over-budget. Shooting started early each day, in an attempt to get the first successful shot completed before 9:00 am. An average of ten takes a day were taken, in an attempt to get two and a half minutes of usable film per day. (Note: By comparison, commercial filming practice in 2015 was to take an average of 40 takes a day with 10 seconds a day of usable film recorded.) There were arguments between Cornelius and Balcon throughout the production, because Balcon was unhappy with what he saw as poor direction. Cornelius left Ealing Studios after working on Passport to Pimlico and did not work for the studio again.

The outdoor scenes were not shot in Pimlico, but about a mile away in Lambeth. A set was built on a large Second World War bombsite just south of the Lambeth Road at the junction of Hercules Road. At the conclusion of filming, the site had to be returned to the same bomb-damaged state as before, to enable the locals to claim war damage compensation. The site has since been built on, and now features 1960s municipal flats.

== Release ==
Passport to Pimlico was released into UK cinemas on 28 April 1949; the film was financially successful. For the US release on 23 October 1949, soil was imported and placed in front of the cinema; commissionaires in the uniform of a British policeman would hand out mock passports and invite passers-by to step onto English soil to see the film. The film was shown at the 1949 Cannes Film Festival, although it was not entered into the competition.

== Reception ==
=== Box office ===
The film earned distributor's gross receipts of £104,444 in the UK of which £81,436 went to the producer. The film made a loss of £251,938.

=== Critical ===
Critics warmly praised Passport to Pimlico on its release. Several commended the script. The reviewer for The Manchester Guardian thought that "the chief credit for ... [this] joy of a film should go to T. E. B. Clarke". The unnamed reviewer for The Monthly Film Bulletin considered that "every line, every 'gag', is a little masterpiece of wit", while the critic C. A. Lejeune, writing for The Observer, thought that the writing and direction were excellent; she went on to record that "the end comes too soon, which is something that can be said of very few films".

The acting was also praised by many of the critics; Lejeune thought that "the acting of the countless small character parts that the plot brings together is splendid", while the reviewer for The Monthly Film Bulletin considered that "each character, and indeed every individual member of the lengthy cast, provides a gem of comedy acting at its highest and best". The Manchester Guardian reviewer was critical about aspects of the direction which, it was said, was undertaken "with barely sufficient skill to sustain the fun". The critic Henry Raynor, writing for Sight and Sound, thought that the film "sacrificed a comic enquiry into motives and personality to a farcical romp ... It was carried through, not by wit or polish, but by a sometimes hysterical jollity". Leslie Halliwell gave it four of four stars: "A cleverly detailed little comedy which inaugurated the best period of Ealing, its preoccupation with suburban man and his foibles. Not exactly satire, but great fun, and kindly with it." He stated further that "though it now seems over-contrived, was certainly the film which first established the Ealing vein in the public imagination. Anyone could recognize in this pleasantly tall tale innumerable spoofing references to the age of austerity and strained foreign relations through which Britons were then living."

Passport to Pimlico was nominated for the British Academy Film Award for Best British Film, alongside Whisky Galore! and Kind Hearts and Coronets, although they lost to The Third Man (1949); the film was also nominated for the Academy Award for Writing (Story and Screenplay), where it lost to Battleground (1949).

== Adaptations ==
In 1952, a radio adaptation, written by Charles Hatton, was broadcast on the BBC's Light Programme. Charles Leno played Pemberton, in a cast that included Christopher Lee, Gladys Henson and Kenneth Williams. A BBC Radio 4 adaptation, written by John Peacock, was broadcast on 20 January 1996. George Cole played the part of Pemberton; Michael Maloney and Joan Sims also appeared.

The 1993 film Wayne's World 2 was originally planned to be a remake of Passport to Pimlico, but shortly before filming was to begin, executives at Paramount Pictures realised that the studio had not acquired rights to the earlier film and ordered writer/star Mike Myers to write a new screenplay with a different plot.

The 2000 episode "E. Peterbus Unum" of the animated series Family Guy is a direct parody/adaptation of the film. In the episode, an oversight is discovered in municipal records leading to the protagonist declaring his house to be a sovereign nation.

== See also ==
- The Little Switzerland, a 2019 Spanish comedy film partially based on this film
- Frestonia, the name of the "republic" adopted by the residents of Freston Road, London, when they attempted to secede from the United Kingdom in 1977
- Micronations
- BFI Top 100 British films

== Sources ==
- Aldgate, Anthony; Richards, Jeffrey (1999). Best of British: Cinema and Society from 1930 to Present. London: I.B.Tauris. ISBN 978-1-86064-288-3.
- Barr, Charles (1977). Ealing Studios. Newton Abbot, Devon: David & Charles Publishers. ISBN 978-0-7153-7420-7.
- Duguid, Mark; Freeman, Lee; Johnston, Keith M.; Williams, Melanie (2012). Ealing Revisited. London: Palgrave Macmillan. ISBN 978-1-84457-510-7.
- Geraghty, Christine (2002). British Cinema in the Fifties: Gender, Genre and the 'New Look'. London: Routledge. ISBN 978-1-134-69464-8.
- Sellers, Robert (2015). The Secret Life of Ealing Studios. London: Aurum Press. ISBN 978-1-78131-397-8.
- Merriman, Andy (2010). Margaret Rutherford: Dreadnought with Good Manners. London: Aurum Press. ISBN 978-1-84513-585-0.
- Mitchell, Neil (2011). World Film Locations: London. London: Intellect Books. ISBN 978-1-84150-484-1.
- Wilson, A. N. (2004). London: A Short History. London: Orion. ISBN 978-0-297-60715-1.

=== Further reading ===
- D'Arcy, Chantal Cornut-Gentille (June 2012). "Classic Comedy as a Barometer for Present Times or the Debunking of Categorical Delineations of Nationality in Passport to Pimlico (Henry Cornelius, 1949)". Atlantis. 34 (1): 11–26. JSTOR 43486018.
- Williams, Tony (1994). "The Repressed Fantastic in Passport to Pimlico". In Dixon, Wheeler W. (ed.). Re-Viewing British Cinema, 1900–1992: Essays and Interviews. New York: SUNY Press. pp. 95–106. ISBN 978-0-7914-1862-8.
