= A Girl in a Million =

- Original trade ad
- Directed by: Francis Searle
- Written by: Muriel Box; Sydney Box
- Produced by: Sydney Box
- Starring: Hugh Williams; Joan Greenwood; Basil Radford; Naunton Wayne
- Cinematography: Reginald H. Wyer
- Music by: Benjamin Frankel
- Production company: British Lion Films
- Distributed by: Associated British-Pathé
- Release date: 28 October 1946 (UK)
- Running time: 90 minutes
- Country: United Kingdom
- Language: English
- Box office: £138,510

A Girl in a Million is a 1946 British comedy film. It is notable for featuring Joan Greenwood in an early starring role; and Basil Radford and Naunton Wayne in their comedy double act as two cricket-obsessed Englishmen, this time called Fotheringham and Prendergast.

== Plot ==
Tony is a researcher who is divorced by a shrewish, nagging wife. He is offered the opportunity to head an important, but remote research station, staffed only by men; he accepts.

American Colonel Sultzman arrives with a "certain something" to drop off to Tony's predecessor, who was killed in an accident two weeks before. That something turns out to be the deceased's 19-year-old grandniece, Gay, who was sent to America for the duration of the war. The ship she was on was torpedoed, and she was in the water for 10 hours; the traumatic experience rendered her mute. She has no other relatives, so Tony reluctantly allows her to stay the night. Upon questioning her the next day, Tony discovers that she has little money and nobody who could take her in. He consults with his colleagues, Prendergast and Fotheringham, and agrees to let her stay until other arrangements can be made. However, she soon makes herself useful, cooking and cleaning.

Charmed by her and by the contrast with his former talkative wife, Tony falls in love and marries her. However, once they are wed, Tony begins to wish that she could speak, to tell him she loves him. Then, when they are attending a concert, a mine drifts in and explodes, damaging a nearby pier. Tony volunteers to try to disarm a second mine. When Gay sees him being lowered to the mine, she shouts his name. Tony disarms the mine, and Gay recovers her speech. However, she goes to the opposite extreme, talking incessantly and driving Tony to distraction. Finally, he tells her the truth. It is not just him. Predergast and Fotheringham are annoyed, and their longtime servant Peabody quits. She leaves him.

Finally, after some months, Tony is called to the hospital. There he discovers that she has become mute again. Furthermore, he is presented with their baby boy. Tony is delighted, and they embrace. However, while he is out of the room, she answers a telephone call; she is only feigning being unable to speak.

== Cast ==
- Hugh Williams as Tony
- Joan Greenwood as Gay
- Basil Radford as Prendergast
- Naunton Wayne as Fotheringham
- Wylie Watson as Peabody
- Yvonne Owen as Molly
- Hartley Power as Colonel Sultzman
- Edward Lexy as Policeman
- James Knight as Pavilion Manager
- Charles Rolfe as Attendant
- Gwen Clark as Nurse
- Millicent Wolf as Sister
- Aubrey Mallalieu as Judge
- Garry Marsh as General
- Michael Hordern as Divorce Counsel
- Julian D'Albie as Dr Peters
- John Salew as Jenkins
- John Olson as Concert Stage Manager
- Muir Mathieson as Conductor
- Eileen Joyce as Solo Pianist

== Reception ==
=== Box office ===
It was the 24th most popular film at the British box office in 1946 after The Wicked Lady, The Bells of St Marys, Piccadilly Incident, The Captive Heart, Road to Utopia, Caravan, Anchors Away, The Corn is Green, Gilda, The House on 92nd Street, The Overlanders, Appointment with Crime, The Bandit of Sherwood Forest, Kitty, Spellbound, Scarlet Street, Men of Two Worlds, Courage of Lassie, Mildred Pierce, The Spiral Staircase' and Brief Encounter, The Years Between and The Dolly Sisters.

=== Critical reception ===
Sandra Brennan wrote in Allmovie, "feminists beware! This blatantly sexist comedy may definitely raise a few hackles"; while David Parkinson in the Radio Times called it "an object lesson in how tastes change, this chauvinistic comedy was co-scripted (with producer-husband Sydney) by Muriel Box, who was one of the few female creatives with clout in postwar British cinema. Moreover, it made a star of Joan Greenwood in a role that basically dismisses women as blethering nuisances who should be seen and not heard...Talk about not standing the test of time."
