= Michael Aldridge =

English actor (1920–1994)

- Aldridge as Seymour in Last of the Summer Wine
- Born: 9 September 1920; Glastonbury, Somerset, England
- Died: 10 January 1994 (aged 73); Greenwich, London, England
- Occupation: Actor
- Years active: 1939–1994
- Spouse: Kirsteen Rowntree (m. 1947)
- Children: 3

Michael William ffolliott Aldridge (9 September 1920 – 10 January 1994) was an English actor. He was known for playing Seymour Utterthwaite in the BBC Television sitcom Last of the Summer Wine from 1986 to 1990. He also had a long career as a character actor on stage and screen dating back to the 1930s.

== Early life ==
The son of Dr Frederick James Aldridge and his wife Kathleen Michaela Marietta White, Aldridge was born in Glastonbury, Somerset, on 9 September 1920. He was educated at Gresham's School, Holt, Norfolk, where he acted in school plays. In his last year at school he played the title role in a production of Othello, a report in The Times noting "M. W. ff. Aldridge (aged 17½ years) was masterly and dignified as Othello and well worthy of the formal designation 'a noble Moor'".

His younger brother John Aldridge became a doctor and medical consultant.

== Career ==
Aldridge started his acting career in August 1939 at the Palace Theatre, Watford, appearing in Terence Rattigan's play French Without Tears. A few days later, World War II broke out. From 1939 to 1940, he was in rep at Bristol, Blackpool, Sunderland, Sheffield, Bradford and Amersham. In 1940, he joined the Royal Air Force as a bomber navigator and served in Africa, the United States, the Middle East and the Mediterranean, leaving the service in 1945 as a flight lieutenant.

After the war, Aldridge returned to acting, and toured with the Arts Council Midland Theatre Company from 1946 to 1948, but it was not until 1954 that his career started to gain him recognition, when he took a role in Salad Days at the Vaudeville Theatre, where he remained until 1957. He played many roles in musicals throughout his career, usually in supporting roles in which he was highly reliable and professional.

=== Theatre ===
Aldridge's first professional appearance was in the part of Kenneth in French without Tears, at the Palace Theatre, Watford, in August 1939. He was in rep until 1940. His first West End appearance was in This Way to the Tomb, playing the Prologue and the Mechanic, at the Garrick Theatre, 1946; toured with the Arts Council Midland Theatre Company from November 1946 to July 1948; appeared in Nottingham Theatre Trust productions from November 1948 to March 1949, playing Othello in Othello at Nottingham, 1948, and at the Embassy Theatre, 1949; with Birmingham rep, 1949; Old Vic Company at New Theatre, 1949-1950: Love's Labour's Lost, She Stoops to Conquer, The Miser, Hamlet; returned to Arts Council Midland Theatre Company, 1950; Bristol Old Vic, 1951-1952: played Macbeth in Macbeth, Two Gentlemen of Verona, Of Mice and Men; Escapade, at St James's Theatre, Strand, London, 1953–1954; Salad Days, Vaudeville Theatre, 1954; Free as Air, Savoy Theatre, 1957; A Moon for the Misbegotten, Arts Theatre, 1960; Vanity Fair, Queen's Theatre, 1962; The Fighting Cock, Duke of York's Theatre, 1966; at Chichester Festival, 1966–1969, and 1971–1972. Heartbreak House, Lyric Theatre, 1967; The Cocktail Party, Wyndham's Theatre, Haymarket, 1968; The Magistrate, Cambridge, 1969; A Bequest to the Nation, Haymarket, 1970; Reunion in Vienna, Piccadilly, 1972; Absurd Person Singular, Criterion Theatre, 1973; The Tempest, Royal Shakespeare Company at The Other Place, 1974; Jeeves, Her Majesty's Theatre, 1975; Lies, Albery Theatre, 1975; The Bed before Yesterday, Lyric Theatre, 1976; Rosmersholm, Haymarket, 1977;The Old Country, Queen's Theatre, 1978; Bedroom Farce, National Theatre at The Prince of Wales, 1978; The Last of Mrs Cheyney, Cambridge, 1980; Noises Off, Lyric, Hammersmith and Savoy, 1982; The Biko Inquest, Riverside, 1984; Relatively Speaking, Greenwich, 1986.

=== Television ===
On television, an early significant role was as criminologist Ian Dimmock in the Granada TV series The Man in Room 17 and its sequel The Fellows (1965–67). His screen work included playing Pistol in Orson Welles' movie Chimes at Midnight in 1967.

In 1974, Aldridge appeared as Grigory Rasputin in the historical drama Fall of Eagles.

In 1975, Aldridge appeared in the title role of Andrew Lloyd Webber and Alan Ayckbourn's musical Jeeves, based on the stories by P. G. Wodehouse. The show was a rare flop for Webber, and the negative critical reaction led to Aldridge giving up his stage career to concentrate on television and film roles.

He played the part of Rollo in the 1977 serial Love for Lydia, produced by London Weekend Television.

He played Percy Alleline in Tinker, Tailor, Soldier, Spy on BBC TV in 1979, Sir Basil in the 6th episode “Neck” of 1st series of Anglia Television's Tales of the Unexpected first aired on ITV in the same year and appeared in the sitcom Yes, Prime Minister, in the episode "One of US".

In 1980, he played the role of Matthew Radlett, Lord Alconleigh, in the television miniseries Love in a Cold Climate - Simon Raven's adaptation of the Nancy Mitford novels Love in a Cold Climate and the Pursuit of Love for Thames Television.

Between 1986 and 1990, he starred as Seymour Utterthwaite in Last of the Summer Wine. The character was an ex-headmaster and inventor, designed to replace the Foggy Dewhurst character played by Brian Wilde, who had left the series. Aldridge's wishing to retire to nurse his sick wife coincided with Wilde's deciding to return to the show, so Aldridge's character was written out.

Aldridge played the elderly professor Digory Kirke in the television version of The Lion, the Witch, and the Wardrobe in 1988.

His obituary in The Times said,

If Aldridge joined the cast of a show, it invariably meant the injection of an extra dimension of dramatic interest, however modest his role in it. In everything he did, if never a big name, he was a professional to his fingertips.

== Personal life ==
Aldridge married Kirsteen Rowntree, and they had three daughters: Charlotte L. Aldridge (born 1948), Harriet K. Aldridge (born 1952) and Emma R. Aldridge (born 1954). He stated his main interests as sailing, market gardening, watching cricket and playing tennis, and he also liked to make his own bread and jam. At the time of his death aged 73 he was living in Greenwich, London.

He had left his role in Last of the Summer Wine to be a full-time carer for his wife.

== Selected filmography ==
- Nothing Venture (1948) - Michael Garrod
- Murder in the Cathedral (1951) - Second Knight
- The World of Tim Frazer (1961, TV series) - Arthur Fairlee
- Life for Ruth (1962) - Dr. Richard Harvard
- Chimes at Midnight (1965) - Pistol
- Follow Me! (1972) - Sir Philip Crouch
- Love for Lydia (1979) - Rollo Aspen
- Tinker Tailor Soldier Spy (1979) - Percy Alleline
- The Agatha Christie Hour (1982) – Dr Lavington
- Reilly, Ace of Spies (1983) - Orlov
- Bullshot (1983) - Prof. Rupert Fenton
- A Voyage Round My Father (1984) (TV) - Headmaster
- Hallelujah! (1983) (TV)
- Charters and Caldicott (1985) (TV) - Caldicott
- Turtle Diary (1985) - Mr. Meager, Bookstore Owner
- Mussolini: The Untold Story (1985) - Matteotti
- Yes Prime Minister (1986) (TV) - Geoffrey - Director General MI5
- Clockwise (1986) - Prior
- Shanghai Surprise (1986) - Mr. Burns
- Murder by the Book (1986) - Edmond Cork
- The Lion, the Witch, & the Wardrobe (1988) - Professor Digory Kirke
- Countdown to War (1989) - Neville Chamberlain
- Inspector Morse episode - The Last Enemy (1989) - Arthur Drysdale
- Last of the Summer Wine (1986–1990) (TV) - Seymour
- Stanley and the Women (1991) (TV) - Dr. Alfred Nash
