= Stop Press Girl =

1949 British film by Michael Barry

- Directed by: Michael Barry
- Screenplay by: T.J. Morrison
- Based on: an original story by T.J Morrison & Basil Thomas
- Produced by: John Croydon
- Starring: Sally Ann Howes; Gordon Jackson; Basil Radford; Naunton Wayne
- Cinematography: Cyril Bristow
- Edited by: Sidney Hayers
- Music by: Arthur Goehr
- Production company: Aquila Film
- Distributed by: General Film Distributors (UK)
- Release date: 2 June 1949 (UK)
- Running time: 78 min
- Country: United Kingdom
- Language: English

Stop Press Girl is a 1949 British fantasy comedy film directed by Michael Barry and starring Sally Ann Howes, Gordon Jackson, Basil Radford and Naunton Wayne; the latter two appearing in several different roles in the film. It marked an early screen appearance by Kenneth More, who later co-starred with Howes in The Admirable Crichton (1957).

The film was one of the four of David Rawnsley's films that used his "independent frame" technique, a form of back projection.

== Plot ==
Roy Fairfax, junior partner for timepiece manufacturers Fairfax & Sons, arrives in the quiet village of Slipfold to visit his fiancée Jennifer Peters and ask her uncle for permission to marry. On his way through town in his new motorcar, Roy causes a commotion and spooks the horse of village dentist Arthur Peters. Arriving at her home, Roy encourages Jennifer to join him for a drive and gives her a new watch in lieu of an engagement ring; however, Jennifer explains she never wears a watch, as they always seem to stop. After only fifteen minutes Roy's car stops working as does the watch he gave to Jennifer and later his own watch, a fact which frightens Roy, as it could ruin the reputation of his father's company. Jennifer, however, is able to perfectly tell the time without the need for a watch.

Roy and Jennifer walk home where Roy nervously awaits his meeting with Jennifer's uncle Arthur, whom Roy now knows is the same man whose horse he spooked earlier. Arthur tests Roy by roughly examining him on the dentist 'schair whilst Roy attempts to pitch why he would be a respectable suitor for Jennifer. Arthur then explains that all the women in his family, including Jennifer, inherit a strange ability,: they areable to stop any mechanical device they encounter from working. Roy flees the house afterwards. That night Arthur and his sister, Aunt Mab, debate telling Jennifer about her gift, although Arthur believes she is not yet old enough. Jennifer catches the train to London following Roy, where she meets a group of journalists, including Jock Melville, who falls in love with Jennifer. Eventually the train mysteriously stops due to Jennifer's abilities before a tree then falls onto the track. Jennifer and journalist Angela hitch a lift in the back of a truck, leaving Jock behind; however, later the truck breaks down. Jock arrives in the back of a cart and picks up Jennifer, leaving Angela behind. As Jock and Jennifer settle down for the night in their cart, Angela drives past in the now working truck.

The next morning Arthur and Aunt Mab discover Jennifer has gone, working out she is heading for London after reading an article about the train miraculously stopping, with Arthur worrying that her abilities will cause chaos in London. In the city, Jennifer visits Fairfax & Sons and asks to see Roy but is mistakenly introduced to his father John Fairfax, who takes Jennifer on a tour round their London factory and showroom. During the tour all the machines and clocks stop, and after Jennifer leaves, Roy arrives and tells his father about Jennifer's abilities. Later, Jennifer attempts to stop a smash -and-rab robbery but ends up being bundled into the thief's car, which breaks down. The thieves are caught, but Jennifer is knocked out in the process, causing the car to start up again as her powers stop working while Jennifer is asleep or unconscious. Jock rescues her from the police and writes an article about her involvement in stopping the robbery, which prompts Angela to become interested in her story.

Arthur and Aunt Mab head to London to find Jennifer, with Mab sedated for most of the journey to negate her own ability to stop mechanical devices. They meet Jennifer's roommate Carole who has stayed at home with a bad tooth and has asked Jennifer to cover her shift; however, she works as an air hostess, which causes a worried Arthur and Mab to hurry to the airport in a horse-drawn milk cart to stop the plane from taking off. They are too late, however, and the converted Handley Page Halifax takes off with Jennifer, Jock, Roy, and John Fairfax on board. Roy and John panic when they see Jennifer and tell Jock about her abilities, who then tells Jennifer. As the plane stops working Jock parachutes out with Jennifer, and they land safely. The next morning Jennifer wakes up to find that Jock has headed back to London on his own and written a story about Jennifer, her abilities, and how she saved the plane, which has caused her to become an over-ight sensation, being dubbed "the miracle girl". Angela remains unconvinced by Jennifer's supposed abilities.

Jennifer tells Jock that she is appalled by his story and how he selfishly used her for his big break and says she will never speak to him again. She then tries to return to London but is turned away at the train station and by buses and motorists who have read the story, so she asks Carole for help. Angela overhears and arranges to take Jennifer back to London by horse and cart, testing her abilities on the way and writing an article about Jennifer being a fake when she fails to stop her watch (although this is due to Jennifer sleeping for the whole journey). Angela's article prompts a nation-wide media frenzy as journalists continue writing articles either supporting or disregarding Jennifer and extending challenges for her to prove if her abilities are real. Throughout this, Jock repeatedly tries to see Jennifer, but she refuses to let him up. With Carole's help, Jock sneaks up to her room; however, Jennifer furiously kicks him out after he suggests accepting the challenge to prove her powers. Later, however, Jennifer agrees to the challenge when Arthur suggests Jock might lose his job if people don't believe his stories. Jennifer, Jock, Angela, and other journalists assemble at the Evening Comet machine room to see if Jennifer can stop their printing press. After fifteen minutes the machines begin to slow and a triumphant Jennifer and Jock embrace; however, immediately the machines begin to speed up again. Arthur and Aunt Mab explain that the abilities Jennifer possesses stop the moment she falls in love and continue to not work as long as she remains in love, causing an excited Jock to write another story explaining why she failed the challenge. Jennifer and Jock marry; however, when Jock rushes off to chase an interview on the train the pair are riding, it stops, causing Jock to return and apologise. However, Jennifer points out that the train stopping had nothing to do with her abilities.

== Main cast ==
- Sally Ann Howes as Jennifer Peters
- Gordon Jackson as Jock Meville
- Basil Radford as The Mechanical Type
- Naunton Wayne as The Mechanical Type
- James Robertson Justice as Arthur Peters
- Sonia Holm as Angela Carew
- Nigel Buchanan as Roy Fairfax
- Joyce Barbour as Aunt Mab
- Campbell Cotts as John Fairfax
- Cyril Chamberlain as Johnnie
- Julia Lang as Carole Saunders
- Percy Walsh as editor, Evening Comet
- Oliver Burt as editor, Morning Sun
- Kenneth More as Police Sgt. "Bonzo"
- Humphrey Lestocq as radio commentator
- Michael Goodliffe as McPherson

== Critical reception ==
The Monthly Film Bulletin wrote: "Although the theme is exploited to the full by a painstaking cast the film proves weak and unsatisfying. No effort is made to explain how the girl, brought up in luxurious, sophisticated surroundings, could possibly have reached the age of eighteen without becoming aware of her unusual powers. Sally Ann Howes and Gordon Jackson, as Jennifer and Jock, make the best of their unrewarding parts."

TV Guide called it "A British comedy with a premise that promises but never delivers."

Allmovie wrote, "Stop Press Girl is admittedly a one-joke film, though that joke is a good one."
