= Helter Skelter (1949 film) =

- Original British trade ad
- Directed by: Ralph Thomas
- Written by: Patrick Campbell
- Produced by: Antony Darnborough
- Starring: David Tomlinson; Carol Marsh
- Cinematography: Jack Asher
- Edited by: Bob Wilson
- Music by: Francis Chagrin
- Production company: Gainsborough Pictures
- Distributed by: General Film Distributors
- Release date: 7 August 1949
- Running time: 84 minutes
- Country: United Kingdom
- Language: English
- Box office: £84,000 (by 1953)

Helter Skelter is a 1949 British romantic comedy film directed by Ralph Thomas and starring Carol Marsh, David Tomlinson and Mervyn Johns. It was written by Patrick Campbell.

A radio star becomes involved with a wealthy heiress. The title is a common expression to describe a situation of "chaotic and disorderly haste".

The recurring English comic characters Charters and Caldicott also appeared in the film.

== Plot ==
Susan Graham is a discontented heiress whose joint guardians are both trying to get her married to their odious nephews. On her nineteenth birthday, the five of them visit a nightclub called the Magnolia Club; also present happens to be radio star Nick Martin, whom Susan detests. When she is inadvertently seated at Martin's table directly in front of the floor show, she refuses to move, and Martin, despite his radio reputation as a fearless detective, is too intimidated by her hauteur to insist. This, however, proves to be a mixed blessing for Susan; when the evening's principal performer, a ventriloquist, comes out, she laughs so hard at his routine that she gets a bad case of the hiccups. She attempts to cure them by getting a drink of water, but succeeds only in getting caught in the crossfire of a pie fight.

Four days later, Susan's hiccups still haven't stopped, and her doctor recommends that her guardians take her to a certain haunted house for a good fright. On the way, they stop at a pub for directions, and Susan runs into Nick Martin again. At first, she is still chilly towards him, but then the narrator shoots the two of them with Cupid's arrow, and they immediately fall in love. Martin's overbearing mother, however, soon comes to take him away – but not before the two of them have arranged a rendezvous.

The plot then proceeds to the haunted house, where Susan's guardians, not believing in the ghost, have hired an actor to play the part. Susan, however, slips away to her rendezvous before he begins working; consequently, she still has the hiccups when Mrs Martin finds her and Nick trysting together. This fact doesn't amuse Mrs Martin, who apparently believes that hiccups are contagious; she forbids Susan to see her son again, and suggests that she see a psychiatrist about her problem.

The psychiatrist concludes that, because Susan got the hiccups from laughing, she can rid herself of them if she laughs that hard again. He recommends “a fellow on a BBC show called Jimmy Edwards”; Susan accordingly goes to the BBC studios, where, naturally enough, she meets Nick again. The two of them arrange a date at the Magnolia Club, ostensibly so Susan can cure her hiccups by laughing at the ventriloquist again, but really so they can gaze into each other's eyes all night. Their reverie is interrupted, however, by Mrs Martin, who shows up at the club and orders her son home. When Nick fails to stand up to her, Susan, disgusted, storms out of the club, inspiring Nick, a little too late, to develop a backbone and tell his mother off.

Returning home, Susan writes a letter to Nick breaking off their relationship, but the Martin address turns out to be unlisted. She therefore returns to the BBC and leaves the letter on his microphone; on her way back out, however, she mistakes the door and ends up locking herself in a cupboard. The next morning, she turns up missing; Nick, frantic, sets all of England looking for her, and at first refuses to broadcast until she's found. Being persuaded, however, that his programme is necessary for the social stability of the nation, he returns to the BBC that evening; in the course of the broadcast, the cupboard door is opened, and Susan tumbles out, unconscious. She is, however, quickly revived – and, what is more, when she sees her guardians’ nephews (who have inadvertently locked themselves into, and then flooded, the mixing room), she bursts out laughing, thereby finally curing herself of the hiccups. She and Nick fall into each other's arms, and all ends happily.

== Stand-alone segments ==
Helter Skelter is as much a variety programme as it is a narrative film; it includes numerous scenes that have only the faintest connection with the plot, and are included principally for their stand-alone comedy value. The following are noteworthy:

- The ventriloquist routine that gives Susan the hiccups is shown in full; it features Robert Lamouret and a duck puppet named Dudule.
- While Susan is being shown her bedroom at the haunted house, the maid has a fantasy in which she becomes a notorious 17th century courtesan, the romantic interest of both Oliver Cromwell and King Charles II.
- In a vain attempt to make Susan laugh, the psychiatrist shows her scenes from the silent-comedy film Would You Believe It!, starring Walter Forde, involving four spies trying to seize an inventor's briefcase.
- During Susan's first trip to the BBC, Terry-Thomas is shown as a frantic disc jockey whose assistant has broken the record he was supposed to play; in desperation, he attempts to sing the song himself, despite sounding nothing like the original recording artist. (This would later become a staple routine of Thomas's, known as the "Technical Hitch" sketch.)
- At the very end of the film a brief appearance is made by a mermaid, and David Tomlinson stares at her, saying she’s “someone [he] once knew”; this is in reference to the film Miranda (1948), which he starred in with Glynis Johns.

== Cast ==
- Carol Marsh as Susan Graham
- David Tomlinson as Nick Martin
- Mervyn Johns as Ernest Bennett
- Peter Hammond as Spencer Stone
- Richard Hearne as Professor Pastry
- Peter Haddon as Major Basil Beagle
- Geoffrey Sumner as Humphrey Beagle
- Jon Pertwee as head waiter / Charles II
- Zena Marshall as Giselle
- Terry-Thomas as himself
- Jimmy Edwards as Dr. James Edwards
- Colin Gordon as Chadbeater Longwick
- Judith Furse as Mrs. Martin
- Edmund Willard as Ezekial
- Harry Secombe as Alf (uncredited)
- Henry Kendall as Lord Bruce Carlton
- Wilfrid Hyde-White as Dr Jekyll/Mr Hyde
- Patricia Raine as maid/Amber
- Bill Fraser as Oliver Cromwell
- George Benson as temporary waiter
- Ronald Adam as Director General of the BBC

== Production ==
Director Ralph Thomas called the film "one of those 'Friday night pictures'" he made under Sydney Box. "You were quite likely to finish shooting on Friday, plan to go into the cutting rooms on Monday to look over your stuff and get your cut ready, then go for a drink, and you'd be given another script and be told, 'The sets are standing and you start on Monday – this is the cast!' It wasn't necessarily good and we didn't get a lot of money, but it was regular."

Thomas did not "particularly want to make comedies, but I said I'd enormously admired a crazy American picture called Hellzapoppin! We cast it well and enjoyed making it, although I never quite understood the storyline. Funnily enough it has become a sort of cult picture in odd places."

Associate producer Alfred Roome called it "terrible, you couldn't do anything with that."

== Reception ==
The Monthly Film Bulletin wrote: "Every conceivable formula for laughter is employed, including revue sketches, an early Walter Forde comedy, custard pies, and trick photography, but although the cast strives had for laughs, the fim is a dismal failure. Carol Marsh and David Tomlinson as the petulant lovers do not improve the situation and the atmosphere of forced hilarity is wearisome"

In British Sound Films: The Studio Years 1928–1959 David Quinlan rated the film as "poor", writing: "one of the best casts ever wasted on a terrible film; gets worse the harder it tries."

Ralph Thomas later said the film "was too crazy for any audience... it would have made a perfectly good radio show but had no possible visual appeal."
