= The Lady Vanishes =

1938 film by Alfred Hitchcock

- Theatrical release poster
- Directed by: Alfred Hitchcock
- Screenplay by: Sidney Gilliat; Frank Launder
- Based on: The Wheel Spins by Ethel Lina White
- Produced by: Edward Black (Note: Uncredited.)
- Starring: Margaret Lockwood; Michael Redgrave; Paul Lukas; Dame May Whitty
- Cinematography: Jack E. Cox
- Edited by: R. E. Dearing
- Music by: Louis Levy; Charles Williams
- Production companies: Gainsborough Pictures; Gaumont-British Picture Corporation
- Distributed by: Metro-Goldwyn-Mayer (United Kingdom); Twentieth Century-Fox (United States)
- Release dates: 7 October 1938 (London); 1 November 1938 (United States)
- Running time: 97 minutes
- Country: United Kingdom
- Languages: English; German; French; Italian
- Budget: £104,904

The Lady Vanishes is a 1938 British mystery thriller film directed by Alfred Hitchcock and starring Margaret Lockwood and Michael Redgrave. Written by Sidney Gilliat and Frank Launder, based on the 1936 novel The Wheel Spins by Ethel Lina White, the film is about an English tourist travelling by train in continental Europe who discovers that her older travelling companion seems to have vanished. After her fellow passengers deny ever having seen the older lady, the young woman is helped by a young musicologist. Together they search the train for clues to the woman's disappearance.

The Lady Vanishes was filmed at the Gainsborough Studios in Islington, London. It was the first feature film released under a distribution deal between the British Gaumont-British Picture Corporation and the American Metro-Goldwyn-Mayer (MGM) under a joint agreement in which MGM provided half of the film's funding as well as handling its theatrical release in the UK. Hitchcock caught Hollywood's attention with the film and moved to Hollywood soon after its release. Although the director's three previous efforts had done poorly at the box office, The Lady Vanishes was widely successful, and confirmed American producer David O. Selznick's belief that Hitchcock indeed had a future in Hollywood cinema.

The British Film Institute ranked The Lady Vanishes the 35th best British film of the 20th century. In 2017, a poll of 150 actors, directors, writers, producers and critics for Time Out magazine saw it ranked the 31st best British film ever. It is one of Hitchcock's most renowned British films, and the first of three screen versions of White's novel as of January 2021.

== Plot ==
After visiting the fictional country of Bandrika, English tourist Iris Henderson is returning home to get married, but an avalanche blocks the railway line. The stranded passengers are forced to spend the night at a hotel. In the same predicament are Charters and Caldicott, cricket enthusiasts anxious to see the last days of a Test match in Manchester, and Miss Froy, a governess and music teacher. Miss Froy listens to a folk singer in the street, but he is strangled by an unseen murderer.

That evening, Iris is bothered by a loud noise from the room above hers. It is caused by Gilbert Redman, an ethnomusicologist who plays the clarinet for local folk dancers. She attempts to get him removed from the room but fails after he confronts her.

The next morning at the railway station, Miss Froy drops her glasses near Iris and her friends. When Iris tries to return Miss Froy's glasses, she is hit on the head by a large planter dropped from above. Miss Froy helps her onto the train. As she waves goodbye to her friends, Iris faints and then comes to in a compartment with Miss Froy and several strangers. Also on board are Charters and Caldicott, Gilbert, and lawyer Eric Todhunter with his mistress, who is passing herself off as "Mrs Todhunter".

Iris joins Miss Froy in the dining car for tea. Miss Froy gives a package of her favourite tea to the waiter and says she only drinks this brand. Soon after they return to their compartment, Iris falls asleep. When she wakes up, Miss Froy has vanished. The other passengers in the compartment, several other passengers and train staff deny ever seeing her. Todhunter pretends not to remember her to avoid drawing attention to his liaison with his mistress. Gilbert agrees to help Iris search for Miss Froy. Brain surgeon Dr Hartz says Iris may be suffering from "concussion-related hallucinations". Fearing that any delay would make them miss the cricket match, Charters and Caldicott also claim not to remember Miss Froy.

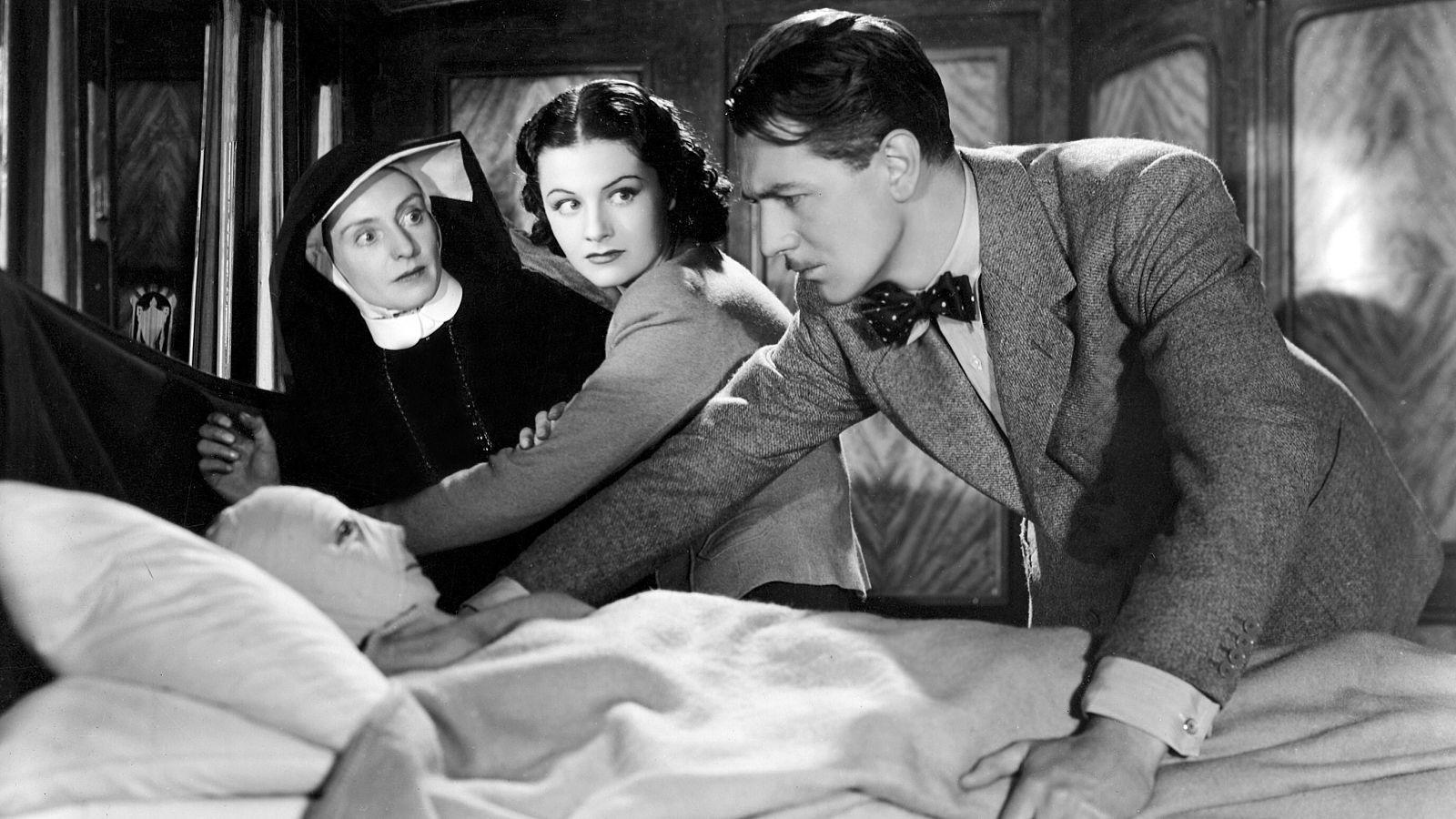
From left, Catherine Lacey, Margaret Lockwood and Michael Redgrave with the bandaged patient

Angry at her lover for his reluctance to pursue a divorce, Todhunter's mistress admits to seeing Miss Froy. At the first stop, Dr Hartz's patient, whose head is completely covered in bandages, is brought aboard on a stretcher and accompanied by an apparently deaf-mute nun. A woman dressed exactly like Miss Froy, Madame Kummer, appears in her place and claims to have helped Iris after she was struck on the head. After Todhunter tells his mistress his wife would never agree to a divorce, she says that Madame Kummer was the woman she saw. Iris briefly doubts her own memory, but while in the dining car with Gilbert, she recalls having tea with Miss Froy and sees where the woman wrote her name on the window. She pulls the emergency brake and faints again.

Gilbert still believes Iris is hallucinating, but when one of the cooks tosses trash out the window, Gilbert sees a tea package wrapper briefly stick to a corridor window and recognizes the special brand Iris told him was Miss Froy's favourite, convincing him of her existence. While continuing their search, Iris and Gilbert find Miss Froy's glasses in the baggage car. However, they are attacked by magician Signor Doppo, who was in Iris's compartment. They lose the glasses in the struggle, and Doppo escapes.

Iris notices that the nun accompanying Dr Hartz's patient is wearing high heels, and they suspect that "patient" has been replaced by Miss Froy. Dr Hartz takes them to the dining cars for a drink and accompanies them back to a compartment, where he admits that the patient is Miss Froy, that he is involved in the conspiracy and that they have been drugged. However the false nun, revealed to be a British woman in costume, did not put the drug into their drinks out of loyalty to her fellow countrymen. Gilbert and Iris escape, free Miss Froy and replace her with Madame Kummer.

When the train stops near the border, Dr Hartz discovers the switch. He has part of the train diverted onto a branch line, where soldiers wait. Gilbert and Iris inform their fellow passengers what is happening. A uniformed soldier boards and requests that they all accompany him. They knock him out and take his pistol. Another soldier fires, wounding Charters in the hand.

During the ensuing gunfight, Miss Froy tells Gilbert and Iris that she must get away as she is actually a British spy. Just in case, she gives them a message (encoded in a tune) to deliver to the Foreign Office in Whitehall — the same tune that the murdered street musician performed for her. Miss Froy then runs into the forest, and those on the train don't know whether or not she is shot. Todhunter attempts to surrender, waving a white handkerchief, but is shot dead. Gilbert and Caldicott commandeer the locomotive, but the knocked-out soldier wakes up and threatens the rest of the guests. The false nun escapes through a side door and switches the tracks but is shot in the leg. However, Gilbert and Caldicott manage to pull her up into the train before she is left behind.

In London, Charters and Caldicott discover the Test Match has been cancelled due to flooding. Seeing her fiancé from a distance at the station, Iris jumps into a cab with Gilbert, who kisses her. They arrive at the Foreign Office, but in the waiting room Gilbert realizes he cannot remember the vital tune. As they are led into the office, Gilbert and Iris hear it. The doors open, revealing Miss Froy playing the tune on a piano.

== Cast ==
- Margaret Lockwood as Iris Matilda Henderson
- Michael Redgrave as Gilbert Redman
- Paul Lukas as Dr. Egon Hartz
- May Whitty as Miss Froy (credited as Dame May Whitty)
- Cecil Parker as Mr. Eric Todhunter
- Linden Travers as "Mrs." Todhunter
- Naunton Wayne as Caldicott
- Basil Radford as Charters
- Mary Clare as Baroness Athona
- Emile Boreo as the hotel manager
- Googie Withers as Blanche
- Sally Stewart as Julie
- Philip Leaver as Signor Doppo
- Selma Vaz Dias as Signora Doppo
- Catherine Lacey as the nun
- Josephine Wilson as Madame Kummer
- Charles Oliver as the officer
- Kathleen Tremaine as Anna

== Production ==
=== Development ===
The Lady Vanishes was originally called The Lost Lady, and Irish director Roy William Neill was assigned by producer Edward Black to make it. A crew was dispatched to Yugoslavia to do background shots, but when the Yugoslav police accidentally discovered that they were not well-portrayed in the script, they kicked the crew out of the country, and Black scrapped the project. A year later, Hitchcock could not come up with a property to direct to fulfil his contract with Black, so he accepted when Black offered The Lost Lady to him.

=== Writing ===
Hitchcock worked with the writers to make some changes to tighten up the opening and ending of the story, but otherwise the script did not change much. As was the case with several of Hitchcock's films, he collaborated with his wife Alma Reville on the script.

The plot of Hitchcock's film differs considerably from White's novel. In The Wheel Spins, Miss Froy really is an innocent lady looking forward to seeing her octogenarian parents; she is abducted because she knows something (without realizing its significance) that would cause trouble for the local authorities if it came out. Iris's mental confusion is due to sunstroke, not a blow to the head. In White's novel, the wheel keeps spinning: the train never stops, and there is no final shoot-out. Additionally, the supporting cast differs somewhat; for instance, in the novel, the Gilbert character is Max Hare, a young British engineer building a dam in the hills who knows the local language, and there is also a modern-languages professor character who acts as Iris's and Max's interpreter who does not appear in the film. The cricket-obsessed characters Charters and Caldicott were created especially for the film and do not appear in the novel.

The plot device of swapping characters concealed in bandages appears in the 1923 Agatha Christie short story The Kidnapped Prime Minister.

The plot has clear references to the political situation leading up to the Second World War. The British characters, originally trying their hardest to keep out of the conflict, end up working together to fight off the jack-booted foreigners, while the lawyer who wishes to negotiate with the attackers by waving a white flag is shot and killed.

The script has been called "one of the most perfect of all time".

=== Casting ===
At first, Hitchcock considered Lilli Palmer for the female lead, but went instead with Margaret Lockwood, who was at the time relatively unknown but was under contract to Gainsborough and being built into a star by Edward Black. Lockwood was attracted to the heroines of Ethel Lina White's stories, and accepted the role.

Michael Redgrave was also unknown to the cinema audience, but was a rising stage star at the time. He was reluctant to leave the stage to do the film, but was convinced by John Gielgud to do so. As it happened, the film, Redgrave's first leading role, made him an international star. However, according to Robert Osborne, host of Turner Classic Movies, Redgrave and Hitchcock did not get along; Redgrave wanted more rehearsals, while Hitchcock valued spontaneity more. The two never worked together again.

Alfred Hitchcock can be seen at Victoria Station, wearing a black coat and smoking a cigarette, near the end of the film. The film marks the first appearance of the comedy double-act Charters and Caldicott (played by Naunton Wayne and Basil Radford).

=== Filming ===
The film was shot at Islington Studios, Shepherd's Bush and on location in Hampshire at Longmoor Military Camp, the site of the Longmoor Military Railway.

It was the first film to be made under an agreement between Gaumont-British and the American studio Metro-Goldwyn-Mayer (MGM), in which Gaumont provided MGM with some of its Gainsborough films for release in the United Kingdom; in exchange, MGM paid half the production costs as well as handling the film's theatrical distribution in England. In the case of The Lady Vanishes, however, Twentieth Century-Fox handled the American release. Filming was briefly interrupted by an electricians' strike.

Elisabeth Weis contends that Hitchcock's use of sound in The Lady Vanishes uses the "classical style" – that is, that the director eschews expressionistic sounds in favour of sounds heard in a realistic context. For example, when Iris faints on the train, rather than extraneous noises to denote delirium, only the sound of the train is heard. Another striking use of sound is how evil things are often heard before they are shown. The evil Dr Hartz often is first heard before he appears on screen, representing an aural intrusion "not so much an invasion of privacy as of security".

== Release ==
The Lady Vanishes premiered in London on 7 October 1938. It marked the first joint venture between the British Gaumont-British Picture Corporation and the American distributor Metro-Goldwyn-Mayer (MGM), the latter of which handled the film's theatrical release in England. In the United States, the film was distributed by Twentieth-Century Fox.

=== Copyright status and home media ===
The Lady Vanishes is copyrighted worldwide. Hitchcock's British films were public domain in the United States for a while. They have been heavily bootlegged on home video. Despite this, various licensed releases have appeared on Blu-ray, DVD and video on demand worldwide.

The Criterion Collection issued the film on LaserDisc in 1989, followed by a DVD release in 1998. Criterion reissued the film on DVD in 2007 featuring a new restoration, which was later released on Blu-ray in 2011.

== Reception ==
=== Critical response ===
When The Lady Vanishes opened in the UK it was an immediate hit, becoming the most successful British film to that date. It was also very successful when it opened in New York. In a contemporary review, the Monthly Film Bulletin described the film as an "out of the ordinary and exciting thriller", praising Hitchcock's direction and the cast, especially Michael Redgrave, Paul Lukas and Dame May Whitty.

The film has retained its popularity; in his review for the BBC, Jamie Russell gave the film four out of five stars, calling it a "craftily sophisticated thriller" and a "cracking piece of entertainment". Leslie Halliwell gave it four of four stars: "Superb, suspenseful, brilliantly funny, meticulously detailed entertainment." In his review for BFI Screenonline, Mark Duguid wrote that the film was "arguably the most accomplished, and certainly the wittiest of Hitchcock's British films, and is up there with the best of his American work". Duguid singled out the young writing partnership of Frank Launder and Sidney Gilliat, noting:

The story is blessed by great characters and many witty and imaginative touches, in particular the conceit by which the passengers are each given selfish motives for refusing to verify Iris' story. As well as the chemistry between the two leads, the film has some of Hitchcock's best character parts, with Basil Radford and Naunton Wayne particularly good value as the cricket obsessed Charters and Caldicott.

Pauline Kael wrote: "Alfred Hitchcock's murder mystery...is directed with such skill and velocity that it has come to represent the quintessence of screen suspense." The American film critic and historian Leonard Maltin gave the film four out of four stars in his Movie Guide: "Delicious mystery-comedy; Hitchcock at his best..." and included it in his list of 100 Must-See Films of the 20th Century. The Guardian called the film "one of the greatest train movies from the genre's golden era", and a contender for the "title of best comedy thriller ever made" . The film frequently ranks among the best British films of all time.

On Metacritic, it has a score of 98 out of 100, based on reviews from 17 critics, indicating "universal acclaim". In 2016, Empire ranked the film at No. 82 on their list of "The 100 best British films". In 2017, the film was included in the BFI's list of 100 essential thrillers. In 2022, Time Out magazine ranked the film at No. 54 on its list of "The 100 best thriller films of all time".

=== Accolades ===
The Lady Vanishes was named Best Picture of 1938 by The New York Times.

Award/association	Year	Category	Recipient(s) and nominee(s)	Result	Ref.
New York Film Critics Circle	1939	Best Director	Alfred Hitchcock	Won	
New York Film Critics Circle	1939	Best Film		Nominated	

== Spin-offs ==
The cricket-obsessed Charters and Caldicott were created for the film, but became popular in their own right, and appeared in a series of films, radio programmes and a much later TV series.

== See also ==
- BFI Top 100 British films

== Sources ==
- Kael, Pauline (1991) [1982]. 5001 Nights at the Movies. New York City, New York: Henry Holt and Company. ISBN 978-0-805-01367-2.
- Peary, Danny (1986). Guide for the Film Fanatic. New York City, New York: Simon & Schuster. ISBN 978-0-671-61081-4.
- Spoto, Donald (1992). The Art of Alfred Hitchcock (Second ed.). New York City, New York: Anchor Books. pp. 70–75. ISBN 978-0-385-41813-3.
- Weis, Elisabeth (1982). The Silent Scream: Alfred Hitchcock's Sound Track. Rutherford, New Jersey: Fairleigh Dickinson University Press. ISBN 978-0-838-63079-2.

Further reading

- Mayer, Geoff (2003). Guide to British Cinema. Westport: Greenwood Press. ISBN 978-0-313-30307-4.
- Rich, Nathaniel (4 December 2007), "The Lady Vanishes: Hitchcock's First Hitchcock Film", Slate.
- Spoto, Donald (1999). The Dark Side of Genius (Centennial ed.). New York: Da Capo Press. ISBN 978-0-306-80932-3.
- Vermilye, Jerry (1978). The Great British Films. London: Citadel Press. pp. 42–44. ISBN 978-0-8065-0661-6.
