= Margaret Withers =

British actress (1893–1977)

Margaret Withers 1939 Spotlight photo

Margaret Withers (6 July 1893 – 26 October 1977) was a British actress mainly on the stage.

== Filmography ==
Year	Title	Role	Notes
1935	Car of Dreams	Mrs. Hart	
1943	The Demi-Paradise	Mrs. Elliston	Uncredited
1944	Don't Take It to Heart	Mrs. Smith	
1945	Great Day	Miss Jane Tyndale	
1945	The Seventh Veil		Uncredited
1947	Dual Alibi	Blackpool Landlady	Uncredited
1947	The Upturned Glass	Party Guest	
1948	Blanche Fury	Mrs. Hawkes	
1948	Daybreak	Mrs. Bigley	
1948	The Winslow Boy	Mrs. Jordan	Uncredited
1948	Esther Waters	Grover	
1948	Quartet	Gushing Woman	(segment "The Colonel's Lady")
1949	That Dangerous Age	May Drummond	
1949	It's Not Cricket	Mrs. Falcon	
1950	The Astonished Heart	Talkative Woman at Party	Uncredited
1951	Encore	Mrs. Bateman	(segment "The Ant and the Grasshopper")
1952	Home at Seven	Mrs. Watson	
1952	It Started in Paradise	Miss Madge	
1954	The Million Pound Note	Minor Role	Uncredited
1954	Conflict of Wings	Mrs. Tilney	
1954	Beau Brummell	Countess Marie Duvarre	Uncredited
1957	That Woman Opposite	Lady Helena Lawes	
1957	The Flying Scot	Middle-Aged lady	
1959	The 39 Steps	Teacher at St. Catherines	Uncredited
1959	Ferry to Hong Kong	Miss Carter	
1960	Beyond the Curtain	Elderly British Lady	Uncredited
1965	How to Undress in Public Without Undue Embarrassment		
1991	TV Maigret	MM.Serre, elderly murderer.	
