= Michael Culver =

British actor (1938–2024)

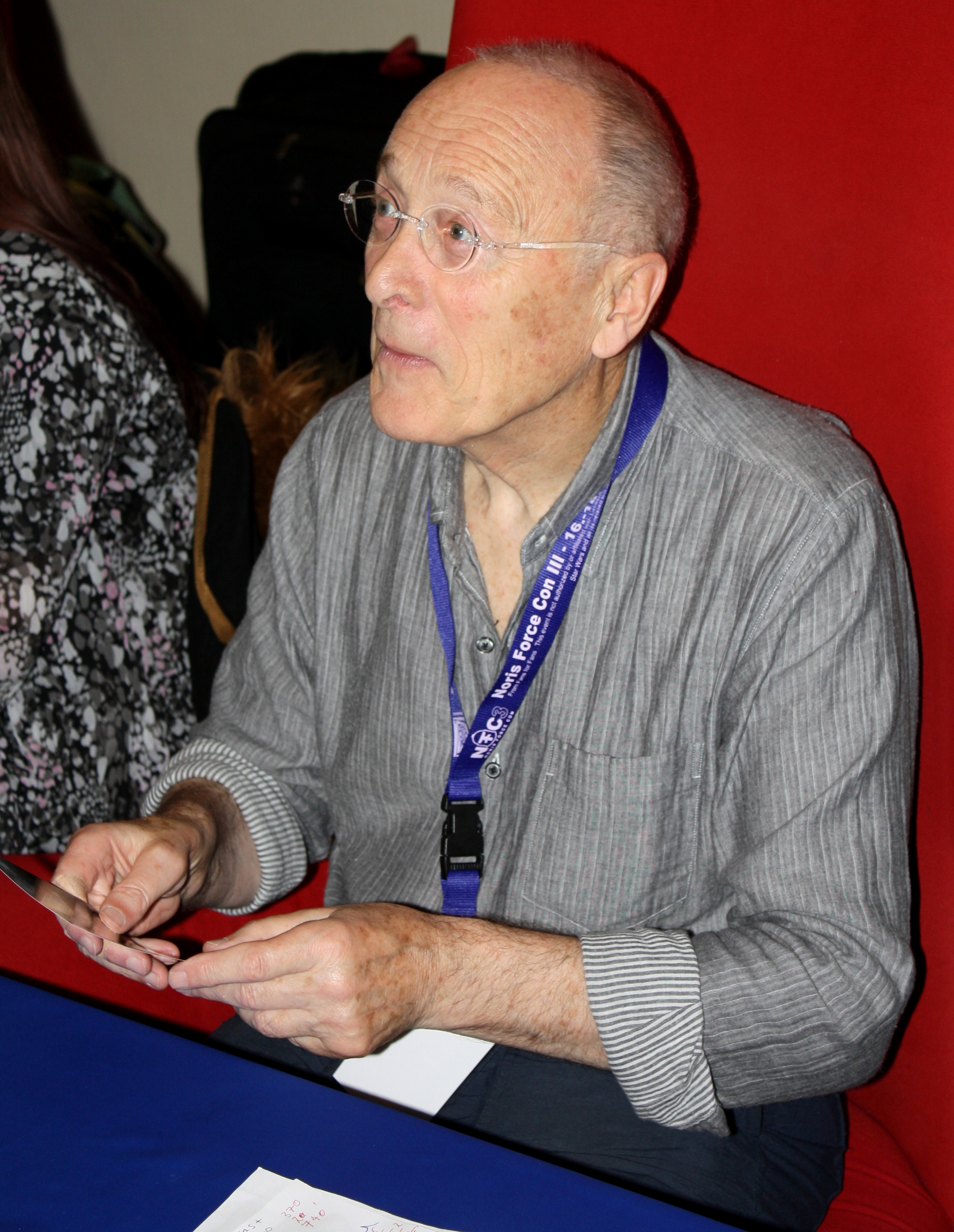
- Culver in 2011
- Born: Michael John Edward Culver; 16 June 1938; Hampstead, London, England
- Died: 27 February 2024 (aged 85)
- Occupation: Actor
- Years active: 1956–2024
- Spouses: Lucinda Curtis (m. 1962; div. 1986) Amanda Ward (m. 2004)
- Children: 3
- Parent(s): Roland Culver; Daphne Rye

Michael John Edward Culver (16 June 1938 – 27 February 2024) was a British actor. He played Captain Needa in The Empire Strikes Back.

== Personal life ==
Michael John Edward Culver was born on 16 June 1938 in Hampstead, London, England, UK. He was the son of actor Roland Culver and casting director Daphne Rye. He was educated at Gresham's School and trained at London Academy of Music and Dramatic Art.

Culver was twice married. In 1962, he married actress Lucinda Curtis, with whom he had three children. They divorced in 1986. He married sculptor Amanda Ward in 2004.

Culver died on 27 February 2024, at the age of 85.

== Actor ==
Culver's aunt, father, mother and brother all had theatrical careers. Culver gained experience at the Old Vic, Dundee Rep (performing in 35 plays in 2 years) and London Academy of Music and Dramatic Art.

Culver appeared in several television series in recurring roles, as Squire Armstrong in The Adventures of Black Beauty (1972–74), Major Erwin Brandt in the BBC drama Secret Army (1977–78), crooked banker Ralph Saroyan in the second series of The House of Eliott (1992) and the strict Prior Robert ('Brother Prior') in Cadfael (1994–98).

His guest roles included an episode of The Sweeney as Dave Leeford (episode Money, Money, Money; 1978), The Professionals (1982) as Lawson, Minder as DS Chisholm's temporary replacement DS Soames (episode Poetic Justice, Innit?; 1982), Miss Marple "The Moving Finger" (1985) as Edward Symmington and as Sir Reginald Musgrave, in the episode "The Musgrave Ritual" (1986) in the Granada Television series The Return of Sherlock Holmes.

Culver appeared in two uncredited roles in James Bond films. In From Russia With Love (1963), he played a man in a punt which was followed as the co-pilot of Avro Vulcan, (Callsign Ramjet MBX-79), in Thunderball (1965). Other film roles are Captain Needa in The Empire Strikes Back (1980) and also a major part in A Passage to India (1984) as a bigoted police inspector. In 2008, he appeared in a guest role in Sidetracked, the first episode of Wallander. Culver was in the first ever episode of New Tricks in 2003 as a corrupt dinosaur detective.

Culver performed in three of Tricycle Theatre’s Tribunal Plays: Nuremberg (A distillation of the 1945–46 Nuremberg trials – of leading Nazi war criminals); Half the Picture (From transcripts from the Scott Inquiry into Arms-to-Iraq – the first play to be performed in the Palace of Westminster.) and The Colour of Justice (The dramatisation of the evidence given during Sir William Macpherson’s inquiry into the murder of Stephen Lawrence, his family's search for justice and endemic racism in the police force). They were directed by Nicolas Kent. The Colour of Justice and Half the Picture and were broadcast by the BBC Television.

== Theatre ==
=== With Dundee Repertory Theatre 1959–1961 ===
- The Curious Savage by John Patrick Directed by Anthony Page.
- In Search of Happiness by Victor Rozov Translated by Nina Froud. Directed by Anthony Page.
- Fools Rush In by Kenneth Horne, Directed by Anthony Page.
- A Streetcar Named Desire by Tennessee Williams. Directed by Anthony Page.
- Tomorrow's Child by John Coates.
- Great Expectations by Charles Dickens.
- The Cat and the Canary by John Willard, Directed by Anthony Page Designer: Chris J. Arthur.
- The Critic and the Heart by Robert Bolt. Directed by Anthony Page.
- See How They Run by Philip King. Directed by Anthony Page Designer: Philip King.
- Born Yesterday by Garson Kanin. Directed by Anthony Page Designer: Peter Gray.
- Death of a Salesman by Arthur Miller. Directed by Anthony Page Edward Furby.
- Five Finger Exercise by Peter Shaffer. Directed by Anthony Page.
- Roar Like a Dove by Lesley Storm. Directed by Lesley Storm.
- The Blind Madonna by Neil Curnow Directed by Raymond Westwell.
- Eighty in the shade by Clemence Dane. Directed by Raymond Westwell
- Dear Brutus by Sir James Matthew Barrie. Performance marking the centenary year of playwright J.M. Barrie's birth. Directed by Raymond Westwell.
- Any Other Business by Campbell Singer Directed by Anthony Page.
- Lucky Strike by Michael Brett.
- Caught Napping by Geoffrey Lumsden. Directedy Raymond Westwell.
- Summer of the Seventeenth Doll by Ray Lawler. Directed by Raymond Westwell.
- Gilt and Gingerbread by Lionel Hale. Directed by Raymond Westwell.
- I Have Been Here Before by J. B. Priestley. Directed by Raymond Westwell.
- Murder on Arrival by George Batson. Directed by Raymond Westwell.
- Sinbad the Sailor by James Grout and Ken Wynne, Directed by Raymond Westwell.
- The Importance of Being Earnest by Oscar Wilde. Directed by Raymond Westwell.
- Brothers in Law by Ted Willis and Henry Cecil. Directed by Raymond Westwell
- Present Laughter by Sir Noël Coward Directed by Raymond Westwell.
- The Long and the Short and the Tall by Willis Hall. Directed by Raymond Westwell.
- The Manor of Northstead by William Douglas-Home. Directed by Raymond Westwell.
- Love in a Mist by Kenneth Horne Directed by Mary Evans and James Ward.
- Not in the Book by Arthur Watkyn. Directed by Raymond Westwell.
- The Vanity Case by Jack Popplewell. Directed by Raymond Westwell.
- Charley's Aunt by Brandon Thomas. Directed by Raymond Westwell.
- Love from a Stranger by Agatha Christie adapted by Frank Vosper. Directed by Anthony Page.
- The Durable Element by Cliff Hanley. Directed by John Crockett.

=== Shakespeare at the Old Vic ===
Directed by Michael Benthall

- The Famous History of the Life of King Henry VIII
- The Tragedy of King Lear
- Midsummer Night’s Dream
- The Tragedy of Hamlet, Prince of Denmark (fights arranged by Bernard Hepton).
- King Henry VI
- Twelfth Night
- The Sleeping Prince by Terence Rattigan The Stratham Hill Theatre, 1956. Directed by Anthony Knowles.

=== London and West End ===
- Judith by Jean Giraudoux, adapted by Christopher Fry, Her Majesty's Theatre, Haymarket and Theatre Royal, Brighton, 1962. Directed by Harold Clurman.
- The Master Builder by Henrik Ibsen, Translated by Michael Meyer, The New Arts Theatre Club, 1962. Directed by Terence Kilburn. Michael Culver played Ragnar Brovik. The cast included: Keith Pyott, Andrew Cruickshank, Viola Keats and Mary Miller.
- Alexander in A Severed Head, Criterion Theatre, 1963, by Iris Murdoch and J. B. Priestley, Directed by Val May.

=== Tricycle Theatre ===
- Gore-Booth and Sir Nicholas Lyell in Half the Picture, adapted by Richard Norton-Taylor With additional material by John McGrath; Tricycle Theatre, 1994. Directed by Nicolas Kent. This was the first play to be performed in the Palace of Westminster.
- Ragnar Brovik in The Master Builder by Henrik Ibsen, Translated by Michael Meyer, The New Arts Theatre Club, 1962. Directed by Terence Kilburn.
- Albert Speer in Nuremberg Transcripts edited by: Richard Norton-Taylor; Tricycle Theatre, 1996. Directed by Nicolas Kent.
- Sir William Macpherson in The Colour of Justice, edited by Richard Norton-Taylor, transferred to the Lyttelton Theatre and toured the UK, 1999. Directed by Nicolas Kent, assisted by Surian Fletcher-Jones, it won Best Touring Production in Theatrical Management Association Awards.
- Fashion by Doug Lucie; Haymarket Theatre, Leicester, transferred from to the Tricycle Theatre 1989–1990.

=== Touring productions ===
- Mr Wickham in Pride and Prejudice from the novel by Jane Austen; toured 1966. Produced/Directed by Sheila Hancock.
- Rosmersholm by Henrik Ibsen (Hong Kong)
- Blithe Spirit by Noël Coward. (1988 – toured Norway and Sweden)

=== Other ===
- Ellis Petersen in A Share in the Sun by Terence Kelly and Campbell Singer, New Theatre, Oxford and Cambridge Theatre, 1966. Directed by Harold French.
- Peter Quilpe in The Cocktail Party by T. S. Eliot, Theatre Royal, Windsor, 1966. Directed by Neville Jason.
- Charles in Howards End adapted by Lance Sieveking in collaboration with Richard Cottrell from the novel by E. M. Forster; toured 1967. Directed by Dacre Punt.
- Mike Danbury in Anything For Baby by Talbot Rothwell and William Meyer; Wimbledon Theatre, 1969. Directed by Patrick Cargill
- The Earl of Harpenden in While the Sun Shines by Terence Rattigan; Hampstead Theatre Club, 1972. Directed by Alec McCowen
- Young Macduff in Macbeth by William Shakespeare Haymarket Theatre, Leicester, 1978. Directed by John Tydeman.
- Lord Goring in An Ideal Husband by Oscar Wilde, at the Theatre Royal, Windsor, Berkshire, 1979 (the 1295th Production). Directed by Joan Riley
- Roald Amundsen in Terra Nova by Ted Tally; Watford Palace Theatre, 1982. Directed by Michael Attenborough
- Hugo in The Little Heroine by Nell Dunn; Nuffield Theatre, University of Southampton, 1988. Directed by Ian Watt-Smith.
- Time and the Conways by J. B. Priestley, Royal Exchange, Manchester
- Two Plays for Gaza, 2009 (Seven Jewish Children by Caryl Churchill and The Trainer by David Wilson & Anne Aylor at the Hackney Empire

== Radio and voice work ==
- The Burning Glass by Jo Anderson and Directed Andy Jordan.

"Breizh has a problem. The World Cup looms and all eyes are on FRANCE. Down on the estate, something stirs." Others in the cast: Philip Madoc and Frances Jeater. BBC Radio 4 Saturday Play 30 May 1998 repeated 20 March 1990

- Rachmaninoff Presented by Melvyn Bragg

Michael Culver voiced Rachmaninoff. Other contributions from Vladimir Ashkenazy (speaker and piano), Jonathan Kydd (Yermakov voice over), Boris Berezovskii (piano), Shura Cherkassky (piano), Mikhail Falkov (tenor), Alexander Fedin (tenor), Joan Rodgers (soprano). With Royal Philharmonic Orchestra and Philharmonia Chorus.

- Fatherland by Robert Harris. Adapted and Directed by John Dryden

Cast included Anton Lesser (Xavier March), Graham Padden (Krause), Robert Portal (Jost), Peter Ellis (Max Jarger), Thomas Copeland (Pili), Andrew Sachs, Amanda Walker, Patrick Godfrey, Michael Byrne, Ian Gelder, Angeline Ball, William Scott Masson, Stratford Johns, Eleanor Bron, Dan Fineman, Alice Arnold and Trevor Nichols, with Ned Sherrin, Jonathan Coleman and Alan Dedicoat. Goldhawk Radio production. Broadcast BBC Radio 4, 9 June 1997

- Flight of the Swan by Jean MacVean. BBC Radio 4, 7 August 1982

Cast included: Rosalind Shanks and David Neal. The play deals with human love and how it is so often impossible for one person to really know another.

- Wilderness of Mirrors Unabridged 1989 reading of the novel by Ted Allbeury
- The Shadow of Mir by Nick Fisher and directed by John Dryden. First broadcast BBC Radio 4 on 8 May 1998 as the Friday Play

In 2018, Michael was the primary contributor to an audio monument to the peace campaigner Brian Haw. Still sited in Parliament Square in London, the monument - 'And There Was Brian' - gives Michael's account of how he supported Haw throughout his ten-year campaign against the Iraq War and other military conflicts. The work was created by Michael, alongside Guy Atkins, Nina Garthwaite, James Bulley, and Amanda Ward. The monument can be accessed via the project's website, www.andtherewasbrian.uk.

== Filmography ==
=== Film ===
Year	Title	Role	Notes	Ref.
1963	From Russia with Love	Man in a Punt	Uncredited	
1965	Thunderball	Vulcan Bomber Crewman	Uncredited	
1966	You’ll Know Me by the Stars in My Eyes	Timothy Condon-Watt		
1969	The Body Stealers	Lieutenant Bailes		
1969	Goodbye, Mr. Chips	Johnny Longbridge		
1969	Crossplot	Jim		
1972	The Fast Kill	Jeremy Dryden		
1975	Conduct Unbecoming	Lt. Richard Fothergill		
1976	Short Ends	2nd Policeman		
1977	Colour of Darkness			
1980	The Empire Strikes Back	Capt. Needa		
1984	A Passage to India	Major McBryde		
1991	The Transmission of Roger Bacon	Roger Bacon		
2016	Servants' Quarters			

=== 1961–1970 ===
Year	Title	Role	Notes
1961	You Can't Win	Det. Con. Haywick	Episode: To Await Collection
1962	Maigret		Episode: The White Hat
1962	Studio 4		The Victorian Chaise Longue
1962	Silent Evidence	Reporter	Episode: Driven to the Brink
1963	Picardy Affair		
1963	Moonstrike	Fl. Lt Glynn	Episode: Home by Four
1963	The Plane Makers	Wally	Episode: A Good Night's Work
1963	Suspense	Robin Gregson	Episode: The Patch Card
1965	R3	Lt. Lewis	Episode: The Critical Moment
1966	The Spies	Muir	Episode: Go Ahead, I Only Live Here
1966	Play of the Month	Holborn	Episode: The Devil's Eggshell
1967	The Revenue Men	Foster	Episode: Man in a Wheelbarrow
1967	Summer Playhouse	James	Episode: The Man who Understood Women
1967	Man in a Suitcase	Danny	Episode: The Bridge
1968	ITV Playhouse	Mr. Harrison	Episode: Rogue's Gallery: The Curious Adventures of Miss Jane Rawley
1968	The Gamblers	Jeremy Compton	Episode: The Wrecker
1968	The Avengers	Price	Episode; Get-A-Way!
1969	The First Churchills	Charles Churchill	6 episodes, TV Mini-series
1970	ITV Playhouse	Man	Episode: The Creeper
1970	Tales of Unease	Johnson	Episode: Calculated Nightmare
1970	Drama Playhouse	Jerry	Episode: "The Befrienders – Drink a Toast to Dear Old Dad"

=== 1971–1980 ===
Year	Title	Role	Notes
1971	Elizabeth R	John Tregannon	TV mini-series
1971	Doomwatch	Minister's PPS	Episode: No Room for Error
1971	Persuasion	Captain Harville	3 episodes, TV mini-series
1971	The Ten Commandments	Richard	Episode; Husband and Friend
1971	The Guardians	Paul	Episode: I Want You to Understand Me
1972	The Persuaders!	Kurt	Episode: Nuisance Value
1972	The Befrienders	Jerry	11 episodes
1972	No Exit	Symons	Episode: Queen's Messenger
1972	Villains	Glazebrook/Peter Glazebrook	3 episodes
1972	Shirley's World	Lt Commander	Episode: The Islanders
1972	Public Eye	Dr. Pembroke	Episode: Many a Slip
1972	ITV Saturday Night Theatre	Tony Richards	Episode: Ted
1972–1974	The Adventures of Black Beauty	Squire Armstrong (recurring role)	31 episodes
1973	Special Branch	Health Inspector	Episode: Polonaise
1973	New Scotland Yard	George Reed	Episode: Diamonds Are Forever
1974	Seven Faces of Woman	Robert Spens	Episode: Lets Marry Liz
1975	Härte 10	Axel	3 episodes, TV mini-series
1975	Whodunnit?	Victor Simmons	Episode: Evidence of Death
1975	Thriller	Simon Burns	Episode: Nurse Will Make It Better
1975	Within These Walls	Robin Vestey	Episode: Let the People See
1975	Churchill's People	Earl Spencer	Episode: Mutiny
1975	Sutherland's Law	John Melrose	Episode: A Lady of Considerable Talent
1975	The Main Chance	Roger Lockhart	Episode: We're the Bosses Now
1975	Softly, Softly: Task Force	Paul Ashworth	Episode: Blind Alley
1975	Space: 1999	Pete Irving	Episode: "Guardian of Piri"
1976	Couples	Dennis Jenkins	3 episodes
1976	The Duchess of Duke Street	Major Farjeon	3 episodes
1976	Dame of Sark	Colonel Graham	TV movie
1976–1977	Warship	Lt. Mannering/Commander. Cleveland	2 episodes
1977	ITV Playhouse	Carstairs	Episode: Short Back and Sides
1977	Philby, Burgess and Maclean	Donald Maclean	TV movie
1977	The New Avengers	Walters	Episode: Hostage
1977	Van der Valk	James	Episode: Dead on Arrival
1978	Armchair Thriller	Dr. Walcott Brown	4 episodes: The Limbo Connection Parts 1, 2, 4 and 6
1978	The Sweeney	Dave Leeford	Episode: Money, Money, Money
1978	Crown Court	Dennis Broadley	Episode: Through the Bottom of a Glass Darkly Part 1
1978	Secret Army	Major Erwin Brandt (recurring role)	22 episodes
1979	Call My Bluff		2 episodes
1980	Heartland	Tony Erskine	Episode: Working Arrangements
1980	Breakaway	Ernest Clifford	5 episodes: The Local Affair Parts 1, 2, 3, 5 and 6
1980	Dick Turpin	Colonel De Courcey	Episode: Blood Money
1980	Turtle's Progress	Joseph 'Joey' Chalk	Series 2 Episode 1
1980	Shoestring	Stephen Brook	Episode: Room with a View
1980	Hammer House of Horror	Mark	Charlie Boy
1980	Rain on the Roof	Malcolm	TV movie

=== 1981–1990 ===
Year	Title	Role	Notes	Ref.
1981	The Bunker	Gen. Mohnke	TV movie	
1981	Diamonds	David Kremer	8 episodes	
1981	A Fine Romance	Ben	Episode: Unlucky in Love	
1981	Second Chance	Mr Seymour	3 episodes	
1981	Fanny by Gaslight	Lord Manderstone		
1982	Minder	Soames	Episode: Poetic Justice, Innit?	
1982	ITV Playhouse	Murray	Episode: The Reunion	
1982	Squadron	Grp. Capt. James Christie	10 episodes	
1982	Foxy Lady	Nigel Cavendish	1 episode	
1982	The Professionals	Lt. Col. Peter Lawson	Lawson's Last Stand	
1983	Live from Pebblemill	Duke of Wellington	Episode: The Battle of Waterloo	
1983	All for Love	John (ex-husband)	Episode: Mrs Silly	
1983	The Bounder	Reggie Thorne	Episode: Third Party	
1983	Chessgame	Nick Hannah	6 episodes	
1983	A Breath of Fresh Air	Stanhope Forbes	TV movie	
1985	Miss Marple: The Moving Finger	Edward Symmington	TV mini-series	
1986	The Return of Sherlock Holmes	Sir Reginald Musgrave	Episode: The Musgrave Ritual	
1986	Casualty	James Jarvis	Episode: Blood Brothers	
1988	Hannay	Major Edmund Philipson	Episode: Death with due notice	
1988	Game, Set and Match	Dicky Cruyer	13 episodes	
1989	Countdown to War	Lord Halifax	TV movie	
1989	The Justice Game	Brian Ash	2 episodes	
1989	Saracen	Sir Anthony	Episode: Ratline	
1989	Boon	Greg Simpson	Episode: Love Letters from a Dead Man	
1990	TECX	Mark Frobisher	Episode: A Soldier's Death	
1990	The Green Man	Dr. Thomas Underhill	3 episodes	

=== 1991–2000 ===
Year	Title	Role	Notes	Ref.
1991	The New Zorro	Aragan	Episode: The Whistling Bandit	
1991	Shrinks	Sir Hugo Dyer	1 episode	
1991	For the Greater Good	Sir Christopher St Place	2 episodes	
1991	The Darling Buds of May	Sir George Bluff-Gore	3 episodes	
1992	The House of Eliott	Ralph Saroyan	7 episodes	
1992	Screen One	Mr Gervaise	Episode: Losing Track	
1992	Lovejoy	Arnold Featherstone	Episode: Members Only	
1992	The Piglet Files	Hugo Wittersham	Episode: Guerrillas in the Mist	
1993	Emmerdale	Philip Wallace		
1993	Growing Pains		Episode: "Back in Your Own Backyard"	
1993	Inspector Morse	Maugham Willowbank	Episode: The Day of the Devil	
1994–98	Cadfael	Prior Robert	13 episodes	
1996	Half the Picture	Sir Nicholas Lyell/Gore Booth	TV movie	
1996	Neverwhere	Portico	Episode: Knightsbridge	
1997	Victoria and Albert (Network First	Disraeli	TV mini-series, Episode: A Queen Alone	
1997	Touching Evil	Pathologist	2 episodes	
1997	WOW			
1999	The Colour of Justice	Sir William McPherson	TV movie	
1999	The Queen’s Nose	D. Gallows	Episode: "Harmony’s Return"	

=== 2001–2013 ===
Year	Title	Role	Notes	Ref.
2001	Anybody's Nightmare	Lord Bingham	TV movie	
2003	New Tricks	Ian Lovett	1 episode	
2004	Spooks	Hugo Weatherby	1 episode, uncredited	
2005	Derailed	Lord Cullen	TV movie	
2006	Good Girl, Bad Girl	Koslowski	TV movie	
2006	Murder City	Michael Anderson	Episode: Just Seventeen	
2006	The Impressionists	Cézanne's father	1 episode, TV mini-series	
2007	The Three Dumas	3rd Marquess Davy De La Pailleterie	Documentary	
2008	Wallander	Hugo Sandin	Episode: Sidetracked	
2013	Doctors	Father Finbar Flynn	Episode: Telling	

=== Documentary ===
Year	Title	Role	Notes
1975	One Million Hours		Drama documentary
1981	More British than the British	Narrator	
1987	Surcouf: Diving to Disaster	Narrator	Drama documentary
1988	Affairs of the Hart	Narrator	
1990	Oceans of Wealth	Narrator	
1991	The Transmission of Roger Bacon	Roger Bacon	Drama documentary
1991	Tradecraft	Narrator	
2015	Incontrovertible	Narrator	Documentary
