= While the Sun Shines =

While the Sun Shines may refer to:

- While the Sun Shines (play), a 1943 play by Terence Rattigan
- While the Sun Shines (film), a 1947 British comedy film, based on the play
