= Brefni O'Rorke =

Irish actor (1889–1946)

- Born: William Francis Breffni O'Rorke; 26 June 1889; Dollymount, Clontarf, Dublin, Ireland
- Died: 11 November 1946 (aged 57); Hendon, Middlesex, England
- Other name: Brefni O'Rourke
- Occupation: Actor
- Years active: 1939–1946

Brefni O'Rorke (26 June 1889 – 11 November 1946) was an Irish actor, both on the stage and in movies.

== Early life ==
O'Rorke was born as William Francis Breffni O'Rorke at 2 Esplande Villas in Dollymount, Clontarf, Dublin on 26 June 1889, and baptised at Clontarf Parish Church on 1 August 1889. His father, Frederick O'Rorke, was a cork merchant, and his mother, Jane Caroline O'Rorke, née Morgan, was an actress. He had an older brother, Frederick, who was twelve years older than him.

== Career ==
O'Rorke began studying acting with his mother and made his professional début in 1912 at the Gaiety Theatre, Dublin in a production of Shaw's John Bull's Other Island. While still living in Dublin, he met and married in 1916 Alice Cole, a chorus-girl turned actress, who had divorced her first husband and immigrated from South Africa with her young son. Thus O'Rorke became the stepfather of Cyril Cusack. Other theatre roles included the title role in Finn Varra Maa (1917), a musical "pantomime" (or rather, light opera) written by Thomas Henry Nally with music by Geoffrey Molyneux Palmer.

In 1939 he appeared in several broadcasts in the new fledgling BBC television broadcast, including a play by Irish playwright Teresa Deevy called The King of Spain's Daughter, and produced by Denis Johnston.

== Partial filmography ==
- The Ghost of St. Michael's (1941) – Sergeant MacFarlane
- This Man Is Dangerous (1941) – Dr Crosbie
- Love on the Dole (1941) – Dole Officer (uncredited)
- Cottage to Let (1941) – Scottish Police Inspector (uncredited)
- Jeannie (1941) – Quarantine Officer
- The Black Sheep of Whitehall (1942) – Ministry receptionist (uncredited)
- Hatter’s Castle (1942) – Foyle
- The Missing Million (1942) – Coleman
- The Next of Kin (1942) – Brigadier Blunt
- The Day Will Dawn (1942) – Political journalist
- They Flew Alone (1942) – Mac
- Unpublished Story (1942) – Denton
- The First of the Few (1942) – Specialist
- Secret Mission (1942) – Father Jouvet
- Much Too Shy (1942) – Mr Somers
- King Arthur Was a Gentleman (1942) – Colonel Duncannon
- We'll Meet Again (1943) – Dr Drake
- Tomorrow We Live (1943) – Moreau
- The Flemish Farm (1943) – Minister
- Escape to Danger (1943) – Security Officer
- They Met in the Dark (1943) – Detective Inspector Burrows
- The Lamp Still Burns (1943) – Mr Lorrimer
- The Hundred Pound Window (1944) – Kennedy
- Tawny Pipit (1944) – Uncle Arthur
- It Happened One Sunday (1944) – Engineer
- Don't Take It to Heart (1944) – Lord Chaunduyt
- Men of Rochdale (1944) – Miles Ashworth
- Twilight Hour (1945) – Richard Melville
- They Were Sisters (1945) – Coroner
- Waltz Time (1945) – Emperor
- Perfect Strangers (1945) – Mr Hargrove
- Murder in Reverse (1945) – Sullivan
- The Rake's Progress (1945) – Bromhead
- The Voice Within (1945) – Sergeant Sullivan
- I See a Dark Stranger (1946) – Michael O'Callaghan
  posthumous complete:
- The Root of All Evil (1947) – Farnish
- Green Fingers (1947) – Coroner
- The Upturned Glass (1947) – Dr Farrell
- Jassy (1947) – Fielding, footman (uncredited) (final film role)

== Television ==
National Television started in October 1936, initially broadcast just two hours a day. The station stopped broadcasting at the start of the War, and didn't restart until 1946.

"Plays" (like everything else) could last just one hour maximum, but some were only 25 minutes long. Also, there was no recording possible, so any repeat was really a new broadcast (as in The Advantages of Paternity).

=== Dramas ===
•	The King of Spain's Daughter	(25 Feb 1939)
	Writer	Teresa Deevy
	Producer	Denis Johnston
	Annie Kinsella	Phyllis Ryan
	Peter Kinsella	Brefni O'Rorke
	Mrs Marks	Ann Clery
	Jim Harris	Patrick Boxill
	Roddy Mann	Tony Quinn

•	The Advantages of Paternity	(12 May 1939)
	A comedy by Horton Giddy.	
	Author	Horton Giddy
	Producer	Denis Johnston
	General Yagunin	Brefni O'Rorke
	Colonel Ilyitch	Frank Thornton-Bassett
	Brunov	Erik Chitty
	Orderly	Stuart Latham

•	Good Morning, Bill!	(4 Jun 1939)
	A comedy by P. G. Wodehouse.	
	Author	P. G. Wodehouse
	Producer	Royston Morley
	Bill	Peter Haddon
	Lord Tidmouth	Michael Shipley
	Sir Hugo Drake	Brefni O'Rorke

=== Others ===
•	Death at Newton-Stewart	(3 Feb 1939)
	A reconstruction of an unparalleled murder of the 'seventies [1870s], extracted from the records of the Ulster Assizes.	
	Producer	Denis Johnston
Brefni O'Rorke, Frank Thornton-Bassett, Una O'Connor, Godfrey Kenton, Rupert Siddons, Joan Frank, Millar Wilson, Alex McCrindle, Adrian Byrne, Ian Dawson, Maureen Moore, Nigel Fitzgerald, John Clifford, Robert Sansom, Charles Maunsell, Eric Noels, Clive Baxter

•	The Parnell Commission	(18 Jul 1939)
	A reconstruction of the famous forgery investigation of 1888–89	
	Producer	Denis Johnston
	Piggott	Eliot Makeham
	Sir Charles Russel	Felix Aylmer
	Parnell	Mark Dignam
	Attorney General	Wilfrid Walter
	Eye Witness	Brefni O'Rorke
	Mrs O'Shea	Olga Edwardes
	President of the Court	Graveley Edwards
	Timothy Harrington	Blake Giffard
	Doctor Maguire	Nigel Fitzgerald
	Henniker Heaton	Lionel Dymoke
	Frank Hugh O'Donnell	Harry Hutchinson
	Court Registrar	Leo McCabe
	Captain O'Shea	Charles Oliver
	Friend	Micheline Patton
	Servant at Eltham	Moya Devlin
	Solicitor's Clerk	Russell Hogarth
	Spanish Policeman	Rafael Terry
	Reporter; Houston's Voice	Kenneth Barton
	[Actor]	Jack Clifford
