= Great Day (1945 film) =

- Theatrical release poster
- Directed by: Lance Comfort
- Written by: John Davenport; Lesley Storm; Wolfgang Wilhelm
- Based on: Great Day by Lesley Storm
- Produced by: Victor Hanbury
- Starring: Eric Portman; Flora Robson; Sheila Sim; Isabel Jeans; Walter Fitzgerald; Philip Friend; Marjorie Rhodes
- Cinematography: Erwin Hillier
- Edited by: Sidney Stone
- Music by: William Alwyn
- Production company: Victor Hanbury Productions
- Distributed by: RKO Pictures
- Release dates: 13 April 1945 (Premiere-London); 30 October 1946 (U.S.)
- Running time: 80 minutes
- Country: United Kingdom
- Language: English

Great Day is a 1945 British drama film directed by Lance Comfort and starring Eric Portman and Flora Robson. It was written by John Davenport, Lesley Storm and Wolfgang Wilhelm based on the 1945 play of the same name by Storm.

== Plot ==
The small (fictional) English village of Denley is thrown into excitement by the impending 'surprise' visit of Eleanor Roosevelt. However, the family of the impoverished local squire, whose wife is the moving spirit of the local Women's Institute, is faced with several crises.

Margaret 'Meg' Ellis, their daughter, works as a Land Girl on a nearby farm. She is loved by the farm's owner, who is twice her age, but is reluctant to allow him to announce their engagement, as she is still being wooed by her former boyfriend, now an Army officer. The farmer's unmarried sister is openly bitter at the prospect of Meg becoming mistress of the property.

Captain John Ellis, her father, a decorated hero of the First World War and now a frustrated alcoholic, is arrested in a local pub for attempted theft of a ten shilling note to buy drinks. Released from custody later that evening, he cannot face the humiliation in his small community and wanders into the woods to commit suicide. His wife, realising what has happened, sends Margaret to talk to him. They convince him to face up to his problems and assure him that they love him. As Mrs Roosevelt arrives, John and his family take their place in the welcoming throng, with John proudly wearing his medal ribbons.

== Cast ==
- Eric Portman as Captain John Ellis
- Flora Robson as Mrs Liz Ellis
- Sheila Sim as Margaret Ellis
- Isabel Jeans as Lady Mott
- Walter Fitzgerald as Bob Tyndale
- Philip Friend as Geoffrey Winthrop
- Marjorie Rhodes as Nora Mumford
- Maire O'Neill as Bridget Walsh
- John Laurie as Scottish officer
- Kathleen Harrison as pub customer
- Leslie Dwyer as pub customer
- Margaret Withers as Jane Tyndale
- Beatrice Varley as Miss Tracy
- Irene Handl as tea stall lady
- Patricia Hayes as Mrs Beadle
- Jacqueline Clarke
- Norman Pierce
- Pauline Tennant
- John McLaren
- Joan Maud
- Ivor Barnard
- Valentine Dunn
- O. B. Clarence
- Jean Shepeard (as Jean Shepherd)
- David Ward
- Roy Malcolm

== Production ==
It was made at Denham Studios with location filming at various sites including Denham village. The film's sets were designed by the art director William C. Andrews. The film recorded a loss of £1,511.

== Reception ==
The Monthly Film Bulletin wrote: "Flora Robson's portrayal of the courageous, long-suffering wife is powerful, solid. Portman brings tremendous depth and breadth to his picture of the neurotic introvert, hangover from the last war. Perhaps Portman's success is his failure. It is hard to reconcile the spiritual intensity of which this man was capable with his demonstrated moral bankruptcy. Nevertheless here are two performances in the English tradition at its best, and they are backed up by a highly competent supporting cast."

Kine Weekly wrote: "Eric Portman gives a good show as the embittered Ellis. Flora Robson evokes sympathy as Mrs. Ellis, and Sheila Sim is a refreshing Meg. Isabel Jeans, Walter Fitzgerald, Philip Friend, Margaret Withers and Marie O'Neil also do well. ... The play has exceedingly good atmosphere and detail – the well-drawn and skilfully shuffled characters form an integral part of the tapestry of the English village around which the plot revolves – but its documentary technique prevents it from hitting many emotional highspots. A friendly country conversation piece, it contains much humour and no little humanity."

Variety wrote: "This story of Eleanor Roosevelt's visit to an English village had scant success as a legit play. This film version has much to commend it yet is not wholly satisfying. ... Sheila Sim is fresh and natural as his young daughter ... Flora Robson and Eric Portman are excellent as the unhappy parents, disillusioned products of the war's aftermath. Many of the amusing and pathetic side issues of the story have been omitted on the screen, but most of the odd assortment of characters are there to give local color. Picturesque country scenes are given full treatment by the camera. Makes for pleasing entertainment of the second-feature class."
