= Creatures of Circumstance =

Short story collection by W Somerset Maugham

- First US edition
- Author: William Somerset Maugham
- Language: English
- Publisher: William Heinemann (UK); Doubleday Doran (US)
- Publication date: 1947
- Publication place: United Kingdom
- Media type: Print
- OCLC: 2494057

Creatures of Circumstance is a collection of 15 short stories by the British writer W. Somerset Maugham, first published by William Heinemann in 1947. It was the last collection of stories prepared by the writer.

In his introduction, Maugham writes, "Some of these stories were written long ago, but I have left them as they were, for I did not think I could make them more readable by bringing them up to date... one story was written during the war and others since its close. They have all been published in magazines."

== The stories ==
=== "The Colonel's Lady" ===
Evie is the wife of George Peregrine, a country gentleman and retired colonel; she publishes a book of poetry, which unexpectedly becomes successful. Readers of the book, including the colonel, realize that the poems describe a passionate affair that ended long ago. This embarrasses the colonel; however his solicitor advises him to do nothing. (This was one of the stories by Maugham dramatized in the film Quartet.)

=== "Flotsam and Jetsam" ===
Norman Grange, an impoverished rubber planter in a remote setting in Borneo, reluctantly looks after anthropologist Skelton who is recovering from malaria. Grange's wife is a former actress from Britain whose theatre company went bankrupt in Malaya. She hates her husband and the location, but it is impossible to leave. While Skelton is there she tells him her background and about her unhappiness, but not about her love affair with a visiting rubber company manager, whom Grange murdered.

=== "Appearance and Reality" ===
In Paris, Monsieur Le Sueur, a Senator and businessman, attends a fashion show with his wife, and sees Lissette Larion, a model; he establishes her as his mistress, providing her with an apartment. Later when Le Sueur has become a Minister, he discovers Lissette has a boyfriend. He agrees to her marrying the boyfriend, since it is appropriate for a Minister's mistress to be a respectable married woman.

=== "The Mother" ===
In Macarena, Seville, a woman known as La Cachirra, having served a prison sentence for murder, comes to the neighbourhood; her fierce, unsociable temperament intrigues the neighbours. She loves her son Currito, who regularly visits, and is jealous of his interest in Rosalia, a local girl. When Rosalia tells her she and Currito intend to get married, La Cachirra stabs her.

=== "Sanatorium" ===
Ashenden, staying for a while at a sanatorium in the north of Scotland, which treats patients with tuberculosis, encounters other patients: Campbell and McLeod, who have been there for years, enjoy hating each other; when McLeod dies, Campbell becomes depressed. As a consequence of McLeod's death, Major Templeton decides to make the most of his remaining months of life by marrying Ivy Bishop, who has a little longer to live. (This was one of the stories by Maugham dramatized in the film Trio.)

=== "A Woman of Fifty" ===
In a university in America, the narrator meets Laura Greene, the wife of an academic; remembering that he saw her years earlier in Italy, he recollects her history: She married Tito, son of an impoverished count who lived in a crumbling villa near Florence. Tito, suspecting an affair between Laura and his father, killed him. So that Tito would not be found guilty of premeditated murder, which would mean solitary confinement for life, Laura declared at his trial that his father had been her lover.

=== "The Romantic Young Lady" ===
In Seville, the Duchess de Dos Palos reluctantly sees the Countess de Marbella, the cleverest woman in Seville, to try and prevent her daughter marrying the Countess's coachman. The Countess subsequently sees her coachman, telling him he must choose between his job or marriage. The coachman decides to remain as the Countess's coachman, saying, "a place like this is found only once in a lifetime."

=== "A Casual Affair" ===
Jack Almond, an opium addict found dead in a town in Malaya, leaves a parcel of letters to be returned to Lady Kastellan in London. They relate to their love affair, when he worked in the Foreign Office. Lord Kastellan brought the affair to an end, and Almond got a job with a shipping company in the far east. He remained in good spirits until, when meeting Lady Kastellan a few years later, he realized that the affair had meant little to her.

=== "The Point of Honour" ===
In Seville, the narrator meets an aristocrat who, finding that he has been reading the play El médico de su honra by Calderón, tells him a similar story: Don Pedro Aguria, an aristocrat, marries Soledad, whom he loves, although she does not love him. Pepe Alvarez, who was once engaged to Soledad, arrives from overseas; their relationship has ended, but Don Pedro is obliged to kill Alvarez if Soledad ever meets him again. Circumstances suggest, wrongly, that they do meet, and Don Pedro kills Alvarez in a duel. The narrator wonders if the unhappy-looking wife of the storyteller is Soledad.

=== "Winter Cruise" ===
The Friedrich Weber, a German freighter which carries a few passengers as well as freight, is in the Caribbean, and Miss Reid, an English teashop owner, is the only passenger. The crew find her an intolerable bore, and, deciding that she needs a lover, they choose the radio-operator: he delivers a message to her saying he loves her. Miss Reid is thoughtful and quiet for the rest of the cruise. (This was one of the stories by Maugham dramatized in the film Encore.)

=== "The Happy Couple" ===
At Saint-Jean-Cap-Ferrat (Maugham's home in later years), the narrator attends a dinner party given by a neighbour, who has invited Mr and Mrs Craig, a couple who live next door to her. The narrator brings his acquaintance Sir Edward Landon, an English judge. The Craigs are terrified of Landon, and leave the area the next day. He later tells the narrator that the Craigs appeared before him years ago accused of murder; he was sure they were guilty and expected to sentence them to hang, but the jury found them not guilty.

=== "A Man from Glasgow" ===
In Algeciras, a port in Spain, the narrator meets a man from Glasgow, in the olive trade, who is anxious to leave the country. He relates his experience at an olive estate in Écija, where he repeatedly heard ghostly laughter from a nearby house. A madman died there years before and no one had lived there since then. He continued to hear the laughter when he moved to Seville, sixty miles away.

=== "The Unconquered" ===
In occupied France during the Second World War, two German soldiers stationed at Soissons ask the way at a nearby farm; they get drunk on the farmer's wine and one of them, Hans, rapes Annette, his daughter. Hans afterwards visits the farm whenever he can and, bringing much-needed food, gets on friendly terms with the farmer and his wife. Annette, who becomes pregnant, is defiantly opposed to Hans.

=== "Episode" ===
In Brixton in London, postman Fred Manson and Gracie Carter, daughter of a draper, fall passionately in love. When it is found that the money he spends on her was stolen from letters, he goes to prison. They intend to get married after the eighteen-month sentence, despite the opposition of Gracie's father, and they continue to think passionately about each other. Near the end of the prison sentence, Fred becomes uninterested in Gracie, and she kills herself.

=== "The Kite" ===
Herbert Sunbury, a young man living in a London suburb with his parents, likes to fly a kite on a Saturday afternoon. He marries Betty and they live in rented rooms. She disapproves of his kite-flying and tells him to go; he moves back to his parents, but continues to pay for her support. When she smashes his kite, which is a new, expensive model, he refuses to continue the regular payments, and so is sent to prison. (This was one of the stories by Maugham dramatized in the film Quartet).
