= Barbara White (actress) =

British actress (1923–2013)

- Born: 11 December 1923; Sheerness, Kent, England
- Died: 6 February 2013 (aged 89); Oakham, Rutland, England
- Occupation: Actress
- Years active: 1944–1950 (film & TV)
- Spouse: Kieron Moore (m. 1947)
- Children: Theresa (Soeur Miriame-Therese), Casey, Colm, Seán

Barbara White (11 December 1923 – 6 February 2013) was a British actress. She played several leading roles during a brief film career during the 1940s. She also appeared on stage in Lesley Storm's Great Day amongst others.

== Life ==
From the age of ten, White viewed a future career as a concert pianist, but it was identified the hands of the 'pocket Venus' could not stretch to the required keys. Instead she then began training at a dramatic school ran by her aunt. In the 1948 movie This Was a Woman, Russian-born composer Mischa Spoliansky (1898–1985) wrote a concerto especially for White to play, additional to several other compositions she played in the film.

White was described as 5 feet 1.5 inches (1.562 m), dark curly hair, and brown eyes.

As part of stage superstition, White stated in 1947 that she wore an ankle bracelet of tiny silver hearts, a token from an RAF officer who had been shot down in World War II over Germany. She owned a black spaniel called 'Notchka'.

Working with the J. Arthur Rank film studio, it was reported she received the biggest fan mail from Australia for a female actor.

On 4 December 1947 at St Patrick's Church, Soho Square, London, she married the Irish actor Kieron Moore (1924–2007) whom she acted with in The Voice Within (1946) and Mine Own Executioner (1947). The reception was in the Savoy Hotel. They went on to have a daughter and three sons. Her husband retired from acting in 1994 and they moved to France. He died in 2007 while White died in 2013.

== Selected filmography ==
- It Happened One Sunday (1944), as Irish servant girl Moya Malone
- The Voice Within (1946), as Kathleen
- Quiet Weekend (1946), as nearly 18-year-old house guest Miranda Bute
- While the Sun Shines (1947), as Lady Elisabeth Randall
- Mine Own Executioner (1947), as Molly Lucian, where Moore played her on-screen husband
- This Was a Woman (1948), as Fenella Russell

== Bibliography ==
- Goble, Alan. The Complete Index to Literary Sources in Film. Walter de Gruyter, 1999.
- Wearing, J. P. The London Stage 1940-1949: A Calendar of Productions, Performers, and Personnel. Rowman & Littlefield, 2014.
