= Mary Hinton (actress) =

British actress (1896–1979)

The Honourable Mary Hinton
- Born: Emily Rachel Forster; 17 February 1896; Chelsea, London, United Kingdom
- Died: 5 February 1979 (aged 82); Exbury, Hampshire, United Kingdom
- Occupation: Actress
- Years active: 1934–1968 (film & TV)
- Spouse: George Pitt-Rivers (m. 1915; div. 1930)
- Children: Michael Pitt-Rivers; Julian Pitt-Rivers
- Parent(s): Henry Forster, 1st Baron Forster; Rachel Cecily Douglas-Scott-Montagu

Mary Hinton (17 February, 1896–5 February, 1979) was a British stage, film and television actress. She was born as Emily Rachel Forster to the politician Henry Forster, 1st Baron Forster and the Honourable Rachel Cecily Douglas-Scott-Montagu, daughter of Henry Douglas-Scott-Montagu, 1st Baron Montagu of Beaulieu. She was a great-granddaughter of Walter Montagu Douglas Scott, 5th Duke of Buccleuch. Hinton became a regular British character actor for several decades. In the West End she appeared in Wilfrid Grantham's Mary Tudor (1935), Rose Franken's Claudia (1942) and Lesley Storm's Great Day (1945).

She was married to George Pitt-Rivers from 1915 to 1930 and had two sons Michael Pitt-Rivers and Julian Pitt-Rivers.

== Selected filmography ==
=== Film ===
- Once in a New Moon (1934)
- Poison Pen (1939)
- Gaslight (1940)
- Penn of Pennsylvania (1941)
- Hatter's Castle (1942)
- Women Aren't Angels (1943)
- Broken Journey (1948)
- Quartet (1948)
- The Winslow Boy (1948)
- It's Not Cricket (1949)
- Trottie True (1949)
- Her Favourite Husband (1950)
- White Corridors (1951)
- Something Money Can't Buy (1952)
- The Second Mrs Tanqueray (1952)
- The Village (1953)
- Always a Bride (1953)

=== Television ===
- Dixon of Dock Green (1958, 2 episodes)
- Hancock's Half Hour (1959, 1 episode)
- Emergency Ward 10 (1960, 3 episodes)
- Probation Officer (1961, 2 episodes)
- Dr. Finlay's Casebook (1963, 1 episode)
- Swizzlewick (1964, 6 episodes)
- The World of Wooster (1966, 1 episode)
- Out of the Unknown (1966, 1 episode)
- David Copperfield (1966, 3 episodes)

== Yachtswoman ==
She was a keen yachtswoman, owning the cutter Foxhound, and participating in the 1956 Newport Bermuda Race, as the only lady skipper.

She was the first female Flag Officer of the Royal Ocean Racing Club.

== Bibliography ==
- McFarlane, Brian . Lance Comfort. Manchester University Press, 2019.
- Wearing, J.P. The London Stage 1940-1949: A Calendar of Productions, Performers, and Personnel. Rowman & Littlefield, 2014.
