= Quartet (1948 film) =

1948 British anthology film

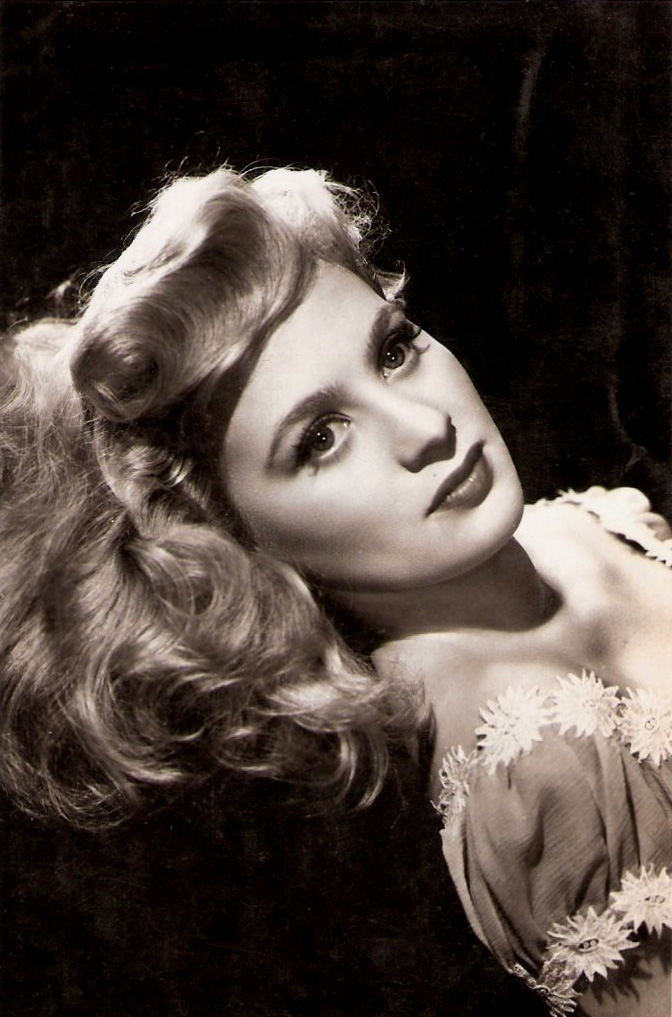
- Mai Zetterling from a promotional postcard for the film
- Directed by: Ken Annakin; Arthur Crabtree; Harold French; Ralph Smart
- Written by: R. C. Sherriff
- Based on: Stories by W. Somerset Maugham
- Produced by: Antony Darnborough
- Starring: Hermione Baddeley; Dirk Bogarde; Mervyn Johns; Cecil Parker; Basil Radford; Françoise Rosay; Susan Shaw; Linden Travers; Naunton Wayne; Mai Zetterling
- Music by: John Greenwood
- Production companies: Gainsborough Pictures; J. Arthur Rank Productions
- Distributed by: General Film Distributors
- Release date: 26 October 1948
- Running time: 120 minutes
- Country: United Kingdom
- Language: English
- Budget: £168,000 or £163,000
- Box office: £122,000 (by 1953) (UK) $800,000 (US)

Quartet is a 1948 British anthology film with four segments, each based on a story by W. Somerset Maugham. The author appears at the start and end of the movie to introduce the stories and comment about his writing career. It was successful enough to produce two sequels, Trio (1950) and Encore (1951), and popularised the compendium film format, leading to films such as O. Henry's Full House in 1952. The screenplays for the stories were all written by R. C. Sherriff.

== The Facts of Life ==
Based on "The Facts of Life", included in the 1940 collection of W. Somerset Maugham stories The Mixture as Before.

- Director: Ralph Smart
- Cinematographer: Ray Elton

=== Cast ===
- Basil Radford as Henry Garnet
- Naunton Wayne as Leslie
- Mai Zetterling as Jeanne
- Angela Baddeley as Mrs. Garnet
- Jack Watling as Nicky Garnet
- Nigel Buchanan as John
- James Robertson Justice as Branksome
- Ian Fleming as Ralph
- Jack Raine as Thomas
- Jean Cavall as Cabaret Artist

=== Plot ===
Despite their reservations, Henry Garnet and his wife allow their promising tennis player son, nineteen-year-old Nicky Garnet, to travel by himself to Monte Carlo to compete in a tournament. Mr. Garnet gives him some advice: never gamble, never lend money, and don't have anything to do with women. On the last night of his stay, he disregards all three: he wins a large amount of money at roulette and meets a beautiful woman named Jeanne, who borrows from him before he can react. Later, she repays him, then takes him dancing at a nightclub.

It is so late, his hotel has closed for the night. She offers to let him sleep on her sofa. Later that night, he awakens to find her stealing his winnings. He pretends to be asleep and sees her hide the money in a vase. After she leaves, he retrieves the money. The next morning, on the plane returning home, he counts his money and finds there is more than there should be. A friend suggests that Jeanne had stored her own funds in the same hiding place.

Upon his return home, Henry laments to his friends that Nicky ignored everything he had told him and profited from it.

== The Alien Corn ==
- Director: Harold French
- Cinematographer: Ray Elton

=== Cast ===
- Dirk Bogarde as George Bland
- Françoise Rosay as Lea Markart
- Honor Blackman as Paula
- Irene Browne as Lady Bland
- Raymond Lovell as Sir Frederick Bland
- George Thorpe as Uncle John
- Mary Hinton as Aunt Maud
- Maurice Denham as Coroner
- James Hayter as Foreman of the Jury

=== Plot ===
On George Bland's twenty-first birthday, his father Sir Frederick, of the landed gentry, asks him what he intends to do with his life. George's answer is incomprehensible to his entire family: he wants to become a concert pianist. His family, who want him to succeed to his father's place and title, try to talk him out of it. Finally, his cousin Paula (who is in love with him) comes up with a compromise: he will study in Paris for two years, after which an impartial expert will determine whether he has it in him to reach his goal.

The two years ended, Paula gets Lea Markart, a world-famous pianist, to do the judging. After listening to George's recital, Markart tells him that, while his technique is excellent, he lacks the talent and inspiration of a true artist and could never be more than a good amateur.

George is killed later that day with a blast to the chest from a gun he was supposedly cleaning. His family is anxious that his death be ruled accidental, and, at the inquest, the coroner's jury returns such a verdict with clear consciences, since, in the words of the plainspoken foreman, the jurors cannot accept that a gentleman such as the deceased would have killed himself "just 'cause he couldn't play piano good".

== The Kite ==
Based on "The Kite", included in the 1947 collection of Maugham stories Creatures of Circumstance.

- Director: Arthur Crabtree
- Cinematographer: Ray Elton

=== Cast ===
- Hermione Baddeley as Beatrice Sunbury
- Mervyn Johns as Samuel Sunbury
- Susan Shaw as Betty Sunbury
- George Cole as Herbert Sunbury
  - David Cole as Young Herbert Sunbury
- Cyril Chamberlain as Reporter
- Bernard Lee as Prison Visitor
- Frederick Leister as Prison Governor
- George Merritt as Prison Officer

=== Plot ===
Herbert Sunbury marries Betty, despite his overly involved mother Beatrice's dislike for the woman. The newlyweds are happy, except for Herbert's lifelong enthusiasm for flying kites. Herbert and his father Samuel had designed and flown their creations every Saturday on the common since Herbert was a young lad. Betty considers it childish, so to appease her, Herbert reluctantly promises to give it up. However, the lure of his latest, giant, unflown kite proves too great for him. When Betty finds out, they have a fight and Herbert moves back in with his parents, much to Beatrice's delight.

Betty has second thoughts and tries to make up with Herbert, but he refuses to go home with her. Out of anger, she destroys his new kite. Aghast, Herbert angrily refuses to give her any further financial support and is put in prison as a result. A prison visitor is told his curious story. He arranges for Herbert to be released and advises Betty on how to save her marriage. When Herbert goes to the common, he discovers Betty there flying a kite.

== The Colonel's Lady ==
Based on "The Colonel's Lady", included in the 1947 collection of Maugham stories Creatures of Circumstance.

- Director: Ken Annakin
- Cinematographer: Reg Wyer

=== Cast ===
- Cecil Parker as Colonel George Peregrine
- Linden Travers as Daphne
- Felix Aylmer as Martin
- Henry Edwards as Duke of Heverel
- Nora Swinburne as Evie Peregrine
- Ernest Thesiger as Henry Dashwood
- Yvonne Owen as 1st Gossip
- Cyril Raymond as Railway Passenger
- Claude Allister as 1st Clubman
- Ernest Butcher as Blane's Clerk
- Lyn Evans as Bannock
- Wilfred Hyde-White as 2nd Clubman
- Clive Morton as Henry Blane
- Hal Osmond as Bookshop Assistant
- J. H. Roberts as West
- John Salew as John Coleman
- Margaret Withers as 2nd Gossip

=== Plot ===
Colonel George Peregrine's mousy wife Evie writes a book of poetry under a pseudonym, but is immediately unmasked by the papers. George does not read the poetry (although he says he has) and is surprised when a friend says it is "not suitable for children". Another friend says it has "naked, earthy passion", and compares it to Sappho. The book is a success and sells "like hot-cakes", becoming the talk of the town. Even the colonel's mistress Daphne has an interest in it.

After listening to much talk about how "sexy" the book is, George finally asks Daphne to borrow her copy, then insists she tell him about it. The book is about a middle-aged woman falling in love with, and having an affair with, a younger man, told in the first person. After a torrid affair, the younger man dies. Daphne says it is so vivid that it must be based on a real experience, but George insists Evie is "too much of a lady", and that it must be fiction. Still, he is tortured by the insinuation that it could be true but is too afraid to ask Evie about it.

Eventually, of course, sensing George's unease, Evie tells him the passion was based on his love for her, as it was when they were young. She blames herself for the "death" of that love. They end in an embrace.

== Production ==
Ken Annakin says Sydney Box asked which of W. Somerset Maugham's four stories he wanted to direct and Annakin chose "The Colonel's Lady". He enjoyed making the film a lot and says he adjusted some of R. C. Sherriff's script to put back in Maugham's original dialogue.
