= Great Day (play) =

1945 play

- Written by: Lesley Storm
- Original language: English
- Genre: Drama

Premiere
- Date premiered: 14 March 1945
- Place premiered: Playhouse Theatre, London

Great Day is a 1945 play by the British writer Lesley Storm. It portrays the excitement generated in an English village by the upcoming visit of American First Lady Eleanor Roosevelt.

The play ran for 29 performances at the Playhouse Theatre in London's West End. The original cast included Edgar Norfolk, George Selway, Avice Landone, Mary Hinton, Elsie Randolph, Irene Handl, Barbara White, Olga Lindo and Winifred Evans.

The same year it was adapted into a film of the same title directed by Lance Comfort and featuring Flora Robson and Eric Portman.

== Bibliography ==
- Goble, Alan. The Complete Index to Literary Sources in Film. Walter de Gruyter, 1999.
- Wearing, J.P. The London Stage 1940-1949: A Calendar of Productions, Performers, and Personnel. Rowman & Littlefield, 2014.
