= The Mixture as Before =

1940 collection of short stories by W. Somerset Maugham

- First edition (UK)
- Author: William Somerset Maugham
- Language: English
- Publisher: William Heinemann (UK); Doubleday Doran (US)
- Publication date: 1940
- Publication place: United Kingdom
- Media type: Print
- OCLC: 1535145

The Mixture as Before is a collection of 10 short stories by the British writer W. Somerset Maugham, first published by William Heinemann in 1940.

In the foreword, Maugham writes, "When my last volume of short stories was published The Times headed their review of it with the title The Mixture as Before. This of course was meant in a depreciatory sense, but I did not take it as such.... The writer has his special communication to make.... [I]f there is in his personality a certain abundance he may continue for a long time to produce work which is varied and characteristic; but the time comes at last... when, having given what he has to give, his powers seem to fail.... He must be content, he must rejoice even, if a new work... shows no falling off; if, in fact, it can truthfully be called The Mixture as Before."

== The stories ==
=== "The Three Fat Women of Antibes" ===
Arrow, Beatrice and Frank, intent on losing weight, stay at Antibes on the French Riviera. They are on a strict diet. They like to play bridge, and Frank invites her friend Lena to make four at bridge. Lena's liking for fattening food causes tension among the other three. After she leaves, Beatrice, having had to watch Lena eating for a fortnight, gives in and starts eating the same; the others follow suit.

=== "A Man with a Conscience" ===
In Saint-Laurent-du-Maroni, a penal colony in French Guiana, the narrator is interested in Jean Charvin, convicted of murdering his wife, now working in the colony's accounts department, and learns hs story. In Le Havre in France, Jean and his friend Henri Renard both loved Marie-Louise; Jean had a job, but Henri did not. When Jean's boss, who was considering Henri for a job, asked him if his friend was honest, his false reaction made the company reject Henri, who went to the Far East to work for a silk firm, while Jean married Marie-Louise. Henri subsequently died. Jean began to dislike his wife and, tortured by remorse about Henri, eventually gave way to a violent act against her.

=== "The Treasure" ===
Richard Harenger, working in the Home Office in London, moves to a flat near Whitehall after he separates from his wife. Requiring a parlourmaid, he hires Pritchard, who turns out to be a perfect servant. One evening, when he decides to go to the cinema, he thinks it would be kind to ask Pritchard, who has nothing to do on her evening off, to come with him. They have dinner afterwards and dance. Back at the flat, happy that he has been kind to Pritchard, he kisses her, which turns into passion. The next morning he reproaches himself for being a fool, but is relieved to find that she has resumed her work as if nothing had happened.

=== "The Lotus Eater" ===
On Capri, the narrator meets Thomas Wilson, who tells his story: He was formerly a bank manager in England, and fell in love with the island while on holiday. His wife and child having died, he decided to live on Capri, and, aged 35, bought an annuity for 25 years. He has ten years left, then he will kill himself. The narrator, returning many years later, learns that Wilson, after putting off the act until he could not get credit, eventually made an attempt to kill himself which affected his mental state; he is living in reduced circumstances and avoids people, "like a hunted animal".

=== "The Lion's Skin" ===
Captain Robert Forestier and his American wife Eleanor, who met during the First World War in France when he was wounded and she was a nurse, live on the French Riviera. Aware of her husband's aristocratic ancestry, she regards him as a perfect English gentleman. He tells her to avoid their neighbour Sir Frederick Hardy, whom he regards as disreputable. Sir Frederick, meeting Forestier in a bar, says he remembers seeing him as a car-washer in a garage just before the war. When the Forestiers' house catches fire, Forestier dies trying to save a dog trapped inside: "No longer knowing the difference between sham and real, he had sacrificed his life to a spurious heroism."

=== "Lord Mountdrago" ===
Lord Mountdrago, Secretary for Foreign Affairs in the government, sees Dr. Audlin, a psycho-analyst in Wimpole Street, London. He describes dreams which prevent him from working, in which he humiliates himself in the presence of Owen Griffiths, a Labour MP from Wales. In the real world, Griffiths seems to know about these dreams. Once, in a dream, Mountdrago hit him on the head, and the real Griffiths complained of a headache: he fears he might kill him in a dream, causing the real Griffiths to die. He admits that he despises Griffiths and has ruined his career by ridiculing his speech in Parliament. Audlin later learns that Mountdrago has died by seemingly falling onto railway lines at a tube station, and that Grffiths has been found dead. (This story was dramatized in the film Three Cases of Murder.)

=== "Gigolo and Gigolette" ===
Syd Cotman, a cockney, worked as a dancing gigolo in hotels in France until the slump came; he married Stella, a swimming instructress; they took part in dance marathons. Now they are at a casino on the French Riviera, drawing customers: Stella dives sixty feet into a tank of water five feet deep, flames coming from petrol on the surface. Customers come to see if she will kill herself. She hates doing this and tells Syd she wants to stop; he acquiesces, since he loves her, although they might starve. But she gets ready for the next dive. (This was one of the stories by Maugham dramatized in the film Encore.)

=== "The Voice of the Turtle" ===
The narrator, a novelist, is interested in the first novel of young author Peter Melrose. Staying with the narrator on the French Riviera while he looks for a pension, Melrose describes an imaginary prima donna who will be the subject of his next novel. The narrator, thinking it an idealistic portrait, invites to dinner a real prima donna, La Falterona, whom he thinks is unintelligent and self-centred, in order to disillusion Melrose. Afterwards, Melrose says she is just as he imagined his character. After the novel is published, La Falterona is furious with the narrator for letting her be the subject of Melrose's novel.

=== "An Official Position" ===
Louis Remire is a former policeman serving a sentence, for murdering his wife, in Saint-Laurent-du-Maroni, a penal colony in French Guiana. He is the public executioner at the prison and has his own house. He is hated by the freed convicts still living in the colony. They murdered his predecessor, deceived by a seduction; Remire, no longer interested in women, and protected by his two dogs, feels safe. After a contented afternoon fishing, he goes to the prison at midnight in order to move the guillotine to the prison yard. On the way there he realizes his dogs have been killed; he is surrounded and stabbed to death.

=== "The Facts of Life" ===
Nicky Garnet, aged eighteen, is a promising tennis-player; before he goes to Monte Carlo for a tournament, his father, a London stockbroker, tells him not to gamble, not to lend anyone money, and to avoid women. After the tournament in Monte Carlo Nicky tries playing roulette and wins a lot of money; he lends money to a woman and she returns it; he is seduced by this woman but is able to retrieve the money she steals from him. His father is infuriated that he has been made to look foolish because Nicky has successfully ignored his advice. (This was one of the stories by Maugham dramatized in the film Quartet.)
