= Roland Culver =

English actor (1900–1984)

Roland Culver OBE
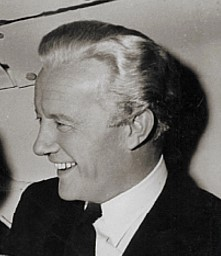
- Culver in 1947
- Born: Roland Joseph Culver; 31 August 1900; Highgate, London, England
- Died: 1 March 1984 (aged 83); Henley-on-Thames, Oxfordshire, England
- Occupation: Actor
- Years active: 1924–1983
- Spouses: Daphne Rye (m. 1938; div. 1946) Nan Hopkins (m. 1947)
- Children: 2, including Michael

Roland Joseph Culver, OBE (31 August 1900 – 1 March 1984) was an English stage, film, and television actor.

== Early life ==
After Highgate School, Culver joined the Royal Air Force and served as a pilot from 1918 to 1919.

== Career ==
After considering other careers, Culver turned to acting, graduating from the Royal Academy of Dramatic Art. He debuted on the stage in 1924 at Hull Repertory Theatre and, by 1931, was appearing in films in which he was known for his portrayals of impeccable English gentlemen not given to displays of emotion. He played Algernon in a 1953 sound recording of The Importance of Being Earnest; the all-star cast also included John Gielgud as Jack, Edith Evans as Lady Bracknell, Celia Johnson as Cecily and Pamela Brown as Gwendolen.

In the 1960s Culver branched out into television, before finally retiring in 1983. In 1960 he appeared in Five Finger Exercise at the Music Box Theatre in New York City. He was nominated for the 1966 Tony Award for Best Performance by a Leading Actor in a Play for Ivanov. In 1974, he played the irascible Duke of Omnium and Gatherum in the popular BBC adaptation of The Pallisers. He took the role of Claudius opposite Paul Scofield's celebrated Hamlet in Howard Sackler's production for Caedmon Shakespeare Recordings in 1963.

== Personal life and death ==
Culver was married twice, first to actress, director, and casting agent Daphne Rye between 1932 and 1946, then to Nan Hopkins from 1947 until his death from a heart attack in 1984. With his first wife he had two children: actor Michael Culver and Robin Culver. He was awarded an OBE in the 1980 Birthday Honours for services to drama.

== Writer ==
Culver wrote the play A River Breeze, and his autobiography is called Not Quite a Gentleman.

== Complete filmography ==
Year	Title	Role	Notes
1931	77 Park Lane	Sir Richard Carrington	
1931	Fascination	Ronnie	
1932	A Voice Said Goodnight	Reporter	Short
1932	Flat No. 9		Short, Uncredited
1932	Love on Wheels	Salesman	
1932	COD	Edward	
1932	There Goes the Bride	Jacques	
1932	Her First Affaire	Drunk	
1932	Marry Me	Tailor	Uncredited
1933	Head of the Family	Manny	
1933	Mayfair Girl	Dick Porter	
1933	Puppets of Fate	Billy Oakhurst	
1933	Her Imaginary Lover	Raleigh Raleigh	
1934	Lucky Loser	Pat Hayden	
1934	Two Hearts in Waltz Time	Freddie	
1934	Nell Gwyn		Uncredited
1934	Father and Son	Vincent	
1934	The Scoop	Barney Somers	
1934	Borrow a Million	Charles Nutford	
1935	Oh, What a Night		Uncredited
1936	Everybody Dance	Mr. Wilson – Diner at nightclub	Uncredited
1936	Crime Over London	Soap Salesman	
1936	Accused	Henry Capelle	
1937	Jump for Glory	Conductor	
1937	Paradise for Two	Paul Duval	
1939	Blind Folly	Ford	
1940	French Without Tears	Cmdr. Bill Rogers	
1940	Dangerous Comment	Officer	Short
1940	Girl in the News	Police Inspector	Uncredited
1940	Night Train to Munich	Roberts	
1941	Old Bill and Son	Colonel	
1941	Fingers	Hugo Allen	
1941	Quiet Wedding	Boofy Ponsonby	
1941	This England	Steward	
1942	One of Our Aircraft Is Missing	Naval Officer	
1942	The Day Will Dawn	Cmdr. Pittwaters	
1942	Unpublished Story	Stannard	
1942	The First of the Few	Commander Bride	
1942	Secret Mission	Captain Red Gowan	
1942	Talk About Jacqueline	Leslie Waddington	
1943	The Life and Death of Colonel Blimp	Colonel Betteridge	
1943	Dear Octopus	Felix Martin	
1944	On Approval	Richard Halton	
1944	English Without Tears	Sir Cosmo Brandon	
1944	Give Us the Moon	Ferdinand	
1945	Dead of Night	Eliot Foley	
1945	Perfect Strangers	Richard	
1946	To Each His Own	Lord Desham	
1946	Wanted for Murder	Chief Insp. Conway	
1947	Singapore	Michael Van Leyden	
1947	Down to Earth	Mr. Jordan	
1948	The Emperor Waltz	Baron Holenia	
1948	Isn't It Romantic?	Major Eucid Cameron	
1949	The Great Lover	Grand Duke Maximillian	
1950	Trio	Mr. Ashenden	Segment "Sanatorium"
1951	The Late Edwina Black	Inspector Martin	
1951	Hotel Sahara	Major Bill Randall	
1951	Encore	George Ramsay	Segment "The Ant and the Grasshopper"
1951	The Magic Box	1st Company Promoter	
1952	The Hour of 13	Connor	
1952	Folly to Be Wise	George Prout	
1953	The Holly and the Ivy	Lord B.	
1953	Rough Shoot	Randall	
1954	Betrayed	Gen. Warsleigh	
1954	The Teckman Mystery	Insp. Harris	
1955	Dangerous Comment	Officer	Short
1955	The Man Who Loved Redheads	Major Oscar Philipson	
1955	The Ship That Died of Shame	Fordyce	
1955	Touch and Go	Fairbright	
1955	An Alligator Named Daisy	Col. Geoffrey Weston	
1956	Safari	Sir Vincent Brampton	
1957	The Hypnotist	Doctor Francis Pelham	
1957	Light Fingers	Humphrey Levenham	
1957	The Vicious Circle	Detective Inspector Dane	
1957	The Truth About Women	Charles Tavistock	
1958	Bonjour Tristesse	Mr. Lombard	
1958	Next to No Time	Sir Godfrey Cowan	
1958	Rockets Galore!	Captain Wagget	
1962	A Pair of Briefs	Sir John Pilbright	
1962	Term of Trial	Trowman	
1962	The Iron Maiden	Lord Upshott	
1964	The Yellow Rolls-Royce	Norwood	
1965	Thunderball	Home Secretary	
1966	A Man Could Get Killed	Doctor Mathieson	
1969	In Search of Gregory	Wardle	
1969	The Magic Christian	Sir Herbert	Uncredited
1970	Fragment of Fear	Mr. Vellacot	
1970	The Rise and Rise of Michael Rimmer	Sir Eric Bentley	
1970	Uncle Vanya	Serebriakov	TV film
1972	To Encourage the Others	Lord Goddard	TV movie
1973	Bequest to the Nation	Lord Barham	
1973	The Legend of Hell House	Mr. (Rudolph) Deutsch	
1973	The Mackintosh Man	Judge	
1975	Lloyd George Knew My Father	General Sir William Boothroyd	TV movie
1976	No Longer Alone	A.E. Matthews	
1977	The Uncanny	Wallace	Segment "London 1912"
1978	The Greek Tycoon	Robert Keith	
1979	Saint Joan		TV movie
1980	Rough Cut	Mr. Lloyd Palmer	
1980	The Double Dealer	Saygrace	TV movie
1980	Never Never Land	Mr. Salford	
1982	The Hunchback of Notre Dame	Bishop of Paris	TV movie
1982	Britannia Hospital	General Wetherby	
1982	The Missionary	Lord Fermleigh	
