= The Way Things Go (play) =

1950 play by Frederick Lonsdale

The Way Things Go is a comedy play by the British writer Frederick Lonsdale. It ran for 155 performances at the Phoenix Theatre in the West End between 2 March and 15 July 1950. It was Lonsdale's final play, ending a career that stretched back to the Edwardian era. The original cast included Glynis Johns, Kenneth More, Ronald Squire and Michael Gough. It was subsequently staged at the Booth Theatre in New York the same year, but lasted for only twelve performances.

== Synopsis ==
A wealthy young American woman tries to lure an impoverished British duke into marriage.

== Bibliography ==
- Wearing, J.P. The London Stage 1950-1959: A Calendar of Productions, Performers, and Personnel. Rowman & Littlefield, 2014.
