= It Happened One Sunday =

1944 British film by Karel Lamač

- Directed by: Karel Lamač
- Written by: Paul Vincent Carroll; Frederic Gotfurt; Frank Harvey
- Based on: She Met Him One Sunday by Victor Skutezky
- Produced by: Frederic Gotfurt; Victor Skutezky
- Starring: Robert Beatty; Barbara White; Marjorie Rhodes
- Cinematography: Basil Emmott
- Edited by: Flora Newton
- Music by: Philip Green; Charles Williams
- Production company: Associated British Picture Corporation
- Distributed by: Associated British Picture Corporation
- Release date: 28 August 1944
- Running time: 97 minutes
- Country: United Kingdom
- Language: English

It Happened One Sunday is a 1944 British romantic comedy film directed by Karel Lamač and starring Robert Beatty, Barbara White and Marjorie Rhodes. It was written by Paul Vincent Carroll, Frederic Gotfurt and Frank Harvey based on the play She Met Him One Sunday by Victor Skutezky. Produced and distributed by Associated British it was shot at Welwyn Studios with sets designed by the art director William C. Andrews.

== Synopsis ==
In the film, an Irish servant girl working in Liverpool mistakenly believes that she has a secret admirer working at a hospital, and while seeking him out accidentally meets and falls in love with a serviceman there. She spends the rest of the day around Liverpool with him and they eventually decide to marry.

== Cast ==
- Robert Beatty as Tom Stevens
- Barbara White as Moya Malone
- Marjorie Rhodes as Mrs. Buckland
- Ernest Butcher as Mr. Buckland
- Kathryn Beaumont as Jill Buckland
- Judy Kelly as Violet
- Irene Vanbrugh as Mrs. Bellamy
- Kathleen Harrison as Mrs. Purkiss
- Moore Marriott as porter
- C. V. France as magistrate
- Marie Ault as madame
- Brefni O'Rorke as engineer
- Frederick Piper as Jake
- Philip Green as bandleader

== Reception ==
The Monthly Film Bulletin wrote: "Tortuous in construction and slow-moving in the telling, this piece tries to eke out some interest by digressions into fantasy in which the little servant girl queens it over fine ladies and princes in eighteenth-century costumes. It is not a successful attempt. Despite poor material, however, Barbara White makes a success of her first screen appearance as the girl. Robert Beatty, as the rough Mr. Brown, gives the film its only contact with reality."

Kine Weekly called the film an "intriguing, down-to-earth yet refreshingly sentimental romantic melodrama" and "an impressive British film".
