= Abram Smythe Palmer =

British theologian, lexicographer and mythographer

Abram Smythe Palmer (1844 – 10 July 1917) was a doctor of divinity, lecturer at Trinity College Dublin, and enthusiastic lexicographer and mythographer.

For most of his life he was the vicar of Holy Trinity Church, South Woodford, today a north-eastern suburb of London. He was the father of the composer Geoffrey Molyneux Palmer.

== Müller's solar myth ==
Palmer re-issued Max Müller's Comparative Mythology (1856) in 1908, with an extensive introduction and annotations, stating that he noted "a reaction taking place in favour of the views advanced by Max Müller". Müller had introduced the "solar myth" school of thought, which interpreted the world's mythology in terms of a supposed prehistoric solar myth. Palmer included in his edition the "Oxford Solar Myth", an 1870 parody by R. F. Littledale, which "proved" that Max Müller was himself a solar divinity.

== Selected publications ==
Palmer's publications include:

- Leaves from a Word-Hunter's Note-Book, Being Some Contributions to English Etymology (1876)
- Folk-Etymology: A Dictionary of Verbal Corruptions or Words Perverted in Form or Meaning by False Derivation or Mistaken Analogy (1882)
- Babylonian Influence on the Bible and Popular Beliefs: "Tĕhôm and Tiâmat", "Hades and Satan": A Comparative Study of Genesis I. 2 (1897)
- Jacob at Bethel: The Vision, the Stone, the Anointing: An Essay in Comparative Religion (1899)
- The Folk and Their Word-Lore (1904)
- The Ideal of A Gentleman; or, A Mirror for Gentlefolks, A Portrayal in Literature from the Earliest Times (1908)
- The Samson-Saga and Its Place in Comparative Religion (1913)

== Bibliography ==
- Dorson, Richard Mercer (1999). History of British Folklore. Vol. 2. United Kingdom: Routledge. ISBN 9780415204774.
