= The Voice Within (film) =

1946 film

- Directed by: Maurice J. Wilson
- Written by: B. Charles-Deane; Stafford Dickens; Michael Goldsmith; Herbert Victor
- Produced by: Isadore Goldsmith
- Starring: Barbara White; Kieron Moore; Brefni O'Rorke
- Cinematography: Jan Sikorski
- Music by: John Bath
- Production company: Grafton Films
- Distributed by: Grand National Pictures
- Release date: 8 January 1946
- Running time: 74 minutes
- Country: United Kingdom
- Language: English

The Voice Within is a 1946 British second feature ('B') crime drama film directed by Maurice J. Wilson and starring Barbara White, Kieron Moore and Brefni O'Rorke. It was written by B. Charles-Deane, Stafford Dickens, Michael Goldsmith and Herbert Victor.

It was the film debut of Moore who went on to appear in several major roles over the following years. It was shot at the Riverside Studios in Hammersmith.

== Cast ==
- Barbara White as Kathleen
- Kieron Moore as Denis O'Shea
- Shaun Noble as Roy O'Shea
- Violet Farebrother as grandma
- Brefni O'Rorke as Sergeant Sullivan
- George Merritt as McDonnell
- Paul Merton as Constable Patrick O'Day
- Olive Sloane as fair owner's Wife
- Hay Petrie as fair owner
- Johnnie Schofield as lorry driver
- Philip Godfrey as elderly smuggler
- Norman Pierce as elderly smuggler
- Henry Wolston as Constable Rowley
- Jack Vyvyan as Constable O'Kelly
- Clifford Buckton as 1st I.R.A. man
- Charles Rolfe as 2nd I.R.A. man
- Frank Atkinson as farmer

== Reception ==
The Monthly Film Bulletin wrote: "This is an unsophisticated film with some pleasant photography. Kieron O'Hanrahan is quite good as Dennis, but the acting as a whole is not convincing enough to give strength and reality to the story."

Kine Weekly wrote: "The plot is, In many respects, unique, but untidy direction prevents it from getting quickly off the mark or ending on an exciting note. A clever performance by Viscount, the dog, and delightful scenery are its most conspicuous assets."

In British Sound Films: The Studio Years 1928–1959 David Quinlan rated the film as "mediocre", writing: "Indifferent film."
