= Daphne Rye =

British director, actress, casting director and restaurateur (1916–1992)

Daphne Rye (1916 – 10 November 1992) was a British director, actress, casting director and restaurateur.

Rye was casting agent for the company H. M. Tennent. She discovered a number of talents who became big names, including Richard Burton, later one of Rye's lodgers. She also helped Kenneth More and Honor Blackman. Nigel Hawthorne said of her: "How daunting it was to hear her voice coming from a darkened auditorium during auditions." Her theatrical credits as director included Private Lives, Edward, My Son and The Little Hut.

She was married three times. Her marriages to the actor Roland Culver and Dr John Janvrin were dissolved. Sam Ainley, her last husband, predeceased her. Rye had two sons from her first marriage, actor Michael Culver and painter Robin Culver.

In 1963, with the backing of friends, Rye established a restaurant in Chelsea called Daphne's, which became a celebrity hangout, attracting the likes of Laurence Olivier, David Niven, Alec Guinness and Prince Charles.

She died in Spain where she had spent much of her life.
