= Cyril Crowhurst =

British sound engineer (1906–1995)

- Born: Cyril Ernest Willy Crowhurst; 9 March 1906; Greenwich, London, England
- Died: 29 January 1995 (aged 88); Harrow, London, England
- Occupation: Sound engineer
- Years active: 1950-1966

Cyril Crowhurst (9 March 1906 – 29 January 1995) was a British sound engineer. He was nominated for an Academy Award in the category of Best Sound Recording for the film Trio.

== Selected filmography ==
- Trio (1950)
