= Marjorie Rhodes =

British actress (1897–1979)

- Born: Millicent Wise; 9 April 1897; Hull, East Riding of Yorkshire, England
- Died: 4 July 1979 (aged 82); Hove, Sussex, England
- Occupation: Actress
- Years active: 1938–1974

Marjorie Rhodes (9 April 1897 – 4 July 1979) was a British actress. She was born Millicent Wise in Hull, East Riding of Yorkshire.

== Career ==
One of her better-known roles was as Lucy Fitton, the mother in Bill Naughton's play All in Good Time. She played the role on Broadway, for which she was nominated for a Tony Award in 1965. She reprised the role in the 1966 film version, titled The Family Way. Steptoe and Son,"A Box In Town" 1963. She was featured singing a track "The World Is for the Young" with Stanley Holloway in the Herman's Hermits 1968 film Mrs. Brown, You've Got A Lovely Daughter.

Her television appearances included The Army Game (as Edith Snudge), The Adventures of William Tell episode "The Boy Slaves" (1958), Dixon of Dock Green (1961–1962), the episode "For the Girl Who Has Everything" of Randall and Hopkirk (Deceased) (1969), Doctor at Large (1971) and Z-Cars (1974).

== Selected filmography ==
- Poison Pen (1939) – Mrs. Scaife
- Just William (1940) – Cook (uncredited)
- Love on the Dole (1941) – Mrs. Bull
- The Black Sheep of Whitehall (1942) – Nurse (uncredited)
- Squadron Leader X (1943) – Mrs. Agnew
- When We Are Married (1943) – Mrs. Northrup
- Old Mother Riley Detective (1943) – Cook
- Theatre Royal (1943) – Agnes
- Escape to Danger (1943) – Mrs. Pickles
- The Butler's Dilemma (1943) – Mrs. Plumb
- On Approval (1944) – Cook
- Tawny Pipit (1944) – Mrs. Pickering
- It Happened One Sunday (1944) – Mrs. Buckland
- Great Day (1945) – Mrs. Nora Mumford
- School for Secrets (1946) – Mrs. Arnold
- Uncle Silas (1947) – Mrs. Rusk
- This Was a Woman (1948) – Mrs. Holmes
- Escape (1948) – Mrs. Pinkem
- Enchantment (1948) – Mrs. Sampson
- Private Angelo (1949) – Countess
- The Cure for Love (1949) – Mrs. Sarah Hardacre
- Time Gentlemen, Please! (1952) – Miss Mouncey
- Decameron Nights (1953) – Signora Bucca
- Those People Next Door (1953) – Mary Twigg
- The Yellow Balloon (1953) – Mrs. Stokes
- Street Corner (1953) – Mrs. Foster
- The Girl on the Pier (1953) – Mrs. Chubb
- The Weak and the Wicked (1953) – Suzie, bigamist inmate
- To Dorothy a Son (1954) – Landlady
- Children Galore (1955) – Ada Jones
- Footsteps in the Fog (1955) – Mrs. Park
- Room in the House (1955) – Betsy Richards
- It's a Great Day (1955) – Landlady
- Lost (1956) – Mrs. Jeffries
- Now and Forever (1956) – Farmer's wife Aggie
- Yield to the Night (1956) – Matron Brandon
- It's Great to Be Young (1956) – Landlady
- The Passionate Stranger (1957) – Mrs. Poldy
- There's Always a Thursday (1957) – Marjorie Potter
- The Good Companions (1957) – Mrs. Mounder
- Hell Drivers (1957) – Ma West
- No Time for Tears (1957) – Ethel
- After the Ball (1957) – Bessie
- Just My Luck (1957) – Mrs. Hackett
- The Naked Truth (1957) – Lady on Phone (uncredited)
- Gideon's Day (1958) – Mrs. Saparelli
- Alive and Kicking (1959) – Old Woman
- Watch It, Sailor! (1961) – Emma Hornett
- Over the Odds (1961) – Bridget Stone
- I've Gotta Horse (1965) – Mrs. Bartholemew
- Those Magnificent Men in Their Flying Machines (1965) – Waitress
- The Family Way (1966) – Lucy Fitton
- Mrs. Brown, You've Got a Lovely Daughter (1968) – Grandma Gloria Tulley
- Spring and Port Wine (1970) – Mrs. Gasket
- Hands of the Ripper (1971) – Mrs. Bryant
