= Antony Darnborough =

British film producer and director

Antony Darnborough (6 October 1913 – 24 September 2000) was a British film producer and director.

== Select Credits ==
- Quartet (1948)
- Traveller's Joy (1949)
- Boys in Brown (1949)
- The Astonished Heart (1950)
- So Long at the Fair (1950)
- Trio (1950)
- Encore (1951)
- To Paris with Love (1954)
- The Baby and the Battleship (1956)
