= Ronald Squire =

British actor (1886–1958)

- Born: 25 March 1886; Tiverton, Devon, England
- Died: 16 November 1958 (aged 72); London, England
- Occupation: Actor
- Years active: 1916–1958

Ronald Launcelot Squire (25 March 1886 – 16 November 1958) was an English character actor.

== Biography ==
Squire was born in Tiverton, Devon, England, the son of an army officer, Lt.-Col. Frederick Squirl and his Irish-born wife Mary. (Ronald's surname 'Squire' was his stage name.) He attended Wellington College and started professional life as a journalist, before training at RADA. He spent his early acting career in Liverpool repertory theatre in light comedy roles, before moving on to films. His appearances include The Rocking Horse Winner, The Million Pound Note and Mike Todd's lavish 1956 version of Around the World in 80 Days. He died 16 November 1958 aged 72, after being taken ill at his home in Great Ormond Street, London.

He made numerous appearances in West End plays alongside his film career. These included performances in On Approval, The Bread-Winner, All Rights Reserved, Ducks and Drakes, While the Sun Shines, Jane, The Way Things Go, The Iron Duchess, A Penny for a Song and A Touch of the Sun.

He married Muriel Martin-Harvey in 1914, with whom he had a daughter.

== Partial filmography ==
- Whoso Is Without Sin (1916) - Roger Markham
- Unfinished Symphony (1934) - Count Esterhazy
- Forbidden Territory (1934) - Sir Charles Farringdon
- Wild Boy (1934) - Rollo
- Come Out of the Pantry (1935) - Eccles
- Love in Exile (1936) - Paul
- Dusty Ermine (1936) - Jim Kent
- Action for Slander (1938) - Charles Cinderford
- Freedom Radio (1941) - Rudolf Spiedler
- The Flemish Farm (1943) - Hardwicke
- Don't Take It to Heart (1944) - Music Lover at Ball
- Journey Together (1945) - Group Captain on Aircrew Interview Board
- While the Sun Shines (1947) - Duke of Ayr and Sterling
- The First Gentleman (1948) - Mr. Brougham
- Woman Hater (1948) - Jameson
- The Rocking Horse Winner (1949) - Oscar Cresswell
- No Highway in the Sky (1951) - Sir John, Director
- Encore (1951) - Doctor (segment "Winter Cruise")
- It Started in Paradise (1952) - Mary Jane
- My Cousin Rachel (1952) - Nicholas Kendall
- Laxdale Hall (1953) - General Matheson
- Always a Bride (1953) - Victor Hemsley
- The Million Pound Note (1954) - Oliver Montpelier
- The Man Who Loved Redheads (1955) - Wilberforce (uncredited)
- Raising a Riot (1955) - Grampy
- Footsteps in the Fog (1955) - Alfred Travers
- Josephine and Men (1955) - Frederick Luton
- Now and Forever (1956) - Waiter
- The Silken Affair (1956) - Marberry
- Around the World in 80 Days (1956) - Reform Club Member #1
- Sea Wife (1957) - Clubman
- Island in the Sun (1957) - Governor Templeton
- Law and Disorder (1958) - Colonel Masters
- The Sheriff of Fractured Jaw (1958) - Toynbee - His Solicitor
- The Inn of the Sixth Happiness (1958) - Sir Francis Jamison
- Count Your Blessings (1959) - Sir Conrad Allingham (final film role)
