= Finn Varra Maa =

1917 opera by Geoffrey Molyneux Palmer

- by Geoffrey Molyneux Palmer
- Librettist: Thomas Henry Nally
- Premiere: 1917

Finn Varra Maa is a 1917 opera by the Irish composer Geoffrey Molyneux Palmer (1882–1957) to a libretto by Thomas Henry Nally (1869–1932). A Christmas pageant, the premiere took place at the Theatre Royal, Dublin, on 26 December 1917. The title role was performed by Brefni O'Rorke. Because of the participation of a choir of "seventy girls from the famous Loreto College Choir, and about thirty boys from Westland Row Schools" – referring to the Loreto Abbey convent school and the Royal Irish Academy of Music in Westland Row, Dublin – there were "matinee" performances (at 2:30pm) only. John Moody conducted the performance, with George O'Neill as chorus master, and costumes were designed by the Dun Emer Guild.

The title of the work translates from Gaelic as meaning "good Finbar", and it is subtitled An Irish Fairy Pantomime in four acts. The score appears to be lost, and it survives as a libretto only, published in a drama series by Talbot Press, Dublin, in 1917. Finn Varra Maa premiered 20 months after the Easter Rising, and "proved at least mildly subversive". The work was a political satire that was much criticised for its nationalism. On 8 January 1918, it was reported that the provost marshal had censored the play, banning certain lines that contravened the Defence of the Realm Act. Journalist Fintan O'Toole wrote that Finn Varra Maa was a "conscious attempt to repel the invasion of the alien Santa".

A review in the Freeman's Journal clarified the character of the "pantomime": "Finn Varra Maa has been called a pantomime, but it is something more. In parts it approximates to light opera. It is certainly vastly more melodious than the mixture which usually poses as pantomime. The composer, Mr. G. Molyneux Palmer, has devised a light and dainty setting for solos and choruses alike and his work should meet with general appreciation." Art historian Nicola Gordon Bowe classified Finn Varra Maa as a pageant production in The Arts and Crafts Movements in Dublin and Edinburgh, 1885–1925.
