= This Was a Woman =

1948 film

- Trade ad, Kinematograph Weekly, 1948
- Directed by: Tim Whelan
- Written by: Val Valentine (adapted from the film treatment by Joan Morgan)
- Based on: play This Was a Woman by Joan Morgan
- Produced by: Marcel Hellman
- Starring: Sonia Dresdel; Walter Fitzgerald; Emrys Jones
- Cinematography: Hal Britten; Günther Krampf
- Edited by: Edward B. Jarvis
- Music by: Mischa Spoliansky
- Production company: Excelsior Films
- Distributed by: Twentieth Century Fox
- Release dates: 21 June 1948 (United Kingdom); 4 January 1949 (United States)
- Running time: 102 minutes
- Country: United Kingdom
- Language: English

This Was a Woman is a 1948 British crime film directed by Tim Whelan and starring Sonia Dresdel, Walter Fitzgerald and Emrys Jones. It was written by Val Valentine from a treatment by based on a successful play by former film actress Joan Morgan. Its plot concerns an outwardly respectable family dominated by a murderous matriarch.

== Plot ==
Sylvia Russell is a woman who likes to get her own way. With a huge ambition to exercise power, she has had to be content with manipulating and demoralising her sweet natured husband and controlling the lives of her children, all while presenting the appearance of a devoted wife and mother.

When her daughter Fenella announces that she is going to marry Val, Sylvia is furious at this sign of independence and while pretending to welcome Val into the family, does everything she can to undermine the marriage, eventually splitting the couple up.

Her son, although not really understanding why, chooses never to bring his girlfriend to the house; is he beginning to comprehend his mother's true character?

When Austin, her husband's old friend, returns to England after many successful years abroad with the same company, Sylvia sees a chance to further her ambitions. She feels sure that she can achieve the power she craves with the right person at her side. And then her husband falls ill...

== Cast ==
- Sonia Dresdel as Sylvia Russell
- Walter Fitzgerald as Arthur Russell
- Emrys Jones as Terry Russell
- Barbara White as Fenella Russell
- Scott Forbes as Dr. Valentine Christie
- Cyril Raymond as Austin Penrose
- Marjorie Rhodes as Mrs. Holmes
- Celia Lipton as Effie
- Lesley Osmond as Sally
- Kynaston Reeves as Dr. Morrison
- Joan Hickson as Miss Johnson
- Clive Morton as company director
- Percy Walsh as Professor of Music
- Noel Howlett as Chief Surgeon Barclay
- Gus McNaughton as vet

== Production ==
The film was made at the Riverside Studios with sets designed by the art directors Ivan King and Andrew Mazzei.

== Music ==
In several scenes, White plays several compositions, having from the age of ten initially viewed a future career as a concert pianist. One piece was a concerto written especially for her by Russian-born composer Mischa Spoliansky (1898–1985).

== Reception ==
The Monthly Film Bulletin wrote: "This film is extremely well acted by all concerned, and the characters made as convincing as possible. It is only difficult to imagine how anyone could have believed that Mrs. Russell was anything but the extraordinarily unpleasant character she was finally proved to be. It was so patent to the audience that something nasty would happen to Mr. Russell while his children were away on a voyage that one felt that the children, by analogy with what had already happened, themselves might have had an inkling of it before they left. The tension is well sustained and one's attention is held throughout."

Kine Weekly wrote: "The story is on the novelettish side and not all the acting, direction and dialogue is impeccable. Its faults are further accentuated by a reluctance to get to grips with its extravagant theme, but Sonia Dresdel is more than a match for its theatre. Helped by an exceptionally good musical score, she slowly but surely overcomes its shortcomings and, at the same time, wrings much arresting melodrama from its hocus-pocus. Studies of bad women are usually pretty good business, and judging from its tryout, at which we attended, his essay should amply endorse the rule. Its strong feminine angle is its comfortable sheet-anchor."

Variety wrote: "It was in the play This Was a Woman that comparatively unknown Sonia Dresdel rose to stage stardom. Her part was a tour-de-orce and this applies to the present screen version. Actress dominates the film as she did the play. She has tremendous personality and great talent, but unfortunately has been allowed to carry over to the screen certain annoying stage mannerisms."
