= Footsteps in the Fog =

1955 British film by Arthur Lubin

- Directed by: Arthur Lubin
- Written by: Lenore J. Coffee; Dorothy Davenport; Arthur Pierson
- Based on: short story by W. W. Jacobs
- Produced by: M. J. Frankovich; Maxwell Setton
- Starring: Stewart Granger; Jean Simmons
- Cinematography: Christopher Challis
- Edited by: Alan Osbiston
- Music by: Benjamin Frankel
- Production company: Frankovich Productions
- Distributed by: Columbia Pictures
- Release date: June 1955
- Running time: 90 minutes
- Country: United Kingdom
- Language: English
- Budget: £
- Box office: 552,430 admissions (France)

Footsteps in the Fog is a 1955 British Technicolor Victorian-era crime thriller starring Stewart Granger and Jean Simmons, with a screenplay co-written by Lenore Coffee and Dorothy Davenport, and released by Columbia Pictures. Directed by Arthur Lubin, the film is based on the W. W. Jacobs short story "The Interruption".

It was shot at Shepperton Studios, with sets designed by the art director Wilfred Shingleton.

== Plot ==
After poisoning and killing his wife, the master of the house, Stephen Lowry, is blackmailed by his Cockney maid, Lily Watkins, who demands promotion. As she steadily takes the place of his dead wife, Lowry attempts to murder her as well. While attempting to murder Lily, by following someone who looks like her through the fog, he mistakenly kills Constable Burke's wife and gets chased by an angry mob, which he evades. Lily returns home and Stephen learns of his mistake. Some local bar-goers saw him murder Mrs Burke and Stephen is put on trial, but their claims are dismissed after they are revealed to drink a lot and Lily lies to provide an alibi. The main testimony however is Lily's – who swears he never left the house – she does this as she wants to marry him.

Although Lowry owes Lily his life, his eyes are on another woman, Elizabeth Travers, the daughter of a wealthy man and object of affection of his lawyer. He tells Lily it is part of a plot to gain money and he will use the money to take Lily with him to America. He suggests he will marry her but demands she retrieves a letter she sent to her sister telling of Lowry's actions. But Herbert, her sister's husband, rescues the incriminating letter from the fire. He goes to Lowry's lawyer and tries to extort £500 for it.

Lowry feigns illness and sends Lily to fetch the doctor. She says she will return urgently with the doctor within five minutes. He calculates this will be enough time for him to frame her by drinking the poison that he used to kill his own wife and planting it and his wife's jewellery in Lily's room.

Lily is, however, detained by the police as the "tell-all" letter she has written to her sister, to safeguard herself after the master's failed plot to kill her, surfaces.

Lowry's plan backfires – he is dying. He gets Burke the local policeman to run for the doctor. Meanwhile, Lily's handwriting is compared to the letter. Lily is told it does not match – but it does. A warrant is sworn for the arrest of Lowry. Lily returns to the house and pieces together the situation, realising that Stephen never loved her as he accuses her of poisoning both him and his wife. After the doctor declares it is too late to save him, Lowry admits "I timed it, you said you'd be only five minutes!" Stephen dies and Lily is asked to go to the police station for questioning.

== Cast ==
- Stewart Granger as Stephen Lowry
- Jean Simmons as Lily Watkins
- Bill Travers as David Macdonald, Lowry's lawyer
- Belinda Lee as Elizabeth Travers
- Ronald Squire as Alfred Travers
- Finlay Currie as Inspector Peters
- William Hartnell as Herbert Moresby
- Frederick Leister as Dr. Simpson
- Percy Marmont as Magistrate
- Marjorie Rhodes as Mrs. Park
- Peter Bull as Brasher
- Barry Keegan as Constable Burke
- Sheila Manahan as Rose Moresby
- Norman Macowan as Grimes
- Cameron Hall as Corcoran
- Victor Maddern as Jones
- Arthur Howard as vicar
- Peter Williams as Constable Farrow
- Erik Chitty as Hedges

== Production ==
=== Development ===
The film was based on a story "The Interruption", first published in the July 4, 1925, issue of Liberty magazine and later collected in Sea Whispers in 1926. Arthur Lubin bought the rights to the story in August 1949 for his own company. Several parties were interested in the story. The rights holders liked the job Lubin did on Two Sinners based on the story of a friend of theirs, Warwick Deeping. Lubin hoped to make the film in October 1949 from a script by Dorothy Reid with Glenn Ford starring.

However Lubin instead made Francis the Talking Mule and became busy doing comedies with animals. He continued to seek finance for The Interruption saying he wanted to "remind producers that he can direct people too." In August 1951 he said he said signed Leonard Styles to play the barrister and wanted to make the movie after It Grows on Trees. In April 1952 Lubin said Dorothy Reid was writing a script and that he hoped to star Jean Simmons or Jennifer Jones in the female lead and Robert Donat in the male lead.

In July 1952 Lubin said he was about to sign a deal with James Woolf of Romulus Films. He visited England in August seeking to raise finance and hoped for Terence Rattigan to write the script.

In October 1953 Lubin, who had just made Star of India in England, said he planned to shoot his still unproduced crime thriller in that country as The Interrupted with Glynis Johns in the female lead. In March 1954 the film was called Deadlock and Lubin had sent a script to Alec Guinness. Then in June 1954 Lubin said Columbia had agreed to finance and that Maureen O'Hara and George Sanders would star.

Then in October Lubin announced the stars would be Stewart Granger and Jean Simmons and the film would be made by Mike Frankovich's company, Film Locations. Later the title would be changed to Rebound before Footsteps in the Fog.

Lenore Coffee, who had a good reputation as a script doctor, was hired to rewrite the script. She started that process by going through the existing script with Granger, and found him "[h]ighly intelligent, more responsive to new ideas than I had expected, and capable of building on them."

The film was to be the second in a four picture slate from Frankovich's Film Locations. The first was Fire Over Africa. The third was to be Ghosts of Drury Lane directed by Lubin. The fourth was to be Matador starring and directed by José Ferrer. The third and fourth films were not made.

=== Shooting ===
Arthur Lubin said he enjoyed making the film. "Mike [Frankovich] was a very nice person to work for", he recalled. "I had problems with the leading man, Stewart Granger, who hated me. He didn't like anything. He would go to Frankovich and say 'Mike, if Lubin doesn't stop annoying me I'm going to be sick tomorrow.' But miraculously the picture turned out to be a good one." He said "it was a great pleasure to work with Jean Simmons."

The production budget was £112,118 plus an additional sum of $453,000 in fees for Stewart Granger and Jean Simmons, director Lubin and screenwriters Coffee and Davenport.

Lubin wanted to follow it with another film for Frankovich, Ghosts of Drury Lane, which was never made.

== Reception ==
According to Kinematograph Weekly it was a "money maker" at the British box office in 1955.

The Monthly Film Bulletin wrote: "The story contains many echoes of Gaslight, and its Edwardian London setting includes the conventional elements of swirling fog, comic lower orders and sinister doings in the Big House. Although the mood of dark, enclosed terror is unevenly sustained, the film benefits from some stylish decor and photography and is quite efficiently directed. Stewart Granger and Jean Simmons provide very competent, if conventional, portraits of murderer and blackmailer, and the court scene contains a sharp performance by Peter Bull as the prosecuting counsel. The romantic sub-plot is rather tediously developed."

A contemporary Variety review called it "humdrum, rarely exciting."

In 2015 Gene Blottner said the movie is a "good Gothic noir" with both Simmons and Granger "believably playing vile characters."

In 2019 Diabolique magazine called it "an unpretentious, enjoyable little thriller... it doesn't hit great expressionistic heights but is lots of fun, and it's a shame box office receptions weren't strong enough to allow him do more work in this line."
