= While the Sun Shines (film) =

1947 English comedy film

- Directed by: Anthony Asquith
- Written by: Terence Rattigan; Anatole de Grunwald
- Based on: While the Sun Shines by Terence Rattigan
- Produced by: Anatole de Grunwald
- Starring: Barbara White; Ronald Squire; Brenda Bruce; Bonar Colleano; Michael Allan
- Cinematography: Jack Hildyard
- Edited by: Frederick Wilson
- Music by: Nicholas Brodzsky; Philip Green
- Production company: ABPC
- Distributed by: Associated British-Pathé (UK); Stratford Pictures Corporation (US)
- Release dates: 1 February 1947 (London, England)
- Running time: 82 minutes
- Country: England
- Language: English
- Budget: £110,840
- Box office: £146,173 (UK)

While the Sun Shines is a 1947 British comedy film directed by Anthony Asquith and starring Barbara White, Ronald Howard, Ronald Squire, Brenda Bruce, Bonar Colleano, and Michael Allan. It was written by Terence Rattigan and Anatole de Grunwald based on Rattigan's 1943 play of the same name.

== Plot ==
Lady Elisabeth Randall is an English Air Force corporal during World War II. She is on her way to marry her fiancé when she finds herself being romanced by two different men. The first man is Colbert, a Frenchman residing in England. The second man is Joe Mulvaney, an American lieutenant. Difficulties ensue as Lady Elisabeth finds that due to these romances both her military career and her impending marriage are in danger.

== Cast ==
- Barbara White as Lady Elisabeth Randall
- Ronald Howard as the Earl of Harpenden
- Ronald Squire as the Duke of Ayre
- Brenda Bruce as Mabel Crum
- Bonar Colleano as Joe Mulvaney
- Michael Allan as Colbert
- Miles Malleson as Horton
- Margaret Rutherford as Doctor Winifred Frye
- Cyril Maude as Admiral
- Garry Marsh as Mr Jordan
- Joyce Grenfell as Daphne
- Amy Frank as Mrs. Finckel
- Charles Victor as tube train conductor
- Wilfrid Hyde-White as receptionist
- Judith Furse as female receptionist
- Clive Morton as guide
- Cecil Trouncer as naval Captain
- Vida Hope as Elsie
- Aubrey Mallalieu as night porter

== Reception ==
=== Box office ===
As of 1 April 1950 the film earned distributor's gross receipts of £98,984 in the UK of which £62,807 went to the producer. The film made a loss of £48,033.

=== Critical ===
The Monthly Film Bulletin wrote: "With expensive mounting and some inventive touches of direction this is a gay, bubbling piece. As cinema, however, it lacks smoothness, possibly because Rattigan, collaborating on the screen version, cannot detach himself from his stage affiliations. Each sequence seems to have a beginning and an end as definite as the raising and lowering of the curtain."

Kine Weekly wrote: "Friendly, immaculately mannered triangle comedy, freely adapted from Terence Rattigan's huge London stage success. ... Whatever the narrative lacks in sustained wit and piquancy it amply gains in its unblushing appeal to the womenfolk and gallery."

TV Guide wrote that "The direction never convinces the viewer that this story was meant to be told anywhere but on the stage".

In his book Anthony Asquith, Tom Ryall noted that the film "reflected the tone though not the success of its stage predecessor."
