= The Astonished Heart (film) =

1950 British film by Terence Fisher

- Directed by: Terence Fisher; Antony Darnborough
- Written by: Noël Coward
- Produced by: Antony Darnborough
- Starring: Celia Johnson; Noël Coward; Margaret Leighton
- Cinematography: Jack Asher
- Edited by: Vladimir Sagovsky
- Music by: Noël Coward; William Blezard (uncredited)
- Production company: Sydney Box Productions (for) Gainsborough Pictures
- Distributed by: General Film Distributors (UK)
- Release date: March 1950 (UK)
- Running time: 85 minutes
- Country: United Kingdom
- Language: English
- Box office: £93,000 (by 1953); 21,168 admissions (France)

The Astonished Heart is a 1950 British drama film directed by Terence Fisher and Antony Darnborough. Starring Celia Johnson, Noël Coward, and Margaret Leighton, the film is based on Coward's play The Astonished Heart from his cycle of ten plays, Tonight at 8.30.

Inspired by the great success of the 1945 film Brief Encounter, which also had been adapted from Tonight at 8:30, Coward agreed to have The Astonished Heart produced as a motion picture. As with the previous film, Coward also wrote the screenplay. Production began in 1949 and featured not only Noël Coward in one of his rare film appearances, but also actor-singer Graham Payn in a supporting role. The Astonished Heart was released in 1950 to indifferent reviews and was a commercial failure.

The title is taken from a passage in the Bible Deuteronomy 28:28: "The LORD shall smite thee with madness, and blindness, and astonishment of heart", referenced by the lead character.

== Plot ==
The film is about a psychiatrist, Faber, who begins an affair with Leonora, a former schoolfriend of his wife Barbara, and the effects upon all of them of the love triangle, until the affair ends in acrimony and tragedy.

== Cast ==
- Celia Johnson as Barbara Faber
- Noël Coward as Dr. Christian Faber
- Margaret Leighton as Leonora Vail
- Joyce Carey as Susan Birch
- Graham Payn as Tim Verney
- Amy Veness as Alice Smith
- Ralph Michael as Philip Lucas
- Michael Hordern as Ernest
- Patricia Glyn as Helen
- Alan Webb as Sir Reginald
- Everley Gregg as Miss Harper
- John Salew as Mr. Bowman

== Production ==
A very successful film, Brief Encounter (1945), had been made from Still Life, one of the plays that made up Tonight at 8:30. In July 1948, Sydney Box, head of Gainsborough Studios, paid £10,000 to Noël Coward to script Astonished Heart from Tonight at 8:30. Box also planned to make a film called Tonight at 8:30 consisting of Fumed Oak with Kathleen Harrison and Jack Warner, Family Album with Margaret Leighton and Graham Payn, and Red Peppers with Cicely Courtneidge and Jack Hulbert (This film would become Meet Me Tonight with a different cast.)

Box was happy with the script for Astonished Heart and put it into production with Michael Redgrave in the lead, with Coward's approval. Redgrave wrote in his memoirs that Coward called him personally to offer him the part, saying only he or Redgrave could play the part. Redgrave wrote that the script - which he said was by Muriel Box although only Coward is credited - was faithful to the play, although the actor struggled with how his character committed suicide.

Rehearsals took place at Denham, during which Redgrave says he began to lose confidence. He wanted to alter some of the words, but Coward's contract forbade that. Filming started in June 1949. Coward had been away in Jamaica and the US, arriving back in London on 13 June. The next day, he went to Pinewood and wrote in his diary "Saw rushes and rough cut. Margaret Leighton and Celia absolutely brilliant, but Mike [Redgrave] definitely not right. Had a talk with him and then, on the way home, decided to play the picture myself. The situation now is tricky." The following day, he met with Tony Darnbough, Sydney Box and Redgrave. Coward wrote "It was mostly a duologue between Mike and me. Eventually he suggested that I play the picture myself. He behaved really and truly superbly, and I will always respect him for it." It was the first time Coward would appear in a film since In Which We Serve in 1942.

Redgrave later said he suggested other actors, including Stewart Granger before Coward's name was mentioned. He reflected "that Noél himself had probably engineered this situation as the most tactful way of replacing me."

Representatives of J. Arthur Rank tried to get Coward to appear in the film for nothing but he refused. He was given a guaranteed £25,000 and a percentage of the profits. Another source says Coward was paid a fee of £15,000.

Filming took place through June and finished on 19 September. On 1 September, Coward wrote in his diary "it is obviously going to be a fine picture." On 10 November, he saw a rough cut while working with composer Muir Matheson. Coward wrote, "There is an essential lack in the picture, and that is that I am never seen being a great psychiatrist and the reasons for my suicide do not seem enough. It is nearly good but not quite."

== Critical reception ==
In February, Coward took Alfred Lunt and Lynn Fontanne to the press screening and premiere for the film in New York. "They were tremendously impressed," he wrote. "Every-one seemed to be enthusiastic... The picture, in spite of censorship cuts, is pretty good. I think I have made a success. We shall see." Redgrave wrote in his memoirs: "I could not resist seeing the film, nor help noticing that Noél had taken more pains over the script than in the version which had given me such difficulty. Nor could I help the feeling that my doubts about the story had been confirmed in the result, though there was not much joy in that."

The New York Times wrote, "Mr. Coward is capable of doing better, though there are moments when the dialogue lets off caustic sparks."

Variety said "While film has a clever veneer, yarn lacks the more basic quality of credibility due to insufficient motivation of the central character."

When the reviews came out Coward wrote:

Oh dear. I really seem quite unable to please. If the picture turns out to be a flop it will doubtless save me a lot of trouble. It's odd, but I really don't mind nearly so much as I should have done a few years ago; in fact, I hardly mind at all. It would, of course, have been nice if they had all come out with blazing headlines saying it was the most marvellous film ever produced. It is only fairly good really, and censorship has certainly done nothing to improve it... It is dignified and intelligent and my performance is honest and good.

According to Graham Payn the poor reaction to the film caused Coward to refuse any further offers to play lead roles in films. He wrote, "Noël hadn't even enjoyed the experience on stage in the first place: "I hated playing Faber. It depressed me." On stage, for forty-five minutes, it doesn't much matter. On the big screen, stretched to feature-film length, the structural defect is all too obvious. On top of that, Noël Coward wasn't being "Noël Coward"." Coward made a mild dig at the film in his short story "Star Quality", published the year after The Astonished Heart was released: "... an exquisitely acted but rather tedious picture about a psychiatrist who committed suicide".

== Sources ==
- Coward, Noel (1969). "Star Quality". The Collected Short Stories of Noël Coward. London: Heinemann. ISBN 0-43-414701-X.
- Coward, Noël (2007). Day, Barry (ed.). The Letters of Noël Coward. London: Methuen. ISBN 978-1-4081-0675-4.
- Redgrave, Michael (1984). In My Mind's Eye: An autobiography. London: Coronet. ISBN 978-0-340-36382-9.
