= Trio (1950 film) =

1950 film by Harold French, Ken Annakin

- Australian daybill
- Directed by: Ken Annakin; Harold French
- Written by: W. Somerset Maugham; Noel Langley; R. C. Sherriff
- Based on: three short stories by W. Somerset Maugham
- Produced by: Antony Darnborough
- Starring: Anne Crawford; Roland Culver; Kathleen Harrison; James Hayter; Nigel Patrick; Michael Rennie; Jean Simmons; Naunton Wayne
- Cinematography: Geoffrey Unsworth; Reginald H. Wyer
- Edited by: Alfred Roome
- Music by: John Greenwood; Muir Mathieson
- Production companies: Gainsborough Pictures; Rank Organisation
- Distributed by: General Film Distributors (UK); Paramount Pictures (US)
- Release date: 1 August 1950
- Running time: 91 minutes
- Country: United Kingdom
- Language: English
- Box office: £147,000 (by 1953)

Trio (also known as W. Somerset Maugham's Trio) is a 1950 British anthology film based on three short stories by W. Somerset Maugham: "The Verger", "Mr Know-All" and "Sanatorium". Ken Annakin directed "The Verger" and "Mr Know-All", while Harold French was responsible for "Sanatorium".

Trio is the second of a film trilogy, all consisting of adaptations of Maugham's stories, preceded by the 1948 Quartet and followed by the 1951 Encore. Production budget of the film was shared by the J. Arthur Rank Organization and Paramount.

It was the final film released under the Gainsborough Pictures banner.

== Plots ==
=== The Verger ===
The new vicar at St Peter's Church is astonished to learn that the long-serving verger, Albert Foreman, is illiterate. Foreman is too set in his ways to want to learn to read and write, and the vicar feels he has no choice but to sack him. Foreman's savings, while substantial, are not enough to sustain him for the rest of his life. On the way back to his lodgings, Foreman notices that there is no tobacconist's shop in the area and decides to open one. He also proposes to his landlady Emma. Their shop is so successful that when his stepdaughter's husband loses his job Foreman sets up another shop for them to run. Over the next ten years, Foreman starts up ten shops and becomes wealthy. The bank manager recommends that Foreman invest his savings, causing him to reveal that he cannot read the necessary papers. The manager exclaims, "What would you be today if you had been able to?" Foreman replies that he would be the verger at St Peter's.

=== Mr Know-All ===
Reserved Mr Gray finds himself forced to share a cabin on an ocean liner with the loud, opinionated, supremely self-confident gem dealer Max Kelada. Kelada soon dominates all the onboard social gatherings, much to the annoyance of his fellow passengers, who take to calling him "Mr Know-All" behind his back because of his insistence that he is an expert on all subjects. One night, Kelada remarks on the fine quality of the pearl necklace worn by Mrs Ramsay, who has rejoined her husband after a two-year separation caused by his work. Mr Ramsay bets Kelada ten pounds that the pearls are fake. Kelada accepts the wager, despite Mrs Ramsay's attempt to call it off. While he is examining the pearls Kelada observes that the woman is very uneasy. He then says that he was wrong and pays Mr Ramsay. Afterwards, back in their cabin, Gray and Kelada are surprised when two five-pound notes are slipped under their door in an envelope. Gray gets Kelada to tell the truth: the pearls are real and very costly. Kelada adds that he would not have left such an attractive wife alone for that long. Gray begins to warm to his cabin mate.

=== Sanatorium ===
This segment is based on "Sanatorium", which was first published in Ashenden: Or the British Agent.

Mr Ashenden is sent to a sanatorium for patients of tuberculosis and becomes acquainted with the other residents. Another newcomer is Major George Templeton, who admires the lovely Evie Bishop. Evie has spent years in one sanatorium after another. Ashenden also observes the feud between two long-term patients, Mr Campbell and Mr McLeod, who delight in making each other's lives miserable. One more patient, Mr Chester, resents the visits of his wife because he envies her robust good health. McLeod dies, depriving Campbell of his enjoyment of life. After George and Evie fall in love the doctors warn them that George will hasten his death if they marry, but they decide that happiness, no matter how brief, is worth the price. Their example eases Mr Chester's bitterness about his own fate.

== Cast ==
=== The Verger ===
- James Hayter as Albert Foreman
- Kathleen Harrison as Emma Foreman (née Brown)
- Felix Aylmer as the Bank Manager
- Lana Morris as Gladys, Emma's daughter
- Henry Edwards as church warden
- Michael Hordern as the vicar
- Eliot Makeham as Sexton
- Glyn Houston as Ted, Gladys's husband

=== Mr. Know-All ===
- Anne Crawford as Mrs Ramsay
- Nigel Patrick as Max Kelada
- Naunton Wayne as Mr Ramsay
- Wilfred Hyde-White as Mr Gray
- Clive Morton as the Ship's Captain
- Bill Travers as Fellowes (credited as Bill Linden-Travers)

=== Sanatorium ===
- Jean Simmons as Evie Bishop
- Michael Rennie as Major George Templeton
- Roland Culver as Mr Ashenden
- Finlay Currie as Mr McLeod
- Betty Ann Davies as Mrs Chester
- Raymond Huntley as Henry Chester
- John Laurie as Mr Campbell
- André Morell as Dr Lennox
- Andrew Crawford as carriage driver

== Production ==
Earl St John presold half the film's cost to Paramount.

Director Harold French enjoyed doing the film although he later said he should have concentrated on the illness of the central characters more than the romance. He said Guy Rolfe was originally cast but had to drop out due to consumption and was replaced by Michael Rennie.

Ken Annakin had directed an installment of Quartet and says being on the film "gave me full scope for leading actors through the character subtleties developed by the master."

== Reception ==
=== Critical ===
Bosley Crowther described the film as "another delightful screen potpourri, made from short stories of W. Somerset Maugham ... Wonderfully rich ... Shot through with keen, ironic humor".

TV Guide called it "a small and highly enjoyable film".

=== Box office ===
Trade papers called the film a "notable box office attraction" in British cinemas in 1950. According to Kinematograph Weekly Trio was a "runner up" at the box office in 1950 Britain.

== Accolades ==
The film was nominated for the Academy Award for Best Sound, Recording (Cyril Crowhurst)
