= Geoffrey Molyneux Palmer =

Irish composer

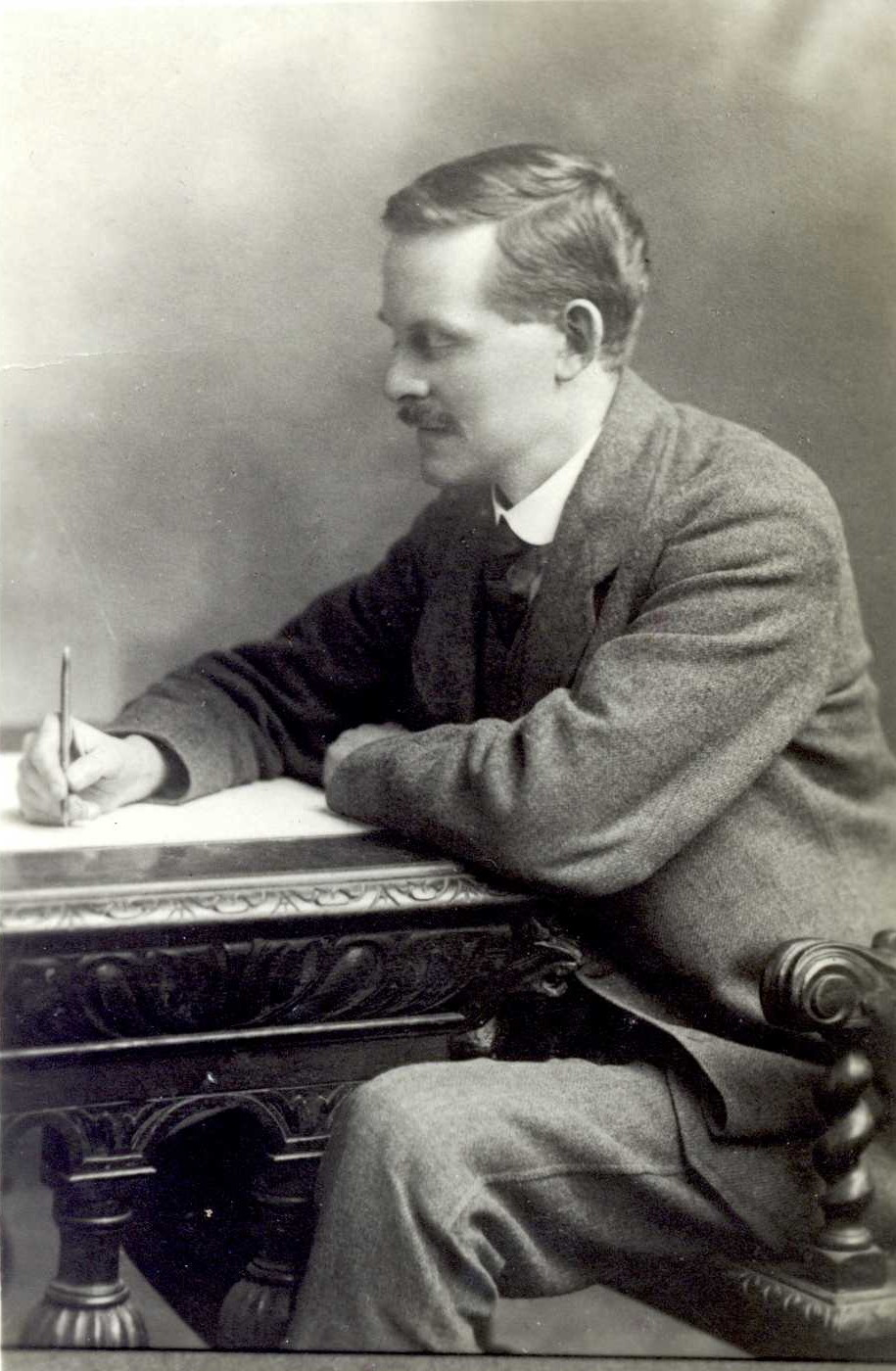
Geoffrey Molyneux Palmer

Geoffrey Molyneux Palmer (Irish: Seathrún de Pámar, 8 October 1882 – 29 November 1957) was an Irish composer, mainly of operas and vocal music, among them the first musical settings of poems by James Joyce.

== Biography ==
Palmer was born of Protestant Irish parents in Staines, Middlesex (England). He grew up in South Woodford, near London, where his father, Abram Smythe Palmer, was vicar at Holy Trinity Church. He studied at Oxford where, in 1901, he was the youngest Bachelor of Music in college history. Between 1904 and 1907 he studied composition with Charles V. Stanford at the Royal College of Music, London. He moved to Ireland in 1910 where he was initially active as a church organist in Dublin suburbs. From his early twenties he suffered from multiple sclerosis, which made a professional independence increasingly difficult. In the last decades of his life, Palmer used a wheelchair and depended upon the care of his two sisters, who were running Hillcourt, a private girls' boarding school in Glenageary, near their home in Sandycove (south Dublin). Palmer died in Dublin.

== Music ==
Palmer's music includes at least three operas, a number of choral pieces and many songs. His strong interest in opera came during a politically difficult period in Irish history. Ireland was struggling for independence, and cultural politicians often regarded opera (and classical music in general) as alien to Irish culture. Initially, however, he was successful, his earliest stage work being Finn Varra Maa (a transliteration from the Gaelic meaning "good Finbar"), subtitled The Irish Santa Claus. It survives as a libretto only, published in a drama series by Talbot Press, Dublin, in 1917. Contrary to what the (sub-)title may suggest, the work was a political satire that was much criticised for its nationalism. Sruth na Maoile ("The Sea of Moyle") was first performed in July 1923 and restaged by the O'Mara Opera Company in the cultural by-programme of the Tailteann Games in August 1924. Its story is based on the legend of the Children of Lir, while the music relies on numerous references to Irish traditional music, including the song Silent O Moyle from Thomas Moore's Irish Melodies. A third work, Grania Goes (1924), conceived as a light, comic opera, could not be performed in the years following Irish independence. The manuscript scores of the Sruth na Maoile and Grania Goes are in the National Library of Ireland. Between 1925 and 1930, Palmer embarked on a cycle of three full-scale operas on the Cuchullain cycle to words by William Mervyn Crofton. In one of them, Deirdre of the Sorrows (1925), Crofton acknowledged the "beautiful music" of Palmer's. Despite this, Palmer's illness prevented the completion of the score, which was later handed over to the composer Staf Gebruers (1902–1970), but they were never performed. The manuscript scores of the operas "Cuchullain" and "Deirdre of the Sorrows" composed by Staf Gebruers are held by his son Adrian. Unfortunately, despite extensive searching, so far the score of "The Wooing of Emer" has failed to surface, though it is referenced in Staf Gebruers' own inventories and mentioned as being of three hours duration. In addition, there is a copy of "The King's Song" also composed by Staf Gebruers with lyrics by Crofton and described as from Act 1 of "The Black Hag", but whether or not this has any connection with Palmer so far is unknown.

Palmer was mainly known as the composer of light songs and ballads, often in a folkloristic style, that found publishers in England and were frequently performed. "They show a skilled hand with a talent for vocal harmony but little originality." His choral music is mainly on a similar miniature scale, an exception being the early cantata The Abbot of Innisfallen (1909). There are some isolated examples of orchestral music performed by the orchestra of Radio Éireann, but the surviving references may not give a full picture of his output.

Posthumously, Palmer created a sensation among Joyce scholars and musicologists, when in 1982 it was discovered that Palmer had been the first composer to set the poetry of James Joyce to music. In fact, his settings were known but believed to be lost, until they were discovered in the library of Southern Illinois University at Carbondale. Joyce had once remarked in a 1934 letter to his brother Stanislaus that "30 or 40 composers at least have set my little poems to music. The best is Molyneux Palmer. After him are Moeran and Bliss." (Joyce-Letters, vol. 3, p. 340). Palmer had set 32 of the 36 poems in Joyce's poetry collection Chamber Music (1907) between 1907 and 1949. They were never published in his lifetime, although some were performed and broadcast in Ireland after Joyce's death in 1941 by baritone Tomás Ó Súilleabháin and pianist Rhoda Coghill. Russel (1993) speculated that Palmer purposefully hid these songs, because an association with Joyce was difficult in Ireland for many years and he didn't want to risk his fragile situation in the medical care of his sisters who depended on good reputation. The most remarkable aspect of the Joyce songs is their quality. They are much more artistic, "contemporary" in style and technically more advanced than any of his other compositions. Although the songs have initially been performed, published and recorded, they have not yet entered the regular performing repertory of anglophone singers.

== Selected works ==
Opera

- Finn Varra Maa (The Irish Santa Claus) (Thomas Henry Nally), "Irish Fairy Pantomime", 4 acts, 1917 (Dublin: Theatre Royal, December 1917)
- Sruth na Maoile (Thomas O'Kelly), opera, 3 acts, 1922 (Dublin: Gaiety Theatre, 25 July 1923)
- Grania Goes (Thomas O'Kelly), comic opera, 3 acts, 1924

Instrumental

- Quartet in G for two violins, zither and piano (unpublished, 1901)
- Dolás/Doleur (London, 1913) for cello and piano
- Suite Feis Ceoil No. 1 (1915) for orchestra
- Suite Feis Ceoil No. 2 (1922) for orchestra
- Knickerbocker Lane (1941) for orchestra
- Slip Jig (n. d.) for 2 pianos and side drum

Choral

- Sir Galahad, Op. 3 (Alfred Tennyson), for mixed chorus and orchestra (New York, 1909)
- The Abbot of Innisfallen: A Killarney Legend, Op. 5 (William Allingham), for baritone, chorus and orchestra (1908) (London, 1909)
- Anthems, Op. 13 (bibl.), mixed choir (London, 1911)
- Three Irish Folksongs, Op. 15. Contains: 1. "The County Mayo" (Thomas Lavelle, transl. George Fox); 2. (unknown, not published); 3. "Hush Song" (Christina Rossetti)], women's choir (London, 1913, except no. 2)
- Goodbye to Summer (W. Allingham), unison chorus (London, 1915)
- Serenade (W. Allingham), two-part song (London, 1920)
- Dumb! Dumb! Dumb! (Alfred Perceval Graves), unison chorus (London, 1931)
- Suantraidhe (Thomas O'Kelly), women's choir (Dublin, 1931)
- On Music (Thomas Moore), mixed choir (London, 1935)
- A Bhean úd Shíos (trad.), women's choir (Dublin, 1936)
- Paidir Fhionnghuala (trad.), women's choir (Dublin, 1936)
- Duain Chroí Iosa (Hymn to the Sacred Heart) (Tadhg Gaelach Ó Súilleabháin, G.M. Palmer), mixed choir (Dublin, 1953)
- Cogain na n-aingeal (The Angel's Whisper), Op. 20 No. 1 (Donal O'Sullivan, after Samuel Lover), women's choir (Dublin, 1953)

Partsongs (vocal quartet plus piano)

- Two Partsongs, Op. 1 (G. M. Palmer). Contains: 1. "Boreas"; 2. "Morning" (London, 1906)
- Four Partsongs, Op. 14. Contains: 1. "Come Away Death" (William Shakespeare); 2. "To Sylvia" (Robert Herrick); 3. "Open Horizons Round" (George Meredith); 4. "The Man for Galway" (Charles James Lever) (London, 1912)
- The Fairies (W. Allingham) (London, 1914)
- By that Dim Lake (Thomas Moore) (without piano) (London, 1920)
- Four Ducks on a Pond (William Allingham) (Dublin, 1928)
- The Fields in May (G.M. Palmer) (Dublin, 1928)
- The Robin (John Keble) (York, 1938)

Songs

- "The Heart-Beat" (Heinrich Heine, transl. George MacDonald) (London, 1904)
- 32 poems from Chamber Music (James Joyce), 1907–1949 (Bloomington, Indiana, 1993)
- Folksongs, Op. 12, (trad.). Contains: 1. "The Rose of Ardee"; 2. "The Dispute" (London & Dublin, 1911)
- "The Man for Galway" (Charles James Lever) (London, 1911)
- "Husho my Lanna" (Christina Rossetti) (London, 1914)
- "Nationality" (Thomas Davis) (Dublin, 1914)
- "The Sunny Boreen (An boithrin buidhe)" (trad.) (Dublin, 1915)
- "Lovely Mary Donnelly" (William Allingham) (Dublin, 1916)
- "When You Are Old" (William Butler Yeats) (Dublin, c.1950)
- "Holiday Song" from Grania Goes (Thomas O'Kelly) (Dublin, 1957)

== Bibliography ==
- Aloys Fleischmann (ed.): Music in Ireland. A Symposium (Cork: Cork University Press, 1952).
- Axel Klein: Die Musik Irlands im 20. Jahrhundert (Hildesheim: Georg Olms, 1996), ISBN 3-487-10196-3.
- Axel Klein: "Stage-Irish, or The National in Irish Opera", in: Opera Quarterly 21 (Winter 2005), p. 27–67.
- Axel Klein: "Palmer, Geoffrey Molyneux", in: The Encyclopaedia of Music in Ireland, ed. by Harry White and Barra Boydell (Dublin: UCD Press, 2013), p. 818–819.
- Myra Teicher Russel: James Joyce's Chamber Music. The Lost Song Settings (Bloomington & Indianapolis: Indiana University Press, 1993), ISBN 0-253-34994-X.
- Arthur Whellens: "The Sound of Music. Notes on Joyce and G. Molyneux Palmer", in: The Complete Consort. Saggi di anglistica in onore di Francesco Gozzi, ed. by Roberta Ferrari and Laura Giovannelli (Pisa: PLUS Pisa University Press, 2005), p. 251–266.
