= Encore (1951 film) =

British anthology film

- U.S. poster
- Directed by: Pat Jackson; Anthony Pelissier; Harold French
- Written by: T. E. B. Clarke; Arthur Macrae; Eric Ambler
- Produced by: Antony Darnborough
- Starring: Glynis Johns; Nigel Patrick; Kay Walsh; Roland Culver; Ronald Squire; Terence Morgan; Noel Purcell
- Cinematography: Desmond Dickinson
- Edited by: Alfred Roome
- Music by: Richard Addinsell
- Production company: Two Cities Films
- Distributed by: General Film Distributors (UK); Paramount (USA)
- Release date: 14 November 1951
- Running time: 89 minutes
- Country: United Kingdom
- Language: English
- Box office: £172,000 (by 1953)

Encore is a 1951 anthology film composed of adaptations of three short stories by W. Somerset Maugham:

- "The Ant and the Grasshopper", directed by Pat Jackson and adapted by T. E. B. Clarke;
- "Winter Cruise" (from the 1947 collection of Maugham stories Creatures of Circumstance), directed by Anthony Pelissier, screenplay by Arthur Macrae;
- "Gigolo and Gigolette" (from the 1940 collection of Maugham stories The Mixture as Before), directed by Harold French, written by Eric Ambler.

Maugham introduces each part of the film with a piece to camera from his garden on the French Riviera. Encore was the final film in a Maugham trilogy, preceded by Quartet and Trio. The film was entered into the 1952 Cannes Film Festival.

== Plot summary ==
=== "The Ant and the Grasshopper" ===
Idle Tom Ramsay continually borrows from his hard-working brother George. George later puts up the Ramsay estate for sale so he can buy out his business partner, despite Tom's protests. Shortly afterwards, George is approached by car dealer Philip Cronshaw, who notifies him that Tom has stolen one of his automobiles. To avoid a scandal, George pays for it, but it was all a fraud; Cronshaw and Tom split George's money.

While squandering his ill-gotten funds, Tom discovers that Gertrude Wilmot, the third richest woman in the world, is staying at the same seaside resort. He becomes acquainted with her, then (surmising that she is fed up with lying admirers) frankly admits that he is a scoundrel attracted to her great wealth. Surprisingly, this approach works and they become engaged.

Tom pays George back for all the money he borrowed over the years. When George complains about the injustice of Tom not having to work for his good fortune, Tom mentions that Gertrude is buying the family estate.

=== "Winter Cruise" ===
English spinster Molly Reid takes a sea cruise to Jamaica. To the annoyance of the other passengers and the crew, she talks non-stop on the outbound voyage. When the captain (Noel Purcell) learns that she will be returning on the same ship, he decides that something must be done to save the sanity of the crew. The ship's doctor suggests setting her up with a suitor. Pierre, the steward, is ordered to keep Molly occupied. The plan works; the crew's ears are spared, though Molly tells Pierre that she knows he is not in love with her. When disembarking from the ship, Molly tells the captain and crew that she knew all along that the romance had been arranged.

=== "Gigolo and Gigolette" ===
In Monte Carlo, Stella and Syd Cotman have a very successful nightclub act. She dives from a great height into a small, shallow tank of flaming water. However, a visit by Flora and Carlo Penezzi unnerves her. The older Penezzis used to have a similarly dangerous act: Flora was shot out of a cannon. Stella and Syd argue when she refuses to dive a second time each night, forcing Syd to change their contract with the nightclub manager.

In desperation, Stella takes their life savings, and attempts to win enough at the gambling tables so she can quit, but loses everything. Syd is infuriated when he finds out.

With no choice, she goes on with the act, even though she is terrified that she will eventually be killed. When Flora tells Syd how frightened his wife is, he rushes up the tower to stop her. But she, seeing his concern, dives safely into the tank.

== Cast ==
=== "The Ant and the Grasshopper" ===
- Nigel Patrick as Tom Ramsay
- Roland Culver as George Ramsay
- Peter Graves as Philip Cronshaw
- Alison Leggatt as Freda Ramsay
- Margaret Vyner as Gertrude Wilmot
- Michael Trubshawe as Ascot man

=== "Winter Cruise" ===
- Kay Walsh as Miss Molly Reid
- Ronald Squire as the ship's doctor
- Noel Purcell as Captain Tom
- John Laurie as Andrews, the engineer
- Jacques François as Pierre, the steward

=== "Gigolo and Gigolette" ===
- Glynis Johns as Stella Cotman
- Terence Morgan as Syd Cotman
- Mary Merrall as Flora Penezzi
- Martin Miller as Carlo Penezzi

== Production ==
Pat Jackson called his segment "lovely fun."

== Reception ==
=== Critical ===
The Monthly Film Bulletin wrote: "The Ant and the Grasshopper" is weakened by direction that is only competent when it should be sparkling, and by a charmless performance from Nigel Patrick. "Winter Cruise", however, is most enjoyable, well scripted by Arthur Macrae, with some lively handling by Pelissier and a brilliant performance by Kay Walsh. ... "Gigolo and Gigolette" survives the miscasting of Glynis Johns and Harold French's uninspired treatment through the well-constructed script of Eric Ambler and some good acting by minor players ... While one's fundamental objection to Encore is the same as to the previous Maugham films – that all the stories are just literally transplanted to the cinema and are not given the equivalent there of Maugham's tellingly concise, dry style – the film is entertaining because it contains above-average material, preserved with reasonable fidelity."

=== Box office ===
The film was success at the box office.
