= While the Sun Shines (play) =

Programme for the original production at the Globe

While the Sun Shines is a comedy play by the British writer Terence Rattigan which was first staged in 1943. It was a popular success, running for 1,154 performances, even more than Rattigan's previous hit French Without Tears, and proved his longest running West End play. A Broadway production followed in 1944, though it ran for only 39 performances.

== Synopsis ==
The action takes place over three acts in an apartment at Albany where the wealthy Earl of Harpenden, serving in wartime as an ordinary seaman, is about to marry his long-standing fiancée. Complications are caused by the arrival of two rival suitors an American airman and a Free French officer, Harpenden's prospective father-in-law and an old girlfriend.

== Original cast ==
The cast of the Globe Theatre production included Douglas Jefferies, Robert Long, Hugh McDermott, Jane Baxter, Ronald Squire, Eugene Deckers and Brenda Bruce.

== Critical reception ==
James Agate thought it “delightful, a little masterpiece of tingling impertinence”. and on Broadway, the New York Herald Tribune found "A gay drawing-room comedy has come romping to the rescue of the faltering season."

== Adaptation ==
In 1947 the play was turned into a film of the same title directed by Anthony Asquith, a frequent collaborator with Rattigan on various film projects.

== Bibliography ==
- John Russell Taylor. The Rise and Fall of the Well-Made Play. Routledge, 2013.
