= Lesley Storm =

Scottish writer (1898–1975)

Lesley Storm was the pen-name of Mabel Cowie (1898–1975), also known by her married name of Mabel Clark.

She was a Scottish writer, who wrote a number of plays, some of which were filmed. Black Chiffon and Roar Like a Dove were major hits. She also wrote several screenplays, including The Heart of the Matter (1953), based on the novel by Graham Greene, and The Spanish Gardener, based on the 1950 novel of the same name by A.J. Cronin.

She wrote some novels, the best known was Lady, What of Life? (Cassell, 1928). It depicted London social life in transition from Victorian to modern times.

== Selected filmography ==
- East of Piccadilly (1940)
- Banana Ridge (1942)
- Unpublished Story (1942)
- Alibi (1942)
- Flight from Folly (1945)
- Meet Me at Dawn (1947)
- White Cradle Inn (1947)
- The Fallen Idol (1948)
- Adam and Evelyne (1949)
- Golden Salamander (1950)
- The Ringer (1952)
- Personal Affair (1953)
- The Heart of the Matter (1953)
- The Spanish Gardener (1956)

== Selected plays ==
- Tony Draws a Horse (1938)
- Heart of the City (1942)
- Great Day (1945)
- Black Chiffon (1949)
- Roar Like a Dove (1962)
