= 1946 in British music =

This is a summary of 1946 in music in the United Kingdom.

== Events ==
- February – Kathleen Ferrier's recording contract with Columbia Records expires, and she transfers to Decca.
- 21 March – Swedish premiere of Peter Grimes, the opera's first performance outside the UK, in Stockholm.
- June – George Formby is awarded the Order of the British Empire in the 1946 King's Birthday Honours List.
- 5 July – Michael Tippett arranges the first British performance of Monteverdi's Vespers at Morley College, adding his own organ Preludio for the occasion.
- 6, 7 & 9 August – Leonard Bernstein conducts the first US performance of Peter Grimes at the Berkshire Music Center, Tanglewood.

== Popular music ==
- Geraldo and his Orchestra – "We'll Gather Lilacs" (Ivor Novello)
- Archie Lewis and The Geraldo Strings – "I Dream of You (More Than You Dream I Do)"
- "It's A Pity To Say Goodnight" – (Billy Reid)

== Classical music: new works ==
- Malcolm Arnold – Symphony for Strings, Opus 13
- Edmund Rubbra – Cello Sonata, Opus 60
- Michael Tippett – Little Music for String Orchestra
- Ralph Vaughan Williams – Concerto for Two Pianos and Orchestra, co-arranged with Joseph Cooper
- William Walton – String Quartet No. 2 in A minor

== Opera ==
- Benjamin Britten – The Rape of Lucretia

== Film and Incidental music ==
- William Alwyn – I See a Dark Stranger, starring Deborah Kerr and Trevor Howard.
- John Ireland – The Overlanders.
- Alan Rawsthorne – The Captive Heart, starring Michael Redgrave.

== Musical theatre ==
- 7 March – The London production of Song of Norway opens at the Palace Theatre and runs for 526 performances.
- 19 December – Noël Coward's new musical Pacific 1860 opens at the Theatre Royal, Drury Lane, starring Mary Martin and Graham Payn.

== Musical films ==
- Gaiety George, released July 22, starring Richard Greene and Ann Todd.
- I'll Turn to You, directed by Geoffrey Faithfull, starring Terry Randall and Don Stannard
- The Laughing Lady, directed by Paul L. Stein, starring Anne Ziegler and Webster Booth
- London Town, released September 30, starring Sid Fields, Greta Gynt, Petula Clark, Kay Kendall and Sonny Hale and featuring Tessie O'Shea and Beryl Davis.
- The Magic Bow, directed by Bernard Knowles, starring Stewart Granger and Phyllis Calvert

== Births ==
- 3 January – John Paul Jones (Led Zeppelin)
- 6 January – Syd Barrett (Pink Floyd) (died 2006)
- 10 January – Aynsley Dunbar, drummer and songwriter
- 22 January – Malcolm McLaren, impresario and founder of the Sex Pistols (died 2010)
- 7 March – Matthew Fisher (Procol Harum)
- 21 March – Ray Dorset (Mungo Jerry)
- 1 April – Ronnie Lane, singer, songwriter and guitarist (The Faces) (died 1997)
- 2 April – Raymond Gubbay, classical music promoter
- 4 April – Dave Hill, guitarist (Slade)
- 11 April – Bob Harris, DJ
- 10 May
  - Donovan, folk singer
  - Graham Gouldman, singer and songwriter (10cc)
  - Dave Mason, singer-songwriter and guitarist (Traffic and Fleetwood Mac)
- 15 May – Aly Bain, Scottish fiddler (The Boys of the Lough)
- 16 May – Robert Fripp, guitarist, composer and record producer
- 18 May – Bruce Gilbert, guitarist (Wire and Dome)
- 15 June – Noddy Holder, singer and songwriter (Slade)
- 30 June – Giles Swayne, composer
- 19 July – Alan Gorrie, Scottish singer and bass player (Average White Band and Forever More)
- 23 July – Andy Mackay, saxophonist, oboist, and composer
- 10 August – Peter Karrie, star of West End musical productions
- 1 September – Barry Gibb, singer and songwriter
- 5 September – Freddie Mercury, singer (Queen) (died 1991)
- 23 September – Duster Bennett, blues singer and musician (died 1976)
- 28 September – Helen Shapiro, singer
- 14 October
  - Justin Hayward, guitarist, singer and songwriter (The Moody Blues)
  - Dan McCafferty (Nazareth)
- 29 October – Peter Green, guitarist and singer
- 8 November – Roy Wood, singer and songwriter (The Move, Wizzard)
- 11 November – Chip Hawkes, vocalist and guitarist (The Tremeloes)
- 24 November – Bev Bevan, drummer (Electric Light Orchestra, Black Sabbath)
- 1 December – Gilbert O'Sullivan, singer-songwriter
- 10 December – Ace Kefford, bass player
- 12 December – Clive Bunker, drummer (Jethro Tull, Electric Sun, Solstice, and Aviator)
- 14 December – Jane Birkin, French-based actress and singer (died 2023)
- 16 December – Trevor Pinnock, harpsichordist and conductor
- 29 December – Marianne Faithfull, singer and actress (died 2025)

== Deaths ==
- 29 January – Sidney Jones, conductor and composer, 84
- 20 February – Hugh Allen, organist and choral conductor, 76
- 13 March – Thomas Dunhill, composer and music writer, 69
- 13 April – W. H. Bell, composer and conductor, 72
- 1 May
  - Edward Bairstow, organist and composer, 71
  - Percy Whitlock, organist and composer, 42 (tuberculosis)
- 16 October – Sir Granville Bantock, composer, 78
- 10 November – Nicholas Gatty, composer and music critic, 72
- 5 December – Tom Clare, music hall singer and pianist, 70
- 15 December – Frederic Norton, composer, 77

== See also ==
- 1946 in British television
- 1946 in the United Kingdom
- List of British films of 1946
