= List of British films of 1946 =

A list of films produced in the United Kingdom in 1946:

== A–Z ==
Title	Director	Cast	Genre	Notes
1946
Appointment with Crime	John Harlow	William Hartnell, Raymond Lovell, Joyce Howard	Crime	
Bedelia	Lance Comfort	Margaret Lockwood, Ian Hunter, Anne Crawford	Drama	
Beware of Pity	Maurice Elvey	Lilli Palmer, Albert Lieven, Cedric Hardwicke	Drama	
The Captive Heart	Basil Dearden	Michael Redgrave, Rachel Kempson, Jack Warner	War drama	
Caravan	Arthur Crabtree	Stewart Granger, Jean Kent, Anne Crawford	Melodrama	
Carnival	Stanley Haynes	Sally Gray, Michael Wilding, Jean Kent	Drama	
The Curse of the Wraydons	Victor M. Gover	Tod Slaughter, Bruce Seton, Ben Williams	Thriller	
Demobbed	John E. Blakeley	Norman Evans, Nat Jackley, Dan Young	Comedy	
Gaiety George	George King, Leontine Sagan	Richard Greene, Ann Todd, Hazel Court	Musical	
George in Civvy Street	Marcel Varnel	George Formby, Rosalyn Boulter, Ronald Shiner	Comedy	
A Girl in a Million	Francis Searle	Hugh Williams, Joan Greenwood, Basil Radford	Comedy	
The Grand Escapade	John Baxter	James Harcourt, Patric Curwen, Peter Bull	Family	
Great Expectations	David Lean	John Mills, Jean Simmons, Valerie Hobson	Literary drama	Number 5 in the list of BFI Top 100 British films
Green for Danger	Sidney Gilliat	Trevor Howard, Alastair Sim, Sally Gray	Mystery	
Here Comes the Sun	John Baxter	Bud Flanagan, Chesney Allen, Joss Ambler	Comedy	
I See a Dark Stranger	Frank Launder	Deborah Kerr, Trevor Howard, Raymond Huntley	Thriller	
I'll Turn to You	Geoffrey Faithfull	Terry Randall, Don Stannard, Harry Welchman	Musical	
The Laughing Lady	Paul L. Stein	Anne Ziegler, Webster Booth, Francis L. Sullivan	Musical	
Lisbon Story	Paul L. Stein	Patricia Burke, David Farrar, Walter Rilla	Musical thriller	
London Town	Wesley Ruggles	Sid Field, Greta Gynt, Petula Clark	Musical	
Loyal Heart	Oswald Mitchell	Percy Marmont, Harry Welchman, Patricia Marmont	Drama	
The Magic Bow	Bernard Knowles	Stewart Granger, Phyllis Calvert, Jean Kent	Musical biopic	
A Matter of Life and Death	Michael Powell, Emeric Pressburger	David Niven, Kim Hunter, Roger Livesey, Raymond Massey	World War II	Number 20 in the list of BFI Top 100 British films
Meet the Navy	Alfred Travers	Lionel Murton, Oscar Natzka, Alan Lund	Musical	
Men of Two Worlds	Thorold Dickinson	Robert Adams, Eric Portman, Orlando Martins	Drama	
Night Boat to Dublin	Lawrence Huntington	Robert Newton, Raymond Lovell, Muriel Pavlow	Thriller	
The Overlanders	Harry Watt	Chips Rafferty, John Nugent-Hayward, Daphne Campbell	Australian western	
Piccadilly Incident	Herbert Wilcox	Anna Neagle, Michael Wilding, Frances Mercer	Drama	
Quiet Weekend	Harold French	Derek Farr, Barbara White, Frank Cellier	Comedy	
School for Secrets	Peter Ustinov	Ralph Richardson, Raymond Huntley, David Tomlinson	War drama	
Send for Paul Temple	John Argyle	Anthony Hulme, Joy Shelton, Tamara Desni	Crime	
Spring Song	Montgomery Tully	Peter Graves, Carol Raye, Leni Lynn	Drama	
Tehran	Giacomo Gentilomo, William Freshman	Derek Farr, Marta Labarr, John Warwick	Thriller	
They Knew Mr. Knight	Norman Walker	Mervyn Johns, Nora Swinburne, Joyce Howard	Drama	
This Man Is Mine	Marcel Varnel	Tom Walls, Glynis Johns, Jeanne de Casalis	Comedy	
The Trojan Brothers	Maclean Rogers	Patricia Burke, David Farrar, Bobby Howes	Comedy	
Under New Management	John E. Blakeley	Nat Jackley, Norman Evans, Dan Young	Comedy	
The Voice Within	Maurice J. Wilson	Barbara White, Kieron Moore, Brefni O'Rorke	Crime	
Wanted for Murder	Lawrence Huntington	Eric Portman, Dulcie Gray, Derek Farr	Thriller	
The Years Between	Compton Bennett	Michael Redgrave, Valerie Hobson, Flora Robson	Drama	

== Documentaries and shorts ==
Title	Director	Cast	Genre	Notes
Bad Company	Paul Barrelet	Mabel Constanduros, Diana Dawson	Drama	
A Defeated People	Humphrey Jennings		Documentary	
Theirs Is the Glory	Terence Young	Stanley Maxted, Allan Wood	War	
The Voyage of Peter Joe	Harry Hughes	Brian Peck, Graham Moffatt	Family	

== See also ==
- 1946 in British music
- 1946 in British television
- 1946 in the United Kingdom
