= 1940 in British television =

This is a list of British television-related events from 1940.

== Events ==
British television did not broadcast in 1940. Television had been suspended since 1939 for the duration of the Second World War, due to fears that the signals would help German bombers. Television broadcasting resumed in 1946.

== Births ==
- 19 January – Mike Reid, entertainer, comedian and actor (died 2007)
- 22 January – John Hurt, actor (died 2017)
- 2 February – David Jason, born David White, actor
- 6 February – Jimmy Tarbuck, comedian
- 12 February – Ralph Bates, English actor (died 1991)
- 20 February – Jimmy Greaves, footballer and television pundit (died 2021)
- 22 February – Judy Cornwell, English actress
- 2 April – Penelope Keith, actress (died 2026)
- 10 April – Gloria Hunniford, Northern Irish television and radio presenter and singer
- 24 April – Chris Kelly, English television host and producer
- 7 June – Ronald Pickup, actor (died 2021)
- 16 June – Carole Ann Ford, actress
- 20 June – John Mahoney, actor (died 2018 in the United States)
- 22 June – Esther Rantzen, consumer affairs journalist, television presenter and campaigner (died 2026)
- 23 June – Adam Faith, born Terry Nelhams, pop singer, screen actor and financial journalist (died 2003)
- 27 June – Eric Richard, actor
- 11 July – Tommy Vance, born Richard Weston, DJ and TV music presenter (died 2005)
- 13 July – Patrick Stewart, actor (died 2026 in the United States)
- 17 July – Tim Brooke-Taylor, broadcast comedy performer (died 2020)
- 28 July – Brigit Forsyth, actress (died 2023)
- 31 July – Roy Walker, Northern Irish comedian
- 16 August – John Craven, journalist and television presenter
- 3 September – Pauline Collins, character actress
- 9 October – John Lennon, rock singer-songwriter, screen actor and activist (killed 1980 in the United States)
- 14 October
  - Cliff Richard, born Harry Webb in British India, pop singer and film actor
  - Christopher Timothy, Welsh actor, television director and writer
- 19 October – Michael Gambon, Irish-born actor (died 2023)
- 29 October – Jack Shepherd, actor, playwright, director and saxophonist
- 27 November – John Alderton, character actor
- 11 December – Tony Adams, Welsh actor (died 2025)

== See also ==
- 1940 in British music
- 1940 in the United Kingdom
- List of British films of 1940
