= Duke of Cornwall Hotel =

Hotel in Plymouth, Devon

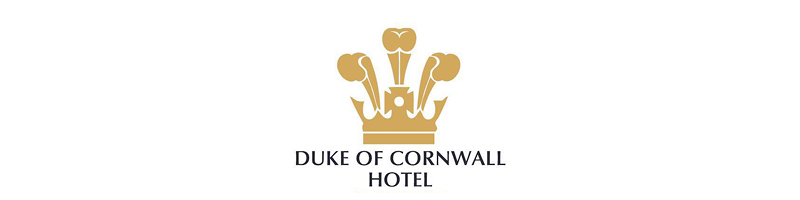

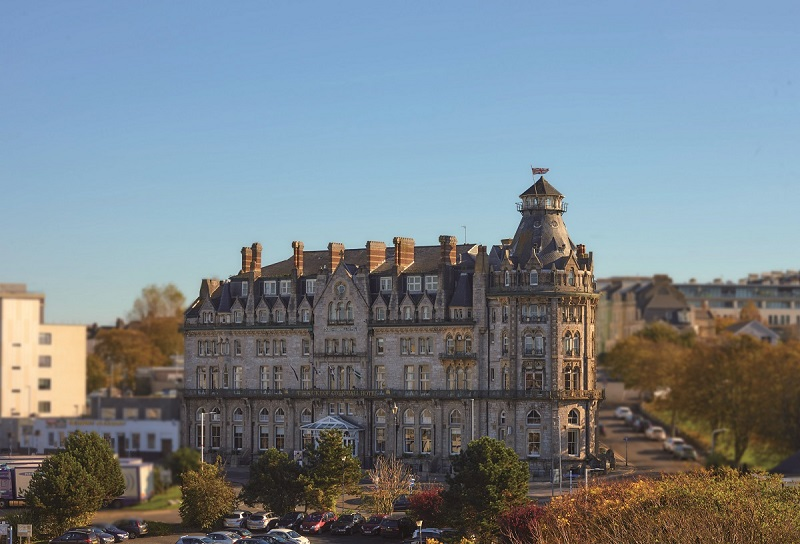
- The exterior of the Duke of Cornwall Hotel.

General information
- Location: Plymouth, Devon, England
- Coordinates: 50.3677001°N 4.1499031°W
- Opening: 1865
- Owner: Plymouth Hotel Company

Design and construction
- Architect: C. Forster Hayward

Other information
- Number of rooms: 72
- Number of restaurants: 1
- Parking: Available

Website
- www.thedukeofcornwall.co.uk
- Duke of Cornwall Hotel (Plymouth)

The Duke of Cornwall Hotel is a hotel in the city of Plymouth, Devon, England. It opened in 1865 to cater for the increasing number of travellers who were coming to the region by rail and sea.

The hotel survived the World War II Plymouth Blitz without damage, and was the venue for regular functions throughout the war. In the 1970s and early 1980s it was threatened with closure but, helped by poet laureate John Betjeman's praise for its architecture, it was saved by a major refurbishment.

== History ==
The Duke of Cornwall Hotel – 1922

The first steam train arrived at the now-closed Plymouth Millbay railway station on 2 April 1849. The increase of first class travel to the area led to an increasing demand for luxury accommodation and once the need for a quality hotel was recognised, a group of railway directors were appointed as the hotel's board of directors. They selected the architect C. Forster Hayward, who later designed the Swyddfa'r Sir in Aberystwyth to the same style but on a smaller scale. The builder was "Honest" John Pethick of Messers Hall and Pethick, who had already completed several jobs for the South Devon Railway Company including the rebuilding of Exeter St Thomas and Newton Abbot railway stations, and a hotel in Old Town Street in Plymouth.

Construction started in 1863 and the hotel opened in 1865. Five different types of stone were used to create the building in Victorian Gothic style. Owned by the Plymouth Hotel Company, the Duke of Cornwall cost £40,000 to develop including the excavation work required to clear the site where the Saracens Head Public House and Millbay Grove Terrace once stood.

=== The early 20th century ===
Twenty stewardesses returning from the United States after surviving the sinking of the RMS Titanic spent their first night ashore back in England at the hotel. This event was commemorated in an exhibition at the hotel in 2017.

Long-distance road travel was becoming a viable option in the 1920s and during the same period the number of ocean liner visits to Plymouth had doubled from 350 to 700 a year. Plymouth's location was attractive as it could cut a whole day in getting back to London by train rather than being continuing on the liner to Southampton. With this spare day the people were looking for accommodation and due to this increase in passing trade the hotel went through a thorough program of reconstruction and redecoration. Its lighting was electrified, a lift was installed, and the sanitary arrangements were certified by the local authority.

During the 1930s many celebrities came through Plymouth's Millbay Docks including Walt Disney, Charlie Chaplin, Duke Ellington and Bing Crosby. The number of liner visits peaked during the 1930s and the city looked to promote itself as a tourist destination. 1934 saw the memorial at the Mayflower Steps unveiled which promoted the Pilgrim Fathers link with America. The following year the Tinside Lido opened on the Hoe.

=== World War II ===
On 6 July 1940 the first air raid of the Plymouth Blitz took place and local people were aware of the city of Plymouth's importance to the enemy. With the large HMNB Devonport Naval base nearby, it was inevitable that this base would soon become a target. Over the next four years there were 59 separate assaults on the city. Thousands of homes and businesses were destroyed during that time making Plymouth one of the most bombed cities in the country.

Despite the bombing, the Duke of Cornwall hotel survived relatively unscathed, unlike the St James the Less Church and the Millbay railway station which stood either side of the hotel. Thanks to this dances took place in the ballroom every Wednesday and Saturday nights. They proved to be a welcome break from the pressure and fear that had become part of everyone's lives. American troops and local people alike attended these functions and wedding receptions were also held in the hotel. Guests were entertained by the likes of Anne Ziegler and Webster Booth and other artistes who were staying at the hotel whilst playing at the nearby Palace Theatre on Union Street.

According to the intelligence records of the MI5 and home office reports, the Welsh family that ran the hotel during the war had strong ties to the fascist party and was suspected by MI5 of gathering military intelligence from naval personnel. In particular, the manager's daughter-in-law was accused of taking American servicemen to her bedroom where she would coax sensitive military information from them after 'entertaining' them. On 10 February 1944 Mrs Welsh and her daughter-in-law Bebe were placed on the suspects list. In March she and her husband had a restriction order which prohibited their presence in an aliens protected area. They had been watched from at least 1939 but it was not until 1944 that they were forced to leave before the Allied invasion of France in the spring of 1944, MI5 recommended their detention.

=== Recent history ===
The hotel, which had been listed as Grade II in 1975, faced various challenges. In 1977 a local newspaper article claimed that: "Plymouth's 114-year-old Duke of Cornwall Hotel which kept the tourism flag flying in Queen Victoria's days and defied the wrath of Hitler's bombs, is in danger of being pulled down". In 1987 another article reported that "Plymouth's last grand Victorian Hotel is up for sale". The hotel was described by Sir John Betjeman as "one of the finest examples of Victorian gothic architecture he had ever seen". In 1988 its future was secured and a refurbishment programme followed.

There was a temporary closure in 2020 due to the COVID-19 pandemic. The hotel's operator, Bespoke Hotels, who were the tenants of the hotel announced on 4 February 2021 that it would close the operations. More than 50 staff were made redundant, and people who had paid deposits on weddings at the hotel were left out of pocket. On 28 May 2021 the hotel's owners have immediately appointed RBH Hotels as the new management company and re-opened, at which time many of the staff who were previously made redundant were re-employed

== Famous guests ==
In August 1914 Ernest Shackleton stayed in the hotel the night before his Imperial Trans-Antarctic Expedition. The hotel has a guest bedroom named "Shackleton Room" to commemorate this connection.

Other names in the visitors book include Tommy Trinder, Anne Ziegler, Isobel Barnett, Magnus Magnusson, David Dimbleby, and Webster Booth. In 1954 Laurel and Hardy were due to perform for a week at the Palace Theatre. But they were forced to cancel after the first night on 17 May due to Oliver Hardy suffering from flu and a mild heart attack. Owing to its proximity to the train station opposite, the hotel has attracted visits from various other celebrities including Charlie Chaplin who would take the train from London then sail back to New York City from the docks at Millbay.

== Facilities and accreditations ==
The Duke of Cornwall has 72 bedrooms and suites, including the Tower Suite, which gave a 360 degree view of the surrounding city, coast and countryside. The hotel is regularly used as a venue for conferences, private functions and weddings and is an approved marriage ceremony venue.

In 2018 the hotel has a one star (Recommended) rating from Frommer's. The hotel has three stars and was awarded two rosettes for culinary excellence from the AA.
