= Balsom =

Balsom is a surname. Notable people with the surname include:

- Alison Balsom (born 1978), English classical trumpeter
- Cliff Balsom (born 1946), English footballer
- Riley Balsom, Canadian politician

== Fictional characters ==
- Rex Balsom, a character on the American soap opera One Life to Live
- Roxy Balsom, a character on the American soap opera One Life to Live
