= Olga Edwardes =

South African actress (1915–2008)

- Edwardes in Scrooge (1951)
- Born: Olga Florence Solomon; 20 May 1915; Johannesburg, South Africa
- Died: 23 July 2008 (aged 93); Elstree, Hertfordshire, England
- Occupation: Actress
- Spouses: Anthony Baerlein (m. 1941; KIA 1941) Nicholas Davenport (m. 1946; died 1979)
- Father: Joseph Michael Solomon

Olga Edwardes (born Olga Florence Solomon; 20 May 1915 – 23 July 2008) was a South African actress.

== Personal life ==
Edwardes father was Joseph Michael Solomon, an architect of Herbert Baker, but he committed suicide in 1920 at the age of 33 in Cape Town.

Her mother was Jean Cox, a South African actress who was a divorcée when she married Solomon in 1914 in Cape Town. Olga had a brother named Paul.

Her mother married again in Cape Town in 1922 to Hugh Edwards, a company secretary, who became Olga and Paul's stepfather.

Olga married P/O Anthony Max Baerlein in 1941; he was killed in action later the same year. (Note: Her marriage certificate was given as 'Edwards'. Both mother and brother styled their surname as "Edwardes" when they arrived in England.)

In 1946, she married her second husband Nicholas Davenport. (Note: "Nicholas Davenport". Oxford Dictionary of National Biography (online ed.). OUP. doi:10.1093/ref:odnb/31005. (Subscription, Wikipedia Library access or UK public library membership required.)) an economist and journalist who was more than twenty years her senior. He died in 1979; she died in Elstree, England, in 2008.

=== Filmography ===
Year	Title	Role	Notes
1936	The Amateur Gentleman	Maid at inn	Uncredited
1936	The Man Who Could Work Miracles	minor role	Uncredited
1937	The Dominant Sex	Lucy Webster	
1937	Over She Goes	Reprimanded maid	Uncredited
1940	Contraband	Mrs Abo	
1945	Caesar and Cleopatra	Cleopatra's lady attendant	
1950	The Angel with the Trumpet	Monica Alt	
1951	The Six Men	Christina	
1951	Scrooge	Fred's wife	She played the unnamed wife of Scrooge's nephew Fred
1953	Black Orchid	Christine Shaw	She was a principal character

=== Theatre work ===
Repertory

- This is where Edwardes learned stagecraft. In Oxford rep there is a new play every week, including one that she took a bow in Romeo and Juliet with John Byron.
- In the Royal Shakespeare Company, during the first half of 1936, at the new Memorial Theatre, Stratford-on-Avon:

Twelfth Night	Olivia
Much Ado About Nothing	Hero
The Taming of the Shrew	Bianca
The Rivals	Julia Melville
Richard II	Queen Isabella
The Tempest	Miranda
The Merchant of Venice	Jessica

- During the war, she spent a year with the BBC Repertory Company.

West End

- As You Like It – Open Air 1934 – the stage débuts of Olga Edwardes and Frank Tickle
- Party 1860 – Open Air 1934
- Androcles and the Lion – Open Air 1934 – George Bernard Shaw watched it on its first night
- Romeo and Juliet – Open Air 1934
- Young Madame Conti – Savoy 1936
- Tsar Lenin – Westminster Theatre, 1936 – 1937
- Punch without Judy – New Theatre 1939
- Peril at End House, "Nick" Buckley, opened at Brighton, then Richmond and then moved to Vaudeville but only 38 performances in May 1940
- Twelfth Night – just two matinees for Twelfth Night holiday, on 30 Dec 1940 and 31 Dec 1940
- Landslide, Marian, Westminster – opened in 5 Oct 1943 until 6 Nov 1943
- Grand National Night – Apollo, 1946 – 1947

=== TV work ===
Before the war

Edwardes was an early player in the fledgling BBC television service, which started in November 1936 until it closed at the beginning of the War, and didn't restart until 1946. She also deputised as a television announcer when Elizabeth Cowell was on leave in 1939.

•	Full Moon	(25 Oct 1937)
	A revue for television, written by Archie Harradine	
	Writer	Archie Harradine
	Music composed by	Herbert Murrill
	Producer	Eric Crozier
	[Actor]	Guy Glover
	[Actor]	Rudolf Brandt
	[Actress]	Olga Edwardes
	[Actor]	Archie Harradine
	Pianist	Margaret Good
	Pianist	Herbert Murrill

•	The Sacred Cat	(12 Feb 1938)
	A comedy by F. Sladen-Smith.	
	Author	F. Sladen-Smith
	Starring	The Lanchester Marionettes (Note: With thanks to Simon Vaughan, Alexandra Palace Television Society for the following information: "Olga first appeared on 12 February 1938 as The Maiden in The Lanchester Marionettes. She appeared in a number of drama productions before being listed as an announcer from 30 March 1939, with her last appearance as an announcer on 20 August 1939. I have an audio recording of her in-vision announcement for 3 August 1939.")

•	Gallows Glorious	(18 Nov 1938)
	Adaptation for television of the play by Ronald Gow. The action takes place in America in 1859 and moves between John Brown's house in the Adirondack mountains in the North, and the Maryland–Virginia border in the South.	
	Writer	Ronald Gow
	Production	Jan Bussell
	John Brown	Neil Porter
	Rest of cast listed alphabetically:	Audrey Cameron; Deirdre Doyle; Olga Edwardes; Morland Graham; Walter Horsburgh; Stephen Jack; Eugene Leahy; Brian Melland; Bernard Merefield; Rupert Siddons; Larry Silverstone

•	Hay Fever	(25 Dec 1938)
	A light comedy in three acts by Noël Coward; The action of the play takes place in the hall of the Blisses' house at Cookham, in June.	
	Writer	Noël Coward
	Settings	Malcolm Baker-Smith
	Production	Reginald Smith
	Judith Bliss	Kitty De Legh
	David Bliss	Maurice Denham
	Sorel Bliss	Olga Edwardes
	Simon Bliss	Guy Verney
	Myra Arundel	Fabia Drake
	Richard Greatham	Noël Howlett
	Jackie Coryton	Doreen Oscar billed Jenny Laird
	Sandy Tyrrell	John Byron
	Clara	Veronica Brady

•	Dance Without Music	(23 Mar 1939)
	A play based upon episodes in the life of Jack Sheppard, by Mervyn Mills.	
	Writer	Mervyn Mills
	Settings	Malcolm Baker-Smith
	Production	Denis Johnston
	Jack Sheppard	Guy Glover
	Jonathan Wild	Frank Birch
	'Edgeworth Bess'	Kathleen Edwardes
	'Blueskin' Blake	George Merritt
	Joseph Hind	Ben Field
	Mrs Wallop	Margaret Yarde
	Polly Maggot	Olga Edwardes
	Daniel Defoe	Ian Dawson
	Jenkin	Basil Cunard
	Lumley Davis	Stuart Latham
	John Gay	James Hayter
	Abraham Mendez	Don Gemmell
	Austin	Adrian Byrne
	Ballad Singer	Elton Hayes
	Sir James Thornhill	Arthur Owen
	Ben Hind	Russell Howarth
	Constable	Kenneth Barton

•	The Young Idea	(24 Feb 1939)
	A comedy in three acts by Noël Coward; The scene is laid in George Brent's house in England, and Jennifer Brent's villa in Italy	
	Writer	Noël Coward
	Settings	Malcolm Baker-Smith
	Production	Reginald Smith
	George Brent	Cecil Winter
	Gerda	Olga Edwardes
	Sholto	Kenneth Morgan
	Jennifer	Kitty De Legh
	Cicely	Dorothy Black
	Priscilla Hartleberry	Phoebe Kershaw
	Claude Eccles	William Hutchison
	Julia Cragworthy	Lena Maitland
	Eustace Dabbit	Alban Blakelock
	Sibyl Blaith	Audrey Cameron
	Rodney Masters	Thorley Walters
	Huddle	Hugh Casson
	Hiram J. Walkin	Morris Harvey

•	Condemned to be Shot	(4 Mar 1939)
	A play in the first person by R. E. J. Brooke	
	Writer	R. E. J. Brooke
	Production	Jan Bussell
	Officer	Reginald Brooke
	Maria Walska	Zoe Davies
	Sonya Pavlovna	Olga Edwardes
	Volberg	Wilfred Fletcher
	Voice of Gregor Walievski	Neil Porter
	Vasiloff	Hilary Pritchard
	Borgoff	Ben Soutten

::(She was also listed as an announcer on 30 March 1939, until her last appearance on 20 August 1939.

•	Two Gentlemen of Soho	(28 Apr 1939)
	Writer	A. P. Herbert
	Production	Stephen Thomas
	Plum	Robert Atkins
	Sneak	Harold Scott
	Hubert	Charles Peters
	Laetitia	Nadine March
	Topsy	Olga Edwardes
	Waiter	Roy Graham
	Duchess of Canterbury	Barbara Everest

•	The Parnell Commission	(18 Jul 1939)
	A reconstruction of the famous forgery investigation of 1888–89	
	Producer	Denis Johnston
	Piggott	Eliot Makeham
	Sir Charles Russel	Felix Aylmer
	Parnell	Mark Dignam
	Attorney General	Wilfrid Walter
	Eye Witness	Brefni O'Rorke
	Mrs O'Shea	Olga Edwardes
	President of the Court	Graveley Edwards
	Timothy Harrington	Blake Giffard
	Doctor Maguire	Nigel Fitzgerald
	Henniker Heaton	Lionel Dymoke
	Frank Hugh O'Donnell	Harry Hutchinson
	Court Registrar	Leo McCabe
	Captain O'Shea	Charles Oliver
	Friend	Micheline Patton
	Servant at Eltham	Moya Devlin
	Solicitor's Clerk	Russell Hogarth
	Spanish Policeman	Rafael Terry
	Reporter; Houston's Voice	Kenneth Barton
	[Actor]	Jack Clifford

Restarting in 1946

•	Lovers' Meeting OR A Handbook to Courting	(12 Nov 1947)
	A miscellany compiled and edited by Barbara Nixon.	
	Writer / Producer	Desmond Davis
	Music arranger / conductor	William Cox-Ife
	Dances	Donald Journeaux
	Settings	James Bould
	Compiled and edited	Barbara Nixon
	Performers	Robert Beaumont; Billie Baker; Grey Blake; Olga Edwardes; Dennis Bowen; Christine Lindsay; Hugh Burden; Barbara Lott; Dick Francis; Barbara Nixon; Richard Hurndall; Ambrosine Phillpotts; Desmond Walter-Ellis; Joan White

•	The Middle Watch	(5 Feb 1948)
	A Romance of the Navy by Ian Hay and Stephen King-Hall; The scene is laid in the Captain's lobby and day cabin on board H.M.S. Falcon, a cruiser on the China Station	
	Writer	Ian Hay; Stephen King-Hall
	Producer	Ian Atkins
	Marine Ogg	Johnnie Schofield
	Ah Fong	Milo Sperber
	Captain Randall R.M.	Christopher Quest
	Fay Eaton	Olga Edwardes
	A guest	Carol Peters
	Flag Lieutenant R.N.	Philip Howard
	Nancy Hewitt	Honor Shepherd
	Commander Baddeley R.N.	Richard Hurndall
	Charlotte Hopkinson	Rita Daniel
	Admiral Sir Hercules Hewitt KCB	H. G. Stoker
	Mary Carlton	Miki Hood
	Lady Hewitt	Ruth Taylor
	An able seaman	Gerald Campion
	Captain Maitland R.N.	Lawrence O'Madden
	Corporal Duckett R.M.	Frank Forsythe

•	I Killed the Count	(14 Mar 1948)
	A comedy thriller by Alec Coppel Also at the bottom of p26 there are photos of five of the actors: Olga Edwardes, Arthur Goulett, Guy Poynter, Howard Douglas and Frank Foster	
	Writer	Alec Coppel
	Producer	Ian Atkins
	Polly	Freda Bamford
	Count Victor Mattoni	Philip Leaver
	Detective Sergeant Raines	Frederick Bradshaw
	Detective Inspector Davidson	Frank Foster
	Martin	Erik Chitty
	P.C. Clifton	Diarmuid Kelly
	Louise Rogers	Olga Edwardes
	Renee la Lune	Mildred Shay
	Samuel Diamond	Val Norton
	Johnson	Howard Douglas
	Mullet	Arthur Goulett
	Bernard K Froy	Guy Kingsley Poynter
	Viscount Sorrington	Bruce Belfrage

•	At the Villa Rose	(28 Nov 1948)
	The detective story by A. E. W. Mason; Adapted as a television play by Gilbert Thomas.	
	Author	A. E. W. Mason
	Adapter	Gilbert Thomas
	Producer	Ian Atkins
	Settings	James Bould
	Julius Ricardo	Erik Chitty
	Celia Harland	Olga Edwardes
	Harry Wethermill	John Arnatt
	Madame Dauvray	Selma Vaz Dias
	Adele Rossignol	Ambrosine Phillpotts
	M. Hanaud	Antony Holle
	Servettaz	Robert Cawdron
	Sgt. Perrichet	David Ward
	M. Besnard	George de Warfaz
	Helene Vauquier	Nicolette Bernard
	Marthe Gobin	Helen Misener
	M. Lemerre	Percy Walsh
	Other parts played by	Sheila Beckett; Ethel Ramsay; Patrick Troughton; Peter Raymonde; George Holst

•	October Horizon	(11 Jul 1950)
	A play by Lydia Ragosin	
	Author	Lydia Ragosin
	Adapter	Gilbert Thomas
	Settings	James Bould
	Producer	Kenneth M. Buckley
	Edward Tarrant	Jack Livesey
	Laura, his wife	Mary Hinton
	Charles	Ian Lubbock
	Caroline	Ursula Howells
	Joel	Cavan Malone
	Louis Brahms	Fritz Krenn
	Sarah French	Olga Edwardes
	Doctor	Arthur Lucas

•	A Scandal in Bohemia	(27 Oct 1951)
	Adapted by C. A. Lejeune.	
	Author	Arthur Conan Doyle
	Adapted by	C. A. Lejeune
	Settings	James Bould
	Producer	Ian Atkins
	Sherlock Holmes	Alan Wheatley
	Dr Watson	Raymond Francis
	The King of Bohemia	Alan Judd
	Irene Adler	Olga Edwardes
	Godfrey Norton	John Stevens
	Mrs Hudson	Iris Vandeleur
	Housekeeper	Betty Turner
	Old cabby	Michael Raghan
	Young cabby	Donald Kemp
	Ostlers	Meadows White; John Fitzgerald; Vernon Gibb
	Others taking part	Pamela Barnard; Antony Beaumont; John Boddington; Eric Dodson; Alexis Milne; Florence Viner; Donald Whittle

•	Au Clair de la Lune	(29 Jul 1954)
	Au Clair de la Lune; A play by Antonia Ridge; France 1650; This is a story of two boys and a song. The first boy is Louis XIV, King of France; he is eleven years old, and must live a wearisome existence in great palaces under strict supervision from such eminent adults as his cousin, the great Mademoiselle, and his leading statesman, my Lord the Cardinal. Louis has learned painfully that little kings are not as other little boys. But our other boy, although older, is hardly less unhappy; he's Jean-Baptiste Lulli, one day to be a famous musician, but now an Italian orphan who earns a living by playing his violin for a travelling players' show. And this is also the story of a magnificent banquet which Mademoiselle gives for her young royal relative; for by a series of happy accidents the two boys meet at the banquet, and the occasion is marked by the first performance of one of the loveliest and most famous songs ever written.	
	Author	Antonia Ridge
	Designer	Richard Henry
	Producer	Campbell Logan
	Louis	Michael Caridia
	Jean-Baptiste Lulli	John Cairney
	Hercule Cocarel	Raymond Rollett
	Françoise, his daughter	Perlita Neilson
	Mademoiselle de Montpensier	Olga Edwardes
	The Maestro	Anthony Pini
	Master Bounaire	Charles Heslop
	Frimousset, a clown	Ivan Staff
	A footman	Charles Maunsell
	A kitchen lad	Anthony Marriott
	Cardinal Mazarin	Keith Pyott
	First aristocrat	Sylvia Willoughby
	Second aristocrat	Philip Howard

•	Family Business	(30 Oct 1955)
	The third in a cycle of four plays entitled "The Makepeace Story" by Frank and Vincent Tilsley. The action takes place in and around Shawcross, Lancashire, and in France, between the years 1914-1920.	
	Writer	Frank Tilsley; Vincent Tilsley
	Designer	Stephen Bundy
	Producer	Tony Richardson
	Colonel Harry Makepeace	Charles Carson
	Mrs Dolly Makepeace	Rachel Kempson
	Sir Timothy Baines	D. A. Clarke-Smith
	Christine	Margherita Parry
	Geoffrey Kenyon	Clive Revill
	Oswald Makepeace	Rodney Diak
	Margery Baines	Helena Hughes
	Peter Makepeace	Ian Bannen
	Sichiro	Tom Tan
	Mill girl	Rosemary Davis
	Maggie	Jocelyn Page
	Military recruit	John Osborne; Stephen Dartnell; Alex Scott
	Sergeant at Recruiting Office	Reginald Hearne
	Doctor	Owen Berry
	Bill Holbrooke	Anthony Doonan
	Tyson	George A. Cooper
	Sergeant in shell crater	Peter Duguid
	French girl	Jacqueline D'Orsay
	People at party	Glen Farmer; Fanny Carby; Delia Paton; Howard Lang; Julie Somers
	Jackson	Nigel Davenport
	Waiter	Jeremy Geidt
	Vera	Olga Edwardes
	Landlord of Pack Horse Inn	Charles Hersee
	Mill operative	Howell Davies; Alan Townsend; James Wellman
	Bailiff's clerk	Lane Meddick
	Other parts played by	Anthony Broughton; Grant Duprez; Pamela Hern; Arthur Hosking; Cyril Renison; George Ricarde; Maggie Smith; Caspar Wrede; Margery Caldicott; Stuart Mitchell

== Years 1956–2008 ==
Since her marriage in 1946, she led a new career, as salonnière in the house of Hinton Waldrist manor. Her husband had bought it in 1922, (Note: and he lives there until he dies in 1979,) and together they entertained and held court to influential and radical artists, economists, philosophers, and politicians of the day at grand gatherings. Both she and her husband were long-time leading Fabians – she had known Harold Laski for some time. Nicholas Davenport worked with Alexander Korda then joined Harold Wilson with the National Film Finance Corporation. Even though a Fabian, (Note: In 1932 he was one of the founders of the XYZ Club to advise the Labour Party on economic and financial matters. The XYZ Club was a select dining club which brought City figures into contact with Labour's financial experts, such as Hugh Dalton, Evan Durbin, Douglas Jay. And Nicholas Davenport of course. Hugh Gaitskell for instance, was an early member but not a founder.) he still kept friendships with R. J. G. Boothby and was close to Winston Churchill.

Olga Davenport continued the social activity of salon gathering which had been part of history for more than 350 years. (Note: Even as early as Mary Sidney in the beginning of the 17th century, she turned Wilton House into a salon-type literary group sustained by the Countess's hospitality, and which included Edmund Spenser, Samuel Daniel, Michael Drayton, Ben Jonson, and Sir John Davies. John Aubrey wrote that "Wilton House was like a college, there were so many learned and ingenious persons. She was the greatest patroness of wit and learning of any lady in her time." The Wilton Circle was an influential group of 16th-century English poets.) "She was, as a young woman, an astounding beauty. She was also an impressive creative force. It is a heady combination. Men chucked caution to the wind." There is a bust of 'Olga' by the sculptor F. E. McWilliam; two portrait drawings of her in her art collection by Theyre Lee‑Elliott, and another gouache drawing of her dancing also by Lee‑Elliott, with a verse by the artist on the reverse dedicated to her. His was not the only verse inspired by Olga's muse: another was from A. P. Herbert on the train to and back from Frinton-on-Sea.

Is he so mad who travels to the shore
Then back at once to where he was before?
Does not the ocean under Olga's sway,
Commit the same sweet folly twice a day?
Thus the mad fish pursue the moon in vain,
But will, as happily, pursue again.
Thus climbers, having made the steep ascent,
Salute the stars, and then return – content

She had been trained in painting, and returned to that art form following her acting career. In fact when she entered into the theatre, between performances she studied at the Westminster School of Art with Mark Gertler and through him and his wife, (Note: In fact by 1938 the marriage between Mark Gertler and his wife Marjorie Greatorex Hodgkinson was often difficult, punctuated by the frequent ill health of both. In 1939, Gertler committed suicide.) met Matthew Smith and Ivon Hitchens. In 1956, following a career as an actor with mostly minor roles in films, she returned to studying fine art and painting at the Chelsea Polytechnic; at the Royal College of Art; and at Peter Lanyon's school in St Ives, Cornwall. Davenport was not merely an accomplished artist, or a collector; but her deep friendships with British artists from the 1950s onwards placed Davenport as a key and perhaps surprisingly influential figure in the British art scene of the time. In St Ives, Davenport was to meet and befriend some of the greatest British artists of the 20th century and during her life she acquired important paintings for her own collection, including works by Patrick Heron, Roger Hilton, Terry Frost, and William Scott. She spent hours at Eagle's Nest, and Elm Tree Cottage. She sat on the board of the Bear Lane Gallery and formed relationships with influential people such as Clement Greenberg and Pauline Vogelpoel. She had a studio in the south of France. (Note: Olga Davenport (1915-2008) An Olive Grove, Mougins oil on canvas Painted in 1966.)

She exhibited with the London Group and with the Women's International Art Club. She had shown in a number of group exhibitions including an Arts Council tour, at the Leicester Galleries, at the Whitechapel, the A. I. A., the Drian Gallery, Galerie Creuse, Paris, Athens School of Fine Arts, 'Women in the Arts Today' at the Northampton Museum and Art Gallery, the Bear Lane Gallery in Oxford, Grabowski Gallery, and at the Demarco Gallery.

She had two one-person shows at the Piccadilly Gallery in London's Cork Street in 1969, (Note: 'Cliff, sun and sea' signed 'Olga Davenport. (on the reverse) and signed and indistinctly inscribed 'CLIFF, SUN AND ****/OLGA DAVENPORT/44 MARKHAM SQ./SW3' (on a fragmentary exhibition label attached to the stretcher)—oil on canvas 35¾ x 47½ in. (89.8 x 120.7 cm.) I went into the Gallery last week and I thought again how beautiful your pictures look, quiet, personal, bold without aggression, lyrical colour, you have arrived at something very much your own, they are right. Pictures are either right or wrong and no one can really say why. — (letter from William Scott to Olga Davenport, hand-written and dated 6th May 1969) This is how William Scott described Olga Davenport's paintings at her first one-woman show at the Piccadilly Gallery in 1969.) and in 1976; (Note: The work was included in Olga Davenport's second show at The Piccadilly Gallery, 1976. Olga Davenport said of her work then "In front of a landscape today the modern artist is aware of a conflict between her subjective feelings and the detachment needed to create a work which will be a plastic object in its own right. I have tried to resolve this conflict and present a synthesis by using colour relationships to suggest space and rhythm, and minimal figuration to present a sense of place.") and in 1978 she had a solo show of oils at the Oxford Gallery. (Note: Signed and inscribed 'Olga Davenport/'Tuscan Landscape' (on the reverse), oil on canvas 26 x 37 in. (66 x 94 cm) No. 21 Exhibited Oxford, Oxford Gallery, Olga Davenport, February – March 1978. From the Collection of the late Olga Davenport.)

Her later work was mainly concerned with the depiction of landscape, and is recognised for the use of gentle, yet dynamic colours which reduce forms to abstracted shapes. She used broad, fluid brushstrokes of colour to capture the outlines of natural environments. The painted landscapes embody a delicate compromise between the wholly self-involved abstraction of modernist formalism and a fascination with the experience and representation of the natural world. Her works are in the permanent collections of the Nuffield Foundation, St Anne's College, Oxford, University of Warwick, Department of the Environment, and in private collections in England, Switzerland, South Africa, Belgium and the United States of America.

After her death, her art collection auctioned around £550,000 (equivalent to £877,600 in 2025).

== Sources ==
1. Allenby, Richard, ed. (2019). "Whitley Z9145 at Givendale, Ripon". Archived from the original on 23 April 2019.
2. Baerlein, Anthony Max (1936). Daze, the Magician. Arthur Barker. Archived from the original on 29 April 2019.
3. CWGC (1941). "Commonwealth War Graves".
4. "Sale 5883: 20th Century British Art including The Olga Davenport Collection". Christie's. 25 March 2009. Archived from the original on 28 April 2019.
5. Oxford Mail, George Gaynor (23 March 2009). "Oxfordshire woman's art collection goes under hammer". Archived from the original on 10 May 2019.
6. Scott, Elisabeth (1932). "Shakespeare Memorial Theatre". Archived from the original on 14 October 2014.
7. Sladen-Smith, Francis (1928). The Sacred Cat, A Play in One Act, Repertory Plays, No. 85. Illustrated – Alan G MacNaughton. London & Glasgow: Gowans & Gray.
8. The Times (4 September 2008). "Obituary". London, England. p. 66.
9. Walker, Joanna, ed. (1984). "SOLOMON, Joseph Michael". Artefacts: the Built Environment of Southern Africa. U Pretoria. Archived from the original on 13 November 2017.
10. Winters, Edward (2009). "Chapter 1 Olga Davenport: the woman". Olga Davenport. Archived from the original on 1 February 2011.
