= 1939 in British television =

This is a list of British television related events from 1939.

== Events ==
=== March ===
- 4 March – The BBC Television Service broadcasts one of the first plays to be written especially for television, Condemned To Be Shot by R. E. J. Brooke. The production is notable for the use of a camera as the first-person perspective of the play's unseen central character.
- 27 March – The BBC Television Service broadcasts the entirety of Magyar Melody live from His Majesty's Theatre, London. The 175-minute broadcast is the first showing of a full-length musical on television.

=== May ===
- May – The BBC Television Service broadcasts the entirety of the musical Me and My Girl live from the Victoria Palace Theatre, London; it is rebroadcast in July.

=== July ===
- 8 July – The BBC Television has no more coverage of Wimbledon until 1946.
- 20 July – The George Bernard Shaw historical drama The Man of Destiny is shown on BBC Television.

=== August ===
- 31 August – 18,999 television sets have been sold in Britain before manufacture stops during World War II.

=== September ===
- 1 September – The anticipated outbreak of World War II brings television broadcasting at the BBC Television Service to an end at 12:35pm after the broadcast of a Mickey Mouse cartoon, Mickey's Gala Premier and various sound and vision test signals. It is feared that the VHF waves of television would act as a perfect homing signal for guiding enemy bombers to central London: in any case, the engineers of the television service would be needed for the war effort, particularly for radar. The BBC Television Service will resume its broadcasting with the same Mickey Mouse cartoon after the war in 1946.

=== October to December ===
- No television is broadcast for the remainder of the War.

=== Date unknown ===
- Future presenter, actor, comedian, singer, dancer and screenwriter Bruce Forsyth makes his first on-screen appearance at the age of eleven on the BBC talent show Come and be televised.

== Debuts ==
- 1 January – Marco Millions (1939)
- 4 January – The Tell-Tale Heart (1939)
- 4 March – Condemned To Be Shot (1939)
- 19 March – Gaslight (1939)
- 27 March – Magyar Melody (1939)
- 2 June – The Anatomist (1939)
- 9 July – The Fame of Grace Darling (1939)
- 29 July – Prison Without Bars (1939)
- 12 August – Private Lives (1939)
- Unknown – BBC Cricket (1939, 1946–1999, 2020–2024)

== Television shows ending before the war ==
=== 1920s ===
- BBC Wimbledon (1927–1939, 1946–2019, 2021–2024)

=== 1930s ===
- Picture Page (1936–1939, 1946–1952)
- The Disorderly Room (1937–1939)
- For the Children (1937–1939, 1946–1952)
- Telecrime (1938–1939, 1946)
- The Boat Race (1938–1939, 1946–2019)
- BBC Cricket (1939, 1946–1999, 2020–2024)

== Births ==
- 10 February – Peter Purves, actor and television presenter
- 9 March – John Howard Davies, child actor and comedy director (died 2011)
- 24 March – Lynda Baron, actress (died 2022)
- 7 April – David Frost, satirist, writer, journalist and television presenter (died 2013)
- 16 April – Donald MacCormick, Scottish-born broadcast journalist and television presenter (died 2009)
- 27 April – Judy Carne, actress (Rowan and Martin's Laugh-In) (died 2015)
- 2 May – Peter Dean, actor (EastEnders)
- 24 June – Annette Andre, Australian actress
- 9 August – Vincent Hanna, Northern Ireland-born television journalist (died 1997)
- 16 August – Trevor McDonald, Trinidadian-born newsreader and journalist
- 17 August – Anthony Valentine, actor (died 2015)
- 30 August – John Peel, disc jockey and radio and television presenter (died 2004)
- 26 September – Ricky Tomlinson, actor
- 28 September – Rudolph Walker, Trinidadian actor
- 7 October – Clive James, Australian-born writer, television presenter, talk show host and critic (died 2019)
- 27 October – John Cleese, comic actor
- 31 October – Tom O'Connor, game show host, comedian and actor (died 2021)
- 8 November
  - Liz Dawn, actress (Coronation Street) (died 2017)
  - Meg Wynn Owen, actress (Upstairs, Downstairs) (died 2022)
- 18 November – John Pitman, reporter (died 2018)
- 21 December – Malcolm Hebden, actor (Coronation Street)

== See also ==
- 1939 in British music
- 1939 in the United Kingdom
- List of British films of 1939
