= 1946 in British television =

This is a list of British television related events from 1946.

British television broadcasts resumed this year. They had been suspended during World War II, for fear that the signals would help German bombers.

== Events ==
=== January – May ===
- No broadcasts: British television remains off the air.

=== June ===
- 1 June – The first television licence is introduced in the United Kingdom, costing £2.
- 7 June – The BBC Television Service begins broadcasting again. The first words heard are "Good afternoon everybody. How are you? Do you remember me, Jasmine Bligh?". The Mickey Mouse cartoon Mickey's Gala Premier that had been the last programme transmitted seven years earlier at the start of World War II, is reshown later in the re-opening programme.
- 29 June – BBC's coverage of Wimbledon returns, after not being seen since 1939 due to the service's discontinuation during World War II. It was among the earliest pre-war programming on the BBC Television Service, annual coverage of the event debuting in 1927.

=== July ===
- 7 July – The BBC's children's programme For the Children returns, one of the few pre-war programmes to resume after the reintroduction of the BBC Television Service.

=== August ===
- 4 August – Children's puppet Muffin the Mule makes his first appearance in an episode of For The Children.

=== October ===
- 19 October – The first live televised post-war football match is broadcast by the BBC. Twenty minutes of Barnet's home game against Wealdstone are televised in the first half and thirty five minutes of the second half before it becomes too dark.
- 22 October – Telecrime, which first aired over five episodes in 1938 and 1939, and is the first television crime series, returns for a 12-episode series on the BBC Television Service, retitled Telecrimes.

=== November ===
- 29 November – Pinwright's Progress, British television's first sitcom, is broadcast for the first time on the BBC Television Service.

=== December ===
- 31 December – The BBC ends the day's television broadcasting with Seeing the New Year In.

== Debuts ==
- 5 May – Rory The Tiger and Friend (1939–1965, 1974–1981)
- 7 June – The Dark Lady of the Sonnets (1946)
- 12 June – Cookery (1946–1951)
- 2 July – Jeannie (1946)
- 7 July – Frieda (1946)
- 21 July – The Shop at Sly Corner (1946)
- 4 August – Muffin the Mule (1946–1955, 2005–2006)
- 9 August – The Playboy of the Western World (1946)
- 20 August – The Man with the Cloak Full of Holes (1946)
- 27 August – The Rose and Crown (1946)
- 22 November – Kaleidoscope (1946–1953)
- 29 November – Pinwright's Progress (1946–1947)
- 1 December – Morning Departure (1946)
- 21 December – Alice (1946)
- 29 December – Toad of Toad Hall (1946)

== Television shows returning after the war ==
=== 1920s ===
- BBC Wimbledon (1927–1939, 1946–2019, 2021–present)

=== 1930s ===
- Picture Page (1936–1939, 1946–1952)
- Starlight (1936–1939, 1946–1949)
- For the Children (1937–1939, 1946–1952)
- Trooping the Colour (1937–1939, 1946–2019, 2023–present)
- Telecrime (1938–1939, 1946)
- The Boat Race (1938–1939, 1946–2019)
- BBC Cricket (1939, 1946–1999, 2020–2024)

== Ending this year ==
- Telecrime (1938–1939, 1946)

== Births ==
- 1 February – Elisabeth Sladen, English actress (Doctor Who) (died 2011)
- 5 February – Charlotte Rampling, English actress
- 7 February – Pete Postlethwaite, English character actor (died 2011)
- 16 February – Ian Lavender, actor (Dad's Army) (died 2024)
- 18 February – Michael Buerk, journalist and news presenter
- 20 February – Brenda Blethyn, English actress
- 21 February – Alan Rickman, English actor (died 2016)
- 21 March – Timothy Dalton, Welsh actor
- 28 March – Tricia Ingrams, journalist and television presenter (died 1996)
- 5 April – Jane Asher, actress
- 11 April – Bob Harris, radio and television presenter
- 13 April – Christopher Strauli, actor
- 18 April – Hayley Mills, actress
- 19 April – Tim Curry, English actor, vocalist and composer (died 2026)
- May – Jock Brown, football commentator
- 1 May – Joanna Lumley, actress
- 10 May – Maureen Lipman, actress, columnist and comedian
- 13 May – Tim Pigott-Smith, actor (died 2017)
- 3 June – Penelope Wilton, actress
- 15 June – Noddy Holder, English rock singer-songwriter (Slade) and actor
- 5 July – Gwyneth Powell, English actress (died 2022)
- 14 July – Sue Lawley, broadcaster
- 17 July
  - Alun Armstrong, actor
  - Jeffrey Holland, actor
- 26 August – Alison Steadman, actress
- 11 September – Julie Covington, singer and actress
- 19 September – Michael Elphick, actor (died 2002)
- 25 September – Felicity Kendal, actress
- 28 September – Helen Shapiro, pop singer and actress
- 29 September – Patricia Hodge, English actress
- 10 October
  - Charles Dance, actor (The Jewel in the Crown)
  - Chris Tarrant, broadcaster and television presenter
- 11 October – Bob Warman, presenter (ATV Today, Good Morning Calendar)
- 14 October – Katy Manning, English actress
- 17 October – Vicki Hodge, English actress
- 22 October – Kelvin MacKenzie, media executive
- 31 October – Stephen Rea, Northern Irish actor
- 18 November – Andrea Allan, Scottish actress
- 20 December – Lesley Judd, English actress and television presenter
- 23 December – John Sullivan, English scriptwriter (died 2011)
- 27 December – Janet Street-Porter, English journalist, broadcast presenter and television executive

== Deaths ==
- 14 June – John Logie Baird, 57, engineer and inventor of the world's first working television system.

== See also ==
- 1946 in British music
- 1946 in the United Kingdom
- List of British films of 1946
