= Joseph Solomon =

Joseph Solomon may refer to:

- Joseph Solomon (murderer) (died 1995), convicted murderer executed by Saint Lucia
- Joseph J. Solomon Jr. (born 1984), American politician in the Rhode Island House of Representatives
- Joseph Michael Solomon (1886–1920), South African architect
- Joe Solomon (1930–2023), West Indian cricketer
