= The Happy Wanderer =

German popular song

Original recording by the Obernkirchen Children's Choir

"The Happy Wanderer" ("Der fröhliche Wanderer" or "Mein Vater war ein Wandersmann") is a popular song. The original text was written by Florenz Friedrich Sigismund (1791–1877).

The present tune was composed by Friedrich-Wilhelm Möller shortly after World War II. The work is often mistaken for a German folk song, but it is an original composition. Möller's sister Edith conducted a small amateur children's and youth choir in the district of Schaumburg, Lower Saxony, Germany, internationally named Obernkirchen Children's Choir, in Germany named Schaumburger Märchensänger. She adapted Sigismund's words for her choir.

In 1953, a BBC radio broadcast of the choir's winning performance at the Llangollen International Musical Eisteddfod turned the song into an instant hit. On 22 January 1954 the song entered the UK singles chart and stayed on the chart—only a Top 12 at the time—for 26 non-consecutive weeks, peaking at Number 2 (for five consecutive weeks). Another version by the British vocal ensemble The Stargazers reached number 12 in April of 1954.

The amateur choir, many of whose original members were war orphans, turned into an international phenomenon in the following years. The group performed on many international tours under the name Obernkirchen Children's Choir and recorded several albums. They made two appearances on The Ed Sullivan Show (29 November 1964 and 11 December 1966).

Die Isarspatzen, Herbert Beckh und das Tanzorchester des Bayerischen Rundfunks Munich have recorded a German version of the song "Der fröhliche Wanderer". Electrola released that recording in 1955 as catalog number EG 8082.

The song's German lyrics have been translated into several languages, and it has since become a choir classic. The first adaptation into another language was done by a Belgian woman, Andrée Mazy, who translated it into Dutch-Flemish and French. Since in Dutch folk songs "valderi-valdera" (pronounced "falderi-faldera") is more common than the German "falleri-fallera", she used the Dutch model in both versions. When Antonia Ridge was writing the English lyrics, she became acquainted with the French version of the song, with "valderi-valdera", pronounced with a true soft /v/ instead of the voiceless /f/, and used it in the English version mainly for euphonic reasons (less military sounding). During WWII, a more military version of the song became immensely popular with the German paratroopers. Although Friedrich-Wilhelm Möller reportedly composed "Mein Vater war ein Wandersmann" shortly after World War II, Steven Spielberg's 1993 historical drama film, Schindler's List, set during the war, contains a scene in which a group is singing the tune, mixed with another German (folk) song, in a nightclub during that war.

Milton Delugg wrote an arrangement and is sometimes incorrectly credited as the composer of the song. A number of English-language sources credit Edith Möller and Florenz Siegesmund with writing the words, the implication being (apparently) that they were written at the same time as the tune. However, the German sources all credit the original words to either Friedrich Sigismund, F. Sigismund, or Florenz Friedrich Sigismund and give the dates as either 1788–1857 or early 19th century. All German sources agree that the words to the popular version were adapted by Edith Möller.

The song also became the unofficial anthem of Major League Baseball's Montreal Expos (since relocated to become the Washington Nationals).

"The Happy Wanderer" was selected as the winner of Trinidad's 1955 Road March title, awarded to the song which was most played by steelbands during that year's Trinidad and Tobago Carnival season. It was the only time a non-calypso song had been awarded this honour. It was also the marching-out song of the Royal Hong Kong Police Force, and its successor, Hong Kong Police Force since the 1970s, except a brief replacement by "捍衛香港 (Defend Hong Kong)" from 2021 to 2024. The Malaysian girl-group Four Golden Princess have sung it as "Joyfully moving forward" (快樂的向前走).

== Melody ==
Source
