= 1940 in British music =

This is a summary of 1940 in music in the United Kingdom.

== Events ==
- 30 January – Sophie Wyss gives the first complete performance of Benjamin Britten's Les Illuminations, with Boyd Neel conducting his Orchestra at the Wigmore Hall, London.
- 28 March – Antonio Brosa gives the first performance of Britten's Violin Concerto with the New York Philharmonic Orchestra conducted by John Barbirolli in Carnegie Hall, New York.
- 21 April – Michael Tippett's Concerto for Double String Orchestra is given its first performance in London.
- May – Ilona Kabos and Louis Kentner record William Walton's Duets for Children for Columbia.
- 22 June – John Ireland is evacuated from Guernsey just over a week before the island is invaded by Germany.
- date unknown – D'Oyly Carte bass L. Radley Flynn marries contralto Ella Halman.

== Popular music ==
- "All Over The Place" w. Frank Eyton m. Noel Gay. Introduced by Tommy Trinder in the film Sailors Three.
- "Let The People Sing" w.m. Noel Gay, Ian Grant & Frank Eyton

== Classical music: new works ==
- Granville Bantock – Celtic Symphony
- Lennox Berkeley – Symphony No. 1
- Benjamin Britten – Sinfonia da Requiem
- William Walton – The Wise Virgins (ballet)

== Film and Incidental music ==
- Richard Addinsell – Gaslight, starring Anton Walbrook and Diana Wynyard.
- Bretton Byrd – A Window in London, starring Michael Redgrave.
- Ernest Irving – Sailors Three
- Louis Levy – Night Train to Munich directed by Carol Reed, starring Margaret Lockwood and Rex Harrison.

== Musical theatre ==
- 5 March – The Beggar's Opera (Music and Lyrics: John Gay adapted by Frederic Austin). London revival, directed by John Gielgud, opened at the Haymarket Theatre.
- 20 March – White Horse Inn (Music: Ralph Benatzky Lyrics and Book: Harry Graham). London revival opened at the London Coliseum and ran for 268 performances until ended by bombing raids.
- 11 April – New Faces London revue opened at the Comedy Theatre, then moved to the Apollo Theatre on 14 March 1941.
- 27 August – Apple Sauce (Music and Lyrics: Michael Carr & Jack Strachey). London production opened at the Holborn Empire, then moved to the London Palladium on 5 March 1941, after the Holborn Empire was destroyed in the Blitz. Total run 462 performances.

== Musical films ==
- Laugh It Off, starring Tommy Trinder, Jean Colin, Anthony Hulme and Marjorie Browne.

== Births ==
- 11 January – Sydney Devine, Scottish singer (died 2021)
- 18 January – Lindsay L. Cooper, Scottish jazz string player (died 2001)
- 15 May – Lena Martell, born Helen Thomson, Scottish singer (died 2026)
- 7 June – Tom Jones, born Thomas John Woodward, Welsh singer
- 8 June - Stanley Robertson, Scottish folk and ballad singer and piper (died 2009)
- 23 June
  - Adam Faith, born Terence Nelhams Wright, singer, screen actor and financial journalist (died 2003)
  - Stuart Sutcliffe, Scottish-born rock guitarist (The Beatles) and abstract painter (died 1962 in Hamburg)
- 4 July – Dave Rowberry, pianist and songwriter (The Animals) (died 2003)
- 7 July – Ringo Starr, born Richard Starkey, rock drummer (The Beatles)
- 10 July – Brian Priestley, pianist and composer (National Youth Jazz Orchestra)
- 19 August – Roger Cook, songwriter ("I'd Like to Teach the World to Sing (In Perfect Harmony)")
- 9 October – John Lennon, rock singer-songwriter (The Beatles) (killed 1980 in New York)
- 14 October – Cliff Richard, born Harry Webb in British India, singer
- 23 October – Tom McGrath, Scottish jazz pianist and playwright (died 2009)
- 15 November – Hank Wangford, born Sam Hutt, country and western singer-songwriter, guitarist and physician
- 25 December – Pete Brown, performance poet and lyricist (died 2023)

== Deaths ==
- 31 March – Achille Rivarde, American-born violinist and teacher, 74
- 10 July – Sir Donald Tovey, musicologist and composer, 64
- 16 December – William Wallace, composer, 80

== See also ==
- 1940 in British television
- 1940 in the United Kingdom
- List of British films of 1940
