= 1946 in the United Kingdom =

Events from the year 1946 in the United Kingdom.

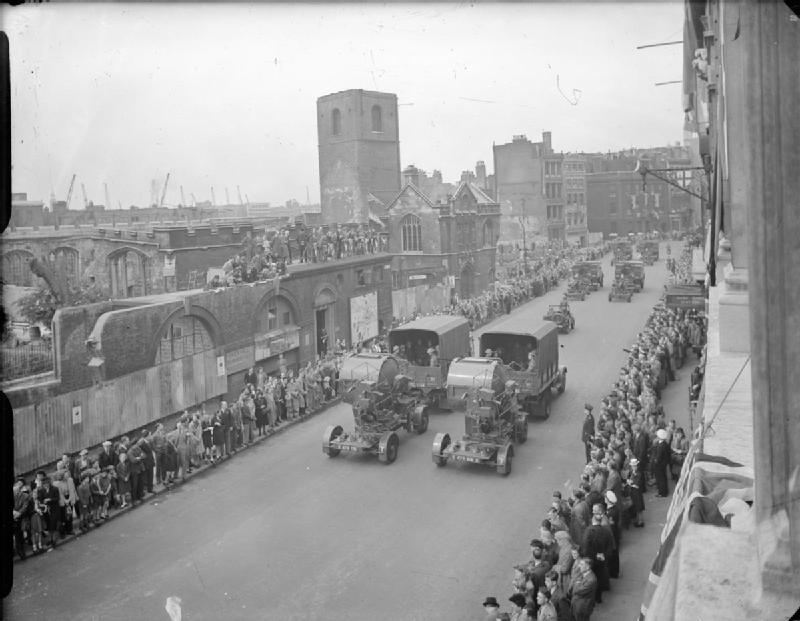
Searchlights at London Victory Parade, June 1946

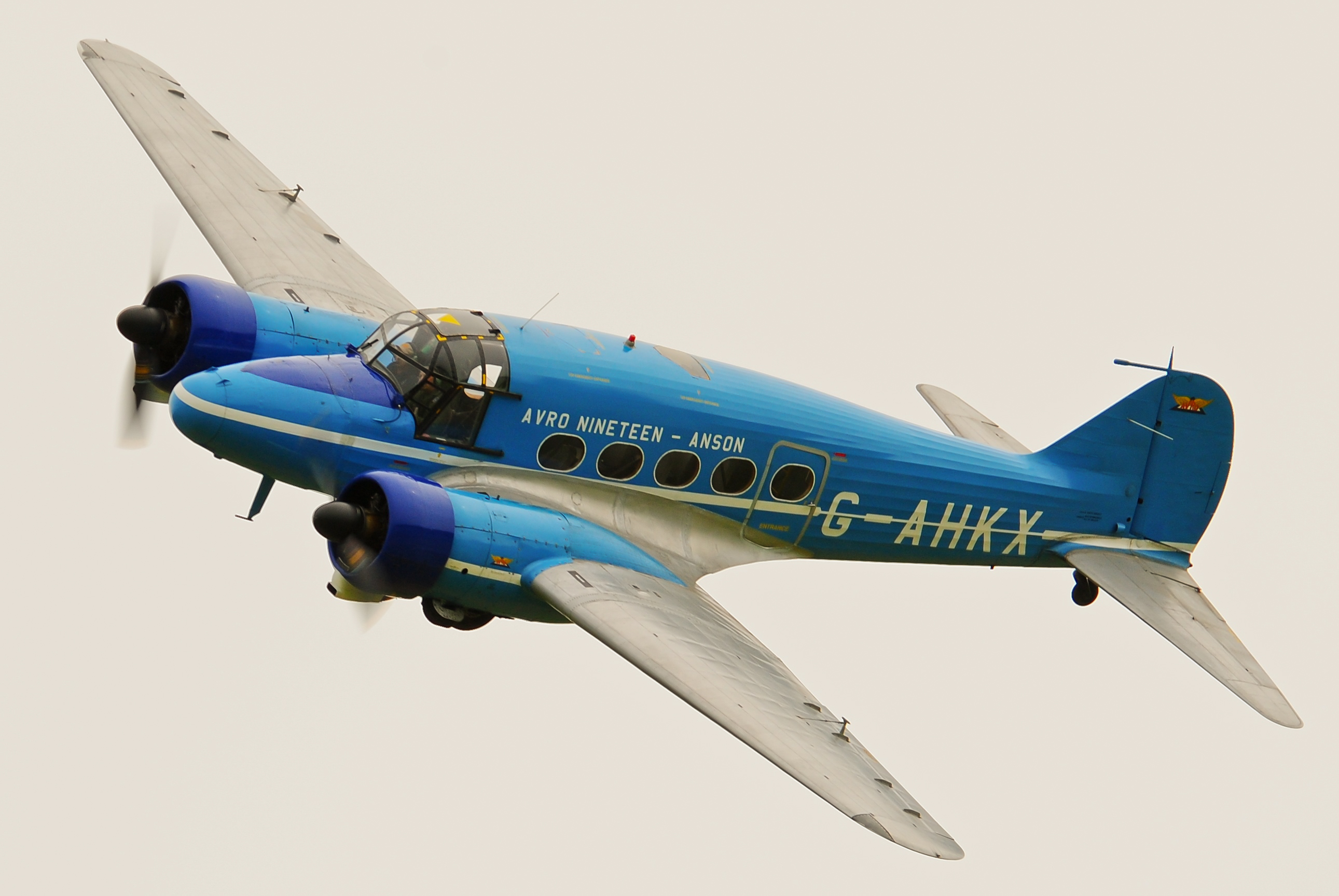
1946 Avro Anson, now in the Shuttleworth Collection, 2013 photo.

== Incumbents ==
- Monarch – George VI
- Prime Minister – Clement Attlee (Labour)

== Events ==
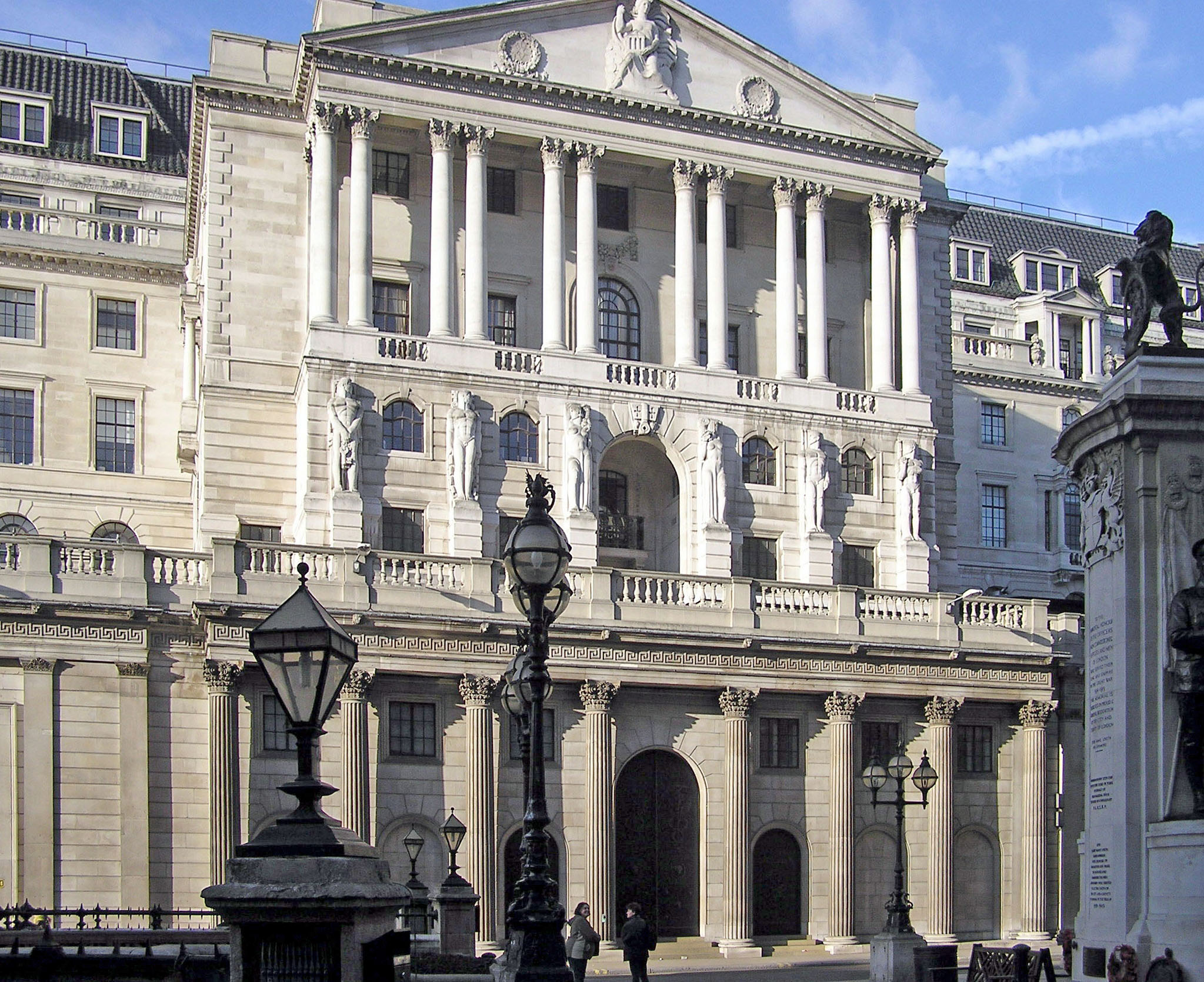
The Bank of England's head office at Threadneedle Street, in the City of London.

=== Undated ===
- Cinemagoing reaches an all-time peak, with 1,635 million admissions during the year.
- Lifting the prohibition on married women working in the Civil Service.
- Fred Pontin opens the first Pontins holiday camp, at Brean Sands, Burnham-on-Sea in Somerset.
- The University of Bristol establishes the first university drama department in the UK.
- Bush DAC90 bakelite radio introduced: it becomes the best-selling model for some years.

=== January & February ===
- 1 January
  - The first international flight from London Heathrow Airport, to Buenos Aires.
  - Atomic Energy Research Establishment established at Harwell, near Oxford.
- 4 January – Theodore Schurch is hanged at HM Prison Pentonville by Albert Pierrepoint, the only British soldier executed for treachery committed during World War II and the last person to be executed in Britain for an offence other than murder.
- 10 January – First United Nations General Assembly convenes at Methodist Central Hall Westminster.
- 17 January – The United Nations Security Council holds its first meeting at Church House in London.
- 14 February – The Bank of England is nationalised.
- 15 February – American dance craze, the Jitterbug, sweeps Britain.
- 20 February – Royal Opera House in Covent Garden re-opens after the War with The Royal Ballet (relocated from Sadler's Wells Theatre) performing The Sleeping Beauty.

=== March & April ===
- 5 March – Winston Churchill delivers his "Iron Curtain" speech at Westminster College in Fulton, Missouri, United States.
- 9 March – Burnden Park disaster: A stadium disaster at Bolton Wanderers F.C.'s Burnden Park in Bolton kills 33 and injures hundreds.
- 10 March – British troops begin withdrawal from Lebanon.
- 15 March – Labour Prime Minister Clement Attlee announces that Britain is granting India's wish for independence. On 24 March, the 1946 Cabinet Mission to India arrives in New Delhi for discussions.
- 22 March – The Treaty of London grants the British mandate of the Emirate of Transjordan its independence.
- 24 March – BBC Home Service radio broadcasts Alistair Cooke's first American Letter. As Letter from America, the programme would continue until a few weeks before Cooke's death in 2004.
- 27 April – 1946 FA Cup Final: the first postwar FA Cup final is won by Derby County, who beat Charlton Athletic 4–1 at Wembley Stadium.

=== May & June ===
- 4 May – First-class cricket returns, having been suspended during the War.
- 20 May – The House of Commons votes through the Coal Industry Nationalisation Act 1946 to nationalise British coal mines.
- 23 May – Terence Rattigan's drama The Winslow Boy premieres in London.
- 31 May – London Heathrow Airport opened fully for civilian use.
- 1 June – Television licence introduced.
- 7 June – Television broadcasting by the BBC, suspended during World War II, resumes.
- 8 June – A victory parade is held in London to celebrate the end of World War II. A certificate is issued to all schoolchildren.
- 27 June – Government imposes bread rationing.

=== July & August ===
- July – Homeless families squat in a former Army camp at Scunthorpe.
- August – Arthur Horner, a member of the Communist Party, becomes General Secretary of the National Union of Mineworkers.
- 1 August
  - Finance Act receives Royal Assent, including the establishment of the National Land Fund to secure culturally significant property for the nation as a memorial to the dead of World War II.
  - Atomic Energy Act of 1946 in the United States ends co-operation between the U.K. and U.S. on development of nuclear technology.
- 6 August
  - Family allowance introduced, a cash benefit paid to mothers, under terms of the Family Allowances Act 1945 (passed under the Churchill caretaker ministry).
  - Free milk (1/3 pint daily) provided in UK state schools to all pupils under the age of 18.
- 9 August – Arts Council incorporated by royal charter.
- 31 August – League football returns, having been suspended during World War II.

=== September & October ===
- September–November – Britain Can Make It exhibition at the Victoria and Albert Museum in London, promoted by the Council of Industrial Design and the Board of Trade to show off good domestic and industrial design.
- 8 September – Mass squat by homeless families at the Ivanhoe Hotel and other empty properties in London organised by the Communist Party.
- 15 September – Marshal of the Royal Air Force Sir Arthur Harris, Commander-in-Chief of RAF Bomber Command, retires.
- 16 September – Popular quiz show Have A Go! with Wilfred Pickles is first broadcast nationally on BBC Radio.
- 29 September – BBC Third Programme begins broadcasting.
- 1 October – English premiere of J. B. Priestley's drama An Inspector Calls at the New Theatre, London, starring Ralph Richardson.
- 7 October – The BBC Light Programme transmits the first episode of the daily radio magazine programme Woman's Hour (initially presented by Alan Ivimey) which will still be running 80 years later and of the daily adventure serial Dick Barton – Special Agent.
- 10 October – First community arts centre opened, at Bridgwater in Somerset.

=== November & December ===
- 1 November – First Royal Command Performance at a public cinema, the Empire, Leicester Square: premiere of the Powell and Pressburger film A Matter of Life and Death starring David Niven.
- 9 November – Shooting of Margaret Cook in Carnaby Street, London.
- 10 November – Peter Scott opens the Slimbridge Wetland Reserve in Gloucestershire.
- 11 November – Stevenage, a village in Hertfordshire, is designated by the Attlee government as Britain's first new town to relieve overcrowding and replace bombed homes in London. The new town is set to have around 60,000 residents once it is completed and the first homes are expected to be ready by 1952 and the town fully developed by the early 1960s. The town's centerpiece will be a revolutionary pedestrianised central shopping area.
- 17 November – Eight British Army servicemen are killed in Jerusalem by Jewish terrorists.
- 22 November – Tony Benn is elected as Treasurer of the Oxford Union.
- 29 November
  - Premiere of educational documentary film The Instruments of the Orchestra containing Benjamin Britten's composition The Young Person's Guide to the Orchestra (concert premiere 15 October conducted by Malcolm Sargent with the Royal Liverpool Philharmonic in the Philharmonic Hall, Liverpool).
  - BBC Television begins airing Pinwright's Progress, the world's first regular half-hour situation comedy.
- 26 December – David Lean's film of Great Expectations, based on the Charles Dickens novel, and featuring John Mills, Valerie Hobson, Martita Hunt, Alec Guinness, Francis L. Sullivan, Jean Simmons, and Finlay Currie, is released to great acclaim.

== Publications ==
- January – launch of Penguin Classics under the editorship of E. V. Rieu, whose translation of the Odyssey is the first published in the series and will be the country's best-selling book over the next decade.
- W. V. Awdry's children's book Thomas the Tank Engine, first in The Railway Series.
- Enid Blyton's girl school story First Term at Malory Towers, first in the Malory Towers series.
- Agatha Christie's Hercule Poirot novel The Hollow.
- R. G. Collingwood's collected philosophical lectures The Idea of History (posthumous).
- John Stewart Collis' memoir While Following the Plough.
- Stella Gibbons' novel Westwood.
- Philip Larkin's novel Jill.
- George Mikes' book How to be an Alien.
- Mervyn Peake's novel Titus Groan, first in the Gormenghast series.
- Thomas Sharp's book The Anatomy of the Village.
- Joint Committee of the Building Research Board and the Fire Offices' Committee's first report on fire safety General Principles and Structural Precautions.

== Births ==
=== January ===
- 3 January – John Paul Jones, bassist (Led Zeppelin)
- 6 January – Syd Barrett, guitarist and singer (Pink Floyd) (died 2006)
- 7 January – Mike Wilds, racing driver and pilot
- 14 January – Harold Shipman, serial killer (died 2004)
- 19 January – Julian Barnes, novelist
- 25 January – Pete Price, Merseyside radio disc jockey
- 26 January – Timothy Clifford, art historian
- 28 January – David Duckham, rugby union player (died 2023)
- 30 January – John Bird, Baron Bird, social entrepreneur and life peer

=== February ===
- 1 February – Elisabeth Sladen, television actress (died 2011)
- 5 February – Charlotte Rampling, actress
- 7 February
  - Brian Patten, Liverpool poet
  - Pete Postlethwaite, actor (died 2011)
- 9 February – Seán Neeson, Alliance Party of Northern Ireland politician
- 11 February – Malcolm Walker, English businessman
- 13 February – Colin Matthews, composer
- 15 February – Clare Short, politician
- 16 February – Ian Lavender, actor (died 2024)
- 20 February – Brenda Blethyn, actress
- 21 February – Alan Rickman, actor (died 2016)
- 26 February – Colin Bell, footballer (died 2021)
- 28 February – Robin Cook, Labour politician (died 2005)

=== March ===
- 1 March – Tony Ashton, rock pianist and music producer (died 2001)
- 4 March
  - Michael Ashcroft, entrepreneur
  - Harvey Goldsmith, performing arts promoter
  - John Virgo, snooker player and commentator (died 2026)
- 5 March – Murray Head, actor and singer
- 6 March
  - David Gilmour, singer and guitarist (Pink Floyd)
  - Richard Noble, entrepreneur and land speed record holder
- 7 March – Matthew Fisher, singer-songwriter and producer
- 15 March – David Wall, ballet dancer (died 2013)
- 19 March – Steve Halliwell, actor (died 2023)
- 21 March – Timothy Dalton, actor
- 22 March – Richard Faulkner, Baron Faulkner of Worcester, journalist and politician
- 23 March – Alan Bleasdale, screenwriter
- 25 March – Cliff Balsam, footballer
- 27 March – Patrick Richardson, travel writer and author

=== April ===
- 2 April
  - Raymond Gubbay, English impresario
  - Sue Townsend, novelist and playwright (died 2014)
- 4 April – Dave Hill, guitarist (Slade)
- 5 April – Jane Asher, actress and author
- 9 April
  - Les Gray, vocalist (Mud) (died 2004)
  - Alan Knott, cricketer
  - Sara Parkin, Scottish activist and politician
- 11 April – Bob Harris, radio disc jockey
- 12 April – George Robertson, Scottish politician
- 15 April – Hugh Laddie, judge (died 2008)
- 17 April – Clare Francis, sailor and writer
- 19 April – Tim Curry, actor, voice artist, singer and composer (died 2026)
- 24 April – Piers Gough, architect
- 25 April – John Fox, statistician
- 27 April – Nicholas Serota, art curator
- 28 April – Linda Knowles, high jumper
- 29 April – Humphrey Carpenter, children's writer and broadcaster (died 2005)

=== May ===
- 1 May – Joanna Lumley, actress
- 2 May – David Suchet, actor
- 4 May – John Watson, Northern Irish racing driver
- 7 May – Michael Rosen, writer and poet
- 8 May – Ruth Padel, poet and writer
- 10 May
  - Donovan, Scottish musician
  - Maureen Lipman, actress, columnist and comedian
  - Dave Mason, rock singer-songwriter and guitarist (Traffic)
- 11 May – David Varney, civil servant
- 13 May – Tim Pigott-Smith, actor (died 2017)
- 16 May – Robert Fripp, rock guitarist
- 19 May – Trevor Adams, actor (died 2000)
- 20 May – Paul Hirst, sociologist (died 2003)
- 22 May – George Best, Northern Irish footballer (died 2005)
- 23 May – Stephen Marks, English businessman
- 27 May – Lewis Collins, actor (died 2013)

=== June ===
- 1 June – Brian Cox, Scottish actor
- 2 June – Peter Sutcliffe, serial killer (died 2020)
- 3 June – Penelope Wilton, actress
- 11 June – Jenny Pitman, horse trainer and author
- 14 June – Ernie Graham, Northern Irish singer-songwriter (died 2001)
- 15 June – Noddy Holder, rock singer-songwriter (Slade)
- 19 June – Michael Jay, Baron Jay of Ewelme, English politician and diplomat, British Ambassador to France
- 20 June – Nigel Kalton, mathematician and academic (died 2010)
- 21 June –
  - Kate Hoey, politician
  - Maurice Saatchi, Baron Saatchi, businessman
- 22 June – Sheila Hollins, Baroness Hollins, psychiatrist
- 23 June – Kathy Wilkes, philosopher (died 2003)
- 25 June
  - Buzz Goodbody, English theatre director (died 1975)
  - Ian McDonald, musician (died 2022)
- 26 June – Clive Francis, actor and caricaturist
- 28 June – Jamie Cann, politician (died 2001)

=== July ===
- 1 July – Mick Aston, archaeologist (died 2013)
- 5 July
  - Gwyneth Powell, actress (died 2022)
  - Paul Smith, fashion designer
- 9 July
  - Mike Hancock, politician
  - Mitch Mitchell, drummer (died 2008)
- 12 July – Robert Fisk, writer and journalist (died 2020)
- 14 July – Sue Lawley, broadcaster
- 30 July – Dixie Deans, footballer (died 2025)

=== August ===
- 3 August – Jack Straw, politician
- 6 August
  - Ron Davies, politician
  - Allan Holdsworth, guitarist and composer (died 2017)
- 15 August
  - Tony Robinson, actor and broadcaster
  - William Waldegrave, Baron Waldegrave of North Hill, academic and politician, Chancellor of the Duchy of Lancaster
- 23 August
  - Keith Moon, rock drummer (The Who) (died 1978)
  - Willy Russell, playwright
- 26 August – Alison Steadman, actress
- 27 August – Peter Tobin, serial killer (died 2022)

=== September ===
- 1 September – Barry Gibb, Manx-born pop singer-songwriter
- 5 September – Freddie Mercury (born Farrokh Bulsara in Zanzibar), rock singer (Queen) (died 1991)
- 9 September – Adrian Smith, statistician, President of the Royal Society
- 10 September – Don Powell, drummer (Slade)
- 11 September
  - Mike Bull, Northern Irish pole vaulter and decathlete
  - Anthony Browne, author and illustrator
  - John Roberts, Welsh footballer and manager (died 2016)
  - Jim Shoulder, footballer and manager
- 12 September – Neil Lyndon, journalist and author
- 17 September – Billy Bonds, footballer (died 2025)
- 19 September
  - Michael Elphick, actor (died 2002)
  - Oliver Foot, actor (died 2008)
- 22 September – John Tomlinson, operatic bass
- 25 September – Felicity Kendal, actress
- 28 September – Tom Bower, writer and journalist
- 29 September – Patricia Hodge, actress

=== October ===
- 8 October – Bel Mooney, author, journalist, advice columnist
- 10 October
  - Charles Dance, actor
  - Raymond Tallis, writer and poet
  - Chris Tarrant, television and radio presenter
- 12 October – Chris Nicholl, football player and manager (died 2024)
- 13 October – Edwina Currie, Conservative politician, author and radio personality
- 14 October
  - Justin Hayward, singer and songwriter (Moody Blues)
  - Peter Jonas, opera director
  - Katy Manning, English-Australian actress and production manager
- 17 October
  - Cameron Mackintosh, theatre producer
  - Vicki Hodge, actress
- 18 October – Dafydd Elis-Thomas, Welsh politician (died 2025)
- 19 October – Philip Pullman, author
- 22 October
  - Eileen Gordon, Labour politician
  - Kelvin MacKenzie, media executive and newspaper editor
- 29 October – Peter Green, blues rock guitarist and singer-songwriter (died 2020)
- 31 October – Stephen Rea, Northern Irish actor

=== November ===
- 1 November – Ric Grech, bassist (Family, Blind Faith, Traffic (died 1990)
- 5 November
  - Caroline Jackson, politician
  - Ken Whaley, Austrian-English bass player and songwriter (died 2013)
- 6 November – Susie Orbach, psychotherapist
- 7 November – Martin Barre, musician (Jethro Tull)
- 12 November – P. P. Arnold, born Patricia Ann Cole, American-born soul singer
- 14 November – Carola Dunn, English writer
- 18 November
  - Andrea Allan, Scottish actress
  - Chris Rainbow, Scottish singer-songwriter and producer (died 2015)
- 21 November – Marina Warner, writer
- 22 November – Brian Cookman, musician and composer (died 2005)
- 23 November – Diana Quick, actress

=== December ===
- 4 December – Angela Browning, Conservative politician and MP for Tiverton and Honiton
- 12 December – Barrie Rutter, actor and director
- 14 December
  - Antony Beevor, military historian
  - Jane Birkin, English-born actress and singer (died 2023)
  - Peter Lorimer, Scottish footballer (died 2021)
- 16 December
  - Christopher Ellison, actor
  - Trevor Pinnock, harpsichordist and conductor
- 20 December – Lesley Judd, actress and television presenter
- 25 December – Christopher Frayling, cultural historian
- 27 December
  - Janet Street-Porter, broadcast journalist
  - Polly Toynbee, journalist and writer
- 29 December – Marianne Faithfull, English singer and actress (died 2025)
- 31 December – Roy Porter, medical historian (died 2002)
- date unknown
  - Alun Armstrong, actor
  - Graham Gouldman, guitarist and songwriter (10cc)
  - Howard Kendall, footballer and football manager
  - Christopher Strauli, comedy actor

== Deaths ==
- 2 January
  - Eleanor Rathbone, social campaigner and politician (born 1872)
  - Will Thorne, trade unionist and politician (born 1857)
- 3 January – William Joyce, Irish American fascist propagandist (born 1906) (hanged at Wandsworth Prison for treason)
- 4 January – Theodore Schurch, British-born soldier and collaborator (born 1918) (hanged at Pentonville Prison for treachery)
- 23 January – Sir Frank MacKinnon, judge (born 1871)
- 5 February – George Arliss, English film actor (born 1868)
- 8 March – Frederick W. Lanchester, automotive engineer (born 1868)
- 3 April – Alf Common, English footballer (born 1880)
- 21 April – John Maynard Keynes, economist (born 1883)
- 9 May – Connie Gilchrist, Countess of Orkney, child actress and model (born 1865)
- 25 May – Ernest Rhys, writer (born 1859)
- 26 May
  - Sir Francis Lacey, cricket administrator (born 1859)
  - Arthur Winnington-Ingram, Bishop of London (born 1858)
- 14 June – John Logie Baird, Scottish-born television pioneer (born 1888)
- 11 July – Paul Nash, artist (born 1889)
- 15 July – Razor Smith, English cricketer (born 1877)
- 23 July – James Maxton, Scottish socialist, leader of the Independent Labour Party (born 1885)
- 13 August – H. G. Wells, English novelist (born 1866)
- 16 August – Sir Granville Bantock, classical composer and conductor (born 1868)
- 31 August – Harley Granville-Barker, actor, playwright and critic (born 1877)
- 16 September – Sir James Jeans, physicist, astronomer and mathematician (born 1877)
- 2 November – John Barrett, Roman Catholic bishop (born 1878)
- 17 November – Helen Lavinia Cochrane, artist (born 1868)
- 18 November – Donald Meek, actor (born 1878)
- 17 December – Constance Garnett, translator (born 1861)

== See also ==
- List of British films of 1946
- The Winter of 1946–47 in the U.K.
