= Antonia Ridge =

Dutch writer and broadcaster

Antonia Florence Ridge (7 October 1895 – 18 June 1981) was a Dutch-born writer and broadcaster, who wrote the English lyrics for Friedrich-Wilhelm Möller's popular song, "The Happy Wanderer" (originally "Der fröhliche Wanderer" or "Mein Vater war ein Wandersmann"), and others of his works.

She wrote fiction and non-fiction, for adults and children. She scripted and read plays for BBC Radio's Children's Hour. Her non-fiction works include a biography of the botanical artist, Pierre-Joseph Redouté, and For Love of a Rose, a biography of the rose-growing Meilland family. Some of her works were collaborations with the Dutch author Mies Bouhuys.

She appeared as a castaway on the BBC Radio programme Desert Island Discs on 25 January 1960.

== Bibliography ==
- —— (1946). The Handy Elephant.
- —— (1953). Family Album. Faber and Faber.
- —— (1956). Cousin Jan. Faber and Faber.
- —— (1963). Rom Bom Bom.
- —— (1965). For Love of a Rose. Faber and Faber.
- —— (1970). How Jan Klaassen Cured the King: A Play for Children. Faber and Faber. ISBN 978-0571093595.
- —— (1974). The Man Who Painted Roses: Story of Pierre-Joseph Redoute. Faber and Faber. ISBN 978-0571105540.

=== With Mies Bouhuys ===
- ——; —— (1960). The Little Red Pony. George G Harrap & Co.
- ——; ——. Hurrah for a Dutch Birthday.
- ——; ——. Melodia.
