= Condemned to Be Shot =

1939 BBC television drama

Condemned To Be Shot is an early BBC television drama, broadcast by the BBC Television Service in the United Kingdom on the evening of Saturday 4 March 1939. It is particularly notable for two reasons – firstly, it was one of the first plays to be written especially for television, rather than adapted from the theatre or from radio drama. Secondly, it was the first television production where the camera was made into one of the 'characters' of the piece – the play revolves around the first-person perspective of the character whose viewpoint the camera represents, and who is not otherwise seen, his voice heard only in voiceover. The play ends with the main character faced with a firing squad.

The cast consisted of Reginald Brooke, Zoe Davies, Olga Edwardes, Wilfred Fletcher, Neil Porter, Hilary Pritchard, Henry Belling and Ben Soutten.

Twenty minutes in length, the play was written by R.E.J. Brooke (presumably the actor Reginald Brooke, who also appeared in the production). It was produced by Jan Bussell and broadcast live from the BBC's studios at Alexandra Palace. As there was no professional method of recording television programmes at the time, no record survives of the production aside from still photographs.
