= Joseph Michael Solomon =

South African architect (b. 1886, d. 1920)

- Born: 11 December 1883
- Died: 26 August 1920 (aged 36)
- Education: Diocesan College Rondebosch, Cape Town
- Occupation: Architect

Joseph Michael Solomon (11 December 1883 – 26 August 1920) was a South African architect. He was educated at Bishops (Diocesan College) in Rondebosch, Cape Town.

He married Jean Elizabeth Emily Cox (née Hamilton), actress, in 1914. Their children were Olga and a younger son called Paul. He had a profound influence on his native country's cultural development and was recognized as its most talented interpreter during his short life.

Due to the immense pressure of being commissioned to design the University of Cape Town's buildings in Rondebosch and to restore the historic residence Vergelegen at the same time, he committed suicide in 1920 at the age of 36.
