= Patrick Richardson =

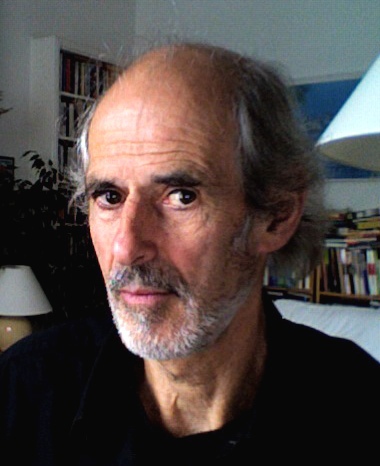
- Born: 17 March 1946; Sussex, England
- Occupation: Writer

Patrick Richardson (born 27 March 1946) is a writer who has been travelling to the most inaccessible parts of the world for fifty years and writing travel articles for the last twenty. He has written for The Guardian, The Daily Telegraph, The Sunday Telegraph, The Sunday Times, The Herald, The Sunday Herald, The Independent and The Scotsman.

He has also held several exhibitions of his travel photography, appeared on BBC Radio Four, BBC Radio Two and BBC Radio Scotland, and read at various prestigious literary festivals, including the Edinburgh International Book Festival in 2009 and 2014. Since then he has read at many other festivals and events, including The Royal Scottish Academy, The Royal Scottish Geographical Society and the National Library of Scotland. He continues to travel to distant parts of the world, exploring isolated traditional cultures. He published his first book, Reports From Beyond – A Journey through Life to remote Places, in 2008, which was The Herald’s Paperback of the Week and Wanderlust’s Book of the Month. In 2014 he followed this up with In Search of Landfall – The Odyssey of an Indefatigable Adventurer.

== Family background ==
Richardson was brought up as a Quaker. His grandfather, Henry Marriot Richardson, was a communist and a pacifist who was the first salaried general secretary of the National Union of Journalists from 1918 until 1936, and the president of the International Federation of Journalists from 1930 until 1932. As part of his work, he knew H. G. Wells, George Bernard Shaw and G. K. Chesterton, as well as the press barons Lord Beaverbrook, Lord Northcliffe and Lord Rothermere.

His father was also a journalist until, after 1945, the stigma of being a conscientious objector during the Second World War, when he had to work on a farm in Sussex, put paid to his career and he became the publicity director for a large agricultural company instead.

His mother was an intrepid traveller. In 1920, when she was only five, her father took her on a flight with Sir Alan Cobham, the long-distance aviation pioneer, in his open-air Tiger Moth biplane. In the mid-1930s, she spent six months travelling alone in Mussolini’s Italy. Later she travelled by herself to Russia, Poland and many Greek islands.

== Personal life ==
Richardson was born in Sussex, England. When he was five, the family moved to Edinburgh Scotland where, at primary School, he was taught by Norman McCaig, one of Scotland's most famous poets. He attended secondary school at George Watson’s College, Edinburgh He studied history and politics at Leeds and Edinburgh universities, where he shared a flat with Robin Cook, the future Foreign Secretary from 1997 to 2001 in Tony Blair’s Labour government. After graduation, he taught English in schools in the East End of London, and spent three years working on and off in Canada on tobacco and fruit harvests, and with the dynamite crew of an oil-pipeline.

In 1973, he moved to Amsterdam, where he lived for eleven years. While starting his writing career, he lived a bohemian life in a garret, supporting himself by washing dishes in the Kosmos, a large east–west cultural centre, and working in the bookshop of the Melkweg, the famous alternative arts centre. During this time he spent three years travelling in South America (where he met Jorge Luis Borges), South-east Asia and Central Africa.

In 1984 he returned to Edinburgh, where he joined the Campaign for Nuclear Disarmament, the Edinburgh Playwrights’ Workshop and the Scottish Writers’ Co-operative. He continues to live in Edinburgh, with Gabriella Moericke, a counsellor and psychotherapist from Göttingen in Germany, who has been his partner since 1992.

== Travelling career ==
Richardson’s first journey abroad was in 1965, when he worked as a volunteer on a kibbutz in Israel which was shelled by Syrian Army just before the Six-Day War. In 1967 he was one of the three drivers on the Edinburgh contingent to the Comex Overland Expedition to India, where he met Indira Gandhi, the Prime Minister. The following year he went on a student exchange to Charles University, Prague, where, during the so-called Prague Spring, he met Rudi Dutschke, Europe's most famous revolutionary student. Two months later, Soviet tanks invaded Czechoslovakia.

Following his passion for boat journeys, he has sailed up or down the Amazon, Congo, Irrawaddy, Niger, Nile and Yangtze Rivers, and crossed the Pacific from east to west. He has traversed the Andes, the Himalaya, the Hindu Kush, the Karakoram, the Pamir and the Tian Shan, and has travelled through the Atacama, the Negev, the Rub' al Khali, the Sahara and the Taklimakan.

During his travels he has developed an interest in remote indigenous peoples, such as the Bedouin of the Yemen; the Uyghurs of N.W. China; the Tadjiks of N.W. Pakistan; the Tibetans of Ladakh (India) and western Tibet; the Kazakhs of western Mongolia; and the islanders in the Trobriand Islands (Papua New Guinea), the Solomon Islands, Vanuatu, Western Samoa and Kiribati.

== Journeys ==
Europe: every country except Albania, Croatia and the Ukraine
Middle East: Israel and Egypt
West Asia: Turkey, Georgia, Iran and the Yemen
Central Asia: Afghanistan, Pakistan (the Karakoram Highway), Nepal Everest Base Camp, India, Kashmir and Ladakh
South-east Asia: Thailand, Malaysia and Burma
East Asia: southwest and northwest China (the Silk Road) and Japan
North America: the United States and Canada
Central America: Mexico, Guatemala and Cuba
South America: Peru, Bolivia, Argentina, Chile, Ecuador, Brazil and Colombia
West Africa: Mali
North Africa: Tunisia, Algeria and Morocco
Central Africa: Democratic Republic of Congo, Rwanda and Burundi
East Africa: Ethiopia, Kenya, Uganda, Tanzania and Zanzibar
Russia: the Trans-Siberian Railway and The Golden Ring
Pacific: French Polynesia, the Cook Islands, Tonga, Fiji, Vanuatu, the Solomon Islands, Papua New Guinea, Western Samoa, Kiribati and Easter Island (Chile)

== Books ==
His first book, REPORTS FROM BEYOND – A Journey through Life to remote Places, was published in 2008 by the Ultima Thule Press. In this book, he describes falling through the ice in Lake Baikal in Siberia, being attacked by a pack of dogs in Vanuatu in the Pacific, being trapped on top of a derailed train in the Congolese jungle, climbing sacred Mount Emei in western China, and sailing down the Niger River to Timbuktu in Mali.

His second book,IN SEARCH OF LANDFALL – The Odyssey of an Indefatigable Adventurer, was published in 2014, also by Ultima Thule Press. Using memoir as a vehicle, it is about one man’s search for answers to some of the most important questions we are all faced with: who are we, what are we doing here, and where are we going?

The book is loosely structured on Homer’s Odyssey.
