= The Laughing Lady =

1946 film

- Directed by: Paul L. Stein
- Written by: Ingram D'Abbes (play); Jack Whittingham
- Produced by: Louis H. Jackson
- Starring: Anne Ziegler; Webster Booth; Francis L. Sullivan
- Cinematography: Geoffrey Unsworth
- Edited by: Alan Osbiston
- Music by: Hans May
- Production company: British National Films
- Distributed by: Anglo-American Film Corporation
- Release date: 16 October 1946
- Running time: 100 minutes
- Country: United Kingdom
- Language: English

The Laughing Lady is a 1946 British Technicolor musical drama film directed by Paul L. Stein and starring Anne Ziegler, Webster Booth and Francis L. Sullivan. It was written by Jack Whittingham based on a play by Ingram D'Abbes. The plot follows a young aristocrat who makes a deal with Robespierre during the French Revolution.

== Plot summary ==
During the French Revolution, a young aristocrat makes a deal with Robespierre that he will locate and steal some pearls from Britain in order to save his mother from the guillotine.

== Cast ==
- Anne Ziegler as Denise Tremayne
- Webster Booth as Andre
- Francis L. Sullivan as Sir William Tremayne
- Peter Graves as Prince of Wales
- Chili Bouchier as Louise
- Felix Aylmer as Sir Felix Mountroyal
- Ralph Truman as Lord Mandeville
- Charles Goldner as Robespierre
- Jack Melford as Lord Barrymore
- Paul Dupuis as Poerre
- John Ruddock as Gilliatt
- George De Warfaz as Tinville
- Mary Martlew as Lady Langley
- Frederick Burtwell as Jenkins
- Hay Petrie as Tom

== Production ==
The film was one of several musicals from British National.

== Reception ==
The Monthly Film Bulletin wrote: "Anne Ziegler and Webster Booth are both thoroughly at home in the period costumes and settings, and from the point of view of the music at least no better choice could have been made for the leading roles. The film is full of tuneful romantic melodies and there is a strong supporting cast. Direction makes the most of the luxurious settings, which compare favourably with American productions of the same type."

Kine Weekly wrote: "Graceful, lavishly mounted Technicolor costume piece energetically accompanied by music and song. ... A generous eye and earful, it should prove a happy popular and family box office speculation."

Picturegoer wrote: "Conventional costume Technicolor musical, pleasingly presented with pleasant tunes, and story, which while it may be as old as the hills, has a certain nostalgic appeal. There are Webster Booth and Anne Ziegler singing and acting with verve. Peter Graves gives an outstanding performance as Prince of Wales."

Picture Show wrote: "Lavish, picturesque settings, charming Technicolor photography, delightfully tuneful music and agreeable acting and singing all go to make a pleasant little romance into enjoyable entertainment."
