= Telecrime =

- Also known as: Telecrimes
- Genre: Whodunit/Drama
- Country of origin: United Kingdom
- Original language: English
- No. of episodes: 17

Production
- Running time: ?x10 minutes 12x15 minutes ?x20 minutes

Original release
- Network: BBC Television Service
- Release: 10 August 1938 – 25 July 1939
- Release: 22 October – 28 November 1946

Telecrime is a British drama television series that aired on the BBC Television Service from 1938 to 1939 and in 1946. One of the first multi-episode drama series made, it is also one of the first television dramas written especially for television rather than being adapted from theatre or radio productions. Having first aired for five episodes from 1938 to 1939, Telecrime returned in 1946, following the resumption of television after the Second World War, and aired as Telecrimes.

Each episode of Telecrime featured a crime, and in a "whodunit" storyline, the viewers were given enough evidence to solve the crime themselves.. Most episodes were written by Mileson Horton. All seventeen episodes are lost. Aired live, their preservation would have been technically difficult at the time.

The producers for the 1946 series were Gordon Crier, Stephen Harrison and Douglas Muir.

== Episodes ==
The programme first aired, as Telecrime, for five episodes from 10 August 1938 to 25 July 1939 on the BBC Television Service. Each episode was ten or twenty minutes long. During the Second World War, the BBC suspended its television service. The channel resumed on 7 June 1946. From 22 October to 28 November that year, Telecrimes, as it was now titled, aired for a further twelve episodes. Each 1946 episode was fifteen minutes long. As was typical at the time, all the episodes were aired live and no recording was made, meaning none survives. The only visual record that survives of the programme is a single publicity photograph.

=== Telecrime (1938-39) ===
No.	Title	Written by	Original release date
1	"The Back-Stage Murder"	Mileson Horton and H.T. Hopkinson	10 August 1938
2	"Poetic Justice"	Arthur Phillips	24 October 1938
3	"The Fletcher Case"	Mileson Horton	24 February 1939
4	"The Almost Perfect Murder"	Mileson Horton	15 April 1939
5	"Circumstantial Evidence"	Mileson Horton	25 July 1939

=== Telecrimes (1946) ===
No.	Title	Written by	Original release date
6	"The Concert Hall Murder Case"	Mileson Horton	22 October 1946
7	"Death of a Golfer"	Mileson Horton	22 October 1946
8	"The Case of the Drunken Skipper"	Mileson Horton	5 November 1946
9	"Death of a Scientist"	Mileson Horton	5 November 1946
10	"Poison in Pimlico"	Mileson Horton	12 November 1946
11	"The Case of the Gentle Accomplice"	Mileson Horton	12 November 1946
12	"Death of a Playwright"	Mileson Horton	19 November 1946
13	"The Case of the Poisoned Port"	Mileson Horton	19 November 1946
14	"Who Killed Crask"	Mileson Horton	25 November 1946
15	"The Case of the Twin Sisters"	Mileson Horton	25 November 1946
16	"The Stolen Tiara"	Mileson Horton	28 November 1946
17	"Death of an Art"	Mileson Horton	28 November 1946
