= Cliff Balsom =

English footballer

Personal information
- Full name: Clifford Gene Balsom
- Date of birth: 25 March 1946 (age 80)
- Place of birth: Torquay, England
- Position: Full back

Youth career
- Torquay United

Senior career*
Years	Team	Apps	(Gls)
1964	Torquay United	4	(0)
1964–1965	Swindon Town	0	(0)
1965–196x	Torquay United	0	(0)
- Poole Town
1970–	Salisbury		
- * Club domestic league appearances and goals

Clifford Gene "Cliff" Balsom (born 25 March 1946) is an English former professional footballer who played in the Football League for Torquay United. He was born in Torquay, Devon.

A full back, he began his career as an apprentice with Torquay United, making his debut at the age of 17 on 25 January 1964 against York City at Bootham Crescent. In June 1964, he was transferred to Swindon Town after only four league games for the Gulls. He failed, however, to make the first team at Swindon, returned to Torquay United, but not to their first team, and left league football. He later played for Poole Town and Salisbury.
