= Webster Booth =

British tenor (1902–1984)

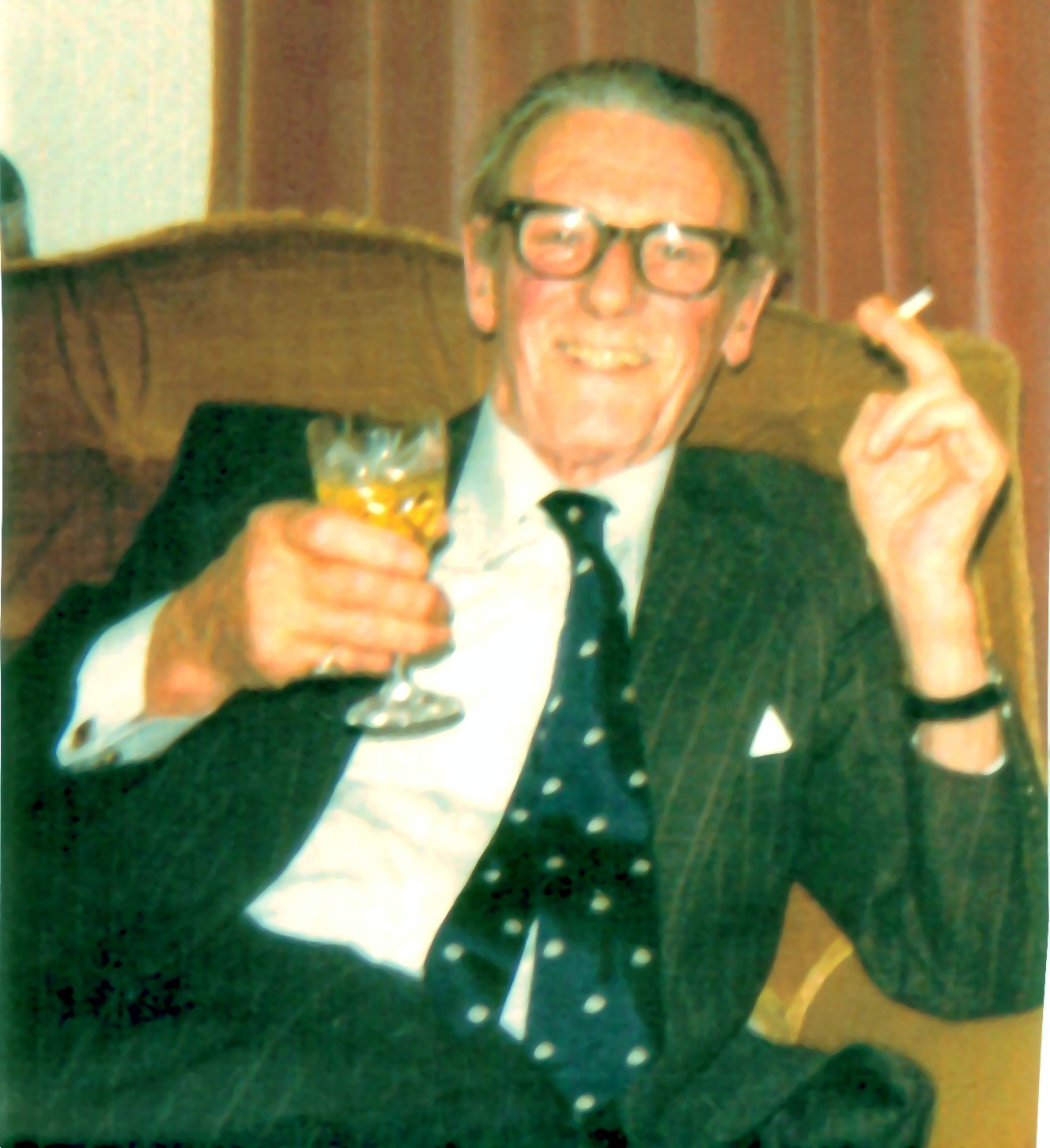
- Born: Leslie Webster Booth; 21 January 1902; Handsworth, West Midlands, England
- Died: 21 June 1984 (aged 82); Penrhyn Bay, Wales
- Known for: Oratorio, opera, musical comedy, ballads, duets
- Spouses: Winifred Keey (m. 1924; div. 1931) Dorothy Annie Alice 'Paddy' Prior (m. 1932; div. 1938) Irene Frances Eastwood 'Anne Ziegler' (m. 1938)
- Children: 1

Webster Booth (21 January 1902 – 21 June 1984) was an English tenor, best remembered as the duettist partner of Anne Ziegler. He was also one of the finest tenors of his generation and was a distinguished oratorio soloist.

He was a chorister at Lincoln Cathedral (1911–1915) and made his professional stage debut with the D'Oyly Carte Opera Company, where he performed from 1923 to 1927. He made his West End Debut in The Three Musketeers in 1930. He began recording for HMV in 1929 and made over 500 solo recordings and many duet recordings with Anne Ziegler. He and Ziegler embarked on their famous duettist variety act in 1940. They starred in three musical plays, "The Vagabond King" (1943), "Sweet Yesterday" (1945) and toured in "And so to Bed" (1953–1954) and appeared in several musical films in the 1940s. They made frequent broadcasts together. In 1948 they went on a successful concert tour of New Zealand and Australia.

When musical tastes changed in the 1950s they decided to emigrate to South Africa in 1956 where they continued their stage work as well as teaching singing in their Johannesburg studio. They returned to the United Kingdom in 1978 where they broadcast on BBC radio, appeared on television in the Russell Harty Show and made personal appearances throughout the United Kingdom in "An Evening with Anne Ziegler and Webster Booth". Booth died on 21 June 1984 at the age of 82.

== Early life ==
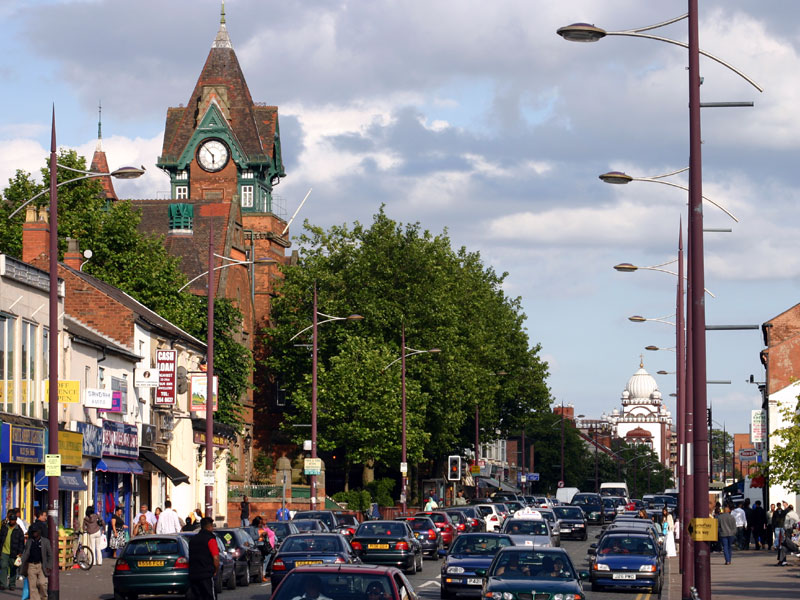
Soho Road in Handsworth, seen in 2007

Born Leslie Webster Booth at 157 Soho Road, Handsworth, Birmingham, on 21 January 1902, he was the youngest of the six children of hairdresser, Edwin Booth and his wife, Sarah (née Webster). Booth joined his two older brothers in the choir of St Mary's Church, Handsworth, the local parish church, and at the suggestion of the choir master, Arthur Guest-Smith, did a voice test at Lincoln Cathedral and joined the choir there at the age of nine, receiving a fine musical training under organist and choirmaster G. J. Bennett, and a free education at the choir school. His voice broke at the age of thirteen, so he returned home to do a commercial course at Aston Commercial, now known as Holte Grammar Commercial School, to fulfil his parents' wish that he should become an accountant.

Booth had been advised by Bennett not to sing for three years after his voice broke, so during that time he played goalie in the school football team and was considered good enough to be offered a place with Aston Villa Colts. He was tempted by this offer but eventually decided to pursue his dream of becoming a professional singer rather than a footballer. His headmaster at Aston Commercial School was Edgar Charles Keey, who would later become his father-in-law when he married Keey's daughter, Winifred, in 1924.

In his late teens he took singing lessons with Richard Wassall, choir master at St Martin in the Bull Ring, at the Birmingham and Midland Institute. He joined an accountancy firm and was often torn between auditing duties and singing tenor solos in local oratorio performances. At the age of 21 he auditioned for D'Oyly Carte Opera Company, when the company was appearing in Birmingham, and after a second audition in London on the day he was meant to be doing an audit in Wales, he was accepted as a chorister in the company and gave up his desk job.

== Early career ==
Webster Booth made his first professional stage appearance with D'Oyly Carte as a chorister in The Yeomen of the Guard on 9 September 1923 at the Theatre Royal, Brighton, under the name Leslie W. Booth. During four seasons with the company, he played chorus roles and a few very small parts in other Gilbert and Sullivan comic operas. Malcolm Sargent became musical director for the 1926 season, and in later years, Webster Booth was to become one of Sargent's favourite tenors, and made frequent appearances with the Royal Choral Society under Sargent's baton. After a D'Oyly Carte tour of Canada in 1927, Booth felt that he was making little progress in the company and left to pursue his singing career. He returned in 1931, as Webster Booth, to participate in D'Oyly Carte's abridged recording of The Gondoliers as Luiz.

He had married Winifred Keey in London in 1924 and their son, Keith Leslie Booth was born the following year on 12 June 1925. Winifred deserted him and their son in 1927, leaving Booth to bring up his young son with the help of his parents and a faithful housekeeper. The couple divorced in 1931. After Booth left the D'Oyly Carte, he took the stage name of Webster Booth and did freelance singing work. He became a member of Tom Howell's Opieros Concert Party for several seasons, sang in cabaret at various Lyons Restaurants, sang at after-dinner entertainments at numerous Masonic and Guild dinners, and appeared for two seasons in pantomime with Tom Howells at the Brixton Theatre in 1927 and 1928.

In 1927 he became a member of the Concert Artistes Association and sang at many concerts there. Years later, in 1953 and 1954, he and Anne Ziegler became joint presidents of the association. He was also a member of the Savage Club. He appeared on TV in the fledgling Baird system TV service broadcasting from Daventry. His work was largely of a light nature but he did not abandon oratorio. On 3 November 1928, aged 26, he was tenor soloist in a performance of Messiah at Birmingham Town Hall with the Choral and Orchestral Union. He sang in many oratorio performances for the rest of his career and at the age of 71 said that singing in oratorio had meant more to him than anything else he had done in his long and varied singing career.

In 1929 he was signed by HMV and made many recordings during the next 22 years. In 1930 he made his West End debut in a principal role as the Duke of Buckingham in Rudolf Friml's The Three Musketeers, starring Dennis King at the Theatre Royal, Drury Lane. By the early thirties he was an established singer. He met his second wife, Dorothy Annie Alice Prior (stage name, Paddy Prior) when she heard him sing in a concert at the Concert Artistes Association. She was a soubrette, mezzo-soprano and comedian who had worked in the theatre since her late teens. A year after his divorce from Winifred Keey, the couple married at the Fulham Registry Office on 10 October 1932.

Booth was engaged in Powis Pinder's Sunshine concert party at the Summer Theatre, Shanklin on the Isle of Wight for the 1931 and 1932 seasons. There he met and became friends with comedian Arthur Askey, a fellow member of the party. In 1933 Booth and Paddy appeared together in the Piccadilly Revels concert party at Scarborough and the following year both were engaged with Sunshine at Shanklin. At the end of 1934 Booth was selected to sing Faust in a colour film entitled The Faust Fantasy. Irene Frances Eastwood (stage name Anne Ziegler) was chosen to play Marguerite. He also sang in the 1935 film The Invader.

By 1935 he was recording and broadcasting frequently and fulfilling many joint engagements with Paddy Prior. In April 1935 he played Juan opposite French actress Jacqueline Francell in Kurt Weill's A Kingdom for a Cow at the Savoy Theatre, but this musical play did not appeal to London audiences and closed after three weeks. He made several films, including The Robber Symphony in 1935, with music composed and conducted by Friedrich Feher, who also directed the film. Booth sang several Feher songs in the film, including one in Italian.

Despite this lighter work, he did not neglect his oratorio singing and was chosen for the Good Friday performance of Messiah on 10 April 1936 at the Royal Albert Hall with the Royal Choral Society, and the London Philharmonic Orchestra conducted by Malcolm Sargent, and a month later he again sang at the Royal Albert Hall in Hiawatha's Wedding Feast by Samuel Coleridge-Taylor, with the whole cast in full traditional costume.

He sang in Der Rosenkavalier and was a guard in The Magic Flute in the International Opera Season at Covent Garden in 1938. The fee was paltry in comparison to what he had been earning, and he vowed to avoid opera in the future, although he made many operatic recordings and broadcasts.

== Later career ==
Later that year, his marriage to Paddy Prior ended in divorce, and he married Anne Ziegler on 5 November 1938. The two had been singing duets together from the beginning of 1938 and were well received by the public. They made their first duet recordings for HMV in 1939 and in 1940 were asked to take their act on the Variety Circuit by theatrical agent, Julius Darewski. They were an immediate success and achieved international fame as "sweethearts of song" during the war.

In 1941 they appeared in George Black's London Palladium production of Gangway with Bebe Daniels, Ben Lyon and Tommy Trinder, and in 1943 they starred in a revival of Friml's Vagabond King on a country-wide tour which culminated in a season at the Winter Garden Theatre, London. In 1945 they starred in Kenneth Leslie-Smith's musical play Sweet Yesterday. first on tour and then at the Adelphi Theatre, London. They were guest singing stars in two films, Demobbed and Waltz Time, and in 1945 they starred in a British National film entitled The Laughing Lady. In the same year they were invited to sing at the Victory Royal Command Performance on 5 November, their seventh wedding anniversary. From 1943 they sang at innumerable concerts all over the country for Harold Fielding with fellow artistes such as Peter Dawson and Rawicz and Landauer. In 1948 they toured Australia and New Zealand and managed to do several broadcasts in South Africa while their ship was sailing around South African ports. During these years, they also toured in their own production of A Night in Venice.

In 1951 Booth's contract with HMV was suddenly cancelled. By this time variety theatres were in their twilight years. The post-war generation preferred to see American entertainers at the London Palladium or new British acts fresh from the tough training ground of forces entertainment. Calypso, skiffle and rock 'n roll became the favoured musical entertainment. While Anne and Booth still had a lot of work, their refined act was not as popular as it had been during the war.

For the last five years of their career in Britain (1950–55), their regular accompanist was Geoffrey Parsons. Some years later, Parsons said in an interview, "The intensity of their shimmering love duets was equalled only by the bitterness of their backstage rows".

== Emigration to South Africa ==
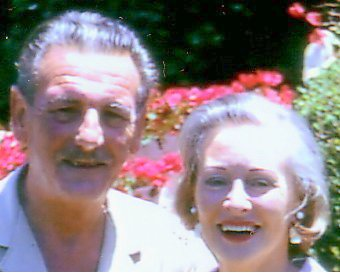
Anne Ziegler and Booth in their garden, Knysna, South Africa, 1968

In 1955 Booth and Ziegler did a concert tour of the Cape Province, South Africa. They were invited back for a more extensive tour of southern Africa the following year and, after some heart searching, decided to leave the UK and settle in South Africa in July 1956. They did many shows, concerts and broadcasts and ventured into producing musicals for amateur operatic societies. They established a school of singing and stagecraft in Johannesburg, made an LP recording of their popular duets translated into Afrikaans and trained many promising singers.

For the first time in their careers they appeared in non-singing roles in various plays. Booth was the Prawn in The Amorous Prawn in 1961, and he and Ziegler played Mr and Mrs Fordyce in Goodnight Mrs Puffin in 1963. Booth turned the clock back in 1963 when he played Colonel Fairfax in The Yeomen of the Guard for the Johannesburg Operatic and Dramatic Society at very short notice. He also played the non-singing part of the circus barker in Smetana's The Bartered Bride for the Performing Arts Council of the Transvaal in November/December 1966 shortly before he and Anne left Johannesburg for Knysna in the Cape Province.

Booth was tenor soloist at the Port Elizabeth Oratorio Festival under the direction of Robert Selley from 1958 to 1962, and under the direction of organist, Keith Jewell he sang in the first performance in South Africa of Elgar's Dream of Gerontius in Cape Town, a work in which he had often sung in the United Kingdom. He had always wanted to sing the bass solos in oratorio and when he and Anne moved to the coastal town of Knysna in 1967 and he became conductor of the Knysna and District Choral Society, he sang the bass arias in excerpts from Mendelssohn's Elijah. Ziegler and Booth gave their farewell concert in Somerset West in 1975, believing that their singing days were at an end.

== Return to the United Kingdom ==
In 1978 Ziegler and Booth returned to the United Kingdom. Booth was 76 and Ziegler was 68. The plan was that they would retire quietly to Penrhyn Bay in North Wales. They were surprised to find that they were still remembered by their old fans and for several years they did broadcasts on radio and television, gave talks and concerts all over the country, and appeared in a Royal Variety Performance before Prince Charles, Prince of Wales at the Grand Theatre, Blackpool in 1981. But by the early eighties Booth's health was failing. He died on 21 June 1984 at the age of 82. Ziegler lived on alone in Wales and died on 13 October 2003 at the age of 93.

In June 1994, Booth was the subject of BBC Radio 2 documentary, The Webster Booth Story, presented by Robin Gregory, in which Ziegler appeared.

In 1985 Jean Buckley, their lifelong fan and friend began raising funds to establish the Webster Booth Scholarship at the Royal Northern College of Music, Manchester. The first award was made to tenor Geraint Dodd in 1986. In 1990 Esso and an anonymous sponsor jointly sponsored the Scholarship until the late nineties, and in 1991 a further award was created at the College in Anne Ziegler's name. When Esso withdrew its sponsorship there was not enough money left to continue the Webster Booth award in its present form. The last award was presented to Scottish soprano Lee Bisset in 2002.

The Anne Ziegler prize was awarded by the college to a promising singer each year until 2015. Until 2005 the prize was awarded by competition, but after that the award was made by the head of the Department of Vocal and Opera studies in consultation with members of staff. The college had been funding the award for some time without any external funding, so it was decided to stop awarding the prize several years ago.

== Bibliography ==
- Booth, Webster and Anne Ziegler, Duet, London: Stanley Paul, 1951
- Collen, Jean Sweethearts of Song: a personal memoir of Anne Ziegler and Webster Booth, Lulu, South Africa, 2006
- Collen, Jean & Davies, Pamela Do you remember Anne Ziegler and Webster Booth?, Lulu, South Africa, 2008
- Collen, Jean A Scattered Garland: Gleanings from the lives of Webster Booth and Anne Ziegler, Lulu, South Africa, 2008

== Selected filmography ==
- The Invader (1935)
- The Robber Symphony (1936)
- Sunshine Ahead (1936)
- Saturday Night Revue (1937)
- Demobbed (1944)
- The Laughing Lady (1946)
