= Anne Ziegler =

English singer (1910–2003)

Webster Booth (left) and Ziegler (right)

Anne Ziegler (born Irené Frances Eastwood; 22 June 1910 – 13 October 2003) was an English singer, known for her light operatic duets with her husband Webster Booth. The pair were known as the "Sweethearts in Song" and were among the most famous and popular British musical acts of the 1940s.

== Life and career ==
Ziegler was born on 22 June 1910, in the Sefton Park area of Liverpool, and attended The Belvedere School. She trained as a classical pianist, and studied singing. In 1933, she began singing professionally as a soprano, changing her name to Anne Ziegler when she made her West End stage debut in 1934, in the chorus of By Appointment. The same year, she was chosen to play Marguerite in a film, The Faust Fantasy. While making the film she met and fell in love with the tenor Webster Booth, who was married at the time. In 1937, credited as Anne Booth, she appeared on Broadway as Sylvia Laurence in Arthur Schwartz's Virginia and, in 1938, Booth divorced his second wife and married Ziegler.

They made their first duet recordings for His Master's Voice in 1939, and in 1940 were asked to take their act on the Variety Circuit by theatrical agent, Julius Darewski. In 1941, they appeared in George Black’s London Palladium production of Gangway with Bebe Daniels and Ben Lyon, and Tommy Trinder, and in 1943 starred in a revival of Friml’s Vagabond King on a country-wide tour which culminated in a season at the Winter Garden Theatre, London. They became known for bringing glamour to wartime Britain, with Ziegler often wearing dresses by Norman Hartnell. Their signature songs included "Only a Rose" and "We'll Gather Lilacs".

In 1945, they starred in Kenneth Leslie-Smith’s musical play Sweet Yesterday, first on tour and then at the Adelphi Theatre, London. They were guest singing stars in two films, Demobbed and Waltz Time, and in 1945 also starred in a British National film entitled The Laughing Lady. In the same year they were invited to sing at the Victory Royal Command Performance. From 1943 they sang at innumerable concerts all over the country for Harold Fielding, and in 1948 they toured in Australia, New Zealand and South Africa.

In 1951, they published an autobiography, Duet, but their style was becoming old-fashioned and they fell out of favour, emigrating to South Africa in the mid-1950s. They returned to the UK in 1978, settling in Llandudno in North Wales, and broadcasting and presenting An evening with Anne Ziegler and Webster Booth.

Ziegler died on 13 October 2003, aged 93, at Colwyn Bay. A biography of the couple, Sweethearts of Song: A Personal Memoir of Anne Ziegler and Webster Booth, by Jean Collen, was published in 2006.

== Selected filmography ==
- Demobbed (1944)
- The Laughing Lady (1946)
