= The Lady Vanishes (disambiguation) =

The Lady Vanishes is a 1938 film by Alfred Hitchcock and starring Margaret Lockwood.

The Lady Vanishes may also refer to:

- The Lady Vanishes (novel) or The Wheel Spins, a 1936 mystery novel by Ethel Lina White
- The Lady Vanishes (1979 film), a film starring Cybill Shepherd
- The Lady Vanishes (2013 film), a film starring Tuppence Middleton
- The Lady Vanishes, a 2019 crime podcast series by Seven News
- "The Lady Vanishes", an episode of The Commish
- "The Lady Vanishes", an episode of Dallas
- "The Lady Vanishes", a 2012 episode of The Fifth Estate
- "The Lady Vanishes", an episode of 2point4 children
- "The Lady Vanishes", an episode of Sexton Blake
- "The Lady Vanishes", an episode of Wings
