= They See in Darkness =

1944 novel

- Author: Ethel Lina White
- Language: English
- Genre: Mystery Thriller
- Publisher: Collins Crime Club
- Publication date: 1944
- Publication place: United Kingdom
- Media type: Print

They See in Darkness is a 1944 mystery thriller novel by the British writer Ethel Lina White. It was the final novel of White, who had enjoyed success with novels such as The Wheel Spins. It was published by the Collins Crime Club.

== Synopsis ==
In the small, picturesque market town of Oldtown in England, a number of the beneficiaries inheriting from a wealthy man turn up dead. Paranoia begins to grip the small town, increased by a mysterious sisterhood inhabiting a mansion.

== Bibliography ==
- Reilly, John M. Twentieth Century Crime & Mystery Writers. Springer, 2015.
