= She Faded into Air =

1941 novel

- Author: Ethel Lina White
- Language: English
- Genre: Mystery
- Publisher: Collins Crime Club (UK); Harper Brothers (US)
- Publication date: 1941
- Publication place: United Kingdom
- Media type: Print

She Faded into Air is a 1941 mystery novel by the British writer Ethel Lina White, originally published by the Collins Crime Club. It received relatively mixed reviews, but White followed it up with her success Midnight House in 1942. Although published at the height of the Second World War, the novel makes no reference to the ongoing conflict, a common feature of wartime mystery and detective novels.

== Synopsis ==
Shortly after entering Pomerania House, a converted London eighteenth century mansion now used for business, Evelyn Cross vanishes into thin air. Due to her prompt assistance in the matter, out-of-work film extra Viola Green is hired as a companion for the daughter of an American millionaire. Several days later Evelyn returns, but is discovered strangled to death. Despite their extra vigilance, the millionaire's daughter is then kidnapped from Pomerania House in similar circumstances.

== Bibliography ==
- Peacock, Scott. Contemporary Authors, Volume 167. Gale, 1998.
- Reilly, John M. Twentieth Century Crime & Mystery Writers. Springer, 2015.
