= The Spiral Staircase (2000 film) =

2000 American television film directed by James Head

- Based on: Some Must Watch by Ethel Lina White
- Screenplay by: Matt Dorff
- Directed by: James Head
- Starring: Nicollette Sheridan; Judd Nelson; Debbe Dunning; Holland Taylor; Christina Jastrzembska
- Music by: Yuval Ron
- Country of origin: United States
- Original language: English

Production
- Producers: Shawn Williamson; Amy Goldberg
- Cinematography: Gordon Verheul
- Editor: Grace Yuen
- Running time: 88 minutes
- Production company: Shavick Entertainment

Original release
- Release: April 2, 2000

The Spiral Staircase is a 2000 television film remake of the 1946 film The Spiral Staircase based on Ethel Lina White's 1933 novel Some Must Watch. The film was directed by James Head with a screenplay by Matt Dorff, and stars Nicollette Sheridan, Judd Nelson, Alex McArthur, Debbe Dunning and Holland Taylor.

== Background ==
The Ethel Lina White novel Some Must Watch was first offered on film in 1946 as The Spiral Staircase. This same title was used for a 1961 television adaptation, 1975 British TV-movie remake, and the 2000 made-for-cable feature. The 2000 version updated the original story to re-set from the early 20th century to present day. Filmed on locations in Vancouver and Victoria, Canada, the 2000 version was made for Fox Family network (now Freeform), as a remake of three previous films, still based on Ethel Lina White's novel, and using the same title as the previous films of 1946, 1961, and 1975.

== Synopsis ==
The film centers around Helen Capel (Nicollette Sheridan), a pathologically mute woman who is being stalked by a vicious killer. Mute since the death of her parents when she was a child, Helen accepts a nursing position on a secluded island in the household of wealthy matriarch Emma Warren (Holland Taylor). Helen learns that a serial killer is picking off "imperfect" young girls around town, and she fears she is next. A terrible storm hits the island one night and the family and Helen are trapped inside... and they're not alone; the killer is with them in the shadows.

== Cast ==
- Nicollette Sheridan as Helen Capel
- Judd Nelson as Phillip Warren
- Debbe Dunning as Danielle
- Holland Taylor as Emma Warren
- Christina Jastrzembska as Rachel Parsons
- William McDonald as Sheriff Bell
- John Innes as Dr. Porter
- Margaret Ryan as Mrs. Pritzker
- Kandyse McClure as Monica
- Charles Payne as Medical Examiner
- A.J. Cook as Local Girl
- Kristina Matisic as Newscaster
- Alex McArthur as Steven Warren
- Dolores Drake as Sarah
- David Storch as Bobby Tyler
- Lillian Carlson as Mrs. Winfield
- Brenda Campbell as Elise
- Dallas Thompson as Linda
- Katrina Matthews as Cocktail Waitress

== Release ==
The film debuted in April 2000 in the United States, followed by releases in the United Kingdom in May 2000, France in 2001 as Le secret du manoir, Czech Republic in 2003, Germany in 2004 as Stummer Schrei - Und keiner kann dir helfen, Hungary in 2005 and Sweden in 2007.

== Reception ==
In noting that the original 1946 film was "a stellar thriller", Steven Linan of the Los Angeles Times found the 2000 remake to be an "inferior remake".
