= The Elephant Never Forgets =

1937 novel

- American first edition
- Author: Ethel Lina White
- Language: English
- Genre: Thriller
- Publisher: Collins Crime Club (UK); Harper Brothers (US)
- Publication date: 1937
- Publication place: United Kingdom
- Media type: Print

The Elephant Never Forgets is a 1937 thriller novel by the British writer Ethel Lina White. It was published in the United Kingdom by the Collins Crime Club and in America by Harper Brothers. White was an established mystery writer, whose novel The Wheel Spins was made into the film The Lady Vanishes the following year.

== Synopsis ==
It portrays a group of foreigners trying to escape from the Soviet Union and the OGPU secret police of the Stalin era.

== Bibliography ==
- Reilly, John M. Twentieth Century Crime & Mystery Writers. Springer, 2015.
- Turnbull, Malcolm J. Victims Or Villains: Jewish Images in Classic English Detective Fiction. Popular Press, 1998.
