= Andrea King =

American actress (1919–2003)

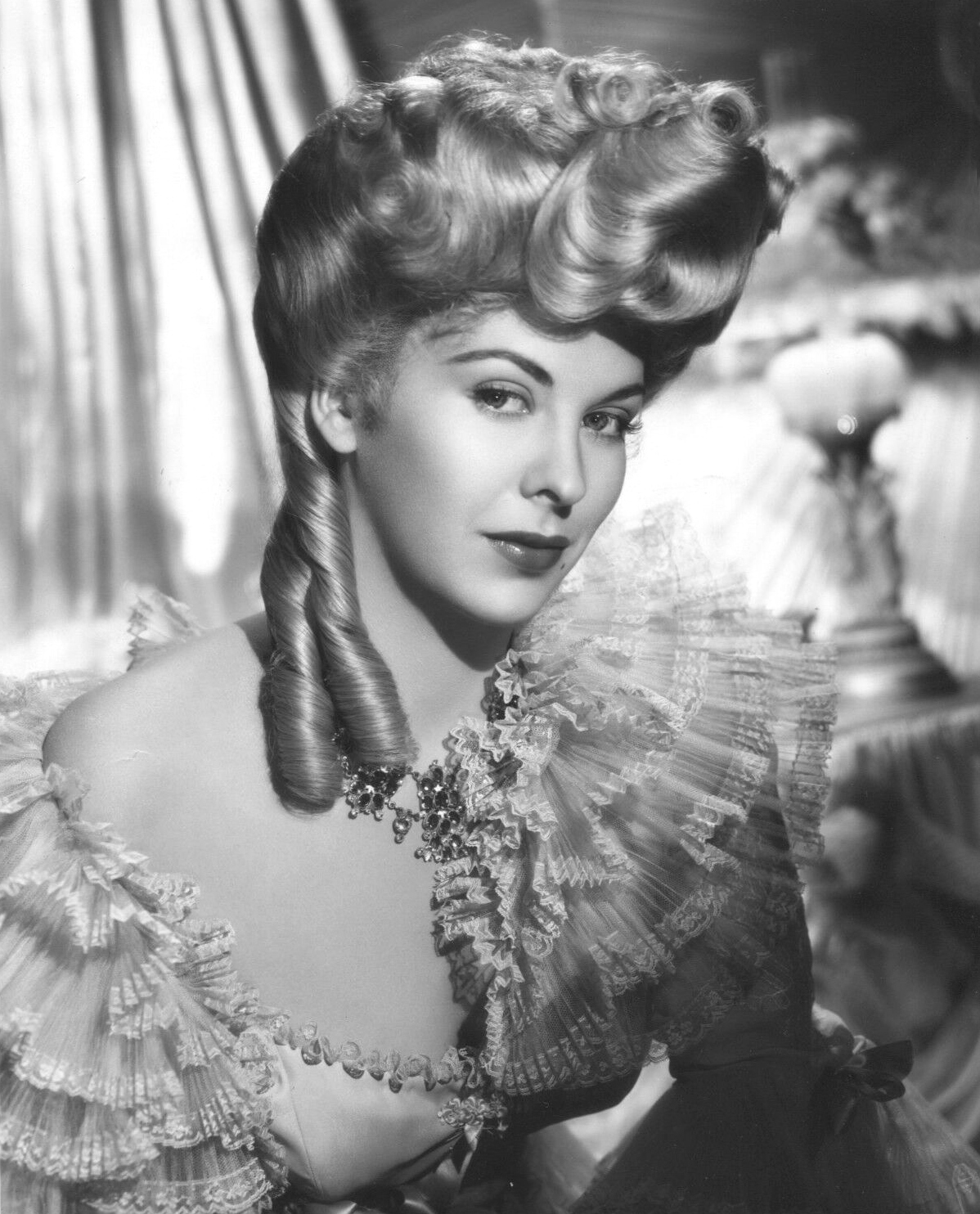
- King in a publicity portrait for My Wild Irish Rose (1947)
- Born: Georgette André Barry; February 1, 1919; Paris, France
- Died: April 22, 2003 (aged 84); Woodland Hills, Los Angeles, California, U.S.
- Resting place: Zion Episcopal Churchyard in Charles Town, West Virginia
- Years active: 1933–1994
- Spouse: Nat Willis (m. 1940; died 1970)
- Children: 1

Andrea King (born Georgette André Barry; February 1, 1919 – April 22, 2003) was an American stage, film, and television actress, sometimes billed as Georgette McKee.

== Early life ==
Andrea King was born Georgette André Barry on February 1, 1919, in Paris, France. Her English-French father was Andre Barry. (Another source says, "King may have been the illegitimate daughter of a Washington diplomat her mother had known in France during the war. The truth remains unknown.") At the age of two months, she and her American mother, Lovina Belle Hart, moved to the United States. Her mother attended Columbia University in New York City and was a drama coach. Her father was an aviator who was killed in wartime.

When her mother married Douglas McKee, King went to live with them in Forest Hills, Queens. Her education at the Ruth Doing School included instruction in "Greed-robe-weaving and barefoot dancing". As a teenager, King attended the progressive Edgewood School in Greenwich, Connecticut, a northern campus of Marietta Johnson's Organic School of Education. Playing Juliet in a school production when she was 14, she was asked to audition for a role in a Lee Shubert play, which led to other stage work.

== Career ==
=== Theatre ===
King began appearing as a child actress in Broadway plays and other stage work. Her Broadway credits included Growing Pains (1933) and Fly Away Home (1935). She also appeared as Mary Skinner in Life with Father.

=== Film ===
Her film debut was in a docudrama, The March of Time's first feature-length film titled The Ramparts We Watch (1940). In 1944, she signed with Warner Bros. and changed her stage name to King (some of her early movies have her credited as "Georgette McKee", her stepfather's name). Warner signed her for the film The Very Thought of You (1944), casting her as the younger sister of the character that Ida Lupino was to play because of her resemblance to the actress. Lupino was replaced by Eleanor Parker, but King remained in the film. King appeared uncredited in the Bette Davis film Mr. Skeffington (1944), followed by another ten movies in the next three years. The Warner Bros. studio photographers voted King the most photogenic actress for the year 1945.

She co-starred in the mystery-horror film, The Beast with Five Fingers (1946), and a drama, The Man I Love (1947), both opposite Robert Alda. King was originally cast to play Dr. Lilith Ritter in Nightmare Alley, a film noir directed by Edmund Goulding, but she chose instead the role of the sophisticated Marjorie Lundeen in Ride the Pink Horse (1947).

In the 1950s, King had leading roles in the film noirs Dial 1119 and Southside 1-1000 (both 1950) and a science-fiction story, Red Planet Mars (1952). She later played supporting roles in Hollywood feature films such as The World in His Arms (1952), and Band of Angels (1957).

=== Television ===
On May 1, 1953, King co-starred in the episode "Medicine Man" on Schlitz Playhouse of Stars on CBS. In the 1960s and 1970s, most of her acting work was on television, including the ABC/Warner Bros. Television Western series Maverick's episode "Two Tickets to Ten Strike" opposite James Garner. In 1959–60, she appeared twice as Duchess in the episodes "The Blizzard" and "The Devil Made Fire" of another ABC/WB Western series, The Alaskans, as well as in multiple episodes of the ABC/WB private-eye series 77 Sunset Strip and Hawaiian Eye. She guest-starred in a 1960 episode of The Tom Ewell Show.

She made four guest appearances on Perry Mason between 1959 and 1963, including the role of murderer Barbara Heywood in the 1959 episode, "The Case of the Bedeviled Doctor". King continued to act on television until 1990, when she played her final role on the Murder, She Wrote episode, "The Fixer-Upper". In 1994, she went into retirement officially following her appeeance in Inveitable Grace (1994). She appeared twice more as herself on the A&E series, Biography, recalling her work with Peter Lorre and Montgomery Clift.

For her contribution to television, she received a star on the Hollywood Walk of Fame in February 1960.

== Personal life ==
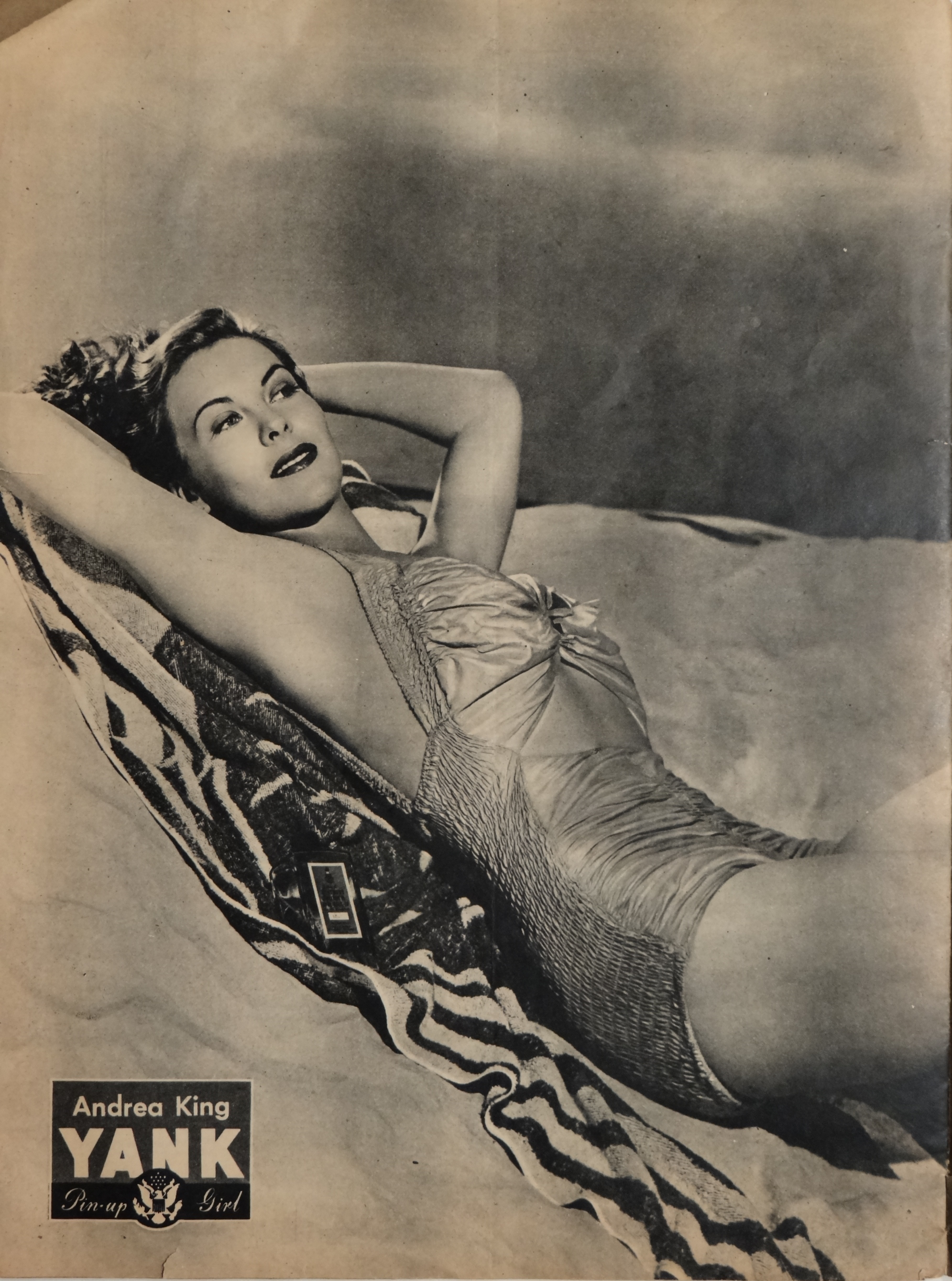
Andrea King pin-up from Yank, The Army Weekly, August 1945

King was married to lawyer Nat Willis from 1940 until his death in 1970. They had a daughter. Later in life, following her retierment from acting, she focused on creative writing, authoring multiple children's books and short stories.

King was a devout, lifelong Episcopalian who actively worshiped at multiple historic parishes throughout her life. While living in Southern California, she frequently attended services at both All Saints' Episcopal Church in Beverly Hills and St. James' Episcopal Church on Wilshire Boulevard, and she regularly worshiped at Zion Episcopal Church in Charles Town, West Virginia, during her visits within the region. She combined her faith and career through her dedicated involvement with the Episcopal Actors Guild, eventually serving as the organization's vice-president.

King was a staunch Democrat who actively participated in political advocacy throughout her life. She was an active member of both the Hollywood Democratic Committee and the Committee for the First Amendment. She consistently used her platform to support progressive leadership, campaigning for and endorsing several Democratic presidential candidates including Franklin D. Roosevelt, Harry S. Truman, Adlai Stevenson, John F. Kennedy, Robert Kennedy, Lyndon Johnson, Jimmy Carter, Walter Mondale, Michael Dukakis, Bill Clinton, and Bill Bradley.

== Death ==
On April 22, 2003, King died in hospice care while in residence at the Motion Picture and Television Country House and Hospital, in Woodland Hills, California. She is interred beside her husband within the Willis Family Plot at Zion Episcopal Churchyard in Charles Town, West Virginia.
