= Beware, My Lovely =

1952 film by Harry Horner

- Movie poster
- Directed by: Harry Horner
- Written by: Mel Dinelli
- Based on: The Man by Mel Dinelli
- Produced by: Collier Young for The Filmakers
- Starring: Ida Lupino; Robert Ryan; Taylor Holmes
- Cinematography: George E. Diskant
- Edited by: Paul Weatherwax
- Music by: Leith Stevens
- Production company: The Filmakers
- Distributed by: RKO Radio Pictures
- Release date: September 12, 1952 (New York)
- Running time: 77 minutes
- Country: United States
- Language: English

Beware, My Lovely is a 1952 American crime film noir directed by Harry Horner and starring Ida Lupino, Robert Ryan and Taylor Holmes. The film is based on the 1950 play The Man by Mel Dinelli, who also wrote the screenplay.

== Plot ==
A widow named Helen Gordon impulsively hires handyman Howard Wilton to help her with house repairs and cleaning, but she quickly discovers that he is dangerous, paranoid and unstable. Howard keeps Helen inside the house for the entire day and she cannot summon help or escape.

== Cast ==
- Ida Lupino as Helen Gordon
- Robert Ryan as Howard Wilton
- Taylor Holmes as Walter Armstrong
- Barbara Whiting as Ruth Williams
- James Willmas as Mr. Stevens
- O. Z. Whitehead as Mr. Franks

== Production ==
The play on which the film is based, The Man, was originally a short story written by Mel Dinelli, who also adapted the story for the stage. It debuted on Broadway in January 1950 with Dorothy Gish in the starring role. The story was also featured on the CBS radio show Suspense as "To Find Help" on January 18, 1945 with Frank Sinatra and Agnes Moorehead. It was dramatized again as an episode of Suspense with Gene Kelly and Ethel Barrymore on January 6, 1949.

The film was shot over an 18-day period in 1951 for Collier Young and Ida Lupino's production company the Filmakers. RKO Pictures head Howard Hughes withheld the film from release for a year. Robert Ryan later said that he felt that Hughes had tried to "bury" the film because Ryan was active in left-wing politics.

Earlier in 1952, Lupino and Ryan had costarred in On Dangerous Ground, a film noir directed by Nicholas Ray and produced by John Houseman.

The story was the basis for a 1960 episode of the TV anthology Startime, with Audie Murphy and Thelma Ritter.

== Reception ==
In a contemporary review for The New York Times, critic Bosley Crowther wrote: "It is a straight tour-de-force situation, clearly contrived and designed for no other positive purpose than to send shivers chasing up and down the spine. And in that respectable endeavor, its success will depend entirely upon how susceptible you are to illogic and little tricks of looming shadows and clutching hands."
