= Wax (Ethel Lina White novel) =

1935 novel

- First Edition (UK)
- Author: Ethel Lina White
- Language: English
- Genre: Mystery
- Published: 1935
- Publisher: Collins Crime Club
- Publication place: United Kingdom

Wax is a 1935 mystery novel by British author Ethel Lina White.

== Plot ==
Wax is set in the small, fictional town of Riverpool. On the outskirts of the town is a mysterious Waxwork museum with a dark history. Young journalist Sonia Thompson arrives at the town to work at the local newspaper, and is instantly intrigued by the museum. She meets the suspicious townspeople and soon predicts there will be another death at the museum. Very soon she is proved right, and it is up to Sonia to bust the legends surrounding the Waxworks and to discover who the real killer is.

== Publication ==
Wax hadn't been in print for many years, and was difficult to get hold of in book form. However, Valancourt Books published a new edition in 2015. The book is also available to read on Project Gutenberg Australia. Wax is a reworking of an earlier short story, “Waxworks” first published in the December 1930 issue of Pearson’s Magazine and recently republished in Otto Penzler's Big Book of Christmas Mysteries (2013) and Silent Nights -- Christmas Mysteries edited by Martin Edwards (2015).
