= Red Planet Mars =

1952 film by Harry Horner

- Theatrical release poster
- Directed by: Harry Horner
- Screenplay by: Anthony Veiller; John L. Balderston
- Based on: the play Red Planet by John L. Balderston and John Hoare
- Produced by: Donald Hyde; Anthony Veiller
- Starring: Peter Graves; Andrea King; Orley Lindgren; Walter Sande; Marvin Miller
- Cinematography: Joseph Biroc
- Edited by: Francis D. Lyon
- Music by: Mahlon Merrick
- Production company: Melaby Pictures
- Distributed by: United Artists
- Release date: May 15, 1952 (United States)
- Running time: 87 minutes
- Country: United States
- Language: English

Red Planet Mars is a 1952 American science fiction film released by United Artists starring Peter Graves and Andrea King. It is based on a 1932 play Red Planet written by John L. Balderston and John Hoare and was directed by art director Harry Horner in his directorial debut.

== Plot summary ==
An American astronomer obtains images of Mars suggesting large-scale environmental changes are occurring at a pace that can only be accomplished by intelligent beings with advanced technology. Scientist Chris Cronyn (Peter Graves) and his wife, Linda (Andrea King) have been contacting Mars by a hydrogen-powered radio transmitter, using technology based on the work of Nazi scientist Franz Calder. They communicate first through an exchange of mathematical concepts, like the value of pi, and then through answers to specific questions about Martian life. The transmissions claim that Mars is a utopia, which has led to great technological advancement and the elimination of scarcity, and there is no fear of a nuclear war.

This revelation leads to political and economic chaos, especially in the Western hemisphere, and is said to have "done more to smash the democratic world in the last four weeks than the Russians have been able to do in eleven years". The U.S. government imposes a news blackout and orders the transmissions to stop due to fears that the Soviet Union could pick up and decode their messages. This ends when the next message reveals that the Earth is condemned to the constant fear of nuclear war as a punishment for straying from the teachings of the Bible. Revolution sweeps the globe, including the Soviet Union, which is overthrown and replaced by a theocracy, which is met with celebration in America.

The messages cease. Calder, armed with a handgun, confronts the Cronyns in their lab. He wants to announce that he has been duping the world with false messages from a secret Soviet-funded radio transmitter high in the Andes mountains of South America. The transmitter was destroyed by an avalanche. There have been no transmissions since then. He shows them his log. When Linda raises the question of the religious messages, Calder is contemptuous. He says that he transmitted the original messages supposedly from Mars, but that the United States government made up the religious messages, which he allowed because he wanted to see the destruction of the Soviet Union. The Cronyns know that the religious messages were not hoaxes, but Calder's claim will be believed and it will mean disaster for a now peaceful Earth. Unseen by Calder, Chris opens the valve to the hydrogen supply and tells Linda to leave. Calder refuses to allow it. She asks her husband for a cigarette. He says quietly that in all their years together he has never seen her smoke. They both know the spark will ignite the hydrogen and destroy the lab. But before Chris can use his lighter, a message begins to come through and an enraged Calder fires into the screen, blowing up the transmitter, himself and the Cronyns before the message is complete. However, the first part is decoded, and later the President reads it aloud to the world: "You have done well my good..." the rest evoking the Parable of the Talents in the Gospel of Matthew: "You have done well, my good and faithful servant."

== Cast ==
- Peter Graves as Chris Cronyn
- Andrea King as Linda Cronyn
- Herbert Berghof as Franz Calder
- Walter Sande as Admiral Bill Carey
- Marvin Miller as Arjenian
- Willis Bouchey as President
- Morris Ankrum as Secretary of Defense Sparks
- Robert House Peters, Jr. as Dr. Boulting, Mitchell's assistant
- Orley Lindgren as Stewart Cronyn
- Philip Bayard Veiller (Bayard Veiller II) as Roger Cronyn

== Reception ==
=== Critical response ===
When the film was released, the staff at Variety liked the film, writing, "Despite its title, Red Planet Mars takes place on terra firma, sans space ships, cosmic rays or space cadets. It is a fantastic concoction delving into the realms of science, politics, religion, world affairs and Communism [...] Despite the hokum dished out, the actors concerned turn in creditable performances."

The New York Times, while giving the film a mixed review, wrote well of some of the performances, "Peter Graves and Andrea King are serious and competent, if slightly callow in appearance, as the indomitable scientists. Marvin Miller is standard as a top Soviet agent, as are Walter Sande, Richard Powers and Morris Ankrum, as Government military men, and Willis Bouchey, as the President."

Allmovie critic Bruce Eder praised the film, writing, "Red Planet Mars is an eerily fascinating artifact of the era of the Red Scare, and also the first postwar science fiction boom, combining those elements into an eerie story that is all the more surreal because it is played with such earnestness."

The film critic Dennis Schwartz panned the film in 2001, writing, "One of the most obnoxious sci-fi films ever. It offers Hollywood's silly response to the 1950s 'Red Scare' sweeping the country".

British critic Leslie Halliwell described the film as "lunatic farrago that has to be seen to be believed".
