= James Head (director) =

Canadian television director

James David Head is a Canadian television director.

== Career ==
=== Cameraman ===
Head began his career as a cameraman on various film crews. In 1985, he was a second assistant camera for the concert film 9012Live by Yes. In 1987, he was a second assistant camera for the film Stakeout. He then worked as a first assistant camera on Beyond the Stars (1989), The Fourth War (1990), Run (1991), And the Sea Will Tell (1991), and Bingo (1991).

=== Early years as a director ===
Head made his directorial debut in 1991, directing at least one episode of TV's The Commish, but did not become a full-time director at that time. He was second unit director of photography for Man of the House (1995) and Fear (1996). He was back as a director in 1996, directing at least one episode of F/X: The Series. In 1997, he directed an episode of The Adventures of Sinbad, and during the 1996–97 season, he has directors credits for three episodes of Two. During the 1998-99 TV season, he directed two episodes of The Crow: Stairway to Heaven, an episode of Nothing Too Good for a Cowboy, an episode of Poltergeist: The Legacy, and five episodes of Earth: Final Conflict. Between 1998 and 2001, he directed six episodes of The Outer Limits . In 2000, he was second unit director on First Target and he directed a television film remake of The Spiral Staircase. In 2001, he was second unit director on Just Cause and also directed at least one episode of Wolf Lake. In 2002, he was second unit director for two episodes of Jeremiah and then went on to direct two episodes of the series.

=== Recent accomplishments ===
From 2003 onward, Head has been regularly employed full-time as a television director. His directorial credits have included an episode of The Twilight Zone (2003), at least one episode of 1-800-Missing (2003), an episode of Stargate Atlantis (2004), twenty episodes of The Dead Zone (2003-2007), an episode of Battlestar Galactica (2006), at least one episode of Kaya (2007), four episodes of Reaper (2007-2008), two episodes of Sanctuary (2008), three episodes of Kyle XY (2008-2009), and an episode of Eureka (2009).
