= The Spiral Staircase (1946 film) =

1946 film by Robert Siodmak

- Original theatrical poster
- Directed by: Robert Siodmak
- Screenplay by: Mel Dinelli
- Based on: Some Must Watch by Ethel Lina White
- Produced by: Dore Schary
- Starring: Dorothy McGuire; George Brent; Ethel Barrymore; Kent Smith; Rhonda Fleming; Gordon Oliver; Elsa Lanchester
- Cinematography: Nicholas Musuraca
- Edited by: Harry Marker; Harry Gerstad
- Music by: Roy Webb
- Production companies: RKO Radio Pictures; Vanguard Films
- Distributed by: RKO Radio Pictures
- Release date: February 6, 1946
- Running time: 84 minutes
- Country: United States
- Language: English
- Budget: $750,000
- Box office: $2.8 million (U.S. rentals)

The Spiral Staircase is a 1946 American psychological horror film directed by Robert Siodmak and starring Dorothy McGuire, George Brent, and Ethel Barrymore. Set over the course of one evening, the film follows a mute young woman in an early-20th century Vermont town who is stalked and terrorized in a rural mansion by a serial killer targeting women with disabilities. Kent Smith, Rhonda Fleming, Gordon Oliver and Elsa Lanchester appear in supporting roles. It was adapted for the screen by Mel Dinelli from the novel Some Must Watch (1933) by Ethel Lina White.

The project originated with producer David O. Selznick, who purchased the rights to White's novel, intending to cast Ingrid Bergman in the lead role. Selznick subsequently sold the rights to RKO Radio Pictures, who commenced production and cast McGuire in the lead. Filming took place at the RKO Radio Pictures studio lot in Los Angeles between August and October 1945.

The Spiral Staircase premiered in New York City on February 6, 1946 and went on to become a box-office success, earning nearly $3 million. It was met by favorable critical reviews, praised for its cinematography, atmosphere, and suspense. Barrymore earned an Academy Award nomination for Best Supporting Actress for her performance in the film. In the years since its release, film scholars have noted The Spiral Staircase for its stylistic mixture of horror and film noir elements.

== Plot ==
In a village in 1916 Vermont, Helen, a mute girl, attends a silent film screening in a local inn. During the screening, a lame woman limps out of the theatre to her room. She is strangled by a man who was hiding in her closet. Her murder is the third in a string of killings in the community.

Dr. Parry, a friend of Helen's, drives her to the Warren home, a large estate outside town where Helen is employed as a live-in companion for the bedridden Mrs. Warren. Also residing in the house are Mrs. Warren's stepson Albert, a local professor; her son, Steven, a charming, rakish playboy; and live-in staff: Mrs. Oates, a housekeeper; her husband Mr. Oates, a handyman; Blanche, Albert's beautiful secretary who is having an affair with Steven, who has recently returned from abroad; and Nurse Barker, who Mrs. Warren verbally abuses.

In the mansion while Helen pauses to see herself in a mirror, the killer is spying on her. Before anything happens to her, someone enters the area.

Helen finds Mrs. Oates, who discusses the murder and expresses fear for Helen, as the killer appears to be targeting women with disabilities. After Mrs. Warren loses consciousness, Dr. Parry is summoned to the home. Nurse Barker discovers that the bottle of ether has gone missing, and Albert sends Mr. Oates to retrieve some in town. Meanwhile, Mrs. Warren regains consciousness and urges Dr. Parry to take Helen with him. He offers to take Helen to Boston and help her work through the trauma of her parents' death, the shock of which triggered her muteness. She agrees to go, and Dr. Parry makes plans to return in the evening.

After an argument with Steven, Blanche asks Helen if she can leave with her that night. She agrees, and Blanche goes down the spiral staircase to the basement to retrieve her suitcase. There Blanche is attacked and strangled by the killer. Helen finds her corpse in the basement and is confronted by Steven. Frightened that he is responsible, she locks him downstairs and flees upstairs. She attempts to wake Mrs. Oates who has passed out, drunk on the professor's stolen brandy. Helen attempts to call Dr. Parry but is unable to speak to the telephone operator.

Albert finds Helen frantic, and she writes on a notepad that Blanche has been murdered. As he follows her up the staircase to Mrs. Warren's room, he confesses to killing her out of jealousy, "Blanche, whom I loved, did not love me." Albert then reveals how he got everyone out of the way to get her alone, and that he has a goal of killing the "weak and imperfect of the world." Albert tells her: "I saw you earlier looking at yourself in the mirror, and you had no mouth." Helen flees, locking herself in Mrs. Warren's bedroom.

Meanwhile, the constable shows up and is answered at the front door by Albert; he leaves a message for Helen letting her know that Dr. Parry is unable to return that night. Helen returns to the basement to free Steven but finds Albert waiting. He chases her, but they are met by Mrs. Warren, armed with a gun. She shoots Albert, killing him, and Helen screams in horror. Mrs. Warren explains that she suspected Albert was the killer, but wasn't sure because the murders stopped when Steven was away. She notes Albert started killing again when Steven returned to cast suspicion on him.

Helen retrieves Steven, who rushes to his mothers side when she breaks down, having used all her strength for shooting Albert. Helen calls Dr. Parry for help on the telephone — and finally, she is now able to fully speak.

== Cast ==
- Dorothy McGuire as Helen
- George Brent as Professor Albert Warren
- Ethel Barrymore as Mrs. Warren
- Kent Smith as Dr. Parry
- Gordon Oliver as Steven Warren
- Rhonda Fleming as Blanche
- Elsa Lanchester as Mrs. Oates
- Sara Allgood as Nurse Barker
- Rhys Williams as Mr. Oates
- James Bell as Constable
- Erville Alderson as Dr. Harvey (uncredited)
- Robert Siodmak as The Killer's 'Eye' (uncredited)
- Carlton the Bulldog as Himself (uncredited)

== Analysis ==
Since its release, The Spiral Staircase has been subject to significant film criticism and academic discussion, particularly in regard to the film's visual motifs and blending of horror and film noir. Although characterized by contemporaneous press as a "mystery romance," the film has been noted by contemporary critics for its prominent Gothic horror elements. It has also been cited as one of numerous progenitors to the slasher film, specifically for its female-centric cast and point-of-view cinematography deployed during scenes in which the killer stalks his victims.

Film scholar Amy Golden notes several significant visual allusions in the film, such as Luis Buñuel's Un chien andalou (1929) and Maya Deren's Meshes of the Afternoon (1943). Golden cites the film as a "quintessential example of 1940s horror." Writer Denis Grunes in 2007 suggested the film is "in fact a masked allegory of the passage of silent cinema into sound," citing the mute protagonist's predicament as evidence. This notion was also suggested by film scholar Amy Lawrence in her 1991 book Echo and Narcissus: Women's Voices in Classical Hollywood Cinema.

== Production ==
=== Development ===
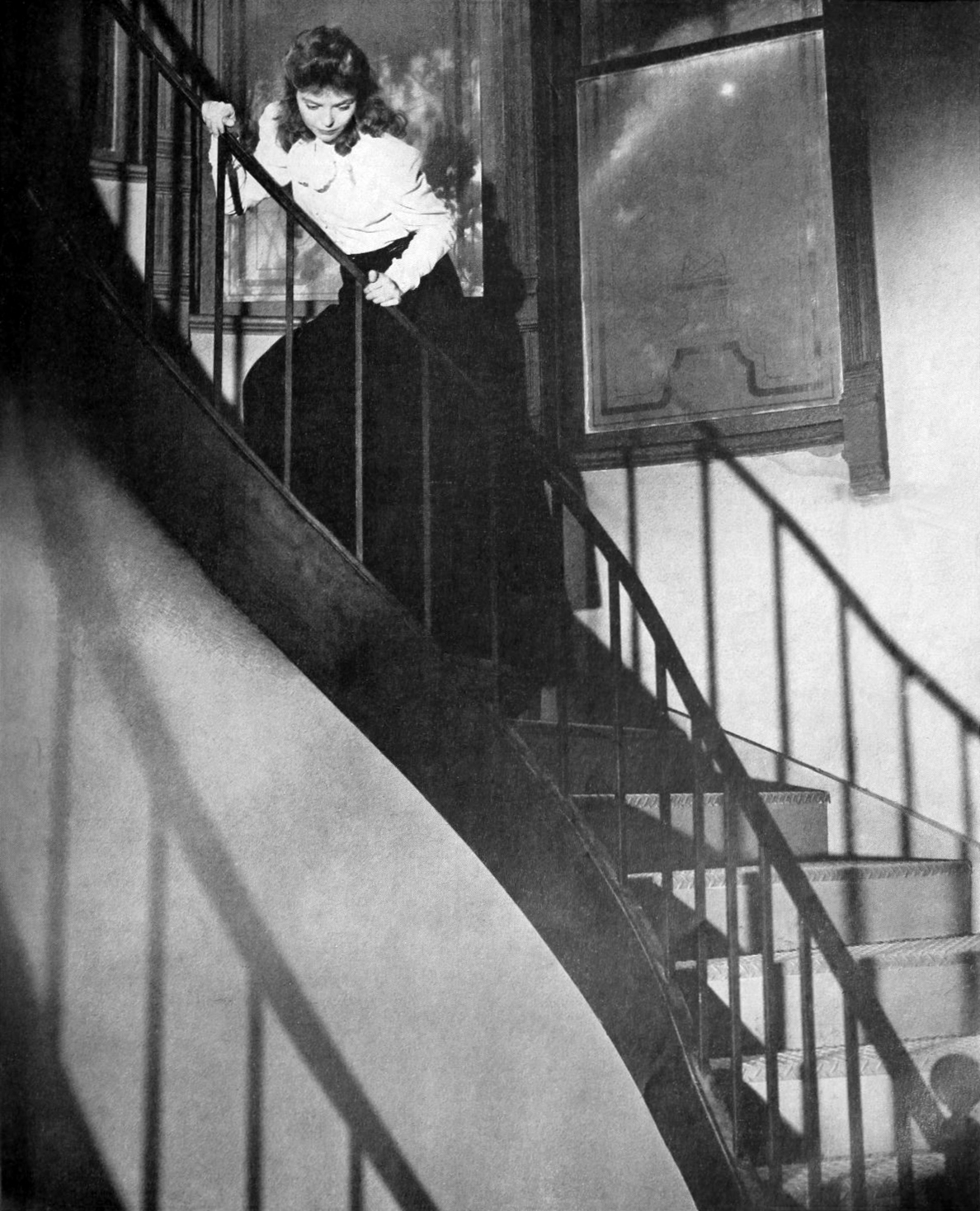
Dorothy McGuire in The Spiral Staircase

Adapted from the Ethel Lina White novel Some Must Watch (1933), The Spiral Staircase was screenwriter Mel Dinelli's first screenplay. RKO Pictures had acquired the rights to produce the film from independent producer David O. Selznick, who himself purchased the rights to White's novel; Selznick had originally conceived a film adaptation with Ingrid Bergman in the lead role. Selznick sold the rights to the project (along with several others he owned) to RKO in order to help finance the Western Duel in the Sun (1946). Under the terms of the sale, Selznick was given a back end cut of the film's earnings, and subsequently gave star Dorothy McGuire a convertible as a bonus for appearing in the film. The screenplay originally bore the same title as White's novel, though a subsequent working title for the project was The Silence of Helen McCord.

When writing the screenplay, Dinelli received input from Dore Schary, who was recommended by Selznick. In the early stages of Dinelli's writing, it was decided to change the setting from England to New England in the United States, which Dinelli and Schary both decided would lend a Gothic tone to the story. The spiral staircase featured in the script (from which the title of the film takes its name) also featured in White's original novel.

=== Filming ===
The film was shot between August and November 1945 on the RKO Studio lot in Los Angeles, California, on a production budget of approximately $750,000. In November 1945, it was publicized that actress McGuire went missing for approximately twenty minutes during filming after unintentionally locking herself in one of several labyrinthine rooms constructed in a studio basement.

Cinematographer Nicholas Musuraca was hired to shoot the film, who had previously shot several low-budget films for Val Lewton at RKO, such as Cat People (1942), The Seventh Victim (1943), and The Curse of the Cat People (1944). Musuraca employed several techniques to achieve the film's chiaroscuro-inspired compositions, which included shooting at low angles to achieve the appearance of deep shadows onscreen. In order to conceal the killer's identity, Musuraca shot director Siodmak's eyes for the close-up shots of the killer watching Helen. On October 10, 1945, toward the end of the shoot, the film's assistant director, Harry Scott, died.

The film featured in the opening sequence at the movie house is D. W. Griffith's The Sands of Dee, which was in reality released in 1912, six years after The Spiral Staircase takes place.

== Release ==
=== Box office ===
The Spiral Staircase premiered in New York City on February 6, 1946. This was followed by a national theatrical run, during which the film screened in various cities across the United States during the late-winter and early-spring months of 1946. (Note: Newspaper sources from various U.S. cities mention the film screening in local cinemas between February and June 1946, including cinemas in Detroit, Michigan; Nashville, Tennessee; Pittsburgh, Pennsylvania; Cincinnati, Ohio; Havre, Montana; and Corvallis, Oregon, among others.) It was later screened in England and Wales in June 1946.

During its theatrical run, the film managed to gross $885,000, with a total of $2.8 million in U.S. rentals, according to Variety. The film was a box-office success, netting a profit of approximately $900,000.

=== Critical reception ===
Variety wrote, "This is a smooth production of an obvious, though suspenseful murder thriller, ably acted and directed. Mood and pace are well set, and story grips throughout." Bosley Crowther of The New York Times wrote, "This is a shocker, plain and simple, and whatever pretensions it has to psychological drama may be considered merely as a concession to a currently popular fancy." During its local theatrical runs, the film earned reviews in various local press: a review in the Pittsburgh Press called the film a "blood-and-thunder melodrama...done so well except that it tends to be tedious at times instead of tense, so leisurely is it paced that it works up considerable suspense." In the Beatrice Daily Sun of Beatrice, Nebraska, it was noted: "An ingenious plot and the work of a superb cast lend distinction to The Spiral Staircase," with the film being ultimately deemed as "gripping." A review published in the Corvallis Gazette-Times of Corvallis, Oregon, summarized:

The Spiral Staircase is one of the season's top mystery dramas... this gripping RKO Radio offering is laid in a New England town about the turn of the century... The suspense mounts as the menace closes in around the helpless heroine, who is unable to escape from the frightening family of her employer. A climax, terrific in its impact, had yesterday's audience breathless and tense.

On the internet review aggregator Rotten Tomatoes, the film holds an approval rating of 87% based on 23 reviews, with a weighted average rating of 8/10. Contemporary author and film critic Leonard Maltin awarded the film three and a half out of a possible four stars, calling it "[a] Superb Hitchock-like thriller with [an] unforgettable performance by McGuire". Pauline Kael praised the film's establishment of characters, noting that it "has all the trappings of the genre...but the psychopaths are quite presentable people, and this, plus the skillful, swift direction, makes the terror convincing."

A review published in the Time Out film guide called the film a "superb thriller," concluding: "Hitchcock couldn't have bettered the casual mastery with which the opening defines not just time and place (small town, turn of the century) but the themes of voyeurism and entrapment." Film scholar Andrew Spicer praised the film's cinematography, calling it "the most beautifully crafted of Siodmak's films, superbly paced with the suspense steadily accumulating in intensity aided by the expressive cinematography of Nicholas Musuraca." Tom Milne of the Time Out Film Guide called the film "one of the undoubted masterpieces of the Gothic mode."

Ethel Barrymore was nominated for Best Supporting Actress at the 19th Academy Awards.

=== Home media ===
The Spiral Staircase was released on VHS and DVD in 2000 by Anchor Bay Entertainment. It was re-released on DVD by Metro-Goldwyn-Mayer in 2005 after the studio and its catalogue were acquired by Sony Pictures. On October 2, 2018, Kino Lorber released DVD and Blu-ray editions in the United States under license from Walt Disney Studios Motion Pictures, which owns this film as part of the David O. Selznick library; Kino Lorber's release features a 4K scan from the original film elements.

== Adaptations ==
The novel was adapted for a radio production starring Helen Hayes before reaching the screen.

The Spiral Staircase was adapted as a half-hour radio play on the November 25, 1949, broadcast of Screen Director's Playhouse, starring Dorothy McGuire in her original role.

In 1961, a televised adaptation starring Elizabeth Montgomery and Lillian Gish was released. It was remade again in 1975 as The Spiral Staircase with Jacqueline Bisset, and again as a 2000 TV film The Spiral Staircase with Nicollette Sheridan.

== Sources ==
- Alpi, Deborah Lazaroff (1998). Robert Siodmak: A Biography, with Critical Analyses of His Films Noirs and a Filmography of All His Works. McFarland. ISBN 978-0-786-40489-6.
- Commire, Anne (2000). Women in World History. Vol. 10. Gale. ISBN 978-0-787-64069-9.
- Golden, Anne (2015). "Robert Siodmak's The Spiral Staircase: Horror Genre Hybridity, Vertical Alterity, and the Avant-Garde". In DeGiglio-Bellemare, Marion; Ellbé, Charlie; Woofter, Kristopher (eds.). Recovering 1940s Horror Cinema: Traces of a Lost Decade. Lanham, Maryland: Lexington Books. pp. 90–107. ISBN 978-1-498-50380-8.
- Hutchings, Peter (2009). The A to Z of Horror Cinema. Lanham, Maryland: Scarecrow Press. ISBN 978-0-810-87050-5.
- Hutchings, Peter (2017). Historical Dictionary of Horror Cinema. Lanham, Maryland: Scarecroew Press. ISBN 978-1-538-10244-2.
- Jewell, Richard; Harbin, Vernon (1985). The RKO Story. New Rochelle, New York: Arlington House. ISBN 978-0-517-54656-7.
- Kabatchnik, Amnon (2010). Blood on the Stage, 1925-1950: Milestone Plays of Crime, Mystery, and Detection: An Annotated Repertoire. Lanham, Maryland: Scarecrow Press. ISBN 978-0-810-86963-9.
- Kael, Pauline (2011) [1982]. 5001 Nights at the Movies. Henry Holt and Company. ISBN 978-1-250-03357-4.
- Lawrence, Amy (1991). Echo and Narcissus: Women's Voices in Classical Hollywood Cinema. Los Angeles: University of California Press. ISBN 978-0-520-07082-0.
- Olney, Ian (2015). "Dead Zone: Genre, Gender, and the "Lost Decade" of Horror Cinema, 1946–1956". In DeGiglio-Bellemare, Marion; Ellbé, Charlie; Woofter, Kristopher (eds.). Recovering 1940s Horror Cinema: Traces of a Lost Decade. Lanham, Maryland: Lexington Books. pp. 47–67. ISBN 978-1-498-50380-8.
- Pitts, Michael R. (2015). RKO Radio Pictures Horror, Science Fiction and Fantasy Films, 1929-1956. Jefferson, North Carolina: McFarland. ISBN 978-0-786-46047-2.
- Spicer, Andrew (2002). Film Noir. Inside Film. London: Longman/Pearson Education. ISBN 978-0-582-43712-8.
- White, Ethel Lina (1941). Some Must Watch. London, England: Harper and Brothers. ISBN 978-1-848-58454-9.
