= Ethel Lina White =

British crime writer (1876–1944)

- Born: 2 April 1876; Abergavenny, Monmouthshire, Wales
- Died: 13 August 1944 (aged 68); London, England
- Occupation: writer
- Known for: The Wheel Spins novel

Ethel Lina White (2 April 1876 – 13 August 1944) was a British crime writer from Abergavenny, Monmouthshire, Wales. She was best known for her novel The Wheel Spins (1936), on which the Alfred Hitchcock 1938 film The Lady Vanishes was based.

== Early years ==
Born in Abergavenny, Monmouthshire, in 1876, Ethel Lina White was the daughter of William White, builder and inventor of the Hygeian Rock Building Composition, and Ethel C White, both of Clifton, Bristol. She was one of nine children. Her father's invention, a compound of bitumen and cement was the first waterproof building material, and used in the construction of the London Underground, which brought wealth to the family.

White grew up in Fairlea Grange, which was built in the 1880s by her father, and started writing as a child and contributing essays and poems to children's papers. She passed the Government Examination (Second Class) in freehand drawing at Newport School of Art in 1890. She later began to write short stories, but it was some years before she wrote books. She was living in Abergavenny in 1911.

== Career as a writer ==
By 1917 White was working in London in the Ministry of Pensions, but in 1919 she resigned for a £10 advance in order to write, later saying it was because she disliked "the lack of fresh air and office life". Her publications made her one of the best known crime writers in Britain and the United States in the 1930s and 1940s.

White's first three works, published between 1927 and 1930, were mainstream novels. Her first crime novel, published in 1931, was Put Out the Light. Although attention to her has faded, in her day she was as well known as writers like Dorothy L. Sayers and Agatha Christie. Her works have enjoyed a revival in recent years with a stage adaptation of The Lady Vanishes touring the UK in 2001, a BBC broadcast of an abridged version on BBC Radio 4, and a BBC TV adaptation in 2013. Many of her out-of-print works have recently reappeared in Amazon Kindle.

== Death ==
Ethel Lina White died of ovarian cancer in London in 1944 aged 68. Her estate was valued at £5,737. Her will read: "I give and bequeath unto [sister] Annis Dora White all that I possess on condition she pays a qualified surgeon to plunge a knife into my heart after death" thought to reflect her lifelong fear of being buried alive, a theme which featured in her novel The First Time He Died, published in 1935.

== Adaptations ==
The first film adaptation of White's work was of The Wheel Spins, renamed The Lady Vanishes. The novel was optioned to be filmed soon after publication in 1936, but shelved until Alfred Hitchcock took it up. Whilst The Lady Vanishes is primarily seen as one of the highlights in Alfred Hitchcock's career, he almost did not make the film, doing so only to fulfil a studio contract with Gainsborough Pictures. In 1979 Elliott Gould did a film version.

The success of The Lady Vanishes brought interest in making more films from her books. In 1945, her novel Midnight House became The Unseen, directed by Lewis Allen. Shortly after came an adaptation of Some Must Watch, one of White's earlier novels. Again the name of the novel was changed and became The Spiral Staircase. It gained a Best Supporting Actress Oscar Nomination for Ethel Barrymore.

== Commemoration ==
In 2021, a blue plaque was to be erected on a building in Frogmore Street, Abergavenny, marking her birthplace. It gained support from the HistoryPoints project and the Abergavenny history society.

== Bibliography ==
- The Wish-Bone (1927)
- Twill Soon Be Dark (1929)
- The Eternal Journey (1930)
- Put Out the Light (1931)
- Fear Stalks the Village (1932)
- Some Must Watch (1933; filmed in 1946 as The Spiral Staircase; remade under the same title in 1975, and again for TV in 2000)
- Wax (1935). Expanded from the short story "Waxworks" qv.
- The First Time He Died (1935)
- The Wheel Spins (1936) (filmed in 1938 by Alfred Hitchcock as The Lady Vanishes; remade in 1979 and again for TV in 2013) (Note: The novel was serialised in six weekly 15 minute parts, read by Brenda Blethyn, from 7 March 2008 on BBC Radio 2.). Expanded from the short story "Passengers" qv.
- The Third Eye (1937)
- The Elephant Never Forgets (1937)
- Step in the Dark (1938)
- While She Sleeps (1940)
- She Faded into Air (1941)
- Midnight House (U.S. title Her Heart in Her Throat, 1942, filmed in 1945 as The Unseen)
- The Man Who Loved Lions (U.S. title The Man Who Was Not There, 1943)
- They See in Darkness (1944)

=== Short stories ===
- Blackout and Other Tales of Suspense (Crippen & Landru, ed. by Tony Medawar and Alex Csurko, 2025)
- "Old Man River". Reprinted, Best Mystery Stories (Faber & Faber, 1930)
- "Green Ginger". The Windsor Magazine, March 1932
- "Rain". The Windsor Magazine, April 1933, issue 460
- "Passengers". Raleigh News & Observer, 15 October 1933. Reprinted, Bodies from the Library. Volume 4 (HarperCollins, ed. Tony Medawar, 2021)
- "An Unlocked Window". The Novel Magazine, April 1934. Reprinted, Murder at the Manor: Country House Mysteries (British Library, ed. Martin Edwards, 2016)
- "Honey". Pearson's Weekly, 7 September 1935
- "Cheese". Reprinted, Capital Crimes (British Library, ed. Martin Edwards)
- "Waxworks". Australian Women's Weekly, 25 May 1935. Reprinted, Silent Nights (British Library, ed. Martin Edwards, 2015)
- "White Cap". Akron Beacon Journal, 31 January 1942. Reprinted, Bodies from the Library. Volume 2 (HarperCollins, ed. Tony Medawar, 2019)

=== Stage plays ===
- The Port of Yesterday (1928)
