= The Spiral Staircase (1975 film) =

- Film Poster
- Directed by: Peter Collinson
- Written by: Mel Dinelli
- Based on: Some Must Watch; 1933 novel by Ethel Lina White
- Produced by: Josef Shaftel
- Starring: Jacqueline Bisset; Christopher Plummer; Sam Wanamaker; Mildred Dunnock; Gayle Hunnicutt; Elaine Stritch; John Phillip Law
- Cinematography: Ken Hodges
- Edited by: Raymond Poulton
- Music by: David Lindup
- Production company: Raven Films
- Distributed by: Warner Bros.
- Release date: 1975
- Running time: 86 minutes
- Country: United Kingdom
- Language: English

The Spiral Staircase is a 1975 British horror mystery thriller film directed by Peter Collinson and starring Jacqueline Bisset and Christopher Plummer. It was written by Mel Dinelli and is a remake of the 1946 film of the same name, which was adapted from Ethel Lina White's 1933 novel Some Must Watch.

== Plot ==
A serial killer is terrorizing a community, in which he has stalked and killed five young women, each with a physical disability. The criminal investigation is headed by Lieutenant Fields. Helen Mallory, a beautiful young woman, has been unable to speak a word since she saw her husband and daughter die in a house fire. Her medical examiner Dr. Rawley advises Helen to stay with Mrs. Sherman, her elderly, invalid grandmother, to avoid becoming a potential sixth victim.

At the family mansion, Helen meets her uncle, Joe Sherman, a respected psychiatrist. Blanche, a glamorous Southern belle, is Joe's secretary and lover, and is also romantically involved with his younger brother Steven. Meanwhile, in a nightly rainstorm, Lieutenant Fields and another policeman locate a mysterious man lurking the premises of the mansion. When the man tries to escape, he is shot by Fields. However, it turns out the man is not the real assailant. Unbeknownst to Helen, the real serial killer is spying on her.

Joe instructs Oates, a handyman, to repair the generator in case the electricity goes out inside the mansion. Late in the night, Mrs. Sherman nearly falls into a diabetic coma and is treated with insulin by Nurse Baker. Dr. Rawley arrives to check with Mrs. Sherman, who herself fears Helen is unsafe at the mansion. Dr. Rawley reassures Mrs. Sherman of Helen's safety and leaves. Oates consoles Helen and when he steps outside the mansion, he is strangled to death near the gate.

At the dinner table, Steven reveals he and Blanche will take a vacation in Tobago in the Caribbean. This infuriates Blanche as she declined to have him join her. Joe leaves the dinner table, disappointed, and later inspects the generator down in the cellar. Blanche tells Joe the truth, and is later strangled by the killer. Elsewhere in the mansion, Helen learns Oates and Blanche have both been murdered.

After Steven disposes of Oates's body, he walks down the spiral staircase to the cellar. Helen locks Steven there, fearing he is the real killer. She rushes upstairs and writes a note informing Joe of their deaths. As it turns out, Joe was the real killer and proceeds to murder Helen, as Steven remains locked. However, Lieutenant Fields arrives with the insulin needed for Mrs. Sherman and leaves. Dr. Rawley phones the mansion, and tells Joe he will arrive in the morning to pick up Helen.

Helen runs into the rainstorm to escape from Joe. She returns to the cellar to help free Steven, but when Joe has her cornered, he begins to strangle her. Suddenly, Joe is shot twice from behind by his own mother and he dies. Steven frees himself and rushes to his mother's aid. Helen phones Dr. Rawley and with her voice restored, she says: "It's...it's Helen."

== Cast ==
- Jacqueline Bisset as Helen Mallory
- Christopher Plummer as Dr. Joe Sherman
- John Phillip Law as Steven Sherman
- Sam Wanamaker as Lieutenant Fields
- Mildred Dunnock as Mrs. Sherman
- Gayle Hunnicutt as Blanche
- Elaine Stritch as Nurse Baker
- John Ronane as Dr. Rawley
- Sheila Brennan as Mrs. Oates
- Ronald Radd as Oates
- Heather Lowe as Heather
- Christopher Malcolm as policeman

== Reception ==
The Monthly Film Bulletin wrote: "The 1975 Spiral Staircase, with its plot and characters spruced up for no discernible reason, isn't quite the full-blown shocker one expected – partly due, no doubt, to the restrictions under which the film was made. A budget of £300,000 and a twenty-five-day shooting schedule allow little time for bizarre camera set-ups destined to produce vertigo or a squint, or for the material to be edited in a feverishly staccato tempo. Instead, Collinson generates the correct atmosphere with a large supply of driving rain and thunderclaps, and with many lingering looks on the various features of the 'Sherman Institute' – a luxurious country house replete with carpeted corridors, marble busts, gloomy portraits, large doors and shutters. The only item it seems to lack is a spiral staircase, unless one counts the cramped run of iron steps leading down to the generating room."

Leslie Halliwell wrote: "Modernised remake of the [1945 film] using virtually the same script, and apparently determined to prove how badly it can be presented."

Time Out wrote: "Any interest soon gets lost in the rambling rooms of the huge house that serves as the base for the plot. The moral of the tale would seem to be that if you want your voice back, have someone try to strangle you. Whatever happened to the chilling Gothic tale made by Robert Siodmak in 1946?"

== Sources ==
- Kabatchnik, Amnon (2010). "The Man (1956)". Blood on the Stage, 1950-1975: Milestone Plays of Crime, Mystery, and Detection. Scarecrow Press. ISBN 9780810869639.
