= Harry Horner =

American art director (1910–1994)

- Horner in 1975
- Born: June 24, 1910; Holice, Kingdom of Bohemia, Austria-Hungary
- Died: December 5, 1994 (aged 84); Pacific Palisades, California, U.S.
- Occupation: Art director
- Spouses: Betty Pfaelzer (m. 1938; died 1951) Joan Ruth Fraenkel (m. 1952)
- Children: 3, including James

Harry Horner (July 24, 1910 – December 5, 1994) was a Czech-born American art director who made a successful career in Hollywood as an Oscar-winning art director and as a feature film and television director. He was the father of Academy Award-winning film composer James Horner.

== Biography ==
Horner was born in the town of Holice, Bohemia, Austria-Hungary (in what is now the Czech Republic).

He began his career working with Max Reinhardt in Vienna. When Reinhardt moved to the United States in the early 1930s, Horner travelled with Max Reinhardt's production group acting as his stage manager. Max Reinhardt's staging of Shakespeare's A Midsummer Night's Dream (1934) for the summer Hollywood Bowl season in Los Angeles, Harry Horner was the production's stage manager and also an actor in the production. Following Max Reinhardt to New York, Harry Horner assisted Reinhardt in his staging of the Biblical musical spectacle The Eternal Road (Der Weg der Verheissung); the production had music by Kurt Weill; conducted by Harry Horner; opening at the Manhattan Opera House 1/7/1937-5/15/1937 with scenic design, costume design and lighting by Norman Bel Geddes. Max Reinhardt, disgusted with Norman Bel Geddes lack of interest by not showing up for production rehearsals, pressed Harry Horner into acting as art director supervising the sets, costumes, and the lighting. Because Horner had been faithful to Reinhardt as his stage manager, Reinhardt knew that he could depend upon Horner's many faceted talents and abilities. Consequently, Harry Horner fell into the scenic design craft and was employed as a stage designer. Harry Horner designed the scenery for the drama Lady In The Dark, a drama with a musical dream sequence (music: Kurt Weill); opening January 23, 1941 – June 15, 1941 (reopening 10/2/41-5/30/42, revived 2/27/43-5/15/43). Harry Horner's stage design legacy is the first use of a center stage donut turntable ring, inner and outer turntable rings moving simultaneously and in reverse of each other. The innovative stage design for Lady In The Dark was the first turntable usage on a Broadway stage. During World War II, he served as production designer and set designer for the U.S. Army Air Forces show Winged Victory.

He won an Oscar in 1949 for his work on William Wyler's The Heiress and another in 1961 for Robert Rossen's drama The Hustler. Gene Callahan was The Hustler film's set decorator. When Gene Callahan was nominated in the Oscar Art Direction category for Elia Kazan's America, America, Harry Horner drew the set sketch for Gene, which was used in the telecast's program Art Direction category.

One of his first notable successes was George Cukor's A Double Life (1947) and he soon found himself up on the Oscar podium in 1949 for his work on William Wyler's The Heiress. He worked with Cukor again in 1950 on Born Yesterday and then tried his hand at directing on several TV series, including Gunsmoke.

He was nominated for a third time in 1969 for Sydney Pollack's 30s drama They Shoot Horses, Don't They?. Horner directed a few films beginning with Red Planet Mars and Beware, My Lovely both in 1952.

He retired after completing the Neil Diamond remake of The Jazz Singer in 1980. He died of pneumonia in 1994 in Pacific Palisades, California, aged 84.

== Family ==
Married to Betty Pfaelzer in 1938; she died in 1951. In 1952 he married Joan Ruth Fraenkel, who was his wife until his death. They had three sons. His eldest son was the Oscar-winning composer James Horner.

== Filmography ==
As director

- Red Planet Mars (1952)
- Beware, My Lovely (1952)
- Vicki (1953)
- New Faces (1954)
- A Life in the Balance (1955)
- Man from Del Rio (1956)
- The Wild Party (1956)

== Legacy ==
Horner's papers are preserved at the UCLA Charles E. Young Research Library Special Collections and Archives.

== Interview ==
- Harry Horner: "Das Herz rutschte mir in die Hose, als ich nach Ellis Island gebracht wurde" ("My heart was in my mouth as I was brought to Ellis Island"). In: Christian Cargnelli, Michael Omasta (eds.): Aufbruch ins Ungewisse. Österreichische Filmschaffende in der Emigration vor 1945. Vienna, Wespennest: 1993

== See also ==
- Art Directors Guild Hall of Fame
- List of German-speaking Academy Award winners and nominees
