= The Unseen (1945 film) =

1945 film by Lewis Allen

- Theatrical release poster
- Directed by: Lewis Allen
- Written by: Adaptation: Hagar Wilde; Ken Englund
- Screenplay by: Hagar Wilde; Raymond Chandler
- Based on: the novel Her Heart in Her Throat by Ethel Lina White
- Produced by: John Houseman
- Starring: Joel McCrea; Gail Russell; Herbert Marshall
- Narrated by: Ray Collins
- Cinematography: John F. Seitz
- Edited by: Doane Harrison
- Music by: Ernst Toch
- Color process: Black and white
- Production company: Paramount Pictures
- Distributed by: Paramount Pictures
- Release dates: May 12, 1945 (New York City); June 7, 1945 (Los Angeles)
- Running time: 80 minutes
- Country: United States
- Language: English

The Unseen is a 1945 American horror mystery film directed by Lewis Allen and starring Joel McCrea. It's based on the 1942 novel Midnight House (US title: Her Heart in Her Throat) by Ethel Lina White.

The film was Paramount's follow-up vehicle to The Uninvited (1944), in which star Gail Russell surged to popularity.

Raymond Chandler was one of the writers of the script.

== Plot ==
An old homeless woman is murdered after seeing a light through the basement window of abandoned 11 Crescent Drive. Young Barney Fielding witnesses this from his window next door at number 10.

Elizabeth Howard (Gail Russell), arrives at the house to be governess to Barney and his sister, Ellen, but is met with aggression from the boy who is unusually attached to their former governess, Maxine, and tells her: "You're my enemy! I hate you!" Elizabeth's room overlooks the garden of the eerie house next door, and she finds a watch that belonged to the murdered old woman in her dressing table.

Over the next few weeks, Marian Tygarth (Isobel Elsom), a widow who owns shuttered-up 11 Crescent Drive, returns to put the house up for sale. Elizabeth suspects someone is gaining access to the cellars and confides in David Fielding (Joel McCrea), the children's father, but he dismisses her concerns. She turns to Dr. Evans (Herbert Marshall), a neighbor and friend of the family, who advises her not to call the police as David would not like it (unknown to Ellen, David was once suspected of murdering his wife). Ellen tells Elizabeth that Barney is the one who lets the lurking man into the house at night, on Maxine's orders. The next day, the employment agency tells Elizabeth they cannot send anyone over that day. However, a new maid arrives at the house, and Elizabeth eventually realizes she is Maxine (Phyllis Brooks); David tries to throw Maxine out of the house. Shortly after, she is found murdered outside the empty house. David is nowhere to be found, which causes the police to consider him the prime suspect. After the police leave, Mrs. Tygarth comes over to keep Elizabeth company after the children have gone to bed.

Mrs. Tygarth tells Elizabeth that the man who murdered her husband is next door as they speak. She says that she is being forced to help the mysterious man, who has been visiting there every night, to clean the bloody crime scene from 12 years before. She knows she is his next victim and tells Elizabeth she is going to call the police, but actually goes next door to kill the still unknown man; he kills her instead. Elizabeth still suspects the perpetrator might be David, and calls on Dr. Evans for help. David arrives and accuses Dr. Evans, who is revealed to be the killer, which he became when he once thought that he could have Mrs. Tygarth for himself.

== Cast ==
- Joel McCrea as David Fielding
- Gail Russell as Elizabeth Howard
- Herbert Marshall as Dr. Charles Evans
- Phyllis Brooks as Maxine
- Isobel Elsom as Marian Tygarth
- Norman Lloyd as Jasper Goodwin
- Mikhail Rasumny as Chester
- Elisabeth Risdon as Mrs. Norris
- Tom Tully as Sullivan
- Nona Griffith as Ellen Fielding
- Richard Lyon as Barnaby Fielding

== Production ==
The original title was Her Heart was in Her Throat. Lewis Allen later recalled "Chandler was writing the script and John Houseman was always interfering, wanting to change this and change that. I was on Ray Chandler's side; I said to Houseman, “Look, John, Ray’s a very good writer. Let’s trust him.” " This led to a story that Allen and Houseman clashed but Allen insisted, "I never quarreled with Houseman."

== Awards and nominations ==
The Unseen was nominated for Best Sound Recording at the 1946 Oscars.
