= Put Out the Light =

1931 novel

- First edition
- Author: Ethel Lina White
- Language: English
- Genre: Mystery
- Publisher: Ward Lock & Co
- Publication date: 1931
- Publication place: United Kingdom

Put Out The Light is a 1931 mystery novel by writer Ethel Lina White. It has also been printed under the title "Sinister Light".

== Background ==
Ethel Lina White was a renowned mystery writer in both Britain and the United States in the 1930s and 40s. Put Out The Light, her fourth novel, was her first published mystery novel.

== Plot ==
Anthea Vine is a vain, controlling spinster. She gives an illusion of youth and charm. She lives in a solitary house, Jamaica Court, on a hill, keeping her fellow five inmates financially imprisoned. She interferes in their love affairs and keeps their lives under complete control. However, someone is out to get Miss Vine, and Jamaica Court suddenly becomes her own prison.

== Publication history ==
Put Out the Light was first published in England by Ward Lock & Co, who published several of White's early works before she became affiliated with Collins Crime Club. As with most of White's books, it fell out of print after her death in 1944 until the 1960s, when re-interest in gothic fiction skyrocketed and it was retitled Sinister Light. It has been made widely available on Amazon Kindle, along with many of White's other works.
