= Step in the Dark =

1938 novel

- Author: Ethel Lina White
- Language: English
- Genre: Mystery
- Publisher: Collins Crime Club (UK); Harper Brothers (US)
- Publication date: 1938
- Publication place: United Kingdom
- Media type: Print

Step in the Dark is a mystery thriller novel by the British writer Ethel Lina White, which was first published in 1938. It was published by the Collins Crime Club in London and Harper Brothers in New York.

== Synopsis ==
Since her husband died heavily in debt, his young widow Georgia Yeo has lived on the Suffolk coast writing popular thriller novels to support her two young daughters. Overworked, she is persuaded by her publisher to take a holiday in Belgium. In Brussels she is swept off her feet by Gustav, a Swedish Count. Deeply in love she takes a step in the dark to marry this unknown stranger, accompanying him to the island he owns off the Swedish coast. Very soon she finds herself held a virtual prisoner by the Count and his associates, and tries to slip messages to her publisher and friends in England through the new novel she is writing.

== Bibliography ==
- Peacock, Scott. Contemporary Authors, Volume 167. Gale, 1998.
- Reilly, John M. Twentieth Century Crime & Mystery Writers. Springer, 2015.
