= Fear Stalks the Village =

1932 novel

- Author: Ethel Lina White
- Language: English
- Genre: Mystery
- Publisher: Ward, Lock & Co.
- Publication date: 1932
- Publication place: United Kingdom
- Media type: Print

Fear Stalks the Village is a 1932 mystery novel by the British writer Ethel Lina White. It was her second novel in the genre, and was published by Ward, Lock & Co. It was later published in the United States by Harper Brothers due to the author's growing reputation.

== Synopsis ==
In an seemingly idyllic English village, the peace is shattered by a series of poison pen letters dredging up long-buried secrets about the various leading inhabitants. This soon has deadly consequences, and Joan Brook working as a paid companion for Lady D'Arcy finds herself in the middle of it.

== Bibliography ==
- Bourgeau, Art. The Mystery Lover's Companion. Crown, 1986.
- Reilly, John M. Twentieth Century Crime & Mystery Writers. Springer, 2015.
