= Dangerous Curves (1988 film) =

1988 film by David Lewis

- Film Poster
- Directed by: David Lewis
- Written by: Michael Dugan; Michael Zand; Paul Brown
- Produced by: Mark Borde; Kenneth Raich
- Starring: Tate Donovan and Grant Heslov
- Music by: John D'Andrea
- Production company: Vestron Pictures
- Release date: 1988
- Running time: 93 minutes
- Country: United States
- Language: English

Dangerous Curves is a 1988 American comedy film directed by David Lewis and starring Tate Donovan and Grant Heslov.

The movie also featured brief appearances by Debbe Dunning and Cynthia Geary, early in their respective careers. Both actresses were cast as participants in a bikini contest.

== Plot ==
Chuck (Tate Donovan), an uptight college student in Los Angeles, is hired by a successful businessman to deliver a Porsche to his daughter in Lake Tahoe, with the promise of a job if the delivery is successful. His fun-loving, girl-obsessed friend and roommate, Wally (Grant Heslov) convinces Chuck to drive him to San Diego first. The Porsche is stolen, and Chuck decides to try to get it back with Wally's help but without involving the police so that the businessman does not find out. Meanwhile, Blake (Valerie Breiman), a fun-loving Texan, has convinced her naive friend Michelle (Danielle von Zerneck) to participate in a beauty pageant. The car thief is a successful local businessman, Greg Krevske (Leslie Nielsen), who pledges the stolen Porsche as part of the grand prize in the contest; Chuck and Wally meet Blake and Michelle, who are initially skeptical of the boys' story. Rival pageant contestant Shawn (Karen Lynn Scott) has a controlling stage mother who tricks Blake and Michelle into going to a party on Krevske's boat to try to get them out of the way for the next round of the pageant so that they will be disqualified. Chuck and Wally sneak onto the boat in order to get evidence of the theft. Chuck finds a briefcase full of incriminating evidence, including the Porsche's original license plate. The four flee on WetBikes, steal Krevske's Ferrari, and agree to work together to steal back the Porsche. Chuck and Michelle spend the night together on a catamaran on the beach. The next day, with Michelle's help, Chuck and Wally steal back the Porsche. They present Krevske's Ferrari to the pageant as a replacement grand prize, and give the police the incriminating evidence from Krevske's boat. Wally suggests leaving in order to make it to Lake Tahoe on time, but Chuck refuses to leave without talking to Michelle again. Shawn wins the beauty pageant, Blake invites Wally to stay in San Diego with her to have fun, and Chuck and Michelle get ready to drive to Lake Tahoe.

== Cast ==
- Tate Donovan as Chuck Upton
- Danielle von Zerneck as Michelle West
- Grant Heslov as Wally Wilder
- Valerie Breiman as Blake
- Robert Stack as Louis Faciano
- Leslie Nielsen as Greg Krevske
- Karen Lynn Scott as Shawn
- Michael Rosenberg as Jackie Diamond
- Elizabeth Ashley as Miss Reed
- Robert Romanus as Hector
- Eva LaRue as Leslie Cruz
- Martha Quinn as Tympani Charles
- Robert Klein as Bam Bam
