= While She Sleeps (novel) =

1940 novel

- American first edition
- Author: Ethel Lina White
- Language: English
- Genre: Mystery Thriller
- Publisher: Collins Crime Club (UK); Harper Brothers (US)
- Publication date: 1940
- Publication place: United Kingdom
- Media type: Print

While She Sleeps is a 1940 mystery thriller novel by the British writer Ethel Lina White. White was an established author of mysteries and thrillers by this stage, and the novel was published by the Collins Crime Club and Harper Brothers.

== Synopsis ==
A young woman considers herself to be naturally lucky. After winning the Irish Sweepstake she has acquired three houses - one in the city, one in the country, and one at the seaside. Bored of life in England, she lets her London house and goes for a long-planned holiday in Switzerland unaware that she is now a target for murder.

== Bibliography ==
- Adams, Margaret. Single Blessedness: Observations on the Single Status in Married Society. Penguin Books, 1978.
- Bourgeau, Art. The Mystery Lover's Companion. Crown, 1986.
- Reilly, John M. Twentieth Century Crime & Mystery Writers. Springer, 2015.
