= Debbe Dunning =

American actress (born 1966)

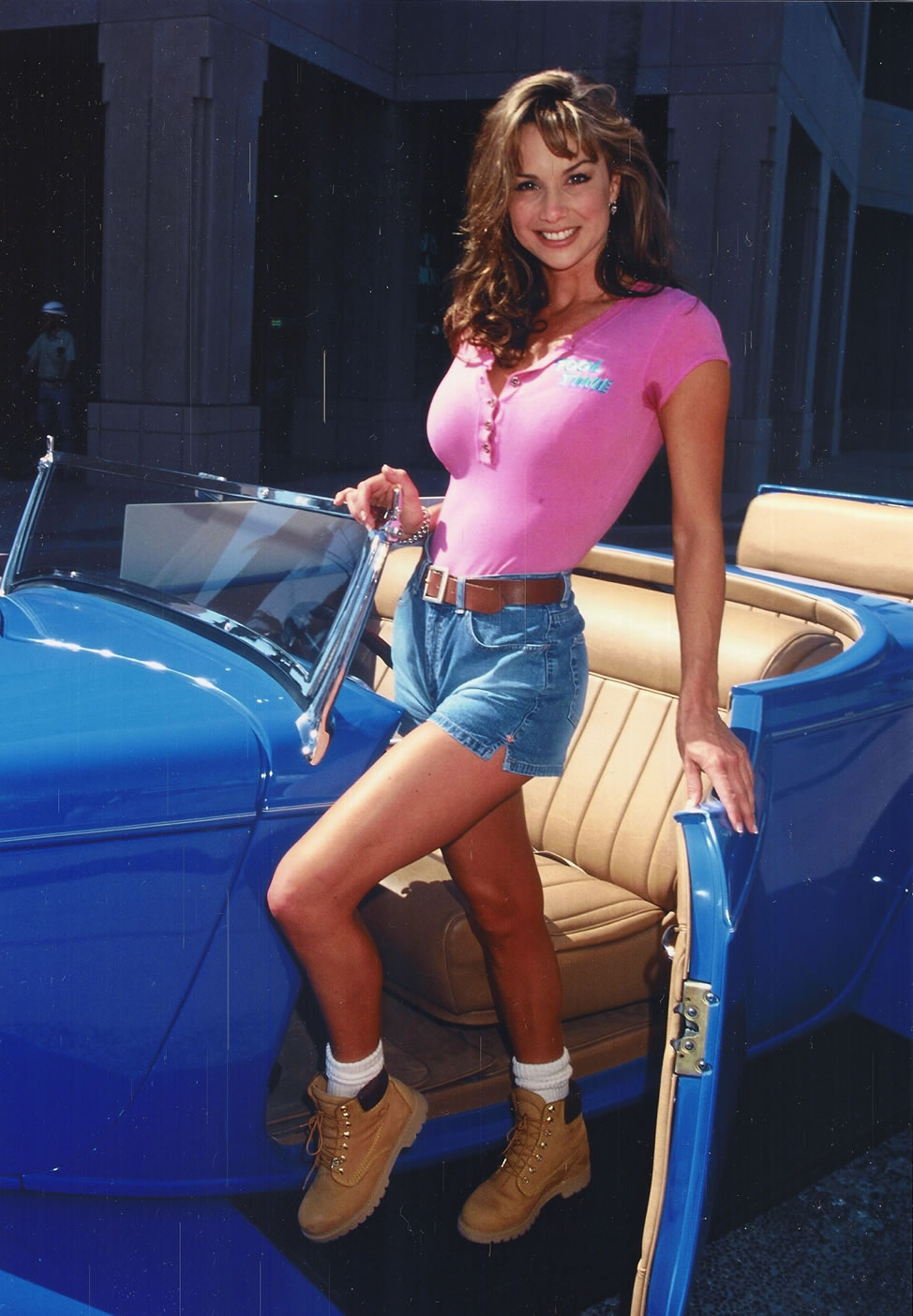
- Dunning during Home Improvement
- Born: Debra L. Dunning; July 11, 1966 (age 60); Burbank, California, U.S.
- Occupations: Actress, model, spokesperson, comedian, producer, host
- Years active: 1988–2006, 2025–present
- Spouse: Steve Timmons (m. 1997; div. 2018)
- Children: 3

Debra L. "Debbe" Dunning (born July 11, 1966) is an American actress, model, television host, spokesperson, and comedienne. She is best known for playing Heidi Keppert on Home Improvement (1993–1999).

== Career ==
Dunning played Heidi Keppert, the Tool Time girl, on the ABC sitcom Home Improvement from seasons three to eight, having guest-starred in an earlier season.

She appeared in Dangerous Curves (1988) and the American Gladiators Celebrity Challenge (1989).

== Personal life ==
From May 11, 1997 until May 19, 2018, Dunning was married to American volleyball player Steve Timmons, with whom she has three children.

== Filmography ==
| Year | Title | Role | Notes |
|---|---|---|---|
| 1988 | Dangerous Curves | Pageant Girl | credited as Debra Dunning |
| 1990–1991 | Married... with Children | Rochelle | credited as Debbie Dunning |
| 1993–1999 | Home Improvement | Heidi Keppert (Note: Prior to being cast as Heidi, Dunning appeared on a season 2 episode of Home Improvement as Kiki Von Fursterwallenscheinlaw.) | Main role |
| 1994 | Tales from the Crypt | | Episode: "The Pit" |
| 1994 | Renegade | | Episode: "Hostage" |
| 1995 | Off Camera with Dean Cain | Herself | |
| 1995 | The Misery Brothers | Ima Barrister | |
| 1995 | Spring Break Blast | Unknown | |
| 1996 | Boy Meets World | Alexandra | Episode: “The Happiest Show On Earth” |
| 1996 | Silk Stalkings | Amanda Burke | Episode: "Body Electric" |
| 1996 | Leprechaun 4: In Space | Private Delores Costello | |
| 1999 | The Jamie Foxx Show | Herself | |
| 2000 | The Spiral Staircase | Danielle | |
| 2002 | Now You Know | Sun Goddess | |
| 2002 | Sabrina the Teenage Witch | Veronique | Episode: "I, Busybody" |
| 2003 | Tim Allen Presents: A User's Guide to 'Home Improvement' | Herself / Heidi / Kiki | |
| 2003 | Four Fingers of the Dragon | Herself | |
| 2005 | The E! True Hollywood Story/Home Improvement | Herself | |
| 2006 | Wicked Wicked Games | Hope Lorca | |
| 2006 | The Last Guy on Earth | | |
| 2025 | Shifting Gears | April | Episode: "Secret" |
