= Mel Dinelli =

American screenwriter (1912–1991)

Amelio "Mel" Dinelli (6 October 1912, Albuquerque, New Mexico – 28 November 1991, Los Angeles, California) was an American writer for theatre, radio, film and magazines, usually in the suspense genre. He grew up in Albuquerque, New Mexico, and graduated from Albuquerque High School. He joined the Albuquerque Little Theatre company for its inaugural season in 1931, acting in two plays alongside future I Love Lucy star Vivian Vance. He later studied at the Pasadena Playhouse school of theater arts and the University of Washington.

One of his earliest plays was Shubert Alley, about a young woman's rise to fame on Broadway, which was notable at the time for its all-female cast. The play was published in 1943 and had reportedly been performed in 385 cities by 1945. Later in the 1940s he wrote for the CBS radio drama series Suspense, including the 1945 episode "To Find Help" which starred Frank Sinatra in one of his first dramatic roles. Dinelli later adapted the story into a play, The Man, which debuted on Broadway in 1950, and a film, Beware, My Lovely. He wrote a number of other Hollywood screenplays including The Spiral Staircase, The Window, and Fritz Lang's House by the River.

== Selected credits ==
=== Screenplays ===
- The Spiral Staircase (1946)
- The Window (1949)
- The Reckless Moment (1949)
- House by the River (1950)
- Cause for Alarm! (1951)
- Beware, My Lovely (1952) – also based on his play and story, The Man
- Jeopardy (1953)
- Lizzie (1957)
- Step Down to Terror (1958)

=== Plays ===
- Shubert Alley (1943)
- The Man (1950) – original production starred Dorothy Gish – based on his short story
