= Midnight House =

1942 novel

- First edition
- Author: Ethel Lina White
- Language: English
- Genre: Mystery
- Publisher: Collins Crime Club (UK); Harper Brothers (US)
- Publication date: 1942
- Publication place: United Kingdom
- Media type: Print

Midnight House is a mystery thriller novel by the British writer Ethel Lina White, which was first published in 1942. It was published in America by Harper under the alternative title Her Heart in Her Throat.

== Synopsis ==
In a small English town, Elizabeth is employed as the governess of two small children of the widowed Captain Pewter. The house is located in an isolated Victorian era crescent of houses. The house next door has been shut up for many years where a tragic illicit romance once took place. To Elizabeth's alarm the Captain's son Barney appears to still be under the influence of his former governess Maxine who had been dismissed by the Captain. In addition an apparently deranged man is killing woman in the streets. Elizabeth becomes convinced that there is a connection between the killings, Maxine and the old empty house next door.

== Film adaptation ==
In 1945 it was adapted into a Hollywood film The Unseen directed by Lewis Allen and starring Joel McCrea, Gail Russell and Herbert Marshall. The film shifted the setting from England to the United States.

== Bibliography ==
- Goble, Alan. The Complete Index to Literary Sources in Film. Walter de Gruyter, 1999.
- Reilly, John M. Twentieth Century Crime & Mystery Writers. Springer, 2015.
