= The Lady Vanishes (2013 film) =

British mystery movie

- Promotional poster
- Genre: Drama
- Based on: The Wheel Spins by Ethel Lina White
- Screenplay by: Fiona Seres
- Directed by: Diarmuid Lawrence
- Starring: Tuppence Middleton; Selina Cadell; Keeley Hawes; Tom Hughes; Julian Rhind-Tutt; Stephanie Cole; Gemma Jones
- Theme music composer: John Lunn
- Country of origin: United Kingdom
- Original language: English

Production
- Producer: Ann Tricklebank
- Cinematography: Peter Greenhalgh
- Editor: David Head
- Running time: 87 minutes
- Production company: BBC

Original release
- Network: BBC One
- Release: 17 March 2013

The Lady Vanishes is a 2013 British television mystery thriller film directed by Diarmuid Lawrence, and a co-production of the BBC and Masterpiece Films. It is based on the 1936 novel The Wheel Spins by Ethel Lina White. It stars Selina Cadell in the role of the disappearing Miss Froy, Tuppence Middleton as the young Iris Carr (who discovers the disappearance but is not taken seriously), Tom Hughes and Alex Jennings as Max Hare and the Professor, the two fellow English passengers who come to her aid. It was watched by 7.44 million when it was broadcast on Sunday 17 March 2013 on BBC One.

== Summary ==
The film is less a remake of Alfred Hitchcock's 1938 film of the same name than a new interpretation of the novel, one based far more closely on it. It depicts a young English socialite, Iris Carr, travelling by train across 1930s Europe, returning to England from Croatia. She is alarmed by the mysterious disappearance of an English governess, Miss Froy, also travelling on the train. She enlists the help (initially given somewhat reluctantly) of the handsome young Max Hare, and his former Oxford Professor, who are travelling together on the train, for reasons unstated. As in the book (but unlike the 1938 version of the film), Miss Froy is merely what she appears, and not a British agent of MI6. The motive for her kidnap is not her secret intelligence service operations, but the fact that she witnessed a suspected murderer under circumstances that would have invalidated his alibi for the murder.

== Cast ==
- Tuppence Middleton as Iris Carr
- Tom Hughes as Max Hare
- Selina Cadell as Miss Froy
- Keeley Hawes as Laura Parmiter
- Julian Rhind-Tutt as Mr Todhunter
- Stephanie Cole as Evelyn Floodporter
- Gemma Jones as Rose Floodporter
- Sandy McDade as Mrs Barnes
- Pip Torrens as Reverend Kenneth Barnes
- Alex Jennings as the Professor
- Jesper Christensen as the Doctor
- Benedikte Hansen as the Baroness
- Emerald Fennell as Odette

== Production ==
The setting of the remake is the luxury express passenger train from Croatia to Trieste, rather than in the original fictional country. An entire 1930s luxury passenger train interior, complete with sleeping carriages, a dining car, and a passenger bar and lounge car, were all recreated, to scale, in Budapest for the production of the film. Diarmuid Lawrence, the director, makes an appearance, just as Hitchcock did.
