= The Lady Vanishes (1979 film) =

1979 film by Anthony Page

- UK film poster
- Directed by: Anthony Page
- Screenplay by: George Axelrod
- Based on: The Lady Vanishes 1938 film by Sidney Gilliat Frank Launder; The Wheel Spins 1936 novel by Ethel Lina White
- Produced by: Tom Sachs
- Starring: Elliott Gould; Cybill Shepherd; Angela Lansbury; Herbert Lom; Arthur Lowe; Ian Carmichael
- Cinematography: Douglas Slocombe
- Edited by: Russell Lloyd
- Music by: Richard Hartley
- Production company: Hammer Film Productions
- Distributed by: The Rank Organisation (UK); Group One (US)
- Release date: 9 May 1979
- Running time: 97 minutes
- Country: United Kingdom
- Language: English
- Budget: £2-2.5 million
- Box office: £49,121 (UK)

The Lady Vanishes is a 1979 British mystery comedy film directed by Anthony Page and written by George Axelrod, based on the screenplay of 1938's The Lady Vanishes by Sidney Gilliat and Frank Launder, in turn based on Ethel Lina White's 1936 novel The Wheel Spins. The film stars Elliott Gould, Cybill Shepherd, Angela Lansbury, Herbert Lom, Arthur Lowe and Ian Carmichael.

A remake of Alfred Hitchcock's 1938 film of the same name, the plot follows two Americans travelling by train across 1939 Germany. Together, they investigate the mysterious disappearance of an English nanny also travelling on the train. The remake's setting is essentially similar to Hitchcock's, but is openly set in pre-Second World War Germany rather than in the original fictional country. The Austrian fountain of Oberdrauburg by Hellmuth Marx is part of the setting. In addition, both leads have their nationality changed from British to American.

The film was the last production by Hammer Films for 29 years, until Beyond the Rave (2008).

== Plot ==
In August 1939, a motley group of travellers find themselves in a small hotel in Bavaria, awaiting a delayed train to Switzerland. They include a "much-married madcap American heiress", Amanda Metcalf-Mdivani-Von Hoffsteader-Kelly, and Robert Condon, a wise-cracking American photographer.

That evening Amanda gets very drunk and is knocked unconscious. The following morning, badly hungover, she finds herself in a train compartment with Miss Froy, an elderly governess, and German Baroness Kisling with her servants. Other travellers include Charters and Caldicot, English gentlemen returning to Britain for a cricket test match, "Todhunter", an English diplomat "larking about" with his mistress, and Dr Egon Hartz.

When Amanda wakes up, Miss Froy has vanished. Her fellow travellers, including the baroness, deny seeing Miss Froy and declare that she never existed. Amanda begins to doubt her own mental condition. She starts to investigate, joined only by a sceptical Condon. The train stops to pick up a badly burnt and heavily bandaged automobile accident victim. Shortly thereafter, a "Miss Froy" apparently re-appears, but it is not her.

The train resumes its journey and Amanda is attacked. Miss Froy's broken glasses are found and Condon now believes Amanda's story. They surmise that Miss Froy was lured to the baggage car and is being held captive — and that the heavily bandaged "accident victim" is in fact now Miss Froy. This proves to be the case and Dr Hartz instructs his wife, dressed as a nun (with high heels), to drug their drinks, but his wife chooses not to do so.

At the next station the train is diverted onto a branch line and only the buffet car and one carriage are left. The train stops and Helmut von Reider, an SS officer (son of Miss Froy's former employer), approaches the train, demanding that Miss Froy be surrendered. The passengers refuse and a gunfight ensues. Miss Froy chooses this moment to confess that she is in fact a courier with a vital coded message (she hums a tune to them) that must be delivered to a senior official in London. She leaves the train and disappears. Condon, Charters and Caldicot contrive to take over the engine and drive the train back to the main line and over the Swiss border. Back in London at the Foreign Office, the duo attempts to remember the tune she sang, then suddenly they hear someone humming the same tune. It is Miss Froy who managed to escape her captors.

== Cast ==
- Elliott Gould – Robert Condon
- Cybill Shepherd – Amanda Kelly
- Angela Lansbury – Miss Froy
- Herbert Lom – Dr Hartz
- Arthur Lowe – Charters
- Ian Carmichael – Caldicott
- Gerald Harper – Mr Todhunter
- Jenny Runacre – 'Mrs' Todhunter
- Jean Anderson – Baroness
- Madlena Nedeva – nun
- Madge Ryan – Rose Flood Porter
- Rosalind Knight – Evelyn Barnes
- Vladek Sheybal – trainmaster
- Wolf Kahler – Helmut
- Barbara Markham – Frau Kummer
- Peter Schratt – German officer

== Production ==
The producer formed a package and approached Tony Williams of Rank who agreed to finance. Williams had recently agreed to finance a remake of The 39 Steps; he defended the idea of remaking a classic:

The old films suffer technically against today's. The pace of modern films is much faster. The style of acting is different. Those old actors were marvellous, but if you consult the man in the street, he's more interested in seeing a current artist than someone who's been dead for years.

"What we're competing with here is not the real picture but people's memory of it", said George Axelrod. "Hitchcock's film had some brilliant things in it, but as a whole picture you'd have to admit it's pretty creaky. The four or five things people remember from the original receive a homage in our version – which raises the question of when a homage becomes a rip off."

Axelrod admitted the script was "not like the stuff I normally do, which is two people in and around a bed" but he agreed to do the adaptation because "this picture is actually going to be shown in theatres for actual people to see". Axelrod's involvement resulted from ABC TV wanting him to write a version of Murder on the Orient Express (1974) – he suggested they buy the rights to Night Train or The Lady Vanishes. He ended up writing three different versions of The Lady Vanishes for ABC, but none was picked up. The rights then reverted to Rank Films, who asked Axelrod to work on the film.

Among Axelrod's changes to the original were setting the new film in 1939 Germany, and altering the hero to a photographer from Life and the heroine to be a screwball "rompy, Carole Lombard character." The script was constantly rewritten as filming went along.

George Segal and Ali MacGraw were originally announced for the leads.

== Release ==
The film had a Royal world premiere at the Odeon Leicester Square in London on 8 May 1979 attended by Queen Elizabeth. It started public performances the following day.

== Reception ==
The consensus of critics is that the film suffers by comparison to Hitchcock's 1938 film. On Rotten Tomatoes, it has an approval rating of 33% based on six reviews, with an average rating of 3.2/10. Metacritic, which uses a weighted average, assigned the film a score of 42 out of 100, based on five critics, indicating "mixed or average" reviews.

Geoff Andrew of Time Out notes that "Comparisons are odious, but this remake of Hitchcock's thriller continually begs them by trampling heavily over its predecessor". The Encyclopedia of British Film, in the entry about director Anthony Page, says it is "about as witless and charmless as could be conceived".

Variety magazine notes that the script is "best when dwelling on English eccentricity to make the film's most endearing impression...Shepherd and Gould stack up as contrived cliches, characters that jar rather than complement." Film4's review agrees, writing that the two leads are "ruthlessly upstaged by loveable old coves Arthur Lowe and Ian Carmichael as cricket-mad Charters and Caldicott". It calls it a "watchable remake".

Filmink argued the movie "received horrendous reviews but actually isn’t that bad – quite stylish and fun. It probably needed a better reason to exist, like updating it to the present day (the story would have worked in Eastern Europe). The changes from the original story were mostly pointless (the original’s script is one of the most perfect of all time) and director Anthony Page, needless to say, is no Hitchcock."

== See also ==
- Remakes of films by Alfred Hitchcock
