= The Wheel Spins =

1936 novel by Ethel Lina White

- The Wheel Spins, 1st edition, Collins Crime Club, London, 1936.
- Author: Ethel Lina White
- Language: English
- Genre: Mystery
- Publisher: Collins Crime Club
- Publication date: 1936
- Publication place: United Kingdom

The Wheel Spins (a.k.a. The Lady Vanishes) is a 1936 mystery novel by British writer Ethel Lina White. It was notably adapted into the 1938 Alfred Hitchcock film The Lady Vanishes.

== Plot ==
Iris Carr, a young English society woman, is staying at a small hotel in ‘a remote corner of Europe’. Her friends leave on the train to Trieste. Iris is glad to be alone, but then starts to miss them. The remaining guests are also glad to see them leave, due to their noisy ways and monopolising of the hotel facilities. After going for a long walk and getting lost in the local mountains, Iris decides to leave also, but waiting at the railway station, she is struck or hit on the back of the head and loses consciousness. She wakes up in the waiting room, but as she can’t speak the local language, no-one can tell her what happened. She concludes that it must have been sunstroke, but manages to get on the crowded train. She finds herself in a compartment with only one English speaker, Miss Winifred Froy.

Miss Froy explains that she was a teacher of the children of a local aristocrat. His widow, the Baroness, is also a passenger in the compartment. Iris's fellow hotel guests the Reverend Mr and Mrs Barnes and the Misses Flood-Porter are also aboard the train. She spies a heavily bandaged body in another compartment, supervised by a sinister-looking doctor apparently taking an accident victim to hospital in Trieste.

Miss Froy confides that she has most recently been teacher to the children of the ‘Leader of the Opposition’, understood to be part of a nascent Communist faction. Iris and Miss Froy lunch in the restaurant car and on returning, Iris takes tablets for her headache. When she awakens, Miss Froy is not there.

All her fellow passengers deny having seen Miss Froy. Iris eventually finds two Englishmen who speak the local language: Max Hare, a young engineer and his travelling companion, 'the Professor'. All the passengers still deny Miss Froy’s existence. A lady dressed identically to Miss Froy reappears, but it isn’t her – it’s Frau Kummer. The Flood-Porters and the Barnes have their own reasons for wanting to get back to England without delay and continue to deny Miss Froy’s existence. The 'Todhunters', ostensibly honeymooners but actually an adulterous couple, remain in their private compartment and play no part in the events. Iris begins to believe that she has been hallucinating.

The doctor convinces Max to surreptitiously administer a sleeping-draught to Iris; as it takes effect, she summons the strength to enter the next compartment and rip off the bandages from the 'victim'. It is indeed Miss Froy.

Iris spends the rest of the journey through Italy and France in semi-consciousness. Only at Victoria station in London does Max explain what happened. Miss Froy innocently witnessed something without realising its significance. The doctor and his assistants have been arrested, but he feels that the Baroness will use her influence to hush up the matter.

Miss Froy returns home, having enjoyed her adventure, and Iris decides that she and Max will make his next trip ‘together’.

== Publishing ==
The novel was originally published in 1936 and is one of the few novels by White which are still in print today. It is available to read on Project Gutenberg Australia.

== Adaptations ==
=== Film ===
The novel has been adapted for the screen several times:

- The Lady Vanishes (1938), directed by Alfred Hitchcock and starring Margaret Lockwood, Michael Redgrave and Dame May Whitty.
- The Lady Vanishes (1979), starring Cybill Shepherd, Elliott Gould and Angela Lansbury.
- The Lady Vanishes (2013), television production starring Tuppence Middleton.

=== Radio ===
There have been various full cast adaptations:

- 1941, starring Errol Flynn and Dame Flora Robson. Part of the Philip Morris Playhouse series.

For BBC Radio:

- 1943, adapted and produced by Peter Watts. Part of the Saturday Night Theatre series.
- 1945, adapted and produced by Peter Watts.
- 1949, adapted by Peter Watts and produced by Raymond Raikes. Part of the Saturday Night Theatre series.
- 1953, adapted by Peter Watts and produced by Cleland Finn. Part of the Saturday Night Theatre series.
- 1999, adapted by Neville Teller and directed by Andy Jordan. Part of the Play of the Week series.

There are also two BBC serialised solo readings:

- 1956, in 10 episodes, abridged by Neville Teller and read by Marjorie Westbury.
- 2006, in 10 episodes, abridged by Neville Teller, produced by Neil Gardner and read by Brenda Blethyn.

Audiobooks

There are several unabridged audiobooks: the first, also from the BBC, read by Finty Williams, was released on six CDs by BBC Audiobooks in 2007. Two others from Audible are in English, read by Kim Hartman (2016) and German, read by Jens Wawrczeck (2019).

=== Theatre ===
- The Lady Vanishes (2019) written by Derek Webb
- The Lady Vanishes (2019) written by Antony Lampard
